= List of LGBTQ ambassadors of the United States =

This list of LGBT ambassadors of the United States includes ambassadors of the United States who publicly identified as lesbian, gay, bisexual, transgender or otherwise part of the LGBT community at the time of their appointment. This list includes ambassadors assigned to individual nations of the world, to international organizations (also known as permanent representatives), and ambassadors-at-large.

Ambassadors are nominated by the president of the United States and confirmed by the Senate. Ambassadors serve "at the pleasure of the president", meaning they can be dismissed at any time.

== List ==
Name	Accreditation	Credentials presented	Mission end	President(s)	Ref
James Hormel	Luxembourg	September 8, 1999	January 1, 2001	Bill Clinton	
Michael Guest	Romania	September 24, 2001	July 8, 2004	George W. Bush	
Mark Dybul	President's Emergency Plan for AIDS Relief	August 11, 2006	January 20, 2009	George W. Bush	
David Huebner	New Zealand	December 4, 2009	January 17, 2014	Barack Obama	
David Huebner	Samoa	February 23, 2010	January 17, 2014	Barack Obama	
Dan Baer	Organization for Security and Co-operation in Europe	September 10, 2013	January 20, 2017	Barack Obama	
David Pressman	United Nations Security Council	September 14, 2014	January 20, 2017	Barack Obama	
James Costos	Spain	September 24, 2013	January 18, 2017	Barack Obama	
James Costos	Andorra	April 4, 2014	January 18, 2017	Barack Obama	
Rufus Gifford	Denmark	September 13, 2013	January 20, 2017	Barack Obama	
Wally Brewster	Dominican Republic	December 9, 2013	January 20, 2017	Barack Obama	
John Berry	Australia	September 25, 2013	September 20, 2016	Barack Obama	
Howard Dean Pittman	Mozambique	November 23, 2014	November 4, 2019	Barack Obama	
Ted Osius	Vietnam	December 16, 2014	November 4, 2017	Barack Obama	
Ted Osius	Vietnam	December 16, 2014	November 4, 2017	Donald Trump	
Ric Grenell	Germany	May 8, 2018	June 1, 2020	Donald Trump	
Randy Berry	Nepal	October 25, 2018	October 2, 2022	Donald Trump	
Randy Berry	Nepal	October 25, 2018	October 2, 2022	Joe Biden	
Eric Nelson	Bosnia and Herzegovina	February 19, 2019	February 1, 2022	Donald Trump	
Eric Nelson	Bosnia and Herzegovina	February 19, 2019	February 1, 2022	Joe Biden	
Jeff Daigle	Cape Verde	September 10, 2019	July 3, 2024	Donald Trump	
Jeff Daigle	Cape Verde	September 10, 2019	July 3, 2024	Joe Biden	
Robert Gilchrist	Lithuania	February 4, 2020	August 12, 2023	Donald Trump	
Robert Gilchrist	Lithuania	February 4, 2020	August 12, 2023	Joe Biden	
Scott Miller	Switzerland	January 11, 2022	January 20, 2025	Joe Biden	
Scott Miller	Liechtenstein	February 16, 2022	January 20, 2025	Joe Biden	
Erik Ramanathan	Sweden	January 20, 2022	January 20, 2025	Joe Biden	
Christopher Lamora	Cameroon	March 21, 2022	January 17, 2026	Joe Biden	
David Pressman	Hungary	September 14, 2022	January 13, 2025	Joe Biden	

== See also ==
- List of the first LGBT holders of political offices in the United States
