= Ross L. Wilson =

American diplomat (born 1955)

Ross Wilson
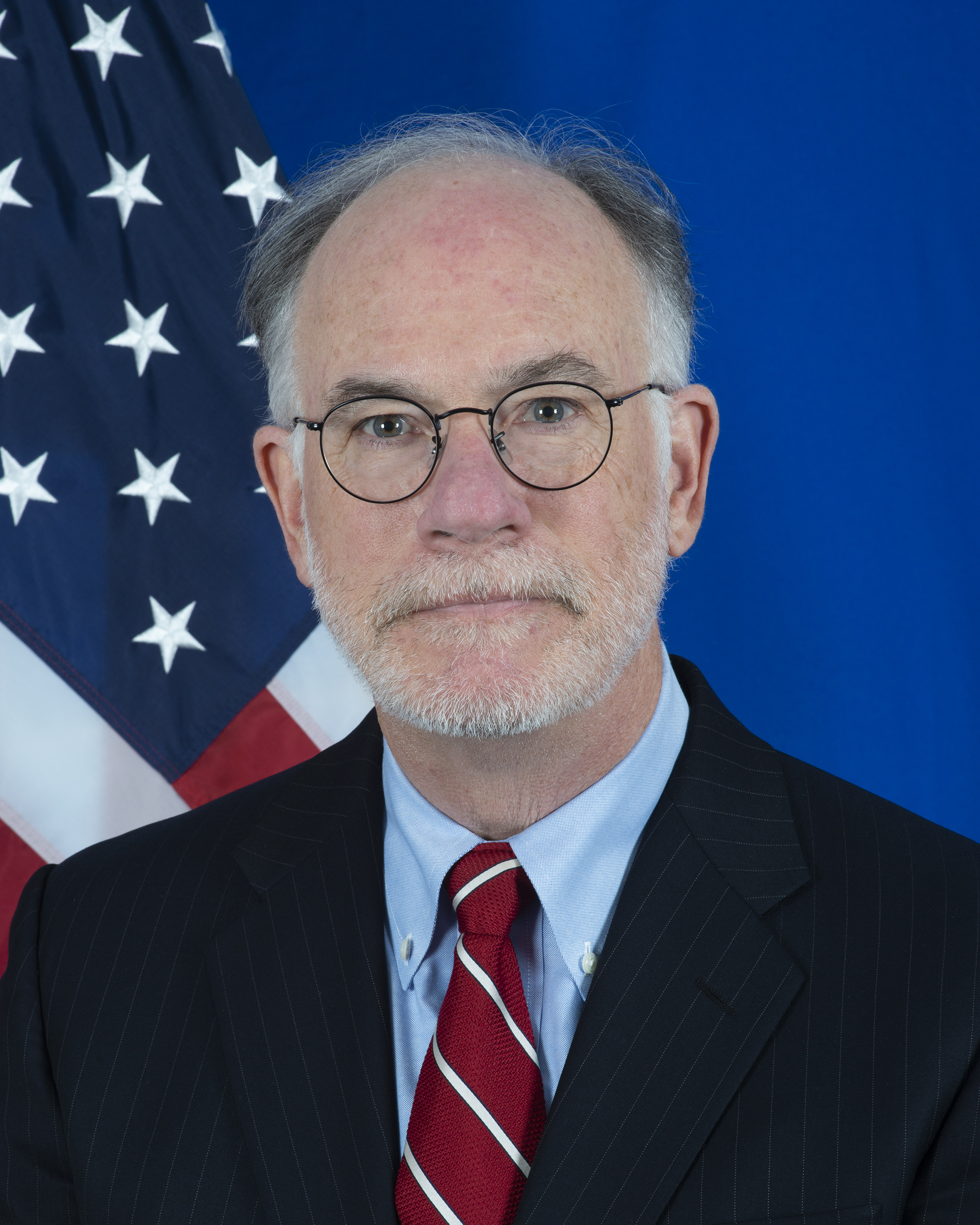
- Official portrait, 2020

Chargé d'Affaires of the United States to Afghanistan
- In office January 18, 2020 – August 31, 2021
- President: Donald Trump; Joe Biden
- Preceded by: John R. Bass (ambassador)
- Succeeded by: Ian McCary

United States Ambassador to Turkey
- In office December 8, 2005 – August 9, 2008
- President: George W. Bush
- Preceded by: Eric S. Edelman
- Succeeded by: James Franklin Jeffrey

United States Ambassador to Azerbaijan
- In office October 11, 2000 – April 24, 2003
- President: Bill Clinton; George W. Bush
- Preceded by: Stanley Tuemler Escudero
- Succeeded by: Reno L. Harnish

Personal details
- Born: August 22, 1955 (age 71) Minneapolis, Minnesota, U.S.
- Spouse: Margo Squire
- Children: 2
- Education: University of Minnesota (BA); Columbia University (MIA); National War College (MA)

Ross L. Wilson (born August 22, 1955) is an American diplomat who was the chargé d'affaires of the United States to Afghanistan from 2020 to 2021. He was the U.S. ambassador to Turkey from 2005 to 2008 and the U.S. ambassador to Azerbaijan from 2000 to 2003, with the personal rank of minister-counselor. He also teaches part-time at Carleton College. Wilson also previously served as director of the Dinu Patriciu Eurasia Center at the Atlantic Council.

== Early life and education ==
Wilson was born in Minneapolis, Minnesota, on August 22, 1955. He received a bachelor's degree magna cum laude from the University of Minnesota in 1977 and master's degrees from Columbia University in 1979 and the National War College in 1995. Early in his career, he served in the State Department’s Offices of Soviet Union and Egyptian Affairs.

== Career ==
Wilson served as consul general at the American embassy in Moscow from 1980 to 1982, at the American embassy in Prague from 1985 to 1987, and again in Moscow from 1987 to 1990. He was special assistant to the under secretary of state for economic affairs and counselor of the Department from 1990 to 1992. From 1992 to 1994, Wilson worked as deputy executive secretary of state for Secretaries of State James Baker, Larence Eagleburger, and Warren Christopher. He served as U.S. consul general again in Melbourne, Australia, from 1995 to 1997.

From 1997 to 2000, Wilson was principal deputy to the ambassador-at-large and special advisor to the secretary of state for the newly independent states of the former Soviet Union.

In February 2000, President Clinton nominated Wilson to be ambassador to the Republic of Azerbaijan, and he served in that capacity from 2000 to 2003. From June 2003 to February 2005, he served as U.S. senior negotiator for the Free Trade Area of the Americas (FTAA) at the Office of the U.S. Trade Representative. In this capacity, he headed the U.S. delegation in the FTAA negotiations and was responsible for the development, coordination and implementation of U.S. government negotiating positions and strategies in these trade talks. Between February and August 2005, Wilson served as executive assistant and chief of staff for deputy secretary of state Robert B. Zoellick, providing policy and staff support to the deputy secretary on the entire range of issues in U.S. foreign policy.

Wilson was nominated to serve at the Ankara embassy by President George W. Bush on October 28, 2005. He was confirmed by the United States Senate on November 18 and sworn in by Secretary of State Condoleezza Rice on December 2. He arrived in Turkey on December 3 and presented his credentials to President Ahmet Necdet Sezer on December 8, 2005.

On July 9, 2008, a guard post outside the U.S. Consulate in Istanbul was attacked by three gunmen. They killed three Turkish police officers, and wounded several others, before being killed by Turkish police. In response to the attack, Wilson said:

I want to express my condolences to the families of three Turkish police personnel who were killed in the attack that took place earlier today on our Consulate General in Istanbul. I understand there may be an additional two Turkish police who are wounded, and they are in our thoughts and prayers. [...]

The Turkish police responded quickly and effectively. We are deeply grateful for the work that they do to protect our official U.S. Government establishments here. We are cooperating closely with them, of course. [...]

It is an obvious act of terrorism. Our countries will stand together and confront this, as we have in the past.

Wilson is the recipient of the President’s Meritorious Service Award (2005), Azerbaijan’s Order of Honor, and numerous State Department awards.

In January 2020, Wilson was asked to serve as chargé d'affaires to Afghanistan, pending a permanent ambassador. On August 15, 2021, in the face of the Taliban advance on Kabul, Wilson and the U.S. Embassy in Kabul relocated to Hamid Karzai International Airport. On August 30, Wilson departed Kabul aboard the last evacuation flight as the final members of the U.S. military left Afghanistan. On August 31, the embassy transferred operations to Doha, Qatar, from where staff began providing limited consular services concentrated on the evacuation effort, including processing visas for people leaving Afghanistan. Deputy chief of mission Ian McCary took over as chargé d'affaires when the embassy relocated to Doha, and Wilson returned to the U.S.

== Personal life ==
Wilson is married to Margo Squire, who is also a career diplomat with the State Department. They have two sons. His mother, Winnidell Gravitt Wilson, was born and raised in Oklahoma, where her Choctaw ancestors settled after surviving the "Trail of Tears" Indian removal. She was a direct descendant of Choctaw chief Nita-oshe.

Diplomatic posts
Preceded by Eric S. Edelman	United States Ambassador to Turkey; 2005–2008	Succeeded by James Franklin Jeffrey
Preceded by Stanley T. Escudero	United States Ambassador to Azerbaijan; 2000–2003	Succeeded by Reno L. Harnish
Preceded by John R. Bass (ambassador)	Chargé d'Affaires of the United States to Afghanistan; 2020–2021	Succeeded by Ian McCary
