= Eric S. Edelman =

American diplomat

Eric Edelman
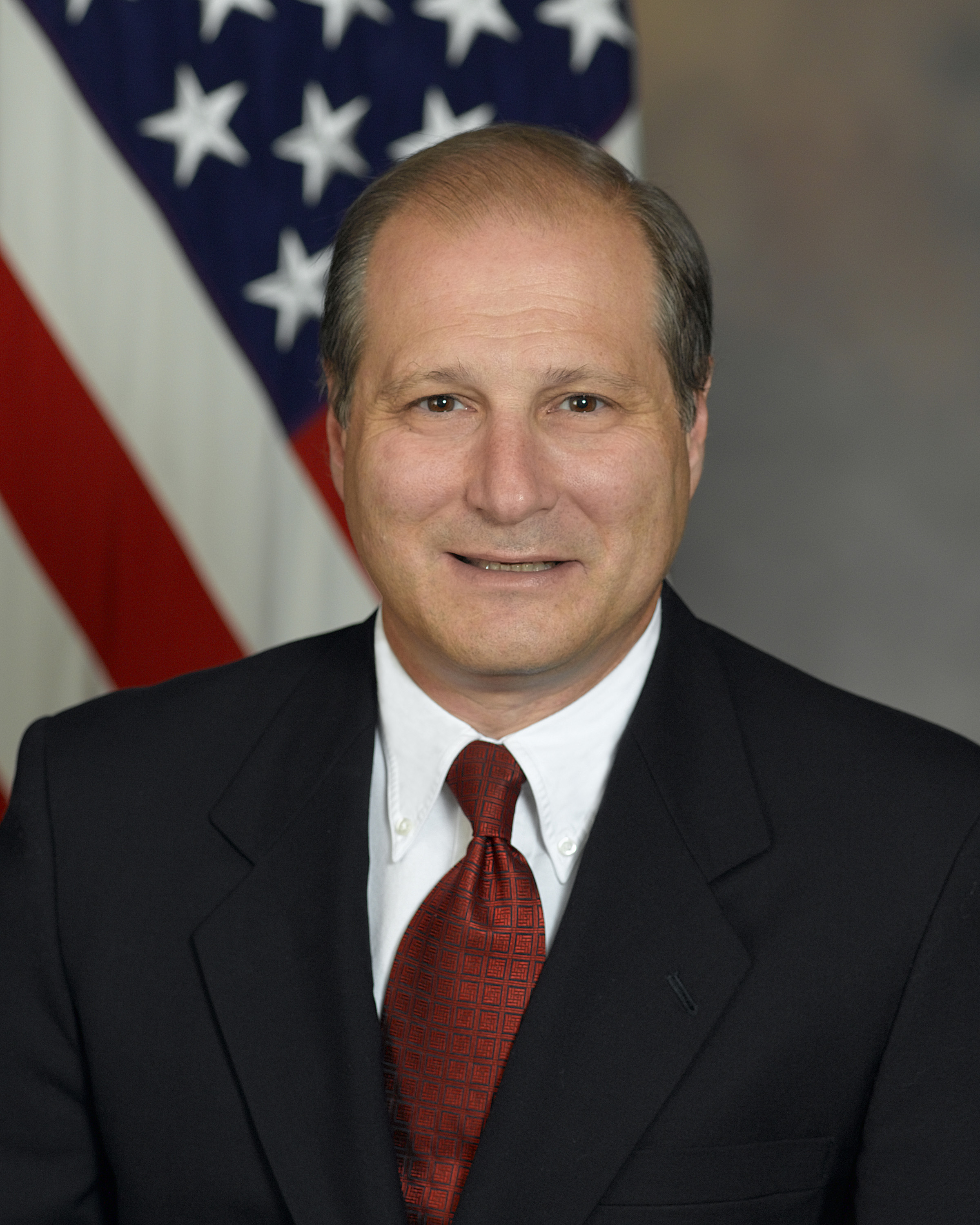

8th Under Secretary of Defense for Policy
- In office August 9, 2005 – January 20, 2009
- President: George W. Bush
- Preceded by: Douglas Feith
- Succeeded by: Michele Flournoy

United States Ambassador to Turkey
- In office August 29, 2003 – June 19, 2005
- Appointed by: George W. Bush
- Preceded by: W. Robert Pearson
- Succeeded by: Ross Wilson

United States Ambassador to Finland
- In office August 27, 1998 – January 29, 2001
- Appointed by: Bill Clinton
- Preceded by: Derek Shearer
- Succeeded by: Bonnie McElveen-Hunter

Personal details
- Born: Eric Steven Edelman; October 27, 1951 (age 74) Baltimore, Maryland, U.S.
- Party: Republican
- Spouse: Patricia Edelman
- Education: Cornell University (BA); Yale University (MA, MPhil, PhD)
- Awards: Department of Defense Medal for Distinguished Public Service; Legion of Honour
- Website: Defense Department biography at the Wayback Machine (archived March 6, 2008)

Eric Steven Edelman (born October 27, 1951) is an American diplomat who served as Under Secretary of Defense for Policy (2005–2009), U.S. Ambassador to Turkey (2003–2005), U.S. Ambassador to the Republic of Finland (1998–2001), and Principal Deputy Assistant to the Vice President for National Security Affairs (2001–2003). A career Foreign Service Officer, Edelman entered the Senior Foreign Service in 1992. He is a recipient of the Secretary of Defense's award for Distinguished Civilian Service (1993) and the State Department's Superior Honor Award (1990 and 1996).

He retired from the U.S. Foreign Service in May 2009 and is a visiting scholar at the Philip Merrill Center for Strategic Studies and Roger Hertog Distinguished Practitioner in Residence at the Paul H. Nitze School of Advanced International Studies (SAIS), and Distinguished Fellow at the Center for Strategic and Budgetary Assessments. He was also an advisor for the 2012 Mitt Romney presidential campaign.

Edelman currently serves as co-chair for the Bipartisan Policy Center's Turkey Initiative and as co-chair of the congressionally mandated Commission on National Defense Strategy. With Eliot Cohen, he is the cohost of the Shield of the Republic podcast, published by The Bulwark. Edelman was a member of the Defense Policy Board Advisory Committee, until Secretary of Defense Pete Hegseth disbanded all Defense Department (DOD) advisory boards in April 2025.

== Education ==
Edelman received a B.A. in history and government from Cornell University in 1972. He then attended Yale University, earning an M.A. in 1973, an M.Phil. in 1975 and a Ph.D. in U.S. diplomatic history in 1981.

== Career ==
Edelman's diplomatic career began in early January 1980 when he was a member of the U.S. Middle East Delegation to the West Bank/Gaza Autonomy Talks Delegations from 1980 to 1981. He was later a Watch Officer in the State Department Operations Center (1981–1982) and a Staff Officer on the Secretariat Staff (1982). From 1982 to 1984, he acted as Special Assistant to Secretary of State George P. Shultz. Then, from 1984 to 1986, he served as Director of Soviet Policies at the Office of Soviet Affairs at the Department of State. From 1987 to 1989, he was Head of the External Political Section at the U.S. Embassy in Moscow. This was followed by appointment as Special Assistant to the Undersecretary of State for Political Affairs (April 1989–April 1990). Edelman voted for George Bush in the 1988 U.S. presidential election.

In April 1990, Edelman became the Assistant Deputy Under Secretary of Defense for Soviet and East European Affairs. He held this position until April 1993, at which point he became Deputy to the Ambassador-at-Large and Special Advisor to the Secretary of State on the New Independent States from April 1993 to July 1993. He moved to the Czech Republic in June 1994, where he took on the role of Deputy Chief of Mission at the U.S. Embassy in Prague. He held this position until June 1996, at which time he became Executive Assistant to the Deputy Secretary of State from June 1996 to July 1998.

Edelman's first ambassadorial appointment came in 1998 when he was made the U.S. ambassador to Finland. This three-year position (1998–2001) was followed by his appointment as Principal Deputy Assistant to the Vice President for National Security Affairs (February 2001 – July 2003)—in which he became a member of Dick Cheney's staff working under Scooter Libby.

Edelman's second term as ambassador was from July 2003 to June 2005 as Ambassador to the Republic of Turkey. Edelman took on this role after the second Iraq invasion, during which anti-American tensions within Turkey were high. He was next appointed to the position of Undersecretary of Defense for Policy on August 9, 2005, via recess appointment by George W. Bush, after his nomination was stalled in the Senate. Edelman replaced Douglas Feith, who had resigned. The appointment since his confirmation by the senate would have been impossible to achieve, set to expire in January 2007 when a new Congress convened, was confirmed by the Senate on February 9, 2006.

=== Criticism of U.S. Senator Hillary Clinton ===
In July 2007, Edelman attracted media attention for criticizing Senator Hillary Clinton, a member of the Senate Armed Services Committee. In a private letter to Senator Clinton in response to a request made to the Pentagon in May 2007 for an outline plans for withdrawing troops from combat in Iraq, Edelman rebuffed her request and wrote:

Premature and public discussion of the withdrawal of U.S. forces from Iraq reinforces enemy propaganda that the United States will abandon its allies in Iraq, much as we are perceived to have done in Vietnam, Lebanon and Somalia.

The Associated Press described his criticisms as "stinging". According to the Associated Press, Edelman's comments were: "unusual, particularly because it was directed at a member of the Senate Armed Services Committee". The Associated Press pointed out that fellow committee member Republican Senator Richard Lugar had also called for discussions of withdrawing U.S. troops from Iraq, but had escaped Edelman's criticism. Clinton has said she is "shocked by the timeworn tactic of once again impugning the patriotism of any of us who raise serious questions" about the Iraq war. In a letter to Secretary of Defense Gates, Senator Clinton reiterated her request for plans on troop redeployment and protested Edelman's criticism and asked if Edelman's letter accurately reflected Gates' views as Secretary of Defense. In reference to Clinton's comments, Secretary of Defense Gates has said "I believe that congressional debate on Iraq has been constructive and appropriate."

=== Turkey ===
On February 13, 2018, Edelman published an article, along with Jake Sullivan, in Politico: "Turkey Is Out of Control. Time for the U.S. to Say So." According to Edelman and Sullivan, a "clear and tough-minded approach to Turkey is the only way to prevent that clash." In January 2018, Turkey launched Operation Olive Branch in northern Syria. Recep Tayyip Erdogan, President of Turkey since 2014, has confronted US forces with an 'Ottoman slap'.

=== 2020 U.S. Presidential Election ===
In 2020, Edelman, along with over 130 other former Republican national security officials, signed a statement that asserted that President Trump was unfit to serve another term, and "To that end, we are firmly convinced that it is in the best interest of our nation that Vice President Joe Biden be elected as the next President of the United States, and we will vote for him."

Edelman continued to speak out about Trump's actions during his 2nd term.

Diplomatic posts
Preceded by Derek Shearer	United States Ambassador to Finland; 1998–2001	Succeeded by Bonnie McElveen-Hunter
Preceded by W. Robert Pearson	United States Ambassador to Turkey; 2003–2005	Succeeded by Ross Wilson
Government offices
Preceded by Douglas Feith	Under Secretary of Defense for Policy; 2005–2009	Succeeded by Michele Flournoy
