= John R. Bass =

American diplomat (born 1964)

John Bass
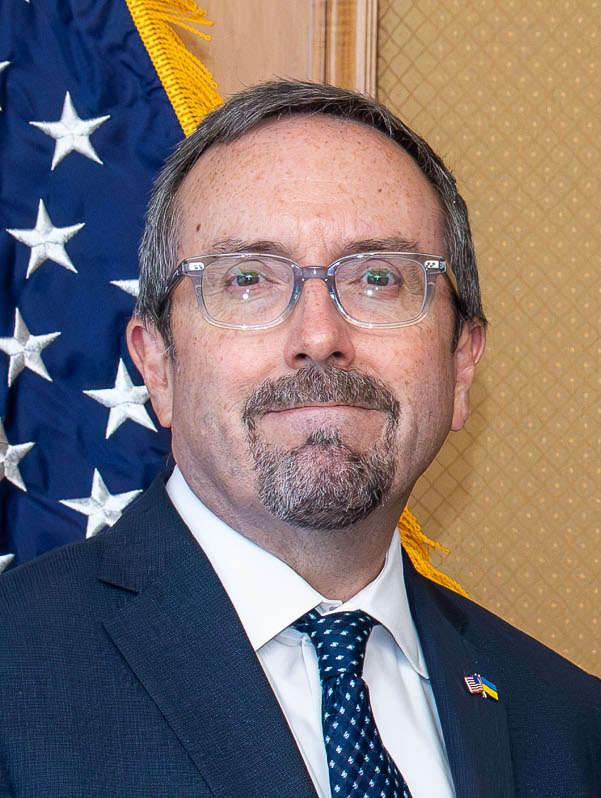
- Bass in 2024

Acting United States Secretary of State
- In office January 20, 2025 (Note: Bass served as Acting United States Secretary of State, in his capacity as Under Secretary of State for Management and Acting Under Secretary of State for Political Affairs, for a few hours on January 20, 2025, pursuant to Department of State Delegation of Authority No. 513-1 titled “Delegation of the Authorities of the Secretary to Under Secretary John R. Bass” that was signed by Antony Blinken on December 21, 2022 and published in the Federal Register on January 6, 2023 and Department of State Delegation of Authority No. 553 titled “Delegation of Authority-Authorities of the Secretary” that was signed by Antony Blinken on March 29, 2024 and published in the Federal Register on April 10, 2024, from the time that Antony Blinken had formally resigned as United States Secretary of State at noon on January 20, 2025 until the time of the formal appointment of Principal Deputy Assistant Secretary of State for Intelligence and Research and Acting Assistant Secretary of State for Intelligence and Research Lisa D. Kenna as Acting United States Secretary of State, Acting Under Secretary of State for Political Affairs and Executive Secretary of the United States Department of State a few hours later in the afternoon on January 20, 2025.)
- President: Donald Trump
- Preceded by: Antony Blinken
- Succeeded by: Lisa D. Kenna (acting)

Acting Under Secretary of State for Political Affairs
- In office March 22, 2024 – January 20, 2025
- President: Joe Biden
- Preceded by: Victoria Nuland
- Succeeded by: Lisa D. Kenna (acting)

16th Under Secretary of State for Management
- In office December 29, 2021 – January 20, 2025
- President: Joe Biden
- Preceded by: Brian Bulatao
- Succeeded by: Jason S. Evans

22nd United States Ambassador to Afghanistan
- In office December 12, 2017 – January 6, 2020
- President: Donald Trump
- Preceded by: P. Michael McKinley
- Succeeded by: Ross Wilson (chargé d'affaires)

United States Ambassador to Turkey
- In office October 20, 2014 – October 15, 2017
- President: Barack Obama; Donald Trump
- Deputy: Philip Kosnett
- Preceded by: Francis J. Ricciardone Jr.
- Succeeded by: David M. Satterfield

24th Executive Secretary of the United States Department of State
- In office October 8, 2012 – July 18, 2014
- President: Barack Obama
- Preceded by: Stephen Mull
- Succeeded by: Joseph Macmanus

United States Ambassador to Georgia
- In office October 16, 2009 – July 17, 2012
- President: Barack Obama
- Preceded by: John F. Tefft
- Succeeded by: Richard Norland

Personal details
- Born: 1964 (age 61–62) New York, U.S.
- Spouse: Holly Holzer
- Education: Syracuse University (BA)

John Rodney Bass II (born 1964) is an American diplomat, who served as the under secretary of state for management from 2021 to 2025 and the acting under secretary of state for political affairs. Bass also served as the United States ambassador to Afghanistan from 2017 to 2020, the United States ambassador to Turkey from 2014 to 2017 and the United States ambassador to Georgia from 2009 to 2012. Bass also served as Acting United States Secretary of State, in his capacity as Under Secretary of State for Management and Acting Under Secretary of State for Political Affairs, for a few hours on January 20, 2025, pursuant to Department of State Delegation of Authority No. 513-1 titled “Delegation of the Authorities of the Secretary to Under Secretary John R. Bass” that was signed by Antony Blinken on December 21, 2022 and published in the Federal Register on January 6, 2023 and Department of State Delegation of Authority No. 553 titled “Delegation of Authority-Authorities of the Secretary” that was signed by Antony Blinken on March 29, 2024 and published in the Federal Register on April 10, 2024, from the time that Antony Blinken had formally resigned as United States Secretary of State at noon on January 20, 2025 until the time of the formal appointment of Principal Deputy Assistant Secretary of State for Intelligence and Research and Acting Assistant Secretary of State for Intelligence and Research Lisa D. Kenna as Acting United States Secretary of State a few hours later in the afternoon on January 20, 2025.

== Career ==
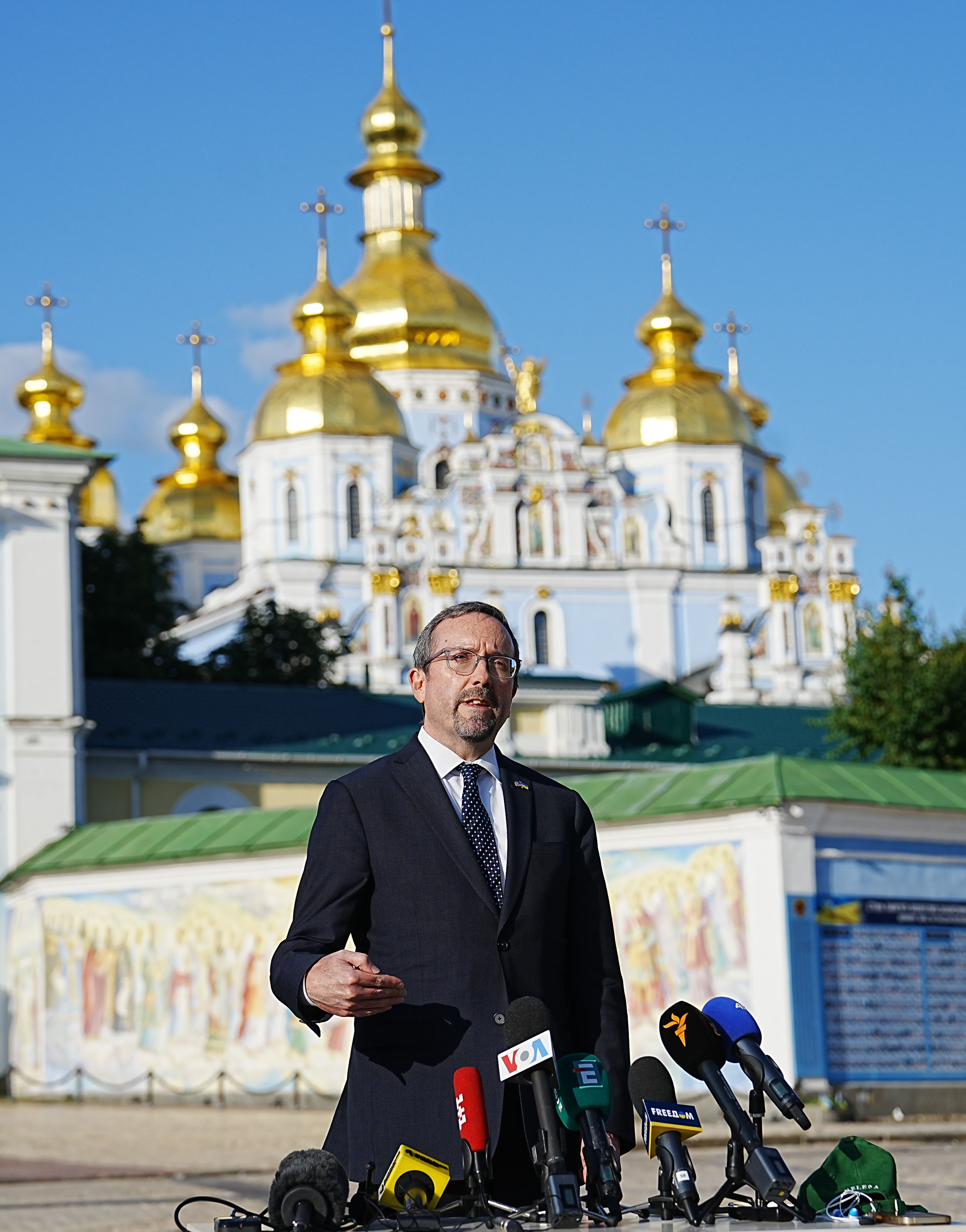
John Bass visited Kyiv, June 21, 2024

Bass is from upstate New York. He graduated from Syracuse University in 1986 and was a newspaper editor and political campaign consultant before joining the Foreign Service in 1988. Shortly after, he was posted to Belgium, the Netherlands, and Chad.

In 1998, he worked for deputy secretary of state Strobe Talbott, first as a special assistant for Europe and Eurasia including as part of the peace negotiations in the Kosovo War. He was later named as Talbott's chief of staff in 2000, coordinating policy on arms reduction with Russia.

In 2005, Bass was named director of the State Department Operations Center. He was sent to Iraq in 2008 as the leader of a provincial reconstruction team. He speaks Italian and French.

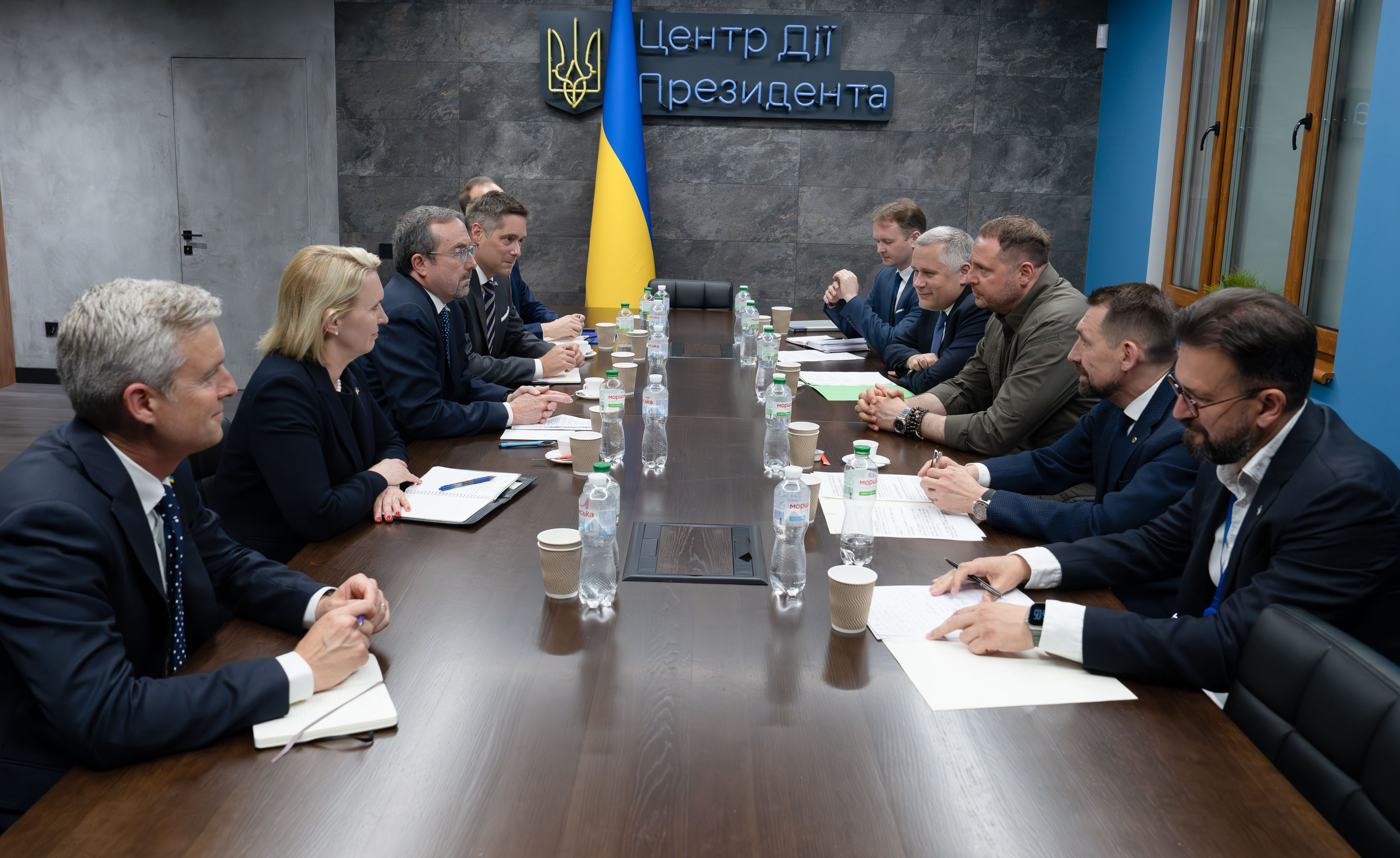
Acting Under Secretary of State for Political Affairs John Bass with Ambassador Brink meeting Ukrainian officials in Kyiv on June 21, 2024

In October 2012, he was appointed Executive Secretary of the United States Department of State and served as the liaison between the State Department's many bureaus and the leadership offices of the Secretary, the Deputy Secretaries, and the Director of Policy Planning.

In October 2017, after the U.S. decided to suspend non-immigrant visa services within Turkey, Turkish president Recep Tayyip Erdoğan said the Turkish government would no longer recognize Bass's authority as a U.S. ambassador. The cancellation of visitor visas came after a Turkish court ordered the arrest of an employee of the U.S. Consulate in Istanbul.

After the suspension of visa services in Turkey, Bass published a statement on YouTube.

President Donald Trump named him as his choice to become the United States ambassador to Afghanistan on July 20, 2017. On September 28, 2017, his nomination was confirmed by the Senate. Bass left the position on January 6, 2020.

On July 21, 2021, President Joe Biden nominated him to serve as Under Secretary of State for Management. On December 18, 2021, he was confirmed by the Senate.

Bass was appointed as acting Under Secretary of State for Political Affairs in March 2024, following the resignation of Victoria Nuland.

== See also ==
- Turkey–United States relations

== Notes ==
Diplomatic posts
| Preceded by John Tefft | United States Ambassador to Georgia; 2009–2012 | Succeeded by Richard Norland |
| Preceded by Francis Ricciardone | United States Ambassador to Turkey; 2014–2017 | Succeeded by Philip Kosnett; Chargé d'affaires a.i |
| Preceded by P. Michael McKinley | United States Ambassador to Afghanistan; 2017–2020 | Succeeded by Ross Wilson; Chargé d'affaires |
Political offices
| Preceded by Stephen Mull | Executive Secretary of the Department of State; 2012–2014 | Succeeded by Joseph Macmanus |
| Preceded by Brian Bulatao | Under Secretary of State for Management; 2021–2025 | Succeeded by Tibor P. Nagy; Acting |
| Preceded by Victoria Nuland | Under Secretary of State for Political Affairs; Acting; 2024–2025 | Succeeded by Lisa D. Kenna; Acting |
| Preceded by Antony Blinken | United States Secretary of State; Acting; 2025 | Succeeded by Lisa D. Kenna; Acting |
