= Robert S. Gilchrist =

American diplomat (born 1964)

Bob Gilchrist
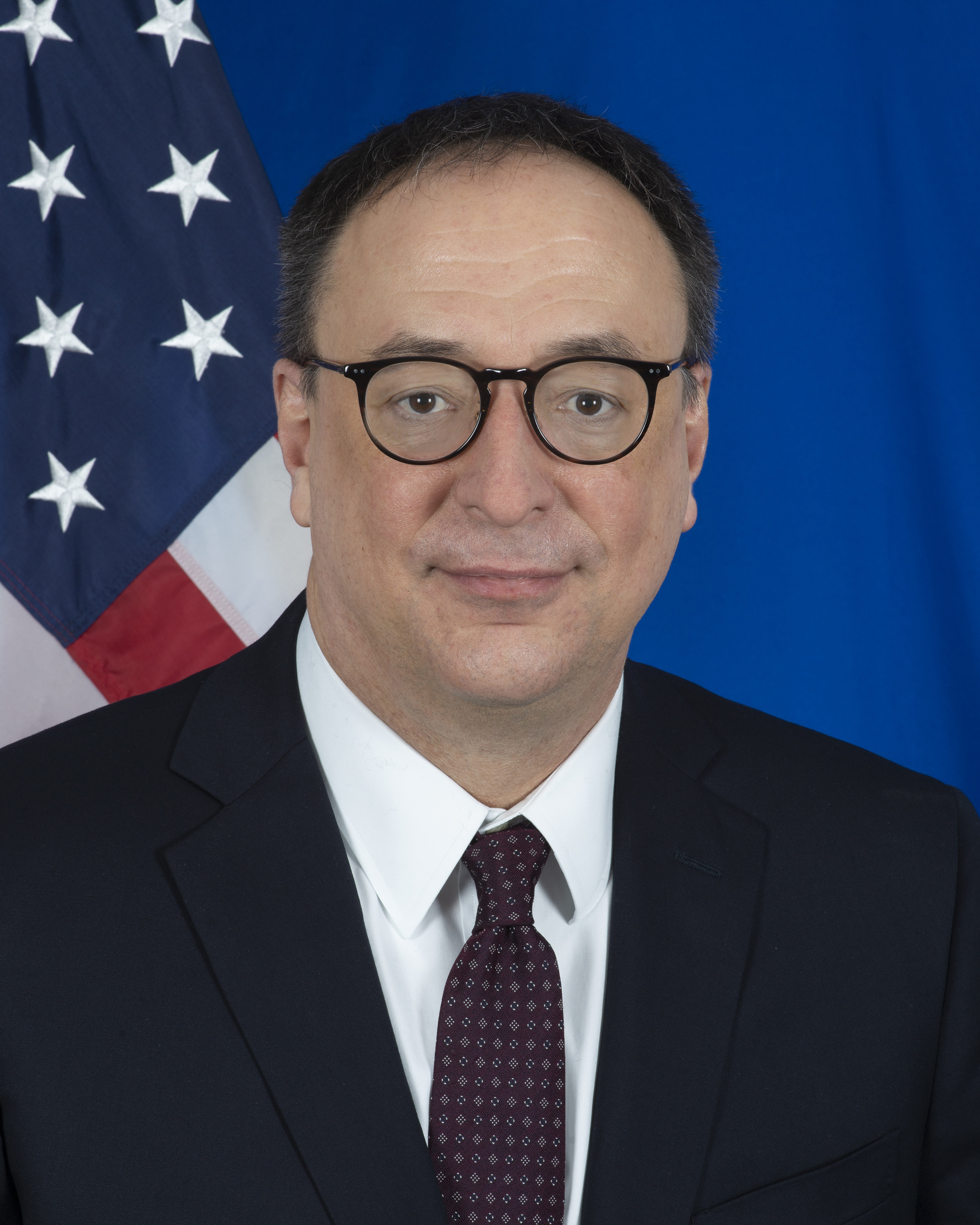

United States Ambassador to Lithuania
- In office February 4, 2020 – August 12, 2023
- President: Donald Trump; Joe Biden
- Preceded by: Anne Hall
- Succeeded by: Kara McDonald

Personal details
- Born: Robert Stuart Gilchrist; 1964 (age 61–62) Leesburg, Florida, U.S.
- Education: Wake Forest University (BA); University of Virginia (MA)

Robert Stuart Gilchrist (born 1964) is an American diplomat who had served as the principal deputy assistant secretary of state for democracy, human rights, and labor from September 2023 to August 2024. He served as the United States ambassador to Lithuania from February 2020 to August 2023. He is a career Foreign Service Officer with the rank of minister counselor. He was appointed by President Donald Trump and confirmed by the United States Senate on December 20, 2019. Gilchrist was the fifth US ambassador from the LGBT community nominated to serve by the Trump administration.

== Early life and education ==
Gilchrist earned a Bachelor of Arts from Wake Forest University and a Master of Arts from the University of Virginia.

== Career ==
Gilchrist was director of the United States Department of State Operations Center, deputy chief of mission of the United States embassy in Sweden, deputy chief of mission of the United States embassy in Estonia, and the director of Nordic and Baltic Affairs in the State Department's Bureau of European and Eurasian Affairs. Among his earlier assignments, he was deputy political counselor at the United States embassy in Iraq, chief of the political section of the United States embassy in Romania, and a special assistant in the Office of the deputy secretary of state.

=== United States ambassador to Lithuania ===
On July 22, 2019, President Donald Trump announced his intent to nominate Gilchrist to be the United States ambassador to Lithuania. His nomination was sent to the Senate on August 1, 2019. Russian hostility was a central topic during his confirmation hearings. On December 19, 2019, his nomination was confirmed in the Senate by voice vote. Gilchrist was the fifth LGBT ambassador confirmed under the Trump administration. He presented his credentials to Lithuanian President Gitanas Nausėda on February 4, 2020. He left office in August 12, 2023.

=== U.S. State Department ===
Gilchrist had served as the Principal Deputy Assistant Secretary of State for Democracy, Human Rights, and Labor.

== Personal life ==
Gilchrist speaks Spanish, French, Estonian, and Romanian.

== See also ==
- Ambassadors of the United States
- List of LGBT ambassadors of the United States
- GLIFAA (Gays and Lesbians in Foreign Affairs Agencies)

Diplomatic posts
Preceded by Anne Hall	United States Ambassador to Lithuania; 2020–2023	Succeeded by Tamir Waser; Chargé d'affaires
