= Darryl N. Johnson =

American diplomat (1938–2018)

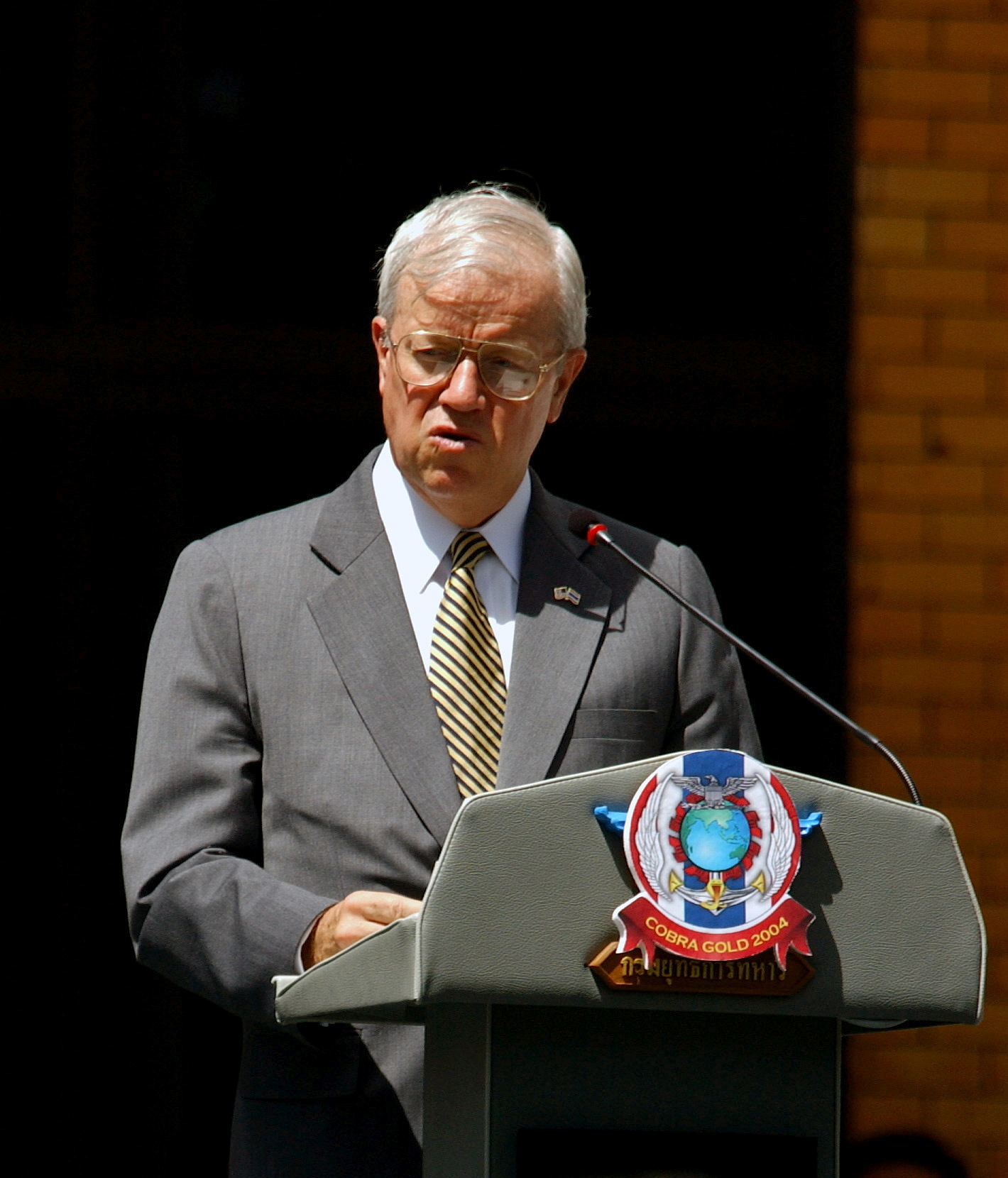
- Darryl N. Johnson in 2004

United States Ambassador to Thailand
- In office November 26, 2001 – December 28, 2004
- President: George W. Bush
- Preceded by: Richard E. Hecklinger
- Succeeded by: Ralph Leo Boyce

Director of American Institute in Taiwan
- In office 1996–1999
- President: Bill Clinton
- Preceded by: B. Lynn Pascoe
- Succeeded by: Raymond Burghardt

United States Ambassador to Lithuania
- In office March 23, 1992 – May 23, 1994
- President: Bill Clinton
- Preceded by: Owen J.C. Norem
- Succeeded by: James W. Swihart

Personal details
- Born: 1938 Chicago, Illinois, U.S.
- Died: June 24, 2018 (aged 79–80)
- Education: University of Washington (B.A.); University of Minnesota; Princeton University
- Occupation: Diplomat, Statesman

Darryl Norman Johnson (1938 – 24 June 2018) was an American politician and career Foreign Service Officer who held many positions in American government around the world. Most recently and importantly he was the United States Ambassador to Thailand from 2001 to 2005. Additionally, he was acting US Ambassador to the Philippines for several months in 2005. He used to live near Seattle, WA. In retirement he was a lecturer at his undergraduate alma mater, the University of Washington, where he taught in its Jackson School of International Studies.

== Early life ==
Johnson was born in Chicago, Illinois, but he grew up in suburban Seattle, Washington. He attended public schools in Seattle, graduating from high school in 1956. He then attended the University of Puget Sound for two years before transferring to the University of Washington, where he received his BA Cum Laude in English Literature in 1960.

While at the University of Washington he was a member of the academic honor societies for Military Science, Music and Literature, and was admitted to Phi Beta Kappa society in 1960. He next attended the University of Minnesota and Princeton University, working several months at the Boeing Company in Seattle during and after his university studies. He served as a Peace Corps volunteer in Thailand between 1962 and 1965, joining the Foreign Service after he returned home.

== Foreign service career ==
Johnson had a long and distinguished career as a United States Foreign Service officer, with extensive experience in East European and Asian affairs. Among other assignments, he served on the Bosnia Task Force in Washington and as Charge of the U.S. Embassy in Sarajevo in April 1996. Before that, he was Senior Advisor to Madeleine Albright, U.S. Ambassador to the United Nations, and before that, was Deputy Coordinator for Assistance to the New Independent States of the Former Soviet Union.

Johnson served as the first American Ambassador to the Republic of Lithuania, having arrived in Vilnius in September, 1991, to open the first post-World War II U.S. Mission in that country. Prior to that, he served as Deputy Chief of Mission at the U.S. Embassy in Warsaw, Poland (1988–1991), and before that in Beijing (1984–1987), Moscow (1974–1977), Hong Kong (1969–1973), and Bombay (1966–1967). In addition, he served in the Department of State in Washington, D.C., as Officer-in-Charge of Yugoslav Affairs (1977–1979), Officer-in-Charge of People's Republic of China Affairs (1979–1981), as a Pearson Fellow in the Office of Senator Claiborne Pell (D-RI) (1981–82), and as Special Assistant to the Under Secretary for Political Affairs (1982–84). In the latter position, his responsibilities included East European, Soviet, and East Asian/Pacific Affairs during the tenure of the then Under Secretary, Lawrence Eagleburger.

== Lecturing ==
In his capacity as lecturer at the University of Washington, Ambassador Johnson teaches a class called "Practicing American Foreign Policy", and also advises undergraduate students on their Qualifying Papers, an extended writing assignment of approximately 25 pages that is required by the Jackson School for graduation. This teaching position at the University of Washington has previously been held by former U.S. diplomats Ronald Woods and Charles T. Cross. Ambassador Johnson also participates at various speaking engagements in the Seattle area, many of which relate to the Peace Corps and to the United States Foreign Service. He has published op-eds in several major newspapers regarding politics in Thailand, including the Los Angeles Times and the Seattle Times.

== Personal life ==
Johnson is the father of one daughter and two sons. He is married to the former Kathleen Desa Forance. In addition to English he speaks Chinese (Mandarin), Polish, Russian, Thai and Lithuanian. Johnson died in Seattle on 24 June 2018.

Diplomatic posts
Preceded by post established	United States Ambassador to Lithuania; 1992–1994	Succeeded by James W. Swihart
Preceded by Richard E. Hecklinger	United States Ambassador to Thailand; 2001–2004	Succeeded by Ralph Leo Boyce
Preceded by Joseph A. Mussomeli	United States Ambassador to the Philippines; 2005–2006	Succeeded by Kristie Kenney
Preceded by B. Lynn Pascoe	Director of the American Institute in Taiwan; 1996–1999	Succeeded by Raymond Burghardt
