= Anne Hall =

American diplomat

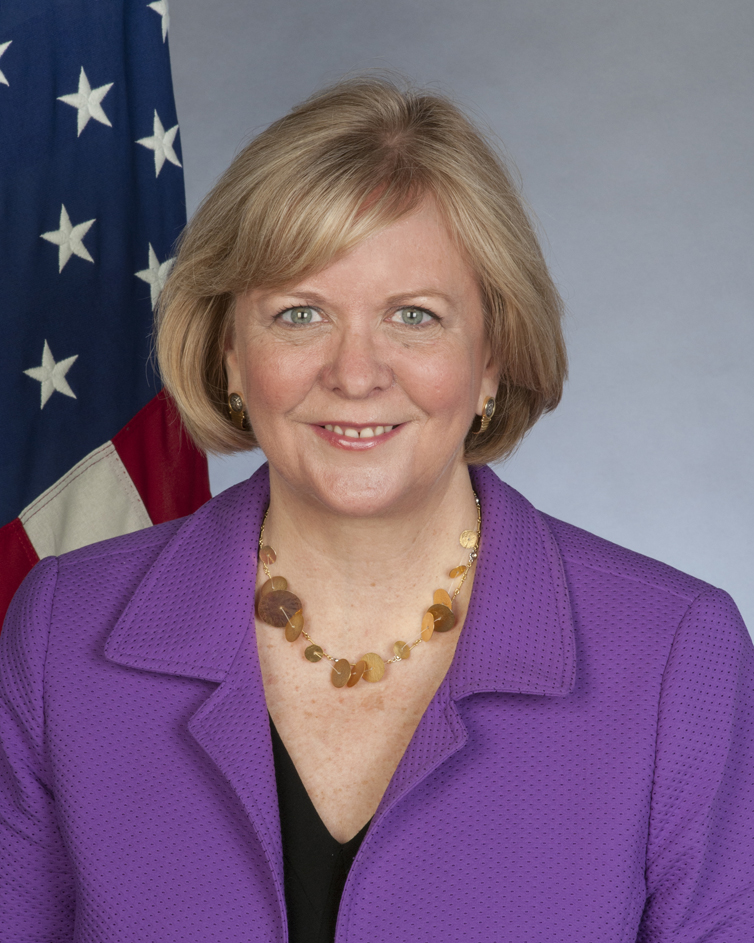

United States Ambassador to Lithuania
- In office September 16, 2016 – July 19, 2019
- President: Barack Obama; Donald Trump
- Preceded by: Deborah McCarthy
- Succeeded by: Robert S. Gilchrist

Personal details
- Education: University of Maine (BA); University of Texas at Austin (MA, MPA)

Anne Hall is an American diplomat and former Ambassador of the United States of America to Lithuania.

== Early life and education ==
Hall grew up in Orono, Maine, graduating from Orono High School in 1977. She stayed in her hometown to attend the University of Maine where she graduated from in 1981 with a Bachelor of Arts in international relations. She later attended the University of Texas at Austin, earning a Master of Arts (M.A.) and Master of Public Affairs (M.P.A.) in 1987 while studying in a joint program at the LBJ School of Public Affairs and Institute of Latin American Studies.

== Career ==
Hall joined the US Foreign Service in 1987. Some of her early postings included working as an economic officer in Brazil, a consular officer in Colombia, and as a desk officer in Peru. She joined the Executive Secretariat Staff of the Secretary of State in 1993 and was made a special assistant to Secretary Warren Christopher in 1994.

In 1997, Hall was sent to Shanghai to serve as chief of the consular section. She returned to Washington in 2000 to serve as a special assistant in the Bureau of Consular Affairs. She moved to the position of desk officer in the Office of Nordic and Baltic Affairs in 2001.

She briefly served as the consul general in Edinburgh, Scotland in 2003 before being named the senior Cyprus officer in the Office of the Special Cyprus Coordinator. While in this position she participated in the negotiations that led to the United Nations settlement of the Cyprus problem in 2004.

Hall was made the US consul general in Krakow, Poland in 2006. She left his position in 2009 to serve as the Deputy Chief of Mission in Vilnius, Lithuania. She served as Chargé d'Affaires in Lithuania from 2012 to 2013.

From 2013 to 2014 she served as the Director of the Office of Central European Affairs in the Bureau of European and Eurasian Affairs. In 2014 she was named acting Principal Deputy Assistant Secretary in the Bureau of Oceans, International Environmental and Scientific Affairs, a position which she held until being named ambassador in 2016.

Hall was nominated by US President Barack Obama in April 2016 to replace Deborah McCarthy as the U.S. Ambassador to Lithuania. She was confirmed by the US Senate on July 14, 2016, and began her term of appointment on September 16 of that year. Her mission was terminated on July 19, 2019.

Hall was the first American Consul General to be awarded the Knight's Cross of the Order of Merit of the Republic of Poland in July 2009.

Diplomatic posts
Preceded by Deborah McCarthy	United States Ambassador to Lithuania; 2016–2019	Succeeded by Robert S. Gilchrist
