= James W. Swihart =

American diplomat

United States Ambassador to Lithuania
- In office August 26, 1994 – July 16, 1997
- President: Bill Clinton
- Preceded by: Darryl Norman Johnson
- Succeeded by: Keith C. Smith

Personal details
- Born: July 25, 1946 (age 80)

James W. Swihart (born July 25, 1946) is an American diplomat who served as ambassador to Lithuania between August 26, 1994, and July 16, 1997.

== Diplomatic career ==
Swihart served as deputy chief of mission to Austria before being nominated as ambassador to Lithuania by President Bill Clinton. Swihart served as the United States ambassador to Lithuania between August 26, 1994, and July 16, 1997.
