= List of ambassadors of the United States to Lithuania =

Ambassador of the United States to Lithuania
- Seal of the United States Department of State

- Flag of a United States ambassador

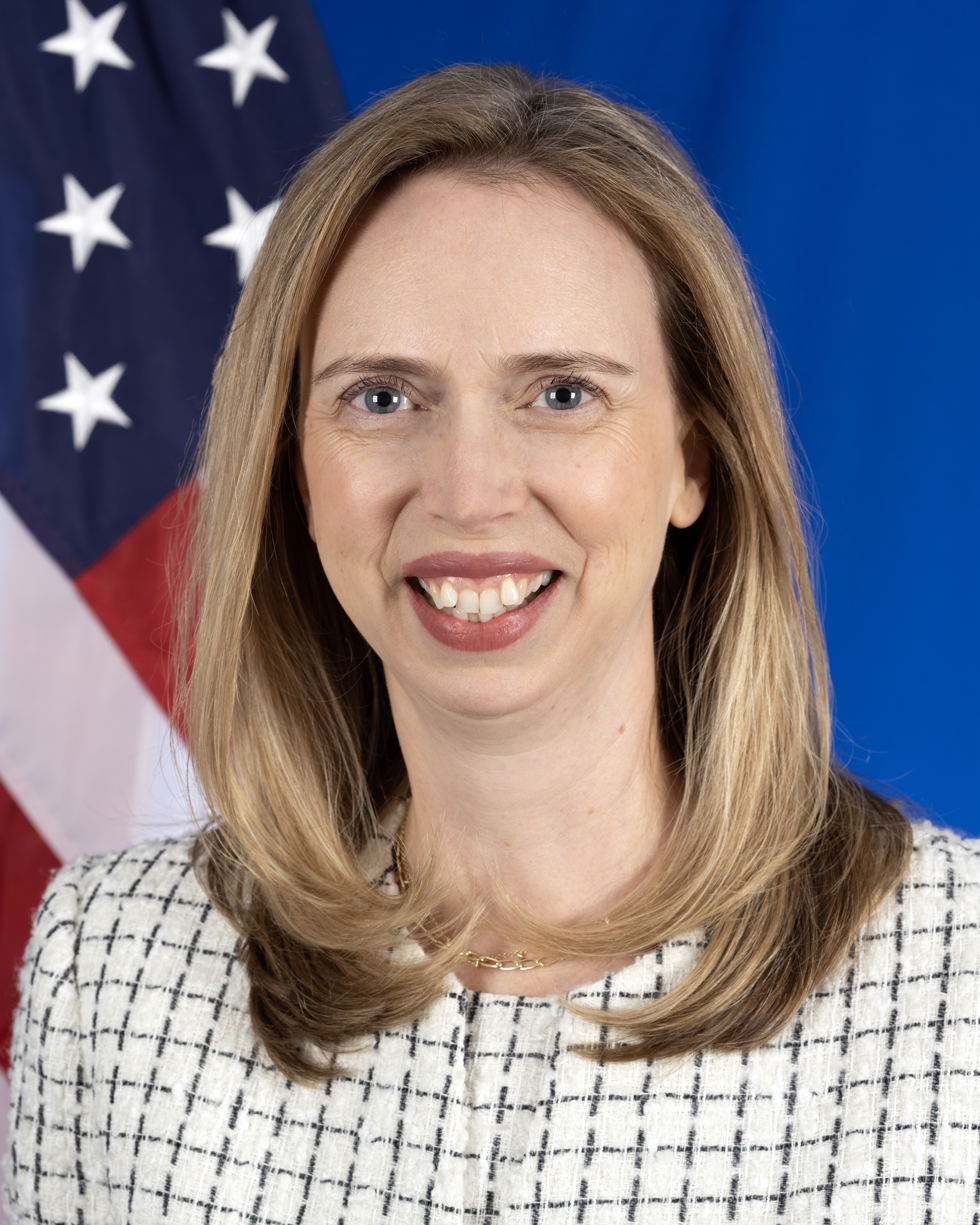
- Incumbent; Kara McDonald since January 26, 2024
- Nominator: The president of the United States
- Appointer: The president with Senate advice and consent
- Inaugural holder: Frederick W.B. Coleman as Envoy Extraordinary and Minister Plenipotentiary
- Formation: September 20, 1922
- Website: U.S. Embassy - Vilnius

This is a list of ambassadors of the United States to Lithuania.

The United States first established diplomatic relations with the Baltic states (Lithuania, Latvia, Estonia) in 1922. One ambassador, resident in Riga, Latvia, was appointed to all three nations. Relations with the three nations were broken after the Soviet invasion of the republics in 1940 at the beginning of World War II. The United States never recognized the legitimacy of the Soviet occupation of the Baltic states, nor the legitimacy of the governments of those states under Soviet occupation. Hence, diplomatic relations were not resumed until 1992 after the collapse of the Soviet Union.

The U.S. Embassy in Lithuania is located in Vilnius.

== Ambassadors ==
Name	Class	Title	Appointed	Presented credentials	Terminated mission	Notes
Frederick W. B. Coleman	Political appointee	Envoy Extraordinary and Minister Plenipotentiary	September 20, 1922	December 5, 1922	October 20, 1931	The ambassador was simultaneously accredited to Lithuania, Latvia, and Estonia, while resident in Riga, Latvia. During Coleman's tenure as non-resident Minister, the legation in Kovno (later Kaunas) was established on May 31, 1930, with Hugh S. Fullerton as Chargé d'Affaires ad interim.
Robert Peet Skinner	Career FSO	Envoy Extraordinary and Minister Plenipotentiary	September 23, 1931	February 13, 1932	Left post April 29, 1933	The ambassador was simultaneously accredited to Lithuania, Latvia, and Estonia, while resident in Riga, Latvia. Skinner was commissioned during a recess of the Senate and recommissioned after confirmation on December 17, 1931.
John Van Antwerp MacMurray	Career FSO	Envoy Extraordinary and Minister Plenipotentiary	August 28, 1933	December 20, 1933	February 12, 1936	The ambassador was simultaneously accredited to Lithuania, Latvia, and Estonia, while resident in Riga, Latvia. MacMurray was commissioned during a recess of the Senate and recommissioned after confirmation on January 15, 1934.
Arthur Bliss Lane	Career FSO	Envoy Extraordinary and Minister Plenipotentiary	January 24, 1936	June 24, 1936	September 16, 1937	The ambassador was simultaneously accredited to Lithuania, Latvia, and Estonia, while resident in Riga, Latvia.
Owen J.C. Norem	Political appointee	Envoy Extraordinary and Minister Plenipotentiary	August 23, 1937	November 26, 1937	June 15, 1940	Soviet forces occupied Lithuania on June 15, 1940, which effectively ended the U.S. diplomatic presence in Lithuania. Ambassador Norem departed Kaunas on July 30, 1940. Bernard Gufler was serving as Chargé d'Affaires ad interim when all U.S. diplomatic officials were withdrawn and the legation in Kaunas was officially closed on September 5, 1940.
Darryl Norman Johnson	Career FSO	Ambassador Extraordinary and Plenipotentiary	March 23, 1992	April 14, 1992	May 23, 1994	The United States resumed diplomatic relations with Lithuania on September 2, 1991. Embassy Vilnius was established October 2, 1991 with Darryl N. Johnson as Chargé d'Affaires ad interim pending his appointment as ambassador.
James W. Swihart	Career FSO	Ambassador Extraordinary and Plenipotentiary	August 26, 1994	September 26, 1994	July 16, 1997	
Keith C. Smith	Career FSO	Ambassador Extraordinary and Plenipotentiary	August 1, 1997	September 9, 1997	July 29, 2000	
John F. Tefft	Career FSO	Ambassador Extraordinary and Plenipotentiary	June 14, 2000	August 30, 2000	May 10, 2003	
Stephen D. Mull	Career FSO	Ambassador Extraordinary and Plenipotentiary	April 16, 2003	August 26, 2003	June 16, 2006	
John A. Cloud, Jr.	Career FSO	Ambassador Extraordinary and Plenipotentiary	May 30, 2006	August 17, 2006	January 20, 2009	
Anne E. Derse	Career FSO	Ambassador Extraordinary and Plenipotentiary	September 28, 2009	October 14, 2009	July 1, 2012	
Deborah A. McCarthy	Career FSO	Ambassador Extraordinary and Plenipotentiary	January 7, 2013	February 19, 2013	July 27, 2016	
Anne Hall	Career FSO	Ambassador Extraordinary and Plenipotentiary	July 14, 2016	October 7, 2016	July 19, 2019	
Robert S. Gilchrist	Career FSO	Ambassador Extraordinary and Plenipotentiary	January 14, 2020	February 4, 2020	August 12, 2023	
Kara McDonald	Career FSO	Ambassador Extraordinary and Plenipotentiary	November 29, 2023	January 26, 2024	Incumbent	

== See also ==
- Lithuania – United States relations
- Foreign relations of Lithuania
- Ambassadors of the United States
