= Lee A. Feinstein =

American policy-scholar and former diplomat

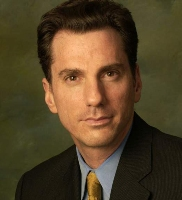
Lee Feinstein

Lee Andrew Feinstein (born 1959) is an American policy-scholar, and former diplomat and senior official at the US Departments of State and Defense. Feinstein held senior positions on leading Democratic presidential campaigns in 2008. He served as the United States Ambassador to Poland from 2009 to 2012, appointed by President Obama and unanimously confirmed by the US Senate. Feinstein was the inaugural dean at Indiana University's Lee H. Hamilton and Richard G. Lugar School of Global and International Studies. His nonpartisan scholarship has been recognized by leading Republicans and Democrats.

== Early life and education ==
Born to a Jewish family, Feinstein graduated from Georgetown University Law Center, from which he also holds a J.D. He also holds a Master of Arts in political science from the City University of New York, and an A.B. from Vassar College.

== Career ==
Feinstein was assistant director for research at the Arms Control Association in Washington from 1989 to 1994 before becoming special assistant for peacekeeping and peace enforcement policy in the Office of the Secretary of Defense at the Department of Defense. In 1995, Feinstein became a member and later principal deputy director of the Policy Planning Staff at the Department of State, a role he served in until 2001. Feinstein joined the Carnegie Endowment's Non-Proliferation Project as a visiting scholar in April 2001.

From 2002 to 2007, Feinstein served as deputy director of studies and senior fellow at the Council on Foreign Relations, and director of the council’s task force program which convened nonpartisan, blue ribbon commissions to issue reports on major foreign policy challenges facing the United States. Feinstein also served as co-director of the CFR-Freedom House Task Force on “Enhancing U.S. Leadership at the United Nations,” co-chaired by Rep. David Dreier and Rep. Lee Hamilton (2003).

Feinstein was a presidentially appointed trustee of the United States Holocaust Memorial Council and currently serves as vice-chair of its Committee on Conscience, which advises the museum’s Simon Skjodt Center for the Prevention of Genocide.

Feinstein, in his museum capacity, participated in two trips to Myanmar and refugee camps in Cox's Bazar in Bangladesh and raised concerns with Burmese authorities in Naypydaw.

Feinstein also served as an advisor to the congressionally mandated Task Force on the United Nations, chaired by former Speaker of the House Newt Gingrich and former Senate Majority Leader George J. Mitchell. From 2007 to 2008, Feinstein was national security director for the Clinton presidential campaign, and later served as a foreign policy advisor to the Barack Obama campaign. From 2008 to 2009, Feinstein served as a visiting senior fellow at the Brookings Institution. From 2009 to 2012, Feinstein served as U.S. Ambassador to the Republic of Poland. He was confirmed by unanimous consent by the United States Senate.

Feinstein is admitted to the bars of New York and Washington, D.C. He is a member of the Council on Foreign Relations and serves on the board of trustees of NAFSA: the Association of International Educators, and The International Center in Indianapolis.

=== Ambassador to Poland ===
On July 17, 2009, President Obama announced that he intended to nominate Feinstein as Ambassador to Poland. Feinstein was formally nominated on July 20, 2009 and was confirmed by the Senate on September 22, 2009 by unanimous consent. On October 20, 2009, Ambassador Feinstein presented his credentials to the President of Poland, Lech Kaczyński.

During his tenure, Feinstein signed an agreement to establish a U.S. Air Force Aviation Detachment in Poland, the first continuous presence of U.S. forces in the country. He also signed an agreement, witnessed by Secretary Clinton, to establish missile defenses in Poland, resolving an important diplomatic issue after the Obama Administration had moved away from Bush era missile defense postures. Feinstein was also involved in efforts to strengthen energy cooperation in Central Europe. In April 2012, Ambassador Feinstein accompanied President Obama to the location where the Museum of History of Polish Jews in Warsaw was under construction, making Obama the first world leader to visit the site.

As ambassador, Feinstein joined with the Polish government and civil society to promote democracy in the region, advanced deeper understanding of contemporary Poland in the United States, and supported civil society in the country, including hosting the parents of Matthew Shepard and introducing them to Polish parents of LGBTQ children.

=== Hamilton Lugar School at Indiana University ===
Feinstein was named the founding dean of Indiana University's School of Global and International Studies in 2014, a post he no longer holds. In 2018, Feinstein played a major role in having the school renamed after the bipartisan foreign policy leaders and long-time Indiana Members of Congress Senator Richard Lugar and Congressman Lee Hamilton.

Under Feinstein’s leadership, the school has grown to be one of the nation’s largest international affairs schools, offering over 70 languages, with 1,100 students and 120 full-time faculty. It is a global leader in the study of international affairs and the strategic languages and cultures that shape the world. In 2018, the school received the largest number of grants in the nation to global institutes that the Department of Education designated as National Resource Centers under the prestigious Title VI of the National Security Education Act. The Hamilton Lugar school has also received major grants supporting Russian and Korean studies. In 2020, the university and school were designated as a “top performing institution” in the number of Boren Awards won by its students, tied for second in the nation.

Feinstein has recruited many prominent foreign policy voices and scholars to address the Hamilton Lugar school at the student-focused America’s Role in the World Conference, which he founded in 2015, ranging from Rohingya Burmese activist Wai Wai Nu to IU alumnus and former defense secretary Robert Gates to Senator Todd Young who delivered the inaugural Lugar lecture and former US Ambassador Marie Yovanovitch.

Under Feinstein’s stewardship, the school raised 120% of the university’s Bicentennial Fundraising Goal, raising $30 million. This funding established seven endowed professorships; three new institutes, and some 250 endowed scholarships and fellowships.

=== McLarty Associates ===
From 2013 to 2014, Feinstein was senior director at McLarty Associates; he currently serves as president.

== Author ==
Feinstein has written widely on foreign policy and national security. He is the author of "Means to an End: U.S. Interest and the International Criminal Court" (Brookings, 2009) with Tod Lindberg of the Hudson Institute. This book received bipartisan praise. Republican Senator John McCain described it as "an important contribution to the ongoing debate over U.S. involvement with the International Criminal Court. As our country continues to seek ways in which to hold perpetrators of atrocities to account, their analysis and argument will play a key role in the thinking in this area." Writing in Foreign Affairs, Princeton University Professor John Ikenberry said, "Books of this sort are all too rare. Two experienced policy intellectuals, one liberal, one conservative, have come together to find common ground on a controversial foreign policy issue." Madeleine Albright said the book was “Rigorous in its arguments and humane in its conclusions, the volume is an indispensable guide for scholars and policymakers alike.”

An international lawyer, Feinstein wrote the Council on Foreign Relations report "Darfur and Beyond: What Is Needed to Prevent Mass Atrocities," and which was featured in the Emmy Award-winning multimedia council project "Crisis Guide-Darfur."

Feinstein is the author of numerous articles, book chapters and op-eds, and he is a frequent commentator for the national and international media. His writings include "UN Divided" in the National Interest and "A Duty to Prevent," written with Anne-Marie Slaughter in Foreign Affairs. His book chapters include: "Darfur and Beyond: What Is Needed to Prevent Mass Atrocities" in Beyond Humanitarianism (Council on Foreign Relations, 2007) and "Beyond Words: U.S. Policy and the Responsibility to Protect" in The Responsibility to Protect: the Global Moral Compact for the 21st Century (Palgrave 2008).

== Awards ==
Feinstein was awarded the Commander's Cross with the Order of the Star of Merit of the Republic of Poland by Polish President Bronisław Komorowski in Warsaw in October 2012 "for his outstanding contributions to Polish-American relations by strengthening cooperation between Poland and the United States."

In 2011, Feinstein received two medals from the Veteran's Association of Combatants of the Republic of Poland and Former Political Prisoners for his leadership in strengthening security and cooperation between Poland and the United States.In 2019, Feinstein was awarded Indiana University’s Bicentennial Medal.

== Personal life ==
Feinstein is married to Elaine Monaghan, a Scot who is a journalist and member of the faculty at the Media School at Indiana University. They have two children.

Diplomatic posts
Preceded by Victor Ashe	United States Ambassador to Poland; 2009–2012	Succeeded by Stephen Mull
