= Stephen D. Mull =

American diplomat (born 1958)

Stephen Mull
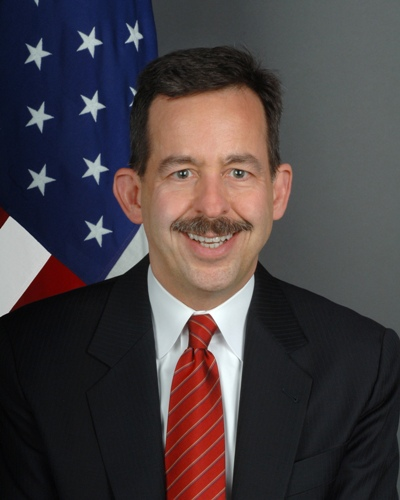
- Official portrait, 2010

Under Secretary of State for Political Affairs Acting
- In office June 5, 2018 – August 29, 2018
- President: Donald Trump
- Preceded by: Tom Shannon
- Succeeded by: David Hale

Coordinator for Iran Nuclear Implementation
- In office September 25, 2015 – August 2017
- President: Barack Obama; Donald Trump
- Preceded by: Joseph Macmanus (Acting)
- Succeeded by: Brian Hook (Special Representative for Iran)

United States Ambassador to Poland
- In office November 8, 2012 – August 29, 2015
- President: Barack Obama
- Preceded by: Lee Feinstein
- Succeeded by: Paul Jones

23rd Executive Secretary of the United States Department of State
- In office June 21, 2009 – October 5, 2012
- President: Barack Obama
- Preceded by: Daniel Smith
- Succeeded by: John Bass

Assistant Secretary of State for Political-Military Affairs Acting
- In office January 11, 2007 – August 8, 2008
- President: George W. Bush
- Preceded by: John Hillen
- Succeeded by: Mark Kimmitt

United States Ambassador to Lithuania
- In office August 26, 2003 – June 16, 2006
- President: George W. Bush
- Preceded by: John Tefft
- Succeeded by: John Cloud

Personal details
- Born: April 30, 1958 (age 68) Reading, Pennsylvania, U.S.
- Education: Georgetown University

Stephen D. Mull (born April 30, 1958) is a Senior Foreign Service officer who was most recently the Acting Undersecretary of State for Political Affairs. He previously served as United States Ambassador to Poland, Acting Assistant Secretary of State for Political-Military Affairs and United States Ambassador to Lithuania.

Ambassador Mull holds the rank of Career Ambassador, the highest diplomatic rank in the United States Foreign Service.

On September 18, 2015, Mull was appointed as the United States Lead Coordinator for Iran Nuclear Implementation, tasked with carrying out the terms of the Joint Comprehensive Plan of Action by United States Secretary of State John Kerry.

In 2024, Secretary of State Antony Blinken appointed him to coordinate the peaceful transfer of power with the Trump Presidential Transition Team.

As of 2026, Mull is the Vice Provost for Global Affairs at the University of Virginia.

== Biography ==
Mull was born in Reading, Pennsylvania. He graduated from Georgetown University with a Bachelor of Science degree in International Politics from the School of Foreign Service in 1980.

Mull is a career member of the Senior Foreign Service in the class of Career Ambassador. He previously served as the Deputy Chief of Mission in Jakarta, Indonesia, and has served as a Consular or Political Officer for the U.S. Missions in Poland, the Bahamas, and South Africa since the beginning of his career in the Foreign Service in 1982.

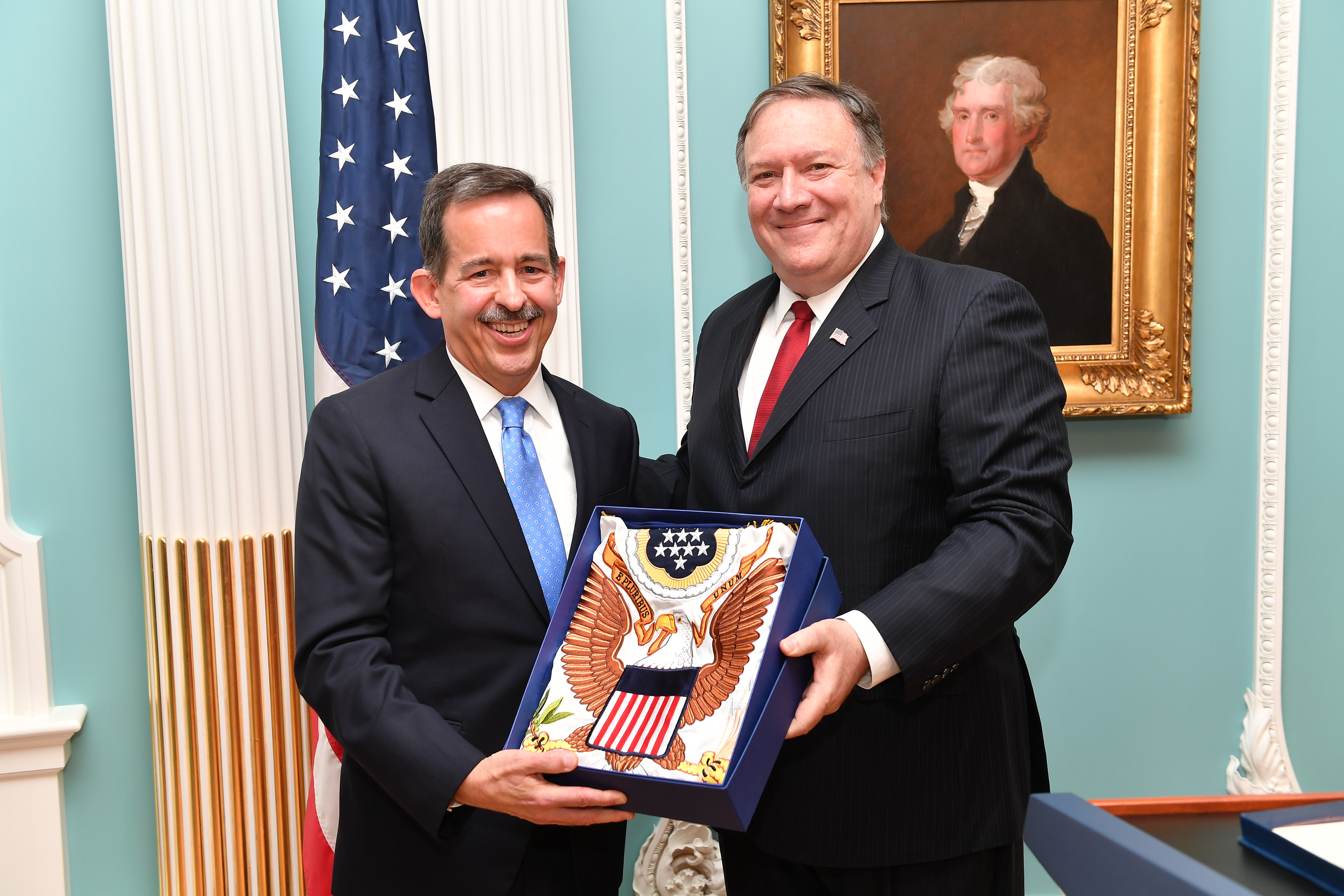
Mull poses with Secretary of State Michael R. Pompeo during a flag ceremony at the Department of State in Washington, D.C., on July 27, 2018.

Prior to his assignment in Jakarta, Mull worked as Deputy Director of the State Department Operations Center, as Political Counselor at the U.S. Embassy in Warsaw, Poland, as Director of the Office of Southern European Affairs in the Bureau of European Affairs, and as Deputy Executive Secretary in the Office of the Secretary of State.

On March 10, 2003, then-U.S. President George W. Bush nominated Mull as the U.S. Ambassador to Lithuania. After being confirmed by the Senate, he assumed his position on August 26, 2003. He completed his tour of duty on July 18, 2006.

On April 30, 2009, Mull testified before the U.S. Senate Foreign Relations Committee on international efforts to combat piracy off the coast of Somalia.

Mull is married to Cheri Stephan. The Mulls have one child, Ryan.

== Ambassador to Poland ==
Stephen Mull was appointed the United States Ambassador to Poland on October 24, 2012. He speaks Polish fluently. He served in that role until 2015.

In June 1986, the Polish government ordered Mull, then the U.S. second secretary at the embassy, to leave Poland following his alleged attempt to photograph radar installations.

== Awards ==
- Director General's Award for Political Reporting, 1988
- Superior Honor Award (four times)
- Balker-Wilkins Award
- Presidential Meritorious Service Award, 2003
- Order of Merit of the Republic of Poland (5th Class), 1997
- Order for Merits to Lithuania (3rd Class), 2006
- Order of Polonia Restituta (2nd Class), 2015

Diplomatic posts
Preceded by John Tefft	United States Ambassador to Lithuania; 2003–2006	Succeeded by John Cloud
Preceded by Lee Feinstein	United States Ambassador to Poland; 2012–2015	Succeeded by Paul Jones
Preceded by Joseph Macmanus; Acting	Coordinator for Iran Nuclear Implementation; 2015–2017	Succeeded by Brian Hook as Special Representative for Iran
Political offices
Preceded by John Hillen	Assistant Secretary of State for Political-Military Affairs; Acting; 2007–2008	Succeeded by Mark Kimmitt
Preceded by Daniel Smith	Executive Secretary of the Department of State; 2009–2012	Succeeded by John Bass
Preceded by Tom Shannon	Under Secretary of State for Political Affairs; Acting; 2018	Succeeded by David Hale
