= Deborah McCarthy =

American diplomat

Deborah A. McCarthy
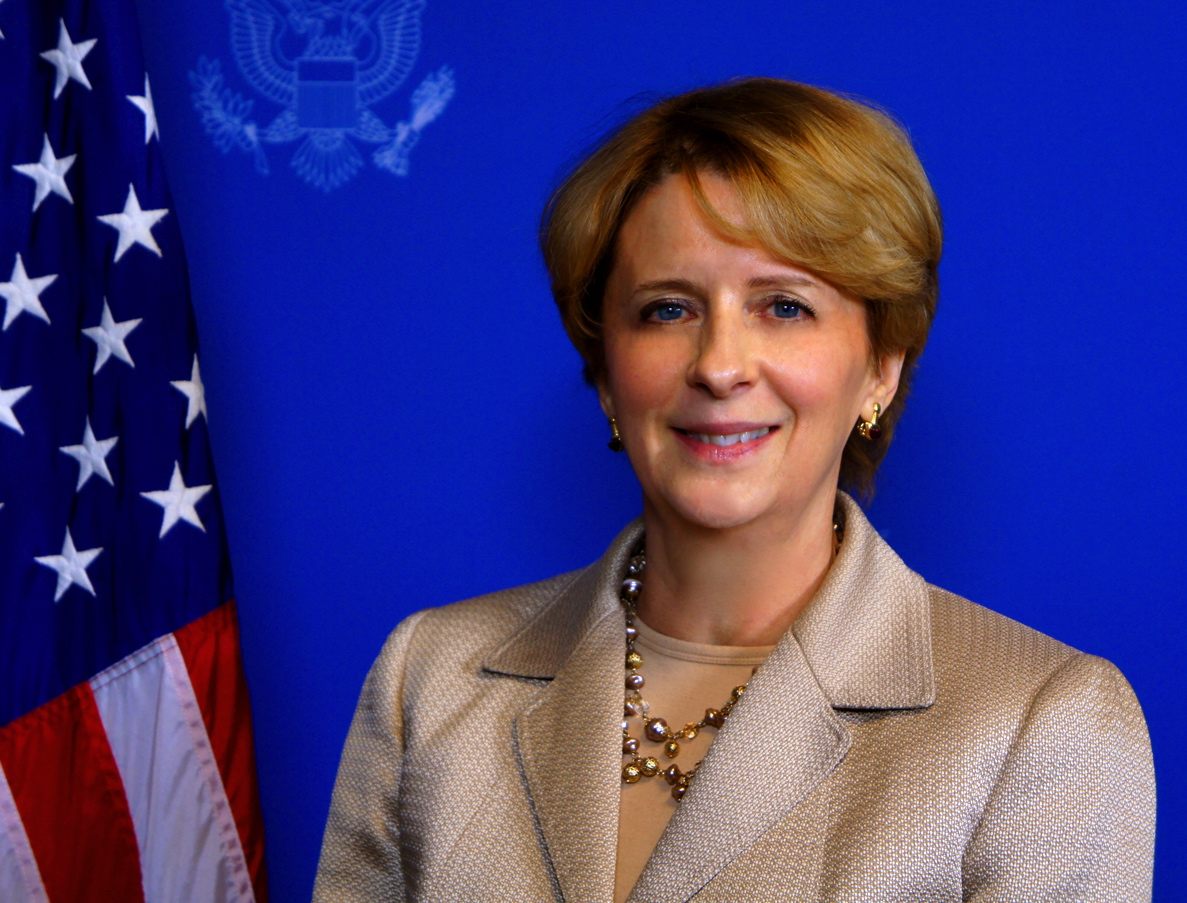

United States Ambassador to Lithuania
- In office February 5, 2013 – July 27, 2016
- President: Barack Obama
- Preceded by: Anne Derse
- Succeeded by: Anne Hall

Personal details
- Education: University of Virginia; Georgetown University

Deborah A. McCarthy is an American diplomat and a former Ambassador of the United States of America to Lithuania.

== Early life and education ==
McCarthy spent much of her youth in France and Argentina, where her father served in U.S. missions. McCarthy earned a Bachelor’s in Economics at the University of Virginia in 1976. She attended Georgetown University, where she received both an M.A. in Economics and an M.S. in Foreign Service. She also has a Certificate in Airline Strategic Management from the International Air Transport Association (IATA).

== Career ==
Her early career included working for an NGO and a major New York bank.

She then became a career diplomat in the Foreign Service. Her early assignments included tours as Consul General in Montreal, Canada; Deputy Chief of Mission at the U.S. Embassy in Managua, Nicaragua; and Economic Counselor in Paris, France and Port au Prince, Haiti. She also served as the financial economist at the U.S. Embassy in Rome, Italy and at the U.S. Department of Treasury as well as desk officer for Guatemala. She served as Senior Advisor for Counter Terrorism from 2004 to 2006, and as Deputy Assistant Secretary in the Bureau of International Narcotics and Law Enforcement. From 2008 to 2010, McCarthy served as Deputy Chief of Mission at the U.S. Embassy in Athens, and from 2006 to 2008, Special Coordinator for Venezuelan Affairs. Prior to being nominated as Ambassador to Lithuania, McCarthy was the Principal Deputy Assistant Secretary of State for Economic and Business Affairs, responsible for global economic engagement and negotiations from 2010 to 2013.

On September 13, 2012, U.S. President Barack Obama nominated her to replace Anne Derse as U.S. Ambassador to Lithuania. After her nomination was approved, she began her ambassadorial assignment on February 5, 2013.

Ms. McCarthy is the recipient of the Presidential Merit Service Award, four Superior Honor Awards, and six Senior Foreign Service Performance Awards.

The U.S. Air Force brought two Lockheed Martin F-22 Raptor tactical stealth fighter aircraft to Lithuania on April 27, 2015 for several hours. McCarthy said that the visit of the U.S. Air Force jets demonstrated the American support of NATO and “commitment to Article 5 of the Washington treaty and collective defense".

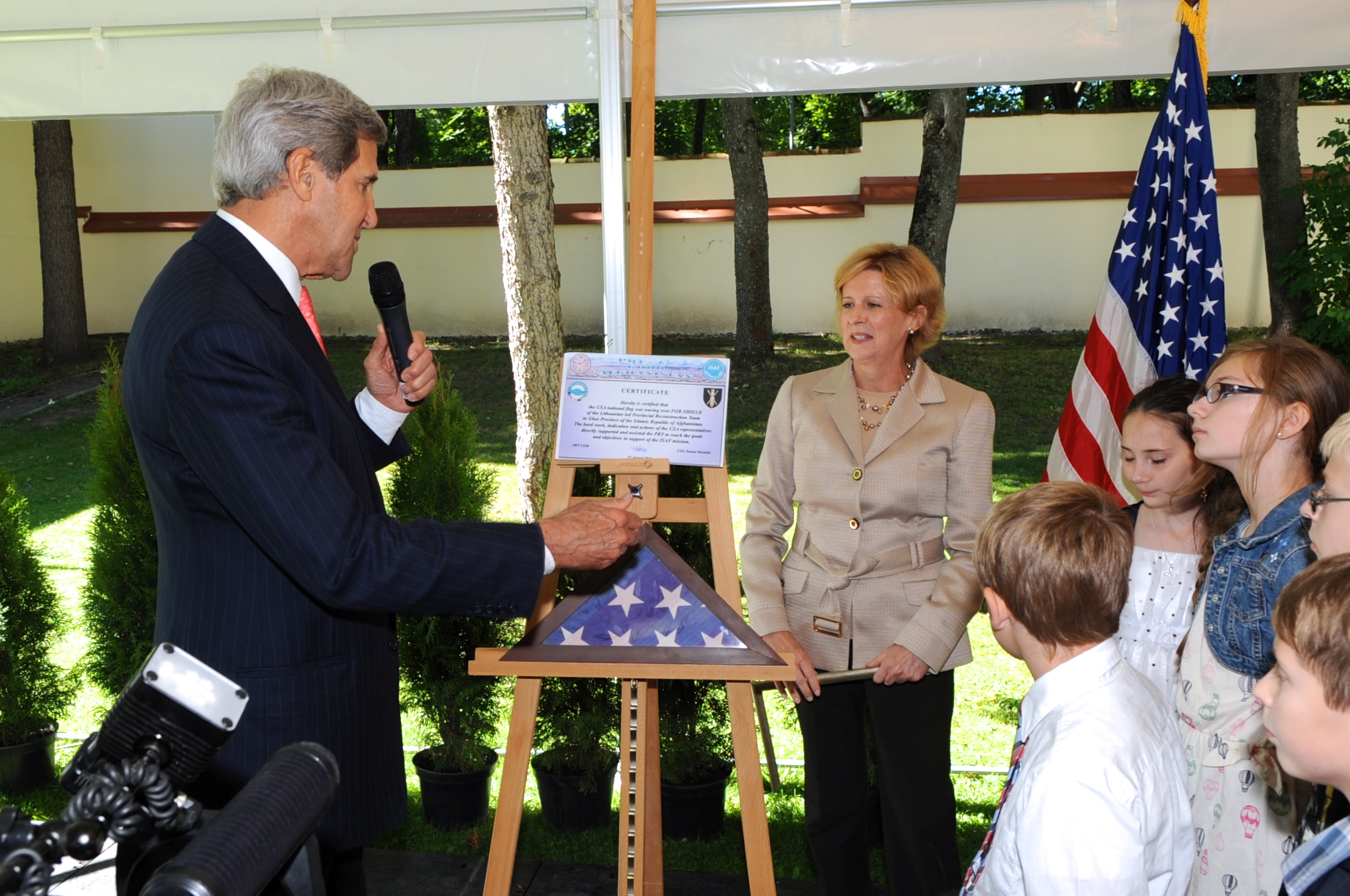
Secretary Kerry Unveils Flag that Flew Over Lithuanian PRT in Afghanistan

== Personal ==
McCarthy speaks French, Spanish, Greek, Italian and Haitian Creole.
