= Anne E. Derse =

American diplomat (born 1954)

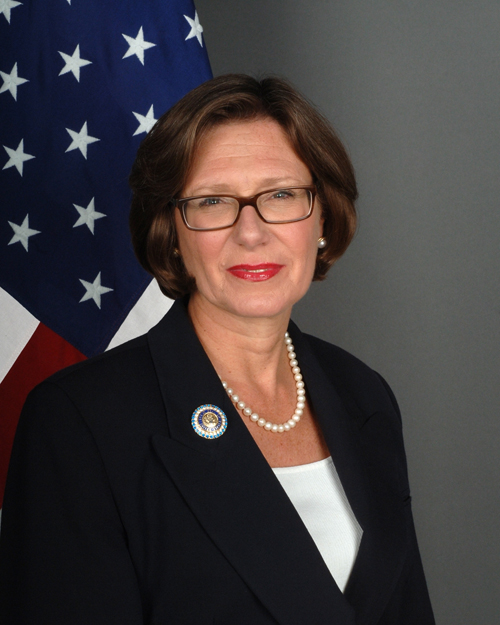

United States Ambassador to Lithuania
- In office October 14, 2009 – July 1, 2012
- President: Barack Obama
- Preceded by: John Cloud
- Succeeded by: Deborah A. McCarthy

United States Ambassador to Azerbaijan
- In office July 3, 2006 – January 22, 2009
- President: George W. Bush; Barack Obama
- Preceded by: Reno L. Harnish
- Succeeded by: Matthew Bryza

Personal details
- Born: 1954 (age 71–72) Lakewood, Ohio
- Spouse: E. Mason "Hank" Hendrickson
- Education: Macalester College

Anne Elizabeth Derse (born 1954) is an American diplomat who served as U.S. Ambassador to Azerbaijan from 2006 to 2009 and Lithuania from 2009 to 2012.

== Education and personal life ==
Anne E. Derse completed her Bachelor of Arts in French and Linguistics from Macalester College in St. Paul, Minnesota, in 1976 and her Master of Arts in international relations from Johns Hopkins University's Paul H. Nitze School of Advanced International Studies (SAIS) in 1981. She also graduated with distinction from the State Department's Economic and Commercial Studies program in 1989.

Derse is married to fellow (now retired) foreign service officer E. Mason "Hank" Hendrickson.

== Career ==
Derse joined the Department of State in 1981, and served in Trinidad and Tobago from 1981 to 1983. From 1985 to 1988 she followed her husband to Singapore, where he served as First Secretary of the United States Embassy in Singapore there; however, he was expelled by the Singaporean government in May 1988 for his alleged involvement with opposition politicians Francis Seow and Patrick Seong, in an incident which came to be known as the "Hendrickson affair".

Her most influential role came in 1999 when, as Minister Counselor for Economic Affairs at the U.S. Mission to the European Union (USEU), she led the Mission's economic team covering U.S.-EU economic relations and served as the last U.S. Commissioner on the Tripartite Gold Commission, which adjudicated sovereign claims for Nazi gold recovered by the Allies after World War II. In late 2004 she assisted in establishing the new U.S. Embassy in Baghdad, serving there as Minister Counselor for Economic Affairs.

Derse was the U.S. Ambassador to the Republic of Azerbaijan from July 3, 2006 to January 22, 2009.

On June 4, 2009, it was announced that Derse would be appointed by President Barack Obama to serve as ambassador to Lithuania. She was confirmed by the Senate on July 24, 2009. She was sworn in on September 28, 2009, and presented her credentials on October 14, 2009. She served until July 1, 2012.

Diplomatic posts
Preceded by Reno L. Harnish	United States Ambassador to Azerbaijan; 2003–2006	Succeeded by Donald Lu
Preceded by John Cloud	Ambassador of the United States to Lithuania; 2009-2012	Succeeded by Deborah A. McCarthy
