= Reno L. Harnish =

American diplomat

Reno Leon Harnish, III
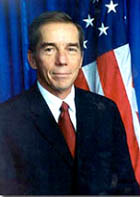

United States Ambassador to Azerbaijan
- In office December 1, 2003 – April 24, 2006
- President: George W. Bush
- Preceded by: Ross L. Wilson
- Succeeded by: Anne E. Derse

Personal details
- Born: 1949 (age 76–77)
- Education: San Diego State University; American University

Reno Leon Harnish III (born 1949) is an American who was the director of the Center for Environment and National Security (CENS) at the Scripps Institution of Oceanography from 2009 to 2017. He was a career member of the U.S. Foreign Service (American diplomat) and formerly served as principal deputy assistant secretary of state for Oceans, Environment and Science.

== Life ==
Harnish received a bachelor's degree in Political Science, Economics from San Diego State University, a Master's in International Studies from American University, and a Master's in Economics in 1975.

Before entering the Foreign Service, Mr. Harnish worked as a research assistant at the American Enterprise Institute, an international economist at the U.S. Department of Treasury, and as a clerk for Congressman Dave Martin of Nebraska.

== Foreign service career ==
Later, he served as the environment, science and technology counselor at the U.S. Embassy in Rome, as economic and commercial counselor at the U.S. Embassy to the German Democratic Republic, in the Office of Developed Country Trade at the Department of State, as an economic officer at the U.S. Embassy in Vienna, Austria, a political officer in the Status Liaison Office in Saipan, and an economic commercial officer at the U.S. Embassy in Lagos, Nigeria.

From 1992–1995 Harnish led U.S. policy on Central Asian politics and scientific cooperation with the New Independent States in the Department of State.

In 1995 to 1996 he attended Seminar XXI, at the Massachusetts Institute of Technology.

Harnish served as the deputy chief of mission at the U.S. Embassy in Stockholm and engaged in Baltic Sea cooperation.

Later, he served as deputy chief of mission in Cairo, Egypt, where he was responsible for the operations of a $2 billion plus, 2,400 employee Mission.

He took up his post as chief of mission at the U.S. Office in Pristina, on August 30, 2002.

On August 12, 2003, Harnish was sworn in as ambassador to Azerbaijan. He completed his tour of duty in Baku in April 2006 immediately prior to taking his current position as principal deputy assistant secretary of state, Bureau of Oceans and International Environmental and Scientific Affairs.

Mr. Harnish speaks German, Italian, Swedish, and some Azerbaijani. He was honored for Presidential Meritorious Service, received Senior performance pay twice, and has been awarded a Meritorious and two Superior Honor Awards.

== Sources ==
- Azerbaijan relations at U.S. State Dept.
- Harnish Bio at U.S. State Dept.

Diplomatic posts
Preceded by Ross L. Wilson	United States Ambassador to Azerbaijan; 2003–2006	Succeeded by Anne E. Derse
