= John Cloud =

American diplomat

John Albert Cloud
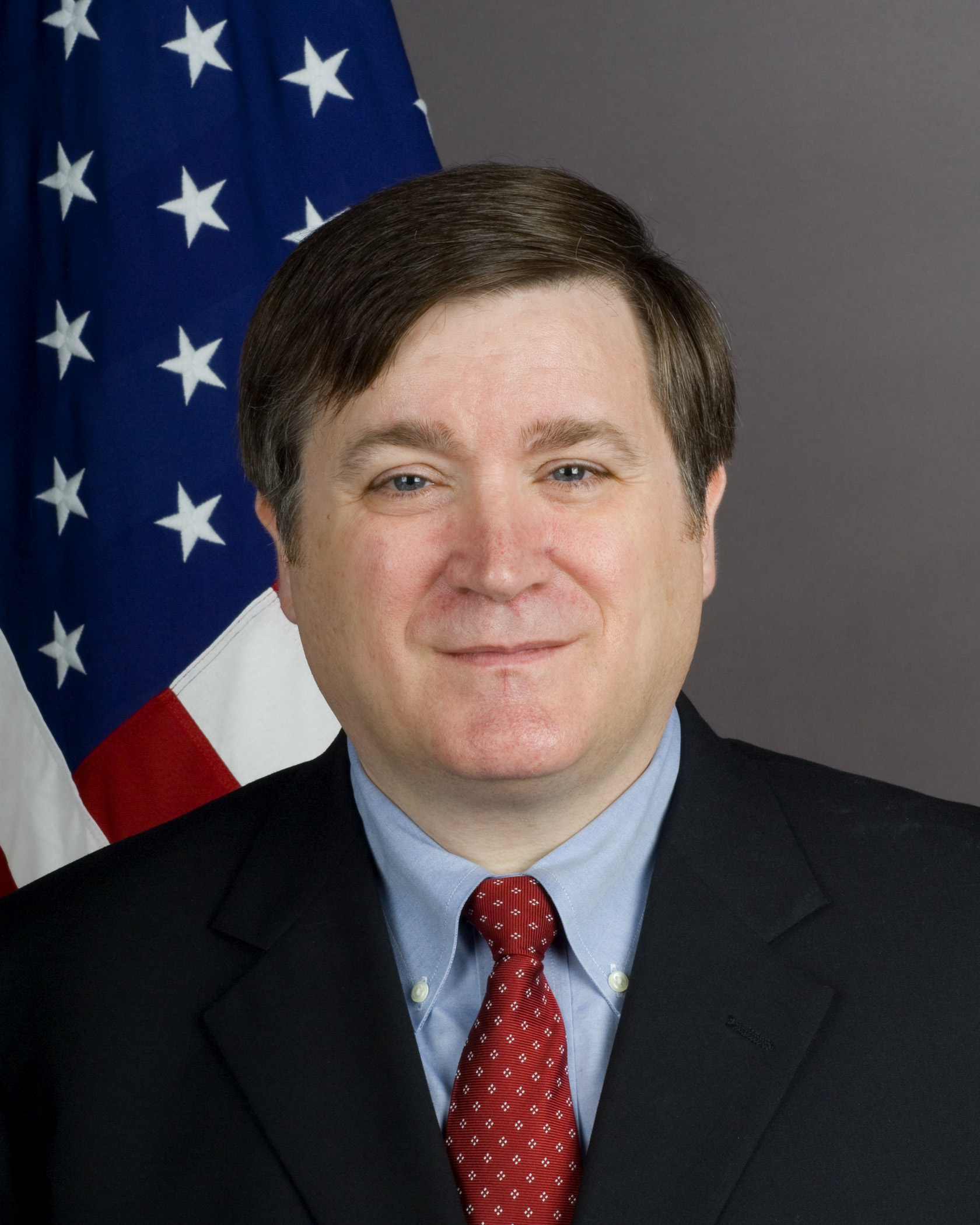

United States Ambassador to Lithuania
- In office May 30, 2006 – January 20, 2009
- President: George W. Bush
- Preceded by: Stephen D. Mull
- Succeeded by: Anne E. Derse

Personal details
- Born: 1953 (age 72–73)
- Spouse: Mary Elizabeth Cloud
- Education: University of Connecticut; George Washington University

John Albert Cloud (born 1953) is a professor in the National Security Affairs Department of the U.S. Naval War College and former ambassador for the United States of America to the Republic of Lithuania. Cloud also holds the William B. Ruger Chair of National Security Economics while specializing in European and economic issues.

== Education ==
He has completed bachelor studies in University of Connecticut in 1975, and a Masters in International Affairs in George Washington University in 1977. From February 28, 2005, to September 2, 2005, he was a US ambassador to Germany ad interim. From July 18, 2006, to July 7, 2009, he served as ambassador.

== Career ==
Cloud served as U.S. Ambassador to the Republic of Lithuania from August 2006 to July 2009 and he previously served as the Deputy Chief of Mission at the United States Embassy located in Berlin, Germany.

Cloud was also a special assistant to the President and Senior Director for International Economic Affairs on the National Security Council staff from 2001 - 2003. Cloud later became Deputy Chief of Mission at the U.S. Mission to the European Union from 1999 to 2001. During this period of time from 1996 to 1999, Cloud served as the Deputy Chief of Mission at the American Embassy in Warsaw, Poland.

From 1991 to 1995, Cloud was the Economic Counselor at the American Embassy in Bonn, Germany. He served at the State Department from 1988 to 1991. He serves as a professor in the National Security Affairs Department at the Naval War College in Newport, Rhode Island, where he holds the William B. Ruger Chair of National Security Economics.

== Family ==
He has a wife Mary Elizabeth and 2 children.

Diplomatic posts
Preceded by Stephen D. Mull	Ambassador of the United States to Lithuania; 2006-2009	Succeeded by Anne E. Derse
Preceded by Daniel R. Coats	Ambassador of the United States to Germany; 2005	Succeeded by William R. Timken Jr.
