= List of ambassadors of the United States to Turkey =

Ambassador of the United States to Turkey
- ABD'nin Türkiye Büyükelçisi
- Seal of the United States Department of State

- Flag of a United States ambassador

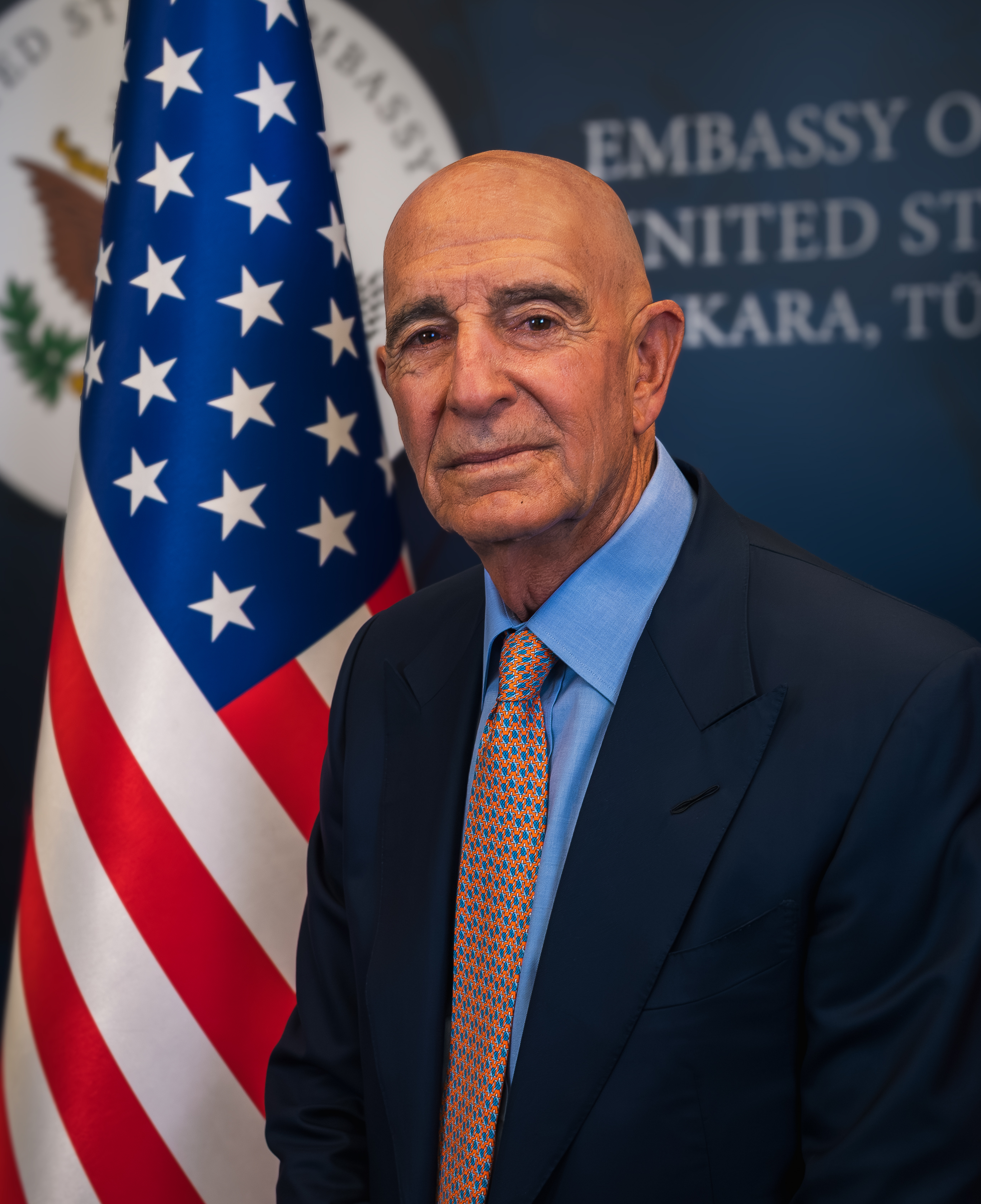
- Incumbent; Tom Barrack since May 14, 2025
- Nominator: The president of the United States
- Inaugural holder: George W. Erving as Chargé d'Affaires
- Formation: 1831
- Website: U.S. Embassy – Ankara

The United States has maintained many high level contacts with Turkey since the 19th century.

== Ottoman Empire ==
=== Chargé d'Affaires ===
- George W. Erving (before 1831)
- David Porter (September 13, 1831 – May 23, 1840)

=== Minister Resident ===
- David Porter (May 23, 1840 – March 3, 1843)
- Dabney Smith Carr (February 29, 1844 – October 20, 1849)
- George Perkins Marsh (March 11, 1850 – December 19, 1853)
- Carroll Spence (February 9, 1854 – December 12, 1857)
- James Williams (May 27, 1858 – May 25, 1861)
- Edward Joy Morris (October 22, 1861 – October 25, 1870)
- Wayne MacVeagh (October 25, 1870 – June 10, 1871)
- George H. Boker (March 25, 1872 – May 1, 1875)
- Horace Maynard (June 12, 1875 – July 15, 1880)
- James Longstreet (December 14, 1880 – April 29, 1881)
- Lewis Wallace (September 6, 1881 – September 4, 1882)

=== Envoy Extraordinary and Minister Plenipotentiary ===
- Lewis Wallace (September 4, 1882 – May 15, 1885)
- Samuel S. Cox (August 25, 1885 – September 14, 1886)
- Oscar S. Straus (July 1, 1887 – June 16, 1889)
- Solomon Hirsch (December 28, 1889 – June 16, 1892)
- David P. Thompson (January 11, 1893 – May 1, 1893)
- Alexander W. Terrell (July 7, 1893 – June 15, 1897)
- James Burrill Angell (September 3, 1897 – August 13, 1898)
- Oscar S. Straus (October 15, 1898 – December 20, 1899)
- John G. A. Leishman (March 29, 1901 – October 5, 1906)

=== Ambassador Extraordinary and Plenipotentiary ===
- John G. A. Leishman (October 5, 1906 – June 10, 1909)
- Oscar S. Straus (October 4, 1909 – September 3, 1910)
- William Woodville Rockhill (August 28, 1911 – November 20, 1913)
- Henry Morgenthau, Sr. (December 11, 1913 – February 1, 1916)
- Abram I. Elkus (October 2, 1916 – April 20, 1917)

The Ottoman Empire severed diplomatic relations with the United States on April 20, 1917, after the United States declared war against Germany on April 4, 1917. Normal diplomatic relations were re-established with the Empire's successor state, Turkey, in 1927.

== Republic of Turkey ==
- Joseph Grew (October 12, 1927 – March 13, 1932)
- Charles Hitchcock Sherrill (May 20, 1932 – March 23, 1933)
- Robert Peet Skinner (October 16, 1933 – January 16, 1936)
- John Van Antwerp MacMurray (March 16, 1936 – November 28, 1941)
- Laurence A. Steinhardt (March 10, 1942 – April 2, 1945)
- Edwin C. Wilson (June 11, 1945 – August 20, 1948)
- George Wadsworth (October 1, 1948 – January 2, 1952)
- George C. McGhee (January 15, 1952 – June 19, 1953)
- Avra M. Warren (September 17, 1953 – February 17, 1956)
- Fletcher Warren (June 13, 1956 – November 15, 1960)
- Raymond A. Hare (April 5, 1961 – August 27, 1965)
- Parker T. Hart (October 11, 1965 – October 3, 1968)
- Robert Komer (December 3, 1968 – May 7, 1969)
- William J. Handley (July 1, 1969 – April 19, 1973)
- William B. Macomber Jr. (May 16, 1973 – June 15, 1977)
- Ronald I. Spiers (July 12, 1977 – January 11, 1980)
- James W. Spain (February 26, 1980 – August 16, 1981)
- Robert Strausz-Hupé (September 7, 1981 – May 18, 1989)
- Morton I. Abramowitz (August 1, 1989 – July 25, 1991)
- Richard Clark Barkley (November 8, 1991 – December 15, 1994)
- Marc Grossman (January 3, 1995 – June 1, 1997)
- Mark Robert Parris (November 12, 1997 – September 8, 2000)
- W. Robert Pearson (September 21, 2000 – July 23, 2003)
- Eric S. Edelman (August 29, 2003 – June 19, 2005)
- Ross Wilson (December 8, 2005 – August 9, 2008)
- James Franklin Jeffrey (December 3, 2008 – July 31, 2010)
- Francis J. Ricciardone (January 28, 2011 – July 8, 2014)
- Jess L. Baily (July 9, 2014 – September 8, 2014)
- John R. Bass (October 20, 2014 – October 15, 2017)
- David M. Satterfield (August 28, 2019 – January 7, 2022)
- Jeff Flake (January 26, 2022 – September 1, 2024)
- Michael B. Goldman (Chargé d'affaires ad interim) (September 1, 2024 – May 7, 2025)
- Tom Barrack (May 14, 2025 – Present)

== Gallery ==
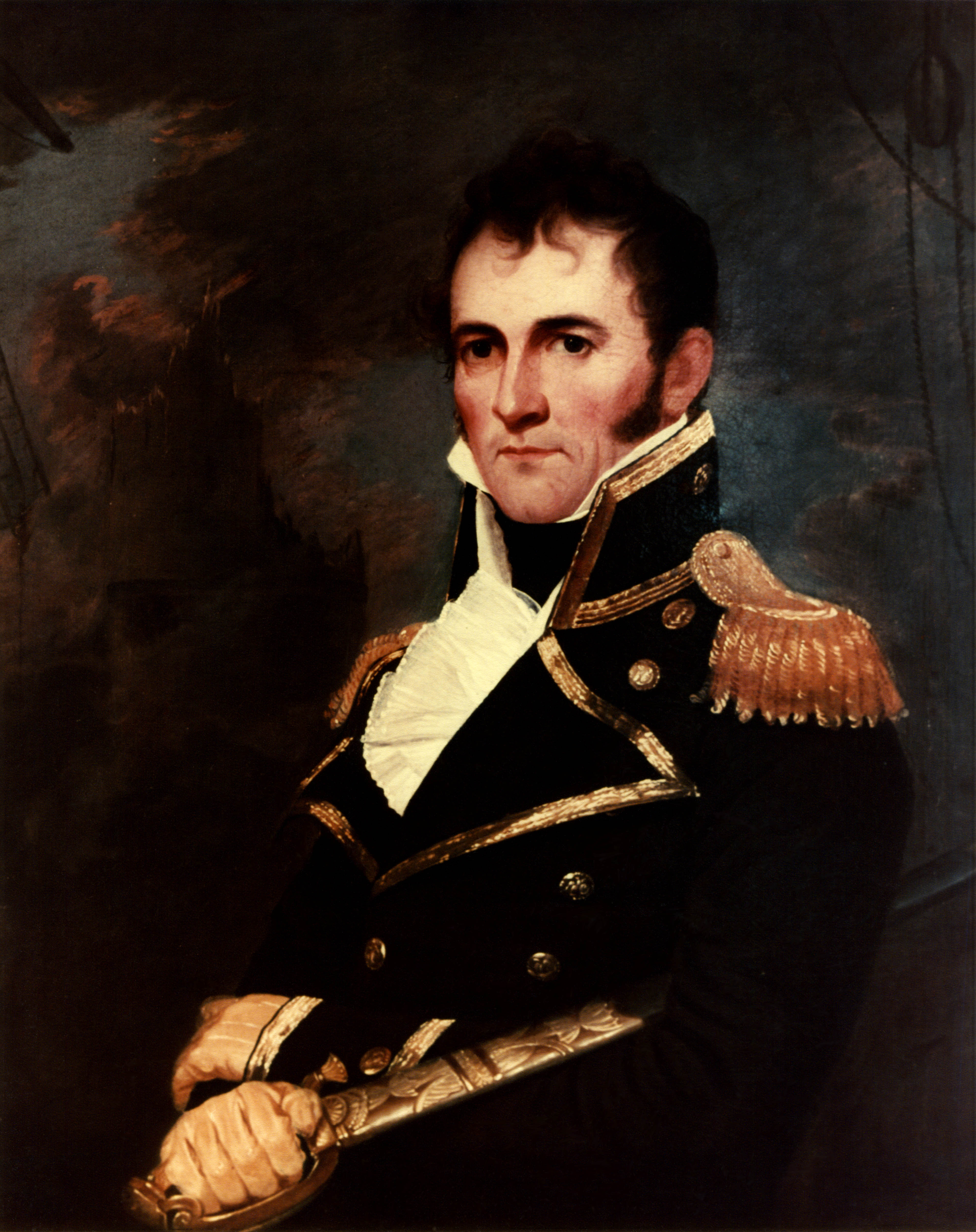
David Porter, Chargé d'Affaires (1831–1839)

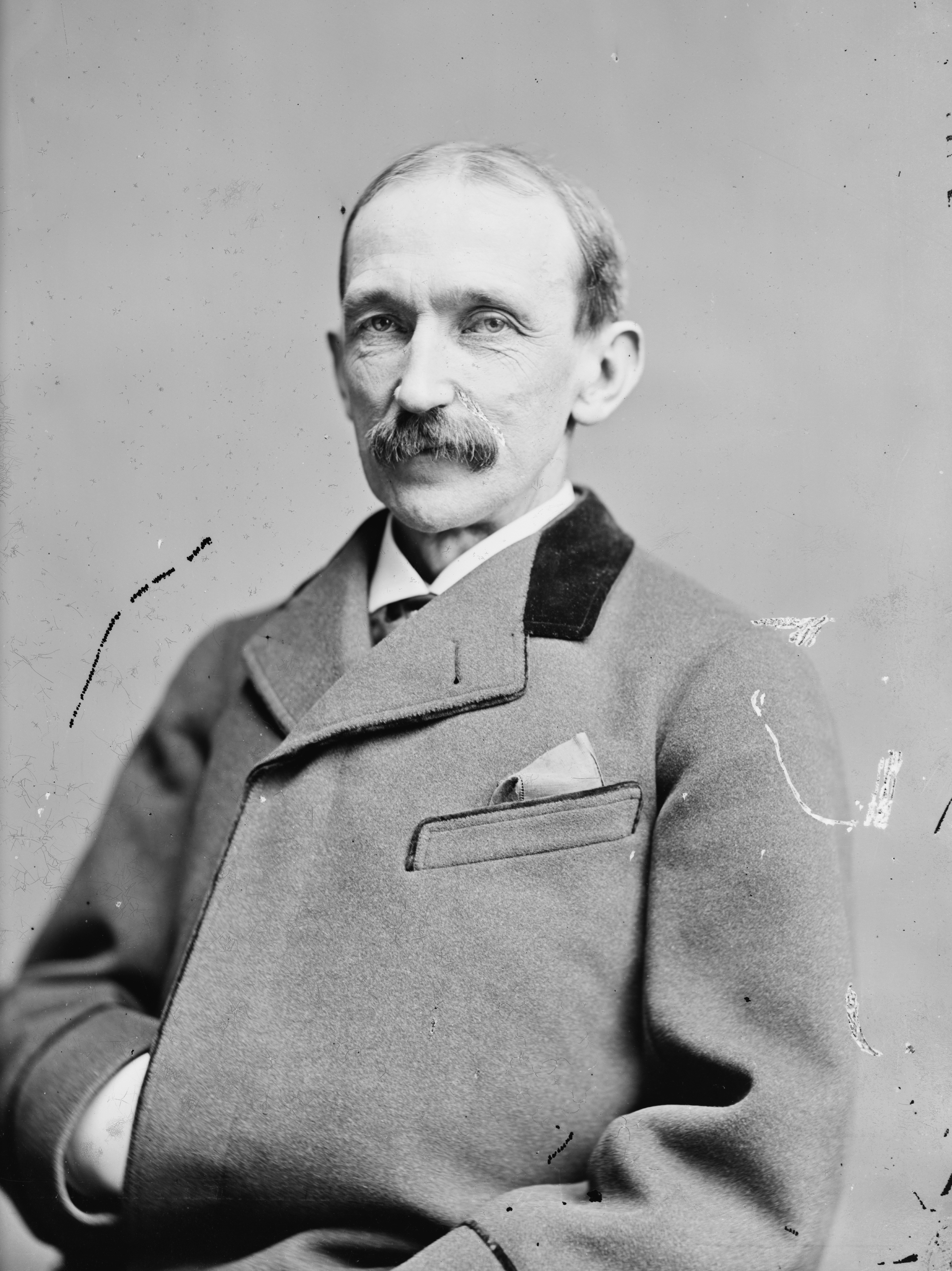
Wayne MacVeagh, Minister Resident (1870–1871)

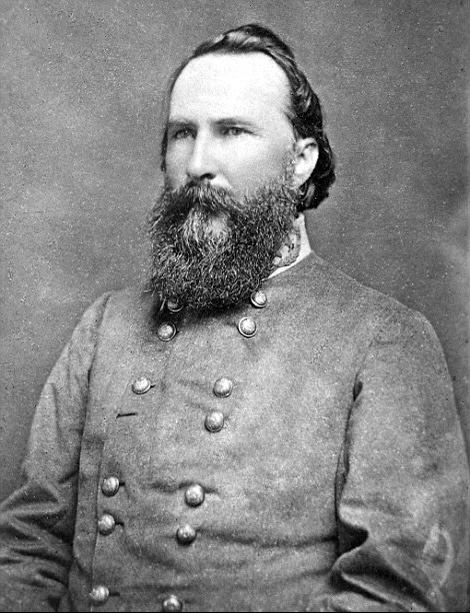
James Longstreet, Minister Resident (1880–1881)

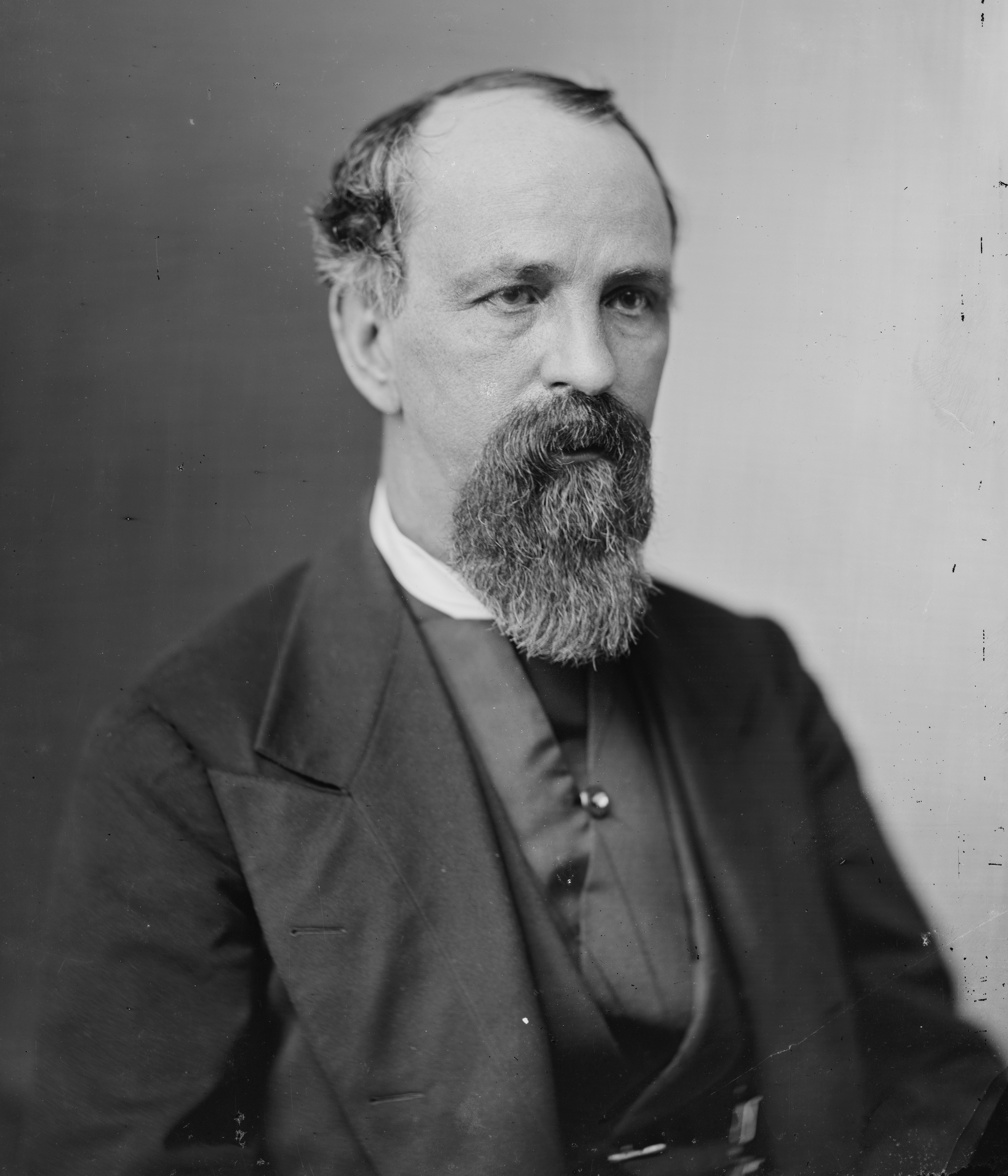
Samuel S. Cox, Envoy Extraordinary and Minister Plenipotentiary (1885–1886)

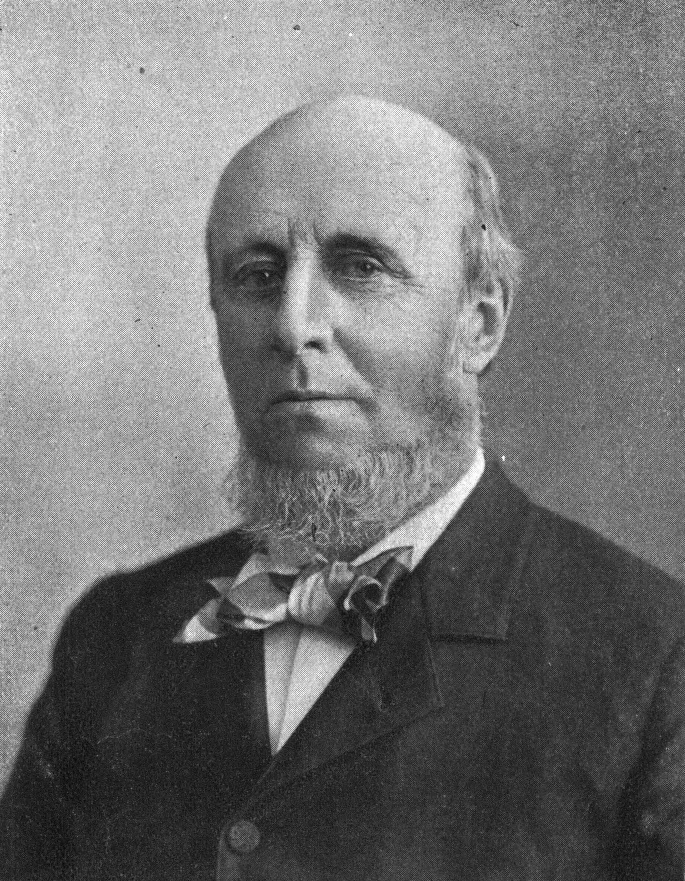
James B. Angell, Envoy Extraordinary and Minister Plenipotentiary (1897–1898)

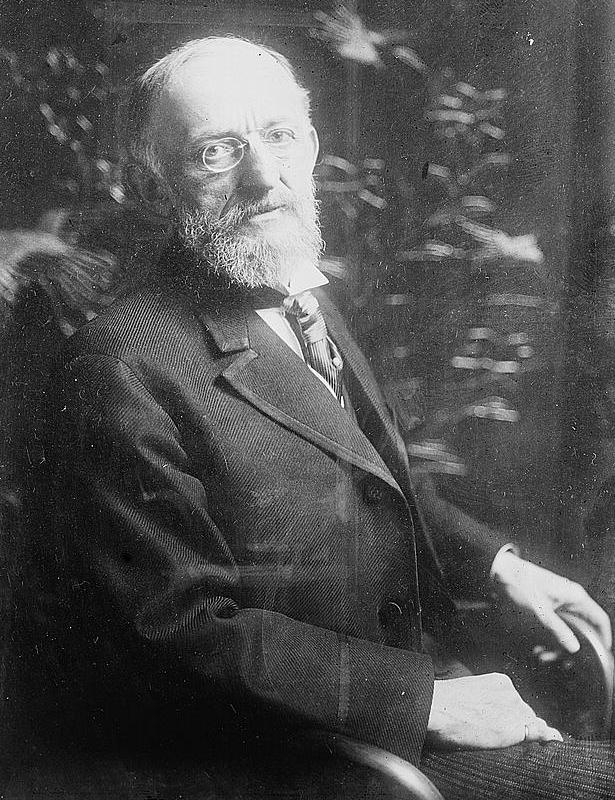
Oscar S. Straus, Ambassador Extraordinary and Plenipotentiary (1909–1910)

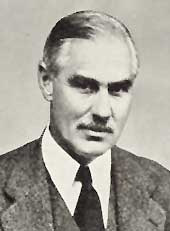
Joseph Grew, Ambassador (1927–1932)

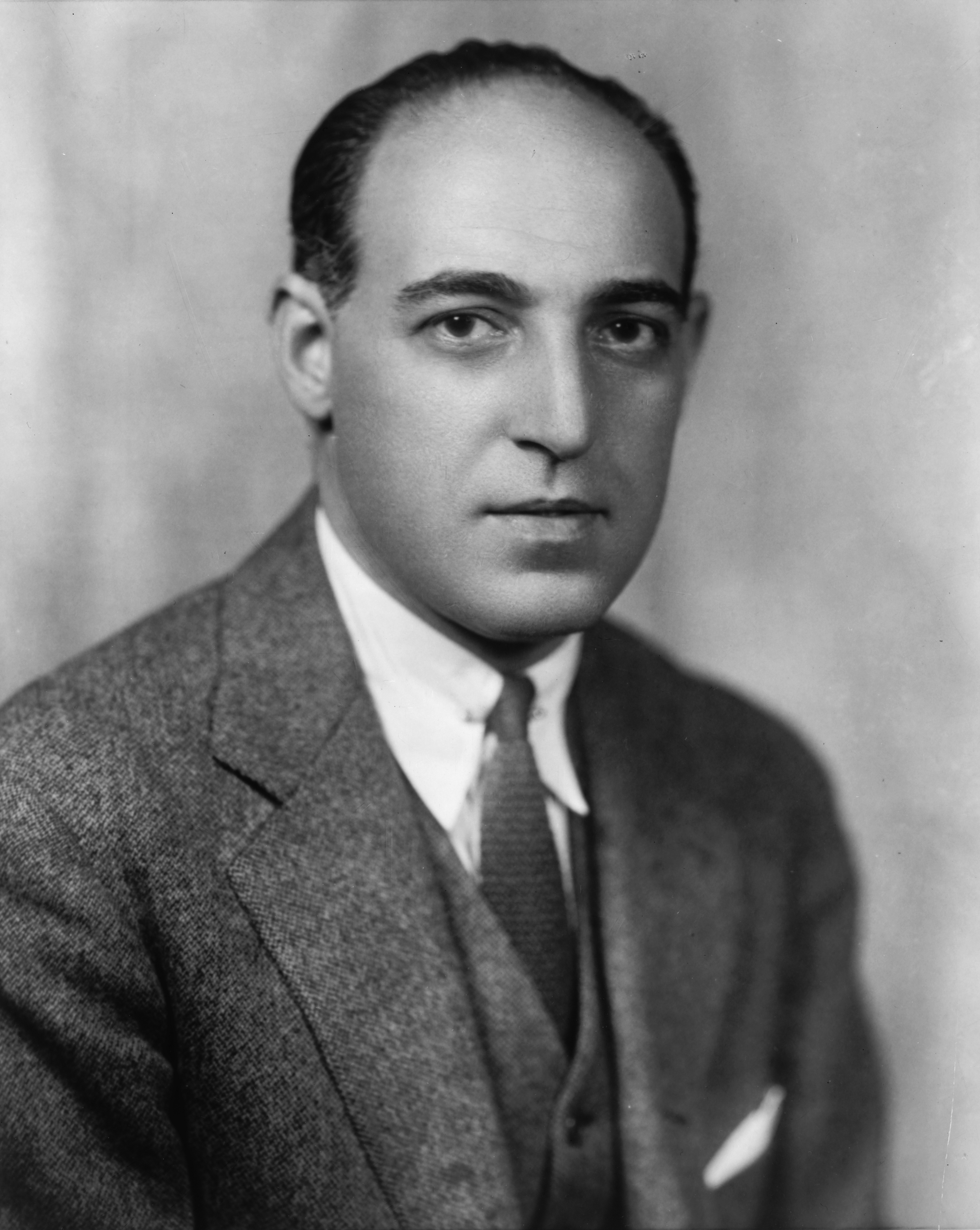
Laurence A. Steinhardt, Ambassador (1941–1945)

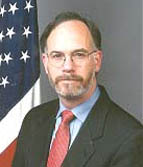
Ross Wilson, Ambassador (2005–2008)

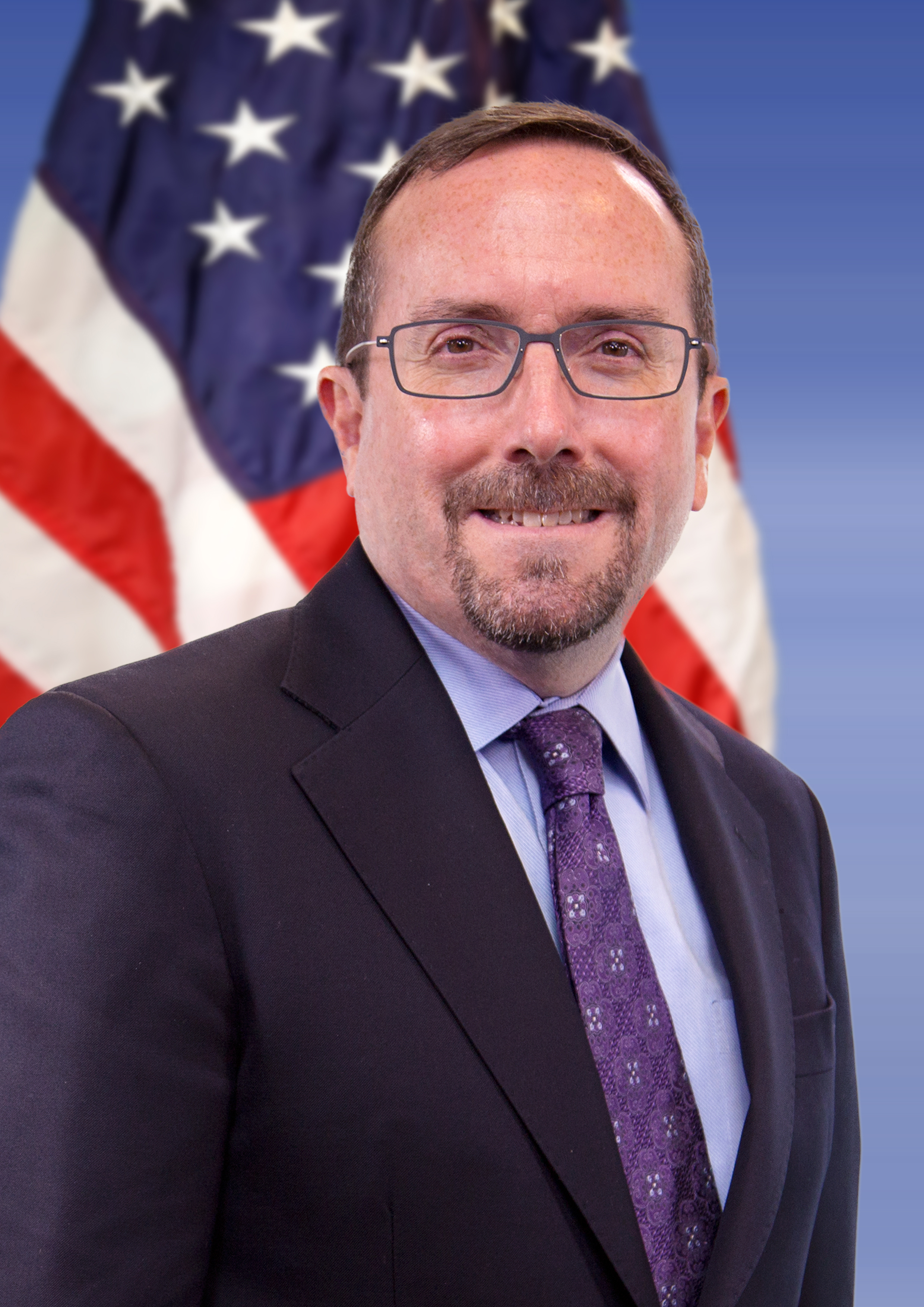
John R. Bass, Ambassador (2014–2017)

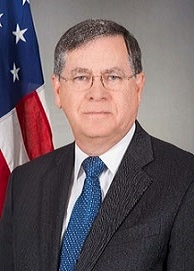
David M. Satterfield, Ambassador (2019–2022)

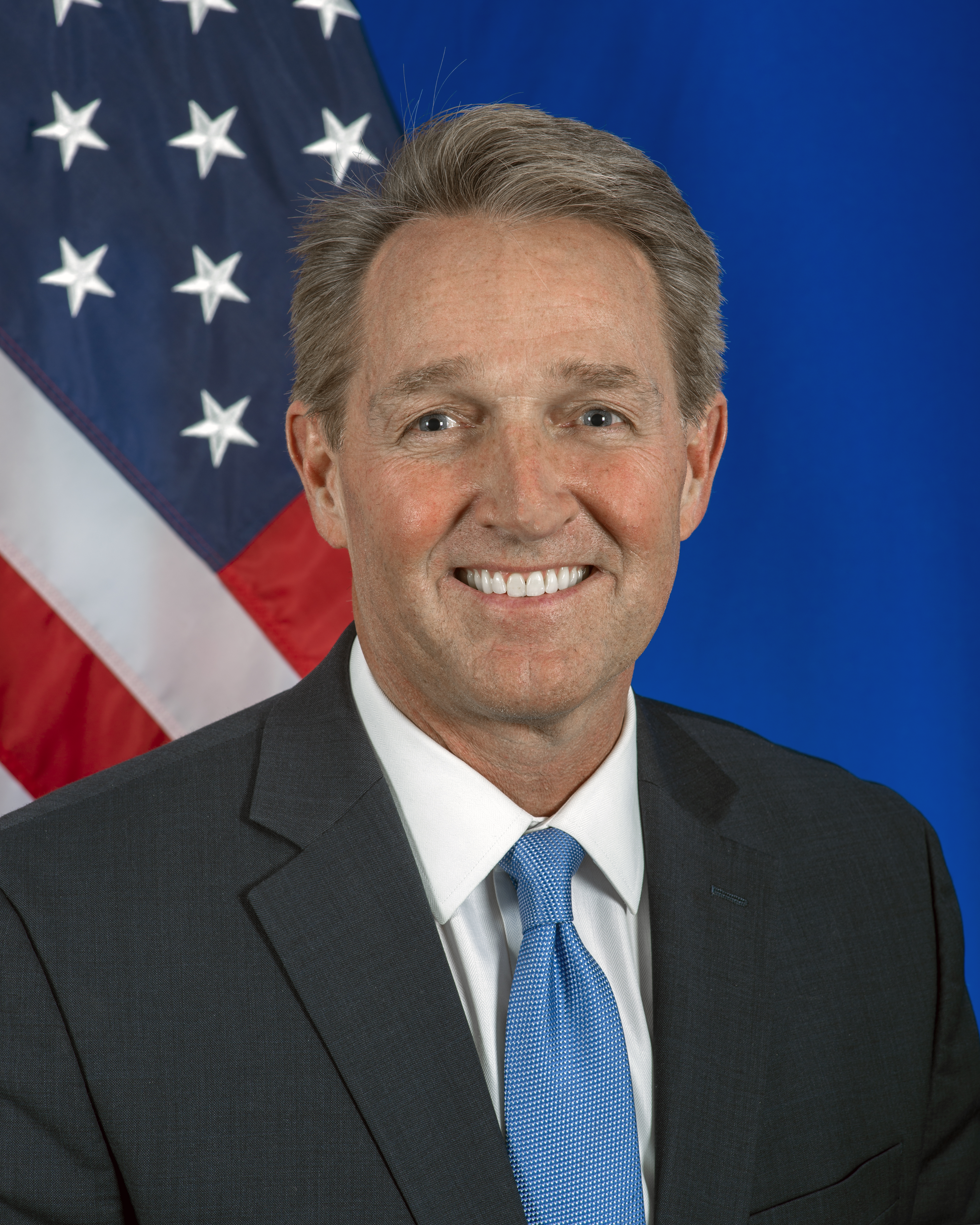
Jeff Flake, Ambassador (2022–2024)

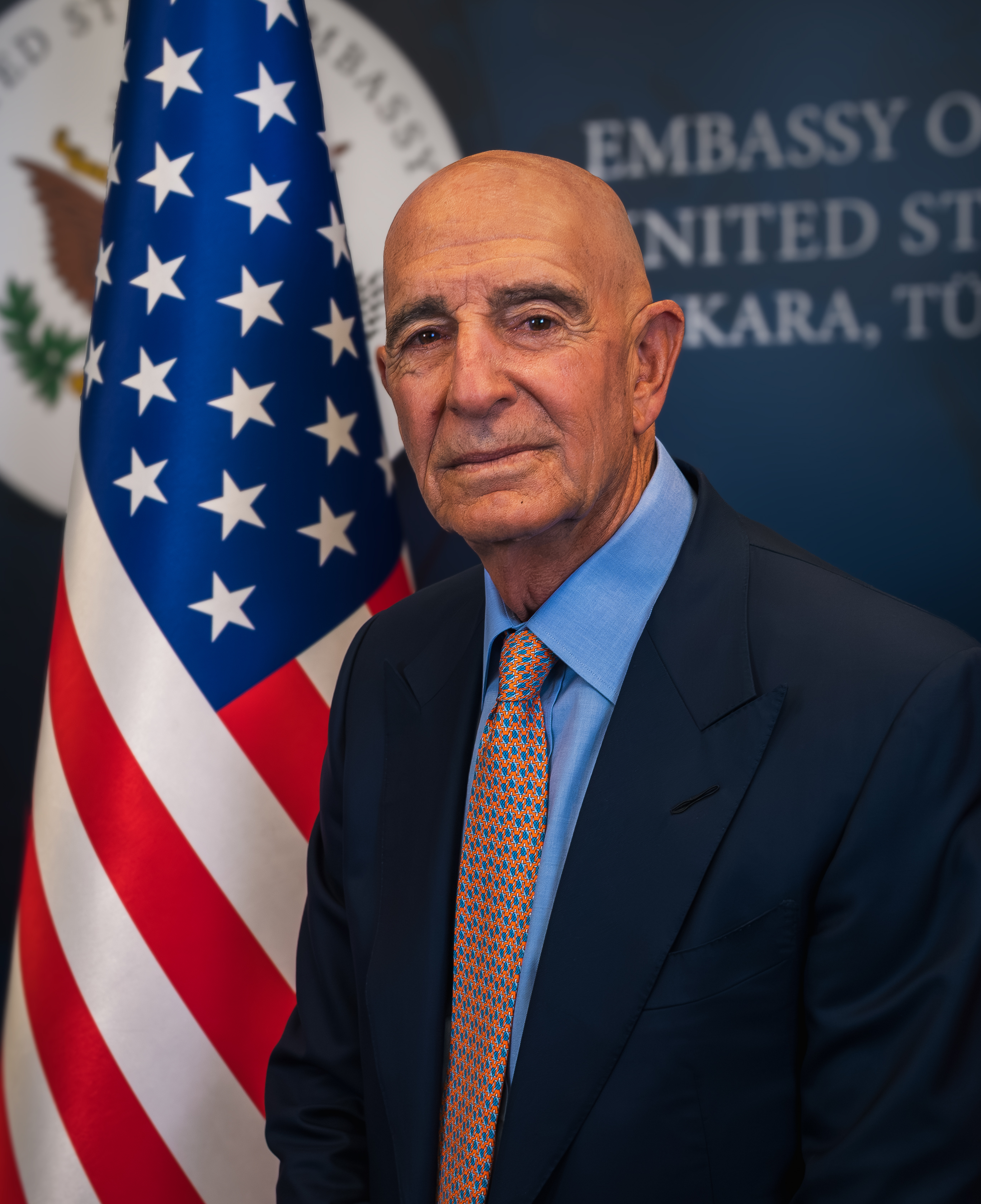
Tom Barrack, Ambassador (2025–)

== See also ==
- Embassy of the United States, Ankara
- Turkey–United States relations
- Ambassadors of the United States
- Embassy of Turkey, Washington D.C.
- Ambassadors of Turkey to the United States
