= Kara McDonald =

American diplomat

Kara C. McDonald
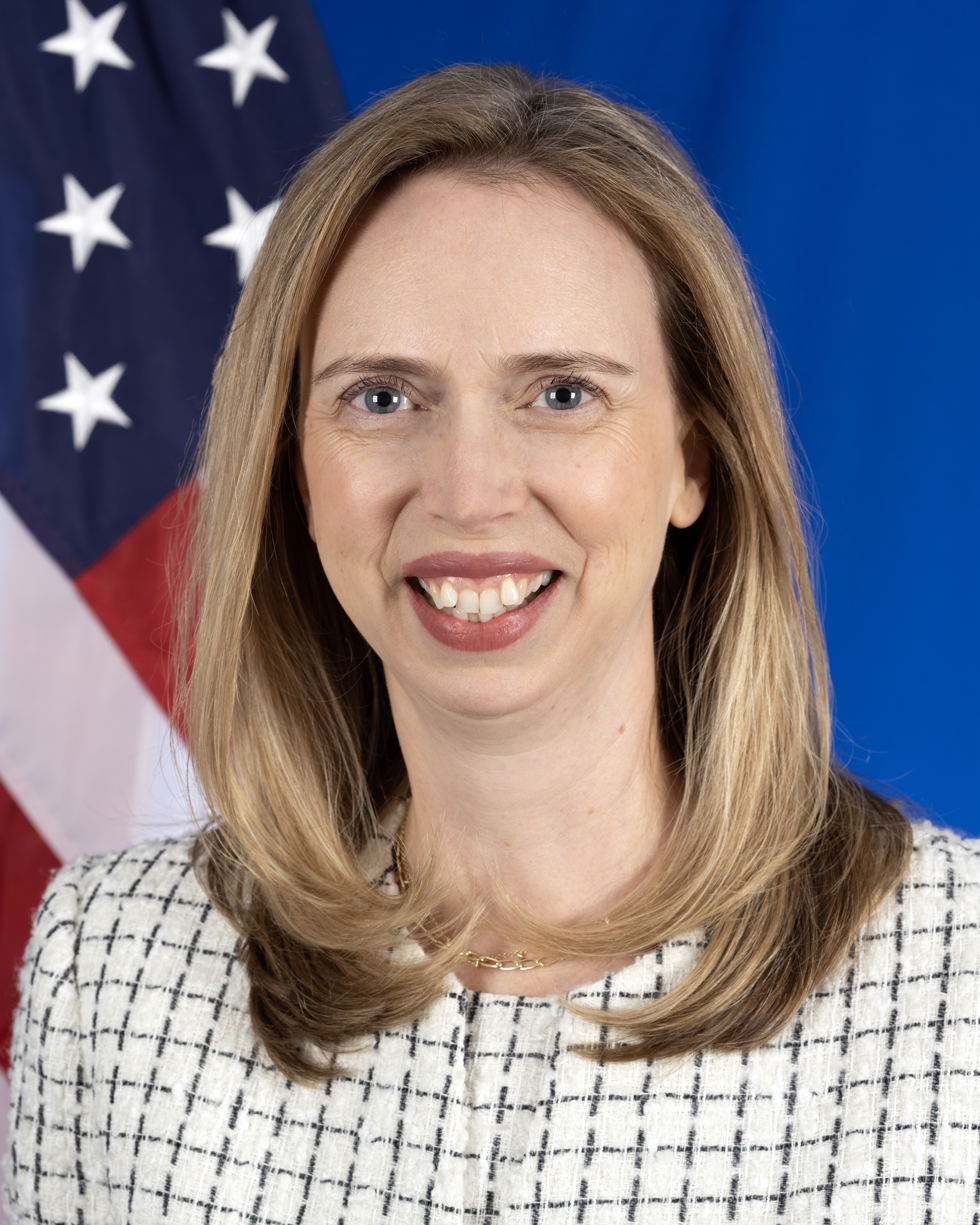

United States Ambassador to Lithuania
- In office January 26, 2024 – November 22, 2026
- President: Joe Biden; Donald Trump
- Preceded by: Robert S. Gilchrist
- Succeeded by: Ryan Campbell

Personal details
- Education: University of Michigan (BA); The Fletcher School at Tufts University (MA)

Kara C. McDonald is an American diplomat currently serving as the United States ambassador to Lithuania. She previously served as the deputy assistant secretary of state for democracy, human rights, and labor from 2020 to 2024.

== Early life and education ==
McDonald was raised in Michigan. She holds a Bachelor of Arts degree in French and comparative literature from the University of Michigan, and a Master of Arts degree from The Fletcher School at Tufts University. She speaks French, Romanian, and Russian.

== Career ==
McDonald is a career member of the Senior Foreign Service. She has served as U.S. Consul General in Strasbourg, deputy permanent observer to the Council of Europe, and deputy chief of mission in Chișinău, Moldova.

Other roles include director in the Bureau of International Narcotics and Law Enforcement Affairs, deputy special coordinator for Haiti, and director for United Nations and International Operations at the National Security Council.

She was also a fellow at the Council on Foreign Relations and held overseas posts in Bucharest and Port-au-Prince. From 2021 to 2022, she served as the senior official to monitor and combat antisemitism, and from 2020 to 2024, as deputy assistant secretary of state for democracy, human rights, and labor.

=== United States ambassador to Lithuania ===
On March 20, 2023, Joe Biden announced his intent to nominate McDonald to serve as the next United States ambassador to Lithuania. On March 21, 2023, her nomination was sent to the Senate. Hearings on her nomination were held before the Senate Foreign Relations Committee on June 21, 2023. The committee favorably reported her nomination on July 13, 2023. On November 29, 2023, her nomination was confirmed in the Senate by voice vote. She presented her credentials to President Gitanas Nausėda on January 26, 2024.

== See also ==
- Ambassadors of the United States

Diplomatic posts
Preceded by Robert S. Gilchrist	United States Ambassador to Lithuania; 2024–present	Incumbent
