= Owen J.C. Norem =

American diplomat and pastor

Owen Joseph Christoffer Norem (May 23, 1902 – October 25, 1981) was a non-career appointee who served as the American Envoy Extraordinary and Minister Plenipotentiary to Lithuania. He presented his credential on November 26, 1937. His mission was terminated when Soviet forces occupied Lithuania on June 15, 1940.

Norem was born in Sioux City, Iowa. He earned a B.A. from St. Olaf College in 1923 and attended the University of Minnesota and Luther Theological Seminary. From 1927 until 1937, he was a pastor. He was the founder of St Andrew's Lutheran Church in West Los Angeles.
