= Mosbacher =

Mosbacher is a surname. Notable people with the surname include:

- Dee Mosbacher (born 1949), American filmmaker and lesbian feminist, daughter of Robert
- Emil Mosbacher (1922–1997), American yachtsman
- Eric Mosbacher (1903–1998), English journalist
- Georgette Mosbacher (born 1947), American businesswoman and Republican fundraiser; former wife of Robert
- Peter Mosbacher (1912–1977), German actor
- Robert Mosbacher (1927–2010), American businessman, United States Secretary of Commerce, yachtsman
- Robert Mosbacher Jr. (born 1951), American businessman and Republican politician; former head of the Overseas Private Investment Corporation; son of Robert
