= Nate Morris =

American businessman (born 1980)

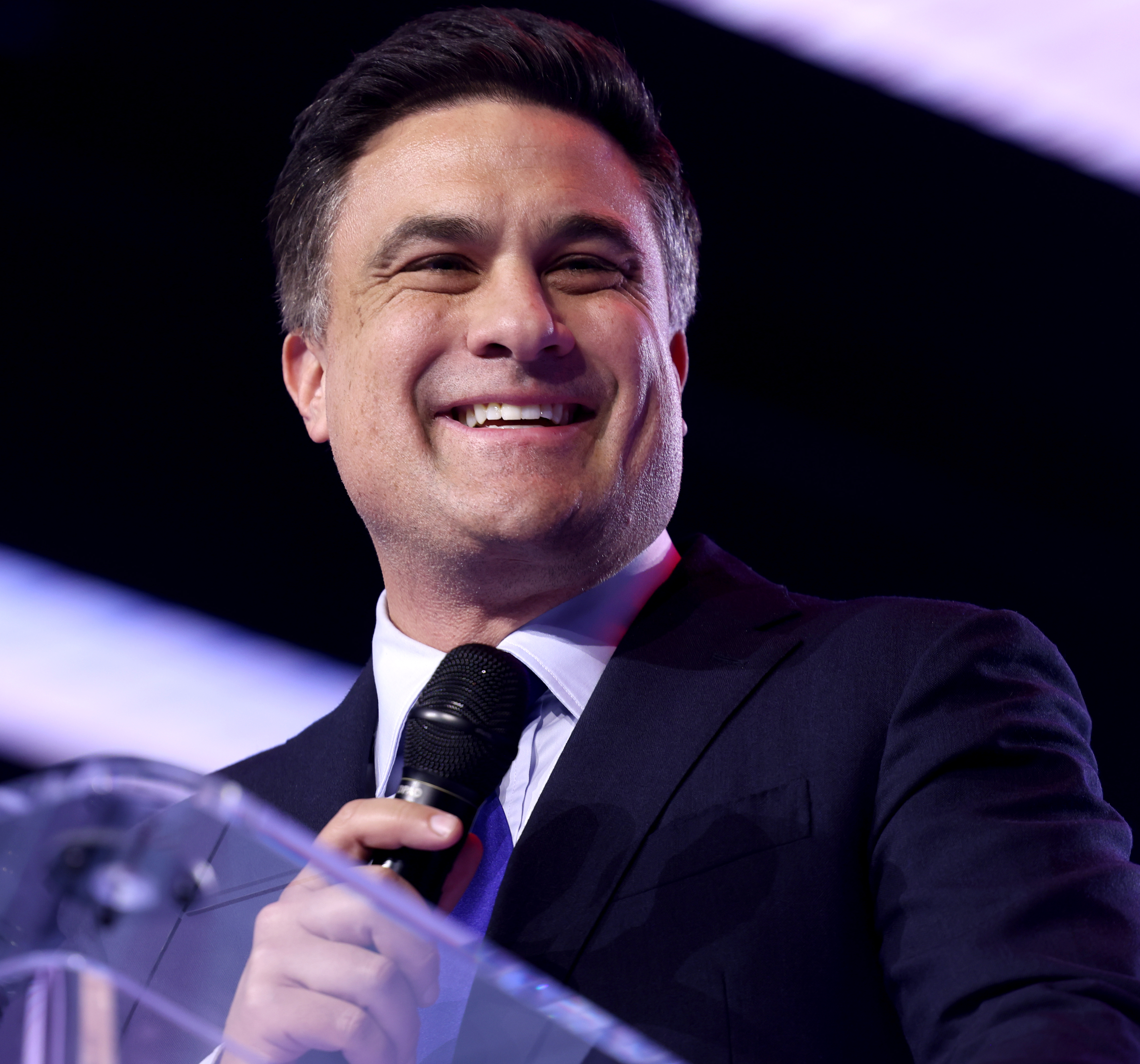
- Morris in 2025

United States Ambassador to Colombia
- Nominee
- Assuming office TBD
- President: Donald Trump
- Succeeding: Hugo Guevara (chargé d'affaires)

Personal details
- Born: Nathaniel Ryan Morris; October 16, 1980 (age 46)
- Party: Republican
- Spouse: Jane Mosbacher (m. 2011)
- Relatives: Robert Mosbacher (grandfather-in-law); Robert Mosbacher Jr. (father-in-law)
- Education: George Washington University (BA); Princeton University (attended); St Hugh's College, Oxford (MBA)
- Website: Campaign website

Nathaniel Ryan Morris (born October 16, 1980) is an American businessman and politician. He is a member of the Republican Party.

Raised in Louisville, he is a ninth-generation Kentuckian with family roots in Appalachia. After attending George Washington University, he later studied at the Princeton School of Public and International Affairs and the University of Oxford's Saïd Business School. In 2008, he founded Rubicon Technologies, a waste management company, which later went public in 2022. He stepped down as CEO later that year but remained chairman, and separately founded Morris Industries, which he continues to lead.

In June 2025, Morris announced his candidacy for the 2026 U.S. Senate election in Kentucky, seeking to succeed retiring incumbent Mitch McConnell, and received backing from Charlie Kirk and Elon Musk. In May 2026, President Donald Trump announced that he had asked Morris to take a role in his administration as an ambassador. He was formally nominated to be the next Ambassador to Colombia the following month.

== Early life and education ==
Originally from Lexington, Kentucky, Morris grew up in Louisville with his single mother and maternal grandparents; his mother worked multiple jobs and relied on food stamps to raise him. A ninth-generation Kentuckian, Morris's family descends from Morgan County, in Appalachia. He was close to his grandfather, Lewis Sexton, who was a former president of the Ford plant United Auto Workers union in Louisville. While attending Eastern High School, Morris reportedly developed political aspirations after multiple spinal fractures derailed his hopes of a football career in the fall of 1996.

Beginning in 1999, Morris attended George Washington University in Washington, D.C. on an academic scholarship, where he studied international affairs, was a member of the Kappa Sigma fraternity, and was elected to Phi Beta Kappa. Morris attended graduate school at the Princeton School of Public and International Affairs. Morris also graduated from the University of Oxford's Said Business School.

== Business career ==
Morris founded Rubicon Technologies, formerly known as Rubicon Global, in 2008 after collaborating with a high school friend, Marc Spiegel. The company is focused on business-to-business and municipal waste and recycling services. Morris attracted several high-profile investors to Rubicon including Bill Ackman, Henry Kravis, Marc Benioff, Paul Tudor Jones, and Goldman Sachs. Kevin Warsh served on Rubicon's advisory board. Morris led Rubicon through a transaction that saw the company go public at a $2 billion valuation in August 2022, listing on the New York Stock Exchange (NYSE) under the ticker symbol RBT. Rubicon was only one of nine Kentucky companies to become public in the 230-year history of the NYSE. The company provided 100% free healthcare for employees. A 2017 Bloomberg article described the company's struggles with its technology and business model, as it attempted to distinguish itself from a traditional waste broker. Rubicon's shares closed at $6 on its first day of trading and later declined into the low $1 range in the months following the listing before rallying to close at $2.27.

Morris stepped down as Rubicon's CEO on October 13, 2022. CTO Phil Rodoni succeeded Morris as CEO. As part of the transition, Morris retained a consulting role, was chairman, and a member of the board of directors.

Morris founded Morris Industries in 2010, where he serves as chairman and CEO, headquartered in Lexington. Morris Industries acquired Republic Financial, an insurance company, in 2024.

== Political and diplomatic career ==
Morris is a Republican and is noted as a political fundraiser. He has worked in a variety of roles for several Kentucky Republicans, including the U.S House of Representatives, the U.S. Senate and the U.S. Department of Labor. Morris has raised funds and made political contributions for U.S. Senator Mitch McConnell. Morris raised over $50,000 for President George W. Bush's 2004 reelection campaign. Morris traveled with U.S. Senator Rand Paul to Israel in 2013 and raised money for his Senate and presidential campaigns, becoming one of his top fund-raisers. Paul wrote about Morris in his 2015 book, Taking a Stand: Moving Beyond Partisan Politics to Unite America. Morris is a political ally of U.S. Vice President JD Vance and was among the biggest donors in Kentucky to Donald Trump's 2024 presidential campaign.

=== 2026 U.S. Senate campaign ===
In early 2025, Morris expressed an interest in possibly running for U.S. Senate or governor in Kentucky. In February 2025, Morris criticized Kentucky Senator Mitch McConnell for voting against confirming Tulsi Gabbard and Pete Hegseth to Trump's cabinet. Later that month, Donald Trump Jr. expressed support for Morris's public criticism of McConnell. In March 2025, Time reported that Vice President JD Vance had encouraged Morris to run for the U.S. Senate in Kentucky.

In June 2025, Morris announced that he would make a bid for the U.S. Senate on a podcast with Donald Trump Jr., and was endorsed by Charlie Kirk of Turning Point Action at an event in Shepherdsville. Morris was also endorsed by U.S. Senators Jim Banks and Bernie Moreno, businessmen Vivek Ramaswamy and Richard Uihlein, and political commentators Benny Johnson and Austin Wade Petersen.

In August 2025, Morris appeared at a political event at Fancy Farm with fellow GOP primary candidates for McConnell's Senate seat, Andy Barr and Daniel Cameron. While all three candidates had served as interns for McConnell, Morris was the most critical of his former mentor, calling him a "decrepit old mob boss" and pledging to "trash Mitch McConnell's legacy". The same month, former White House spokesman Sean Spicer commented that Morris had "the entire MAGA infrastructure behind him." In December 2025, Morris filed his paperwork in Frankfort with the Kentucky secretary of state, formally launching his campaign for the 2026 election.

In January 2026, Elon Musk made a $10 million donation to the pro-Morris Fight for Kentucky super PAC, the largest single contribution Musk has given to a U.S. Senate candidate. In March 2026, Morris was endorsed by the Conservative Political Action Conference.

In May 2026, Donald Trump announced that he had asked Morris to take a role in his administration as an ambassador. Morris endorsed Andy Barr and withdrew from the Senate race.

Following public criticisms by President Trump over Senator Rand Paul's breaks with Trump-backed legislation, several outlets have reported that Trump or his allies might support a 2028 Republican primary challenge to Paul. Morris has been reported to be a potential primary challenger to Paul.

=== Ambassador nomination ===
In June 2026, Morris was nominated by President Trump to be U.S. Ambassador to Colombia. Morris' confirmation hearing before the U.S. Senate Committee on Foreign Relations took place on August 5, 2026. On November 18, 2026, Morris' confirmation was approved by a vote of the committee, pending approval by a full vote of the U.S. Senate.

== Personal life ==
Morris married Jane Mosbacher on New Year's Eve 2011. She is the daughter of Robert Mosbacher Jr., the head of the Overseas Private Investment Corporation under George W. Bush, and granddaughter of George H. W. Bush's commerce secretary Robert Mosbacher Sr. Morris is a Christian and spoke at Clays Mill Baptist Church after the assassination of Charlie Kirk about his relationship with Kirk.

Morris is a trustee of the Morris Foundation, which provides college scholarships in Kentucky.

Morris is a member of the Council on Foreign Relations and the National Society of Sons of the American Revolution.

Morris was awarded an honorary Doctor of Humane Letters degree from the University of Pikeville in 2021.
