= Zwolnieni z Teorii =

Polish internet educational platform

- Fundacja Zwolnieni z Teorii
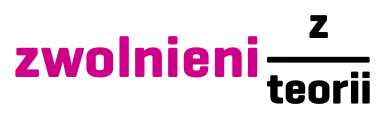
- Abbreviation: ZWZT
- Formation: 2013; 13 years ago
- Type: Non-profit public foundation
- Purpose: Education, Ending social injustice
- Headquarters: Warsaw, Poland
- Region served: Poland
- Method: Donations, Grants, Social Project Method
- Co-Chair: Paula Bruszewska; Marcin Bruszewski; Rafał Flis
- Employees: ~50 (2019)
- Volunteers: ~250 (2019)
- Website: zwolnienizteorii.pl
- Formerly called: Fundacja Choćby Razem Dla Wspólnej Przyszłości

Zwolnieni z Teorii is an internet platform created by Zwolnieni z Teorii Foundation (aka. ZWZT), the largest educational foundation in Poland. In recognition for the foundation's activities in Poland, Forbes placed the platform on the Forbes 30 Under 30 Europe in 2016 and on the Forbes 30 Under 30 Poland in 2018.

== Genesis ==
Zwolnieni z Teorii was established in 2013 as a response to growing problem of lack of competence of young people entering job market. Programme aims to help youth overcome problems with finding a first job. As its goal, (Note: Polish law requires that any established non-profit organisation must choose a charitable activity (pol. działalność pożytku publicznego)) the foundation established limiting the entry barriers for the young people when they graduate from school and want to enter the job market. Research proves that employers indicate that the missing and desired skills are, among others teamwork or effective communication. While participating in the program, participants are required to train these skills, planning and executing their own ideas as social projects. Projects done within a programme must focus on helping others and participants are encouraged to act for the benefits of others. This is done to address the low civic participation rate of Polish society, as an EU Eurobarometer survey from 2011 shows that only 16% of Poles aged 15–30 are active volunteers.

== Formula ==
=== Students ===
Zwolnieni z Teorii cooperated with Project Management Institute and created a platform that grants its users access to practical information in the field of project management and related activities that enable effective action to solve the selected social problem. During the school year, young people find the social problem they want to solve or raise awareness to and a mentor appointed by the foundation helps them successfully execute their project.

The goal behind the platform is to teach its users project management and other skills that may help them succeed in the future. After the completion of the project implemented, participants obtain international business certificates, signed, among others by The Coca-Cola Company, Google or Y Combinator.

Since the inception of the programme, more than 60,000 people took part in it and their actions reached over 40 million beneficiaries (8 million in 2019 alone).

=== Teachers ===
In 2018, the foundation with cooperation from Google launched a programme aimed to the polish teachers with the aim to promote self-improvement and specialization among the polish teachers.

As part of the programme, its members are able to benefit from the support of business experts, materials for lessons or training. Since September 2019 the beneficiaries also have access to educational platform created by Google.org. This program has generated

During the 2019 polish national teachers strike, the board of the foundation donated 108 000 PLN (Note: equivalent of 29 000 USD) to the strike fund as a gesture of support toward the striking teachers. This move has generated significant interest of the mainstream polish media.

=== Schools ===
Since 2017, foundation runs the Ranking Szkół Kompetencji Przyszłości. (Note: (eng. Future Competence School Ranking)) Ranking, prepared in cooperation with Rzeczpospolita, one of Poland's biggest newspapers, features Lyceums and Technikums whose students helped the most beneficiaries in the last school year. In 2019 more than 100 schools all around Poland were awarded for their readiness to help student execute their own social project. Top 30 Headmasters were invited to take part in the 5th edition of the Grand Finale to receive their awards from the hands of US Ambassador to Poland - HE Georgette Mosbacher.

== Grand Finale ==
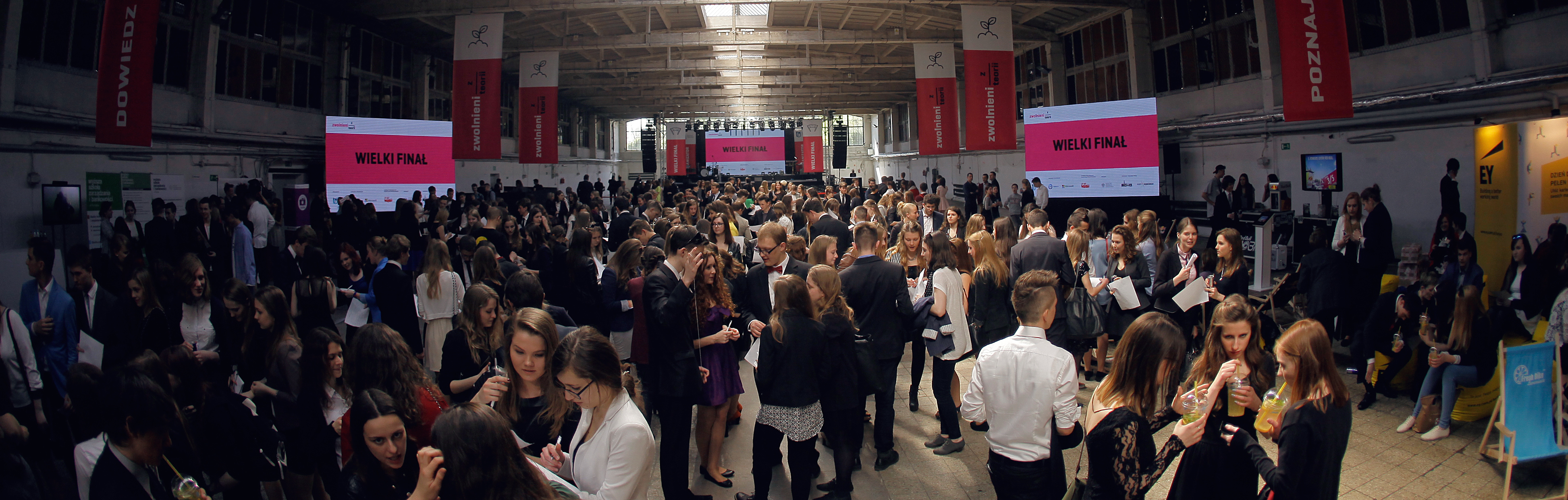
2015 Grand Finale

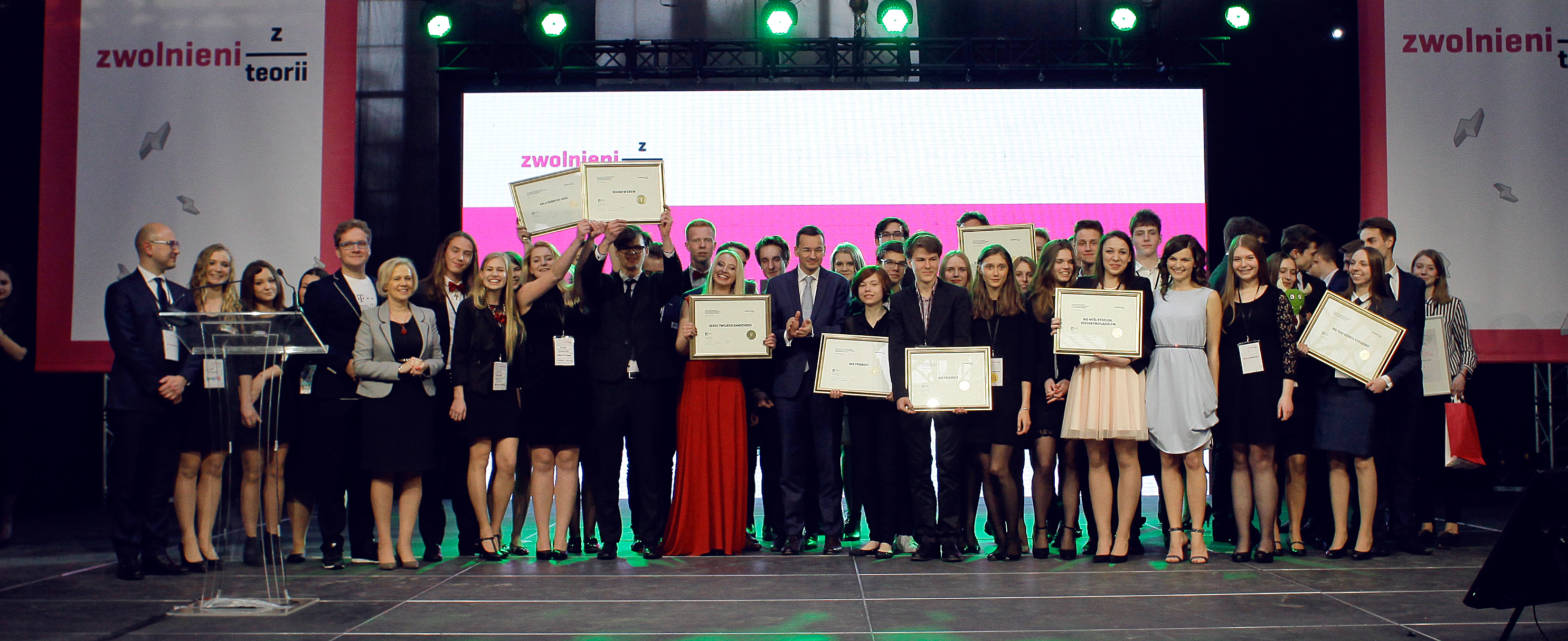
2016 Grand Finale with Prime Minister of Poland Mateusz Morawiecki (in the middle)

Grand Finale	Year	Location	Date	Master of the ceremony	Projects	Finalists
I	2014 / 2015	Warsaw	23 April 2015	Bronisław Komorowski (Note: then-President of Poland)	213	1 443
II	2015 / 2016	Warsaw	23 April 2016	Mateusz Morawiecki (Note: then-Deputy Prime Minister of Poland and Minister of Finance)	496	2 316
III	2016 / 2017	Warsaw	20 June 2017	Jarosław Gowin (Note: then-Deputy Prime Minister of the Republic of Poland and Minister of Science and Higher Education)	850	4 781
IV	2017 / 2018	Warsaw	20 June 2018	Jarosław Gowin	1 240	6 230
V	2018 / 2019	Warsaw	24 April 2019	Georgette Mosbacher (Note: then-United States Ambassador to Poland)	~ 1 600	~ 15 000

== Awards ==
Foundations received several awards for introducing an innovative method of education to the young people of Poland. Their Social Project Method is a combination of Massive open online course and Project Management Institute guidelines. For introducing this method to hundreds of thousands young people they were recognised by MIT Technology Review as Social Innovator of the Year in 2016. Since 2016 the foundation has a representative on the jury of the Effie Awards Poland. Between 2015 and 2019 Forbes placed the foundation on the Forbes 30 Under 30 Europe and on the Forbes 30 Under 30 Poland.
