= Cathy Hudgins =

American politician (1944–2025)

Catherine M. Hudgins

Member of the Fairfax County, Virginia Board of Supervisors from the Hunter Mill district
- In office 2000–2019
- Preceded by: Robert B. Dix, Jr.
- Succeeded by: Walter L. Alcorn

Personal details
- Born: Catherine Agnes Martin; February 27, 1944 Pine Bluff, Arkansas, U.S.
- Died: May 24, 2025 (aged 81)
- Party: Democratic
- Spouse: Willie L. Hudgins
- Education: University of Arkansas (B.S.); George Mason University (M.P.A.)
- Occupation: Programmer, Politician
- Website: www.cathyhudgins.com

Catherine Agnes Martin Hudgins (February 27, 1944 – May 24, 2025) was an American politician who served as a member of the Board of Supervisors for Fairfax County, Virginia, from 1999 to 2019, representing the Hunter Mill district, which includes Reston and Vienna. She was a member of the Democratic Party and was the first African American and the first person of color elected to the Board of Supervisors.

== Political career ==
Hudgins served as a Virginia national committeewoman on the Democratic National Committee for two terms starting in 1984. She supported Jesse Jackson for president in the 1988 primaries. In 1993, Hudgins was selected as Secretary of the Fairfax County Electoral Board, where she served until 1994. In 1995, she became Chief of Staff for Board of Supervisors Chair Katherine Hanley.

Hudgins was elected to the Board of Supervisors in November 1999 in an upset. She defeated incumbent Republican supervisor Robert B. Dix, Jr. Dix's share of the vote was split by an independent conservative candidate, John Thoburn, the owner of several Christian private schools and longtime opponent of the Supervisor.

In 2003, Hudgins faced Republican J.D. "Doug" Bushee and defeated him 63%–36%.

In 2007, Hudgins faced no major party opponents and defeated three independent candidates, including Marie T. Huhtala, a retired career foreign service officer who had previously served as Ambassador to Malaysia from 2001 to 2004. Michael Williams was also an independent, but later ran for office as a Republican and served in county Republican leader. Geraldine A. Butkus appeared on the ballot as an independent but was affiliated with the Independent Green Party. In that year's campaign, the major issue was development in the Hunter Mill district, including the construction of high-density residences.

In her last two campaigns for reelection, Hudgins was unopposed. In January 2019, she announced she would not run again in that fall's county election. She was succeeded by fellow Democrat Walter L. Alcorn.

== Personal life ==
Born in Pine Bluff, Arkansas in 1944, Hudgins was married to Willie L. Hudgins, Jr. for 48 years. In 1969, the Hudgins family moved to Reston, becoming some of the first residents of the planned community. Hudgins worked for twelve years in the private sector for AT&T as a programmer, consultant, and analyst. Willie Hudgins was a lawyer who was at one time section chief and chief litigator for the Antitrust Division of the Department of Justice and later joined Kelley Drye & Warren. In April 2013, Cathy Hudgins was diagnosed with noninvasive breast cancer. She died on May 24, 2025, at the age of 81.

== Electoral history ==
Election results of Cathy Hudgins
Year	Office	Election	Party	Votes	%	Opponent	Party	Votes	%	Opponent	Party	Votes	%	Opponent	Party	Votes	%
1999	Fairfax County Board of Supervisors	General	D	12,599	52.36%	Robert B. Dix, Jr.	R	10,536	43.78%	John M. Thoburn	I	929	3.86%				
2003	Fairfax County Board of Supervisors	General	D	14,831	63.24%	J.D. "Doug" Bushee	R	8,620	36.76%								
2007	Fairfax County Board of Supervisors	General	D	12,807	57.23%	Marie T. Huhtala	I	5,044	22.54%	Mike J. "Spike" Williams	I	3,665	16.38%	Geraldine A. Butkus	I	864	3.86%
2011	Fairfax County Board of Supervisors	General	D	18,506	100.00%												
2015	Fairfax County Board of Supervisors	General	D	17,242	100.00%												
