= Homer Byington =

Homer Byington may refer to:

- A. Homer Byington, American diplomat, politician, newspaper publisher and editor
- Homer M. Byington Jr., American ambassador
