= Robert Mosbacher Jr. =

American businessman

Robert Mosbacher
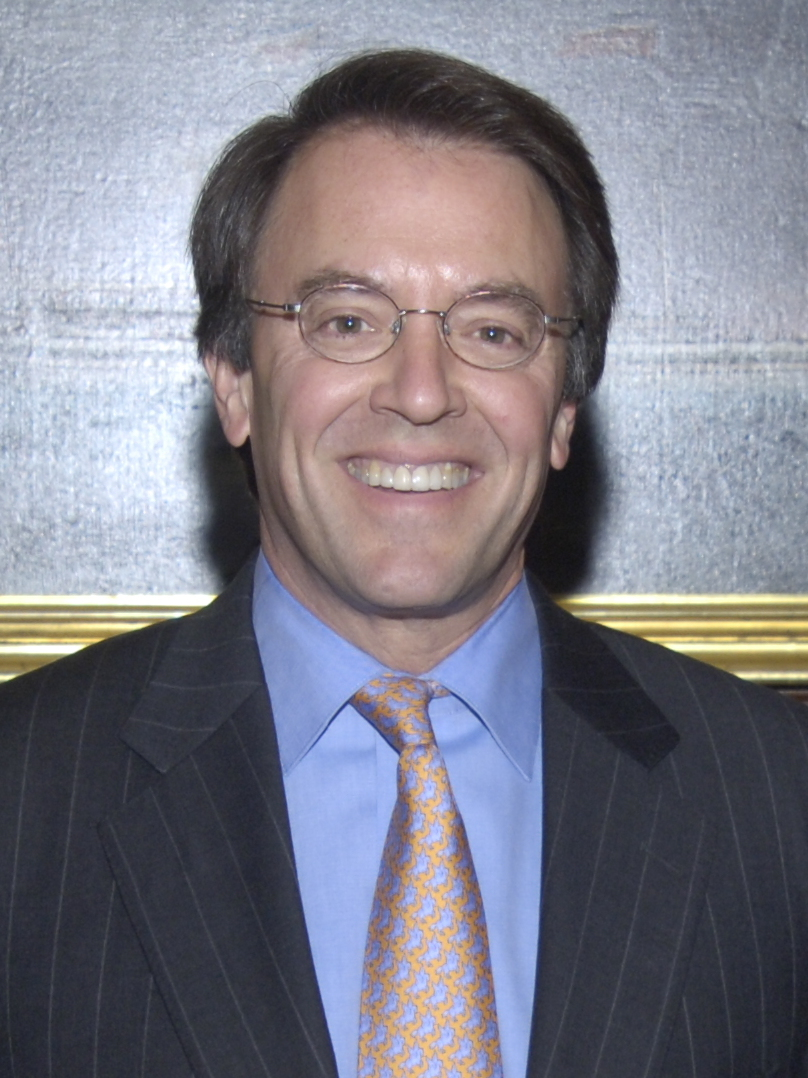
- Mosbacher in 2006

President and CEO of the Overseas Private Investment Corporation
- In office 2005–2009
- President: George W. Bush
- Preceded by: Peter Watson
- Succeeded by: Lawrence Spinelli

Personal details
- Born: Robert Adam Mosbacher Jr. May 29, 1951 (age 74)
- Party: Republican
- Children: 3
- Parent: Robert Mosbacher (father)
- Relatives: Dee Mosbacher (sister); Emil Mosbacher (uncle); Nate Morris (son-in-law)
- Education: Georgetown University (BA); Southern Methodist University (JD)

Robert Adam Mosbacher Jr. (born May 29, 1951) is an American businessman, founder of BizCorps, and the former head of the Overseas Private Investment Corporation (OPIC). Nominated by U.S. President George W. Bush, Mosbacher was sworn in as the ninth president and chief executive officer of OPIC in October 2005.

His father, Robert Mosbacher Sr., was the 28th Secretary of Commerce. His uncle was Emil Mosbacher, a two-time America's Cup Winner and former Chief of Protocol for President Richard Nixon.

== Career ==
Mosbacher is currently Chairman of Mosbacher Energy Company (MEC), an independent oil and gas exploration and production company in Houston, Texas. From 1986 to 2005, Mosbacher was president and CEO. He was also vice chairman of Mosbacher Power Group, an independent electric power developer which operated from 1995 and was acquired in 2003.

Mosbacher has served on numerous boards of various organizations and charities.

Earlier in his career, Mosbacher worked for U.S. Senator Howard Baker for over seven years. Mosbacher was appointed by President Reagan to three successive Presidential Task Forces on Private Sector Initiatives during the 1980s. He is a member of the Council on Foreign Relations.

=== Mosbacher Institute ===
Mosbacher is involved in the Mosbacher Institute for Trade, Economics, and Public Policy, which was founded in October 2009 upon the request of President George H.W. Bush to honor his father Robert Mosbacher Sr., who served as secretary of commerce from 1989 to 1992.

=== Texas Republican candidate ===
Mosbacher ran unsuccessfully in the 1997 Houston mayoral election, losing to Lee Brown, a Democrat, in a nonpartisan election. He received 48 percent of the vote in the runoff election. Mosbacher faced controversy in the campaign, as he had lived outside Houston in West University Place for eleven years and professed interest in federal and state issues, rather than local concerns.

He also ran unsuccessfully for the Republican nomination for the U.S. Senate in 1984, losing to Phil Gramm, and Lieutenant Governor of Texas in 1990, losing to Democrat Bob Bullock by a total of 52% to 45%.

== Author ==
In 1993, he wrote the book Deep In The Heart: A Remedy For An Ailing Texas.

== Karl Rove incident ==
In a notable event, Karl Rove was fired from the 1992 Bush campaign for planting a negative story about Mosbacher with the columnist Robert Novak.

== Personal life ==
Mosbacher Jr. is the son of Robert Mosbacher (1927–2010) and Jane Pennybacker, who died of cancer in 1970. In 1977, he received his J.D. degree from the Southern Methodist University Dedman School of Law in Dallas. In 1973, he obtained his bachelor's degree from Georgetown University.

Party political offices
Preceded by David Davidson	Republican nominee for Lieutenant Governor of Texas; 1990	Succeeded by Tex Lezar
