= Marion Hartzog Smoak =

American politician (1916–2020)

16th Chief of Protocol of the United States
- In office July 1, 1972 – March 30, 1974
- President: Richard Nixon
- Preceded by: Emil Mosbacher
- Succeeded by: Henry E. Catto Jr.

Member of the South Carolina Senate from the 23rd district
- In office 1967–1968

Personal details
- Born: July 8, 1916 Aiken, South Carolina, U.S.
- Died: May 4, 2020 (aged 103) Palm Beach, Florida, U.S.
- Party: Republican
- Spouse: Mary Frances Meister
- Children: 3
- Education: The Citadel (BA); University of South Carolina (LLB)

Military service
- Branch/service: United States Army
- Battles/wars: World War II

Marion Hartzog Smoak (July 8, 1916 – May 4, 2020) was an American attorney and politician who served as Chief of Protocol of the United States under President Richard Nixon from 1972 to 1974. Smoak previously served as a member of the South Carolina Senate and was a member of Ronald Reagan's presidential campaign staff and transition team in 1980.

== Early life and education ==
A native of Aiken, South Carolina, Smoak received a bachelor's degree in English and history from The Citadel in 1938 and a law degree from the University of South Carolina in 1941.

=== Military service ===
Commissioned into the United States Army, Smoak served in the Judge Advocate General's Corps in both the Pacific and European Theaters during World War II, then taught military law at the United States Military Academy. From 1948 to 1952 he was assigned to the Judge Advocate General's Office of the U.S. Occupation Forces in Japan, where his duties included overseeing war crimes trials of Japanese military members; this was followed by tours with the 82d Airborne Division at Fort Bragg, North Carolina, and the 101st Airborne Division at Fort Campbell, Kentucky, during which he qualified for the Master Parachutist Badge by making 58 jumps.

Smoak next served in the International Affairs Division of the Army Staff Judge Advocate's Office at the Pentagon and also as a Legislative Affairs Officer supporting the United States Congress, United States Department of Justice and the United States Department of State; he retired in 1961 with the rank of lieutenant colonel.

== Career ==
After a stint in a private law practice in Aiken County, South Carolina, in 1964 Smoak ran for the South Carolina Senate, losing by less than 1% of the vote; elected on his second try in 1966, he became one of the first five Republicans to serve in that body since Reconstruction. Smoak served on several committees, including Agriculture, Atomic Energy, Veterans Affairs, and the State Constitutional Revision Committee.

In March 1970, Smoak was appointed Deputy Chief of Protocol at the United States Department of State. He was named Acting Chief in June 1972 and given the rank of Ambassador in September 1972. He was confirmed as Chief in 1974.

During his tenure, he oversaw several major events, including the state funerals of Presidents Dwight D. Eisenhower, Harry S. Truman and Lyndon B. Johnson, and state visits by Soviet Premier Leonid Brezhnev and Prince Charles.

In 1980, Smoak was named co-chairman of the Committee on Finance for Ronald Reagan's presidential campaign, then served on Reagan's State Department transition team. He subsequently returned to private law practice at the Washington, D.C. firm of Shipley, Smoak and Henry.

== Personal life ==
Smoak was married to Mary Frances Meister Smoak (1920–2015) for 56 years. They had three children, five grandchildren, and three great-grandchildren. At age 102, he maintained homes in Washington, D.C. and Palm Beach, Florida. As of May 2019, he was the oldest living graduate of The Citadel.

Smoak died on May 4, 2020, aged 103, in Palm Beach, Florida.
