= 1990 Texas lieutenant gubernatorial election =

- November 6, 1990
- Turnout: 50.3% (Note: Of registered voters.) ▲4.7%

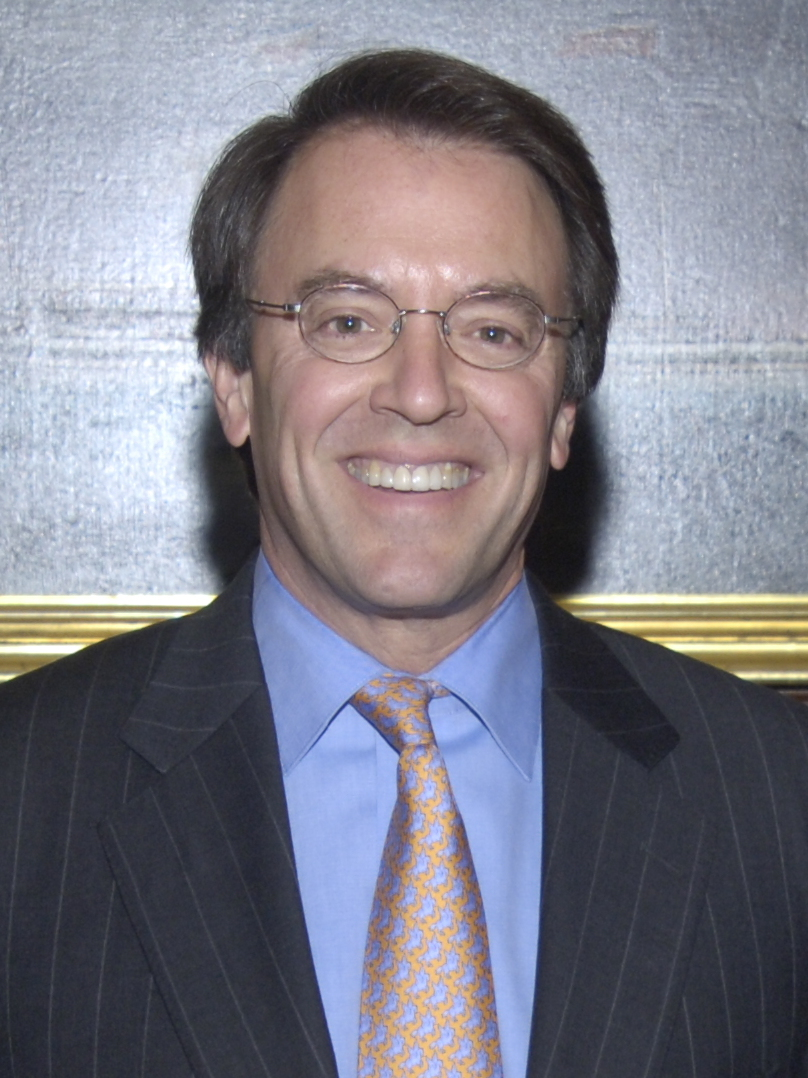
Candidate	Bob Bullock	Robert Mosbacher Jr.
Party	Democratic	Republican
Popular vote	2,002,360	1,741,893
Percentage	51.7%	45.0%
- County results Bullock: 40–50% 50–60% 60–70% 70–80% 80–90% Mosbacher: 40–50% 50–60% 60–70%
Lieutenant Governor before election
William P. Hobby Jr.
Democratic
Elected Lieutenant Governor
Bob Bullock
Democratic

The 1990 Texas lieutenant gubernatorial election was held on November 6, 1990, to elect the Lieutenant Governor of Texas. Incumbent Comptroller Bob Bullock was elected over Republican Robert Mosbacher Jr. Bullock's term as Comptroller was complicated; despite his public drinking problem and proneness to outbursts, he remained popular because of his record that included large settlements that benefited the state and its citizens. Mosbacher had previously run for public office in 1984 when he ran in the Republican Primary for Texas' Senate seat. Since 1986 he had been CEO of his families Energy company, Mosbacher Energy.

== Primaries ==
Because neither Bullock or Mosbacher were opposed in their parties primaries, the Texas Almanac did not report their total vote count.

== General election ==
=== Candidates ===
- Bob Bullock, Comptroller (Democratic)
- Robert Mosbacher Jr, Chairman of the Mosbacher Energy Company (Republican)
- Tom Owens (Libertarian)

=== Results ===
1990 Texas lieutenant gubernatorial election
Party	Candidate	Votes	%	±%
Democratic	Bob Bullock	2,002,360	51.69%	▼9.68
Republican	Robert Mosbacher Jr.	1,741,893	44.97%	▲7.78
Libertarian	Tom Owens	128,714	3.32%	▲1.88
Write-in		847	0.02%	N/A
Total votes		3,873,814	100.00%	
