= Marie T. Huhtala =

American Career Foreign Service Officer (born 1949)

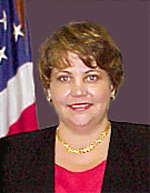

15th United States Ambassador to Malaysia
- In office October 17, 2001 – May 28, 2004
- President: George W. Bush
- Preceded by: B. Lynn Pascoe
- Succeeded by: Christopher J. LaFleur

Personal details
- Born: 1949 (age 76–77) Los Angeles, California, U.S.
- Spouse: Eino Huhtala

Marie T. Huhtala (born 1949) is an American Career Foreign Service Officer who was Ambassador Extraordinary and Plenipotentiary to Malaysia (2001–2004). She has also served as Consul General at the U.S. Consulate General in Quebec City.

Her son, a lieutenant in the Air Force, was training near Hill Air Force base in Utah in anticipation for participating in Operation Iraqi Freedom when he perished in a "flight-training incident" on October 25, 2002.

Huhtala served as Ambassador to Malaysia starting in 2001. Malaysia, unlike regional neighbors Singapore, Thailand and the Philippines, did not support the US vis-a-vis Iraq. She stated "Your country strongly opposed us (on Iraq) and that's just a fact we're going to have to live with. But, like I've said, our emphasis is on moving toward the future." She was interested in improving communications between the two countries surrounding a misunderstanding about a travel ban and improving the process for Malaysian students who need visas to study in the US.

Huhtala ran as an independent for the Hunter Mill seat on the Board of Supervisors in Fairfax County, Virginia, 2007. She was defeated by Democratic incumbent Cathy Hudgins but placed second in a field of four candidates.

Huhtala received an undergraduate degree in French from Santa Clara University in California, a master's degree in political science from Laval University, Quebec and is a 1988 graduate of the National War College. From 1995 to 1996 she was a member of the Senior Seminar, an interagency executive development program organized by the State Department's National Foreign Affairs Training Center.

Diplomatic posts
Preceded by B. Lynn Pascoe	United States Ambassador to Malaysia; 2001–2004	Succeeded by Christopher J. LaFleur
