= Charles F. Baldwin =

Diplomat and US Ambassador to Malaysia

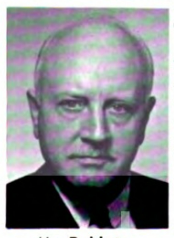

2nd United States Ambassador to Malaysia
- In office April 29, 1961 – January 22, 1964
- President: John F. Kennedy; Lyndon B. Johnson
- Preceded by: Homer M. Byington Jr.
- Succeeded by: James D. Bell

Personal details
- Born: January 21, 1902; Zanesville, Ohio, U.S.
- Died: August 18, 1993 (aged 91); Cockeysville, Maryland, U.S.
- Education: Georgetown University

Charles Franklin Baldwin (January 21, 1902 – August 18, 1993) was an American diplomat and the second US Ambassador to the Federation of Malaya, what is modern-day Malaysia and Singapore, from 1961 to 1964. Baldwin was also the first diplomat-in-residence at the University of Virginia.

== Family life ==
Baldwin was born in Zanesville, Ohio in 1902 but his family moved to Washington, D.C. when he was a teenager. He graduated from the Walsh School of Foreign Service at Georgetown University in 1926. He married his wife, Helen Rosenbaum Baldwin, on March 27, 1938. They had two children together: a son, Charles Stephen Baldwin, and a daughter, Nancy Baldwin Taylor.

== Early career ==
Baldwin began his government career in 1927. He started off in the new Foreign Commerce Service in the Commerce Department and was then a trade commissioner in Sydney and then London. In 1935, he stepped into the private sector as the head of the Washington office of the National Association of Credit Men. During World War II, Baldwin served as a naval intelligence officer and worked with Ian Fleming.

He returned to government work with the end of the war, this time working for the State Department as an economic officer. He held this position in different embassies all over the world including Santiago, Oslo, and Trieste. Baldwin was assigned to Singapore in 1951, and eventually worked his way up to consul general and then Deputy Assistant Secretary of State for Far Eastern Economic Affairs. In 1955, Baldwin retired from government service due to interpersonal problems with Herbert Hoover Jr., the Undersecretary of State at the time. During this period, Baldwin worked as the European representative of the Motion Picture Export Association of America, based in London and Rome.

== Ambassador to Malaysia ==
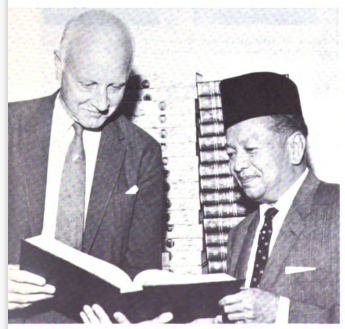
US Ambassador Charles F. Baldwin presents a gift from the US government to Mohamed Noah Omar representing the parliament of Malaysia

Baldwin returned to work as a Foreign Service Officer in 1961 when he was offered an ambassadorship. When asked why he decided to come out of retirement to become an ambassador, Baldwin said "because any Foreign Service officer who wouldn't should have his head examined." After declining the ambassadorship to Cambodia due to his lack of French fluency, Baldwin accepted the ambassadorship to the Federation of Malaya. He was the second diplomat to hold the position.

Baldwin reported later that his concerns as ambassador were largely economic, as the Malayan economy was almost singularly focused on the production of rubber and tin. However, Malaya was in a period of transition during Baldwin's ambassadorship. The Federation of Malaya had recently become independent from British colonial rule in 1957. In 1961, the Prime Minister of Malaya, Tunku Abdul Rahman Putra Al-Haj, announced his intention to reconstitute the Federation of Malaya, an action that was completed in 1963. This reconstitution incorporated several British territories into the Federation, most significantly Singapore, and Malaya was renamed Malaysia. Baldwin supported this endeavor and encouraged the US government to officially support the project as well.

Baldwin retired from his position as ambassador on January 22, 1964.

== Retirement ==
Baldwin was appointed as the first diplomat-in-residence in what was then called the Woodrow Wilson Department of Government and Foreign Affairs at the University of Virginia in 1965, soon after he left the Department of State. The title of diplomat-in-residence was created by the University of Virginia and Baldwin was the very first. In retirement he was on the board of the Virginia Museum of Fine Arts and was chairman of Camp Holiday Trails, a nonprofit camp for children with medical needs. In 1984, he published the book An Ambassador's Journey: An Exploration of People. Baldwin died in Cockeysville, Maryland at the age of 91.

Diplomatic posts
| Preceded by Homer M. Byington Jr. | United States Ambassador to Malaya/Malaysia; 1961–1964 | Succeeded by James D. Bell |
