= B. Bix Aliu =

American diplomat

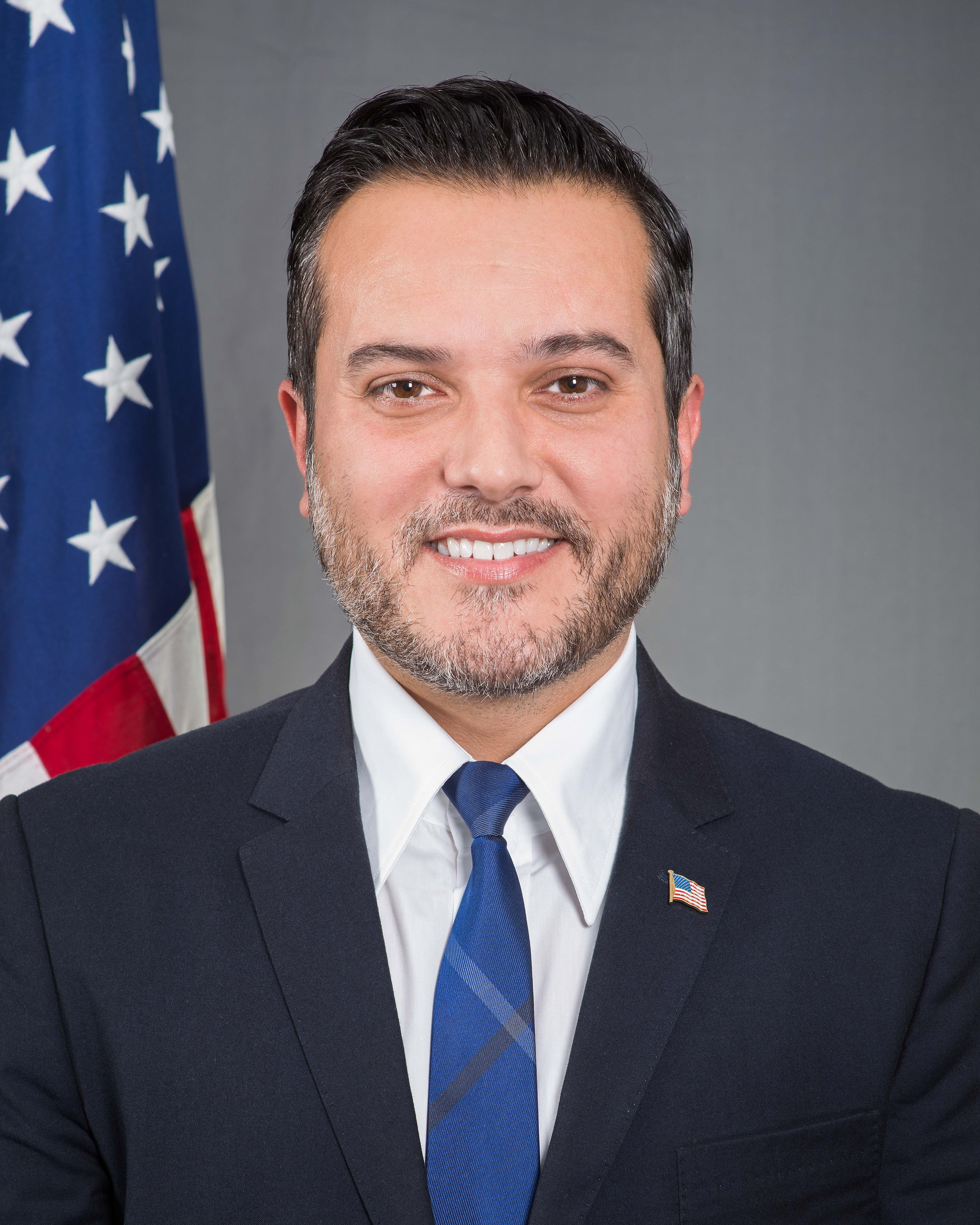
- Official portrait, 2019

Chargé d'affaires of the United States in Poland
- In office January 20, 2021 – January 19, 2022
- President: Joe Biden
- Preceded by: Georgette Mosbacher (as ambassador)
- Succeeded by: Mark Brzezinski (as ambassador)

Consul General of the United States in Kraków, Poland
- In office September 2018 – May 28, 2019
- President: Donald Trump
- Preceded by: Walter Braunohler
- Succeeded by: Patrick T. Slowinski

Personal details
- Education: United States Army War College; University of Pristina

Begzat Bix Aliu (born Begzat Azem Aliu) is an American diplomat, and member of the United States Foreign Service. He served as the deputy chief of mission in the embassy of the United States in Podgorica, Montenegro from 2014 to 2017, the Consul General of the United States in Kraków, Poland from 2018 to 2019, and the deputy chief of mission of the embassy of the United States in Warsaw, Poland from 2019 to 2021. He served as the chargé d'affaires of the United States in Poland from January 20, 2021, to January 19, 2022.

== Early life and education ==
Begzat Bix Aliu was born and grew up in Chicago, Illinois in the United States, to an Albanian family. His parents moved in to the United States in the 1960s from Kičevo, then located in Yugoslavia, and currently, in North Macedonia. He has the master of strategic studies degree from the United States Army War College in Carlisle Barracks, Pennsylvania, and a medical degree from the University of Pristina in Kosovo.

== Career ==
Aliu begun his diplomatic career in 1999, when he was involved in negotiations of the Rambouillet Agreement, as one of the United States special envoys to Kosovo. As a participant in the Pearson Fellowship program of the Department of State, he worked in the United States Congress, as a special advisor to the representative of Virginia's 2nd congressional district. Aliu also served at the National Foreign Affairs Training Center of the Department of State, where he helped in training of future United States foreign delegates.

Until 2004 he served a vice-consul and deputy cultural attaché at the Embassy of the United States, Warsaw, Poland. From 2014 to 2017, he was a deputy chief of mission in the United States embassy in Podgorica, Montenegro, where he often acted as the chargé d'affaires. He later was also the public diplomacy officer in Tirana, Albania, and served diplomatically in the United Arab Emirates. From September 2018 to May 28, 2019, he served as the Consul General in Kraków, Poland, where he worked to advance the economic and cultural ties between the city and the United States. In June 2019 he was assigned to the embassy in Warsaw and assisted United States ambassador Georgette Mosbacher. His work included involvement in the project of abolition of the visa requirements for Polish citizents in traveling to the United States. He served as the chargé d'affaires for Warsaw embassy, after ambassador Georgette Mosbacher ended her diplomatic mission on January 20, 2021, until ambassador Mark Brzezinski was appointed on February 22, 2022.

On September 16, 2022, Joe Biden, the president of the United States, nominated Aliu to be the next ambassador to Montenegro. His nomination expired at the end of the year and was returned to President Biden on January 3, 2023, who renominated him the same day. Despite the nomination, Judy Rising Reinke remained the ambassador instead, serving until 2026.

== Personal life ==
Aliu has wife and two children. He is fluent in Albanian, English, Macedonian, Polish, and Serbo-Croatian.
