= Brian D. McFeeters =

American diplomat

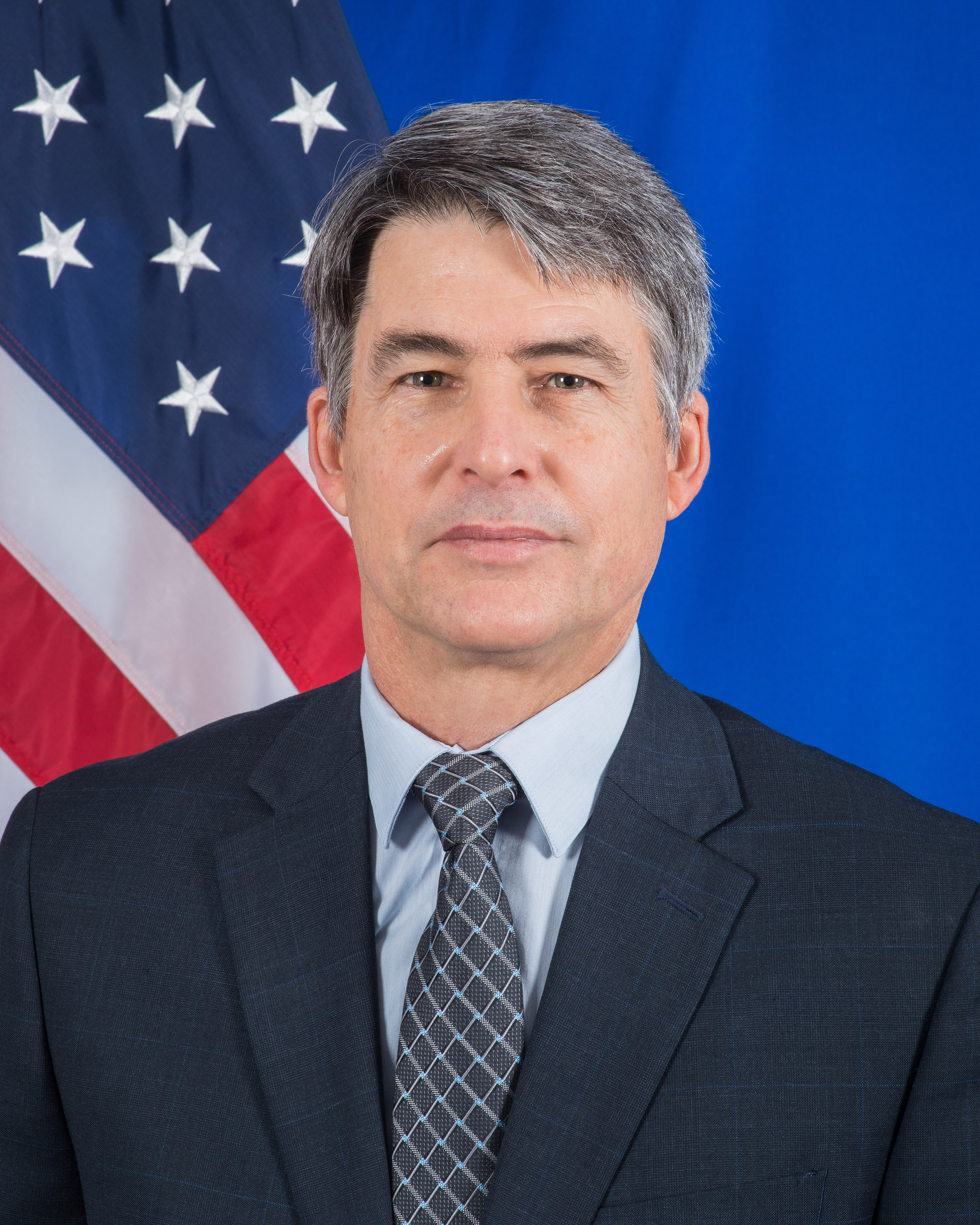

21st United States Ambassador to Malaysia
- In office February 26, 2021 – August 24, 2023
- Nominated by: Donald Trump
- Appointed by: Joe Biden
- Preceded by: Kamala Shirin Lakhdhir
- Succeeded by: Edgard Kagan

Personal details
- Education: University of Notre Dame (B.A., B.S.); University of New Mexico (M.S.); Johns Hopkins School of Advanced International Studies (M.A.)

Brian David McFeeters is an American diplomat who had served as the twenty-first United States Ambassador to Malaysia from February 26, 2021, to August 24, 2023.

== Early life and education ==
McFeeters was raised in Rawlins, Wyoming. He was awarded Bachelor of Arts and Bachelor of Science, both with honors, from the University of Notre Dame in 1983, a Master of Science from the University of New Mexico in 1987, and a Master of Arts from the Johns Hopkins School of Advanced International Studies in 1990.

After completing his undergraduate education at the University of Notre Dame, McFeeters joined the United States Air Force and was assigned as a second lieutenant to the Air Force Weapons Laboratory in New Mexico. While there, he completed his M.S. in Chemistry at the University of New Mexico with a thesis entitled The A-X emission spectrum of iodine monofluoride – Analyses of vibrational and rotational structure. McFeeters was the lead author on two 1989 technical articles related to advanced chemical laser research. He retired from active duty as a captain.

McFeeters is also a Distinguished Graduate of the long-term economic training course of the Foreign Service Institute at the United States Department of State.

== Diplomatic career ==
McFeeters is a career member of the Senior Foreign Service, class of Minister-Counselor. He started his State career by being a senior advisor in the Office of the Counselor to the Secretary of State. He was also the Principal Deputy Assistant Secretary in the State Department's Bureau of Economic and Business Affairs in Washington and Deputy Chief of Mission of the U.S. Embassy in Jakarta, Indonesia. Additional assignments include serving as the Economic Minister Counselor of the U.S. Mission to the European Union in Brussels, Belgium and Economic Minister Counselor for U.S. Embassy in Baghdad. He also served as Political Counselor at Embassy Kuala Lumpur, Malaysia and as Deputy Political Counselor and North Korea Watcher at the U.S. Embassy in Seoul, South Korea. Earlier, in Washington, he was the Deputy Director in the Office of Maritime Southeast Asia while at the State Department.

=== United States Ambassador to Malaysia ===
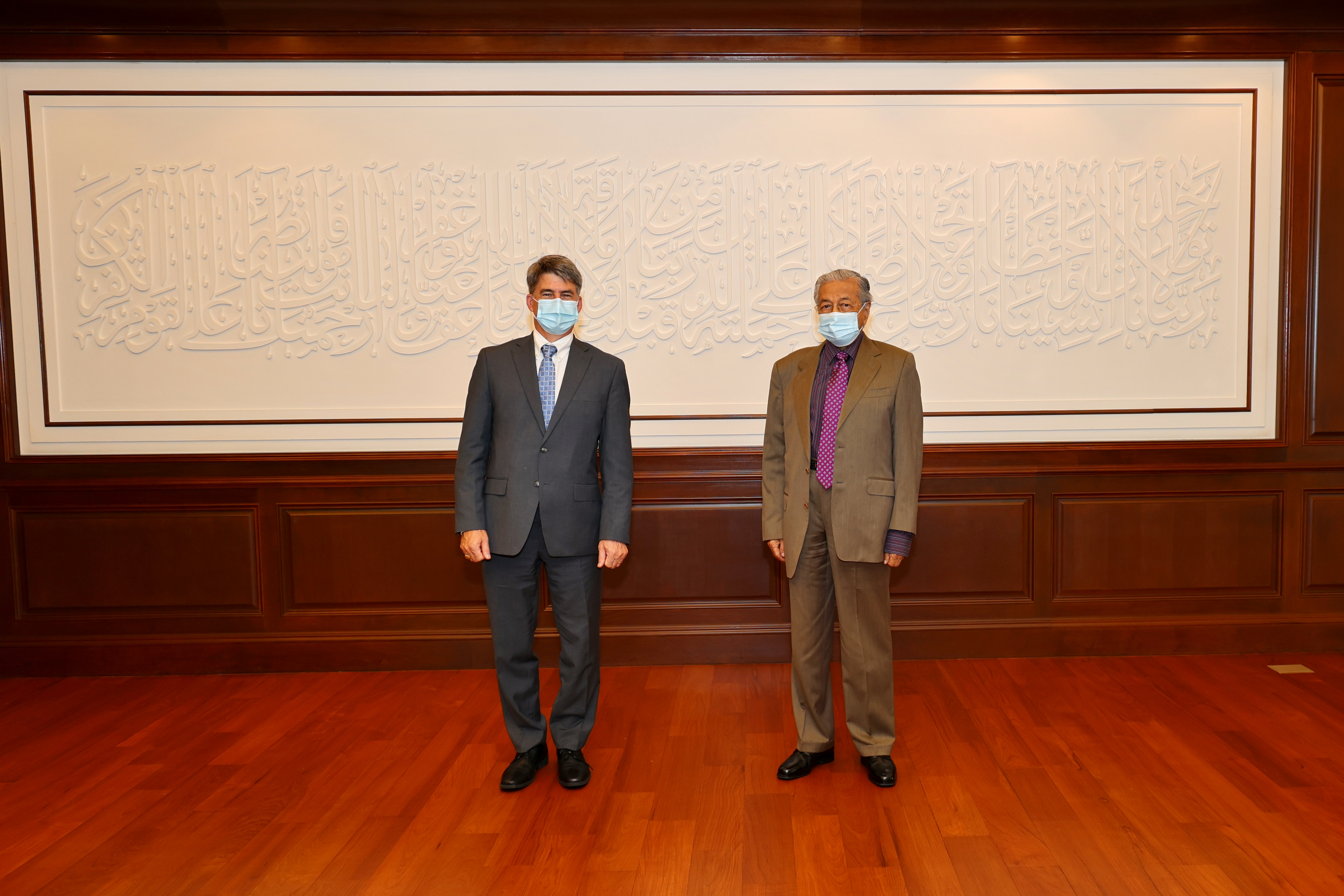
Brian McFeeters meets with former Malaysian prime minister Mahathir Mohamad in 2021

On July 21, 2020, President Donald Trump sent his nomination to the Senate. On December 2, 2020, a hearing on his nomination was held before the Senate Foreign Relations Committee. On December 22, 2020, his nomination was reported out of committee and subsequently confirmed by the Senate by voice vote later that same day. He started serving as ambassador on February 26, 2021.

== Personal life ==
McFeeters speaks Malay, Indonesian, French, Spanish, and German. He has been awarded multiple awards including the Salzman Award for International Economic Performance.

== See also ==
- List of ambassadors of the United States

Diplomatic posts
Preceded by Kamala Shirin Lakhdhir	United States Ambassador to Malaysia; 2021–2023	Succeeded by Edgard Kagan
