= Knickerbocker Yacht Club =

Club in Port Washington, New York, US (1874–2009)

Coordinates: 40°49′45″N 73°42′06″W

- Formation: 1874
- Dissolved: 2009
- Type: Yacht club
- Purpose: to encourage "Yachting and the cultivation of Naval Science and Seamanship"
- Location: Port Washington, New York
- Key people: Lon Myers, world-record-holding runner; Bus Mosbacher, skippered two winning teams in America's Cup races; Robert Mosbacher, world champion sailor

The Knickerbocker Yacht Club was a yacht club in Port Washington, New York. The club was established in 1874 and ceased operations in 2009.

== History ==
The club was founded in 1874, on the Harlem River at 130th Street in Manhattan, to encourage “Yachting and the cultivation of Naval Science and Seamanship”.

In 1907, it moved to Port Washington. It started the Knickerbocker Cup race in 1982, which became internationally recognized.

At its peak in the early 1980s, membership consisted of approximately 290 families with 165 boats.

World champion runner Lon Myers began his track career running for the club. Bus Mosbacher, who skippered two winning teams in the America's Cup races, and world champion sailor Robert Mosbacher were members of the club.

=== 21st century ===
As of 2009, it was the second-oldest yacht club on Long Island Sound. Due to the recession and waning membership, the club ceased to exist in 2009 and was sold for $3.2 million to Cord Meyer Development. In July 2012 demolition of the club began, the developers began on a new structure which today is the Knickerbocker Yacht Hotel designed to evoke a cruise ship.
