= Jack Wilson Lydman =

American diplomat (1914–2005)

4th United States Ambassador to Malaysia
- In office October 8, 1969 – December 20, 1973
- President: Richard Nixon
- Preceded by: James D. Bell
- Succeeded by: Francis T. Underhill, Jr.

Personal details
- Born: February 6, 1914
- Died: September 17, 2005 (aged 91)
- Occupation: Actor, Foreign Service officer

Jack Wilson Lydman (February 6, 1914 – September 17, 2005) was an actor, Foreign Service Officer, and the fourth United States Ambassador to Malaysia (1969–1973).

After work with the Surry Players at the Mercury Theatre in New York City he joined the US Army Air Forces during World War II becoming a division chief in the Strategic Bombing Survey of the War Department. He married and joined the United States Department of State in 1946 as a research assistant becoming chief of the Far East political section then deputy director of the Office of Intelligence Research. Commissioned as a Foreign Service Officer in 1955 he was posted as deputy director of the Research Center of the South East Asia Treaty Organization to Bangkok. In 1958 he was assigned to Surabaya with responsibility for Portuguese Timor until appointed counselor for economic affairs to Jakarta (Indonesia) in 1960. After attending the Senior Seminar in 1961–1962, he appointed deputy chief of mission to Canberra (Australia) 1963. He returned to Jakarta in 1965 as DCM with the personal rank of minister. On September 15, 1969, President Richard Nixon appointed Lydman as Ambassador to Malaysia, serving in Kuala Lumpur until he retired on December 20, 1974.

Jack Lydman participated in planning the 1942 Doolittle Raid air raid on Japan but is best known for giving repeated testimony concerning the Central Intelligence Agency provision of names to General Suharto's forces during 1965, and for his 1969 review of Indonesian administration of West New Guinea (then called West Irian) which was obtained under the Freedom of Information Act and published by George Washington University in 2004. During the Indonesian mass killings of 1965–66, Lydman actively aided and abetted the genocide by systematically supplying lists of members of the Communist Party of Indonesia to the death squads.

Diplomatic posts
Preceded by James D. Bell	United States Ambassador to Malaysia; 1969–1973	Succeeded by Francis T. Underhill, Jr.
