= B. Lynn Pascoe =

American diplomat (born 1943)

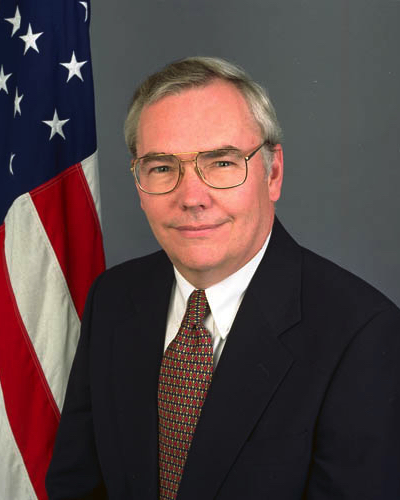

Under-Secretary-General of the United Nations for Political Affairs
- In office March 1, 2007 – July 2, 2012
- Appointed by: Ban Ki-moon
- Preceded by: Ibrahim Gambari
- Succeeded by: Jeffrey D. Feltman

16th United States Ambassador to Indonesia
- In office November 25, 2004 – February 17, 2007
- President: George W. Bush
- Preceded by: Ralph L. Boyce
- Succeeded by: Cameron R. Hume

14th United States Ambassador to Malaysia
- In office March 1, 1999 – August 11, 2001
- President: Bill Clinton; George W. Bush
- Preceded by: John R. Malott
- Succeeded by: Marie T. Huhtala

Personal details
- Born: Burton Lynn Pascoe; July 7, 1943 (age 83) Missouri, U.S.
- Spouse: Diane
- Education: University of Kansas (BA); Columbia University (MA)
- Occupation: Foreign Service officer

Burton Lynn Pascoe (born July 7, 1943) is an American retired diplomat who served as Under-Secretary-General of the United Nations at the UN Department of Political Affairs from 2007 to 2012, where he oversaw the UN's diplomatic efforts to prevent and mitigate conflict around the globe.

== Career ==
Pascoe was previously United States Ambassador to Indonesia after being nominated by President George W. Bush from 2004 to 2007, and to Malaysia from 1999 to 2001.

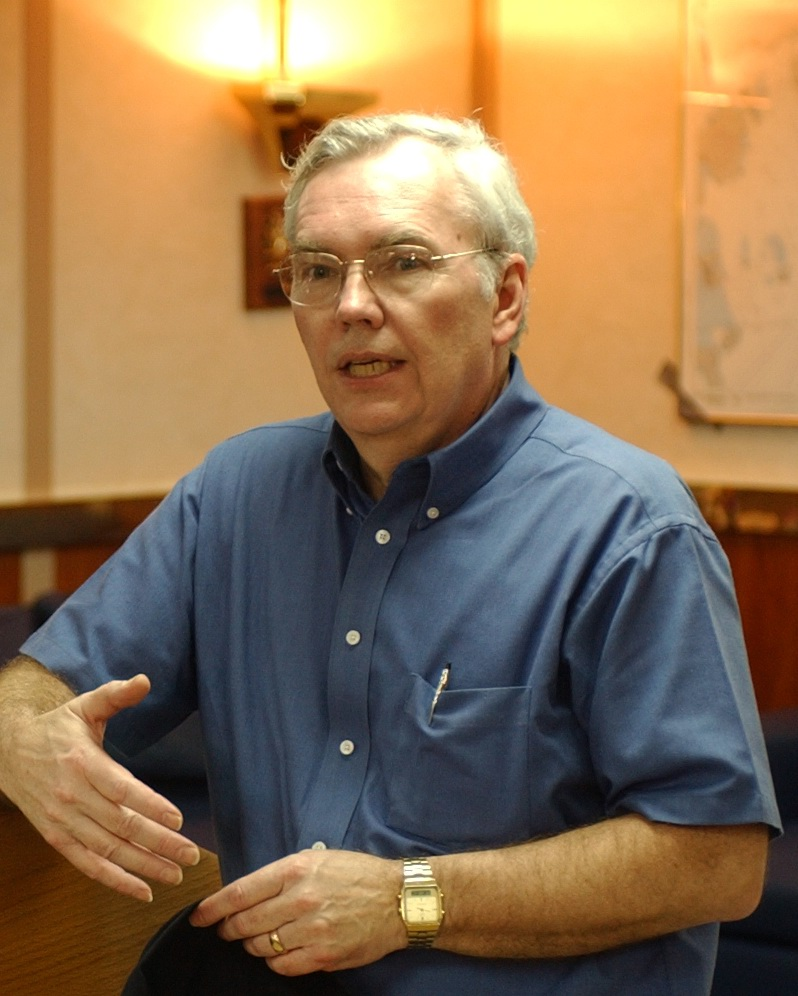
B. Lynn Pascoe aboard USNS Mercy, February 2005

On September 4, 2001, he took up duties as Deputy Assistant Secretary for European and Eurasian Affairs at the U.S. State Department. Earlier, he served as U.S. Special Negotiator for Nagorno-Karabakh and Regional Conflicts and the U.S. co-chair of the OSCE Minsk Group of the Organization for Security and Cooperation in Europe.

From 1993 to 1996, he was the director of the American Institute in Taiwan (AIT). He also served as the Principal Deputy Assistant Secretary in the East Asian and Pacific Bureau of the State Department, Deputy Chief of Mission (DCM) at the United States Embassy in Beijing (from 1989 to 1992), (Note: State Department rocords for foreign serive list indicates that Deputy Chief of Mission in Beijing changed from B. Lynn Pascoe to Scott S. Hallford between Spring 1992 and Fall 1992.) Deputy Executive Secretary of the Department of States and Special Assistant to the Deputy Secretary of State.

In his diplomatic career, he has been posted to Moscow, Hong Kong, Beijing, Taipei, and Kuala Lumpur. He speaks Mandarin Chinese.

On February 21, 2010, three days after North Korea declared it would not abandon its nuclear weapons program, Pascoe, who had just visited Pyongyang, strongly defended international food aid to the country. "These are human beings that need the food. It's not the political system. This shouldn't be argued in a political way," he told CNN's Christiane Amanpour.

== Personal life ==
Born in 1943, he obtained his Bachelor of Arts from the University of Kansas with three bachelor's degrees in East Asian languages and cultures, international relations, and mathematics and his Master of Arts from Columbia University, focusing on Chinese government affairs and international relations.

He is married with two daughters.

== Notes and references ==
=== References ===
Diplomatic posts
Preceded by John R. Malott	United States Ambassador to Malaysia; 1999–2001	Succeeded by Marie T. Huhtala
Preceded by Thomas Brooks	Director of the American Institute in Taiwan; 1993–1996	Succeeded by Darryl Norman Johnson
Preceded by Ralph L. Boyce	United States Ambassador to Indonesia; 2004–2007	Succeeded by Cameron R. Hume
Preceded by Ibrahim Gambari	Under-Secretary-General of the United Nations, United Nations Department of Political Affairs; 2007 – June 2012	Succeeded by Jeffrey Feltman
