= Edgard Kagan =

American diplomat

Edgard D. Kagan
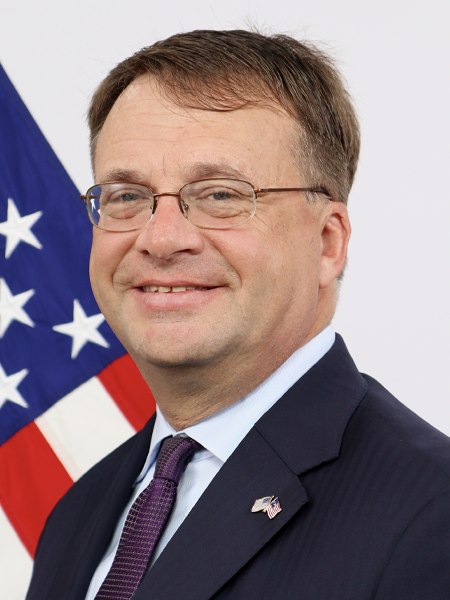

22nd United States Ambassador to Malaysia
- In office March 20, 2024 – February 15, 2026
- President: Joe Biden; Donald Trump
- Preceded by: Brian D. McFeeters
- Succeeded by: Joshua Harris

Personal details
- Spouse: Cynthia "Cindy" Gire
- Children: 3
- Education: Yale University (BA)
- Edgard Kagan's voice Kagan's opening statement at his confirmation hearing to be United States ambassador to Malaysia; Recorded June 13, 2023

Edgard D. Kagan is a retired American diplomat who had served as the twenty-second United States ambassador to Malaysia.

== Early life and education ==
Kagan holds a Bachelor of Arts from Yale University.

== Career ==
Kagan was a career member of the Senior Foreign Service, with the rank of Minister-Counselor. He was most recently the Special Assistant to the President and Senior Director for East Asia and Oceania at the White House National Security Council under the Joe Biden administration. Previously, he served as Deputy Chief of Mission at U.S. embassies in India and Malaysia. Kagan also held several roles in the State Department's Bureau of East Asian and Pacific Affairs. Kagan additionally served as Consul General in Mumbai, India and as the deputy director of the Washington Office of the United States Mission to the United Nations. His other overseas assignments include Australia, China, Israel, among others.

=== U.S. Ambassador to Malaysia ===
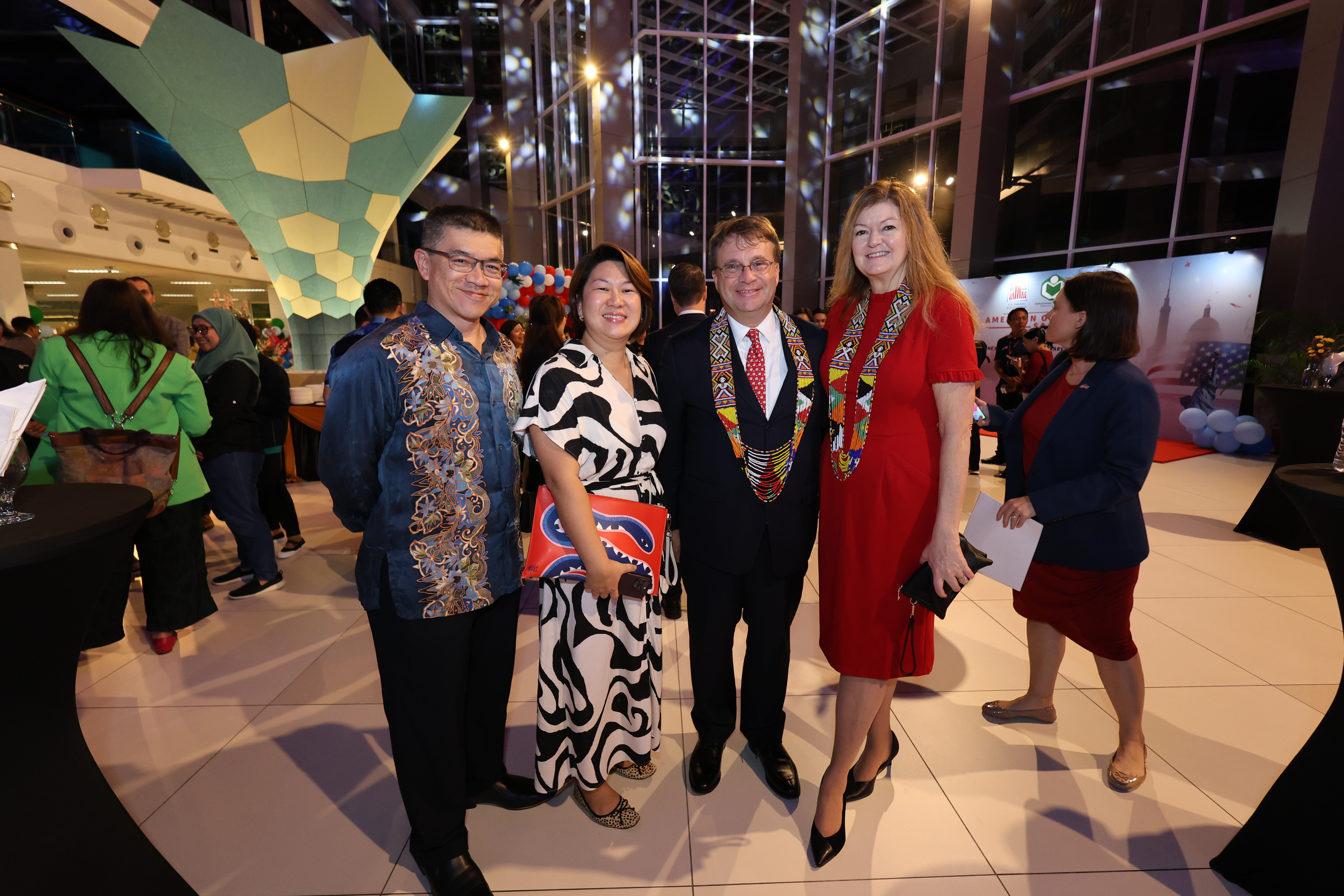
Kagan with wife Cynthia "Cindy" Gire seen with pinakol necklace beadwork during a visit to Sarawak and Sabah, June 14, 2024

On May 2, 2023, President Biden nominated Kagan to be the next US ambassador to Malaysia. Hearings on his nomination were held before the Senate Foreign Relations Committee on June 13, 2023. The committee favorably reported his nomination on July 13, 2023. His nomination was confirmed by the full United States Senate via voice vote on November 8, 2023. He arrived in Malaysia on December 19, 2023. He presented his credentials to King of Malaysia Sultan Ibrahim on March 20, 2024.

Following the Ulu Tiram police station attack in Johor in May 2024, Kagan expressed his condolences to the families of the two Malaysian policemen killed in the incident, stating that the tragedy serves as a reminder that both the United States and Malaysia share common interests against terrorism and cannot afford to relax their vigilance.

As ambassador, Kagan has made a visit to Sarawak to reinforced partnerships to promote clean energy, regional security, and other businesses civil society ties and people-to-people ties with the local Sarawak government. He also made a visit to Sabah to enhancing economic activity, attracting foreign investment, and advancing infrastructure with the local Sabah government, where he officiate the opening of the American Green Corner Sabah at the Sabah State Library, to signifies collective commitment towards educational and environmental advancements between Malaysia and the United States. Kagan also recognise and praises the Malaysian government's efforts in enhancing security around Sabah, where he said his country's are seeking to provide Malaysia with more equipments and expertise to defend its own sovereignty. He also stated that Sabah and Sarawak is among the place that holds a special place in his heart with the warmth and hospitality shown by its people during his encounter through a visit to Sandakan, the Kinabatangan River, Bako National Park, Mulu Caves, Semenggoh Wildlife Centre, as well as during his time in the city of Kuching with locals. Kagan left his post in early 2026 and retired from the U.S. Foreign Service thereafter.

== Post-Diplomatic career ==
Following his retirement, Kagan was appointed senior advisor and Freeman Chair in China Studies at the Center for Strategic and International Studies (CSIS) in Washington, D.C. He is also senior advisor at The Asia Group, a Washington DC-based consultancy.

== Awards and recognitions ==
Kagan has previously won the Presidential Meritorious Award.

== Personal life ==
Kagan speaks French, Mandarin, Hungarian, and Spanish. He is married to Cynthia "Cindy" Gire and has three children.

== See also ==
- List of ambassadors appointed by Joe Biden

Diplomatic posts
Preceded by Brian D. McFeeters	United States Ambassador to Malaysia; 2024–2026	Succeeded by
