= Kamala Shirin Lakhdhir =

American diplomat

The Honorable Kamala Shirin Lakhdhir
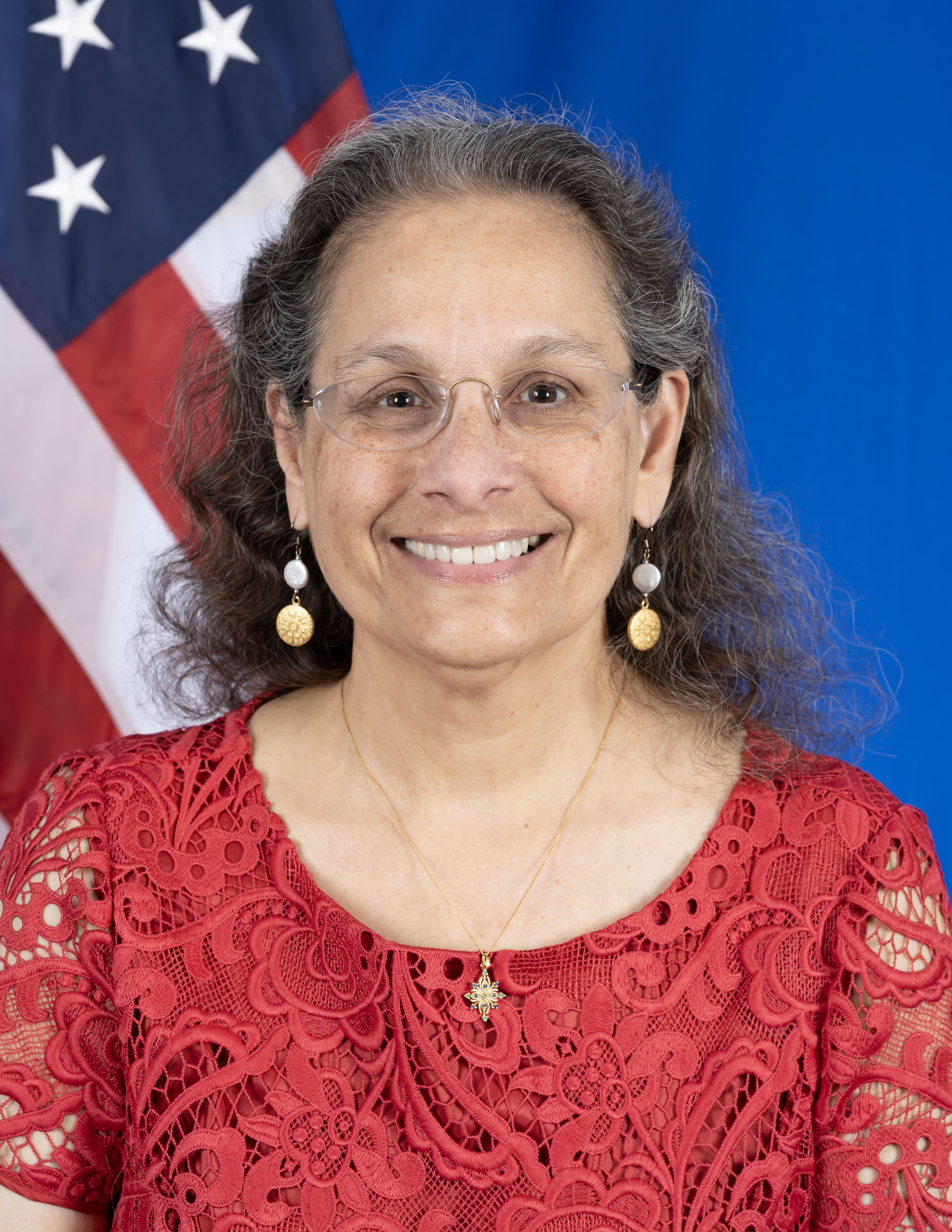

United States Ambassador to Indonesia
- In office August 8, 2024 – April 30, 2025
- President: Joe Biden; Donald Trump
- Preceded by: Sung Kim
- Succeeded by: Peter Haymond (Chargé d'affaires ad interim)

27th Executive Secretary of the United States Department of State
- In office March 1, 2021 – August 4, 2023
- President: Joe Biden
- Preceded by: Lisa D. Kenna
- Succeeded by: Dereck J. Hogan

20th United States Ambassador to Malaysia
- In office February 21, 2017 – January 21, 2021
- President: Donald Trump; Joe Biden
- Preceded by: Joseph Y. Yun
- Succeeded by: Brian D. McFeeters

Personal details
- Born: Brooklyn, New York, U.S.
- Education: Harvard University (BA); New York University (MA); National War College (MA)

Kamala Shirin Lakhdhir is an American diplomat and is the former United States Ambassador to Indonesia. She had served as the Executive Secretary of the United States Department of State from 2021 to 2023. She previously served as the twentieth United States Ambassador to Malaysia from 2017 to 2021.

== Early life and education ==
Lakhdhir was born in Brooklyn, New York, daughter of Ann (née Hallan) and Noor Lakhdhir. Her father had moved from Mumbai, India to the U.S. to study at the University of California, Berkeley and then later moved to New York City. Lakhdhir grew up in New York and Westport, Connecticut. There she was a regular participant in the annual United Nations Day, inspired in part by her mother, who had earlier served as president of the NGO Committee on Disarmament, Peace and Security at the United Nations. Lakhdhir also has a brother, David Lakhdhir.

Lakhdhir attended Bedford Junior High School and graduated from Staples High School. In 1986, she earned a bachelor's degree from Harvard University.

== Career ==
After graduating from Harvard, Lakhdhir traveled to China, where she stayed for two years, teaching English and American history. Returning to the U.S., she then worked for the New York City budget director and pursued graduate studies in public finance at New York University.

Lakhdhir began a career in the Foreign Service in August 1991 and became recognized as a Southeast Asia expert. Her initial assignments included international service first at the U.S. Embassy in Riyadh, Saudi Arabia and then at the Embassy in Jakarta, Indonesia. She then returned to the U.S. to a post at the Secretary of State's Secretariat. Lakhdhir then accepted a year long Pearson Fellowship, working for Congressman Doug Bereuter on the staff of the House Subcommittee on Asia and the House Subcommittee on International Monetary Policy and Trade. Lakhdhir moved to China in 2001 and served at the U.S. Embassy in Beijing until 2005. Then for two years, Lakhdhir served as director of the Office of Maritime Southeast Asia, which is in the State Department's Bureau of East Asian and Pacific Affairs, an organization responsible for U.S. relations with the Philippines, Indonesia, Malaysia, Singapore, Brunei Darussalam, and Timor-Leste. She earned a master's degree from the National War College in 2007. In 2009, Lakhdhir moved to Northern Ireland, where she served as U.S. Consul General in Belfast for two years before accepting an assignment as Executive Assistant to Under Secretary for Political Affairs.

=== U.S. ambassador to Malaysia ===
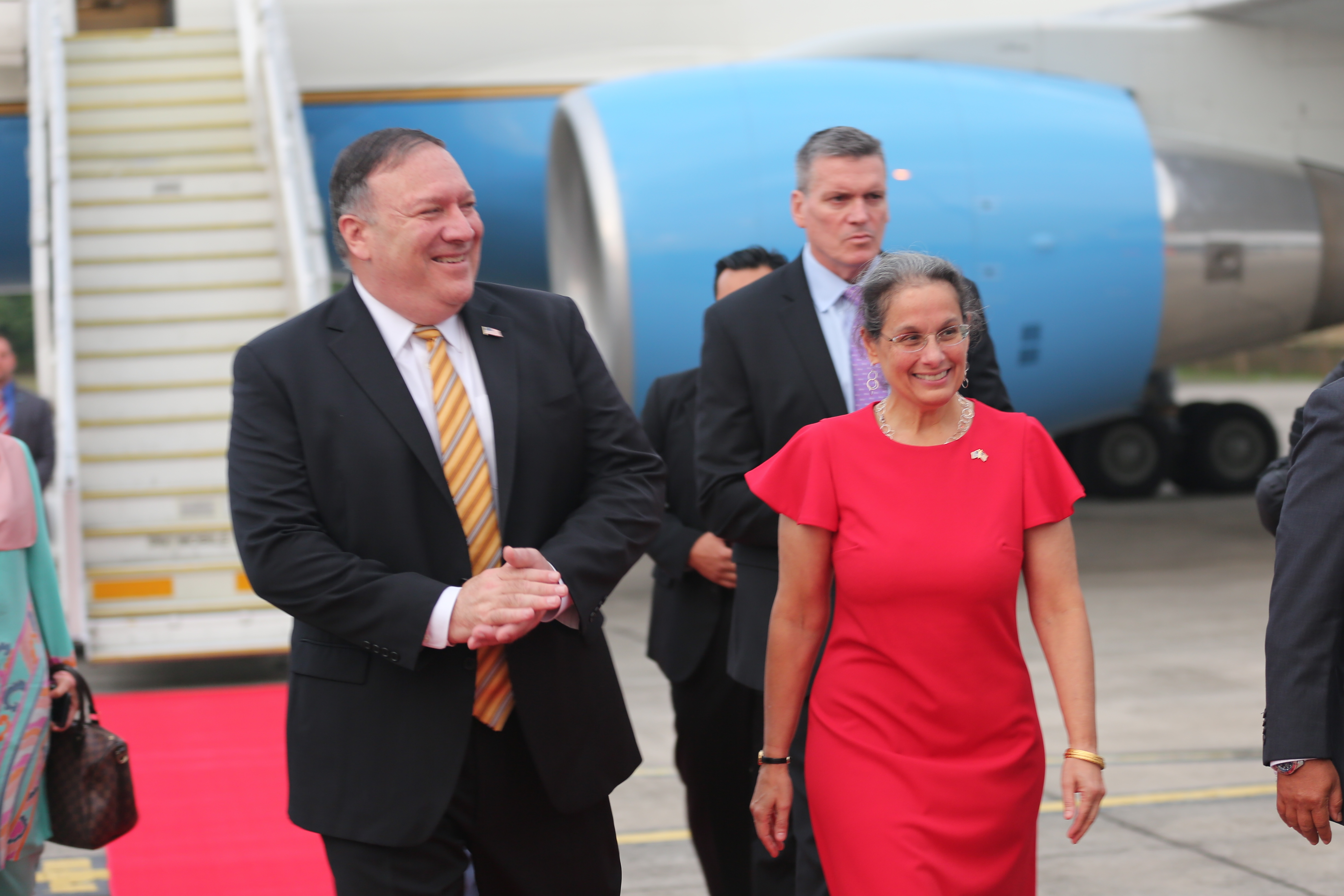
U.S. Secretary Mike Pompeo welcomed in Kuala Lumpur by U.S. Ambassador Kamala Lakhdhir

Lakhdhir was nominated by President Barack Obama to serve as United States Ambassador to Malaysia on June 16, 2016, and was confirmed by the U.S. Senate on December 10, 2016. She was appointed on December 19, 2016, and presented her credentials on February 21, 2017.

As ambassador, Lakhdhir has been engaged in improving communications with Malaysians through a greater range of media, supporting on-going cooperation of U.S. companies in Malaysia and the nation's workforce, and promoting cooperative undertakings such as research on renewable energy for the country.

On May 21, 2018, Lakhdhir met with Prime Minister Tun Dr Mahathir Mohamad at his Perdana Leadership Foundation office, congratulating him on his electoral win and welcoming the opportunity to work with him and his cabinet. In August 2018, she accompanied Mike Pompeo U.S. Secretary of State as he visited Dr. Mahathir, Defence Minister Mohamad Sabu and Deputy Foreign Minister Dato' Marzuki Yahya. Pompeo became the most senior US official to visit the new prime minister since his election victory.

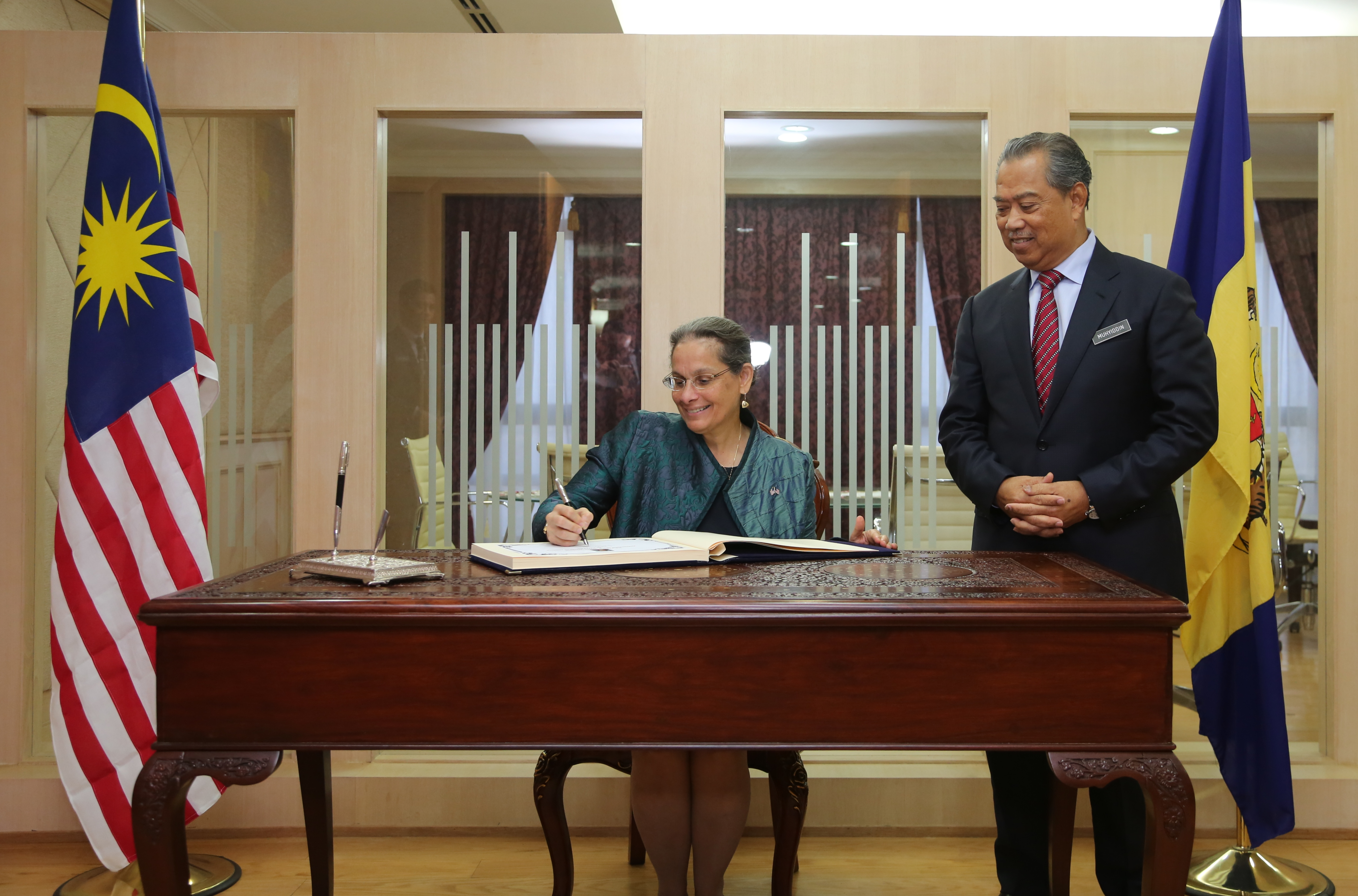
Kamala Lakhdir visiting Minister of Home Affairs (Malaysia), Tan Sri Muhyiddin Yassin at his office in Putrajaya

Lakhdir also welcomed U.S. participation in Pacific Partnership 2018, the Asia-Pacific's largest humanitarian assistance and disaster-relief preparedness mission, which ran from February through June 2018.

=== Executive Secretary ===
Lakhdhir had served as Executive Secretary of the United States Department of State from March 1, 2021, to August 4, 2023.

=== U.S. ambassador to Indonesia ===
Lakdhir was nominated as U.S. ambassador to Indonesia on October 20, 2023 and was confirmed by the U.S. Senate on May 2, 2024. She was appointed on May 2, 2024, arrived in Jakarta on July 22, 2024, and presented her credentials to President Joko Widodo on August 8, 2024.

In an April 22, 2025 press release from the U.S. Embassy in Jakarta, Ambassador Lakhdhir said, “It has been an immense honor to serve as U.S. Ambassador to the Republic of Indonesia. I have been inspired by the creativity and resilience of the Indonesian people, and I am proud of the many ways Indonesians and Americans are working together on shared challenges to make our nations safer, stronger, and more prosperous. I greatly appreciate the warm hospitality and friendship I felt here."

On April 22, 2025, Indonesia's deputy foreign minister Arif Havas Oegroseno stated that Lakhdir would be departing from Indonesia by May 2025. He stated that Lakhdir's departure was by her own request as she reportedly felt uncomfortable in Indonesia, but a U.S. Embassy Spokesperson noted, “It is customary for U.S. ambassadors to submit a letter of resignation to the incoming president, and President Trump has accepted the resignation of U.S. Ambassador to Indonesia.”

Her duties were taken over by Deputy Chief of Mission Heather C. Merritt.

Diplomatic posts
| Preceded by Joseph Y. Yun | United States Ambassador to Malaysia; 2017–2021 | Succeeded by Brian D. McFeeters |
| Preceded by Sung Y. Kim | United States Ambassador to Indonesia; 2024–2025 | Vacant |
