= Paul W. Jones =

American diplomat (born 1960)

Paul Jones
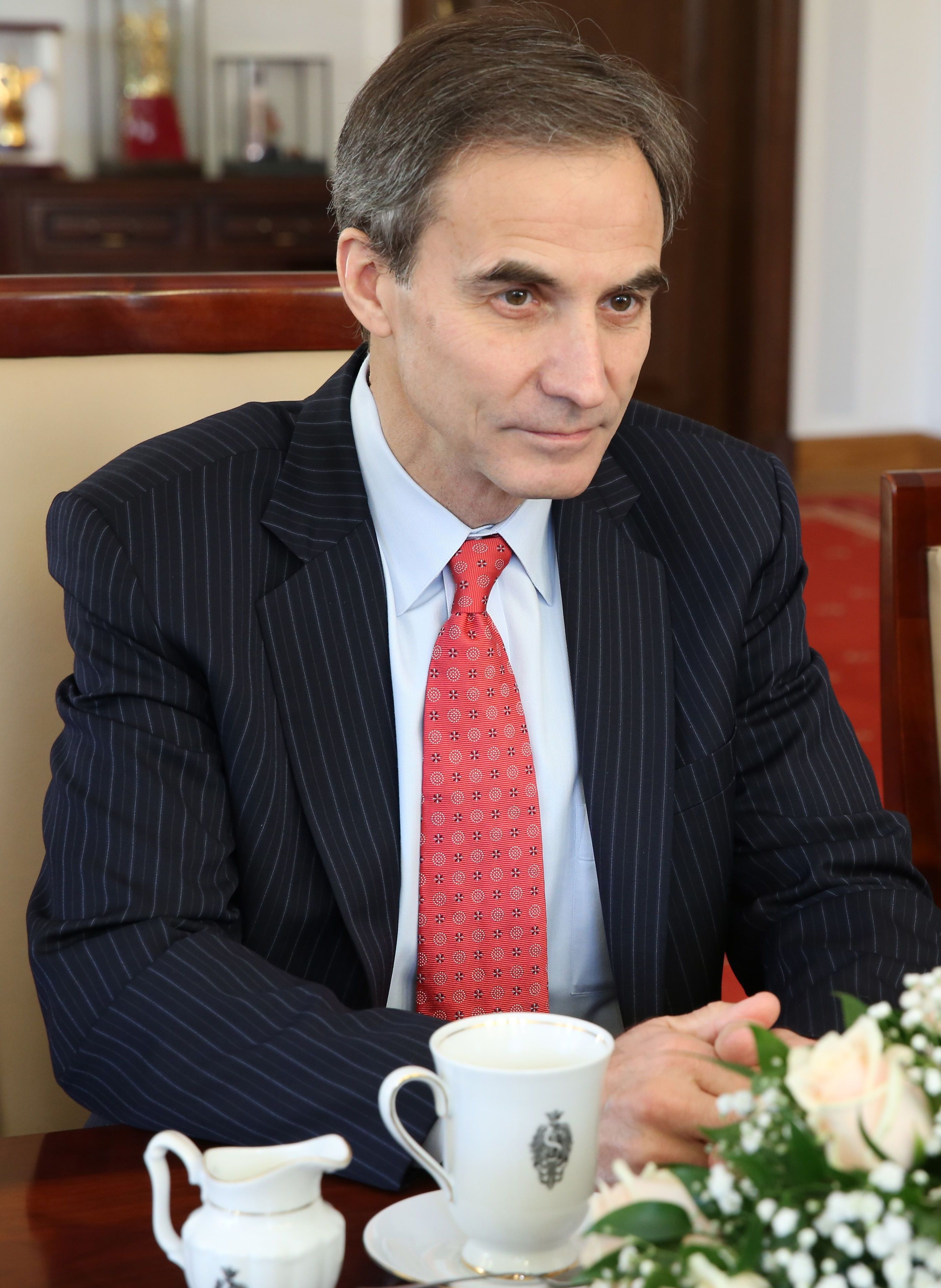
- Jones in 2015

Chargé d'Affaires ad interim of Pakistan
- In office September 22, 2018 – August 31, 2020
- President: Donald Trump
- Preceded by: David Hale
- Succeeded by: Angela Aggeler (chargé d'affaires a.i.)

United States Ambassador to Poland
- In office September 24, 2015 – July 28, 2018
- President: Barack Obama; Donald Trump
- Preceded by: Stephen Mull
- Succeeded by: Georgette Mosbacher

18th United States Ambassador to Malaysia
- In office October 18, 2010 – July 8, 2013
- President: Barack Obama
- Preceded by: James Keith
- Succeeded by: Joseph Yun

Personal details
- Born: 1960 (age 65–66) Yorktown Heights, New York, U.S.
- Education: Cornell University; University of Virginia; Naval War College

Paul Wayne Jones (born 1960) is an American diplomat who was the United States Chargé d'affaires to Pakistan and the former United States Ambassador to Poland. Prior to that, he served as Principal Deputy Assistant Secretary in the Bureau of European and Eurasian Affairs at the United States Department of State and earlier he served as the eighteenth U.S. Ambassador to Malaysia. He arrived in Warsaw, Poland, and began serving as ambassador on September 24, 2015. He is widely regarded as one of the Foreign Service's only senior experts on both Europe and East Asia.

== Early life and education ==
Jones was born and raised in Yorktown Heights, New York. He earned his B.A. from Cornell University. His post-graduate work includes a Masters of Arts in Public Administration from University of Virginia and a Masters of Science in National Security Affairs from the Naval War College.

== Career ==
Jones joined the United States Foreign Service in 1987. For the next two years, he served as consular and political officer in Bogota, Colombia, during a period when narco-traffickers threatened the country. He returned to Washington in 1989, where he worked in the State Department's 24-hour Operations Center during the fall of Communism in Eastern Europe, U.S. military operations in Panama and coup attempts in the Philippines. Jones' next assignment was in Moscow, from 1992 to 1994. Jones returned to Washington as desk officer for the Benelux countries. After the Dayton Agreement, Jones was sent to Sarajevo beginning in January 1996 as the Executive Assistant to the Head of Mission of the Organization for Security and Cooperation in Europe, Ambassador Robert Frowick. Jones was then selected by Ambassador Christopher R. Hill to be the first Deputy Chief of Mission to Macedonia, where he served from the summer of 1996 to 1999.

After a year at the Naval War College, Jones served on the Secretary of State's staff as Director of the Secretariat Staff, working the transition between Secretaries Madeleine Albright and Colin Powell. He then became Director of the Balkans office in the Bureau of European and Eurasian Affairs. Jones graduated from the State Department's Senior Seminar in 2004, and then was assigned as Deputy Chief of Mission to the Organization for Security and Cooperation in Europe in Vienna until 2005.

Jones' career began to focus on Asia in 2005, when he was assigned as Chargé d'Affaires and Deputy Chief of Mission at the U.S. Embassy in Manila, under Ambassador Kristie Kenney. In January 2009, Richard Holbrooke asked Jones to serve as his Deputy Special Representative for Afghanistan and Pakistan. Jones worked intensively with Holbrooke on Afghanistan and Pakistan until assuming his new role as the U.S. Ambassador to Malaysia in September 2010.

=== Ambassador to Malaysia (2010–2013) ===
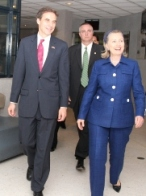
Jones with Secretary Hillary Clinton during her visit to Malaysia in November 2010.

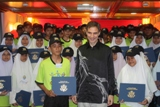
Jones with Click! Camp participants.

Jones was nominated by President Barack Obama for the position of ambassador to Malaysia on July 12, 2010. He was confirmed by the United States Senate on August 5, 2010, and he was sworn in by Secretary of State Hillary Clinton in Washington, D.C., on September 8. Jones arrived in Malaysia on September 13 and presented his Letter of Credence from President Obama to the then King of Malaysia, Sultan Mizan Zainal Abidin, at the Palace on October 18, 2010.

In his role as ambassador, Jones has emphasized strengthening ties between the United States and Malaysia in education and exchanges, science and technology, trade and investment, entrepreneurship, and security. During Jones' tenure, both Secretary of State Clinton and United States Secretary of Defense Robert Gates separately made their first ever visits to Malaysia in November 2010.

=== Return to the United States (2013–2015) ===
After serving as ambassador, Jones returned to the United States joining the U.S. Department of State in the Bureau of European and Eurasian Affairs. He served as the Principle Deputy Assistant Secretary from 2013 to 2015. He was responsible for all aspects of U.S. policy and operations in Europe, particularly Russia and Ukraine. In this role, he was particularly well known for his interest in cooperation among the Arctic nations.

=== Ambassador to Poland (2015–2018) ===
On June 8, 2015, Jones was nominated to serve as the United States Ambassador to Poland. Ambassador Jones had his hearing before the U.S. Senate on July 24, 2015, during which he said, "Poland has become one of our closest allies in NATO." He also stated, "Our partnership is based on democratic values and engagement in politics aimed at peace and social prosperity." U.S. Secretary of State John Kerry swore in Ambassador Jones on September 11, 2015. He arrived in Warsaw, Poland, and began serving as ambassador on September 24, 2015. He left his post on July 28, 2018.

=== Chargé d'Affaires a.i. to the Islamic Republic of Pakistan (2018–2020) ===
Ambassador Paul W. Jones became U.S. Chargé d'Affaires a.i. to Pakistan in September 2018.

== Awards and honors ==
Jones received the Robert C. Frasure Memorial Award for peace building in the southern Philippines in 2008. He is the recipient of the Presidential Meritorious Service Award and several Superior Honor Awards.

== Personal life ==
Jones' mother, Evelyn Hale White Jones, was born in Mumbai, India, to British parents. His father, John Wayne Jones, was born and raised in Missouri and was a veteran of World War II in the Pacific. His great-grandfather was the physician Sir William Hale-White and his great-great-grandfather was the author William Hale White, who wrote under the pen name Mark Rutherford. He is also the nephew of sailor and author Hal Roth. He has two sisters; one is a physician and the other a schoolteacher.

Jones is married to Catherine Jones, an award-winning author and freelance writer, who is the daughter of retired U.S. Ambassador Brandon Grove and Marie Cheremeteff Abernethy. They have two children, Aleksandra and Hale. In addition to English, Jones also speaks Spanish, Russian and some Polish.

== See also ==
- List of ambassadors of the United States

Diplomatic posts
Preceded by James Keith	United States Ambassador to Malaysia; 2010–2013	Succeeded by Joseph Yun
Preceded by Stephen Mull	United States Ambassador to Poland; 2015–2018	Succeeded by Georgette Mosbacher
