= List of ambassadors of the United States to Malaysia =

Ambassador of the United States to Malaysia
- Seal of the United States Department of State

- Flag of a United States ambassador

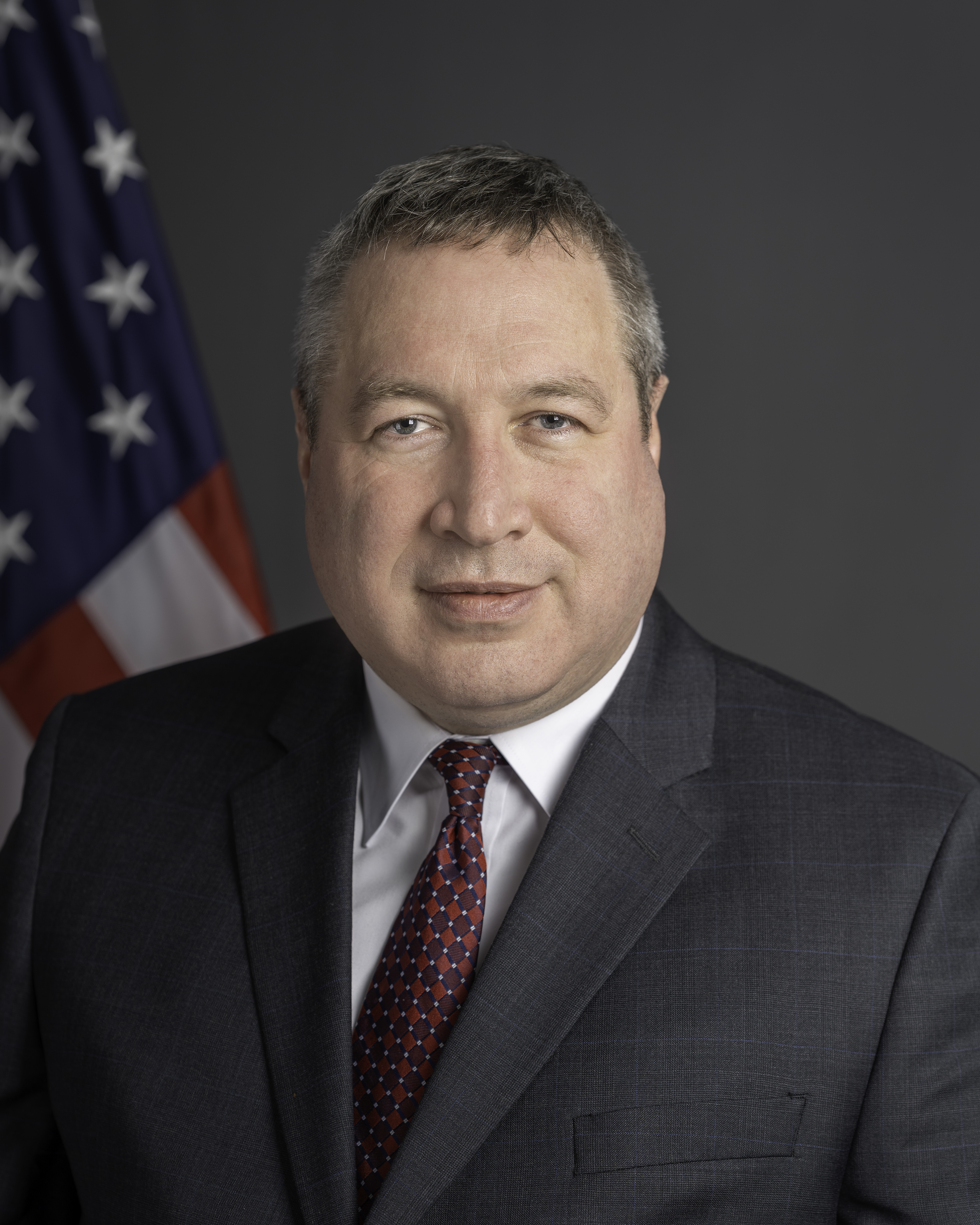
- Incumbent; David Gamble (Chargé d'Affaires, a.i.) since February 24, 2026
- Seat: Kuala Lumpur, Malaysia
- Nominator: The president of the United States
- Appointer: The president with Senate advice and consent
- Inaugural holder: Thomas K. Wright as Chargé d'affaires ad interim
- Formation: August 31, 1957
- Website: my.usembassy.gov

The ambassador of the United States of America to Malaysia is the head of the United States's diplomatic mission to Malaysia. The position has the rank and status of an ambassador extraordinary and plenipotentiary and is based in the Embassy of the United States, Kuala Lumpur.

== List of heads of mission ==
=== Ambassadors to Malaysia ===
Name	Career	Title	Appointment	Presentation of credentials	Termination of mission
Thomas K. Wright (Chargé d'Affaires, a.i.)	Career FSO	Chargé d'Affaires	August 31, 1957	September 4, 1957	Superseded December 2, 1957
Homer M. Byington, Jr.	Career FSO	Ambassador Extraordinary and Plenipotentiary	October 3, 1957	December 2, 1957	Left post, April 1, 1961
Charles F. Baldwin	Career FSO	Ambassador Extraordinary and Plenipotentiary	February 22, 1961	April 29, 1961	Left post, January 22, 1964
James D. Bell	Career FSO	Ambassador Extraordinary and Plenipotentiary	March 4, 1964	March 23, 1964	Left post, July 15, 1969
Jack W. Lydman	Career FSO	Ambassador Extraordinary and Plenipotentiary	September 15, 1969	October 8, 1969	Left post, December 20, 1973
Francis T. Underhill, Jr.	Career FSO	Ambassador Extraordinary and Plenipotentiary	December 19, 1973	February 11, 1974	Left post, May 10, 1977
Robert Hopkins Miller	Career FSO	Ambassador Extraordinary and Plenipotentiary	May 26, 1977	June 8, 1977	Left post, March 8, 1980
Barbara M. Watson	Political appointee	Ambassador Extraordinary and Plenipotentiary	August 20, 1980	September 25, 1980	Left post, March 1, 1981
Ronald DeWayne Palmer	Career FSO	Ambassador Extraordinary and Plenipotentiary	June 11, 1981	June 24, 1981	Left post, October 30, 1983
Thomas P. Shoesmith	Career FSO	Ambassador Extraordinary and Plenipotentiary	November 18, 1983	December 12, 1983	Left post, February 14, 1987
John Cameron Monjo	Career FSO	Ambassador Extraordinary and Plenipotentiary	April 7, 1987	June 10, 1987	Left post, April 22, 1989
Paul Matthews Cleveland	Career FSO	Ambassador Extraordinary and Plenipotentiary	October 10, 1989	November 8, 1989	Left post, July 23, 1992
John Stern Wolf	Career FSO	Ambassador Extraordinary and Plenipotentiary	August 11, 1992	October 7, 1992	Left post, June 10, 1995
John R. Malott	Career FSO	Ambassador Extraordinary and Plenipotentiary	December 19, 1995	January 25, 1996	Left post December 30, 1998
B. Lynn Pascoe	Career FSO	Ambassador Extraordinary and Plenipotentiary	October 22, 1998	March 1, 1999	Left post August 11, 2001
Marie T. Huhtala	Career FSO	Ambassador Extraordinary and Plenipotentiary	August 3, 2001	October 17, 2001	Left post May 28, 2004
Christopher J. LaFleur	Career FSO	Ambassador Extraordinary and Plenipotentiary	October 18, 2004	January 4, 2005	September 14, 2007
James R. Keith	Career FSO	Ambassador Extraordinary and Plenipotentiary	May 30, 2007	December 4, 2007	Left post, March 15, 2010
Paul W. Jones	Career FSO	Ambassador Extraordinary and Plenipotentiary	August 5, 2010	October 18, 2010	July 8, 2013
Joseph Y. Yun	Career FSO	Ambassador Extraordinary and Plenipotentiary	September 12, 2013	October 3, 2013	October 14, 2016
Kamala Shirin Lakhdhir	Career FSO	Ambassador Extraordinary and Plenipotentiary	December 9, 2016	February 21, 2017	January 21, 2021
Brian D. McFeeters	Career FSO	Ambassador Extraordinary and Plenipotentiary	December 22, 2020	February 26, 2021	August 24, 2023
Manu Bhalla (Chargé d'Affaires, a.i.)	Career FSO	Chargé d'Affaires	August 24, 2023		December 19, 2023
Edgard Kagan	Career FSO	Ambassador Extraordinary and Plenipotentiary	November 8, 2023	March 20, 2024	February 15, 2026
David Gamble (Chargé d'Affaires, a.i.)	Career FSO	Chargé d'Affaires	February 24, 2026		Incumbent

- Embassy Kuala Lumpur was established on August 31, 1957, with Wright in charge.

== See also ==
- Malaysia–United States relations
