= Homer M. Byington Jr. =

American diplomat

1st United States Ambassador to Malaya
- In office December 2, 1957 – April 1, 1961
- President: Dwight D. Eisenhower; John F. Kennedy
- Preceded by: Thomas K. Wright (acting)
- Succeeded by: Charles F. Baldwin

Personal details
- Born: Homer Morrison Byington Jr. 1908 Naples, Italy
- Died: November 1, 1987 (aged 78–79) Aboard the Norwegian cruise ship Vistafjord in the Atlantic Ocean
- Spouse: Jane McHarg
- Children: 1 son
- Education: Yale College
- Occupation: Diplomat

Homer Morrison Byington Jr. (born 1908 in Naples, Italy, died November 1, 1987) was the first American Ambassador to newly independent Malaya, now Malaysia, from 1957 to 1961. After he left Malaya, he was Consul General in Naples until he retired.

He graduated from Phillips Academy and Yale College. His father, Homer M. Byington, served in the U.S. consular service for 47 years. He is descended from A. Homer Byington.

Byington was married to Jane McHarg, and they had a son, Homer M. Byington, III. He died of a heart attack while aboard the Norwegian cruise ship Vistafjord in the Atlantic Ocean at the age of 79 years old and had lived in Sotogrande, Spain.

Diplomatic posts
Preceded by Inaugural holder	United States Ambassador to Malaya; 1957–1961	Succeeded by Charles F. Baldwin
