= Waste broker =

A waste broker is someone within the waste industry who acts as intermediary between other wheels-based haulers and truckers. Some services are required to be registered, for example with the UK's Environment Agency, depending on jurisdiction and country of operation.

Waste brokers are a valuable management offering in the waste market. They source, optimise and focus on decreasing waste expenses while increasing resource recovery. Key benefits of using a broker are:

1. unbiased approach to best practice
2. reduced waste to landfill
3. agreements that allow users to change according to their businesses needs.
4. consolidation of sites. Typically one invoice, one point of contact and 1 report.
5. generally spend less, and control frequent price increases

Some brokers focus on commodities, others focus on hazardous waste and remain focused on their niche. Generally brokers can get a better price due to their bulk buying power and established relationships with haulers. Some waste brokers also focus on sustainable packaging, facilities services and even waste equipment.

Waste brokers can simplify the procurement process, while at the same time delivering savings. Brokers make their margins from either buying at a fair rate with a modest mark-up, or focus on implementing cost savings measures and they split the savings with their clients.

Brokers are a consistent point of contact for users to manage all waste streams, all equipment needs, all reporting needs. If haulers have reliability issues, generally brokers are able to have back-up haulers available so as to minimize interruptions.

== Trade broker (a type of waste broker) ==
The client might be a producer of recycled materials, and want to sell them. They will contact a trade broker who performs a similar function. Usually the waste broker is local or at most national, but the trade broker could be arranging shipments between countries.
