= Emil Mosbacher =

American yacht racer

15th Chief of Protocol of the United States
- In office January 21, 1969 – June 30, 1972
- President: Richard Nixon
- Preceded by: Tyler Abell
- Succeeded by: Marion H. Smoak

Personal details
- Born: April 1, 1922 White Plains, New York, U.S.
- Died: August 13, 1997 (aged 75) Greenwich, Connecticut, U.S.
- Relations: Robert Mosbacher Sr. (brother)
- Parent(s): Emil Mosbacher Sr. Gertrude Mosbacher (nee Schwartz)
- Education: Dartmouth College

Emil "Bus" Mosbacher Jr. (April 1, 1922 – August 13, 1997) was a two-time America's Cup-winning yachtsman, the founding chairman of Operation Sail, and Chief of Protocol of the United States during the administration of President Richard Nixon.

== Life and career ==
Mosbacher was born in White Plains, New York. He was the brother of Robert Mosbacher Sr., also a champion yachtsman, and U.S. Secretary of Commerce during the administration of President George Herbert Walker Bush. He was the son of Gertrude (née Schwartz) and Emil Mosbacher Sr., a wealthy stock trader who divested himself of his holdings just before the Wall Street Crash of 1929 and who, as a member of the Knickerbocker Yacht Club, helped formulate specifications for the Interclub class of racing sloops. His family was of German Jewish descent.

"Bus" Mosbacher graduated from The Choate School (now Choate Rosemary Hall) in 1939 and from Dartmouth College in 1943. During World War II, Mosbacher served on a Navy minesweeper in the Pacific. In the 1940s and 1950s he oversaw his family's oil, natural gas and real estate business.

Mosbacher is best known for his yacht racing. In 1962, even before his two America's Cup victories, he was described by Sports Illustrated as "the finest helmsman of our time." As a schoolboy sailor he had been Junior Champion of Long Island Sound sailing an Atlantic, and at Dartmouth he led the sailing team to two Intercollegiate Championships (the McMillan Cup 1941 & 42). During the 1950s he won eight consecutive Long Island Sound season championships in the International One-Design Class, and in 1959 he was Southern Ocean Racing Conference (SORC) champion. In 1958 he and Warner Wilcox founded the Mamaroneck Frostbite Association, for racing 9' Dyer Dhows in winter, in response to discrimination by some of the yacht clubs against having Jewish members. Mosbacher successfully defended the America's Cup in 1962 at Newport, Rhode Island in the sloop Weatherly, and again in 1967 in the 12-metre class yacht Intrepid.

Mosbacher was appointed Chief of Protocol of the United States shortly before President Nixon's inauguration in 1969 and served until 1972. He was founding chairman of Operation Sail, which brought hundreds of tall ships to New York during the United States Bicentennial in 1976. He was also an organizer of Operation Sail events in 1986, marking the centennial of the Statue of Liberty, and 1992, marking the cinquecentennial of Columbus's voyage. His numerous other offices included Commodore of the New York Yacht Club, chairman of the Hoover Institution at Stanford University, and directorships of Chemical Bank, Chubb, Abercrombie & Fitch, and other companies.

Mosbacher died in Greenwich, Connecticut.

== Awards ==
In 1967 Mosbacher received the Martini & Rossi trophy, thereby becoming the United States' sailor of the year along with Betty Foulk. In 1986, he received the Golden Plate Award of the American Academy of Achievement. Mosbacher was elected into the inaugural class of the America's Cup Hall of Fame in 1993 and the inaugural class of the U.S. National Sailing Hall of Fame in 2011.
