= Georgette Mosbacher =

American political activist, businesswoman, & diplomat (born 1947)

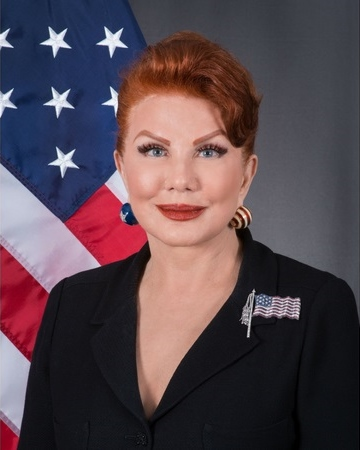
- Official portrait, 2018

United States Ambassador to Poland
- In office September 6, 2018 – January 20, 2021
- President: Donald Trump
- Preceded by: Paul W. Jones
- Succeeded by: Mark Brzezinski

Personal details
- Born: Georgette Paulsin; January 16, 1947 (age 79) Highland, Indiana, U.S.
- Party: Republican
- Spouses: Robert Muir (m. 1972; div. 1977); George Barrie (m. 1979; div. 1982); Robert Mosbacher (m. 1985; div. 1998)
- Education: Indiana University Bloomington
- Awards: Grand Cross of the Order of Merit of the Republic of Poland Ellis Island Medal of Honor

Georgette Mosbacher (née Paulsin; January 16, 1947) is an American business executive, entrepreneur, and political activist who served as the United States Ambassador to Poland from 2018 to 2021. She is the chairman of the Green Beret Foundation advisory board, and a Fox News contributor. On November 19, 2015, President Barack Obama nominated her as a member of the United States Advisory Commission on Public Diplomacy.

Mosbacher started her career as an executive in 1987 when she purchased the struggling cosmetics firm La Prairie, outbidding companies such as Revlon, Avon, and Estee Lauder. After selling La Prairie in 1991 to Beiersdorf for a profit, in the 1990s she founded Georgette Mosbacher Enterprises, her own business and finance consulting company. From 2000 to 2015 she was CEO of Borghese, a cosmetics manufacturer based in New York City. Mosbacher authored two motivational books for women in the 1990s: Feminine Force through Simon & Schuster and It Takes Money Honey through HarperCollins.

Active in American politics, Mosbacher previously was a co-chair of the Republican National Committee’s Finance Committee, and she was the first woman to be general chairperson of the Republican Governors Association. Mosbacher has been noted in the media for her private fundraising events since the 1990s. She was a vital figure in the Bush Quayle '92 campaign, which her then-husband Robert Mosbacher served as general chairman of. After supporting John McCain's bid for senate in 1998, she served as national co-chairman of McCain's 2000 presidential campaign and also anchored fundraising efforts for campaigns such as Bush Cheney '04. Involved with a number of non-profit organizations, in 1995 she founded the New York Center for Children, which aims to assist abused children and their families. A fellow at the Foreign Policy Association, she is a board-member for Business Executives for National Security (BENS) and the Atlantic Council, among other organizations.

On February 14, 2018, President Donald Trump nominated Mosbacher to be Ambassador to the Republic of Poland. On July 12, 2018, her nomination was confirmed by the United States Senate by voice vote. On December 26, 2020, Mosbacher announced her intent to resign, effective January 20, 2021.

== Early life and education ==
A native of Highland, Indiana, Georgette Mosbacher (née Paulsin) was born to Dorothy (Bell) and George Paulsin. Her father died in an automobile accident when she was young, leaving the seven-year-old Georgette and her three younger siblings under the care of their mother, grandmother, and great-grandmother. When her mother returned to work, Mosbacher took on childcare duties for her brother George and two sisters, Melody and Lyn.

Mosbacher attended high school in Highland, Indiana, graduating in 1965. She went on to earn a B.S. in education from Indiana University Bloomington in 1970. As an undergraduate student she worked three jobs in order to fund her education. After graduating from Indiana University, Mosbacher moved to Chicago to take a job at an advertising firm.

== Business career ==
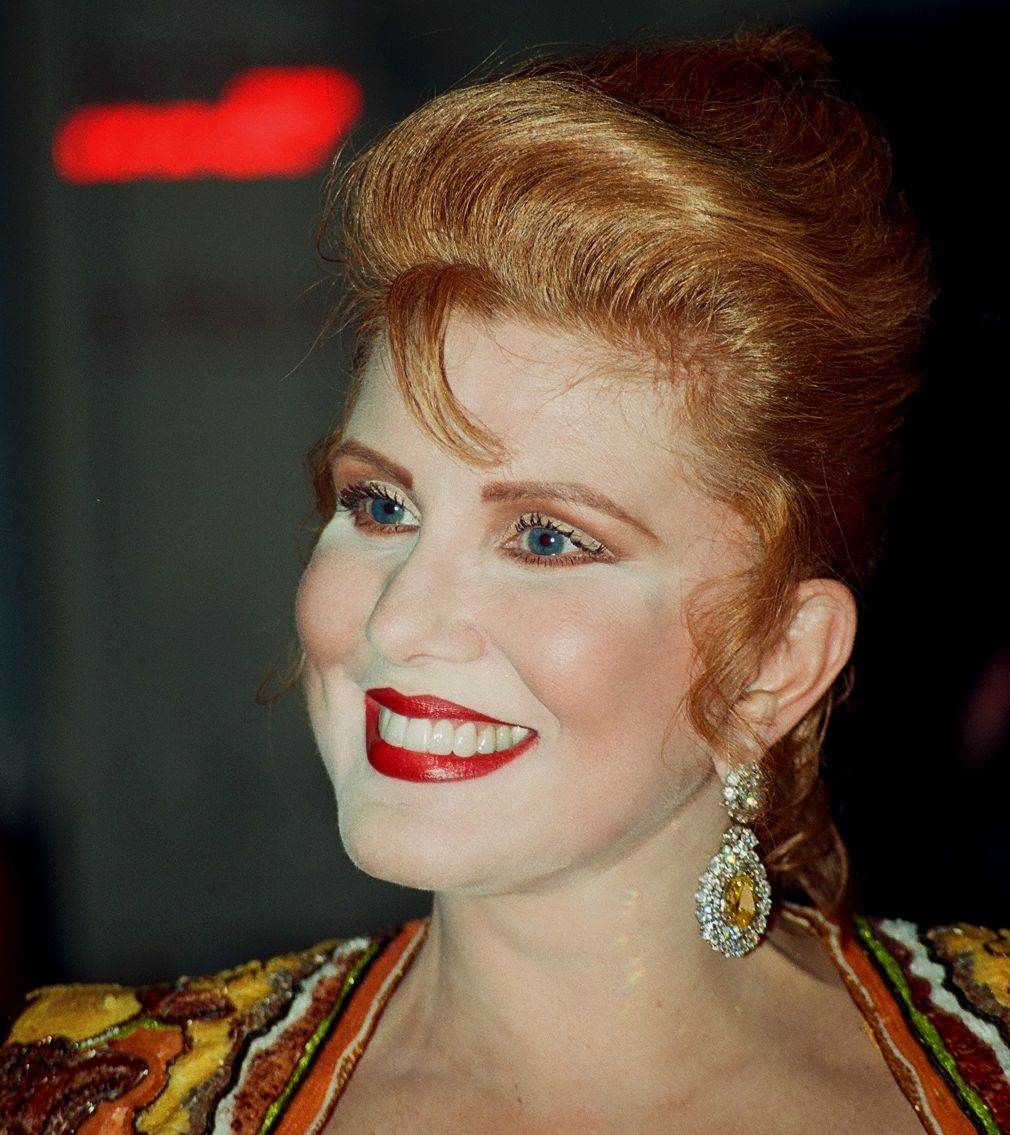
Mosbacher in 1999

Mosbacher purchased the high-end cosmetics firm La Prairie in 1987, outbidding companies such as Revlon, Avon, and Estee Lauder. Despite the fact that La Prairie had been struggling with sales, she had raised the funds for the purchase by pitching to investors and venture capitalists. As primary owner of the Switzerland-based company, she also served as CEO and president for four years. Among other changes, she sold La Prairie in 1991 to Beiersdorf, a large personal care products provider based in Germany.

After selling La Prairie, in the 1990s she founded her own consulting company, Georgette Mosbacher Enterprises. Described as an "international entrepreneurial and consulting business in New York City," she was chairman and CEO. Mosbacher published her first book, the semi-autobiographical and women's motivational guide Feminine Force: Release the Power Within to Create the Life You Deserve, in 1993. Released through Simon & Schuster, it had a foreword by Kathie Lee Gifford. Her second book, It Takes Money Honey: A Get-Smart Guide to Total Financial Freedom, was also partly focused on finances, and was released through HarperCollins in 1998.

After working as a consultant to the company since 1999, in 2000 Mosbacher was appointed chief executive officer of Borghese, a prominent cosmetics manufacturer based in New York City. She also took on the role of president, and by 2006 had been appointed chairwoman. The Borghese brand had first started in the 14th century in Italy, using minerals and ingredients from Tuscany. Upon becoming CEO, she closed half of the line's outlets to retain exclusivity, and reduced the number of items to focus on core products. During her early years at Borghese, she helped the company expand its global operations and establish a wide distribution network in China.

== Political career ==
A longtime Republican, Mosbacher was a co-chair of the Republican National Committee’s Finance Committee, and she has furthermore been involved with the National Republican Senatorial Committee and the New Republican Majority Fund. She was New York State's Republican National Committeewomen for more than a decade, and was also the first woman to be general chairman of the Republican Governors Association, a role she continued to hold as of 2001. Mosbacher was a presidential appointee to the US Advisory Board for Trade Policy and Negotiations, a gubernatorial appointee as a New York Commissioner of Racing, and a mayoral appointee for trustee of the New York Hudson River Park Trust. She has also been involved with the National Women's Economic Alliance. On November 19, 2015, it was announced that President Obama had nominated her to be a member of the United States Advisory Commission on Public Diplomacy.

Mosbacher has been noted in the media for her private fundraising events since the 1990s. During President George H. W. Bush's bid for re-election in 1992, which her then-husband Robert chaired, Mosbacher was more visibly active, even using her blush products to aid fundraising efforts. after supporting John McCain's bid for senate in 1998, she was national co-chairman of McCain's 2000 presidential campaign. Mosbacher also anchored fundraising efforts for Bush Cheney '04, John McCain 2008, George W. Bush for president, John Ashcroft 2000, John McCain 2008, and McCain-Palin Victory 2008. Other American politicians she has fundraised for include Fred Thompson, Dick Lugar, Rudy Giuliani, Roy Blunt, Mitt Romney, and David Dreier.

On February 12, 2018 President Donald Trump nominated her for a position of United States Ambassador to Poland to replace Paul W. Jones. On July 12, 2018, her nomination was confirmed in the United States Senate by voice vote.

== In the media ==
In relation to both business and politics, Mosbacher has lent her opinions and personal anecdotes to several radio and television programs, including CNN’s Pinnacle, The Today Show, Larry King Live, Fox Business, C-SPAN, and This Weekend with Lou Dobbs. She has also been interviewed by publications such as Small Business Advocate and the Wall Street Journal, and a number of her op-eds have been published in publications such as the Washington Times and Financial Times, covering topics such as health care for war veterans. While she generally takes a Republican standpoint in relation to political issues, she has at times expressed frustration with Republican candidates and politicians, for example over incidents such as Congress stalling the vote on aid for Hurricane Sandy in 2012. She also has appeared on Bravo Television series Southern Charm as Patricia Altschul's best friend, and partner in her customized dog caftan business.

== Charity work and boards ==
For several decades, Mosbacher has been involved with a number of non-profit organizations. In 1995 she founded the Children's Advocacy Center of Manhattan (CAC), currently known as the New York Center for Children, which aims to assist abused children and their families. She is a trustee of several charitable and civic organizations, including the Hudson River Park Trust and the New York Racing Association. Mosbacher has also received appointments from the M.D. Anderson Hospital Cancer Center and is on the board of the Intrepid Fallen Heroes Fund. Through her own charitable foundation, Mosbacher provides two annual scholarships for women in the MBA program at Indiana University, her alma mater.

She was elected to the board of directors of the information commerce company Intelius in October 2009, and is also on the boards of the Atlantic Council, the Intrepid Sea, Air & Space Museum, and has been on the advisory boards of Brasilinvest, RUSI International, and the Dilenschneider Group. A fellow at the Foreign Policy Association, she is a board-member for the International Institute for Strategic Studies. Mosbacher has been on the board of advisors for Diligence London, Harvard Center For Public Leadership, Gow & Partners LLC, Grupo Brasilinvest S.A., and Village Cares. She is a chairman of the Green Beret Foundation and a board-member for Business Executives for National Security (BENS) and the Atlantic Council, among other organizations.

== Awards and recognition ==
Georgette Mosbacher has received several awards throughout her career, including the Ellis Island Medal of Honor, the Entrepreneurial Woman of the Year Award from the American Women's Economic Development Corporation, the Distinguished Humanitarian Award from Brandeis University, and the Outstanding Business Leader Award from the Northwood Institute. In 2002, the National Republican Congressional Committee's (NRCC) Business Advisory Council awarded Mosbacher with their National Leadership Award, in part citing her activism relating to small business issues. In March 2015, Mosbacher was given the Founder's Award from Hedge Funds Care "in recognition of her efforts spearheading the Manhattan Children’s Advocacy Center." She holds a Doctor of Business Administration Honorary Causa from Bryant College and an honorary doctorate from the International Fine Arts College.

On January 12, 2021 President of Poland Andrzej Duda decorated her with 1st class Order of Merit of the Republic of Poland, the order was awarded "in recognition of outstanding achievements in developing Polish-American friendly relations and cooperation, and for involvement in activities for international security."

== Personal life ==
Based in Manhattan, in the 1970s Mosbacher was married to Robert Muir, and after their divorce in 1977, for a time was married to George Barrie, the CEO of Fabergé and Brut Productions. On March 1, 1985, she married Robert Mosbacher, moving to Houston. In 1989 President, George H. W. Bush appointed Robert Mosbacher to the position of United States Secretary of Commerce. On June 12, 1990, she was robbed at gun point in front of her hotel room at the Barbizon Plaza in Manhattan (now Trump Parc). She dove into an elevator, the door of which unexpectedly opened, rang the alarm and rode it to the ground floor; the gunman vanished with her jewelry and handbag. After 13 years of marriage, Georgette Mosbacher and her husband divorced in 1998. In 2017, she gave a brief video tour of her Fifth Avenue home, discussing her many distinguished guests at parties there, on the NBC television series Open House.

== Controversies ==
Mosbacher courted controversy when she suggested that Poland was responsible for the re-emergence of anti-Semitism across the continent of Europe because of a law which criminalizes blaming Poland for the actions of Nazi Germany on its soil during the Holocaust.

Prior to being appointed, Polish President Andrzej Duda stated that if Mosbacher were appointed as the new U.S. ambassador to Poland, she would be accepted, despite having made "unnecessary and mistaken" comments about the country.

== Publishing history ==
Books authored by Georgette Mosbacher
Year	Release title	Publisher	ISBN, notes
1993	Feminine Force: Release The Power Within To Create The Life You Deserve	Simon & Schuster	ISBN 0-671-79896-0
1998	It Takes Money, Honey: A Get-Smart Guide to Total Financial Freedom	HarperCollins	ISBN 0-06-039236-3

== See also ==
- List of chief executive officers
- List of female top executives
- List of entrepreneurs

Diplomatic posts
Preceded by Paul W. Jones	United States Ambassador to Poland; 2018–2021	Succeeded by B. Bix Aliu; Chargé d'Affaires
