= Robert Mosbacher =

American politician (1927–2010)

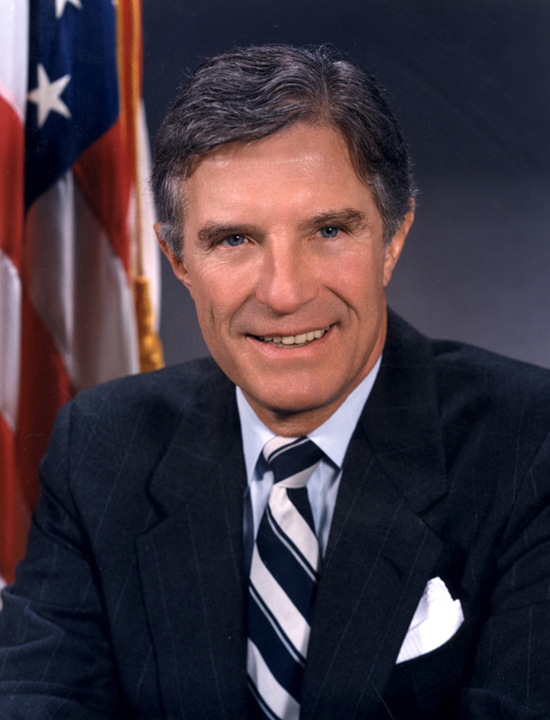

28th United States Secretary of Commerce
- In office January 31, 1989 – January 15, 1992
- President: George H. W. Bush
- Preceded by: William Verity
- Succeeded by: Barbara Franklin

Personal details
- Born: Robert Adam Mosbacher; March 11, 1927 Mount Vernon, New York, U.S.
- Died: January 24, 2010 (aged 82) Houston, Texas, U.S.
- Party: Republican
- Spouses: Jane Pennybacker (m. 1946; died 1970); Sandra Smith Gerry (m. 1973; div. 1982) Georgette Paulsin (m. 1985; div. 1998) Mica McCutchen Duncan (m. 2000)
- Children: 4, (including Dee and Robert)
- Education: Washington and Lee University (BA)

Robert Adam Mosbacher Sr. (March 11, 1927 – January 24, 2010) was an American businessman, accomplished yacht racer, and a Republican politician. A longtime friend and political ally of George H. W. Bush, Mosbacher served in Bush's Cabinet as Secretary of Commerce from 1989 to 1992.

== Early life ==
Mosbacher was born in Mount Vernon, New York, to Gertrude (née Schwartz) and Emil Mosbacher. His grandparents were German Jewish immigrants. He had a sister, Barbara, and a brother, Emil Mosbacher Jr., a two-time America's Cup-winning yachtsman and former Presidential Chief of Protocol. Mosbacher had a colorful childhood, growing up around characters like George Gershwin, a friend of his father. After graduation from The Choate School, he went to Texas as a wildcatter. He befriended future president George H. W. Bush in Texas.

== Sailing career ==
Robert Mosbacher
Medal record

World Championships
Gold medal – first place	1971 Oyster Bay	Soling
Bronze medal – third place	1985 Newport Beach	5.5m

Sailing as a member of the Knickerbocker Yacht Club, Mosbacher led the team that won the Scoville Cup and the Midget Yacht championship for under-15 racers in 1940 on Long Island Sound. He went on to win the Southern Ocean Racing Conference championship in 1958 and the Mallory Cup, also in 1958. Mosbacher later appeared on the cover of Sports Illustrated, on May 18, 1959, with his brother Bus Mosbacher, for a feature article titled Kings of the Class-Boat Sailors.

Mosbacher won the silver medal in World Championships Dragon class in 1967 in Toronto. In 1969, he won the gold medal in World Championships Dragon class at Palma de Mallorca by one point. As of 2010, he was still only one of two Americans to have ever won the World Championships in the Dragon class.

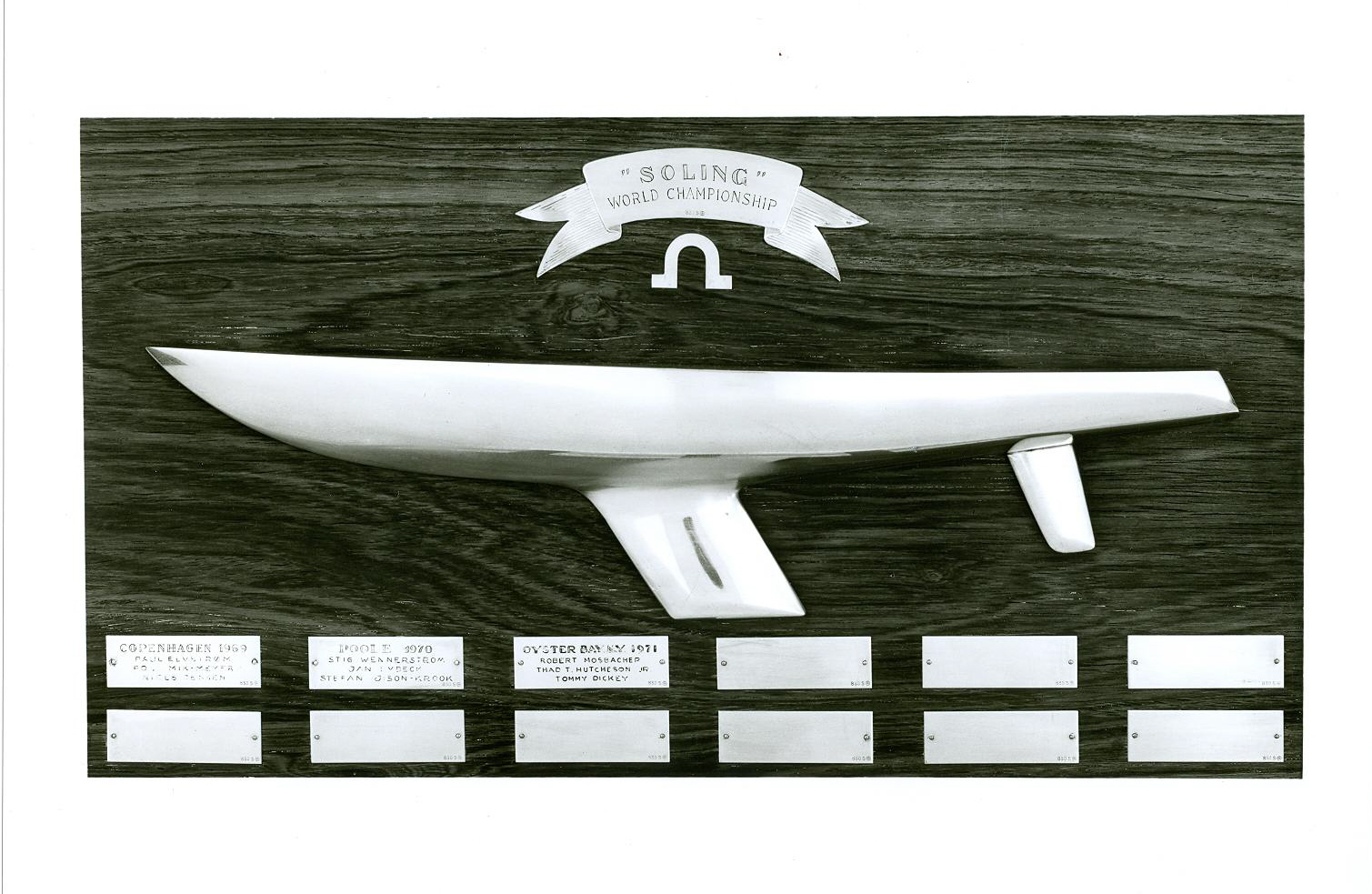
Soling World Championship 1971

He won the gold medal in World Championships Soling class in 1971 in Oyster Bay, NY, on a boat named "Adlez" built by Abbott with rigging from Melges. He lost to Buddy Melges in the 1972 Olympic Trials (Soling class) in San Francisco Bay. Buddy Melges went on to win the Gold Medal in the Soling Class at the 1972 Summer Olympics in Germany. Mosbacher won the bronze medal in World Championships 5.5 metre class in 1985 at Newport Beach. In 1988, he won the Scandinavian Gold Cup for 5.5 metre yachts.

He was described in Stuart H. Walker's book Advanced Racing Tactics as a keenly competitive racer "unwilling to settle for second".

Mosbacher participated in a semi-final match race against Ted Turner in the Mallory Cup in 1960. On the final windward leg, Mosbacher was slightly ahead. Ted Turner attempted to force Mosbacher into a mistake by executing a grueling tacking duel. The windward leg involved fifty-two tacks. In the end, Mosbacher won by five seconds.

== Political career ==
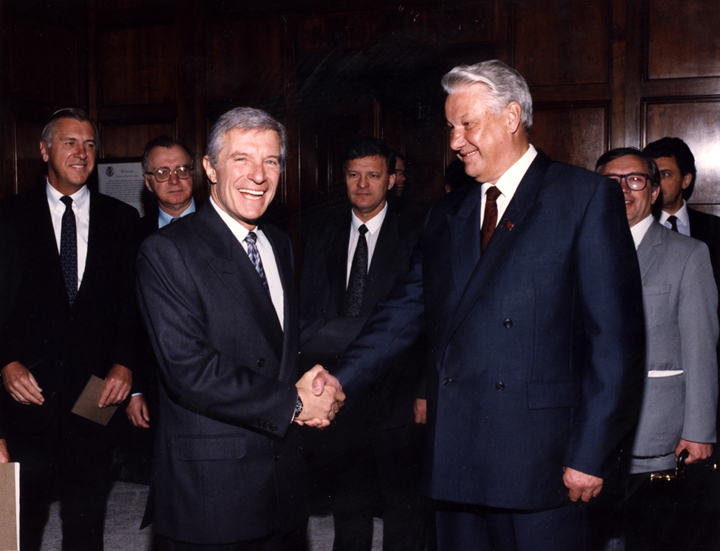
Robert Adam Mosbacher shaking hands with Boris Yeltsin

Mosbacher was the finance chairman of Gerald Ford's failed election bid in 1976. He also lost his own race for delegate to the 1976 Republican National Convention in Kansas City, Missouri, to a slate backing Ronald Reagan, Ford's rival for the party nomination. Mosbacher, running in the then 7th congressional district, lost to State Senator Walter Mengden of Houston, 39,276 to 26,344 votes.

Earlier, Mosbacher in 1970 headed the fund-raising effort for George H. W. Bush in his losing Senate campaign against Lloyd M. Bentsen and again in Bush's presidential campaigns in 1980 and 1988. In 1992, he would serve as the general chairman of Bush's re-election campaign.

As U.S. Secretary of Commerce, he was the principal Cabinet official responsible for initiating the North American Free Trade Agreement (NAFTA). He was a strong proponent of the agreement, which created the largest unified market in the world. The agreement was not signed into law in the U.S. until December 8, 1993, during the administration of President Bill Clinton. The agreement went into effect on January 1, 1994.

Mosbacher was a member of President Reagan's Task Force on Private Sector Initiatives 1981–83 and vice chairman of the board of trustees of the Woodrow Wilson International Center for Scholars. He then became Secretary of Commerce in 1989 after he directed the George H. W. Bush 1988 Presidential Election Campaign. He also served as a director of the Center for Strategic and International Studies. In 2008, he was the general chairman of John McCain's bid for the White House.

== Business interests ==
Mosbacher was a charter member and past chairman of the All American Wildcatters Association and served on the board of directors and executive committee of the American Petroleum Institute. He was a former director of Texas Commerce Bank and also of New York Life Insurance Company. Mosbacher was a former president of the American Association of Petroleum Landmen and a former chairman of the Mid-Continent Oil and Gas Association.

In 1989, Mosbacher received an honorary doctoral degree from the University of Houston. He was trustee emeritus of the Aspen Institute for Humanistic Studies and president of the board of Odyssey Academy, a public charter school located in Galveston, Texas.

== Mosbacher Institute ==
The Mosbacher Institute for Trade, Economics, and Public Policy was founded in October 2009 upon the request of President George H.W. Bush to honor Mosbacher.

== Family and personal life ==
Mosbacher's brother was Emil "Bus" Mosbacher Jr., who successfully defended the America's Cup as skipper of the Weatherly in 1962 and again in 1967 as skipper of the Intrepid.

Mosbacher was married four times:

- In 1946, he married Jane Pennybacker. Born Jewish, Mosbacher converted to Pennybacker's Presbyterian religion. They had four children: Diane "Dee" Mosbacher, Robert Mosbacher Jr., Kathryn Mosbacher, and Lisa Mosbacher Mears. The marriage ended upon his wife's death from leukemia in 1970.
- His marriage to Sandra Smith Gerry ended in divorce in 1982.
- In 1985, he married Georgette Paulsin, herself twice previously married. They divorced in 1998.
- His last marriage of 10 years to Michele "Mica" Mosbacher (Mica McCutchen Duncan) ended with his death.

Mosbacher's eldest daughter Diane "Dee" Mosbacher is a psychiatrist and lesbian activist. In 1992, Robert Mosbacher Sr. was the first Republican Campaign Chair to meet with leaders from the National Lesbian Gay Task Force. His son, Robert Mosbacher Jr., is a businessman, public servant, and a former Republican politician.

=== Death ===
On January 24, 2010, Mosbacher died of pancreatic cancer at the University of Texas M. D. Anderson Cancer Center at the age of 82. He is buried at the Congressional Cemetery in Washington, D.C.

== See also ==
- List of Jewish United States Cabinet members

Political offices
Preceded by William Verity	United States Secretary of Commerce; 1989–1992	Succeeded by Barbara Franklin
