= Charles Saltzman =

Charles Saltzman may refer to:

- Charles McKinley Saltzman (1871–1942), American general
- Charles E. Saltzman (1903–1994), his son, American soldier, businessman and State Department official
