= Mary Knowlton von Francken-Sierstorpff =

American socialite (1870–1929)

- Born: Mary Carpenter Knowlton; 2 July 1870; Brooklyn, New York, U.S.
- Died: 21 July 1929 (aged 59); Berlin, Germany
- Spouse: Count Johannes von Francken-Sierstorpff (m. 1892; died 1917)
- Children: 2
- Parent(s): Ella Carpenter Knowlton; Edwin Franklin Knowlton

Countess Mary Carpenter Knowlton von Francken-Sierstorpff (2 July 1870 – 21 July 1929) was an American socialite who married a German count.

== Early life ==
Mary Carpenter Knowlton was born in Brooklyn on 2 July 1870, and lived at 201 Columbia Heights, the former home of former mayor Seth Low. She was the only child of Ella (née Carpenter) Knowlton (1841–1878) and Edwin Franklin Knowlton (1834–1898), a straw goods manufacturer.

Her paternal grandfather, William Knowlton, a Massachusetts State Senator who was the founder of William Knowlton & Sons, a straw goods manufacturer in Upton, Massachusetts. Mary was a member of the Colonial Dames of America by her descent from several ancestors who lived in British America, including William Ward, a Colonel in the Massachusetts Militia.

Mary was educated at the Ladies' Seminary in Farmington, Connecticut.

=== Society life ===
In February 1892, shortly before her marriage, the unmarried Miss Knowlton was included in Ward McAllister's "Four Hundred", purported to be an index of New York's best families, published in The New York Times. Conveniently, 400 was the number of people that could fit into Mrs. Astor's ballroom. After her marriage, she continued to be listed on the Social Register.

== Personal life ==
After meeting in Newport, Rhode Island in 1890, Mary was married to Count Johannes von Francken-Sierstorpff (1858–1917) in April 1892. At the time of their marriage, she was reportedly worth $750,000 in her own right and heiress to another $2,000,000. Count Johannes was educated at Berne University Together, they lived at Zyrowa Palace in Silesia (a historical region of Central Europe located mostly in Poland, with small parts in the Czech Republic and Germany) where they entertained many prominent people including the Kaiser Wilhelm II and Minister Charlemagne Tower in 1911, and the Ambassador James W. Gerard in 1914. They were the parents of:

- Count Edwin von Francken-Sierstorpff (1893–1915), a member of the Imperial Hussars who died in France during World War I.
- Count Hans Clemens von Francken-Sierstorpff (1895–1944), who married Princess Elisabeth zu Hohenlohe-Öhringen (1896–1975), the granddaughter of Prince Hugo zu Hohenlohe-Öhringen, a politician and mining industrialist. Hans "fled Hitler's Germany, leaving his wife, a Nazi sympathizer, and their grown children behind" and married Clotilde Knapp (1908–2004) in 1942. After his death, his widow remarried to American Under Secretary of State for Administration Charles E. Saltzman.

During World War I, A. Mitchell Palmer, the Alien Property Custodian took over the trust funds of various women of American families who had married Germans and Austrians, and their descendants, including Mary and Countess Gladys Vanderbilt Széchenyi.

Mary died in Berlin, Germany on 21 July 1929. Her son inherited the income from a $1,200,000 Knowlton Trust created by her father. Her will directed that "the chief heir of the family lands and fortunes over which she has power of disposition shall be the eldest son of her son or, if he has no son, to his eldest daughter."

=== Descendants ===
Through her son's first marriage, she was the grandmother of Count Edwin Graf von Francken-Sierstorpff, Countess Constance Gräfin von Francken-Sierstorpff (who married Count Hyazinth Stachwitz in 1943, and after their divorce in 1945, married William D. Denson in 1949 following his military service as a U.S. Chief Prosecutor for War Crimes committed in the Dachau concentration camps during WWII), and Countess Elisabeth Christine von Francken-Sierstorpff. From his second marriage, she was the posthumous grandmother to Michael M. Sierstorpff.
