= John W. Rogers =

John W. Rogers may refer to:

- John W. Rogers (horse trainer) (1852–1908), American racehorse trainer
- John F. W. Rogers (born 1956), American businessman
- John W. Rogers Jr. (born 1958), American investor
