= Jason S. Evans =

American businessman and politician (born 1964)

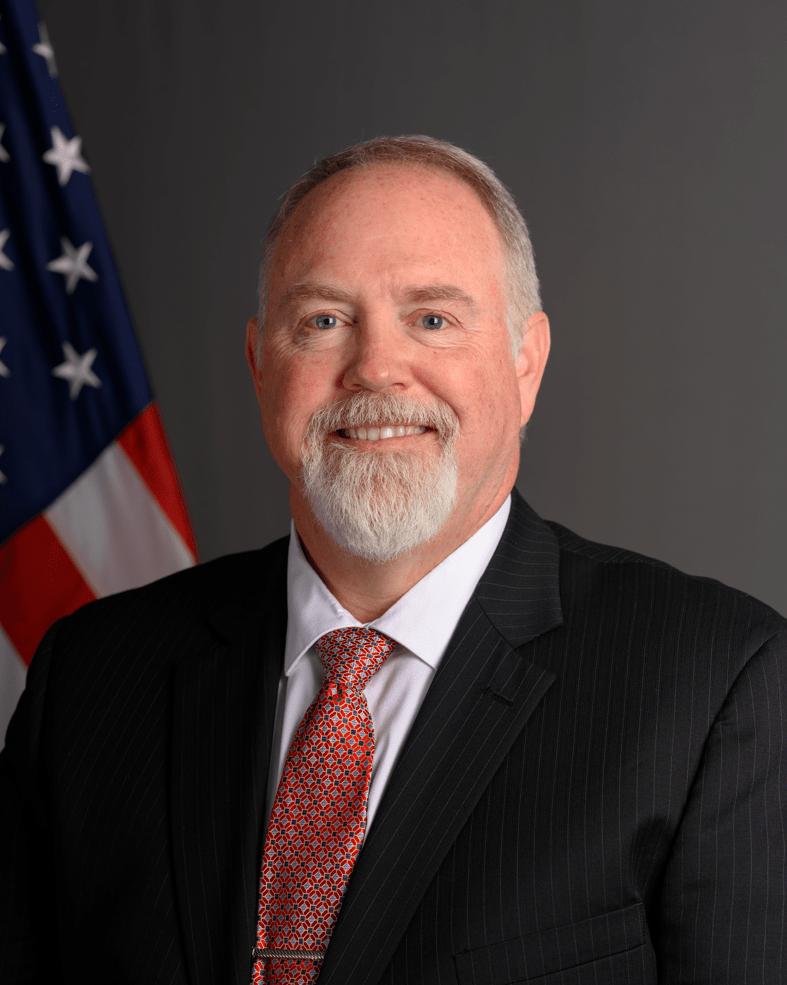
- Jason Evans, 2025

17th Under Secretary of State for Management
- Incumbent
- Assumed office September 22, 2025
- President: Donald Trump
- Preceded by: John R. Bass

Personal details
- Education: Oklahoma State University; National War College

Jason S. Evans is an American foreign service officer and government official. Since 2025 he has served as Under Secretary of State for Management at the U.S. State Department.

== Early life and education ==
Evans is a graduate of Oklahoma State University.

== Career ==
Evans is a career member of the Foreign Service. In May 2025, President Donald Trump nominated Evans to be Under Secretary of State. His nomination was confirmed along a party-line vote on September 18, 2025.
