= Edwin Dorn =

American political scientist (born 1945)

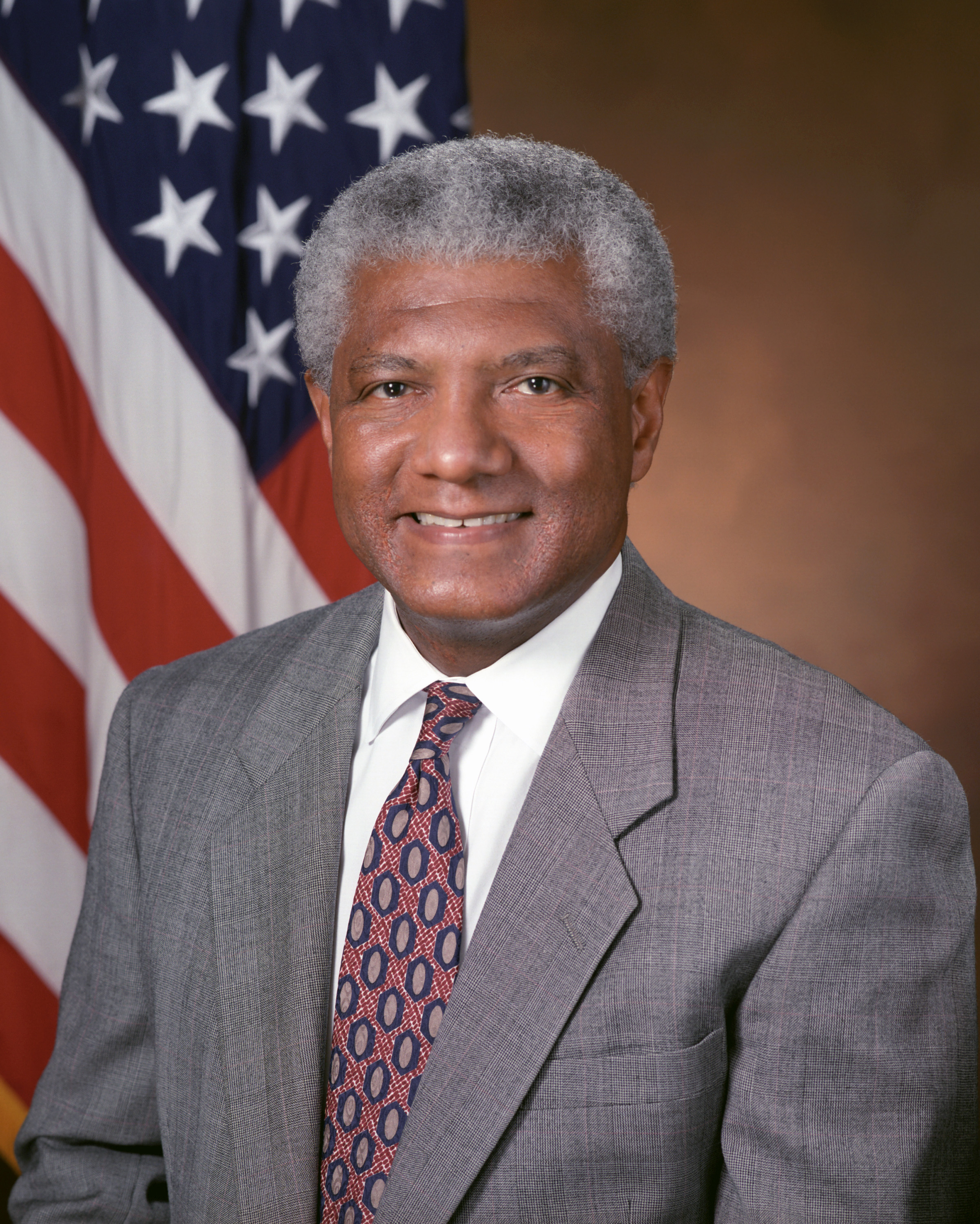
- Edwin Dorn in August 1996

Dean of the Lyndon B. Johnson School of Public Affairs
- In office July 1997 – January 2005
- Preceded by: Max R. Sherman
- Succeeded by: Bobby R. Inman

Under Secretary of Defense for Personnel and Readiness
- In office 16 March 1994 – 7 July 1997
- Preceded by: Position established
- Succeeded by: Rudy de Leon

Assistant Secretary of Defense for Force Management and Personnel
- In office 2 July 1993 – 16 March 1994
- Preceded by: Christopher Jehn
- Succeeded by: Frederick F. Y. Pang

Personal details
- Born: 26 March 1945 (age 81) Crockett, Texas
- Education: University of Texas (BA); Indiana University (MA); Yale University (PhD)

Military service
- Allegiance: United States
- Branch/service: United States Army
- Years of service: 1970–1972
- Rank: Captain

Edwin Dorn (born 26 March 1945) is a political scientist who served as dean of the Lyndon B. Johnson School of Public Affairs from July 1997 to December 2004. He previously served as Under Secretary of Defense for Personnel and Readiness from March 1994 to July 1997. Also in 1994, Dorn was elected as a fellow of the National Academy of Public Administration.

== Early life and education ==
Born in Crockett, Texas, Dorn graduated from Jack Yates High School in Houston in June 1963. He earned a B.A. degree in government from the University of Texas at Austin in June 1967, an M.A. degree in political science from Indiana University Bloomington in January 1970 and a Ph.D. degree in political science from Yale University in June 1978. His doctoral thesis was entitled Rules and Racial Equality. Dorn also studied at the Centre of West African Studies in Birmingham, England from September 1967 to May 1968 under a Fulbright Fellowship.

== Career ==
After completing his master's degree, Dorn served as a United States Army intelligence officer in Frankfurt, West Germany. After completing his active duty commitment, he began his doctoral studies at Yale in September 1972.

In 1977, Dorn began working for the Department of Health, Education and Welfare while completing his doctoral dissertation. In 1980, he moved to the Department of Education. In March 1982, Dorn joined the Joint Center for Political and Economic Studies as a senior researcher and later became deputy director of research. In August 1990, he became a senior staff member in the Center for Public Policy Education at The Brookings Institution.

In April 1993, President Bill Clinton nominated Dorn to be Assistant Secretary of Defense for Force Management and Personnel. In January 1994, he was nominated to be the first Under Secretary of Defense for Personnel and Readiness.

After leaving government service, Dorn served as dean of the LBJ School of Public Affairs from July 1997 to December 2004. He then remained at the school as a professor of public affairs.

== Personal ==
Dorn is the son of Edgar and Mary Dorn.

Dorn married actress Franchella Nadine Stewart on 1 August 1970. They have three daughters. Franchelle Stewart Dorn is a professor of acting in the Department of Theatre and Dance, College of Fine Arts, University of Texas at Austin.
