= Ivan Selin =

American scholar

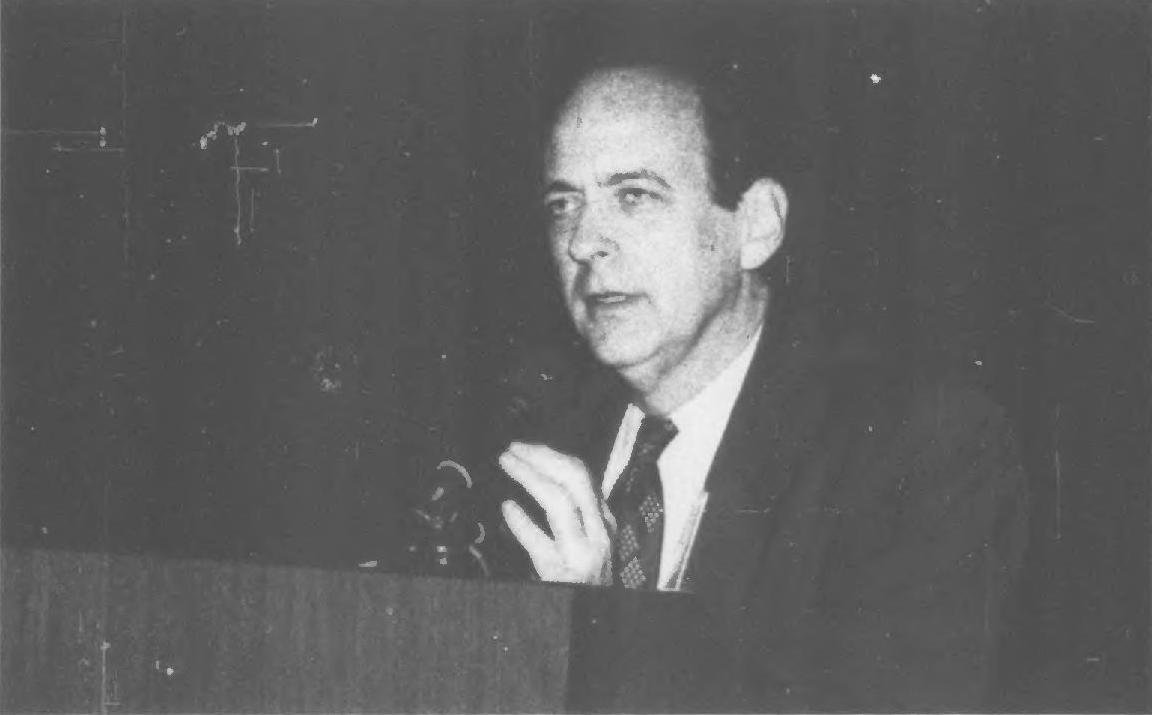
- Selin in 1990

Chairman of the Nuclear Regulatory Commission
- In office July 1, 1991 – June 30, 1995
- President: George H. W. Bush; Bill Clinton
- Preceded by: Kenneth Monroe Carr
- Succeeded by: Shirley Ann Jackson

7th Under Secretary of State for Management
- In office May 23, 1989 – June 30, 1991
- President: George H. W. Bush
- Preceded by: Ronald I. Spiers
- Succeeded by: John F. W. Rogers

Personal details
- Born: March 11, 1937 (age 89) New York City, New York, U.S.
- Education: Yale University (PhD); University of Paris (Sc.D.)
- Occupation: Businessman, former civil servant
- Awards: Distinguished Civilian Service Medal (1970); Secretary's Distinguished Service Award (1991)

Ivan Selin (born March 11, 1937) is an American businessman, and former chairman of the Nuclear Regulatory Commission and Under Secretary of State for Management. Selin is a Fulbright Scholar and graduate of Yale University (PhD, Electrical Engineering, 1960) and University of Paris (Doctor of Science, Mathematics, 1962). He was born in New York City.

== Early career ==
From 1960 to 1965, Selin was a research engineer at the RAND Corporation, working on national security issues and statistical communication theory. In 1965, Selin went to work for the Office of the Secretary of Defense, one of Robert S. McNamara's Whiz Kids. From 1965 to 1970, Selin worked for McNamara, becoming Acting Assistant Secretary of Defense for Systems Analysis by the end of that period. In this capacity, Selin represented the Office of the Secretary of Defense at the commissioning of the USS Knox (FF-1052). He received the Department of Defense Distinguished Civilian Service Medal in 1970.

In 1970, Selin and several DOD colleagues co-founded American Management Systems, a technology and management consulting firm. Selin was chief executive officer from the company's founding to the late 1980s.

Selin was chairman of the Military Economic Advisory Panel to the Director of Central Intelligence (1978–1989); member (1979–1989) and chairman (1988–1989) of the board of governors of the United Nations Association-USA; member of the advisory board on the USSR and Eastern Europe at the National Academy of Sciences (1986–88); and member of the Council on Foreign Relations (1979–present).

== Later public service ==
Selin was Under Secretary of State for Management from May 23, 1989, to June 30, 1991. He received the Secretary of State's Distinguished Service Award in 1991.

Selin was chairman of the Nuclear Regulatory Commission, from July 1991 until he resigned in June 1995. Selin was founding chairman of the board of the Smithsonian Institution's National Museum of American History.

He received the Pentagon's Distinguished Civilian Service medal in 1970.

Government offices
| Preceded by Ronald I. Spiers | Under Secretary of State for Management; May 23, 1989 – June 23, 1991 | Succeeded by John F.W. Rogers |
