= William H. Brubeck =

2nd Executive Secretary of the United States Department of State
- In office May 14, 1962 – July 20, 1963
- President: John F. Kennedy
- Preceded by: Lucius D. Battle
- Succeeded by: Benjamin H. Read

Personal details
- Born: August 19, 1920 Hannibal, Missouri, U.S.
- Died: April 25, 1991 (aged 70) Montisi, San Giovanni d'Asso, Siena, Tuscany, Italy
- Profession: Government official

William H. Brubeck (August 19, 1920 – April 25, 1991) was an American government official who served as the 2nd Executive Secretary of the United States Department of State from 1962 to 1963 during the John F. Kennedy administration.

== Life and career ==
Brubeck was born in Hannibal, Missouri on August 19, 1920.

During the early 1960s, Brubeck served as Special Assistant to Secretary of State, Dean Rusk, and as a member of the National Security Council staff.

On May 14, 1962, President John F. Kennedy appointed Brubeck as the Executive Secretary of the United States Department of State, succeeding Lucius D. Battle. As Executive Secretary, he played a key administrative role in coordinating foreign policy memos and intelligence updates for the Secretary of State and the White House during major Cold War events, including the Cuban Missile Crisis. He held this position until July 20, 1963, when he was succeeded by Benjamin H. Read.

Brubeck died on April 25, 1991, at the age of 70, in Montisi, San Giovanni d'Asso, in the province of Siena, Tuscany, Italy.
