= Jerome W. Van Gorkom =

American lawyer

5th Under Secretary of State for Management
- In office December 22, 1982 – October 14, 1983
- President: Ronald Reagan
- Preceded by: Richard T. Kennedy
- Succeeded by: Ronald I. Spiers

Personal details
- Born: August 6, 1917 Denver, Colorado
- Died: March 17, 1998 (aged 80) Lake Forest, Illinois
- Party: Republican
- Spouse: Betty Jean (nee Alexander)
- Children: 2
- Education: University of Illinois (BS, JD)

Jerome William Van Gorkom (August 6, 1917 – March 17, 1998) was a United States businessman who was U.S. Under Secretary of State for Management 1982–83. He was the CEO of TransUnion for eighteen years. Van Gorkom is probably best known as the named defendant in the landmark corporate law case of Smith v. Van Gorkom, 488 A.2d 858 (Supreme Court of Delaware 1985), which involved the merger of TransUnion with the Marmon Group in 1980.

== Biography ==
Jerome W. Van Gorkom was born in Denver, Colorado. He was educated at the University of Illinois at Urbana–Champaign, receiving a Bachelor of Science in 1939. He then attended the University of Illinois College of Law, receiving a Juris Doctor in 1941.

After law school, Van Gorkom became an officer in the United States Navy Reserve, until the end of World War II in 1945. After the war, Van Gorkom became an associate attorney at the Chicago law firm of Kix, Miller, Baar & Morris. He stayed there only two years, leaving in 1947 to become an accountant at Arthur Andersen. He became a partner at Arthur Andersen in 1954.

In 1956, Van Gorkom joined TransUnion, the third largest credit bureau in the United States, as comptroller. He later was TransUnion's chief executive officer from 1962 to 1980. In September 1980, in a move that would later prove highly controversial, Van Gorkom contacted Jay Pritzker and offered to merge TransUnion with the Marmon Group, a company controlled by Pritzker, with the Marmon Group acquiring TransUnion at a price of $55/share.

In January 1980, Van Gorkom became president of the Chicago School Finance Authority, a body newly created by the Government of Illinois to turn around the Chicago Public Schools, which were running a $94 million annual operating deficit. In this capacity, Van Gorkom was widely credited with turning around the schools' finances.

In September 1982, President of the United States Ronald Reagan nominated Van Gorkom as Under Secretary of State for Management and, after Senate confirmation, Van Gorkom held this office from December 22, 1982, until October 14, 1983.

In the meantime, the case of Smith v. Van Gorkom, a class action suit brought on behalf of TransUnion shareholders, was winding its way through the courts. The lawsuit claimed that Van Gorkom and the board of directors of TransUnion had violated their fiduciary duty to shareholders in recommending the acquisition of TransUnion by the Marmon Group at the price of $55/share. On July 6, 1982, the Delaware Court of Chancery ruled in favor of Van Gorkom and the TransUnion directors, finding that their actions were protected by the business judgment rule. The Supreme Court of Delaware overruled this decision on January 29, 1985, holding that the directors were grossly negligent, because they quickly approved the merger without substantial inquiry or any expert advice. For this reason, the board of directors breached the duty of care that it owed to the corporation's shareholders. As such, the protection of the business judgment rule was unavailable. This decision sent shockwaves through the U.S. business community, and led to directors and officers liability insurance becoming much more expensive. Daniel Fischel criticized the Smith v. Van Gorkom opinion as "one of the worst decisions in the history of corporate law." Van Gorkom, previously a well-liked member of the Chicago business community, was criticized in some quarters for his performance in negotiating the merger of TransUnion.

In the course of his career, Van Gorkom was on the board of directors of thirteen corporations, including the Chicago Board of Trade, IC Industries, and the Inland Steel Company. He spent three years as chairman of the Securities Investor Protection Corporation. He was also active in the non-profit sector, as chairman of the Lyric Opera of Chicago; a trustee of the University of Notre Dame; a director of the Council on Foreign Relations; a trustee of the Michael Reese Hospital; and a fundraiser for Catholic Charities.

Van Gorkom lived in Lake Forest, Illinois, for forty years. He received an honorary doctorate from Lake Forest College in 1988. Van Gorkom died in Lake Forest on March 17, 1998, at the age of 80. He was survived by his wife, Betty Jean (Alexander) Van Gorkom, and two daughters, Gayle (Van Gorkom) Richardson and Lynne (Van Gorkom) Villalobos. He has 9 grandchildren and 16 great-grandchildren.

Government offices
| Preceded by Richard T. Kennedy | Under Secretary of State for Management; December 22, 1982 – October 14, 1983 | Succeeded by Ronald I. Spiers |
