= Assistant Secretary of State for Occupied Areas =

1946–1949 U.S. post-WWII institution

The Assistant Secretary of State for Occupied Areas oversaw the Office of Occupied Areas, which was created by the United States Department of State on April 8, 1946, to coordinate its activities in Germany, Austria, Japan, and Korea.

The Office was dissolved March 4, 1949, when the department established a new Office of German and Austrian Affairs, and the Office of Far Eastern Affairs assumed responsibility for Japanese and Korean affairs.

Gen. John H. Hilldring was Assistant Secretary of State for Occupied Areas from 1946 to 1947, followed by Charles E. Saltzman from 1947 to 1949.

The Assistant Secretary supervised about 53 employees.
