= Rudy de Leon =

United States politician

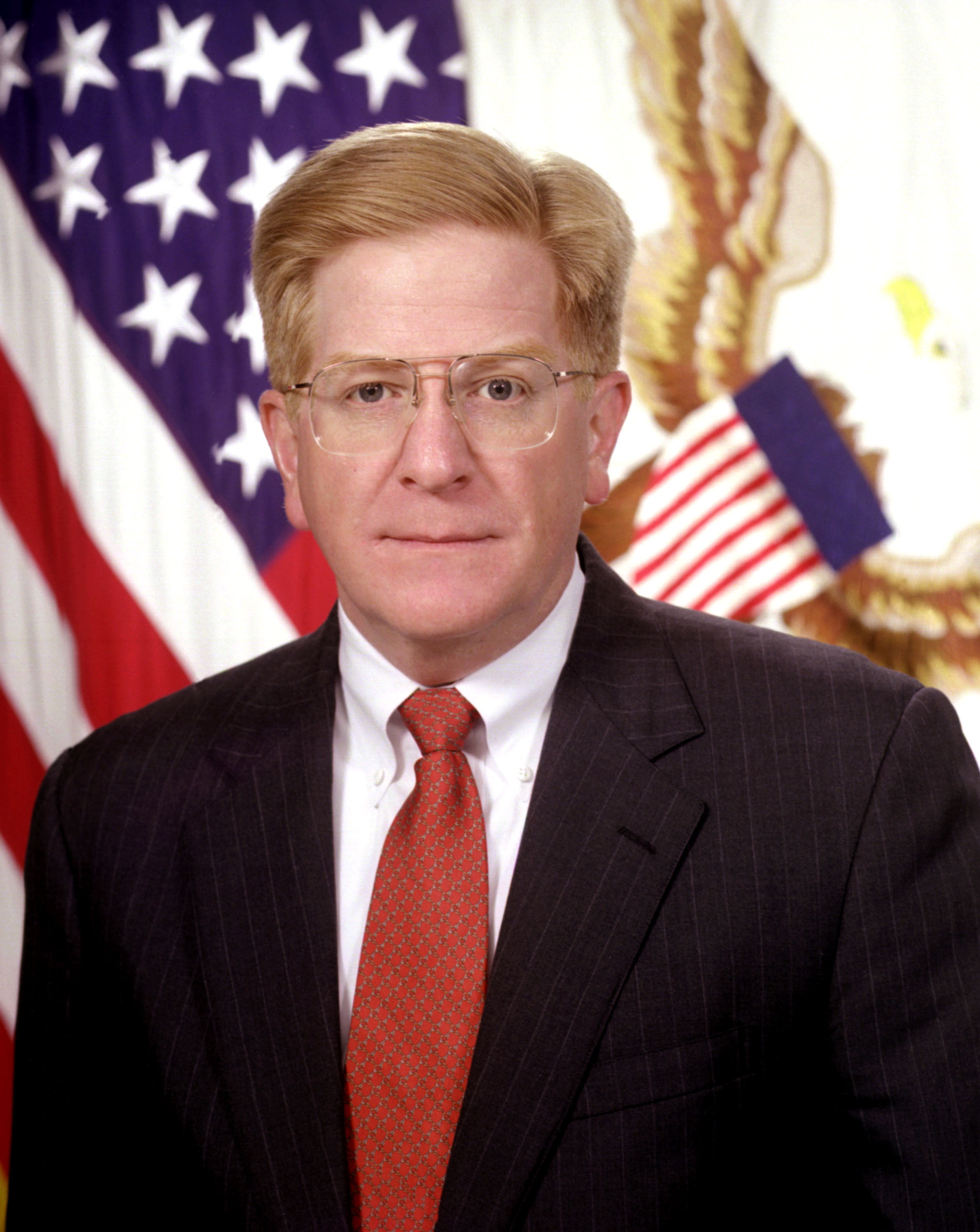
- Official portrait, 2000

27th United States Deputy Secretary of Defense
- In office March 31, 2000 – March 1, 2001
- President: Bill Clinton; George W Bush
- Preceded by: John Hamre
- Succeeded by: Paul Wolfowitz

Under Secretary of Defense for Personnel and Readiness
- In office August 5, 1997 – March 31, 2000
- President: Bill Clinton
- Preceded by: Edwin Dorn
- Succeeded by: Bernard D. Rostker

Under Secretary of the Air Force
- In office 1994–1997
- President: Bill Clinton
- Preceded by: Anne N. Foreman
- Succeeded by: F. Whitten Peters

Personal details
- Born: August 28, 1952 (age 74) Pasadena, California, U.S.
- Party: Democratic
- Spouse: Anne de Leon
- Children: 2
- Education: Loyola Marymount University (BA)

Rupert "Rudy" Frank de Leon Jr. (born August 28, 1952) is an American former senior Department of Defense official, military adviser, lobbyist, and foreign policy adviser. He served as the Deputy Secretary of Defense, described as the "second-highest civilian defense position", from March 31, 2000 until March 16, 2001, and before appointed as Deputy Secretary he had served as Under Secretary of Defense for Personnel and Readiness from 1997 until 2000 and as Under Secretary of the Air Force from 1994 to 1997 in the administration of Bill Clinton.

Since 2007, he has served as Senior Vice President of National Security and International Policy at the Center for American Progress in Washington.

== Education ==
Born in Pasadena, California, De Leon studied at El Camino College for two years and then transferred to Loyola Marymount University, earning a B.A. degree in history in 1974. He continued his education at the University of Maryland in 1977. De Leon later completed the executive program in national and international security affairs at the John F. Kennedy School of Government at Harvard University in 1984.

== Government career ==
De Leon began his career in the federal government in 1975, and held various positions for 25 years until 2001. He had staff positions in the Senate and House of Representatives. From 1985 through 1993, he served on the Committee on Armed Services as a member of the professional staff and director. In 1987–1988, he attended MIT Seminar XXI. In 1986, he participated in the debate and passage of the 1986 Goldwater-Nichols Act, which made fundamental changes in military organization and operations. He was a top aide to Les Aspin in 1993. He was nominated by then-president Bill Clinton, and confirmed by the Senate, for the positions of undersecretary of the Air Force from 1994 to 1997, and undersecretary of defense for personnel and readiness from 1997 to 2000. He worked with civilian Pentagon officials on matters such as ending discrimination within the military, decisions about awarding Medals of Honor to military service personnel, as well as preventing biological terrorism by inoculations against anthrax. As Deputy Defense Secretary, he had authority over matters such as decisions by the Air Force regarding military spy planes. According to a website from the Center for American Progress, he received the Defense Civilian Distinguished Service Award in 1994, 1995, and 2001, and received the National Intelligence Distinguished Service Medal in 2001, and was recognized by the National League of POW-MIA Families in 1999 and by the National Military Families Association in 2000.

== Lobbying ==
De Leon worked for the Boeing Company as a senior vice president from 2001 to 2006, managing the Washington office.

== Other activities ==
De Leon has served as a college lecturer as well as foreign policy expert for the Center for American Progress. He has written numerous articles on matters of foreign policy and military policy.

Government offices
Preceded by Anne N. Foreman	Under Secretary of the Air Force; 1994–1997	Succeeded by F. Whitten Peters
Preceded by Edwin Dornv	Under Secretary of Defense for Personnel and Readiness; 1997–2000	Succeeded by Bernard D. Rostker
Preceded by John Hamre	United States Deputy Secretary of Defense; 2000–2001	Succeeded by Paul Wolfowitz
