= Grant S. Green Jr. =

American politician (born 1938)

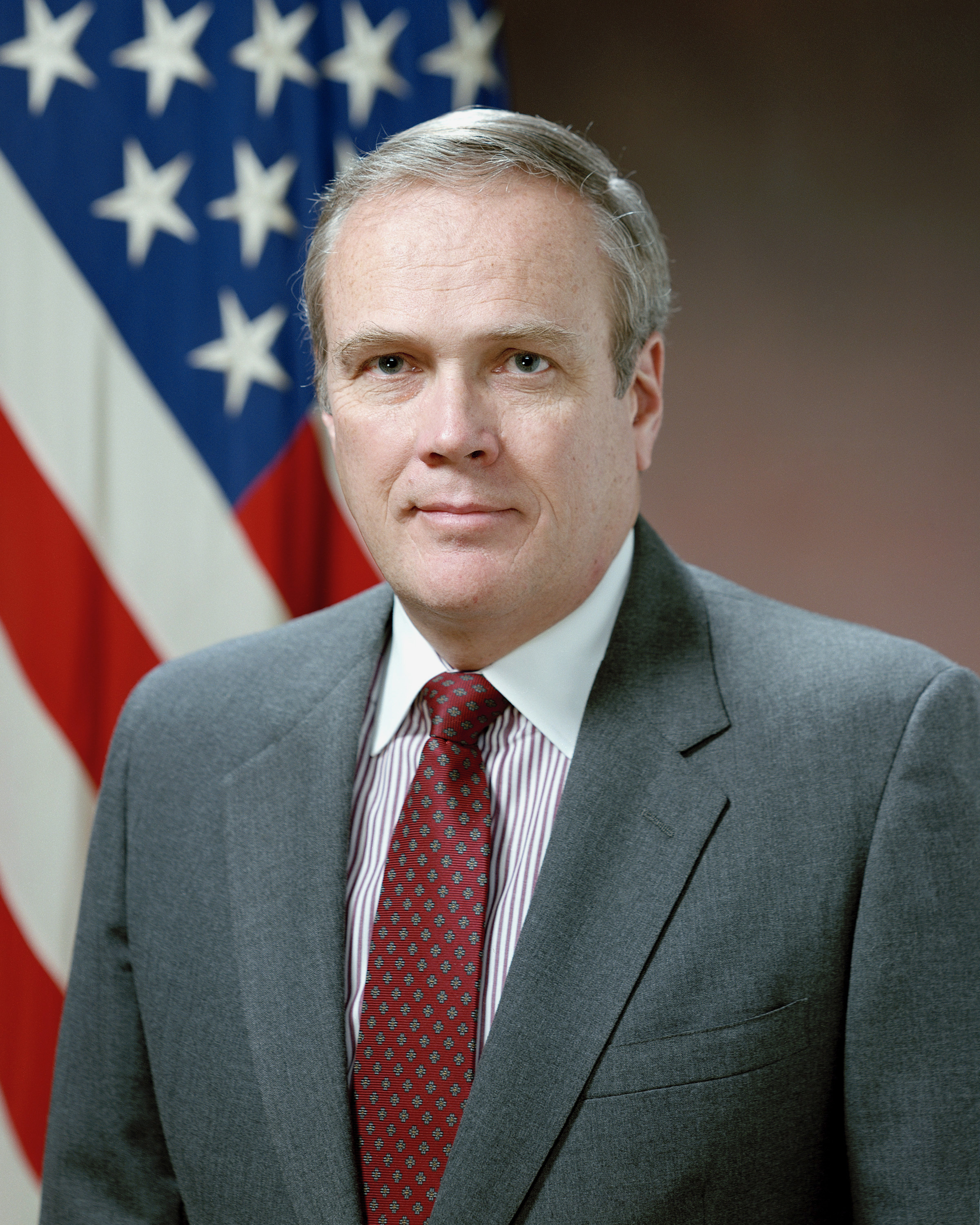

12th Under Secretary of State for Management
- In office March 30, 2001 – January 25, 2005
- President: George W. Bush
- Secretary: Colin Powell
- Preceded by: Bonnie R. Cohen
- Succeeded by: Henrietta H. Fore

Assistant Secretary of Defense for Force Management and Personnel
- In office February 3, 1988 – March 5, 1989
- President: Ronald Reagan; George H. W. Bush
- Secretary: Frank C. Carlucci III; William H. Taft IV (Acting)
- Preceded by: Chapman B. Cox
- Succeeded by: Christopher Jehn

Personal details
- Born: Grant Sherle Green Jr. June 16, 1938 (age 88) Seattle, Washington, U.S
- Party: Republican
- Education: University of Arkansas (BA); George Washington University (MS)

Military service
- Allegiance: United States
- Branch/service: United States Army
- Years of service: 1960–1983
- Rank: Colonel
- Unit: 2nd Aviation Battalion
- Battles/wars: Vietnam War

Grant Sherle Green Jr. (born June 16, 1938) is an American former military officer and politician who has held offices within the United States Department of Defense and the United States Department of State. He served as the 12th Under Secretary of State for Management under president George W. Bush from March 2001 to January 2005. He previously served as the Assistant Secretary of Defense for Readiness and Force Management from February 1988 to March 1989 under presidents Ronald Reagan and George H.W Bush.

== Early life and education ==
Green was born in Seattle on June 16, 1938. He was the son of Grant Sherle Green Sr. (April 14, 1908 – January 16, 2003) and Eveleth Gertrude (Solberg) Green (April 12, 1909 – February 8, 2007). His father served as an artillery officer with the 41st Infantry Division in the Pacific theatre during World War II, earning a Silver Star Medal and two Bronze Star Medals.

Green graduated from Fort Smith Senior High School in Arkansas in 1956. Green then attended the University of Arkansas, receiving a B.A. in political science in 1960.

== Military career ==
After college, Green joined the United States Army and served at various times with the 82nd Airborne Division, the 25th Infantry Division, and the 2nd Infantry Division, where he commanded the 2nd Airborne Battalion. During the Vietnam War, he served with the 1st Cavalry Division and the 101st Airborne Division, where he commanded an assault helicopter unit. Green went on to serve for four years on the Army's General Staff at the Pentagon, and then an additional four years on the staff of the United States Secretary of Defense and the United States Deputy Secretary of Defense. During his time with the army, Green continued his education, receiving an M.S. in management from George Washington University in 1979. He also took classes at the United States Army Command and General Staff College and the Air War College.

== Political career ==
Green left the army in 1983, joining Sears World Trade; there, his work focused initially on government contracts, then included regional management, and then he spent 1984-86 as special assistant to the chairman of SWT.

In 1986, Green joined the White House as Special Assistant to the President for National Security Affairs and as Executive Secretary of the United States National Security Council. In this capacity, Green was responsible for supervising the NSC's staff in their day-to-day interactions with the president and the National Security Advisor, Colin Powell. In December 1987, President of the United States Ronald Reagan nominated Green as Assistant Secretary of Defense for Force Management and Personnel, replacing Robert C. Duncan. As Assistant Secretary, he was responsible for all of the United States Department of Defense's military and civilian manpower and personnel issues, including manpower for weapons.

Green left government service in 1989, becoming executive vice president and chief operating officer of a consulting firm. He became president and chief executive officer of Global Marketing and Development Solutions in 1996.

In 2001, the new United States Secretary of State, Colin Powell, asked Green to serve as Under Secretary of State for Management. President George W. Bush nominated Green to this office, and, after Senate confirmation, he served in this position from March 30, 2001, until February 4, 2005.

Green returned to Global Marketing and Development Solutions in 2005 as chairman. Since 2007, he has also been president of America Supports You and a member of the Commission on Wartime Contracting in Iraq and Afghanistan.

Government offices
Preceded by Bonnie R. Cohen	Under Secretary of State for Management; March 30, 2001 – January 25, 2005	Succeeded by Henrietta H. Fore
