= Ronald I. Spiers =

American diplomat (1925–2021)

United States Ambassador to the Bahamas
- In office September 7, 1973 – September 2, 1974
- President: Richard Nixon
- Preceded by: Moncrieff J. Spear
- Succeeded by: Seymour Weiss

United States Ambassador to Turkey
- In office May 26, 1977 – January 11, 1980
- President: Jimmy Carter
- Preceded by: William B. Macomber, Jr.
- Succeeded by: James W. Spain

United States Ambassador to Pakistan
- In office 1981–1983
- President: Ronald Reagan
- Preceded by: Arthur W. Hummel, Jr.
- Succeeded by: Deane Roesch Hinton

8th Director of the Bureau of Intelligence and Research
- In office January 28, 1980 – October 4, 1981
- Preceded by: William G. Bowdler
- Succeeded by: Hugh Montgomery

6th Under Secretary of State for Management
- In office November 23, 1983 – May 15, 1989
- Preceded by: Jerome W. Van Gorkom
- Succeeded by: Ivan Selin

1st Director of the Bureau of Political-Military Affairs
- In office September 18, 1969 – August 2, 1973
- Preceded by: Position established
- Succeeded by: Seymour Weiss

Personal details
- Born: July 9, 1925 Orange, New Jersey, U.S.
- Died: June 24, 2021 (aged 95) Exeter, New Hampshire, U.S.
- Spouse: Patience Baker

Ronald Ian "Ron" Spiers (July 9, 1925 – June 24, 2021) was an American diplomat who served as an Ambassador to several countries during the 1970s and 1980s.

== Early life and military career ==
Spiers was born in Orange, New Jersey, in July 1925 but grew up in Peru, London, Paris and Brussels. During World War II, he served as an ensign in the United States Navy in the war's Pacific theater. He later became the commanding officer of an amphibious landing craft.

Spiers graduated from Madison (NJ) High School in 1943, then attended Dartmouth College, graduating in 1948 with a bachelor's degree. He also attended the Woodrow Wilson School of Public and International Affairs at Princeton University, earning his Master of Public Affairs degree in 1950.

== Government service ==
After graduating from Princeton, Spiers became a foreign affairs specialist with the U.S. Atomic Energy Commission, serving until 1955, when he began his career with the U.S. Foreign Service, in the Bureau of International Organization Affairs. During his AEC career he conceived the proposal for what became the International Atomic Energy Agency.

During his career with the State Department, Spiers worked in a variety of assignments, often involving arms control. He served at the U.S. Mission to the United Nations (in Geneva), as a negotiator for the Statute of the International Atomic Energy Agency, and also was a U.S. negotiator in a series of arms negotiations with the Soviet Union, including the Partial Test Ban Treaty, Nuclear Non-Proliferation Treaty, First Strategic Arms Limitation Treaty and the Anti-Ballistic Missile Treaty.

In 1964 Spiers became director of NATO Affairs, serving until 1966, when he was appointed the Political Counselor at the U.S. Embassy to the United Kingdom. In 1969 he was appointed Assistant Secretary of State for Political-Military Affairs by President Nixon, serving until 1973 when he was chosen by President Nixon to be the first U.S. Ambassador to the Bahamas. In 1974 he returned to London as Charge d'affaires and Deputy Chief of Mission, holding this post until 1977 when he was appointed by President Carter as the U.S. Ambassador to Turkey. In January 1980 he was selected to be Assistant Secretary of State for Intelligence and Research by President Carter. He was selected by President Reagan to be Ambassador to Pakistan in 1981.

On August 4, 1983, President Ronald Reagan nominated Spiers to be Under Secretary of State for Management. He served through the Reagan Administration as Undersecretary of State. Toward the end of the Reagan Administration George Shultz attempted to place Spiers as U.S. Ambassador to Canada. Congresswoman Olympia Snowe of Maine wrote to Reagan, pointed out that Maine had a deep interest in US-Canadian relations, and argued that Spiers was not suitable for such a key job. Shultz then offered Spiers for the job of UN Undersecretary for Political Affairs. In the UN's patronage system, that job was given to the candidate chosen by the State Department. In this position Spiers became the highest-ranking American citizen in the United Nations Secretariat.

Spiers retired in March 1992 with two Presidential Distinguished Executive Service Awards and the rank of Career Ambassador, an honorary rank he was accorded by the President and the US Senate in 1984. Equivalent to "four star" military rank it is reserved for a small number of career Foreign Service officers who have served with distinction in the highest positions of the Foreign Service.

== Life after government service ==
In 2004 Spiers again returned to the public eye when he joined Diplomats and Military Commanders for Change, a group of former diplomats, ambassadors, and military leaders criticizing the foreign policy of President George W. Bush and supporting the election of John Kerry in the 2004 U.S. presidential election. Spiers died in Exeter, New Hampshire in June 2021, at the age of 95.

== Works ==
- "The Anatomy of Terrorism" (PDF). Foreign Service Journal. September 2004. pp. 43–47, 49–50.
- "Where Are We Going From Here?" Overseas Democrat. August 21, 2003.
- "Terrorism: How Do You Know When You Win?" (PDF). Vermont Rutland Herald. March 24, 2004.
- "Map to Peace: Going Nowhere Fast" (PDF). Vermont Rutland Herald. September 2, 2003.

Government offices
Preceded by None	Director of the Bureau of Politico-Military Affairs; September 18, 1969 – August 2, 1973	Succeeded by Seymour Weiss
Diplomatic posts
Preceded by Moncrieff J. Spear as Chargé d'Affaires ad interim	United States Ambassador to the Bahamas; September 7, 1973–September 2, 1974	Succeeded by Seymour Weiss
Preceded by William B. Macomber, Jr.	United States Ambassador to Turkey; 1977 – 1980	Succeeded by James W. Spain
Preceded by Arthur W. Hummel, Jr.	United States Ambassador to Pakistan; 1981 – 1983	Succeeded by Deane Roesch Hinton
Government offices
Preceded by William G. Bowdler	Director of the Bureau of Intelligence and Research; January 28, 1980 – October 4, 1981	Succeeded by Hugh Montgomery
Preceded by Jerome W. Van Gorkom	Under Secretary of State for Management; November 23, 1983 – May 15, 1989	Succeeded by Ivan Selin
