= Anne N. Foreman =

American politician

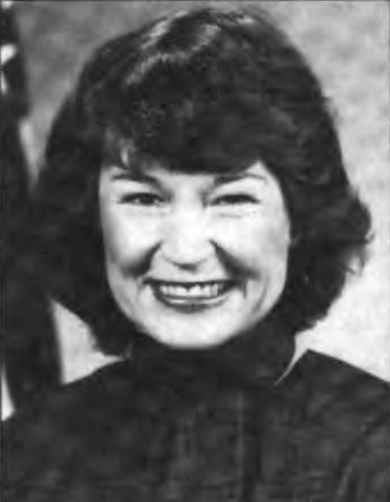

17th United States Under Secretary of the Air Force
- In office May 1, 1989 – January 20, 1993
- President: George H. W. Bush
- Preceded by: James F. McGovern
- Succeeded by: Rudy de Leon

Personal details
- Born: October 16, 1947 (age 79) Hollywood, California, U.S.
- Party: Republican
- Education: University of Southern California (BA, MA); American University Washington College of Law (JD)

Anne Newman Foreman (born October 16, 1947, in Hollywood, California) is a United States diplomat, lawyer, and businesswoman, who was General Counsel of the Air Force from 1987 to 1989 and United States Under Secretary of the Air Force from May 1, 1989, to January 20, 1993.

== Biography ==
Anne N. Foreman was educated at University of Southern California, receiving a B.A. in History and French, and an M.A. in History. She also later obtained a J.D. from the Washington College of Law.

After completing her education, Foreman joined the United States Foreign Service, serving in Beirut and Tunis and as a delegate to the 31st Session United Nations General Assembly (1976). In the later 1970s, Foreman practiced law at the law firm of Bracewell & Patterson in Houston and then, from 1979 to 1985, at Boodle Hatfield in London.

In 1985, Foreman took a job at the White House as associate director of Presidential Personnel for National Security, a job she held until 1987. She was General Counsel of the Air Force from 1987 to 1989. From September 1987 to January 1993, she was United States Under Secretary of the Air Force.

Foreman has worked in the private sector since leaving government service in 1993, including as a Director of Wackenhut, Ultra Electronics, and Trust Services, Inc. In 1999, she became the court appointed trustee of a claims management company, the National Gypsum Company Bodily Injury Trust, and director and treasurer of a second claims management company, the Asbestos Claims Management Corporation. She joined the Board of the GEO Group in 2002.

Government offices
Preceded by Eugene R. Sullivan	General Counsel of the Air Force; 1987 – 1989	Succeeded by ???
Preceded by James F. McGovern	United States Under Secretary of the Air Force; September 1989 – January 1993	Succeeded by Rudy de Leon
