= Moncrieff J. Spear =

American diplomat (1921–2016)

United States Consul General to the Bahamas
- In office 1970–1973
- President: Richard Nixon
- Preceded by: Turner B. Shelton
- Succeeded by: Ronald I. Spiers

Personal details
- Born: September 24, 1921 New York, U.S.
- Died: October 22, 2016 (aged 95) Indianapolis, Indiana
- Spouse: Lois Stamey
- Profession: diplomat

Moncrieff Johnston Spear (September 24, 1921 – October 22, 2016) was an American diplomat.

Spear was born in New York and attended Cornell University (B.A. 1946) and George Washington University (M.A. 1952). He was a veteran, served with the United States Navy in World War II. After the war, in 1946, Spear joined the United States Foreign Service. He had assignments in Germany, the Philippines, Yugoslavia, Thailand and Vietnam. He was the United States Chargé d'Affaires ad interim in the Bahamas at the opening of the U.S. Embassy in 1973. He married Lois Stamey and had three children.
