= John H. Hilldring =

American general

John Henry Hilldring
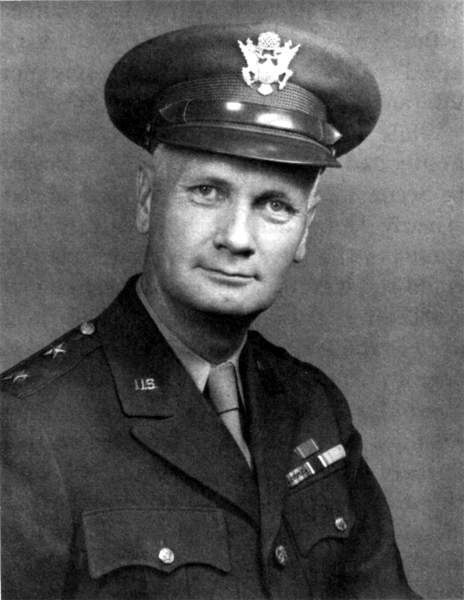
- Born: March 27, 1895; New Rochelle, New York, United States
- Died: January 20, 1974 (aged 78)
- Military career
- Allegiance: United States
- Branch: United States Army
- Service years: 1917–1946
- Rank: Major General
- Service number: 0-7420
- Unit: Infantry Branch
- Commands: 84th Infantry Division; Civil Affairs Division
- Conflicts: World War I World War II
- Awards: Distinguished Service Cross; Army Distinguished Service Medal (2)

Major General John Henry Hilldring (March 27, 1895 – January 20, 1974) was a senior United States Army officer who fought during both World War I and World War II and served as Assistant Secretary of State for Occupied Areas from 1946 to 1947.

== Biography ==
Hilldring was born in New Rochelle, New York on March 27, 1895. He was of Swedish descent, and was educated at Columbia University before transferring to the University of Connecticut, graduating in 1918. He served in the United States Army during World War I, with the rank of first lieutenant, into the infantry. He saw action on the Western Front and was awarded the Distinguished Service Cross.

Hilldring went on to become a career officer in the Army. In this capacity, he was posted in the Philippines. In 1936, he was appointed to the General Staff of the United States Army.

With the American entry into World War II, Hilldring became Assistant Chief of Staff of the United States Army in 1942. With the rank of major general, he became the Commanding General (CG) of the 84th Infantry Division later in 1942. In 1943, he became the Chief of the Army's Civil Affairs Division. In this capacity, he served as a U.S. delegate at the Potsdam Conference. Hilldring retired from the Army in 1946.

On April 12, 1946, the President of the United States, Harry S. Truman, nominated Hilldring to be Assistant Secretary of State for Occupied Areas. He was sworn in on April 17, 1946, and held office until August 31, 1947.

In 1950, Hilldring became foreign-operations manager of General Aniline & Film, a Swiss chemical firm that was seized by the U.S. during World War II on suspicion of Nazi domination. He was promoted to executive vice president in 1954, and became the company's president in 1955.

== Decorations ==
Distinguished Service Cross
Army Distinguished Service Medal with Oak Leaf Cluster
World War I Victory Medal with five Battle clasp
Army of Occupation of Germany Medal
American Defense Service Medal
American Campaign Medal
European-African-Middle Eastern Campaign Medal
World War II Victory Medal

== Works by John H. Hilldring ==
- "What is Our Purpose in Germany?", The Annals of the American Academy of Political and Social Science (January 1948)
- "The Common Market", The International Executive (Summer 1960)

Military offices
Preceded by Newly activated organization	Commanding General 84th Infantry Division; 1942–1943	Succeeded by Stonewall Jackson
Government offices
Preceded by New Office	Assistant Secretary of State for Occupied Areas; April 17, 1946 – August 31, 1947	Succeeded by Charles E. Saltzman
