= Executive Secretary of the United States Department of State =

U.S. government position

- Seal of the United States Department of State

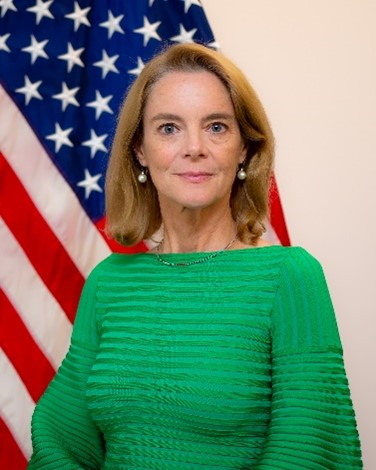
- Incumbent; Lisa D. Kenna since January 20, 2025
- Appointer: Secretary
- Inaugural holder: Lucius Durham Battle
- Formation: 1961
- Website: Official website

The executive secretary of the United States Department of State is the director of the Executive Secretariat. The position holds a rank equivalent to an assistant secretary. Every executive secretary is appointed by the secretary of state.

The executive secretary serves as the liaison and the clearinghouse between the State Department’s bureaus and the leadership offices of the secretary, the deputy secretaries, and the director of policy planning. The executive secretary also manages relations between the State Department and the White House, the National Security Council, and other cabinet-level agencies. As the head of the Executive Secretariat, the executive secretary also manages the State Department's Operations Center and prepares briefing papers about the Department during transitions between presidential administrations.

== History ==
The State Department established the Executive Secretariat in March 1947 to regulate the flow of information within the highest levels of the Department. In 1961, the Department conferred on the Director of the Executive Secretariat the title of Special Assistant to the Secretary of State and Executive Secretary, along with rank equivalent to an Assistant Secretary of State. Since then, the Secretary of State has appointed all Executive Secretaries.

== List of Executive Secretaries ==
#	Tenure	Executive Secretary	Secretary of State
1	1961–1962	Lucius Durham Battle	Dean Rusk
2	1962–1963	William H. Brubeck	Dean Rusk
3	1963–1969	Benjamin Huger Read	Dean Rusk
4	1969–1973	Theodore Lyman Eliot Jr.	William P. Rogers
5	1973–1974	Thomas R. Pickering	Henry Kissinger
6	1974–1976	George Stoney Springsteen Jr.	Henry Kissinger
7	1976–1977	C. Arthur Borg	Henry Kissinger
8	1977–1981	Peter Tarnoff	Cyrus Vance, Edmund Muskie
9	1981–1983	L. Paul Bremer	Alexander Haig, George Shultz
10	1983–1985	Charles Hill	George Shultz
11	1985–1987	Nicholas Platt	George Shultz
12	1987–1989	Melvyn Levitsky	George Shultz
13	1989–1991	J. Stapleton Roy	James Baker
14	1991–1993	W. Robert Pearson	James Baker, Lawrence Eagleburger
15	1993–1994	Marc Isaiah Grossman	Warren Christopher
16	1994–1996	Kenneth C. Brill	Warren Christopher
17	1996–1998	William J. Burns	Warren Christopher, Madeleine Albright
18	1998–2001	Kristie Ann Kenney	Madeleine Albright
19	2001–2002	Maura Ann Harty	Colin Powell
20	2002–2005	Karl William Hofmann	Colin Powell
21	2005–2007	Harry K. Thomas Jr.	Condoleezza Rice
22	2007–2009	Daniel Bennett Smith	Condoleezza Rice
23	2009–2012	Stephen D. Mull	Hillary Clinton
24	2012–2014	John R. Bass	Hillary Clinton, John Kerry
25	2014–2017	Joseph Macmanus	John Kerry
26	2017–2020	Lisa D. Kenna	Rex Tillerson, Mike Pompeo
27	2021–2023	Kamala S. Lakhdhir	Antony Blinken
28	2023-2025	Dereck J. Hogan	Antony Blinken
29	2025-	Lisa D. Kenna	Marco Rubio
