= James F. McGovern =

American lawyer

James McGovern
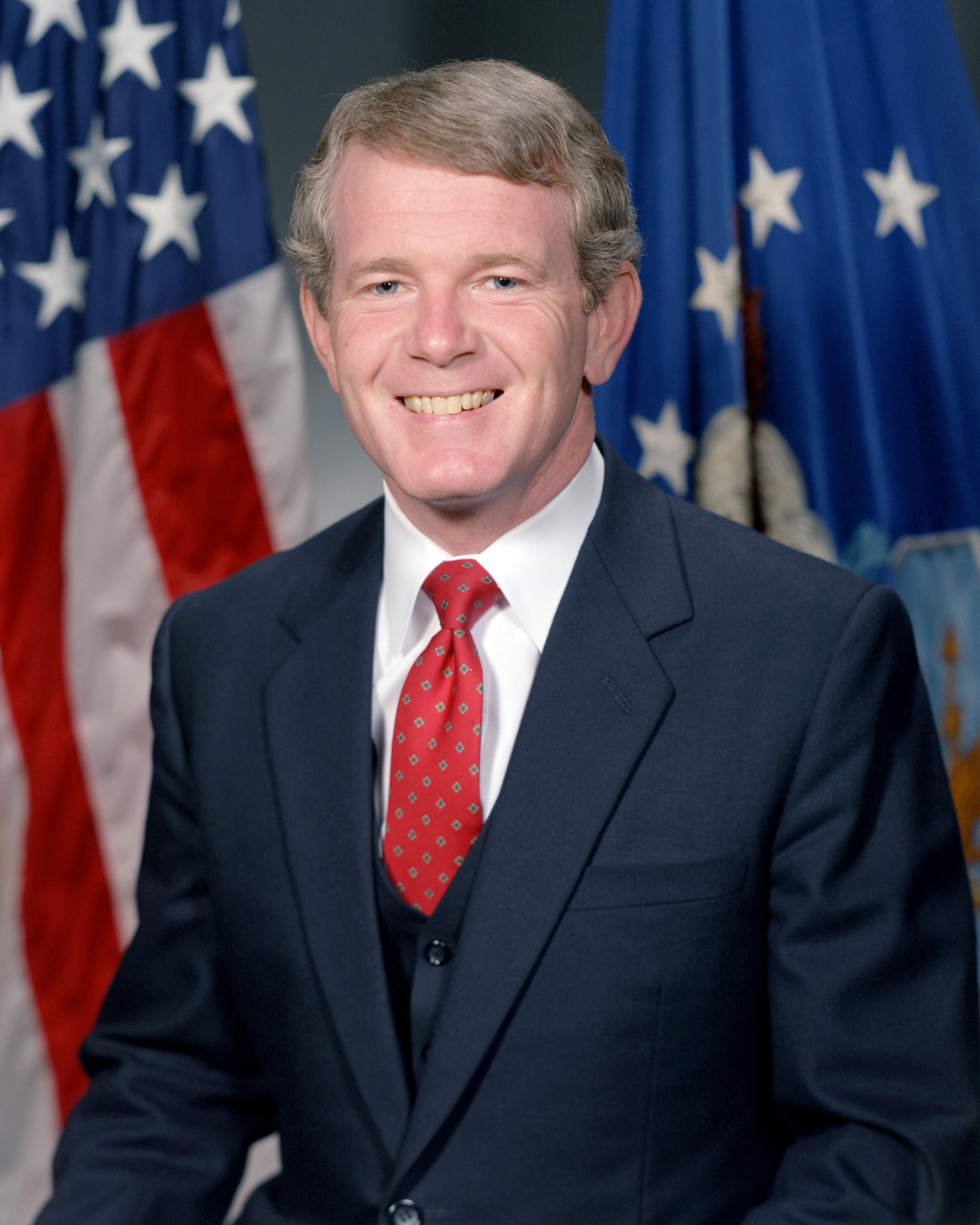

United States Secretary of the Air Force
- Acting
- In office December 16, 1988 – April 29, 1989
- President: Ronald Reagan
- Preceded by: Edward C. Aldridge Jr.
- Succeeded by: John Welch (acting)

16th United States Under Secretary of the Air Force
- In office November 19, 1986 – May 1, 1989
- President: Ronald Reagan
- Preceded by: Edward C. Aldridge Jr.
- Succeeded by: Anne N. Foreman

Personal details
- Born: November 28, 1946 (age 79) Dayton, Ohio, U.S.
- Party: Republican
- Education: United States Naval Academy (BS); Georgetown University (JD)

James F. McGovern (born November 28, 1946) was United States Under Secretary of the Air Force from 1986 to 1989.

== Early life, education and career ==
James F. McGovern was born in Dayton, Ohio, on November 28, 1946. He was educated at the United States Naval Academy, receiving a B.S. in 1969. He then served in the United States Navy on active duty from 1969 to 1979, at which time he became a member of the United States Marine Corps Reserve.

McGovern received a Juris Doctor degree from the Georgetown University Law Center, in Washington, D.C., in 1978.

From 1978 to 1981, he was an associate attorney at the law firm of Dickstein Shapiro in Washington, D.C. He then spent 1981 and 1982 as general counsel of the United States Senate Committee on Armed Services under the chairmanship of U.S. Senator John Tower (Republican Party senator from Texas). He was promoted to become the committee's staff director and chief counsel in 1982, holding that post until 1987.

On September 17, 1986, U.S. President Ronald Reagan nominated McGovern to be U.S. Under Secretary of the Air Force. He then served as Acting U.S. Secretary of the Air Force from December 1988 until April 1989.

== Post-government career ==
After leaving government service, McGovern spent seven years as the president of Teledyne Brown Engineering. He later served as the president of Tripolis Technologies, a managing director of El Camino Capital Partners, the chief executive officer of Dunhill Technologies, a senior managing director of McGovern & Associates, and as the chief executive officer of Calpoint. In 2005, he became a member of the board of directors of the Parsons Corporation and in 2016 joined the board of Ingram Micro.

Government offices
Preceded by Edward C. Aldridge Jr.	United States Under Secretary of the Air Force; 1986–1989	Succeeded by Anne N. Foreman
Preceded by Edward C. Aldridge Jr.	United States Secretary of the Air Force; Acting; 1988–1989	Succeeded by John Welch; Acting
