= Bonnie R. Cohen =

American government official

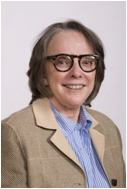

11th Under Secretary of State for Management
- In office August 20, 1997 – January 20, 2001
- Preceded by: Richard M. Moose
- Succeeded by: Grant S. Green, Jr.

Personal details
- Born: 1942 (age 83–84)

Bonnie R. Cohen (born 1942) was United States Under Secretary of State for Management from 1997 to 2001.

== Biography ==
Bonnie R. Cohen was educated at Smith College, receiving a B.A. in 1964, and at Harvard Business School, receiving an M.B.A. in 1967.

Cohen spent the next quarter century in the private sector. She would eventually become an investment consultant to the Stanford University endowment; treasurer of the United Mine Workers of America's Health and Retirement Funds; senior vice president of the National Trust for Historic Preservation; and investment chair of the District of Columbia Public Pension Funds.

In 1992, President of the United States Bill Clinton nominated Cohen as Assistant Secretary of the Interior for Policy, Management and Budget, serving under United States Secretary of the Interior Bruce Babbitt. She served in the United States Department of the Interior until 1996, when President Clinton nominated her as Under Secretary of State for Management; she subsequently held this office from August 20, 1997 until January 20, 2001, serving under United States Secretary of State Madeleine Albright.

Upon leaving the United States Department of State, Cohen formed a consulting firm, B. R. Cohen and Associates. She has also served on the boards of Cohen & Steers, an investment firm specializing in REIT funds, and the Perini Corporation, a large general contractor. She has also served on the boards of several non-profits, including the Washington National Opera and the Posse Foundation. She served as a trustee of the District of Columbia Public Libraries and is currently on the boards of the DCPL Foundation and of 100 Reporters.

In 2009, President Barack Obama appointed Cohen as a member of the Defense Business Board.

Cohen is married to Louis R. Cohen, a lawyer at WilmerHale. The couple have a son, Eli Augustus Cohen, a daughter, Amanda Cohen Leiter, and five grandchildren.

Government offices
Preceded by Richard M. Moose	Under Secretary of State for Management; August 20, 1997 – January 20, 2001	Succeeded by Grant S. Green, Jr.
