= Bureau of Budget and Planning =

Government bureau

The Bureau of Budget and Planning (BP), previously the Bureau of Resource Management, is a bureau under the Under Secretary of State for Management of the United States Department of State. The bureau assists agency heads with developing policies, plans, and programs to achieve foreign policy goals. The Director of Budget and Planning also coordinates resource requirements to enable the Secretary of State to present integrated International Affairs resource submissions to the Office of Management and Budget and to the United States Congress.

== Directors of the Bureau of Budget and Planning ==
The Department of State divided the Bureau of Resource Management into the Bureau of Budget and Planning and the Bureau of the Comptroller and of Global Financial Services on June 29, 2012. Directors of the Bureau of Budget and Planning are designated, not commissioned.

- 1. Barbara Retzlaff (2012–2015)
- 2. Douglas Alexander Pitkin (2015–present)
