= Commission on Wartime Contracting in Iraq and Afghanistan =

Commission of the United States government

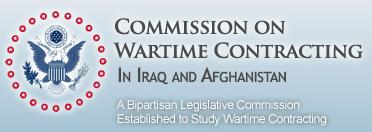
Logo of the Commission on Wartime Contracting in Iraq and Afghanistan.

The Commission on Wartime Contracting in Iraq and Afghanistan was an independent, bipartisan commission of the United States government established in 2008 to study government contracting related to the Afghanistan War and the Iraq War. Headline findings included over $30bn waste and fraud identified along with further potential losses through unsustainable projects.

The commission closed on September 30, 2011, in accordance with statutory sunset provisions. (Note: Archived commission materials are now held on the CyberCemetery website of the University of North Texas Libraries.)

== Background ==
The establishment of the Commission on Wartime Contracting in Iraq and Afghanistan was a response to allegations that billions of dollars had been misappropriated in Afghanistan and in Iraq. In response to these allegations, on July 18, 2007, Senators Jim Webb (D—VA) and Claire McCaskill (D—MO) introduced a bill to create a commission modeled after the Truman Committee, which oversaw government contracting during World War II. Rep. John F. Tierney (D—MA-6) introduced a similar bill in the House in September 2007. These bills were subsequently endorsed by the Project on Government Oversight, Taxpayers for Common Sense, the Government Accountability Project, OMB Watch, Common Cause, the Public Interest Research Group, and Iraq and Afghanistan Veterans of America.

This bill was passed as part of the National Defense Authorization Act for Fiscal Year 2008, which was signed into law by President George W. Bush on January 28, 2008.

== Membership ==
By statute, the commission was bipartisan and made up of commissioners appointed by bipartisan officeholders. The following chart indicates the make-up of the commission.

Name	Position	Office Appointed By	Individual Appointed By
Michael J. Thibault	Majority Co-chair	Senate Majority Leader and Speaker of the United States House of Representatives (jointly)	Harry Reid and Nancy Pelosi
Chris Shays	Minority Co-chair	Minority leader of the United States House of Representatives	John Boehner
Clark Ervin	Member	Speaker of the United States House of Representatives	Nancy Pelosi
Grant S. Green, Jr.	Member	President of the United States	George W. Bush
Robert J. Henke	Member	Senate Minority Leader	Mitch McConnell
Katherine Schinasi	Member	Senate Majority Leader	Harry Reid
Charles Tiefer	Member	Senate Majority Leader	Harry Reid
Dov S. Zakheim	Member	President of the United States	George W. Bush

== Findings ==
The Commission summarized its findings in its final report as:

Contractors represent more than half of the U.S. presence in the contingency operations in Iraq and Afghanistan, at times employing more than a quarter-million people. They have performed vital tasks in support of U.S. defense, diplomatic, and development objectives. But the cost has been high. Poor planning, management, and oversight of contracts has led to massive waste and has damaged these objectives. The volume and complexity of contract actions have overwhelmed the ability of government to plan for, manage, and oversee contractors in theater. Contracting decisions made during urgent contingencies have often neglected the need to determine whether host-nation governments can or will sustain the many projects and programs that U.S. contracts have established in their countries.
