= Seymour Weiss (diplomat) =

American diplomat and high-ranking official

2nd Director of the Bureau of Political-Military Affairs
- In office August 6, 1973 – January 17, 1974
- Preceded by: Ronald I. Spiers
- Succeeded by: George S. Vest

Personal details
- Born: May 15, 1925 Chicago, Illinois
- Died: September 23, 1992 (aged 67) Bethesda, Maryland
- Education: University of Pennsylvania; University of Chicago (MIA)

Seymour Weiss (May 15, 1925 – September 23, 1992) was an American diplomat and a high-ranking official at the United States Department of State. He specialized in the fields of nuclear strategy and arms control.

== Biography ==
Weiss was born in Chicago on May 15, 1925. He served in the United States Navy during World War II, achieving the rank of Lieutenant. After the war, he attended the University of Pennsylvania, and then received a Master of International Affairs degree from the University of Chicago.

Weiss then spent five years working in the Office of Management and Budget and the United States Agency for International Development. Weiss then joined the United States Foreign Service.

From 1968 to 1969, Weiss headed the State Department's Office of Strategic Research and Intelligence. He spent 1972-73 as deputy director of the Policy Planning Staff.

In 1973, President of the United States Richard Nixon nominated Weiss as Director of the Bureau of Politico-Military Affairs; he held this office from August 6, 1973 until January 17, 1974.

President Gerald Ford appointed Weiss United States Ambassador to the Bahamas in 1974, and Weiss held this post, his last, from September 11, 1974, until December 15, 1976.

In retirement, Weiss continued to act as an adviser on foreign policy and defense affairs. In the late 1970s, was an advisor to Team B. During the 1980 presidential election, he was a foreign policy advisor for Ronald Reagan, and during the Reagan administration, he would serve as an advisor to United States Secretaries of Defense Caspar Weinberger (1981–87) and Frank Carlucci, and under the administration of George H. W. Bush as an advisor to Defense Secretary Dick Cheney. Weiss was generally considered a neoconservative, a hawk, and an anti-Soviet hard-liner.

Weiss died of liver cancer at his home in Bethesda, Maryland, on September 23, 1992, at the age of 67.

Government offices
Preceded by Ronald I. Spiers	Director of the Bureau of Politico-Military Affairs; August 6, 1973 – January 17, 1974	Succeeded by George S. Vest
Diplomatic posts
Preceded by Ronald I. Spiers	United States Ambassador to the Bahamas; September 11, 1974 – September 15, 1976	Succeeded by Jack B. Olson
