= Christopher Jehn =

American politician (born 1943)

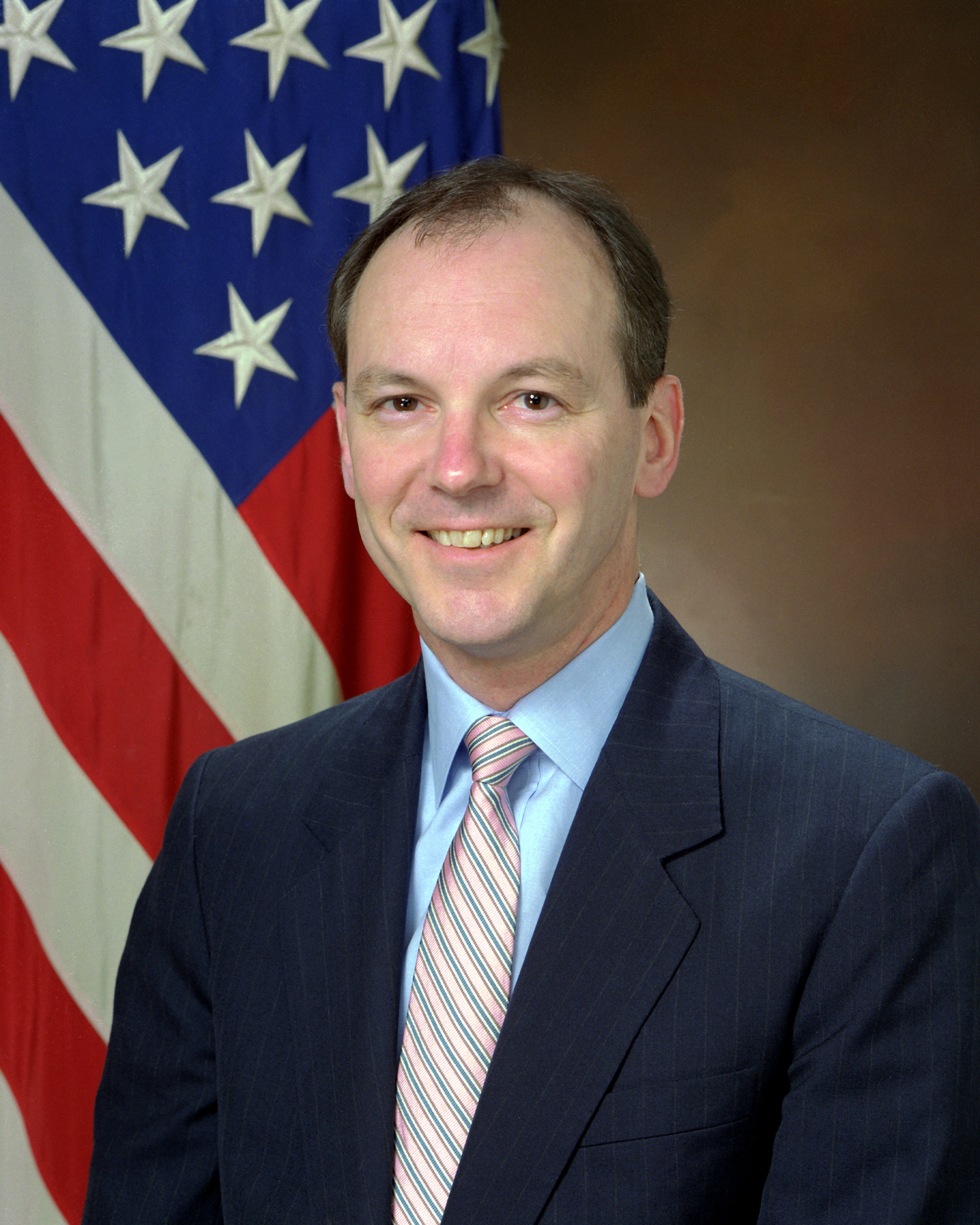

Assistant Secretary of Defense for Force Management and Personnel
- In office November 20, 1989 – January 20, 1993
- President: George H. W. Bush
- Preceded by: Grant S. Green Jr.
- Succeeded by: Edwin Dorn

Personal details
- Born: 12 March 1943 (age 83) Chicago, Illinois, U.S
- Children: 1
- Education: Beloit College; (B.A); University of Chicago; (M.A)
- Occupation: Politician

Christopher Jehn (born 12 March 1943) is an American politician who served as Assistant Secretary of Defense for Force Management and Personnel under George H. W. Bush from November 1989 to January 1993. He was nominated by Bush in August 1989. After his end of term in January 1993, he went and served as the Assistant Director of National Security for the Congressional Budget Office in 1998. And as the Vice President for Government Programs at Cray Research Inc in 2001.

== Life ==
Christopher Jehn was born on 12 March 1943 in Chicago, Illinois. Jehn graduated from Beloit College with a Bachelor of Arts in 1965 and from the University of Chicago with a Master of Arts. Jehn has a wife and one daughter. He currently resides in Falls Church, Virginia.
