= John P. White =

American university professor and government official

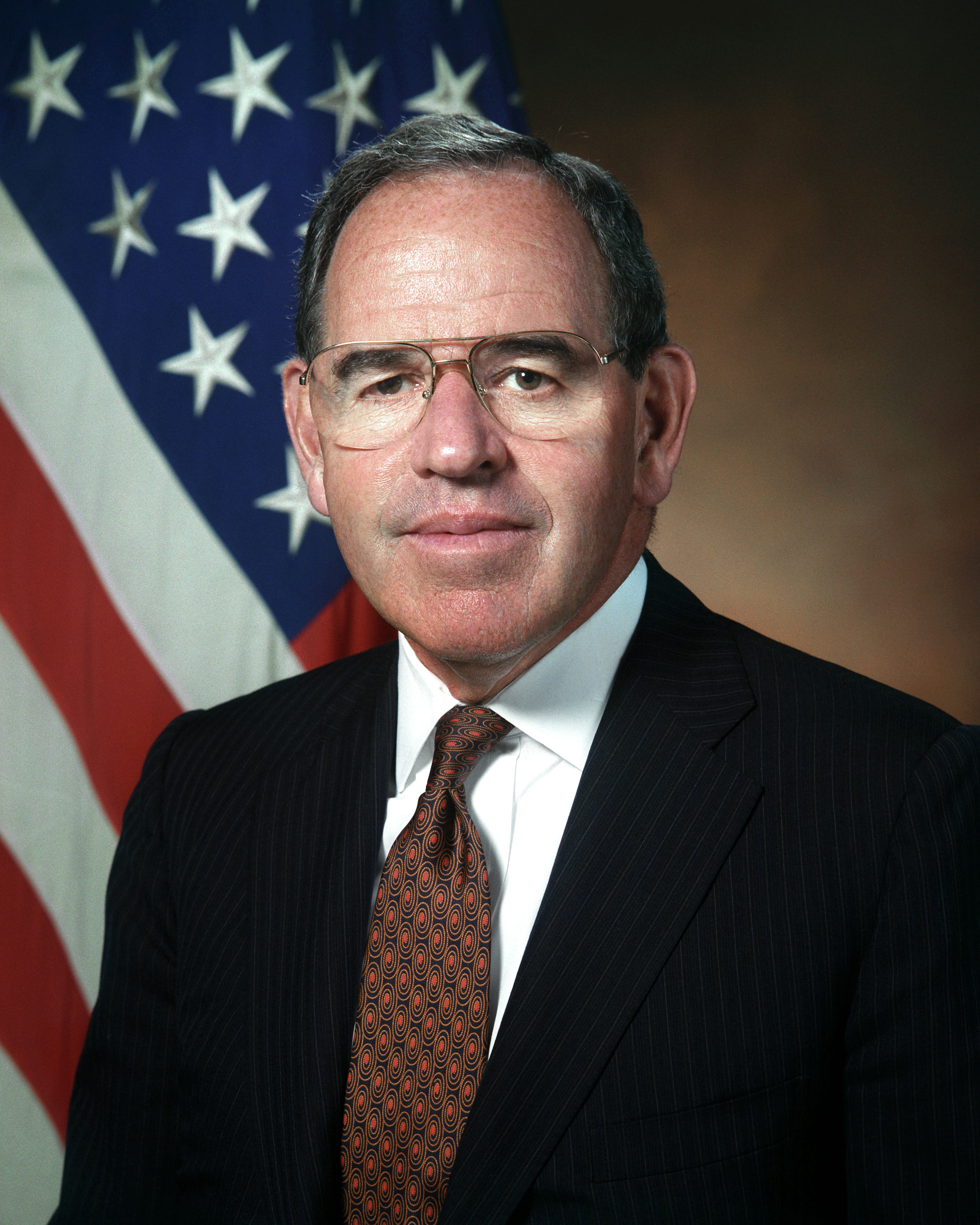
- White in 1994

25th United States Deputy Secretary of Defense
- In office June 22, 1995 – July 15, 1997
- President: Bill Clinton
- Preceded by: John M. Deutch
- Succeeded by: John J. Hamre

Assistant Secretary of Defense for Logistics and Materiel Readiness
- In office May 11, 1977 – October 31, 1978
- President: Jimmy Carter
- Preceded by: Frank A. Shrontz
- Succeeded by: Robert B. Pirie, Jr.

Personal details
- Born: John Patrick White; February 27, 1937 Syracuse, New York
- Died: September 3, 2017 (aged 80) Great Falls, Virginia
- Education: Syracuse University (Ph.D.)

Military service
- Allegiance: United States
- Branch/service: United States Marine Corps
- Years of service: 1959–1961
- Rank: First Lieutenant

John Patrick White (February 27, 1937 – September 3, 2017) was an American university professor, and a government official who served in the Clinton Administration.

== Life and career ==
White was born in Syracuse, New York in 1937 and received his high school diploma from the Cathedral Academy there in 1955. He graduated from Cornell University in 1959 with a B.S. in industrial and labor relations. In 1964, White received an M.A. in economics and public administration from the Maxwell School of Citizenship and Public Affairs at Syracuse University, and in 1969 a Ph.D. in labor economics from there. His doctoral thesis was entitled The nature and extent of underemployment of the employed work force in U.S. manufacturing.

He served as the Deputy Secretary of Defense from 1995 to 1997, as deputy director of the Office of Management and Budget from 1978 to 1981, Assistant Secretary of Defense for Manpower, Reserve Affairs and Logistics from 1977 to 1978, and as a lieutenant in the United States Marine Corps from 1959 to 1961. He was twice awarded the Department of Defense Medal for Distinguished Public Service.

Prior to his most recent government service, he was the director of the Center for Business and Government at Harvard University and the chairman of the Commission on Roles and Missions of the Armed Forces.

His extensive private-sector experience included service as chairman and CEO of Interactive Systems Corporation from 1981 to 1988 and, following its sale to the Eastman Kodak Company in 1988, as general manager of the Integration and Systems Products Division and as a vice president of Kodak until 1992. In nine years with the RAND Corporation, he was the senior vice president for national security research programs and a member of the board of trustees. White was also a member of the Council on Foreign Relations.

White served as a director of L-3 Communications Corporation, IRG International, Inc., and the Institute for Defense Analyses, as well as the Concord Coalition and Center for Excellence in Government. He was also a member of the Defense Advisory Committee on Military Compensation, and the Policy and Global Affairs Oversight Committee of the National Research Council. From 1998 to 2012, White was the Robert and Renee Belfer Lecturer at the John F. Kennedy School of Government at Harvard University.

White died at an assisting living center in Great Falls, Virginia, from complications of Parkinson's disease on September 3, 2017, at the age of 80. White and his wife Elizabeth Lucille (Michaud) White were interred at Arlington National Cemetery on July 16, 2018.

Political offices
Preceded by John M. Deutch	United States Deputy Secretary of Defense; 1995–1997	Succeeded by John Hamre
