= History of civil affairs in the United States Armed Forces =

United States Department of Defense, and associated, civil affairs are civil-military operations (CMO) use of military force to control areas seized from the enemy (or a third party), minimize insurgency or civil interference with military operations, and maximize civil support for military operations. CMO is conducted in conjunction with combat operations during wartime and becomes a central part of a military campaign in counter-insurgencies. CMO operations have been in frequent use since 1775 by the United States Army, as well as more recently by the Navy and Marine Corps.

== Early history ==
They became major activities for the Continental Army during the American Revolution. Civil-military operations conducted by the U.S. Army were common in the colonial era in dealing with hostile Indians. During that war, all sides employed civil affairs in every colony/state. Military authorities managed activities that civilians had managed prior to the war. The invasion of Canada in 1775 was an early example, The American invaders won considerable support from the locals, but failed to capture Quebec City and were forced to retreat in disarray.

In the U.S.-Mexican War, Lt. Gen. Winfield Scott could be considered the "Father of Civil Affairs." He displayed a deep respect for the Mexican people and their culture. Scott enjoyed great success in keeping civilian problems from interfering with military operations by issuing General Order No. 20 and ensuring the Provost Marshals office enforced it. The United States Army considers this to be where Civil Affairs (CA) originated.

== Civil War and reconstruction ==
The Army had large-scale CMO roles during the American Civil War, and for much of the Reconstruction Era until the last units were withdrawn in 1877.

== 1877–1934 ==
At the end of the 19th century, and well into the 20th U.S. Army and Marine Corps were involved in numerous military interventions in several of the Caribbean and Latin American nations before and after World War I. After the Spanish–American War ended in 1898, Maj. Gen. Leonard Wood restored order in Cuba with CA forces. The Army returned to Cuba in 1905, again in 1912, and starting in 1917, was there for a period of many years. The Marine Corps was called upon to protect American interests by military intervention in the Dominican Republic (1916–1924), Haiti (1915–1934), and Nicaragua (1926–1934). The Army was also called to Panama in 1903 to ensure the birth of that nation when it broke away from Colombia to become independent.

According to the John F. Kennedy Special Warfare Center & School located at Fort Bragg, North Carolina, at worst, the CMO performance was highhanded and overbearing, while at best, the Army and Marine Corps restored more stable economic and political situations in those areas.

Showing "Uncle Sam with a schoolbook in one hand and a Krag rifle in the other" best summarized the civil-military policy in the Philippines, which was also acquired by the United States as a result of the Spanish–American War. While Cuba became independent in 1902, the Philippines was granted the status of a territory, with the promise of independence. It became independent in 1946. The payoff of an enlightened military government policy was the Filipinos were the only Pacific colonized peoples to resist the Japanese on any scale.

=== World War I ===
World War I saw few, if any, civil affairs activities; however, during post-Armistice weeks, the U.S. Army administered the government of an overseas enemy population in the German Rhineland and in Luxembourg where no stable government existed after Germany's defeat and exit of the region. The army's Polar Bear Expedition occupied Arkhangelsk on the shore of the White Sea through the winter of 1918–1919 in a failed attempt to establish a stable anti-Bolshevik government in northern Europe. The American Expeditionary Force Siberia occupation of Vladivostok from 1918 to 1920 was similarly unsuccessful in stabilizing an anti-Bolshevik government on the Pacific coast. Between World War I and World War II, the U.S. Army was involved in a surprising number of civic action projects such as the Civilian Conservation Corps.

"The American army of occupation lacked both training and organization to guide the destinies of the nearly one million civilians whom the fortunes of war had placed under its temporary sovereignty", stated Col. Irwin L. Hunt, Officer in Charge of Civil Affairs, Third Army, in his report on U.S. military government in Germany after World War I.

He wrote further, "Military government, the administration by military officers of civil government in occupied enemy territory, is a virtually inevitable concomitant of modern warfare. The US Army conducted military government in Mexico in 1847 and 1848; in the Confederate States during and after the Civil War; in the Philippines, Puerto Rico, and Cuba after the Spanish–American War; and in the German Rhineland after World War I. In each instance, neither the Army nor the government accepted it as a legitimate military function. Consequently, its imposition invariably came as a somewhat disquieting experience for both, and the means devised for accomplishing it ranged from inadequate to near disastrous."

The Hunt Report, as it affectionately came to be known by the World War II generation of military Government officers, for the first time in the Army's experience looked on administration of occupied territory as something more than a minor incidental of war. Colonel Hunt realized that to exercise governmental authority, even over a defeated enemy, required preparation. The Army, he urged, should not again wait until the responsibility was thrust upon it but should develop competence in civil administration among its officers during peacetime.

In the aftermath of World War I, when almost nothing appeared more remote than the possibility of the Army's again occupying foreign territory, The Hunt Report nearly – but not quite-disappeared. Because it was the only substantial document on the subject, War College committees working in civil affairs periodically brought it out of the files. But the tendency of the War College in the 1920s was to look at civil affairs and military government entirely as they related to military law, the assumption being that they were not much more than the functions of observing and enforcing law. A broader interpretation began to emerge only after the 1934-1935 G-1 (personnel) committee at the War College prepared a draft military government manual, and a committee in the 1939-1940 class produced a manuscript on administration of occupied territory.

Over the years, War College committees had also recommended several times that the Army prepare a field manual on military government. Because of the presumed close relationship between this function and military law, the job seemed to fall logically to the Judge Advocate General. In October 1939, the Judge Advocate General, Maj. Gen. Allen W. Gullion, turned down one such recommendation on the ground that his office had recently published U.S. Army Field Manual FM 27–10, The Rules of Land Warfare, which contained a substantial section on civil administration. By then, however, war had broken out in Europe, and the work of the recent War College committees had put military government in a new light. Early the next year, at the urging of G-3 (operations and training) and G-1 and with the War College materials and The Hunt Report to work from, Gullion's office began writing a manual. The result, published on 30 July 1940, was FM 27–5, Military Government, a statement of purposes, policies, and procedures. The two field manuals, The Rules of Land Warfare and Military Government, would eventually be regarded as the Old and New Testaments of American military government; but in the summer of 1940 the country was not at war, and of everything it then lacked, the Army undoubtedly missed a military government manual least.

== World War II ==
By 1942 Nazi Germany controlled most of Europe and was driving deep into the Soviet Union and across North Africa toward Egypt. In World War I, military government had not been needed until after the armistice, because the war had been fought mainly in France, and the French authorities had handled civil affairs for all the armies. World War II was clearly going to be different; governments had disappeared, gone into exile, or become collaborating puppets. Whenever the anti-Axis forces challenged the Germans on land, they would almost certainly have to deal with civilian populations from the outset. The British had already had some experience in late 1940 in the Italian African colonies, Eritrea, Cyrenaica, and Italian Somaliland.

In early 1941 the Intelligence Training Centre of the British War Office inaugurated politico-military courses at St. John's College, Cambridge. Their purpose was "to train officers in postwar reconstruction and other missions incident to military operations in foreign countries." Two US Army officers, Maj. Henry H. Cumming and Lt. Charles A. H. Thomson, attended the third course, which began in October 1941, and thereby became the first American officers to receive military government training. The politico-military courses dealt with history, geography, economics, and politics and aimed at giving the officer-students background knowledge rather than specific instruction in military government.

World War II saw the U.S. Army receive its Civil Affairs "charter." The Pentagon in 1943 activated the U.S. Army Civil Affairs Division (CAD) on the recommendation of Provost Marshal General of the Army, Allen W. Gullion. The major problem faced by the CAD was heavy destruction of the infrastructure. Never before or since has U.S. Army Civil Affairs been so extensively involved in nation rebuilding for so long. The CAD was responsible for 80 million European civilians; yet no documented case of overt opposition has ever come to light. Post-war military government proved extremely successful in our former enemies’ nations. The CAD also returned untold millions of dollars' worth of national treasures to their country of origin. The post-war period was the first planned use of Civil Affairs by the modern United States Army, and the greatest use of CA assets to date.

In 1942, General Dwight D. Eisenhower called attention to the adverse political effects that would result from a failure to meet civilian needs after public assurances had been given in the United States. Thirty thousand tons of civilian supplies were needed every month, but the Lend-Lease Administration was hard put to get them together in time to meet the convoys leaving for North Africa. On arrival in the theater the supplies had to be unloaded and moved by the Army, since the North African Economic Board did not have the staff even to supervise the work; and both the military and the civilian agencies agreed that on the drive into Tunisia the Army would have to assume complete responsibility for civilian relief.

Simply stated, the United States could not simultaneously fight the war and launch into essentially postwar relief and rehabilitation programs. On the other hand, the War Department realized that it had taken too narrow a view and expanded its policy on planning for future operations to include preparations for food, health, housing, and security of civilian populations. It proposed in the initial period to handle all aspects of civil affairs as part of the military operation and to include civilian supplies with the military stores.

Operation Husky was the projected invasion of Sicily that would be the first United States occupation of enemy territory and would set the pattern for subsequent operations. The mission was a success, and the devastated nation was full of dislocated civilian, and required total CA involvement. The Civil Affairs Division (CAD) was established on 1 March 1943, and Maj. Gen. John H. Hilldring became its director a month later. In assigning the division's mission, the War Department reasserted its claim to leadership in civil affairs and military government. The division was to report directly to the Secretary of War on "all matters except those of a military nature" and to represent the Secretary of War to outside agencies. On matters relating to military operations it would act for the Chief of Staff, and it would co-ordinate for the War Department all actions of civilian agencies in theaters of operations. For the future, War Department officials contemplated placing full responsibility for civil affairs in the staff of the theater commander "until such time as the military situation will allow other arrangements," and the Civil Affairs Division was charged with making certain that all plans to occupy enemy or enemy-controlled territory included detailed planning for civil affairs. On 10 April, the Joint Chiefs of Staff confirmed the Civil Affairs Division as "the logical staff to handle civil affairs in nearly all occupied territory."

== Korea ==
During the Korean War (1950–1953), U.S. Army CA found itself involved for the first time in a subsistence agrarian society. Complex and changing organization of U.S. Army command hampered CA activities, as did the attitude of sensitive Republic of Korea (ROK) government officials. According to Henry Kissinger, “the first civil affairs efforts were in the fields of public health, welfare and sanitation, for the purpose of preventing disease, starvation, and unrest. In the winter of 1950-51 the movement of several million refugees threatened interference with the use of vital communication lines. Later still, removal of civilians from combat areas and their subsequent care and disposition were deemed necessary, not only for humanitarian reasons, but as a security measure as well.” Among the more dramatic events was the evacuation of over 90,000 North Korean Christians and anti-communists from Hamhung province to Busan and Koje in December 1950 using ships of the ROK and U.S. Navy and Merchant Marine.

During the height of the war, U.S. civil affairs staff grew to approximately 400 officers and men who administered approximately $150 million in humanitarian and economic assistance.

Kissinger viewed American CMO efforts in Korea with a critical eye, judging it a qualified success. Minimum objectives were obtained: Epidemics were prevented; no significant unrest on the part of the civilian population occurred. While insurgency or epidemics would indicate the failure of civil affairs policies, their absence does not indicate more than a minimum effectiveness.”

The ROK Army has developed an extensive civil affairs structure, with trained active-duty CMO staff officers down to the division level and many thousands of reserve component civil affairs officers and soldiers that train annually to respond to humanitarian disasters at home and abroad. Tens of thousands of ROK government employees participate in annual CMO training as well. The U.S. has always had a strong civil-military presence in Korea and after a generation of successful civic action missions, CA soldiers work side-by-side with their South Korean counterparts. As of 2007, the ROK Army had hundreds of soldiers assisting with CMO in Afghanistan and over several thousand soldiers conducting CMO in northern Iraq.

== Vietnam War ==
In the Vietnam War, CA was more publicized than ever before with its phrase “winning the hearts and minds of the people.” CA's greatest success was in working with U.S. Special Forces in South Vietnam's central highlands and securing large areas of difficult terrain by winning the confidence of local tribes. Since there were no fixed battle lines, CA personnel had to stay in some places indefinitely. By 1966, each Special Forces A-Detachment in the highlands was augmented by a Civil Affairs-Psychological Operations officer (CAPO). The functions of CA and PSYOP were often combined. Three CA companies carried the burden of pacification, working with the State Department. CA assisted Vietnamese civilians by drilling wells, building roads and bridges to help market local products, setting up public health clinics and school buildings, and carrying out public education programs. Seabee Teams were the boots on the ground to accomplishing these projects. The CA programs in the central highlands were, according to the Army's Vice Chief of Staff at the time, “worth their weight in gold.” Overall, the effort to “win the hearts and minds” of the local people was hit and miss however due partly to the fact that civil administration expertise in the Army lay within Army Reserve.

Civil Operations and Rural Development Support (CORDS)

One of the most valuable and successful elements during the conflict was the Civil Operations and Revolutionary Development Support (CORDS) program, which was the civil affairs/civil-military operations aspect of American forces. CORDS was a joint command, with all service branches represented on its military side. CORDS had a large, mostly American, civilian contingent as well. CORDS was created in 1967 to integrate U.S. civilian and military support of the South Vietnamese government and people. CORDS achieved considerable success in supporting and protecting the South Vietnamese population and in undermining the communist insurgents' influence and appeal, particularly after implementation of accelerated pacification in 1968. For most of the time after its inception and through the early 1970s, CORDS was headed by Ambassador William Colby, later to become the head of the CIA.

Pacification was the process by which the government asserted its influence and control in an area beset by insurgents. It included local security efforts, programs to distribute food and medical supplies, and lasting reforms (like land redistribution). In 1965, U.S. civilian contributions to pacification consisted of several civilian agencies (among them, the Central Intelligence Agency, Agency for International Development, U.S. Information Service, and Department of State). Each developed its own programs. Coordination was uneven. The U.S. military contribution to pacification consisted of thousands of advisors. By early 1966, there were military advisory teams in all of South Vietnam's 44 provinces and most of its 243 districts. But there were two separate chains of command for military and civilian pacification efforts, making it particularly difficult for the civilian-run pacification program to function.

In 1967, President Lyndon B. Johnson established CORDS within the Military Assistance Command, Vietnam (MACV), which was commanded by General William Westmoreland, USA. The purpose of CORDS was to establish closer integration of civilian and military efforts. Robert Komer was appointed to run the program, with a three-star-equivalent rank. Civilians, including an assistant chief of staff for CORDS, were integrated into military staffs at all levels. This placed civilians in charge of military personnel and resources. Komer was energetic, strong-willed, and persistent in getting the program started. Nicknamed "Blowtorch Bob" for his aggressive style, Komer was modestly successful in leading improvements in pacification before the 1968 Tet offensive.

In mid-1968, the new MACV commander, General Creighton Abrams, and his new civilian deputy, William Colby, used CORDS as the implementing mechanism for an accelerated pacification program that became the priority effort for the United States. Significant allocations of personnel helped make CORDS effective. In this, the military's involvement was key. In September 1969—the high point of the pacification effort in terms of total manpower—there were 7,601 advisors assigned to province and district pacification teams. Of these 6,464 were military.

The effectiveness of CORDS was a function of integrated civilian and military teams at every level of society in Vietnam. From district to province to national level, U.S. advisors and U.S. interagency partners worked closely with their Vietnamese counterparts. The entire effort was well established under the direction of the country team, led by Ambassador Ellsworth Bunker. General Abrams and his civilian deputy were clear in their focus on pacification as the priority and ensured that military and civilian agencies worked closely together. Keen attention was given to the ultimate objective of serving the needs of the local populace. Success in meeting basic needs of the populace led, in turn, to improved intelligence that facilitated an assault on the Viet Cong political infrastructure. By early 1970, statistics indicated that 93 percent of South Vietnamese lived in "relatively secure" villages, an increase of almost 20 percent from the middle of 1968. By 1972, pacification had largely uprooted the insurgency from among the South Vietnamese population and forced the communists to rely more heavily on infiltrating conventional forces from North Vietnam and employing them in irregular and conventional operations.

In 1972, South Vietnamese forces operating with significant support from U.S. airpower defeated large-scale North Vietnamese conventional attacks. Unfortunately, a North Vietnamese conventional assault succeeded in 1975 after the withdrawal of U.S. forces, ending of U.S. air support, and curtailment of U.S. funding to South Vietnam.

Pacification, once it was integrated under CORDS, was generally led, planned, and executed well. CORDS was a successful synthesis of military and civilian efforts. It is a useful model to consider for other counterinsurgency operations.

== Panama and Grenada ==
The U.S. Army Civil Affairs and Psychological Operations Command (Airborne) we know today began in October 1985 with the formation of the 1st Special Operations Command Augmentation Detachment. This unit of 30 Soldiers formed the nucleus that evolved into the United States Army Reserve Special Operations Command. USARSOC controlled the Army Reserve Special Operations Forces, formed December 1, 1989, which consisted of Army Reserve Special Forces, CA and Psychological Operations units.

Within days of its activation, Operation Just Cause in Panama thrust the Command into action. USARSOC identified and mobilized individual volunteer Reserve Soldiers for duty in Panama and the succeeding CA operation there known as Promote Liberty. JUST CAUSE saw 96th CA BN jumping in at H-Hour with Rangers. Individual Reservists were called up, not units. Major tasks were getting the international airport functioning, providing medical assistance, establishing a "user-friendly" demilitarized police force, establishing a displaced civilians facility, and assisting the legally elected government take control. U.S. CA policy was one of teaching Panamanians how to satisfy their own needs.

Because combat was basically over after D-Day, the Grenada intervention depended proportionally more on civil affairs and civic action than any U.S. Army operation since the Caribbean interventions. One of the lessons learned from this operation was to include CA in the planning phase because as it turned out, stabilization and rebuilding quickly became the major emphasis. Most CA work was in the restoration of the run-down "socialized" infrastructure.

== Desert Shield ==
In Desert Shield/Storm, CA units were activated for the first time since Vietnam. Soon after the Iraqi invasion of Kuwait, a Kuwaiti Task Force was established in Washington DC. It consisted of key U.S. civilian and Kuwaiti government-in-exile officials, plus CA personnel. CA troops were with the first Coalition forces to enter Kuwait City. CA personnel provided liaison between the military and the Saudis who provided fuel, facilities, water, and food.

Operation Provide Comfort was the largest humanitarian relief operation since the Berlin Airlift of 1948 CA troops worked successfully with non-governmental organizations (NGOs), Allied forces and the UN High Commissioner for Refugees (UNHCR) to help Kurdish refugees escape the wrath of Saddam and provided for their welfare in newly established camps.

== Haiti ==
Operation Restore/Uphold Democracy. In late September 1994, U.S. forces started final preparation for an armed invasion of Haiti. On the 11th hour, former President Jimmy Carter negotiated a deal with the Haitian leaders that permitted U.S. forces to go in unopposed. The changed entry situation immediately pushed CA activities to the front in terms of the immediate requirements to repair the run-down Haitian infrastructure. CA soldiers attached to the Rangers were quickly reattached to 3rd SFG units for this reason. Additional CA assets were brought in from various CA Reserve commands to meet the rapid expansion of the CA role. The most far reaching Civil Affairs project to take shape was Operation LIGHT SWITCH, a campaign to restore limited electrical power to major urban areas outside of Port-au-Prince and Cap Haitian. Some areas had been without electricity for nearly 3 years. On 26 September 1994, the 96th CA Bn was given the responsibility for the organization and execution of the operation. The first real problem was a legal one, namely how the project could be funded. Regulations state that Title X funding can be used for such projects if they were “dominimus” in nature. This is defined as being within the scope of what a squad of soldiers working a day could accomplish at no more than $1000 in cost. The scope of the project easily exceeded that. The JAG section quickly drafted a message and sent it forward to the Department of State. In less than 6 hours, a reply arrived clearing the way for the mission to commence.

With a total of 4 days planning and coordination, the first attempts were made to restart electrical plants within the country. Sixteen power plants were restarted in 12 days. Not enough fuel was available to keep the plants running 24 hours a day but it did provide electrical service for 4 to 5 hours a day.

Additional missions accomplished during Operation LIGHT SWITCH included keeping the local telephone company's generators up and running. These generators kept emergency power batteries charged, which provided phone service during periods when the power plant was down. Emergency power generators at local hospitals in some of the towns were also serviced. This servicing enabled doctors to perform life saving operations during hours when electricity was not available and also provided the SF medics a place to use if needed. All the above was linked to a PSYOP campaign to prepare the countryside for Aristide's return. Operation LIGHT SWITCH continued until late January 1995.

CA working with other SOF units accomplished a number of other missions in Haiti. They assisted with the training of the Caribbean multi-national police forces, revising the elementary education program, organized city clean-up programs, conducted classes in selected towns on city government. Another major program was when Federal Judges from the U.S., who were also members of the Army Reserve, were dispatched to overhaul the Haitian judicial system.

== The Balkans ==
In Bosnia, CA troops encountered large-scale devastation for the first time since World War II. Operations in Bosnia were the first in a European country since World War II. AC and RC CA units and individual soldiers truly come into their own. For example, a 411th Civil Affairs Battalion officer from the New York Transit Authority was instrumental in getting the Sarajevo tram line running again, a symbol that the city is returning to something resembling normality. Another RC CA NCO from the New England Gas Authority replaced the dilapidated Sarajevo gas system to get it up and running. On the macro-level, an RC lieutenant colonel banker in civilian life was instrumental in negotiating loans from the World Bank to Bosnian farmers. CMO also worked in areas such as hazardous materials (HAZMAT), unexploded ordnance, cadaver removal and population movement. A three-man team from the 411th CA created a cobbled-together communications system that provided the only link from the western part of the country that allowed election results to reach the capital. All of this was against a background that prohibited “nation-building". The most far-reaching impact of the recent CA operations in Bosnia is the formation by other countries of units with CA-like missions, thereby decreasing the burden on U.S. CA forces.

== War on Terror ==
Following the terrorist attacks on New York and the Pentagon, CA Soldiers deployed to support the effort to locate international terrorists linked to the Al Qaeda network and support the men and women located at Ground Zero. Since 2001, over 1500 CA and PSYOP Soldiers have deployed annually over 20 countries worldwide promoting peace, fighting the war on terror, and assisting in humanitarian actions. CA Soldiers deployed in support of operations in Kosovo, South America and the Far East. They deployed for Operation Iraqi Freedom and Operation Enduring Freedom from 2001 to the present and domestically they help support disaster relief as a result of Hurricane Katrina and flooding in Louisiana. Civil affairs Soldiers continue to play critical roles in the global peace and stabilization and reconstruction of both countries and they continue to provide support for ongoing missions in countries like Egypt, Ethiopia, Georgia and Yemen.

== See also ==
- Civil Affairs

People

- Norris J. Nelson, worked on civil affairs in Norway, World War II
