= Bureau of Medical Services (U.S. Department of State) =

Component of the U.S. Department of State

The Bureau of Medical Services is a component of the Office of the Under Secretary of State for Management. It provides healthcare to U.S. government employees and their families who are assigned to U.S. embassies and consulates. It also advises embassy and State Department management about global health issues.
