= John Hamre =

American academic

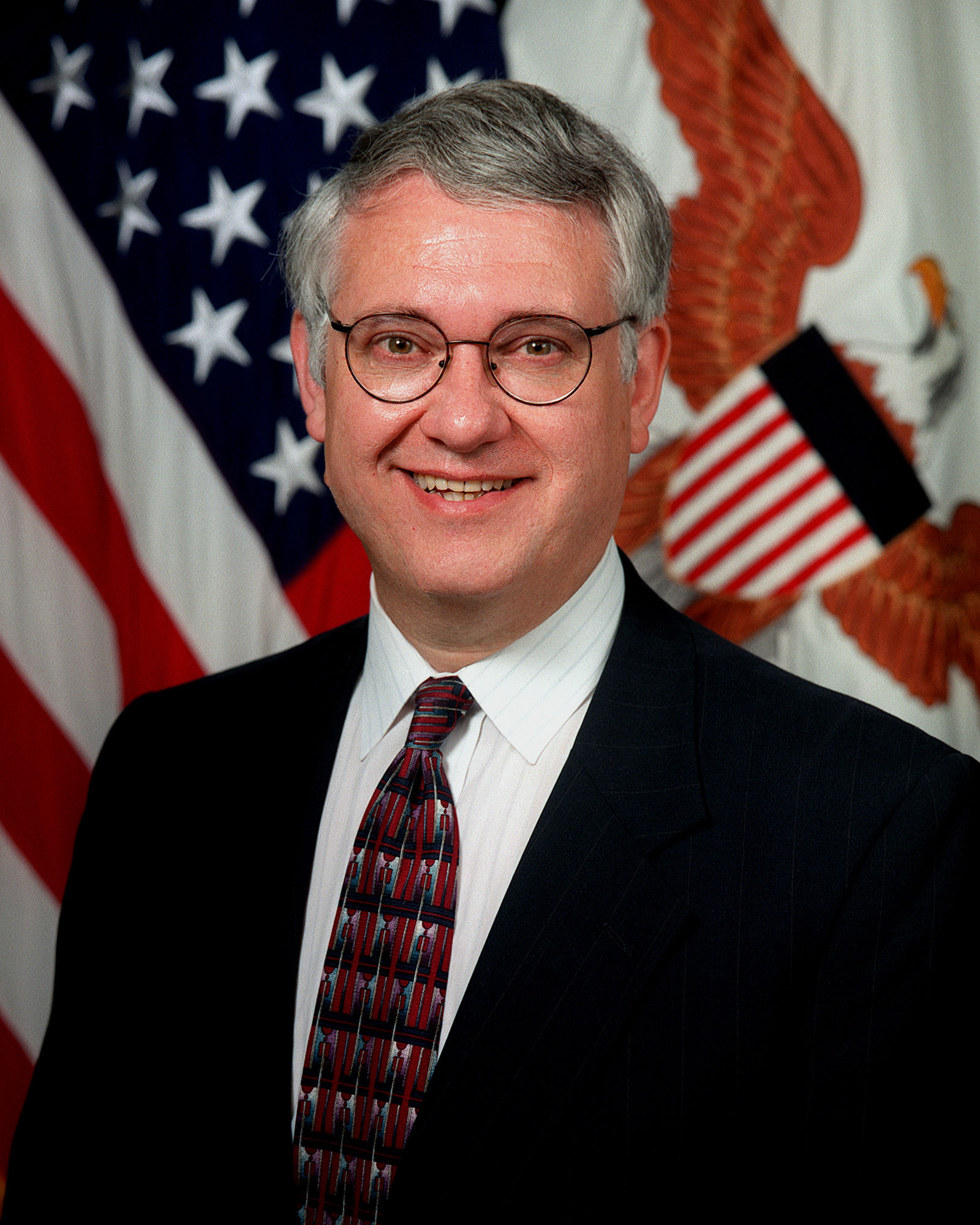
- Official portrait, 1997

26th United States Deputy Secretary of Defense
- In office July 29, 1997 – March 31, 2000
- President: Bill Clinton
- Preceded by: John P. White
- Succeeded by: Rudy de Leon

Under Secretary of Defense (Comptroller)/CFO
- In office October 26, 1993 – July 29, 1997
- President: Bill Clinton
- Preceded by: Sean O'Keefe
- Succeeded by: William J. Lynn III

Personal details
- Born: July 3, 1950 (age 76) Watertown, South Dakota, U.S.
- Party: Republican
- Spouse: Julia Pfanstiehl (m. 1976)
- Education: Augustana College, South Dakota (BA); Harvard University; Johns Hopkins University (MA, PhD)
- Website: Official website

John Julian Hamre (born July 3, 1950) is an American international relations scholar and former senior defense official. He is the president and former CEO of the Center for Strategic and International Studies, a position he held from 2000 to 2026.

== Early life and education ==
Hamre is the son of Melvin Sanders and Ruth Lucile (Larson) Hamre. He attended primary and secondary school in Clark, South Dakota, graduating from the Clark Public High School in May 1968. He earned a B.A. (with high distinction) in political science and economics from Augustana College in Sioux Falls, South Dakota (1972). The following year he was a Rockefeller Fellow at Harvard Divinity School. He earned an M.A. (1976) and Ph.D. (1978) with distinction from the Johns Hopkins University School of Advanced International Studies (SAIS). His doctoral thesis was entitled Congressional Dissent and American Foreign Policy: Constitutional War-Making in the Vietnam Years.

== Federal government service ==
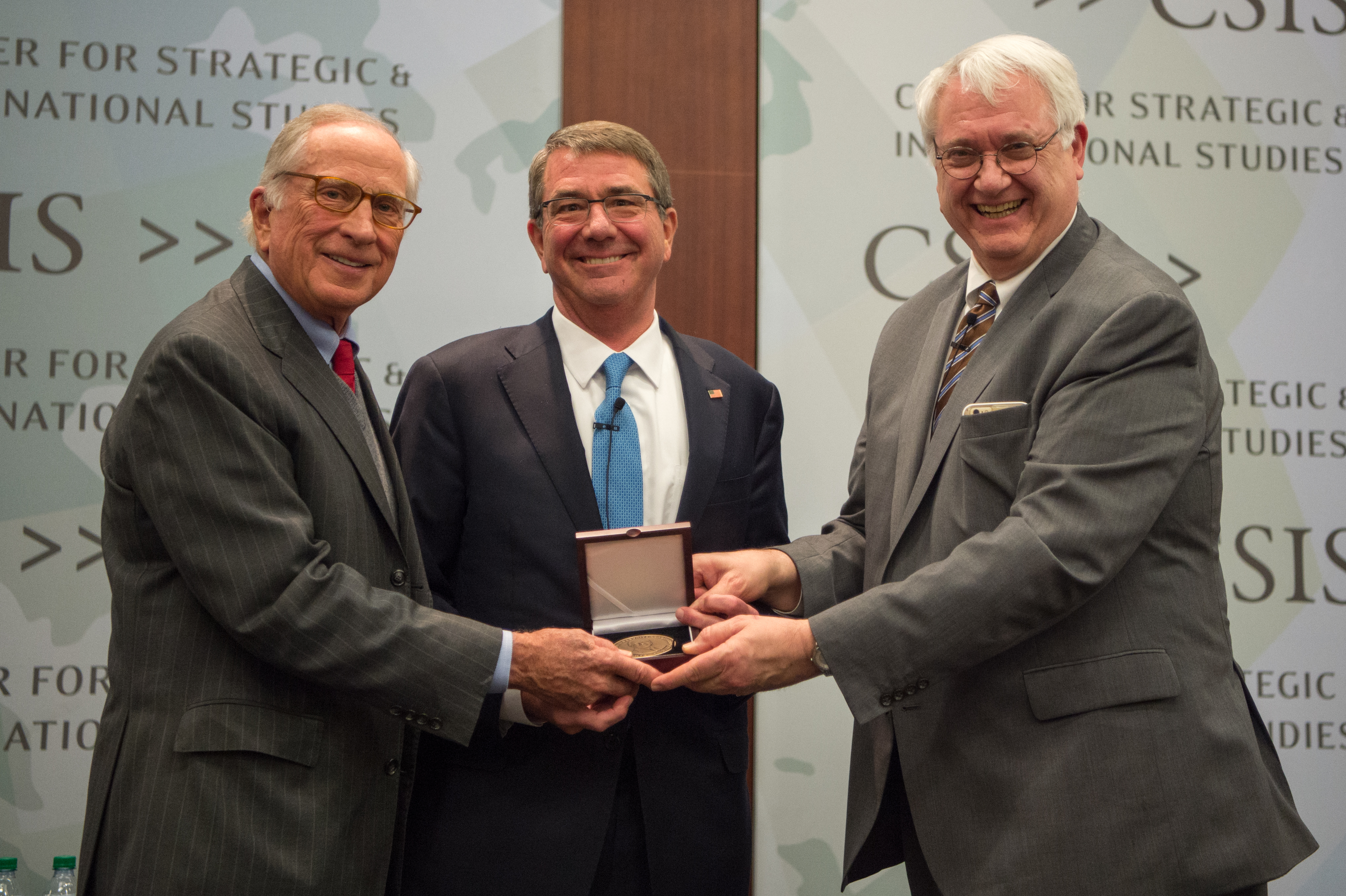
John Hamre (right) with Ash Carter (center) and Sam Nunn

Hamre served in the Congressional Budget Office (1978–1984), where he became its deputy assistant director for national security and international affairs. In that position, he oversaw analysis and other support for committees in both the House of Representatives and the Senate. In the 1980s, he worked for ten years at the Senate Armed Services Committee. During that time, he was primarily responsible for the oversight and evaluation of procurement, research and development programs, defense budget issues, and relations with the Senate Appropriations Committee.

Hamre was DoD Comptroller (1993–1997) and Deputy Secretary of Defense (1997–1999), both under President Bill Clinton.

The Senate appointed Hamre to the Commission on the Future of the United States Aerospace Industry in 2001.

== Post-Federal Government Service ==
Hamre worked on the Obama transition team. He is chairman of the Defense Policy Board. Hamre's continued involvement in the defense establishment has put him on the short list for the position of Secretary of Defense multiple times, including during the formation of the first term of the Obama administration and most recently after the president's re-election in 2012.

In July 2022, Hamre helped found a group of U.S. business and policy leaders who shared the goal of constructively engaging with China in order to improve U.S.-China relations.

== Honors ==
In 2008, the Norwegian King Harald V appointed Hamre Commander of the Royal Norwegian Order of Merit for his efforts "to promote collaboration between Norwegian and American politicians, authorities and researchers".

== Publications (partial list) ==
- Hamre, John J. (1979). U.S. airlift forces : enhancement alternatives for NATO and non-NATO contingencies. Washington, D.C.: Congressional Budget Office. LCCN 79601973.
- Hamre, John J. (1981). Strategic command, control, and communications : alternative approaches for modernization. Washington, D.C.: Congressional Budget Office. LCCN 81603396.
- R. B., Byers; Hamre, John J.; Lindsey, George (1985). Aerospace defence: Canada's future role? (paperback ed.). Toronto, Ontario: Canadian Institute of International Affairs. ISBN 0-919084-52-4. LCCN 85154659.
- Hamre, John J.; et al. (2001). Technology and security in the twenty-first century : U.S. military export control reform : a report of the CSIS Military Export Control Project. Washington, D.C.: CSIS. ISBN 0-89206-401-3. LCCN 2001002850.
- Hamre, John J.; Gordon R. Sullivan (Autumn 2002). "Toward Postconflict Reconstruction" (PDF). The Washington Quarterly. 25 (4): 85–96. doi:10.1162/016366002760252554. S2CID 154993245. Archived from the original (PDF) on July 17, 2011.
- Hamre, John; et al. (July 17, 2003). Iraq's post-conflict reconstruction a field review and recommendations : Iraq reconstruction assessment mission, June 27-July 7, 2003 (PDF). Washington, D.C.: Center for Strategic and International Studies. LCCN 2003543617. Archived from the original (PDF) on September 2, 2009.

Political offices
Preceded by John White	Comptroller of the Department of Defense; 1994–1997	Succeeded by Rudy de Leon
Preceded by John White	United States Deputy Secretary of Defense; 1997–2000	Succeeded by Rudy de Leon
