= Richard M. Moose =

American politician (1932–2015)

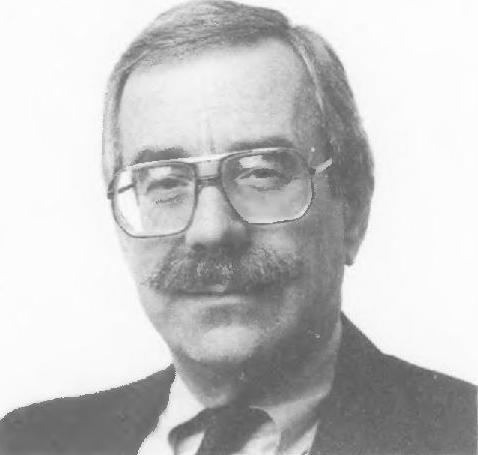

10th Under Secretary of State for Management
- In office August 2, 1993 – September 1, 1996
- President: Bill Clinton
- Preceded by: J. Brian Atwood
- Succeeded by: Bonnie R. Cohen

8th Assistant Secretary of State for African Affairs
- In office 1977 – 1981
- President: Jimmy Carter
- Preceded by: William E. Schaufele, Jr.
- Succeeded by: Chester Crocker

Personal details
- Born: Arkansas, U.S. February 27, 1932
- Died: September 25, 2015 (aged 83)
- Education: Hendrix College (BA); Columbia University (MA)
- Occupation: Executive, diplomat

Richard M. Moose (February 27, 1932 – September 25, 2015) was an American executive and diplomat, who held senior government positions in Democratic Party administrations in the 1970s to 1990s.

== Career ==
Born February 27, 1932 in Arkansas, Moose received his B.A. from Hendrix College in 1953 and M.A. from Columbia University in 1954.

He began work as a Foreign Service Officer in 1956, with stints in Mexico and Cameroon. He worked on the National Security Council as staff secretary until 1970. He then worked on the staff of J. William Fulbright's Senate Foreign Relations Committee. He was appointed by President Carter as the U.S. Assistant Secretary of State for African Affairs from 1977 until 1981. Following some years in executive positions with Shearson Lehman and American Express, he returned to government service as Under Secretary of State for Management under President Clinton. He resigned from this position in August 1996.

Government offices
Preceded by William E. Schaufele Jr.	United States Assistant Secretary of State for African Affairs; 1977–1981	Succeeded by Chester A. Crocker
Preceded by J. Brian Atwood	Under Secretary of State for Management; August 2, 1993 – September 1, 1996	Succeeded by Bonnie R. Cohen
