= Benjamin H. Read =

American lawyer

3rd Under Secretary of State for Management
- In office October 1, 1978 – January 19, 1981
- Preceded by: Charles E. Saltzman
- Succeeded by: Richard T. Kennedy

3rd Executive Secretary of the United States Department of State
- In office 1963–1969
- Preceded by: William H. Brubeck
- Succeeded by: Theodore Lyman Eliot Jr.

Personal details
- Born: 1925 Philadelphia, PA
- Died: 1993 (aged 67–68) Washington, DC
- Education: Williams College (BA); University of Pennsylvania (LLB)

Benjamin Huger Read (1925–1993) was United States Under Secretary of State for Management from 1978 to 1981 under President Jimmy Carter.

== Biography ==
Benjamin H. Read was born in Philadelphia on September 14, 1925. He was raised in Conshohocken, Pennsylvania. During World War II, he served as a sergeant in the United States Marine Corps, seeing service in China and Guam. After the war, he was educated at Williams College, receiving a B.A. in 1949, and the University of Pennsylvania Law School, receiving an LL.B. in 1952.

After law school, Read worked at a private law firm in Philadelphia from 1952 to 1955. He spent 1956–57 as an associate public defender with the Defender Association of Philadelphia. He spent 1957–58 working as an attorney in the Office of the Legal Adviser of the Department of State under Legal Adviser Loftus Becker. In 1958, Read became a legislative assistant to Sen. Joseph S. Clark (D—PA). In 1963, he became executive secretary for United States Secretary of State Dean Rusk. During the 1968 presidential campaign, Read worked with the Democratic nominee, Vice President Hubert Humphrey.

He was named director of the Woodrow Wilson International Center for Scholars in 1969. When Chancellor of Germany Willy Brandt created the German Marshall Fund, he asked Read to become its first president.

On July 25, 1977, President Jimmy Carter nominated Read as Deputy Under Secretary of State for Management and, the next year, nominated him as Under Secretary of State for Management. After Senate confirmation, Read held this office from October 1, 1978, until January 19, 1981. During the Iran hostage crisis, Read was part of the State Department team dedicated to freeing the hostages.

After leaving government service, Read dedicated himself to environmental issues. He was a driving force behind the Earth Summit, held in Rio de Janeiro in June 1992. He was the president of Ecofund '92, a group founded in connection with the Earth Summit.

Read died of complications from liver disease at George Washington University Hospital in Washington, D.C., on March 18, 1993.

Government offices
Preceded by New Office	Under Secretary of State for Management; October 1, 1978 – January 19, 1981	Succeeded by Richard T. Kennedy
