= Richard T. Kennedy =

4th Under Secretary of State for Management
- In office February 28, 1981 – December 15, 1982
- Preceded by: Benjamin H. Read
- Succeeded by: Jerome W. Van Gorkom

Personal details
- Born: December 24, 1919 Rochester, New York
- Died: January 12, 1998 (aged 78) Washington, DC
- Education: University of Rochester (BA); Harvard University (MBA)

Richard Thomas Kennedy (24 December 1919 – 12 January 1998) was a United States soldier and diplomat.

== Biography ==
Richard T. Kennedy was born in Rochester, New York, on December 24, 1919. He was educated at the University of Rochester, receiving a B.A. in economics in 1941.

After college Kennedy enlisted in the United States Army, where he would remain for the next three decades. During World War II, he saw action in North Africa and Italy. He stayed in Europe after the war as part of the Allied occupation of Germany. While still a member of the army, he attended Harvard Business School and received an M.B.A. in 1953. He would also go on to study at the United States Army Command and General Staff College and the National War College. In the late 1950s, he served as a financial adviser in Iran and as a specialist in African affairs.

In 1961, Kennedy was posted as a staff officer in the Office of the Assistant to United States Secretary of Defense Robert McNamara. From 1964 to 1969, he served in the Office of the Assistant Secretary of Defense for International Security Affairs, first as assistant director for the Africa Region, then as deputy director, and finally as director. In 1969, Kennedy was appointed Deputy Assistant to the President for National Security Council Planning and became a senior member of the staff of the United States National Security Council. Kennedy retired from the army in 1971 with the rank of colonel. He stayed on as a member of the NSC staff and deputy assistant to the president until 1975. In 1975, he was appointed as a commissioner of the newly established Nuclear Regulatory Commission, where he served until 1980.

President of the United States Ronald Reagan nominated Kennedy as Under Secretary of State for Management shortly after his inauguration, and Kennedy held this office from February 28, 1981, until December 15, 1982. Reagan then appointed Kennedy as an ambassador-at-large focused on the issue of nuclear nonproliferation. In this capacity, he began consultations with the Soviet Union that would ultimately climax in the Intermediate-Range Nuclear Forces Treaty of 1987 and START I in 1991. As Ambassador-at-Large, he led the U.S. response to the 1986 Chernobyl disaster. He also played a key role in the negotiations that led to the dismantling of South Africa's nuclear weapons program in 1989. He also began nuclear cooperation talks with China, and negotiated nuclear agreements with Japan and the European Atomic Energy Community.

Ambassador Kennedy retired in 1993. He died at Georgetown University Hospital in Washington, D.C., on January 12, 1998, of complications with heart bypass surgery. He is buried in Arlington National Cemetery.

Government offices
Preceded by Benjamin H. Read	Under Secretary of State for Management; February 28, 1981 – December 15, 1982	Succeeded by Jerome W. Van Gorkom
