= Charles McKinley Saltzman =

United States Army general (1871–1942)

Charles M. Saltzman
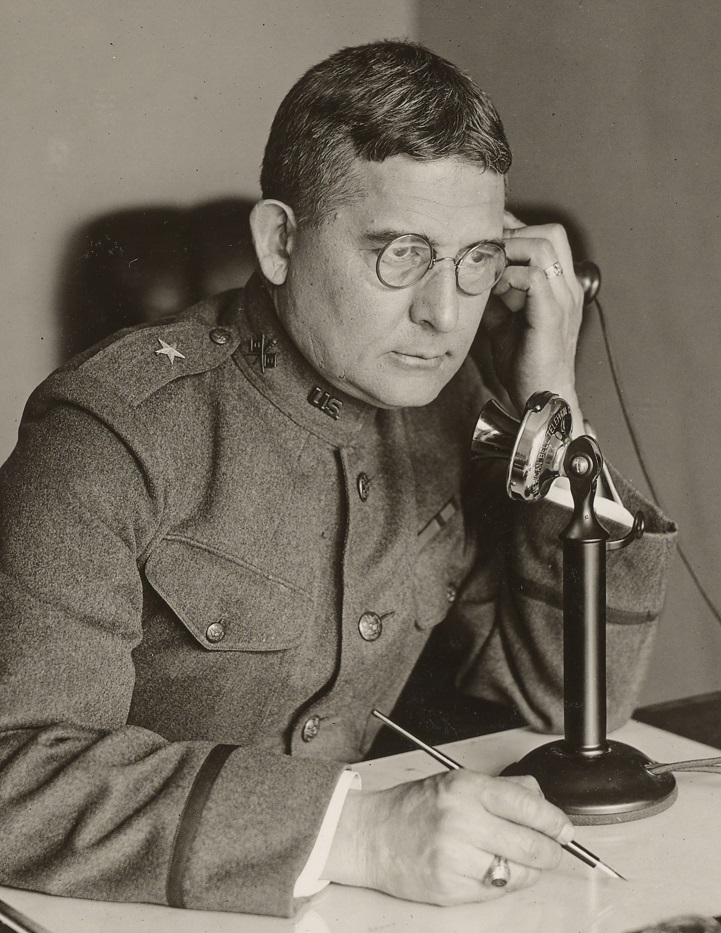
- Brigadier General Charles M. Saltzman in May 1918
- Born: October 18, 1871; Panora, Iowa, US
- Died: November 25, 1942 (aged 71); Washington, D.C., US
- Burial place: Arlington National Cemetery
- Relatives: Charles E. Saltzman (son)
- Military career
- Allegiance: United States
- Branch: United States Army; Signal Corps
- Service years: 1896–1928
- Rank: Major General
- Service number: 0-249
- Conflicts: Spanish–American War; Moro Rebellion; World War I
- Awards: Distinguished Service Medal; 2 x Citation Star

Charles McKinley Saltzman (18 October 1871 – 25 November 1942) was an American Major General. He participated in several military campaigns and held the office of Chief Signal Officer.

== Military career ==
Charles M. Saltzman was commissioned as a second lieutenant of cavalry from the United States Military Academy in 1896. He was assigned to the Cavalry and served with the 1st Cavalry in Cuba, where he earned two Silver Stars for gallantry during the Battle of Las Guasimas and Santiago in 1898.

Saltzman became signal officer in General Leonard Woods staff and participated in the US campaign during the Moro Rebellion in the Philippine–American War. 1912 in London he was a delegate of the United States for the International Radiotelegraph Convention.

With the entry of the United States in World War I in 1918, Saltzman was transferred to the Division of Military Aeronautics. After the retirement of Chief Signal Officer George Owen Squier in 1924, Saltzmann was appointed as successor and held the post of Chief Signal Officer until his own retirement in 1928.

== Civilian career ==
US President Herbert Hoover nominated Charles M. Saltzman for the Federal Radio Commission, where he acted as chairman from 1930 to 1932.

== Death and legacy ==
He died on 25 November 1942 in Washington, D.C. Saltzman was buried in Arlington National Cemetery with his wife, Mary Eskridge Saltzman.

== Biography ==
- Davis, Henry Blaine Jr. (1998). Generals in Khaki. Raleigh, North Carolina: Pentland Press. ISBN 1571970886. OCLC 40298151.
