= John F. W. Rogers =

American businessman (born 1956)

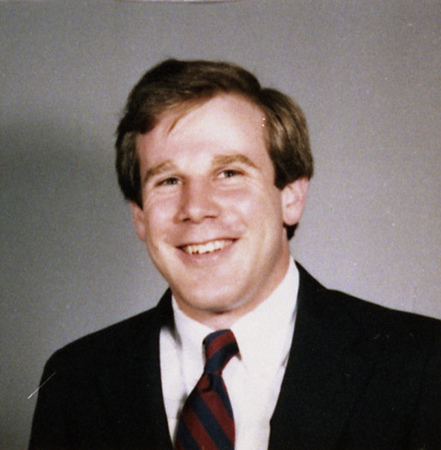
- Rogers in September 1983

8th Under Secretary of State for Management
- In office October 9, 1991 – January 19, 1993
- President: George H. W. Bush
- Minister: James Baker; Lawrence Eagleburger
- Preceded by: Ivan Selin
- Succeeded by: J. Brian Atwood

Assistant Secretary of the Treasury
- In office 1985–1987
- President: Ronald Reagan
- Minister: James Baker

Secretary to the Board of Directors of Goldman Sachs
- Incumbent
- Assumed office 2019

Personal details
- Born: John Francis William Rogers; April 15, 1956 (age 70) Seneca Falls, New York, U.S.
- Party: Republican
- Spouse: Deborah Lehr
- Children: 2
- Education: George Washington University
- Occupation: Businessman
- Awards: Presidential Citizen Medal

John Francis William Rogers (born April 15, 1956) is an American businessman, serving as executive vice president, chief of staff, and secretary to the board of Goldman Sachs.

== Early life and education ==
Rogers was born on April 15, 1956 in Seneca Falls, New York, where his father owned a wholesale frozen foods business and his mother was a dental hygienist. He is a graduate of George Washington University.

== Career ==
=== Federal government ===
Rogers has held posts in multiple U.S. government administrations. He was a research assistant for President Gerald Ford's director of communications David Gergen, then to Arthur F. Burns, and later to President Ronald Reagan, when at age 27 he became the youngest person to hold that position. When Reagan's chief of staff, James Baker, became Secretary of the Treasury, he took Rogers with him; Rogers was the Assistant Secretary of the Treasury from 1985 to 1987. From 1991 to 1993, during George H. W. Bush's administration, Rogers served as Under Secretary of State for Management.

=== Goldman Sachs ===
In 1994, Rogers joined Goldman Sachs in its Fixed Income Division and eventually became the chief of staff to CEOs Jon S. Corzine, Henry Paulson, Lloyd Blankfein, and David M. Solomon. He was made a partner in 2000, and "has no revenue-generating responsibilities and strives to have virtually no public profile." He is said to have been United States Treasury Secretary Paulson's closest advisor while at Goldman, as well as a member of United States Secretary of State James Baker's inner circle.

In 2011, CEO Lloyd Blankfein named Rogers one of the eleven executives of the firm. As of 2019, he was executive vice president, chief of staff and secretary to the board of directors at Goldman as well as serving as chairman of the board of directors of the Atlantic Council, the American Atlanticist international affairs think tank. Rogers is a life trustee and the treasurer of the Ronald Reagan Presidential Library. He also serves as Vice Chairman of the Board of the White House Historical Association, and Vice Chairman of the Board of the American Academy in Rome. In September 2019, Rogers was one of the US financial community representatives invited to the White House state dinner for Prime Minister of Australia Scott Morrison. In November 2019, he assisted 2020 Democratic Party presidential candidates to show that American small business was on their agenda.

In April 2020, Rogers hosted the inauguration of The Finance 202, a new lobbying group for small businesses. In 2020, he was appointed as the Chair of the Securities Industry and Financial Markets Association (SIFMA) Board of Directors for the year 2021.

== Awards ==
In February 2020, Rogers was awarded the ICAA Arthur Ross Award in the patronage category, for his support of historic preservation.

== Personal life ==
Rogers owns a home on Embassy Row in Washington, D.C., and is married to Deborah Lehr, with whom he has two children. Lehr was a former senior negotiator in the Clinton Administration on China trade policy. In 2018, Rogers and Lehr attended President Trump's state dinner with President Emmanuel Macron of France.

According to a 2006 profile in The New York Times, Rogers, who is interested in historic preservation, "does not welcome public scrutiny" and hates being photographed.

Government offices
Preceded by Ivan Selin	Under Secretary of State for Management; October 9, 1991 – January 19, 1993	Succeeded by J. Brian Atwood
