= Under Secretary of State for Management =

Political office in the United States

United States Under Secretary of State for Management
- Seal of the United States Department of State

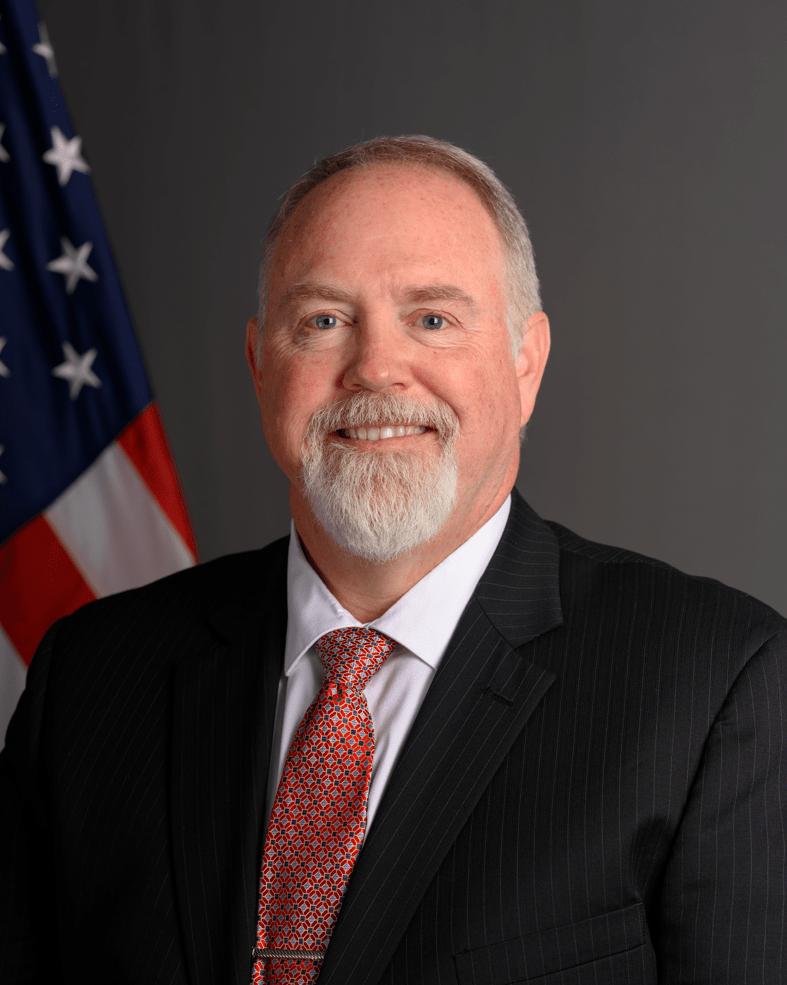
- Incumbent; Jason S. Evans since September 22, 2025
- United States Department of State
- Reports to: The secretary of state
- Seat: Washington, D.C.
- Appointer: The president; with Senate advice and consent
- Term length: No fixed term
- Inaugural holder: Donold Lourie
- Formation: February 7, 1953
- Salary: Executive Schedule, Level 3
- Website: state.gov/m

The under secretary of state for management (M) is a position within the United States Department of State that serves as principal adviser to the secretary of state and deputy secretary of state on matters relating to the allocation and use of Department of State budget, physical property, and personnel, including planning, the day-to-day administration of the Department, and proposals for institutional reform and modernization.

The under secretary is appointed by the president of the United States with the consent of the United States Senate to serve at the request of the president.

== Overview ==
The under secretary of state for management is the State Department's representative on the President's Management Council, and is the department official responsible for implementing the President's Management Agenda.

== History ==
In an Act of February 7, 1953, Congress created for a 2-year period the position of Under Secretary of State for Administration as the third ranking officer in the department. The position was not renewed, however; and between 1955 and 1978, the ranking officer in the department handling administration and management questions was either a deputy under secretary or an assistant secretary of state. On October 7, 1978, an act of Congress created the permanent position of Under Secretary of State for Management.

== Reporting officials ==
Officials reporting to the Under Secretary of State for Management (M) include:

Official	Department	Department Code
Assistant Secretary of State for Administration	Bureau of Administration	(A)
Assistant Secretary of State for Consular Affairs	Bureau of Consular Affairs	(CA)
Assistant Secretary of State for Diplomatic Security	Bureau of Diplomatic Security	(DS)
Director General of the Foreign Service and Director of Global Talent	Bureau of Global Talent Management	(GTM)
Chief Information Officer	Bureau of Information Resource Management	(IRM)
Comptroller	Bureau of the Comptroller and Global Financial Services	(CGFS)
Director of Overseas Buildings Operations	Bureau of Overseas Buildings Operations	(OBO)
Director of the National Foreign Affairs Training Center	National Foreign Affairs Training Center	(FSI)
Director of Budget and Planning	Bureau of Budget and Planning	(BP)
Director of Management Strategy and Solutions	Office of Management Strategy and Solutions	(M/SS)
Chief Medical Officer / Designated Agency Safety and Health Official	Bureau of Medical Services	(MED)
Director of the Office of Foreign Missions, with the rank of Ambassador	Office of Foreign Missions	(M/OFM)
Director of Diplomatic Reception Rooms	Office of Fine Arts	(M/FA)
K-Fund Manager	Office of Emergencies in the Diplomatic and Consular Service	(M/EDCS)
White House Liaison of the Department of State	Office of White House Liaison	(M/WHL)

== Officeholders ==
The table below includes both the various titles of this post over time, as well as all the holders of those offices.

Under Secretary of State for Management
#	Portrait	Name	Assuming office	Left office	President(s) served under
Under Secretary of State for Administration
1		Donold B. Lourie	February 16, 1953	March 5, 1954	Dwight D. Eisenhower
2		Charles E. Saltzman	June 29, 1954	December 31, 1954	Dwight D. Eisenhower
	Under Secretary of State for Management				
3		Benjamin H. Read	October 1, 1978	January 19, 1981	Jimmy Carter
4		Richard T. Kennedy	February 28, 1981	December 15, 1982	Ronald Reagan
5		Jerome W. Van Gorkom	December 22, 1982	October 14, 1983	Ronald Reagan
6		Ronald I. Spiers	November 23, 1983	May 15, 1989	Ronald Reagan; George H. W. Bush
7		Ivan Selin	May 23, 1989	June 23, 1991	George H. W. Bush
8		John F. W. Rogers	October 9, 1991	January 19, 1993	George H. W. Bush
9		J. Brian Atwood	April 1, 1993	May 10, 1993	Bill Clinton
10		Richard M. Moose	August 2, 1993	September 1, 1996	Bill Clinton
-		Patrick F. Kennedy (Acting)	September 1, 1996	August 20, 1997	Bill Clinton
11		Bonnie R. Cohen	August 20, 1997	January 20, 2001	Bill Clinton
12		Grant S. Green, Jr.	March 30, 2001	January 25, 2005	George W. Bush
13		Henrietta H. Fore	August 2, 2005	November 15, 2007	George W. Bush
14		Patrick F. Kennedy	November 15, 2007	January 26, 2017	George W. Bush; Barack Obama; Donald Trump
-		William E. Todd (Acting)	February 1, 2018	May 17, 2019	Donald Trump
15		Brian Bulatao	May 17, 2019	January 20, 2021	Donald Trump
-		Carol Z. Perez (Acting)	January 20, 2021	December 29, 2021	Joe Biden
16		John R. Bass	December 29, 2021	January 20, 2025	Joe Biden
-		Tibor P. Nagy (Acting)	January 20, 2025	April 4, 2025	Donald Trump
-		José Cunningham (Acting)	April 5, 2025	September 22, 2025	Donald Trump
17		Jason S. Evans	September 22, 2025	Incumbent	Donald Trump
