= Charles E. Saltzman =

United States Army general

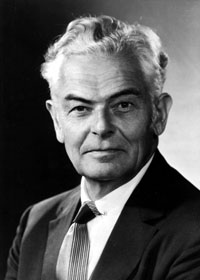

2nd Under Secretary of State for Administration
- In office June 29, 1954 – December 31, 1954
- Preceded by: Donold Lourie
- Succeeded by: Benjamin H. Read

Assistant Secretary of State for Occupied Areas
- In office 1947–1949
- Preceded by: John H. Hilldring
- Succeeded by: Office abolished

Personal details
- Born: Charles Eskridge Saltzman; September 19, 1903 Zamboanga City, Philippines
- Died: June 16, 1994 (aged 90) New York, New York
- Spouses: Gertrude Lamont (m. 1931; div. 1947) Cynthia Southall Myrick (1947–1969) Clotilde Knapp McCormick (m. 1978)
- Children: 4
- Parent(s): Charles McKinley Saltzman; Mary Eskridge Saltzman
- Education: Cornell University
- Alma mater: United States Military Academy; Magdalen College, Oxford

Military service
- Allegiance: United States
- Branch/service: United States Army
- Years of service: 1925–1955
- Rank: Brigadier general

Charles Eskridge Saltzman (September 19, 1903 – June 16, 1994) was an American soldier, businessman and State Department official.

== Early life and education ==
Saltzman was born on September 19, 1903, in Zamboanga City in the Philippines, where his father, Charles McKinley Saltzman, was a captain in the Signal Corps of the United States Army, serving on the staff of Major General Leonard Wood. His mother was Mary Peyton (née Eskridge) Saltzman (the niece of brevet Brig. Gen. Hazard Stevens and the granddaughter of Army general Isaac Stevens). Saltzman's father's military career meant that he lived in a variety of places growing up: the Philippines, Washington, D.C., New York City, and Panama.

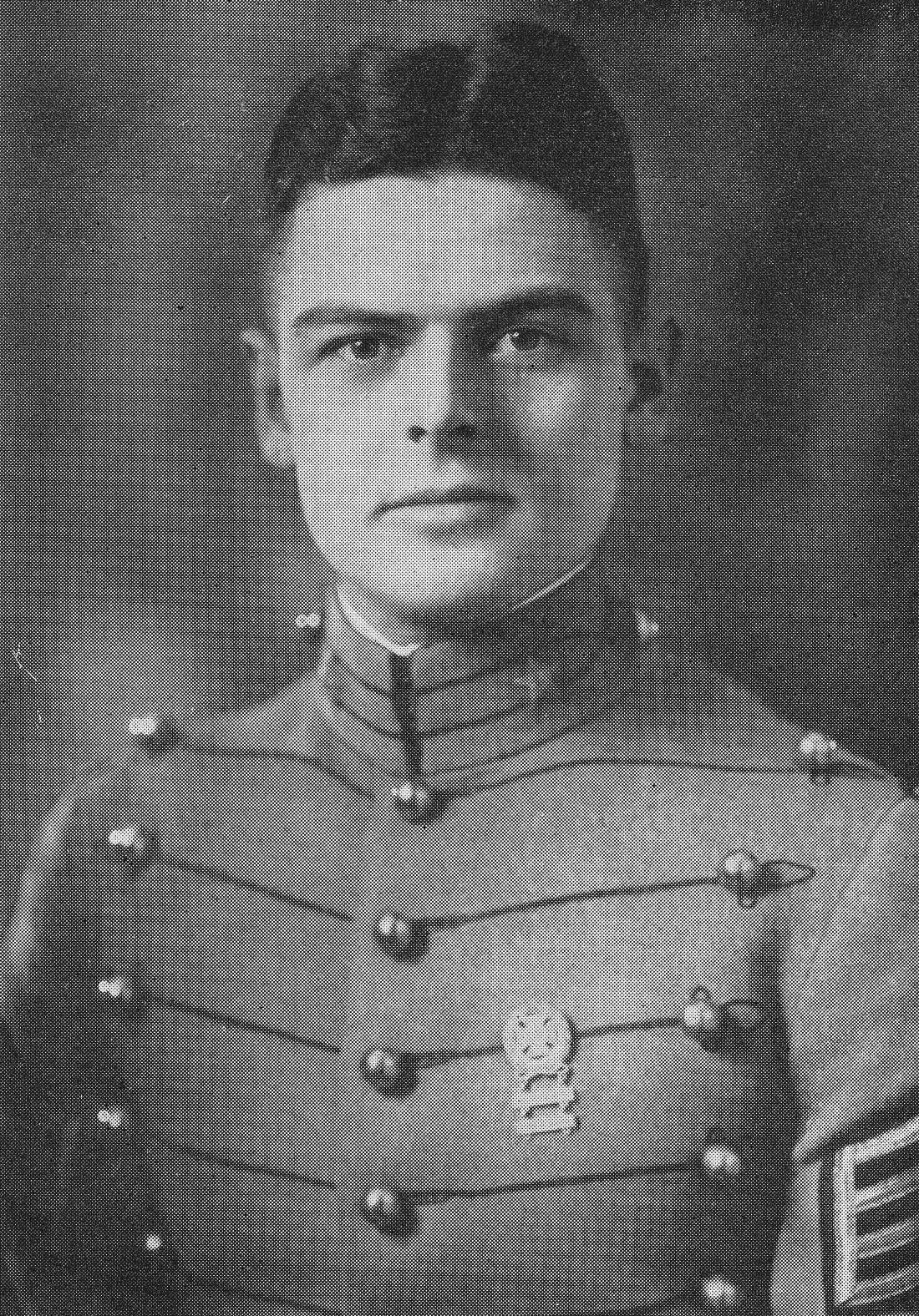
At West Point in 1925

When Saltzman was five years old, in September 1908, he was present at Fort Myer for the Wright brothers' demonstration of manned flight in an event arranged by Saltzman's father. Saltzman's father served as chairman of the Federal Radio Commission from 1930 to 1932.

After graduating from high school in New York, Saltzman spent a year at Cornell University and then entered the United States Military Academy at West Point. After graduating in 1925, Saltzman was a Rhodes scholar, studying at Magdalen College, Oxford and receiving a bachelor's degree in 1928.

== Career ==
After Saltzman completed his studies, the United States Army posted him to Camp A.A. Humphreys where he served as a lieutenant in a combat engineer company. At the same time, he served as a White House aide as an assistant to Campbell B. Hodges, a military aide of President of the United States Herbert Hoover. In this capacity, he served as an escort at state dinners.

Saltzman left the army in 1930, joining the New York Telephone Company as an engineer and manager, though he remained a member of the United States Army Reserve, later transferring to the Army National Guard. In 1935, he joined the New York Stock Exchange as an assistant to the executive vice president. He was later promoted to secretary and then to vice president of the NYSE.

Saltzman's National Guard unit was called to active service in October 1940. After the Attack on Pearl Harbor in December 1941, he was appointed assistant to the chief signal officer in the United States Department of War. He was posted overseas in May 1942, first in London, then in North Africa, where he served on the staff of Lt. Gen. Mark W. Clark. He was Lt. Gen. Clark's deputy chief of staff, first in North Africa, and later in Italy. He stayed in Europe after the war as part of the Allied occupation of Austria, returning to the U.S. and leaving the military in 1946. He remained a member of the Reserves until 1955, retiring with the rank of major general.

Saltzman briefly returned to the New York Stock Exchange before President of the United States Harry Truman in 1947 appointed him Assistant Secretary of State for Occupied Areas under United States Secretary of State George Marshall.

Saltzman left the United States Department of State in 1949, becoming a member of the venture capital firm of Henry Sears & Co. During the 1952 presidential election, Saltzman and Sears worked with Sears' brother-in-law Sen. Henry Cabot Lodge Jr. (R—MA) to raise money for Dwight D. Eisenhower.

In 1954, Secretary of State John Foster Dulles appointed Saltzman to a committee tasked with studying personnel administration in the United States Department of State. After the committee issued its recommendations, President Eisenhower named Saltzman Under Secretary of State for Administration to implement the committee's recommendations; Saltzman held this office from June 29, 1954, through December 31, 1954.

Saltzman became a partner at Goldman Sachs in 1956, working there until his retirement in 1973.

== Personal life ==
Saltzman was married three times and had three children. In 1931, Saltzman was married to Gertrude Lamont (1910–1994) by the Rev. Dr. Anson Phelps Stokes, canon of the Washington Cathedral in the drawing room of the Lamont home in Kalorama Circle. Gertrude was a daughter of Robert Patterson Lamont, the U.S. Secretary of Commerce under President Herbert Hoover, who attended the wedding. After sixteen years of marriage, they divorced in 1947. They were the parents of:

- Charles McKinley Saltzman II (b. 1937), a Harvard graduate who became the headmaster of the Madeira School in McLean, Virginia (after the previous Head Mistress Jean Harris, was arrested for the murder of Herman Tarnower).

On September 25, 1947, he was married to Cynthia Southall Myrick (b. 1921) at Christ Methodist Church on Park Avenue in New York City. Cynthia was a daughter of Marian Susan Washburn and Julian Southall Myrick, president of the Metropolitan Life Insurance Company. They remained married until 1969 and were the parents of:

- Cynthia Myrick Saltzman (b. 1949), who married Warren Motley II in 1972.
- Richard Stevens Saltzman (1951–1965)
- Penelope Washburn Saltzman, a lawyer who married Stuart Abbott Billings, an architect, in 1985.

In 1978, he married Clotilde (née Knapp) McCormick (1908–2004), the former Countess von Francken-Sierstorpff. They were married until his death in 1994.

Saltzman died from a heart attack at his home in New York on June 16, 1994.

=== Honors and legacy ===
Saltzman was awarded the Distinguished Service Medal, the Legion of Merit, the Order of the British Empire, the Croix de Guerre, the Polish Cross of Merit, the Order of the Crown of Italy and the Brazilian War Medal.

Government offices
Preceded by John H. Hilldring	Assistant Secretary of State for Occupied Areas; 1947–1949	Succeeded by Office abolished
Preceded by Donold Lourie	Under Secretary of State for Administration; June 29, 1954 – December 31, 1954	Succeeded by Office abolished
