= Margaret MacDonald =

Margaret MacDonald, Macdonald or McDonald may refer to:

- Margaret MacDonald (visionary) (1815 – c. 1840), Scottish charismatic
- Margaret Macdonald Mackintosh (1865–1933), Scottish artist
- Margaret MacDonald (social reformer) (1870–1911), British feminist, social reformer, and wife of Labour politician Ramsay MacDonald
- Margaret MacDonald (nurse) (1873–1948), Canadian nurse
- Margaret MacDonald (servant) (1904–1993), nursemaid and later dresser to Queen Elizabeth II
- Margaret MacDonald (philosopher) (1903–1956), British philosopher
- Margaret Mary Macdonald (1910–1968), Canadian politician
- Margaret MacDonald (politician) (born 1951), American politician
- Maggie Macdonald (1952–2016), Scottish singer
- Maggie MacDonald (born 1978), Canadian writer and musician
- Margaret McDonald (voice actress) (born 1988), American voice actress
- Margaret Read MacDonald (born 1940), American storyteller, folklorist, and author of children's books
- Margaret Evangeline McDonald, ambassador to the United States from the Bahamas
- Rena MacDonald (Margaret Catherine MacDonald, 1907–1958), American shot putter and discus thrower
- Margaret McDonald (writer), Scottish author
