= The Bahamas–United States relations =

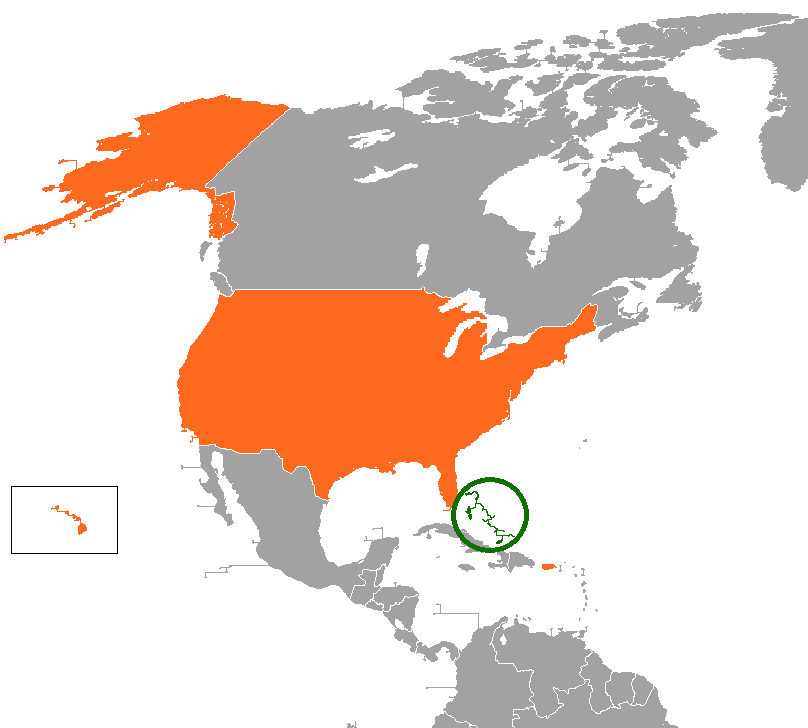

- Bahamas: United States

Diplomatic mission
- Bahamas Embassy, Washington, D.C.: United States Embassy, Nassau

Envoy
- Ambassador of The Bahamas to the United States Sidney S. Collie: Ambassador of the United States to the Bahamas Herschel Walker

The Bahamas–United States relations are bilateral relations between the Commonwealth of The Bahamas and the United States of America.

== History ==
The Bahamas and the United States established diplomatic relations in 1973, shortly after The Bahamas gained independence that same year. Historically, they have had close economic and commercial relations. The countries share ethnic and cultural ties, especially in education, and the Bahamas is home to approximately 30,000 American residents. In addition, there are about 110 U.S.-related businesses in the Bahamas and, in 2005, 87% of the 5 million tourists visiting the Bahamas were American.

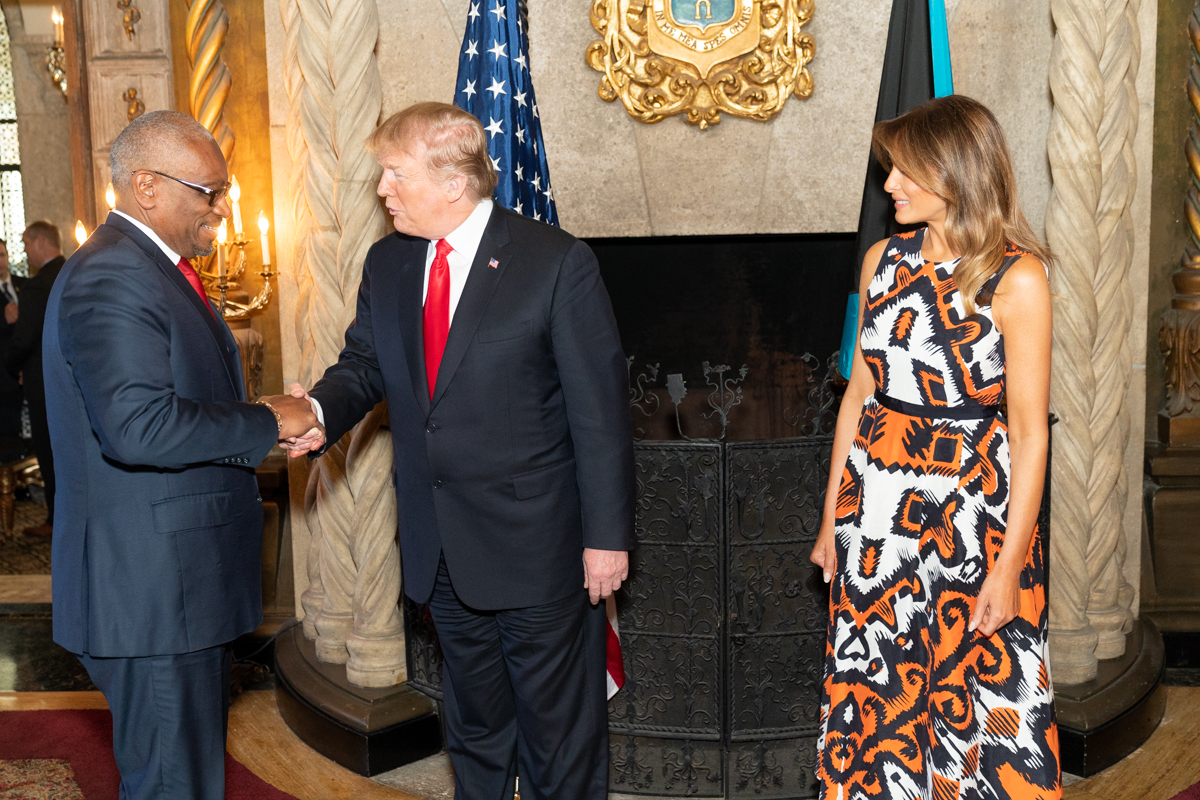
U.S. President Donald Trump and First Lady Melania Trump meet with Bahamian Prime Minister Hubert Minnis in Palm Beach, Florida, in March 2019

As a neighbor, The Bahamas and its political stability are important to the United States. The U.S. and The Bahamian government have worked together on reducing crime and addressing migration issues. With the closest island Bimini only 45 miles from the coast of Florida, The Bahamas often is used as a gateway for drugs and illegal aliens bound for the United States. The United States and the Bahamas cooperate to handle these threats. U.S. assistance and resources have been essential to Bahamian efforts to mitigate the persistent flow of illegal narcotics and migrants through the archipelago. The United States and The Bahamas also actively cooperate on law enforcement, civil aviation, marine research, meteorology, and agricultural issues. The U.S. Navy operates an underwater research facility on Andros Island.

The Department of Homeland Security's Bureau of Customs and Border Protection maintains "pre-clearance" facilities at the airports in Nassau and Freeport. Travelers to the U.S. are interviewed and inspected before departure, allowing faster connection times in the U.S.

Bahamas-USA relations were affected on March 6, 2025, when debris from a SpaceX Starship rocket, which exploded shortly after liftoff in Texas, fell into Bahamian airspace. The Bahamian government reported that the debris landed in the Southern Bahamas. SpaceX implemented contingency measures, including ongoing communication with Bahamian officials, and assured that the debris contained no toxic materials and would not impact marine life or water quality. SpaceX teams were scheduled to arrive in the Bahamas for debris recovery and cleanup efforts, with the Department of Environmental Planning and Protection overseeing the process.

== Principal U.S. officials ==
- Ambassador – Herschel Walker
- Deputy Chief of Mission – Kimberly Furnish

== Diplomatic missions ==
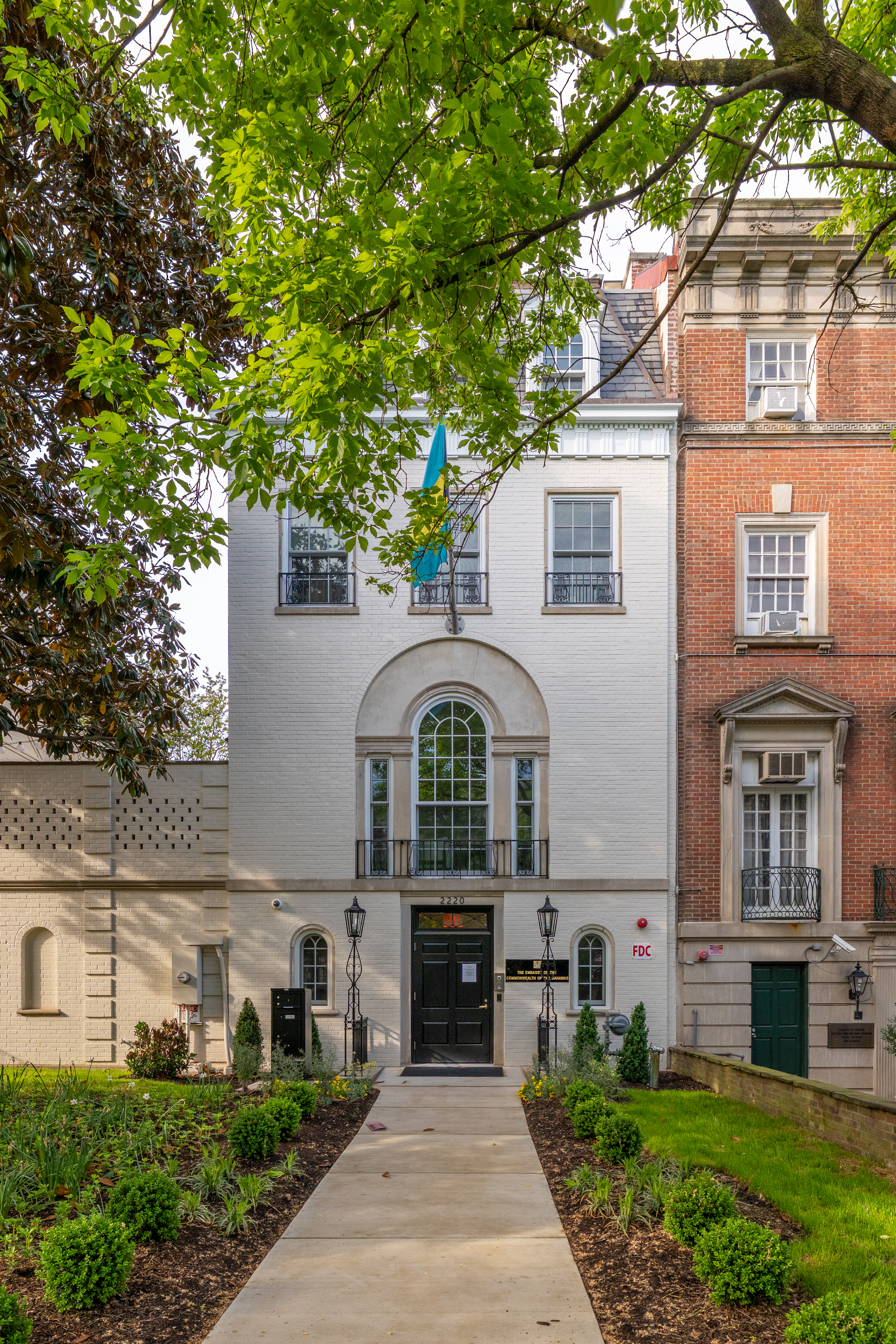
Embassy of the Bahamas, Washington, D.C.

The Embassy of The Bahamas in Washington, D.C. is the diplomatic mission of the Commonwealth of The Bahamas to the United States. It is located at 2220 Massachusetts Avenue, Northwest, Washington, D.C., in the Embassy Row neighborhood. The embassy also operates Consulates-General in Atlanta, Miami, New York City and Washington D.C. Since March 2022, the Ambassador of Bahamas to the U.S. has been Wendall K. Jones.

The U.S. Embassy for The Bahamas is located in Nassau, New Providence Island, The Bahamas.

== See also ==
- North American Free Trade Agreement
- Free Trade Area of the Americas
- Third Border Initiative
- Caribbean Community
- Caribbean Basin Initiative (CBI)
- Caribbean Basin Trade Partnership Act
- Western Hemisphere Travel Initiative
- Foreign relations of the United States
- Foreign relations of The Bahamas
