= Maxine Waters =

American politician (born 1938)

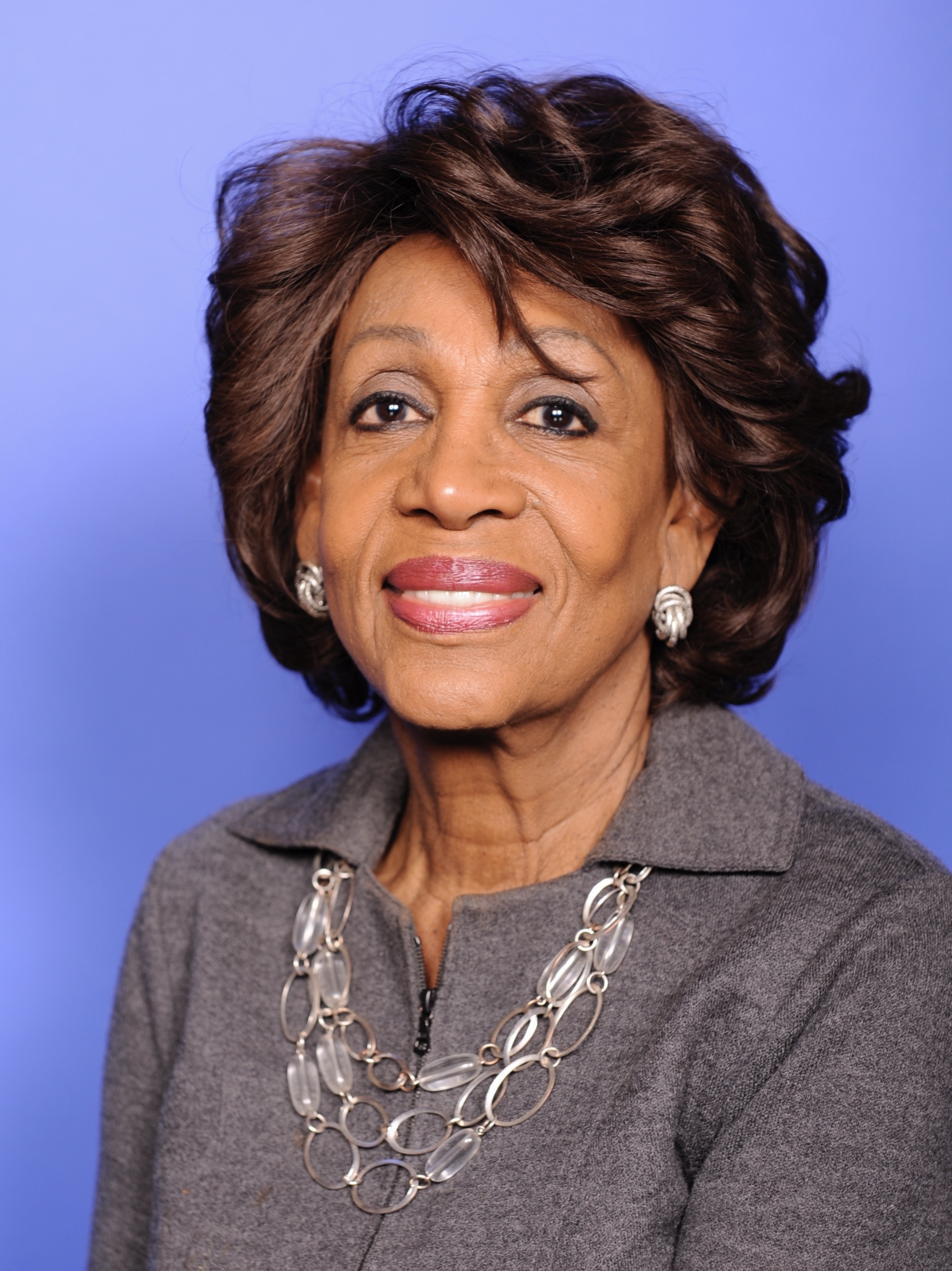
- Official portrait, 2012

Ranking Member of the House Financial Services Committee
- Incumbent
- Assumed office January 3, 2023
- Preceded by: Patrick McHenry
- In office January 3, 2013 – January 3, 2019
- Preceded by: Barney Frank
- Succeeded by: Patrick McHenry

Chair of the House Financial Services Committee
- In office January 3, 2019 – January 3, 2023
- Preceded by: Jeb Hensarling
- Succeeded by: Patrick McHenry

Chair of the Congressional Black Caucus
- In office January 3, 1997 – January 3, 1999
- Preceded by: Donald M. Payne
- Succeeded by: Jim Clyburn

Member of the U.S. House of Representatives from California
- Incumbent
- Assumed office January 3, 1991
- Preceded by: Augustus Hawkins
- Constituency: 29th district (1991–1993); 35th district (1993–2013); 43rd district (2013–present)

Member of the California State Assembly from the 48th district
- In office December 6, 1976 – November 30, 1990
- Preceded by: Leon D. Ralph
- Succeeded by: Marguerite Archie-Hudson

Personal details
- Born: Maxine Moore Carr; August 15, 1938 (age 88) St. Louis, Missouri, U.S.
- Party: Democratic
- Spouses: Edward Waters (m. 1956; div. 1972); Sid Williams (m. 1977)
- Children: 2
- Education: California State University, Los Angeles (BA)
- Website: House website
- Waters' voice Waters on humanitarian aid to Mozambique after the 2000 flood. Recorded March 14, 2000

Maxine Moore Waters (née Carr; born August 15, 1938) is an American politician serving as the U.S. representative for California's 43rd congressional district since 1991. The district, numbered as the 29th district from 1991 to 1993 and as the 35th district from 1993 to 2013, includes much of southern Los Angeles, as well as portions of Gardena, Inglewood and Torrance.

A member of the Democratic Party, Waters is in her 18th House term. She is the most senior of the 13 black women serving in Congress, and chaired the Congressional Black Caucus from 1997 to 1999. She is the most senior member of the California congressional delegation, making her dean, upon the expiration of Nancy Pelosi's term in January 2027. She chaired the House Financial Services Committee from 2019 to 2023 and has been the ranking member since 2023.

Before becoming a U.S. representative, Waters served seven terms in the California State Assembly, to which she was first elected in 1976. As an assemblywoman, she advocated divestment from South Africa's apartheid regime. In Congress, she was an outspoken opponent of the Iraq War and has sharply criticized Presidents George H. W. Bush, Bill Clinton, George W. Bush, Barack Obama, and Donald Trump, whom she has consistently denounced.

Waters was included in Time magazine's list of "100 Most Influential People of 2018."

== Early life and education ==
Waters was born in 1938 in St. Louis, Missouri, the daughter of Remus Carr and Velma Lee (née Moore). The fifth of 13 children, she was raised by her single mother after her father left the family when Maxine was two. She graduated from Vashon High School in St. Louis before moving with her family to Los Angeles in 1961. She worked in a garment factory and as a telephone operator before being hired as an assistant teacher with the Head Start program in Watts in 1966. Waters later enrolled at Los Angeles State College (now California State University, Los Angeles), where she received a bachelor's degree in sociology in 1971.

== Early political career ==
In 1973, Waters went to work as chief deputy to City Councilman David S. Cunningham Jr. She was elected to the California State Assembly in 1976. In the Assembly, she worked for the divestment of state pension funds from any businesses active in South Africa, a country then operating under the policy of apartheid, and helped pass legislation within the guidelines of the divestment campaign's Sullivan Principles. She ascended to the position of Democratic Caucus Chair for the Assembly.

== U.S. House of Representatives ==
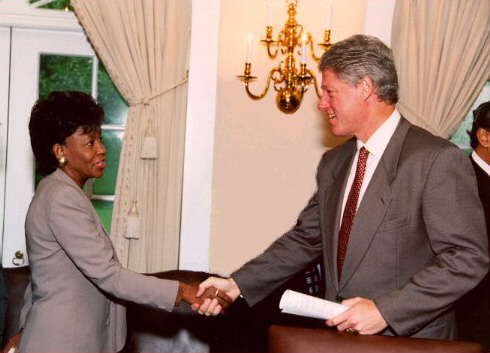
Waters greeting President Bill Clinton in 1994

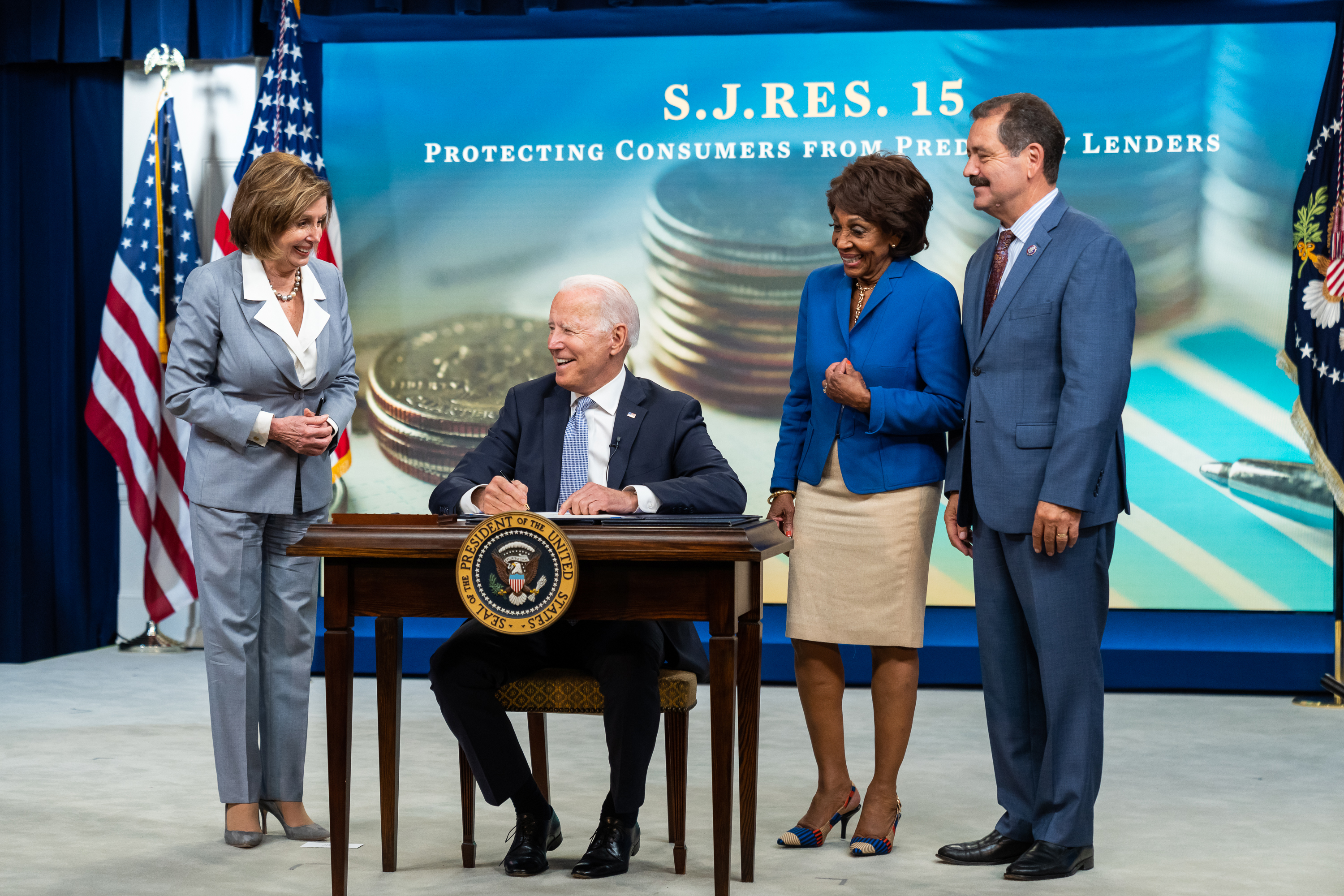
Waters watches as President Joe Biden signs the Methane, Equal Employment Opportunity Commission and True Lender CRA Bills in 2021

=== Elections ===
Upon the retirement of Augustus F. Hawkins in 1990, Waters was elected to the United States House of Representatives for California's 29th congressional district with over 79% of the vote. She has been reelected consistently from this district, renumbered as the 35th district in 1992 and as the 43rd in 2012, with at least 70% of the vote.

Waters has represented large parts of south-central Los Angeles and the Los Angeles coastal communities of Westchester and Playa Del Rey, as well as the cities of Torrance, Gardena, Hawthorne, Inglewood and Lawndale.

=== Tenure ===
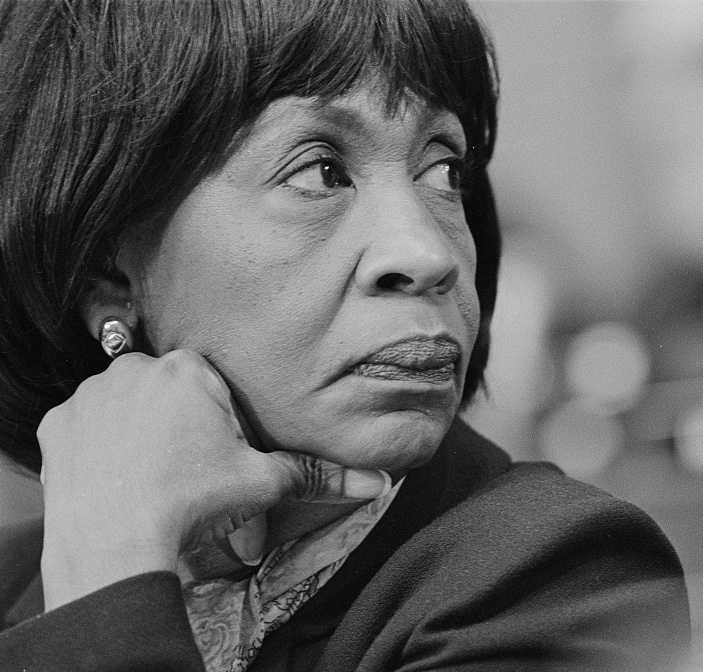
Waters at a 1998 House Committee on the Judiciary hearing during the Impeachment inquiry against Bill Clinton

On July 29, 1994, Waters came to public attention when she repeatedly interrupted a speech by Representative Peter King. The presiding officer, Carrie Meek, classed her behavior as "unruly and turbulent" and threatened to have the Sergeant at Arms present her with the Mace of the House of Representatives, the equivalent of a formal warning to desist. As of 2017, this is the most recent instance of the mace being employed for a disciplinary purpose. Waters was eventually suspended from the House for the rest of the day. The conflict with King stemmed from the previous day, when they had both been present at a House Banking Committee hearing on the Whitewater controversy. Waters felt King's questioning of Maggie Williams (Hillary Clinton's chief of staff) was too harsh, and they subsequently exchanged hostile words.

Waters chaired the Congressional Black Caucus from 1997 to 1998. In 2005, she testified at the Committee on Education and the Workforce hearings on "Enforcement of Federal Anti-Fraud Laws in For-Profit Education", highlighting the American College of Medical Technology as a "problem school" in her district. In 2006, she was involved in the debate over King Drew Medical Center. She criticized media coverage of the hospital and asked the Federal Communications Commission (FCC) to deny a waiver of the cross ownership ban, and hence license renewal for KTLA, a station the Los Angeles Times owned. She said, "The Los Angeles Times has had an inordinate effect on public opinion and has used it to harm the local community in specific instances." She requested that the FCC force the paper to either sell its station or risk losing that station's broadcast rights. According to Broadcasting & Cable, the challenges raised "the specter of costly legal battles to defend station holdings... At a minimum, defending against one would cost tens of thousands of dollars in lawyers' fees and probably delay license renewal about three months". Waters' petition was unsuccessful.

As a Democratic representative in Congress, Waters was a superdelegate to the 2008 Democratic National Convention. She endorsed Democratic U.S. Senator Hillary Clinton for the party's nomination in late January 2008, granting Clinton nationally recognized support that some suggested would "make big waves." Waters later switched her endorsement to U.S. Senator Barack Obama when his lead in the pledged delegate count became insurmountable on the final day of primary voting.

In 2009 Waters had a confrontation with Representative Dave Obey over an earmark in the United States House Committee on Appropriations. The funding request was for a public school employment training center in Los Angeles that was named after her. In 2011, Waters voted against the National Defense Authorization Act for Fiscal Year 2012, related to a controversial provision that allows the government and the military to detain American citizens and others indefinitely without trial.

Upon Barney Frank's retirement in 2012, Waters became the ranking member of the House Financial Services Committee. On July 24, 2013, she voted in favor of Amendment 100 in H.R. 2397 Department of Defense Appropriations Act of 2014. The amendment targeted domestic surveillance activities, specifically that of the National Security Agency, and would have limited the flexibility of the NSA's interpretation of the law to collect sweeping data on U.S. citizens. Amendment 100 was rejected, 217–205.

On March 27, 2014, Waters introduced a discussion draft of the Housing Opportunities Move the Economy Forward Act of 2014 known as the Home Forward Act of 2014. A key provision of the bill includes the collection of 10 basis points for "every dollar outstanding mortgages collateralizing covered securities", estimated at $5 billion a year. These funds would be directed to three funds that support affordable housing initiatives, with 75% going to the National Housing trust fund. The National Housing Trust Fund will then provide block grants to states to be used primarily to build, preserve, rehabilitate, and operate rental housing that is affordable to the lowest income households, and groups including seniors, disabled persons and low income workers. The National Housing Trust was enacted in 2008, but has yet to be funded. In 2009, Waters co-sponsored Representative John Conyers' bill calling for reparations for slavery to be paid to black Americans.

For her tenure as chair of the House Financial Services Committee in the 116th Congress, Waters earned an "A" grade from the nonpartisan Lugar Center's Congressional Oversight Hearing Index.

==== CIA ====
After a 1996 San Jose Mercury News article alleged the complicity of the Central Intelligence Agency (CIA) in the Los Angeles crack epidemic of the 1980s, Waters called for an investigation. She asked whether "U.S.-government paid or organized operatives smuggled, transported and sold it to American citizens". The United States Department of Justice announced it had failed to find any evidence to support the original story. The Los Angeles Times also concluded after its own extensive investigation that the allegations were not supported by evidence. The author of the original story, Gary Webb, was eventually transferred to a different beat and removed from investigative reporting, before his death in 2004. After these post-publication investigations, Waters read into the Congressional Record a memorandum of understanding in which former President Ronald Reagan's CIA director rejected any duty by the CIA to report illegal narcotics trafficking to the Department of Justice.

==== Allegations of corruption ====
According to Chuck Neubauer and Ted Rohrlich writing in the Los Angeles Times in 2004, Waters' relatives had made more than $1 million (~$1.63 million in 2025) during the preceding eight years by doing business with companies, candidates and causes that Waters had helped. They claimed she and her husband helped a company get government bond business, and her daughter Karen Waters and son Edward Waters have profited from her connections. Waters replied, "They do their business and I do mine." Liberal watchdog group Citizens for Responsibility and Ethics in Washington named Waters to its list of corrupt members of Congress in its 2005, 2006, 2009 and 2011 reports. Citizens Against Government Waste named her the June 2009 Porker of the Month due to her intention to obtain an earmark for the Maxine Waters Employment Preparation Center.

Waters came under investigation for ethics violations and was accused by a House panel of at least one ethics violation related to her efforts to help OneUnited Bank receive federal aid. Waters' husband is a stockholder and former director of OneUnited Bank and the bank's executives were major contributors to her campaigns. In September 2008, Waters arranged meetings between U.S. Treasury Department officials and OneUnited Bank so that the bank could plead for federal cash. It had been heavily invested in Freddie Mac and Fannie Mae, and its capital was "all but wiped out" after the U.S. government took it over. The bank received $12 million in Troubled Asset Relief Program (TARP) money. The matter was investigated by the House Ethics Committee, which charged Waters with violations of the House's ethics rules in 2010. On September 21, 2012, the House Ethics Committee completed a report clearing Waters of all ethics charges after nearly three years of investigation.

==== Objection to 2000 presidential election results ====
Waters and other House members objected to Florida's electoral votes, which George W. Bush narrowly won after a contentious recount. Because no senator joined her objection, the objection was dismissed by Vice President Al Gore, who was Bush's opponent in the 2000 presidential election.

==== Objection to 2004 presidential election results ====
Waters was one of 31 House Democrats who voted to not count Ohio's electoral votes in the 2004 presidential election. President George W. Bush won Ohio by 118,457 votes.

==== Objection to 2016 presidential election results ====
Waters objected to Wyoming's electoral votes after the 2016 presidential election, a state Donald Trump won with 68.2% of the vote. Because no senator joined her objection, the objection was dismissed by then-Vice President Joe Biden.

==== "Reclaiming my time" ====
In July 2017, during a House Financial Services Committee meeting, Waters questioned United States Secretary of the Treasury Steven Mnuchin. At several points during the questioning, Waters used the phrase "reclaiming my time" when Mnuchin did not directly address the questions Waters had asked him. The video of the interaction between Waters and Mnuchin became popular on social media, and the phrase became attached to her criticisms of Trump.

==== Louis Farrakhan ====
In early 2018, Waters was among the members of Congress the Republican Jewish Coalition called on to resign due to their connections with Nation of Islam leader and known anti-Semite Louis Farrakhan, who had recently drawn criticism for antisemitic remarks. The Pittsburgh Jewish Chronicle noted that Waters had "long embraced Farrakhan" and refused to denounce him, even as other members of the Congressional Black Caucus who secretly met with Farrakhan in 2005 eventually did.

=== Confrontationalism ===
==== Rodney King verdict and Los Angeles riots ====
When south-central Los Angeles erupted in riots – in which 63 were killed – after the Rodney King verdict in 1992, Waters gained national attention when she led a chant of "No justice, no peace" at a rally amidst the riot. She also "helped deliver relief supplies in Watts and demanded the resumption of vital services". Waters described the riots as a rebellion, saying, "If you call it a riot it sounds like it was just a bunch of crazy people who went out and did bad things for no reason. I maintain it was somewhat understandable, if not acceptable." In her view, the violence was "a spontaneous reaction to a lot of injustice." In regard to the looting of Korean-owned stores by local black residents, she said in an interview with KABC radio host Michael Jackson:

There were mothers who took this as an opportunity to take some milk, to take some bread, to take some shoes. Maybe they shouldn't have done it, but the atmosphere was such that they did it. They are not crooks.

==== Sarah Huckabee Sanders ====
On June 23, 2018, after an incident in which White House Press Secretary Sarah Huckabee Sanders was denied service and asked to leave a restaurant, Waters urged attendees at a rally in Los Angeles to harass Trump administration officials, saying:

If you see anybody from [Trump's] cabinet in a restaurant, in a department store, at a gasoline station, you get out and you create a crowd, and you push back on them, and you tell them they're not welcome anymore, anywhere.

Many on the Right saw this statement as an incitement of violence against officials from the Trump administration.

In response, House Democratic leader Nancy Pelosi posted comments on Twitter reported to be a condemnation of Waters' remarks: "Trump's daily lack of civility has provoked responses that are predictable but unacceptable."

==== Derek Chauvin trial ====
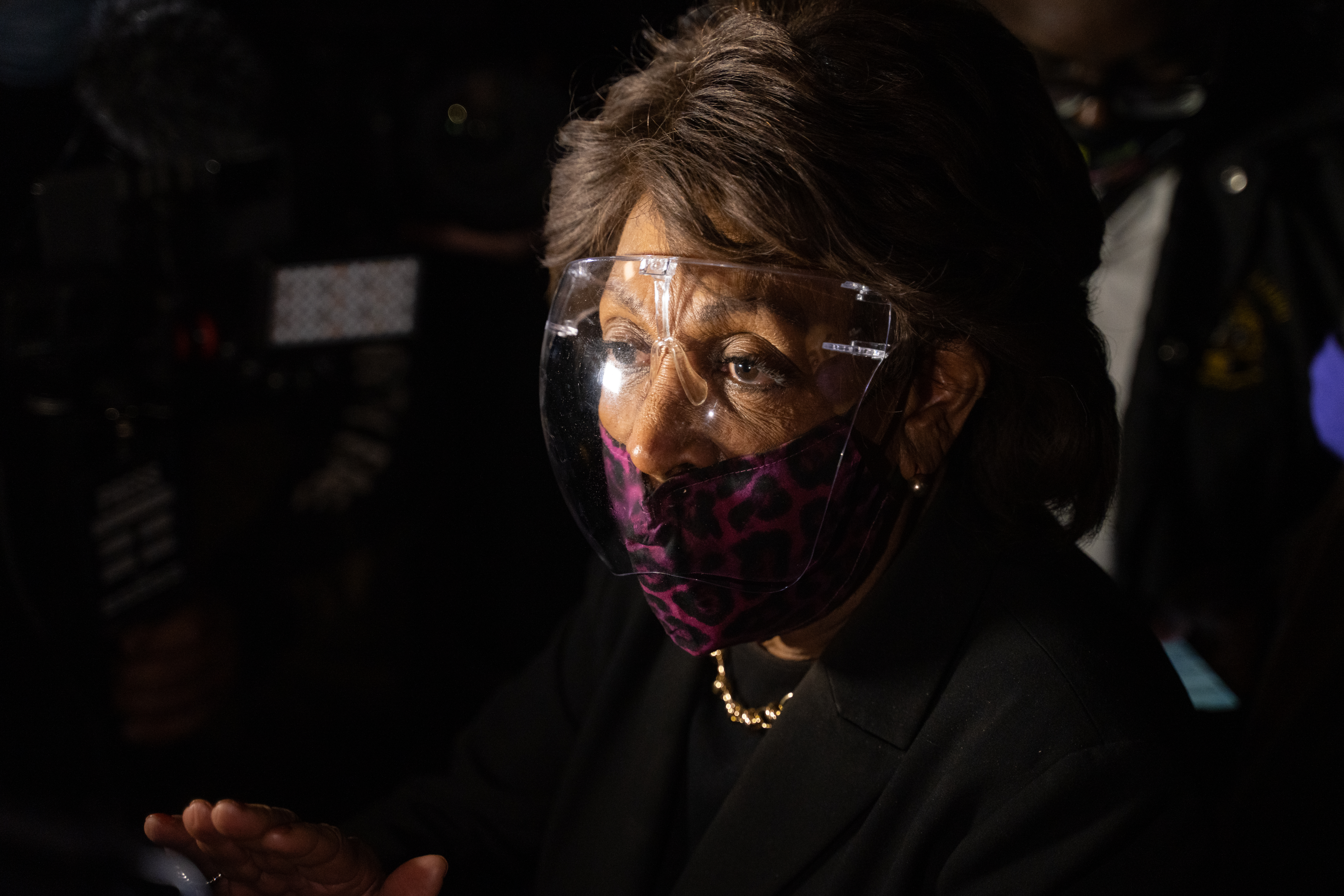
Waters at the Daunte Wright protests in 2021

Comments by Waters on April 17, 2021, while attending protests over the killing of Daunte Wright in Brooklyn Center, Minnesota, drew controversy. Responding to questions outside the Brooklyn Center police department – a heavily fortified area that for days had been the site of violent clashes between law enforcement and demonstrators attempting to overrun it – Waters commented on the protests and the looming jury verdict in the trial of Derek Chauvin, a former Minneapolis police officer who at the time was charged with murdering George Floyd. Before closing arguments in the trial, Waters said, "I hope we get a verdict that says guilty, guilty, guilty. And if we don't, we cannot go away", and when asked, "What happens if we do not get what you just told? What should the people do? What should protesters do?", Waters responded:

We've got to stay on the street. And we've got to get more active, we've got to get more confrontational, we've got to make sure that they know that we mean business.

In response to a question from a reporter about the curfew in effect in Brooklyn Center, which loomed shortly, Waters said, "I don't think anything about curfew ... I don't know what 'curfew' means. Curfew means that 'I want to you all to stop talking, I want you to stop meeting, I want you to stop gathering.' I don't agree with that."

The protests outside the Brooklyn Center police station remained peaceful through the night. The crowd grew raucous when the curfew went into effect but shrank shortly after as protesters left on their own and no arrests were reported.

The judge in Chauvin's trial said on April 19, 2021, that Waters' comments were "abhorrent" and that it was "disrespectful to the rule of law and to the judicial branch" for elected officials to comment in advance of the verdict. The judge refused the defense's request for a mistrial, saying that the jury "have been told not to watch the news. I trust they are following those instructions", but also that "Congresswoman Waters may have given you something on appeal that may result in this whole trial being overturned".

After Waters' comments, Republican minority leader Kevin McCarthy said, "Waters is inciting violence in Minneapolis just as she has incited it in the past. If Speaker Pelosi doesn't act against this dangerous rhetoric, I will bring action this week". On April 19, 2021, McCarthy introduced a resolution in the House to censure Waters, calling her comments "dangerous". The following day, the House voted to block McCarthy's resolution, narrowly defeating it along party lines, 216–210.

Waters later said that her remarks in Brooklyn Center were taken out of context and that she believed in nonviolent actions. In an interview, she said, "I talk about confronting the justice system, confronting the policing that's going on, I'm talking about speaking up. I'm talking about legislation. I'm talking about elected officials doing what needs to be done to control their budgets and to pass legislation."

=== Bombing attempt ===
Packages that contained pipe bombs were sent to two of Waters' offices on October 24, 2018. They were intercepted and investigated by the FBI. No one was injured. Similar packages were sent to several other Democratic leaders and to CNN. In 2019, Cesar Sayoc pleaded guilty to mailing the bombs and was sentenced to 20 years in prison.

=== Committee assignments ===
Waters in 2026

For the 119th Congress:

- Committee on Financial Services (ranking member)
  - As ranking member of the committee, Waters is entitled to sit as an ex officio member in any subcommittee meeting, per the committee rules.

=== Caucus memberships ===
- Chief deputy whip
- Founding member and chair of the Out of Iraq Caucus
- Congressional Progressive Caucus
- Congressional Black Caucus (CBC); past chair of CBC (105th United States Congress)
- Medicare for All Caucus
- Congressional Caucus for the Equal Rights Amendment
- Congressional Equality Caucus
- United States–China Working Group
- Congressional Asian Pacific American Caucus

== Political positions ==
=== Abortion ===
Waters has a 100% rating from NARAL Pro-Choice America and an F rating from the Susan B. Anthony List based on her abortion-related voting record. She opposed the overturning of Roe v. Wade.

=== Barack Obama ===
In August 2011, Waters criticized President Barack Obama, saying he was insufficiently supportive of the black community. She referred to African Americans' high unemployment rate (around 15.9% at the time). At a Congressional Black Caucus town-hall meeting on jobs in Detroit, Waters said that African American members of Congress were reluctant to criticize or place public pressure on Obama because "y'all love the President".

In October 2011, Waters had a public dispute with Obama, arguing that he paid more attention to swing voters in the Iowa caucuses than to equal numbers of (geographically dispersed) black voters. In response, Obama said that it was time to "stop complaining, stop grumbling, stop crying" and get back to working with him.

=== Crime ===
Waters opposes mandatory minimum sentences.

=== Donald Trump ===
Waters has called Trump "a bully, an egotistical maniac, a liar and someone who did not need to be president" and "the most deplorable person I've ever met in my life".In a 2017 appearance on MSNBC's All In with Chris Hayes, she said Trump's advisors who have ties to Russia or have oil and gas interests there are "a bunch of scumbags".

Waters began to call for the impeachment of Trump shortly after he took office. In February 2017, she said that Trump was "leading himself" to possible impeachment because of his conflicts of interest and that he was creating "chaos and division". In September 2017, while giving a eulogy at Dick Gregory's funeral, she said that she was "cleaning out the White House" and that "when I get through with Donald Trump, he's going to wish he had been impeached." In October 2017, she said the U.S. Congress had enough evidence against Trump to "be moving on impeachment", in reference to Russian collusion allegations during the 2016 presidential election, and that Trump "has openly obstructed justice in front of our face".

Linking Trump to the violence that erupted at a white nationalist protest rally in Charlottesville, Virginia, on August 12, 2017, Waters said that the White House "is now the White Supremacists' House". After Trump's 2018 State of the Union address, she released a video response addressing what most members of the Congressional Black Caucus viewed as his racist viewpoint and actions, saying, "He claims that he's bringing people together but make no mistake, he is a dangerous, unprincipled, divisive, and shameful racist." Trump later replied by calling her a "low-IQ individual".

On April 24, 2018, while attending the Time 100 Gala, Waters urged Trump to resign from office, "So that I won't have to keep up this fight of your having to be impeached because I don't think you deserve to be there. Just get out."

On December 18, 2019, Waters voted for both articles of impeachment against Trump. Moments before voting for the second impeachment of Donald Trump, she called him "the worst president in the history of the United States.″

=== Economy ===
==== Cryptocurrency ====
On June 18, 2019, Waters asked Facebook to halt its plan for the development and launching of Libra, a new cryptocurrency, citing a list of recent scandals. She said: "The cryptocurrency market currently lacks a clear regulatory framework to provide strong protections for investors, consumers and the economy. Regulators should see this as a wake-up call to get serious about the privacy and national security concerns, cybersecurity risks, and trading risks that are posed by cryptocurrencies".

=== Foreign affairs ===
In August 2008, Waters introduced HR 6796, the Stop Very Unscrupulous Loan Transfers from Underprivileged countries from Rich Exploitive Funds Act (Stop VULTURE Funds Act). It would limit the ability of investors in sovereign debt to use U.S. courts to enforce those instruments against a defaulting country. The bill died in committee.

==== Cuba ====
Waters has visited Cuba a number of times, praising some of Fidel Castro's policy proposals. She also criticized previous U.S. efforts to overthrow the Castro regime and demanded an end to the U.S. trade embargo. In 1998, Waters wrote Castro a letter calling the 1960s and 1970s "a sad and shameful chapter of our history" and thanking him for helping those who needed to "flee political persecution".

In 1998, Waters wrote Castro an open letter asking him not to extradite convicted terrorist Assata Shakur from Cuba, where she had sought asylum. Waters argued that much of the Black community regarded her conviction as false. She had earlier supported a Republican bill to extradite Shakur, who was referred to by her former name, Joanne Chesimard. In 1999, Waters called on President Bill Clinton to return six-year-old Elián González to his father in Cuba; the boy had survived a boat journey from Cuba, during which his mother had drowned, and was taken in by U.S. relatives.

==== Haiti ====
Waters opposed the 2004 coup d'état in Haiti and criticized U.S. involvement. After the coup, she, TransAfrica Forum founder Randall Robinson, and Jamaican member of parliament Sharon Hay-Webster led a delegation to meet with Haitian President Jean-Bertrand Aristide and bring him to Jamaica, where he remained until May.

==== Nagorno-Karabakh conflict ====
On October 1, 2020, Waters co-signed a letter to Secretary of State Mike Pompeo that condemned Azerbaijan's offensive operations against the Armenian-populated enclave Nagorno-Karabakh, denounced Turkey's role in the Nagorno-Karabakh conflict, and called for an immediate ceasefire.

=== George H. W. Bush ===
In July 1992, Waters called President George H. W. Bush "a racist" who "polarized the races in this country". Previously, she had suggested that Bush had used race to advance his policies.

=== Tea Party movement ===
Waters has been very critical of the Tea Party movement. On August 20, 2011, at a town hall discussing some of the displeasure that Obama's supporters felt about the Congressional Black Caucus not supporting him, Waters said, "This is a tough game. You can't be intimidated. You can't be frightened. And as far as I'm concerned, the 'tea party' can go straight to Hell ... and I intend to help them get there."

=== War ===
==== Iraq War ====
Waters voted against the Iraq War Resolution, the 2002 resolution that funded and granted Congressional approval to possible military action against the regime of Saddam Hussein. She has remained a consistent critic of the subsequent war and has supported immediate troop withdrawal from Iraq. Waters asserted in 2007 that President George W. Bush was trying to "set [Congress] up" by continually requesting funds for an "occupation" that was "draining" the country of capital, soldiers' lives, and other resources. In particular, she argued that the economic resources being "wasted" in Iraq were those that might provide universal health care or fully fund Bush's "No Child Left Behind" education bill. Additionally, Waters, representing a congressional district whose median income falls far below the national average, argued that patriotism alone had not been the sole driving force for those U.S. service personnel serving in Iraq. Rather, "many of them needed jobs, they needed resources, they needed money, so they're there". In a subsequent floor speech, she said that Congress, lacking the votes to override the "inevitable Bush veto on any Iraq-related legislation," needed to "better [challenge] the administration's false rhetoric about the Iraq war" and "educate our constituents [about] the connection between the problems in Pakistan, Turkey, and Iran with the problems we have created in Iraq". A few months before these speeches, Waters cosponsored the House resolution to impeach Vice President Dick Cheney for making allegedly "false statements" about the war.

== Personal life ==
Waters is married to Sid Williams, who is her second husband. Williams is a former United States ambassador to the Bahamas during the Clinton administration and retired professional American football player for the National Football League. They live in the Windsor Square neighborhood of Los Angeles.

During the COVID-19 pandemic in May 2020, Waters confirmed her sister, Velma Moody, had died of the virus at the age of 86.

=== Other achievements ===
- Maxine Waters Preparation Center in Watts, California – named after her while she was a member of the California Assembly
- Co-founder of Black Women's Forum
- Co-founder of Community Build
- Bruce F. Vento Award from the National Homelessness Law Center for her work on behalf of homeless persons.
- Candace Award, National Coalition of 100 Black Women, 1992
- 2025 PFLAG National Champion of Justice award

== See also ==
- List of African-American United States representatives
- Women in the United States House of Representatives

U.S. House of Representatives
Preceded by Augustus Hawkins	Member of the U.S. House of Representatives from California's 29th congressional district 1991–1993	Succeeded by Henry Waxman
Preceded by Jerry Lewis	Member of the U.S. House of Representatives from California's 35th congressional district 1993–2013	Succeeded by Gloria Negrete McLeod
Preceded by Donald Payne	Chair of the Congressional Black Caucus; 1997–1999	Succeeded by Jim Clyburn
Preceded by Barney Frank	Ranking Member of the House Financial Services Committee; 2013–2019	Succeeded by Patrick McHenry
Preceded by Joe Baca	Member of the U.S. House of Representatives from California's 43rd congressional district 2013–present	Incumbent
Preceded by Jeb Hensarling	Chair of the House Financial Services Committee; 2019–2023	Succeeded by Patrick McHenry
Preceded by Patrick McHenry	Ranking Member of the House Financial Services Committee; 2023–present	Incumbent
U.S. order of precedence (ceremonial)
Preceded by Rosa DeLauro	United States representatives by seniority 9th	Succeeded by Jerry Nadler
Preceded by Rosa DeLauro	Order of precedence of the United States	Succeeded by Jerry Nadler
