= List of ambassadors of the Bahamas to the United States =

Coordinates: 38°54′41.6″N 77°02′59.35″W

Ambassador of The Bahamas to United States Embassy of the Bahamas in Washington, D.C.
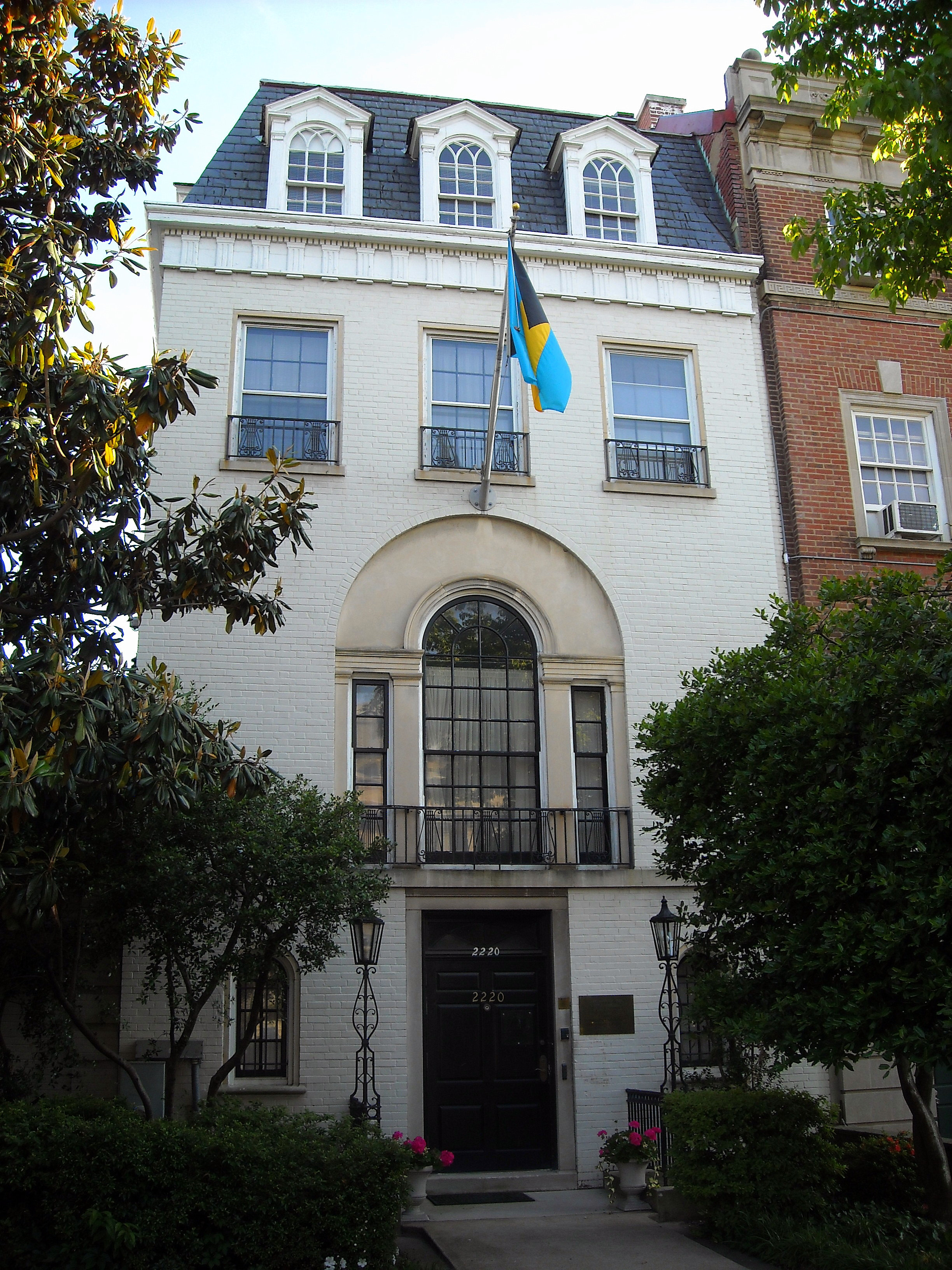
- Incumbent; Sidney S. Collie since 2017
- Inaugural holder: Livingston Basil Johnson
- Formation: November 9, 1973

The Bahamian ambassador in Washington, D. C. is the official representative of the Government in Nassau, Bahamas to the Government of the United States.

== List of representatives ==
Diplomatic agrément	Diplomatic accreditation	Ambassador	Observations	Prime Minister of the Bahamas	List of presidents of the United States	Term end
October 5, 1973	November 9, 1973	Livingston Basil Johnson	(* June 20, 1933 2009),	Lynden O. Pindling	Richard Nixon	
July 29, 1979		Patricia Elaine Joan Rodgers	Chargé d'affaires (* July 13, 1948) Diplomat Education: Master of Arts English, University of Aberdeen, 1970, Diploma in International Relations from the University of the West Indies St Augustine, Trinidad, 1972, PhD	Lynden O. Pindling	Jimmy Carter	
March 6, 1980	April 24, 1980	Reginald Lightbourn Wood		Lynden O. Pindling	Jimmy Carter	
July 24, 1986	September 15, 1986	Margaret Evangeline McDonald		Lynden O. Pindling	Ronald Reagan	
November 13, 1992	November 19, 1992	Timothy Donaldson		Hubert Ingraham	George H. W. Bush	
July 15, 1996	July 29, 1997	Arlington Griffith Butler		Hubert Ingraham	Bill Clinton	
May 9, 2000	June 14, 2000	Joshua Sears		Hubert Ingraham	Bill Clinton	
November 21, 2007	January 22, 2008	Cornelius A. Smith		Hubert Ingraham	George W. Bush	
November 19, 2013	December 3, 2013	Eugene Glenwood Newry		Perry Christie	Barack Obama	
October, 2017	November 29, 2017	H.E. Sidney Collie		Hubert Minnis	Donald Trump	
February 18, 2022	March 7, 2022	Wendell K. Jones		Philip Davis	Joe Biden	
