= J. Richard Blankenship =

American diplomat

Richard Blankenship
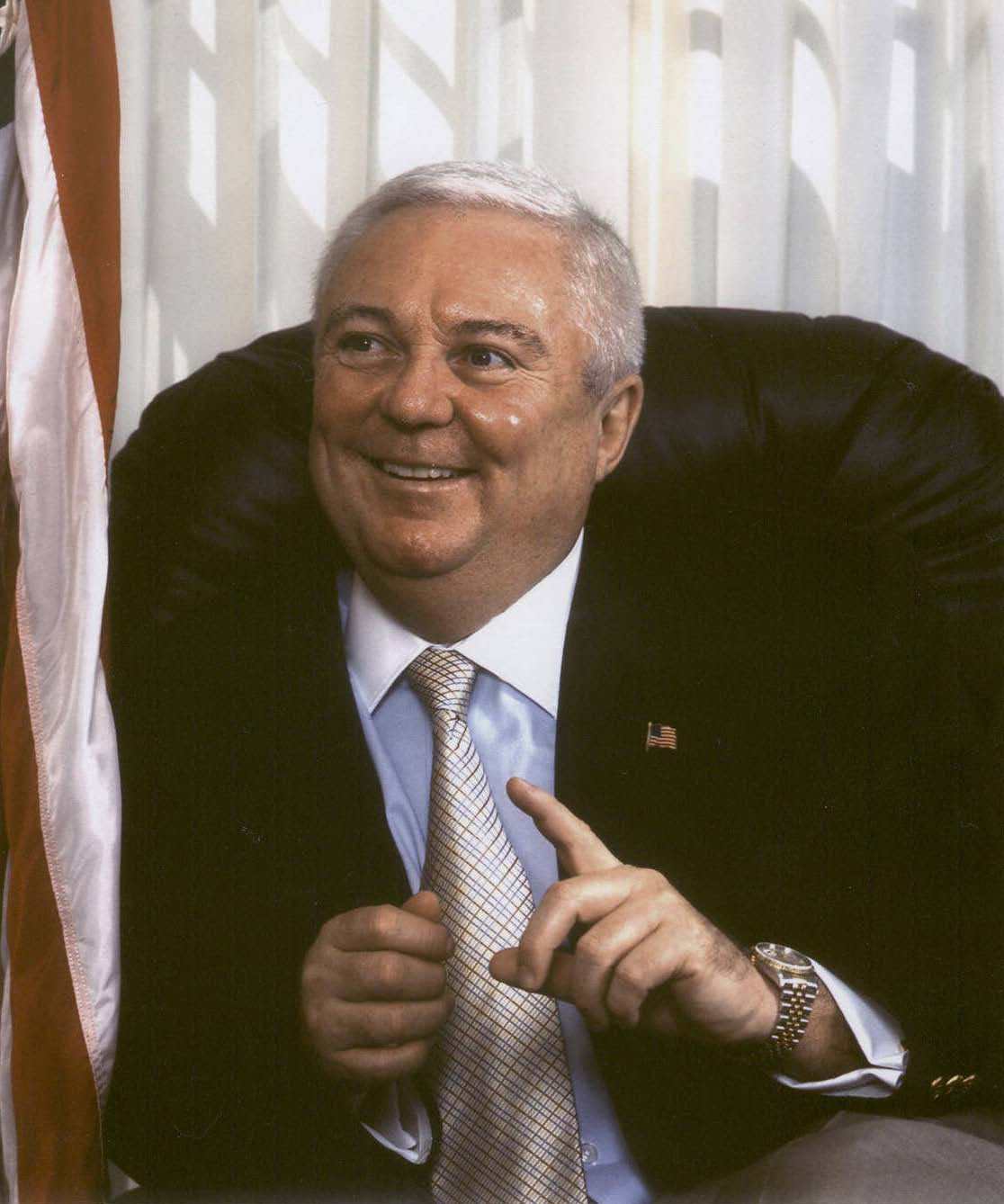
- Ambassador Blankenship

United States Ambassador to the Bahamas
- In office December 3, 2001 – July 18, 2003
- President: George W. Bush
- Preceded by: Arthur Louis Schechter
- Succeeded by: John D. Rood

Personal details
- Born: 1949 (age 76–77) Troy, Alabama, U.S.
- Party: Republican
- Profession: Diplomat

James Richard Blankenship (born 1949) is an American former politician who served as United States Ambassador to the Bahamas from 2001 to 2003; he was nominated by President George W. Bush in the spring of 2001.

== Early life and education ==
Blakenship was born in 1949 in Troy, Alabama and is a graduate of Florida State University and Harvard Kennedy School.

== Career ==
Before becoming ambassador to the Bahamas, Richard Blankenship was a partner in the Capital Policy Group, an investment banking firm with a home office in Jacksonville, Florida. He also served as president and CFO of St. John's Capital, a regional firm with offices in the U.S. Southeast.

While serving in the Bahamas, Blankenship became best known for his emphasis on drug interdiction. Under his leadership, record amounts of cocaine were seized and more drug smugglers extradited to the United States than in the entire relationship between the Bahamas and United States. Notable in his efforts was the added use of electronic intelligence gathering and small guerrilla actions against the cartels, which the U.S. Coast Guard in joint efforts with the DEA had been practicing for some time ineffectively.

Blankenship could often be found in the producing countries of South America coordinating operations, in the jungles or on isolated islands with law enforcement authorities. He was referred to as the "no nonsense diplomat" by The Nassau Tribune after exposing a ten-year cover-up of a Royal Bahamas Defence Force theft of cocaine used in an undercover operation. Some Mexican Government officials believe the smuggling routes through Mexico were established because of the increased emphasis Blankenship brought to interdiction efforts in the Caribbean. Blankenship announced his resignation in June 2003, following many complaints of Bahamians.

He is currently active as Director of Global Policy Advisers, an international business consulting group. It is thought Global Policy Advisers is involved with interdiction efforts of governments in the Caribbean and South America. According to Mexican police authorities, Global Policy Advisers has clients in Mexico and is conducting intelligence gathering. Blankenship, located in Mexico City, would neither confirm nor deny any information about Global Policy Advisers' clients. Blankenship is also listed as the managing director of The Policy Advisers, a partnership providing foreign policy advice to U.S. clients. Recently he became chairman of the board of Bio-Renewable Fuels Inc, a company whose mission it is to grow renewable biomass fuels (eucalyptus trees) for use by electrical producers both in the United States and abroad.

Blankenship writes a syndicated column for newspapers in the Caribbean and his writings on reorganization of government can frequently be found on conservative web sites.

Diplomatic posts
Preceded by Arthur Louis Schechter	United States Ambassador to Bahamas; 2001 – 2003	Succeeded by Robert M. Witajewski
