= Stephanie Bowers =

American diplomat

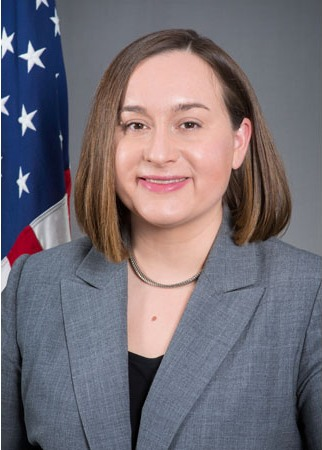

United States Chargé d'affaires to The Bahamas
- In office March 1, 2018 – December 31, 2020
- President: Donald Trump
- Preceded by: Lisa A. Johnson
- Succeeded by: Usha E. Pitts

Stephanie Lynne Bowers is a Senior Foreign Service Officer who served as the Charge d’Affaires at the United States Embassy in The Bahamas from 2018 to 2020. She replaced Lisa A. Johnson.

== Career ==
Before her appointment in The Bahamas, Bowers was Chief of Staff of the Department of State’s Bureau of Western Hemisphere Affairs. Bowers also worked as Deputy Director of the Office of Central American Affairs, Deputy Director of the Office of International Religious Freedom, Senior Watch Officer in the Secretary of State’s Executive Secretariat Operations Center, and as Caribbean Basin Security Initiative Coordinator and South America Team Leader in the Bureau of International Narcotics and Law Enforcement Affairs (INL). Bowers also worked at the White House as Director for Andean Affairs at the National Security Council.

Bowers' overseas assignments included Antananarivo, Madagascar; Madrid, Spain; Durban, South Africa; and Baghdad, Iraq where she was the Transition Director for INL, in charge of transitioning U.S. military-led activities to Department of State control.

Bowers graduated from The George Washington University with B.A. degrees in International Affairs and French Language and Literature and the National War College, where she was named a Distinguished Graduate and received an M.S. in National Security Strategy. She was also previously a Fellow for MIT's Seminar XXI on Foreign Politics, International Relations, and the National Interest.

On September 2, 2019, Bowers issued a disaster declaration for The Bahamas due to Hurricane Dorian, enabling U.S. relief efforts. She led the U.S. Mission's whole of government response, the largest U.S. assistance package ever launched to support The Bahamas. The U.S. Mission's search and rescue efforts in the immediate aftermath of the storm saved over 400 lives, and the immediate humanitarian relief effort distributed over $34 million in humanitarian aid to Dorian victims.
