= Bsous Silk Museum =

Sheer fabrics museum in Lebanon

- متحف الحرير
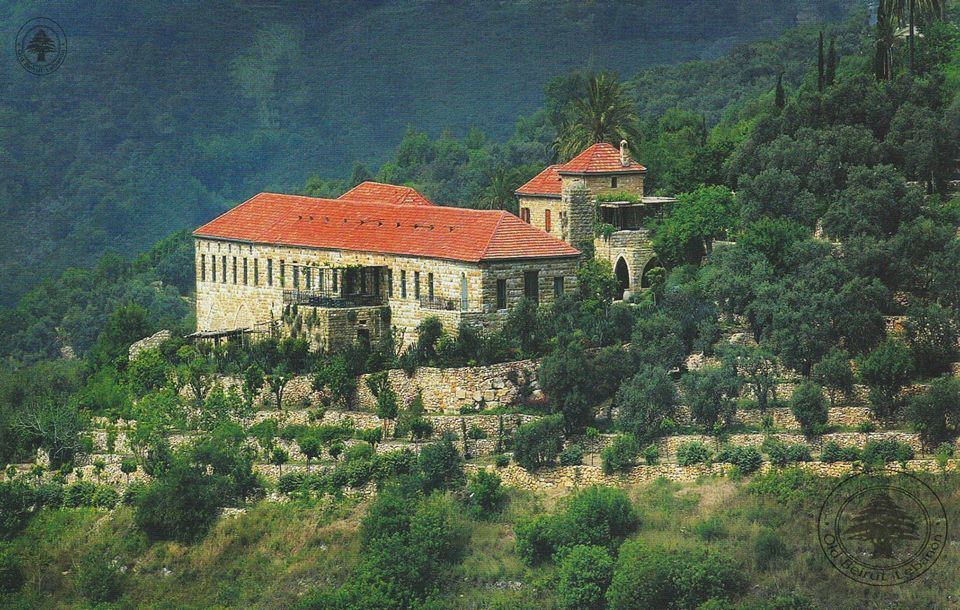
- The Silk Museum, in 1960
- Location: Bsous, Aley; Lebanon
- Coordinates: 33.8168°N 35.5721°E
- Type: Silk
- Presidents: George and Alexandra Asseily
- Website: Official site

Bsous Silk Museum (Arabic: متحف الحرير بسوس) is a silk museum in the town of Bsous near Wadi Chahrour in Lebanon, located around 15 kilometres east of Beirut.

== History ==
The structure was originally built by the Fayad family, and operated as a silk factory between 1901 and 1954. In 1990, for a short time, the factory and the grounds were occupied by the Syrian army. It was restored by its owners, George and Alexandra Asseily, with the help of Jean-Louis Mange, to serve as a museum. The museum opened in 2000 and highlights the 1,500-year-old history of silk production in Lebanon, which ended when the last silk mill closed in the 1970s.

Thierry Huau and Francoise Le Noble Predine from Paris, played a major role in the redevelopment of the gardens to the building. Le Noble brought wild silk from Madagascar and together with Mona Sader Issa helped to establish aMED, the Association of Memory and Development. Students of the Lycée Agricole et Horticole of Saint Germain en Laye in France and the Association have been responsible for many ecological projects in the village of Bsous and the pine forests around Beirut. Architect Jacques Abou Khaled, under the management of Sami Feghali were responsible for the redesign of the building into a museum.

== Exhibitions ==
Part of the Silk Museum's permanent collection includes live silkworms. Exhibits demonstrate the process of "hatching" the silkworm, leading to the production of silk thread and weaving through all the various stages. Also on display are domestically made finished silk products, such as traditional Lebanese evening dresses and silk trousers that were worn by princesses in the nineteenth century. There is also a wing dedicated to eastern silk and gold, and a wing holding the treasures of the Bags Antaki family of Aleppo, dated to the nineteenth century and early twentieth century. Visitors on a tour of the museum can also see images of farmers working in the production of silk and silkworm picking and collecting.

The museum regularly puts on temporary exhibitions. For instance, in the past, it has put on displays for around 6 months, typically from May to October, displaying artisanal silks and weavings from Cambodia, Laos and Vietnam, and private silk collections from along the Silk Road, including China, Japan and the Middle East.
