= List of ambassadors of the United States to the Bahamas =

Ambassador of the United States to the Bahamas
- Seal of the United States Department of State

- Flag of a United States ambassador

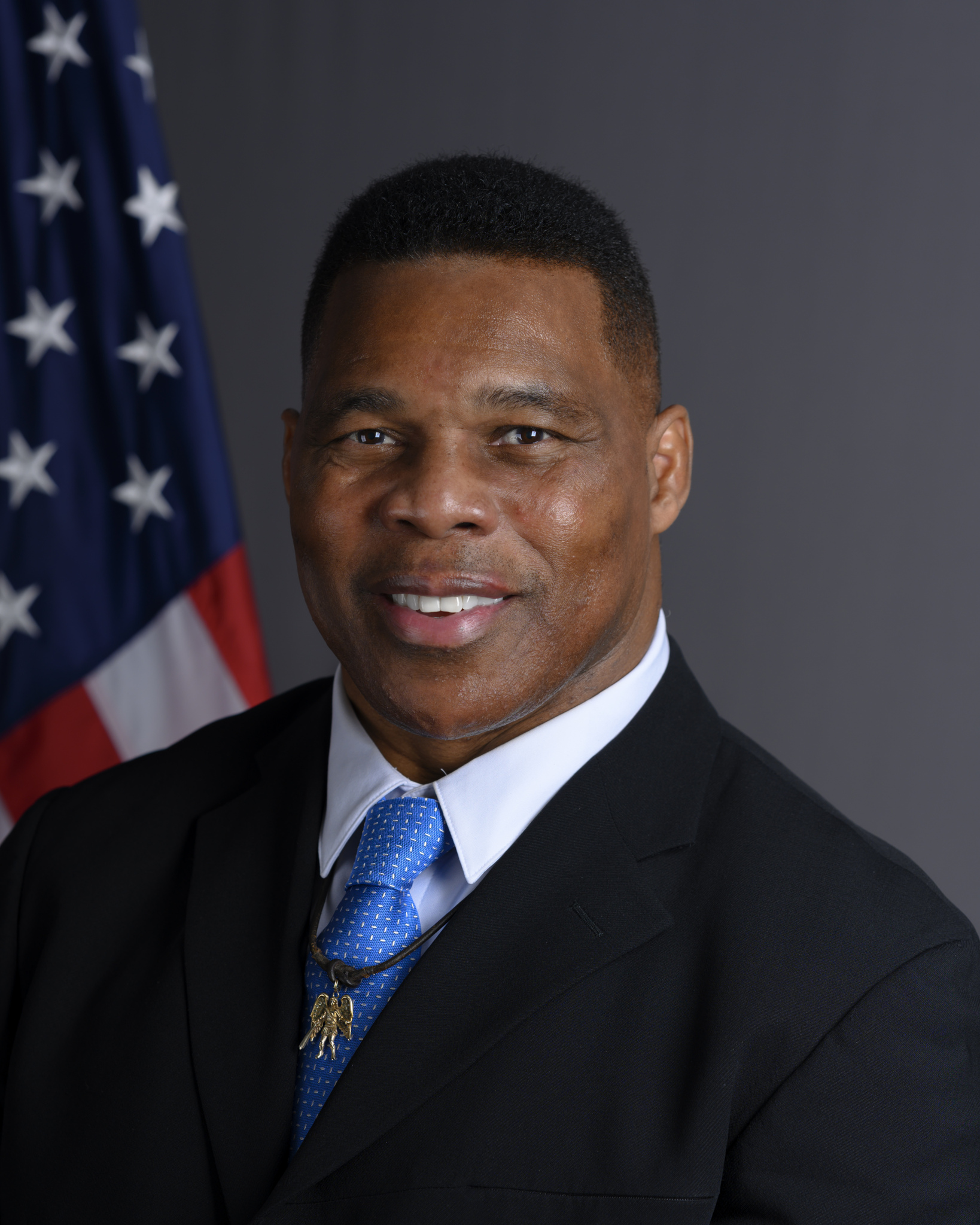
- Incumbent; Herschel Walker since December 9, 2025
- Nominator: The president of the United States
- Appointer: The president; with Senate advice and consent
- Inaugural holder: Moncrieff J. Spear as Chargé d'Affaires ad interim
- Formation: July 10, 1973
- Website: U.S. Embassy – Nassau

The ambassador extraordinary and plenipotentiary of the United States of America to the Bahamas, usually simply called U.S. ambassador to the Bahamas, is an official position and title appointed by the president of the United States and confirmed by the United States Senate by majority vote. The ambassador oversees diplomatic relations and foreign policy between the United States and the Bahamas. The ambassador lives in Nassau, the nation's capital.

Due to political disputes, the United States Senate had not confirmed an ambassador to the Bahamas since November 2011, with the post either remaining vacant or held by interim appointees who are not ambassadors. Cassandra Butts, nominated for the post by President Barack Obama in 2013, died of leukemia in 2016, having spent more than two years awaiting a vote on her appointment. President Donald Trump nominated Doug Manchester in 2017 but the nomination stalled and he eventually withdrew. In May 2020, President Trump nominated William A. Douglass for the position; his nomination was eventually withdrawn by President Joe Biden in February 2021. In May 2022, President Biden nominated Calvin Smyre for the position. As of December 2024, Smyre's nomination remained pending before the Senate Foreign Relations Committee. On December 18, 2024, President-elect Donald Trump announced that he had nominated Herschel Walker to serve in the role. He was confirmed in the senate on October 7, 2025, becoming the first confirmed ambassador to the Bahamas since 2011.

== List of U.S. ambassadors to the Bahamas ==
The following is a list of United States ambassadors, or other chiefs of mission, to The Bahamas. The title given by the United States State Department to this position is currently Ambassador Extraordinary and Plenipotentiary.

Representative	Title	Presentation of credentials	Termination of mission	President
Moncrieff J. Spear	Chargé d'Affaires ad interim	July 10, 1973	September 7, 1973	Richard Nixon
Ronald I. Spiers	Ambassador Extraordinary and Plenipotentiary	September 7, 1973	September 2, 1974	Richard Nixon
Seymour Weiss	Ambassador Extraordinary and Plenipotentiary	September 11, 1974	December 15, 1976	Gerald Ford
Jack B. Olson	Ambassador Extraordinary and Plenipotentiary	December 22, 1976	April 30, 1977	Gerald Ford
William Bernstein Schwartz Jr.	Ambassador Extraordinary and Plenipotentiary	October 11, 1977	January 31, 1981	Jimmy Carter
Lev E. Dobriansky	Ambassador Extraordinary and Plenipotentiary	March 15, 1983	August 30, 1986	Ronald Reagan
Carol Boyd Hallett	Ambassador Extraordinary and Plenipotentiary	November 17, 1986	May 10, 1989	Ronald Reagan
Mayer Jacob Hecht	Ambassador Extraordinary and Plenipotentiary	August 23, 1989	March 1, 1993	George H. W. Bush
Lino Gutierrez	Chargé d'Affairs ad interim	March 1, 1993	July 1993	Bill Clinton
John S. Ford	Chargé d'Affairs ad interim	July 1993	March 27, 1994	Bill Clinton
Sidney Williams	Ambassador Extraordinary and Plenipotentiary	March 27, 1994	January 11, 1998	Bill Clinton
Arthur Louis Schechter	Ambassador Extraordinary and Plenipotentiary	October 29, 1998	March 1, 2001	Bill Clinton
Arthur Louis Schechter	Ambassador Extraordinary and Plenipotentiary	October 29, 1998	March 1, 2001	George W. Bush
Daniel A. Clune	Charge d'Affaires ad interim	March 1, 2001	December 3, 2001	George W. Bush
J. Richard Blankenship	Ambassador Extraordinary and Plenipotentiary	December 3, 2001	July 18, 2003	George W. Bush
Robert M. Witajewski	Chargé d'Affairs ad interim	July 18, 2003	September 1, 2004	George W. Bush
John D. Rood	Ambassador Extraordinary and Plenipotentiary	September 1, 2004	April 10, 2007	George W. Bush
D. Brent Hardt	Chargé d'Affaires ad interim	April 10, 2007	October 25, 2007	George W. Bush
Ned Siegel	Ambassador Extraordinary and Plenipotentiary	October 26, 2007	January 20, 2009	George W. Bush
Timothy Zúñiga-Brown	Chargé d'Affaires ad interim	January 20, 2009	September 9, 2009	Barack Obama
Nicole Avant	Ambassador Extraordinary and Plenipotentiary	October 22, 2009	November 21, 2011	Barack Obama
John W. Dinkelman	Chargé d'Affaires ad interim	November 21, 2011	July 9, 2014	Barack Obama
Lisa A. Johnson	Chargé d'Affaires ad interim	July 9, 2014	November 9, 2017	Barack Obama
Lisa A. Johnson	Chargé d'Affaires ad interim	July 9, 2014	November 9, 2017	Donald Trump
James Herren	Chargé d'Affaires ad interim	November 9, 2017	March 1, 2018	Donald Trump
Stephanie Bowers	Chargé d'Affaires ad interim	March 1, 2018	December 31, 2020	Donald Trump
Usha E. Pitts	Chargé d'Affaires ad interim	January 1, 2021	April 19, 2024	Joe Biden
Jason Crosby	Chargé d'Affaires ad interim	April 19, 2024	May 29, 2024	Joe Biden
Michael P. Taylor	Chargé d'Affaires ad interim	May 30, 2024	June 24, 2024	Joe Biden
Kimberly Furnish	Chargé d'Affaires ad interim	June 24, 2024	December 4, 2025	Joe Biden
Kimberly Furnish	Chargé d'Affaires ad interim	June 24, 2024	December 4, 2025	Donald Trump
Herschel Walker	Ambassador Extraordinary and Plenipotentiary	December 9, 2025	present	Donald Trump

== See also ==
- The Bahamas–United States relations
- Foreign relations of the Bahamas
- Ambassadors of the United States
