= Nicole Avant =

American music industry executive and United States ambassador

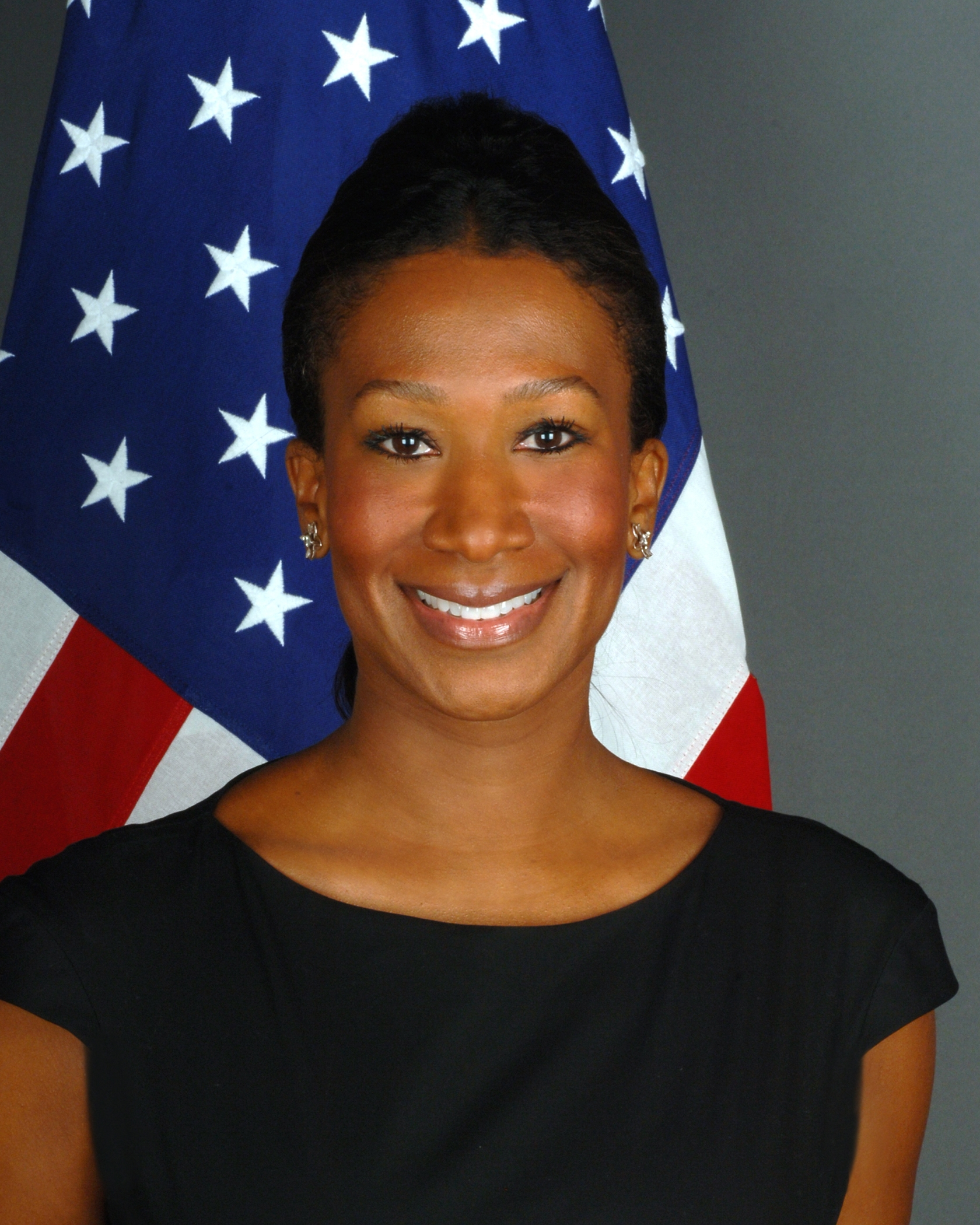

United States Ambassador to The Bahamas
- In office October 22, 2009 – November 21, 2011
- President: Barack Obama
- Preceded by: Ned Siegel
- Succeeded by: Herschel Walker (2025)

Personal details
- Born: March 6, 1968 (age 58) Los Angeles County, California, U.S.
- Party: Democratic
- Spouse: Ted Sarandos (m. 2009)
- Relatives: Clarence Avant (father)
- Education: California State University, Northridge (BA)

Nicole A. Avant (born March 6, 1968) is an American diplomat, producer, and political activist who served as the United States ambassador to the Bahamas from 2009 to 2011. She is a member of the Democratic Party.

== Early career ==
Nicole Avant is the daughter of Clarence and Jacqueline Avant. Her father, known as "The Black Godfather", was chairman of Motown Records. Nicole was born on her mother's 28th birthday. During her childhood, Jimmy Carter, Tom Bradley, Gray Davis, and Jerry Brown were frequent visitors to the family's estate in Hollywood.

Nicole Avant graduated in 1986 from Beverly Hills High School and in 1990 from California State University, Northridge with a B.A. in communications. She started her career working for the promotion division of A&M Records in Los Angeles. In 1988, she was named vice president of Interior Music Publishing, her father's music company.

In 2006, Avant helped launch the Culture Cabinet, and organized fundraising events for Harold Ford Jr. in Tennessee before becoming the Southern California finance co-chairwoman for the Barack Obama 2008 presidential campaign (along with Charles Rivkin), while her father was fundraising for Hillary Clinton.

== U.S. ambassador to the Bahamas (2009–2011) ==
Avant was appointed United States Ambassador to the Bahamas by President Barack Obama on June 16, 2009. She was sworn in on October 22, 2009, and served until November 21, 2011. At 41, she was the first Black woman and the youngest US Ambassador to the Bahamas ever. During her term, Avant was nominated for the State Department's Sue M. Cobb Award for exemplary diplomatic service.

During her tenure in the Bahamas, Avant worked with local advocacy groups for people with disabilities. She hosted Eunice and Francesca Shriver to raise awareness for Special Olympics-Bahamas. She also brought Magic Johnson to the Bahamas Chamber of Commerce to advise on trade with the United States.

A State Department inspector general's report on the U.S. Embassy in the Bahamas praised the Ambassador and the embassy noting that the "large and diverse law enforcement community in Mission Bahamas works well together, under the Ambassador’s leadership, to counter threats to U.S. national security." The report also noted that the Ambassador and the new deputy chief of mission, whom she had hired, were "emerging strongly from a period of dysfunctional leadership and management."

The inspector general reported Avant was frequently away from the embassy often traveling to and from her home in Los Angeles. When she was in the Bahamas, she often worked from her office at the residence rather than working at the embassy. Avant "was absent from [her] post for 276 days during a 670-day period from November 19, 2009, to September 19, 2011—an average of 12 days per month. The 276 days include ... 102 personal leave days. [She] also traveled to the United States for 77 work days on what she identified as business, with 23 days on what appear to have been official travel orders." The report found she "had not had frequent policy-level interaction with the [State] Department or other Washington agencies ... She relied unduly on her [deputy chief of mission] to attend to day-to-day contacts with the [State] Department."

The inspector general report offered praise for the service levels from the consular section, noted an "invigorated" public affairs section and reported that "she (Avant) and her staff have improved the embassy’s reputation among Bahamians. This, in turn, has fostered a close bilateral environment that is conducive to excellent law enforcement cooperation."

In response, Avant said that she had inherited a dysfunctional embassy, and the new executive team she appointed had improved things.

Avant resigned in November 2011 and informally worked on Barack Obama's 2012 re-election efforts, including fundraising.

== Post-politics activities ==
In 2019, Avant produced the documentary The Black Godfather, centering on her father Clarence. Her husband, Ted Sarandos, is the co-chief executive officer of Netflix, who distributed the film.

In January 2021, Avant was an early investor in Thirteen Lune, an e-commerce site focused on makeup, skincare, haircare and wellness products owned by people of color and ally brands.

On April 28, 2023, The Jacqueline Avant Children and Family Center was opened in memory of her philanthropist mother who was fatally shot during a home invasion in 2021. The center will serve the needs of at-risk children. On October 17, 2023, Avant released her memoir, “Think You’ll Be Happy: Moving Through Grief With Grit, Grace, and Gratitude.”

== Accolades ==
- 2012 : 20th Annual Trumpet Awards's International Award

== Personal life ==
Avant is married to Ted Sarandos, the co-CEO of Netflix. In 2010, the couple purchased a Hollywood residence for $5.4 million from Max Azria, and sold it in 2017 for $8.825 million. In 2010, the couple also purchased a beachfront house in Malibu from David Spade for $10.2 million.
