= Timothy Donaldson =

Bahamian politician and diplomat

Timothy B. Donaldson, CBE
- Born: January 2, 1934
- Died: February 26, 2013 (aged 79)
- Education: Fisk University; University of Minnesota; Columbia University
- Occupations: Politician, banker, economist, diplomat
- Spouse: Yolande Yasmin Parchment-Donaldson (1990 - 2013) Donna Penn Townes (div.)
- Children: David (59), Kevin (54), and Tatiana (25)

Timothy Baswell Donaldson CBE (January 2, 1934 – February 26, 2013) was a Bahamian politician, banker, economist, and diplomat.

== Early life ==
Donaldson was born on January 2, 1934. He earned a Bachelor of Arts from Fisk University, a master's degree in mathematics from the University of Minnesota, and a master's degree in public administration from Columbia University. He also held a Diploma in Public Finance from the International Monetary Fund (IMF). Donaldson received fellowships from the Fellow of the London Institute of Bankers, The Bahamas Institute of Bankers, and the Caribbean Institute of Financial Services.

== Career ==
In 1962, Donaldson launched his career as the Assistant Secretary at the Ministry of Finance, while the Bahamas was still a British colonial possession. In 1972 he served as an economic adviser to the Bahamian government during the Independence Conference held in London. The Bahamas was granted independence on July 10, 1973.

Donaldson became the first, founding Governor of the Central Bank of The Bahamas upon its establishment in 1974. He remained the Governor of the Central Bank of The Bahamas until 1980.

Donaldson was appointed as both the Bahamian Ambassador to the United States and the Permanent Representative to the Organization of American States (OAS) in Washington D.C. in 1992. He simultaneously served as non-resident Ambassador of the Bahamas to Colombia and Mexico as well.

He later served as the chairman of the Securities Commission of the Bahamas. In 2007, Donaldson became the Chairman of The College Council, a governing body which is responsible for the academic policies and administration of the College of the Bahamas.

Former Prime Minister of the Bahamas Hubert Ingraham appointed Donaldson as the co-chairman of the Privatization Committee. Under Donaldson, the Privatization Committee negotiated and approved the sale of the majority of the Bahamas Telecommunications Company to the private sector in 2011.

Donaldson was named a Commander of the Most Excellent Order of the British Empire (CBE) by Queen Elizabeth II in 1973 for his contributions to public service. The Bahamas Chamber of Commerce named him its "Citizen of the Year" in 1978. Fisk University also awarded him the W.E.B. Dubois Lifetime Achievement Award in 1998.

Donaldson was the chairman of the board of trustees of his alma mater, Fisk University, when President Walter J. Leonard was forced to resign by wealthy donors in 1983.

== Death ==
Donaldson spent six months undergoing treatment for cancer in Florida, returned to the Bahamas in January, 2013. Donaldson died at his home in Winton, New Providence, Bahamas, on February 26, 2013, at the age of 79. He was survived by his former wife, Donna Ruth Penn, sons, David and Kevin, current wife Yolande Yasmin Parchment-Donaldson, and their daughter Tatiana.
