= Arthur Louis Schechter =

American lawyer (1939–2026)

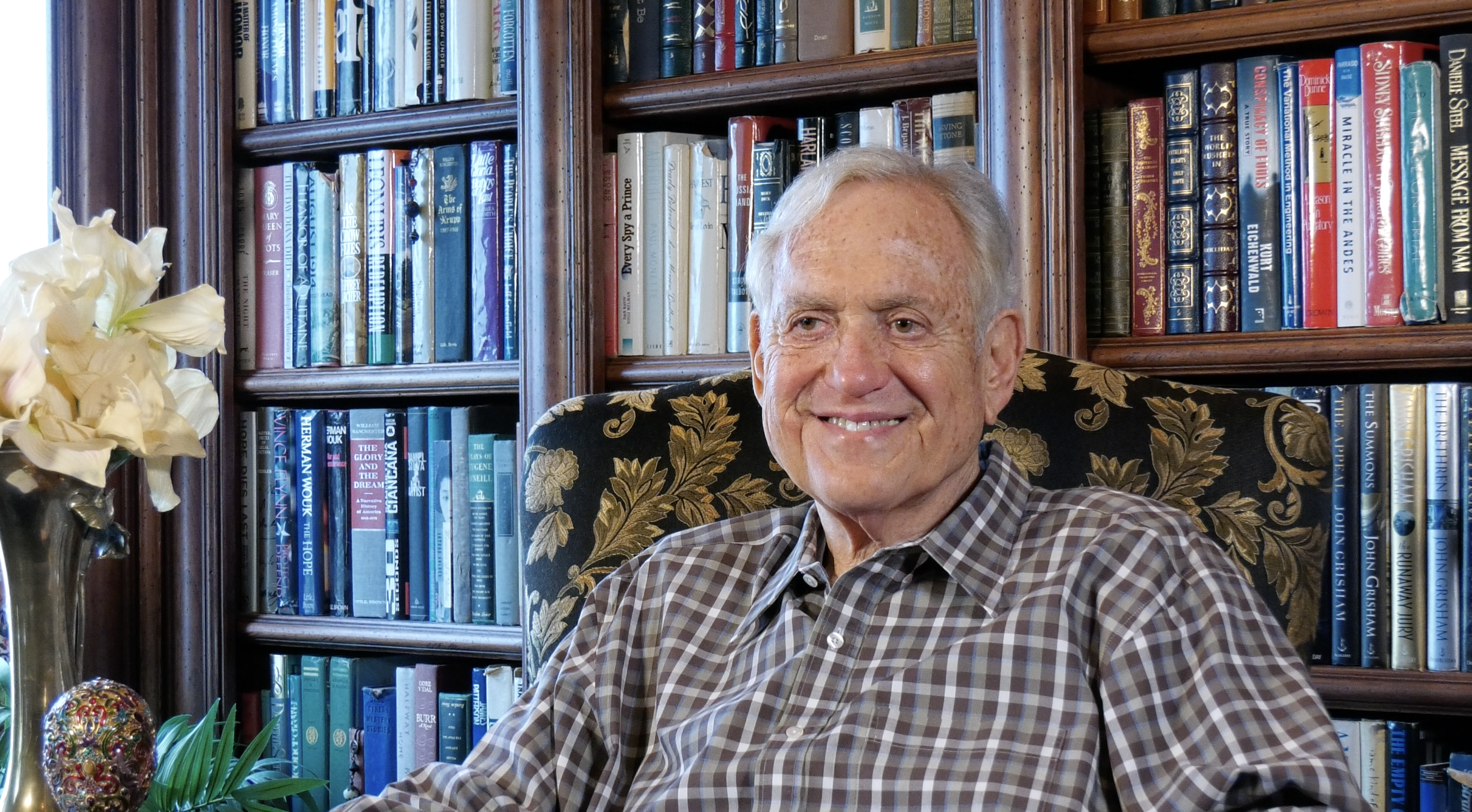
- Schechter in 2020

United States Ambassador to the Bahamas
- In office October 29, 1998 – March 1, 2001
- President: Bill Clinton; George W. Bush
- Preceded by: Sid Williams
- Succeeded by: J. Richard Blankenship

Personal details
- Born: December 6, 1939 Rosenberg, Texas, U.S.
- Died: April 13, 2026 (aged 86)
- Party: Democratic
- Spouse: Joyce Proler Schechter
- Profession: Diplomat, Attorney, Philanthropist

Arthur Louis Schechter (December 6, 1939 – April 13, 2026) was an American politician, diplomat, attorney and philanthropist.

== Early life ==
Schechter attended public schools and graduated from Lamar High School in Rosenberg, Texas. In 1958 Schechter graduated from the University of Texas in Plan II Honors Program with a BA in 1962. While there, he was a member of Phi Sigma Delta, the Friar Society, and the Silver Spurs.

He received a JD degree from the University of Texas Law School in 1964. He also subsequently attended the University of Houston for a master's degree in Political Science and Foreign Affairs.

== Career ==
Schechter was a senior partner at Schechter, Shaffer, and Harris based in Houston, Texas. His main practice was admiralty law, and he represented many maritime unions from around the world, including the National Maritime Union and the International Transport Workers' Federation

He was the United States Ambassador to the Bahamas. He was confirmed by the U.S. Senate and was appointed by President Bill Clinton on October 29, 1998. After returning, Schechter chaired the Harris County Metropolitan Transit Authority.

== Personal life and death ==
Schechter resided in Houston, Texas, with his wife, Joyce Proler Schechter, whom he married on August 25, 1956. They had two daughters: Leslie Rose Karpas (Hedley) born in 1966, and Jennifer Rose Schechter (Alan, Harris County Constable) born in 1968.

He was a member of the Westwood Country Club and Congregation Beth Israel.

Schechter died on April 13, 2026, at the age of 86.

Diplomatic posts
Preceded by Sidney Williams	United States Ambassador to Bahamas; 1998–2001	Succeeded by J. Richard Blankenship
