= Walter J. Leonard =

American lawyer and university administrator

- Born: October 3, 1929; Alma, Georgia, U.S.
- Died: December 8, 2015 (aged 86); Kensington, Maryland, U.S.
- Education: Morehouse College; Howard University School of Law
- Occupations: Lawyer, university administrator
- Spouse: Betty Singleton
- Children: 1 son, 1 daughter

Walter J. Leonard (October 3, 1929 – December 8, 2015) was an American lawyer and university administrator. As an administrator at Harvard University, he pioneered affirmative action in admissions. He was the president of Fisk University, a historically black university in Nashville, Tennessee, from 1977 to 1984.

== Early life ==
Leonard was born on October 3, 1929, in Alma, Georgia. He grew up in Savannah, Georgia, where his father worked for a railroad company and his mother was a midwife.

Leonard graduated from Morehouse College. He attended Savannah State University and Atlanta University, and he earned a law degree from the Howard University School of Law in 1968.

== Career ==
Leonard began his career as the assistant dean of the Howard University School of Law in 1968. He joined the Harvard Law School as "assistant dean and assistant admissions director" in 1969. In 1971, he became special assistant to Harvard University's President Derek Bok. He worked on the Harvard Plan, "one of the country's earliest and most effective affirmative-action programs, which became a model for other universities around the country." Leonard was also the chairman of the founding committee of the W. E. B. Du Bois Institute at Harvard University.

Leonard served as the president of Fisk University, a historically black university in Nashville, Tennessee, from 1977 to 1984. He fundraised $12 million, but refused to sell the university's art collection. He also invited Jesse Jackson to speak on campus which "some trustees feared would alienate white donors". Leonard was forced to resign after he "clashed with some of the university's biggest donors, who vowed not to give money to Fisk as long as Mr. Leonard was president." His letter of resignation, sent in November 1983, was addressed to Bahamian politician Timothy Donaldson, who was the chairman of the board of trustees at the time. Donaldson accepted the resignation; however, Leonard was asked to serve as president until the end of the academic year of 1983–1984.

Leonard was a "distinguished senior scholar" at his alma mater, Howard University, from 1984 to 1986, executive assistant to the governor of the U.S. Virgin Islands from 1987 to 1989, and the executive director of Communities in Schools from 1990 to 1994.

== Personal life, death and legacy ==
With his wife Betty Singleton, Leonard had a son and a daughter; they resided in Chevy Chase, Maryland. He died of Alzheimer's disease on December 8, 2015, at his retirement home in Kensington, Maryland, at age 86. His daughter, Angela Leonard, is an associate professor of History at Loyola University Maryland.
