= Bsous =

- Location in Lebanon
- Coordinates: 33°49′N 35°35′E
- Country: Lebanon
- Governorate: Mount Lebanon Governorate
- District: Aley District

Area
  - Total: 0.95 sq mi (2.46 km^{2})
- Time zone: UTC+2 (EET)
  - Summer (DST): +3

Bsous is a village in the Aley District of Mount Lebanon with an estimated population of 6,000. It is located 200 to 730 meters above sea level and 14 kilometres from the capital, Beirut. It is both a summer resort as well as being inhabited during the winter months. This is due to its proximity to Beirut. The name "Bsous" derives from the Syriac.

== Agriculture ==
Figue de barbarie, abricot, vigne, mure, olive

== Religion ==
The Maronite Catholic parish of Our Lady of Bsous is part of the Beirut diocese and has two churches:

- Notre Dame de Bsous
- St. Antoine de Padova

The Greek Orthodox parish of Bsous is part of the Mount Lebanon diocese and has one church:

- Notre Dame de Saidnaya

== Geography ==
Bsous is bordered by Aley, Kahale, Ain El Remaneh, Bdadoun, Wadi Chahrour, and Qmatiyeh. It is 200 to 730 meters above sea level and 15 km from Beirut. Bsous area is 2,457,139.61 m^{2} (sq meters)

== Educational institutions ==
- No Schools at Bsous

== Arts and Entertainment ==
- Bsous Silk Museum

== Streets and Landmarks ==
- Water fountain (El Ain)
- Virgin Mary Statue
- A 39-bell carillon
- Modern Olive Press - Eid Feghali

== Notable people ==
- Judge Roland El Chartouni
- Joseph Feghali, Grand Commander of the Papal Order of St Sylvester
- Michel Issa, United States ambassador to Lebanon since 2025
- Several retired public figures, to name a few: Dr Habib Abou-Sacr - Director General of the Ministry of Finance, Judge Choucri Sader, Judge Andre Sader
- Bsous is home to a large number of university professors, medical doctors, lawyers, and other accomplished individuals from all families

== Emigration ==
Like most other Lebanese towns, a large proportion of people from Bsous emigrated to different places around the world. There are people from Bsous who permanently live in the United States of America, United Kingdom, France, Australia, Mexico, Brazil, Canada and elsewhere. The pull factors for emigration are mostly: higher incomes, better availability of employment facilities and political stability.
