= Michel Issa =

American diplomat

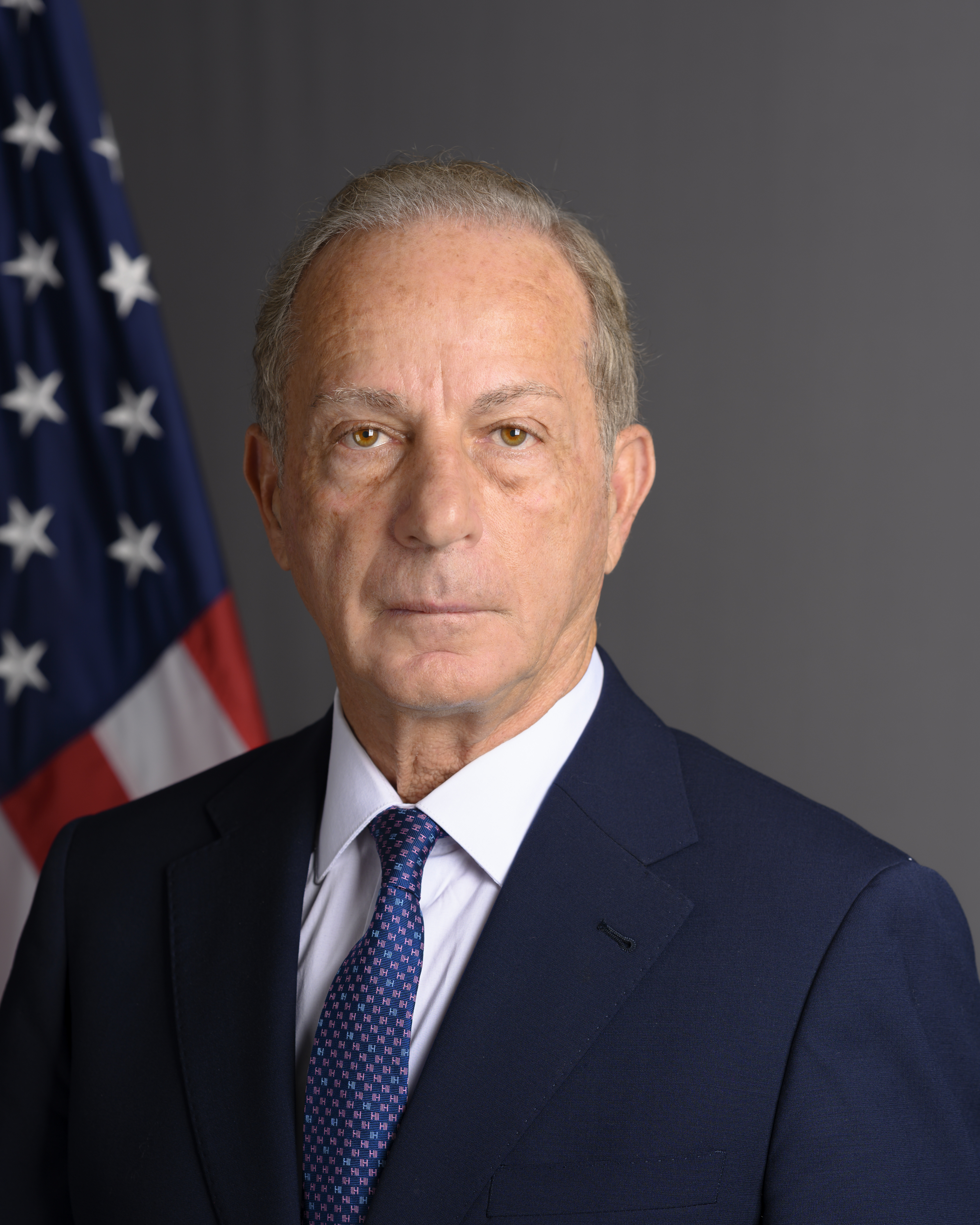
- Official portrait, 2025

United States Ambassador to Lebanon
- Incumbent
- Assumed office November 17, 2025
- President: Donald Trump
- Preceded by: Lisa A. Johnson

Personal details
- Born: 1955 (age 70–71) Bsous, Lebanon
- Education: Paris Nanterre University
- Occupation: Businessman, diplomat

Michel Issa (Arabic: ميشال عيسى; born 1955) is a Lebanese-American diplomat and businessman who has been serving as the United States ambassador to Lebanon since 2025.

== Early life and education ==
Issa was born in Bsous, a village in Lebanon's Aley District, and spent part of his childhood in Beirut before moving to Paris and later to New York. He studied economics at Paris Nanterre University and began his career in the banking sector, working for Arab and French banks including Crédit Agricole and Chase Manhattan Bank.

== Career ==
Issa has held senior executive positions in corporate finance, restructuring, and rehabilitation. According to publicly available professional information, he has overseen or advised on numerous restructuring and debt financing projects involving corporate and real estate clients. He is a Certified Public Accountant and a Chapter 11 Bankruptcy Trustee, and has lectured at several business schools.

== U.S. ambassador to Lebanon (2025–present) ==
=== Nomination and confirmation ===
On March 24, 2025, President Donald Trump nominated Issa as the United States ambassador to Lebanon. The nomination was referred to the Senate Committee on Foreign Relations, which held hearings on July 29, 2025, and reported the nomination favorably on September 17, 2025. The Senate invoked cloture and confirmed his nomination on October 6, 2025, by a 50–45 vote.

During his confirmation hearing, Issa said that efforts to strengthen Lebanon's financial systems and reinforce state sovereignty would be priorities during his tenure.

=== Tenure ===
Issa succeeded Ambassador Lisa Johnson, whose term concluded in late September 2025. In April 2026, Issa informed Lebanese officials that Lebanon must designate Hezbollah as a terrorist organization, both politically and military.

== Personal life ==
Issa was born in Lebanon to a Maronite Christian family and later naturalized as an American citizen. He stated during his Senate confirmation hearing that he voluntarily renounced his Lebanese citizenship prior to assuming his diplomatic role. He currently resides in New York City.

Issa is married and has two sons. He speaks French and Arabic in addition to English.
