= Ned L. Siegel =

American diplomat (born 1951)

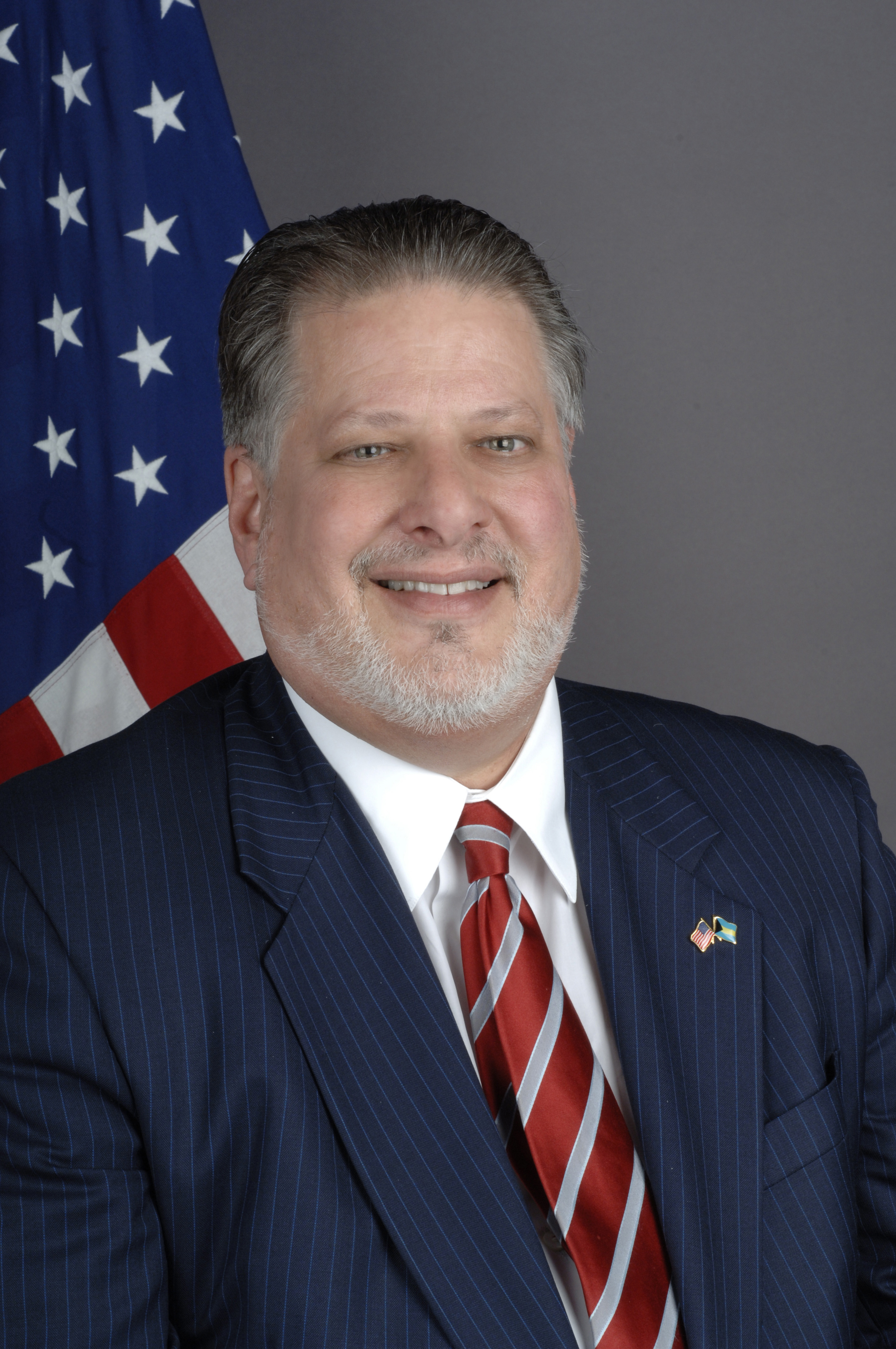
- Siegel in 2009

Ambassador of the United States to the Bahamas
- In office October 26, 2007 – January 20, 2009
- President: George W. Bush
- Preceded by: John D. Rood
- Succeeded by: Nicole Avant

U.S. Representative to the United Nations
- In office 2006–2007
- President: George W. Bush

Personal details
- Born: Ned Lawrence Siegel; September 26, 1951 (age 74) Newark, New Jersey, U.S.
- Party: Republican
- Education: University of Connecticut (BA); Dickinson School of Law (JD); University of South Carolina (DBA-Hon.Causa)

Ned Lawrence Siegel (born September 26, 1951) is an American diplomat, lawyer, and businessman who served as the United States ambassador to the Bahamas from 2007 to 2009. He is a member of the Republican Party.

== Education ==
Siegel graduated Phi Beta Kappa from the University of Connecticut in 1973 with a Bachelor of Arts in Political Science, and earned a Juris Doctor from Penn State University in 1976.

After 40 years of entrepreneurial accomplishments he was awarded an Honorary Doctor of Business Administration from the University of South Carolina in 2014.

== Career ==
Siegel began his career as a clerk for Chief Justice Mitchell Harry Cohen in the Federal District Court in Camden, New Jersey. He worked at the New Jersey law firm of Kimmelman, Wolff & Samson.

Siegel joined The Howard Siegel Companies Group in 1977, a developer of residential properties. In 1980, he founded and was partner of the Weingarten-Siegel Group, Inc. the 42nd largest real estate developer in the U.S. In 1997, he founded The Siegel Group.

In 2006, Siegel was appointed Representative of the United States to the United Nations (2006–2007).

In June 2014, Siegel was named Of Counsel to Wildes & Weinberg, P.C.

Siegel was also the plaintiff in the 2000 lawsuit Siegel v. LePore. Siegel, along with Republican candidates George W. Bush and Richard Cheney, filed a lawsuit against members of county canvassing boards in Florida claiming that the manual recounts of ballots in specific counties violated the First and Fourteenth Amendments of the U.S. Constitution and infringed on voters' rights to due process and equal protection. While the outcome of this case ruled against the plaintiffs, it was one of several significant legal battles during the 2000 election turmoil that preceded the Bush v. Gore decision at the U.S. Supreme Court level.

== U.S. ambassador to the Bahamas (2007–2009) ==
Siegel's commitment to public service earned him recognition, when Florida Governor Jeb Bush appointed him to the Enterprise Florida Inc.’s (EFI) Board of Directors. He served on the Space Research and Commerce Park Planning and Development Committee at the John F. Kennedy Space Center.

In 2003, President George W. Bush gave him a presidential appointment to the Overseas Private Investment Corporation Board of Directors, where he served until 2007. In 2006, President Bush appointed him to serve under Ambassador John Bolton as the senior advisor to the U.S. Mission and as the U.S. representative to the 61st Session of the United Nations General Assembly.

In 2007, he was asked to serve as U.S. Ambassador of the Commonwealth of the Bahamas, using his expertise and business experiences to oversee all U.S. Embassy – Nassau operations.

In 1997, Siegel founded The Siegel Group USA where he currently devotes most of his time, supporting local civic organizations, bringing Israeli companies to the United States and U.S. companies to Israel. His expertise earning him the appointment on several U.S.-Israeli trade missions between 2007-2017 including those of Florida Governors: Jeb Bush, Charlie Crist and Rick Scott where they established a memorandum of understanding between Florida and Israel on bilateral cooperation in private sector industrial research and development.

Siegel is an advisor and co-founder of the U.S. Medical Glove Company, which provides medical, industrial and military workers with critical Personal protective equipment both domestically and to U.S. allies overseas. He has assisted them in securing partnerships with the United States Department of Defense, and in the Gulf Cooperation Council, specifically Saudi Arabia and the United Arab Emirates.

== Personal life ==
Siegel grew up in Livingston, New Jersey. During his years at the University of Connecticut he played varsity basketball and was on the 1970's All-Decades varsity lacrosse team. Siegel is Jewish and has been deeply involved in Jewish community life. He first visited Israel with his parents in 1967 after the Six-Day War, this visit led to an epiphany in "conversation with God" about dedicating his work to the Jewish community, leading his to hold numerous leadership positions across prominent organizations.

He served on the national Board of Directors for the Republican Jewish Coalition in Washington, D.C., and led its Florida chapter as Chairman.His commitment also extends to the American Jewish Committee, where he was a board member of the South Central Florida Chapter, and to the Jewish National Fund, where he held the role of Co-President for the South Palm Beach County Region.

In addition to these roles, Siegel actively supports the Israeli Bonds program and is engaged in the spiritual life of his community through Chabad Lubavitch of Greater Boynton, where he previously served as Executive Chairman of the Executive Committee.

The Siegel family is an advocate of fighting against breast cancer. Siegel's wife, Stephanie, is the Board Member and Founder of the Bahamian Breast Cancer Initiative Foundation. As a breast cancer survivor, Stephanie Siegel's organization facilitates research, improves access to treatment, and increases awareness of the disease that affects Bahamian women at the world's highest levels.
