= Sid Williams =

American football player and diplomat (born 1942)

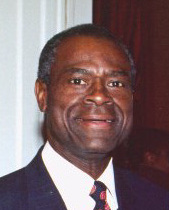

United States Ambassador to the Bahamas
- In office March 27, 1994 – January 11, 1998
- President: Bill Clinton
- Preceded by: John S. Ford
- Succeeded by: Arthur Louis Schechter

Personal details
- Born: Sidney Williams; March 24, 1942 (age 84) Shreveport, Louisiana, U.S.
- Party: Democratic
- Spouse: Maxine Waters (m. 1977)
- Children: 2
- Education: Pepperdine University (MA)
- Football career

No. 67, 64, 52
- Position: Linebacker

Personal information
- Listed height: 6 ft 2 in (1.88 m)
- Listed weight: 235 lb (107 kg)

Career information
- High school: Wheatley (Houston, Texas)
- College: Southern
- NFL draft: 1964: 16th round, 222nd overall pick

Career history
- Cleveland Browns (1964–1966); Washington Redskins (1967); Baltimore Colts (1968); Pittsburgh Steelers (1969)

Awards and highlights
- 2× NFL champion (1964, 1968)

Career NFL statistics
- Games played: 70
- Touchdowns: 1
- Interceptions: 1
- Fumbles recovered: 1
- Stats at Pro Football Reference

Sidney Williams (born March 24, 1942) is an American former diplomat and American football linebacker in the National Football League (NFL) for the Cleveland Browns, Washington Redskins, Baltimore Colts, and the Pittsburgh Steelers. He played college football at Southern University.

== Early life ==
Williams was born on March 24, 1942, in Shreveport, Louisiana, and grew up in Houston, Texas. He attended and played high school football at Wheatley High School, graduating in 1959.

== College career ==
Williams attended and played college football at Southern University in Baton Rouge, Louisiana. Later, he earned a master's degree at Pepperdine University.

== Professional career ==
Williams was drafted in the 16th round (222nd overall) of the 1964 NFL draft by the Cleveland Browns, where he played from 1964 to 1966, and was a member of the 1964 NFL Champion Browns team. After a contract dispute with the Browns in 1967, he was traded to the New York Giants in 1967 for a draft selection, but was released a few weeks later. Williams was then signed by the Washington Redskins, where he played in 1967. He also played for the Baltimore Colts and the Pittsburgh Steelers.

On June 4, 1967, along with several other Black athletes and one Black political leader, Williams participated in what is now known as the "Cleveland Summit" or the "Muhammad Ali Summit" in Cleveland, Ohio, followed by a press conference, to express support for Muhammad Ali, who was to stand trial for refusing to submit to the military draft.

== Sales career ==
Williams was employed as a sales representative at Mercedes-Benz Hollywood, Inc. in Hollywood, California, from 1979 to 1994.

== Political and civil service career ==
Williams worked as a business developer with the Black Economic Union in Los Angeles, California, and served as a legislative aide for Los Angeles City Councilman David S. Cunningham Jr. He then served as the United States Ambassador to the Bahamas under the Clinton Administration from 1994 to 1998.

== Personal life ==
Williams is the husband of Representative Maxine Waters, who represents California's 43rd congressional district.

Diplomatic posts
Preceded by John S. Ford	United States Ambassador to Bahamas; 1994–1998	Succeeded by Arthur Louis Schechter
