= John D. Rood =

American ambassador (born 1955)

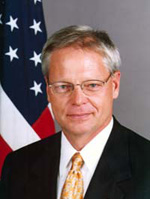

11th United States Ambassador to the Bahamas
- In office September 1, 2004 – April 10, 2007
- President: George W. Bush
- Preceded by: J. Richard Blankenship
- Succeeded by: Ned Siegel

Personal details
- Born: February 11, 1955 (age 71)
- Party: Republican

John D. Rood (born February 11, 1955) is an American businessman and diplomat who served as the United States Ambassador to the Bahamas from 2004 to 2007.

Rood is chairman and Founder of The Vestcor Companies, Inc. He is a graduate of University of Montana with a bachelor's degree in business administration.

== Early life and education ==
Rood earned a bachelor's degree from the University of Montana.

== Career ==
=== Business ===
Rood founded The Vestcor Companies in 1983 and has served as its chairman. The company is based in Jacksonville, Florida and works in multifamily development and investment. The company acquired thousands of apartment units across multiple market segments, including affordable, student, and luxury housing.

=== Diplomacy ===
On May 6, 2004, President George W. Bush announced his intention to nominate Rood as ambassador to the Commonwealth of the Bahamas. He was appointed on August 2, 2004, presented credentials on September 1, 2004, and left post on April 10, 2007.

=== Boards and public service ===
Rood has held various civic and corporate board roles. He has served on the board of directors of Fidelity National Financial since 2013 and has also served on the board of Black Knight. He was appointed by Florida governors and the City of Jacksonville to serve on the Florida Fish and Wildlife Conservation Commission (until 2004), the Florida Board of Governors (until 2013), and the JAXPORT board (2015–2016).

In October 2015, the City of Jacksonville announced Rood among new appointments to city boards, including the JAXPORT board of directors.

Rood has also served on the Florida Prepaid College Board; Florida's governor announced his reappointment to that board in 2023.

=== Educational activity ===
Rood founded Jacksonville Classical Academy, a Florida charter school.

== See also ==
- List of ambassadors of the United States to the Bahamas
