= American College of Medical Technology =

Coordinates: 33.893°N 118.284°W

Established	1974
School type	College
Founder	Donald Harrison
President	Daniel Dorim Kim
Location	Carson, California, USA
Homepage	www.acmt.ac

The American College of Medical Technology was a for-profit non-degree-granting occupational institution. The college was founded by Donald Harrison in 1974 as the American School of X-Ray. In July 1996, Daniel Dorim Kim purchased the school and changed the name to the American College of Medical Technology (ACMT). The school's accreditation was terminated in 2007. In 2008, Kim resigned the presidency. The school has since closed.

== Instruction and accreditation ==
ACMT offered courses in the use of medical technology such as MRI scanners. Former students reported a number of problems with the courses offered, including a lack of hands-on training with appropriate machinery, incorrect or out-of-date textbooks, and instructors who were not familiar with the material.

The college had obtained accreditation through the Accrediting Commission of Career Schools and Colleges of Technology, but ACMT's accreditation was revoked in 2007.

== House Committee hearings ==
On March 1, 2005, the U.S. House Committee on Education and the Workforce held hearings on "Enforcement of Federal Anti-Fraud Laws in For-Profit Education". During these hearings, Representative Maxine Waters cited ACMT as a "problem school" in her district, California's 35th congressional district. She noted that at least two lawsuits had been filed by disgruntled students, and capped her statement with the opinion that the school's MRI program "does not meet the minimum completion/placement rules under California law".

Other issues have arisen in that they did not administer required Ability to Benefit exams to potential students who lacked GED's or high school diplomas. Accusations of unscrupulous financial aid officers have also been highlighted in which claims of forgery of having received high school diplomas but never being put on file have been made. This in turn resulted in numerous unqualified students taking out loans and never finishing required programs or having the ability to obtain licensure.
