= Kimberly Furnish =

American diplomat

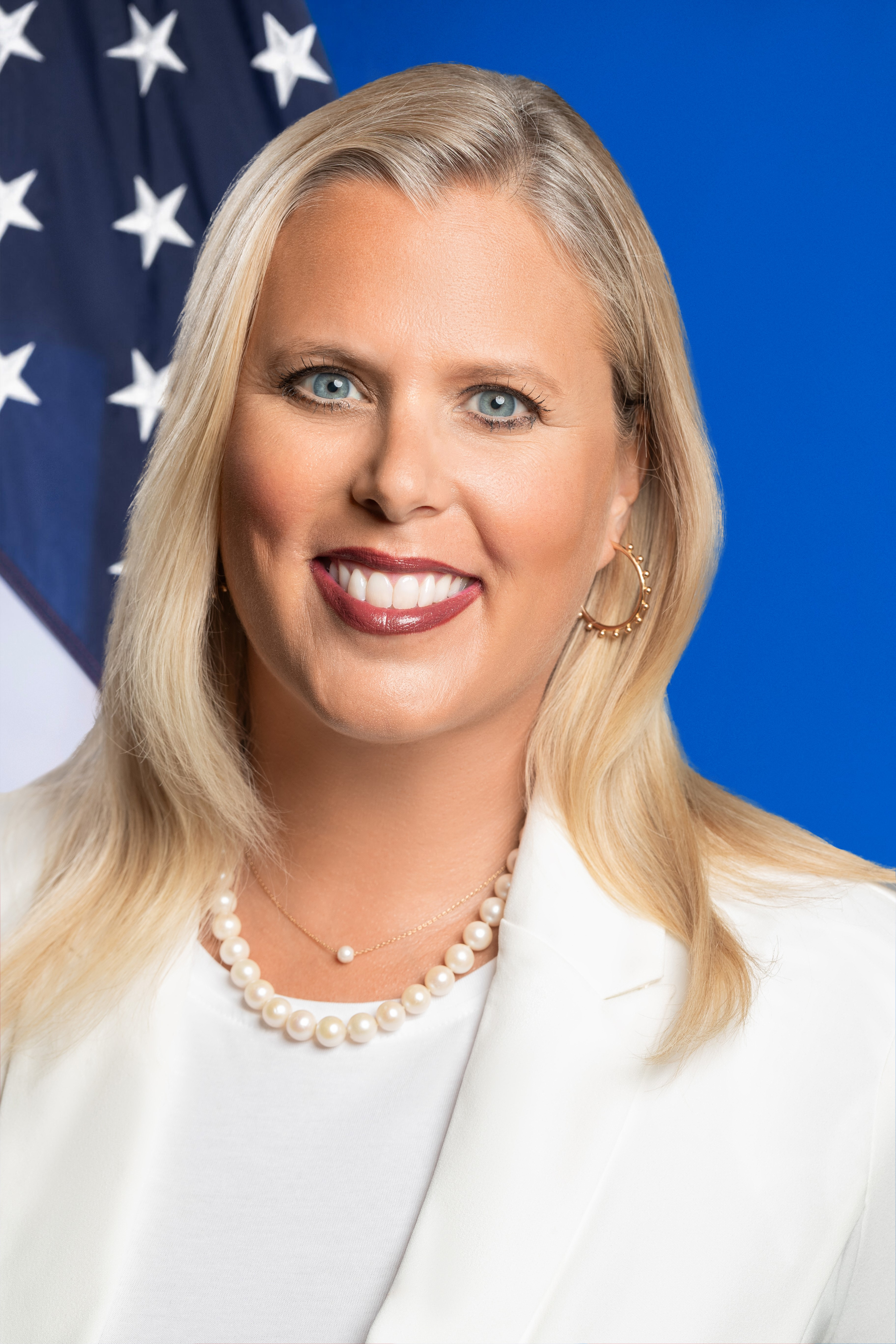
- Official portrait, 2024

United States Chargé d'affaires to The Bahamas
- In office June 24, 2024 – December 4, 2025
- President: Joe Biden; Donald Trump
- Preceded by: Michael P. Taylor
- Succeeded by: Herschel Walker (as Ambassador)

Personal details
- Education: Tulane University

Kimberly Furnish is an American diplomat who is serving as Deputy Chief of Mission to The Bahamas since June 2024. Prior to her tenure in The Bahamas she worked at multiple American consulates and embassies in which she was tasked with protecting American citizens, including those attending the 2018 Winter Olympics.

== Early life ==
Kimberly Furnish graduated from Tulane University with a bachelor's degree.

== Career ==
Furnish was the Director of American Citizen Services & Crisis Management in the United States Department of State. As director she was tasked with protecting American citizens abroad. At the American consulate in Karachi, Pakistan, she was the International Narcotics and Law Enforcement Attaché. In South Korea Furnish was Chief of American Citizen Services at the American embassy. Furnish worked at American embassies in Melbourne, Seoul, Bogota, and Curaçao. She has worked in the Bureau of Consular Affairs and Bureau of African Affairs.

In 2018, Furnish was the leader of the team tasked with providing services to Americans visiting South Korea for the 2018 Winter Olympics. She was also the control officer for Vice President Mike Pence during the Olympics.

Furnish became the United States' chargé d'affaires to The Bahamas in June 2024. The American embassy in the Bahamas was relocated from Queen Street to the New Embassy Compound during her tenure. She has been critical of Cuban medical internationalism and accused it of having "human rights issues". Herschel Walker was nominated by President Donald Trump to be ambassador to The Bahamas.

== Works cited ==
=== News ===
- Campbell, Keile (March 19, 2025). "US Chargé d'Affaires downplays impact of Cuba policy on Bahamas". Tribune242. Archived from the original on June 19, 2025.
- Freiman, Jordan (December 17, 2024). "Trump taps Herschel Walker for ambassador to the Bahamas". CBS News. Archived from the original on June 19, 2025.

=== Web ===
- "Biography". U.S. Embassy in the Bahamas. June 24, 2024. Archived from the original on June 19, 2025.
- "U.S. Embassy celebrates Ribbon Cutting for New Embassy Compound". U.S. Embassy in the Bahamas. June 24, 2024. Archived from the original on June 19, 2025.
