= Lisa A. Johnson =

American diplomat (born 1967)

Lisa Anne Johnson
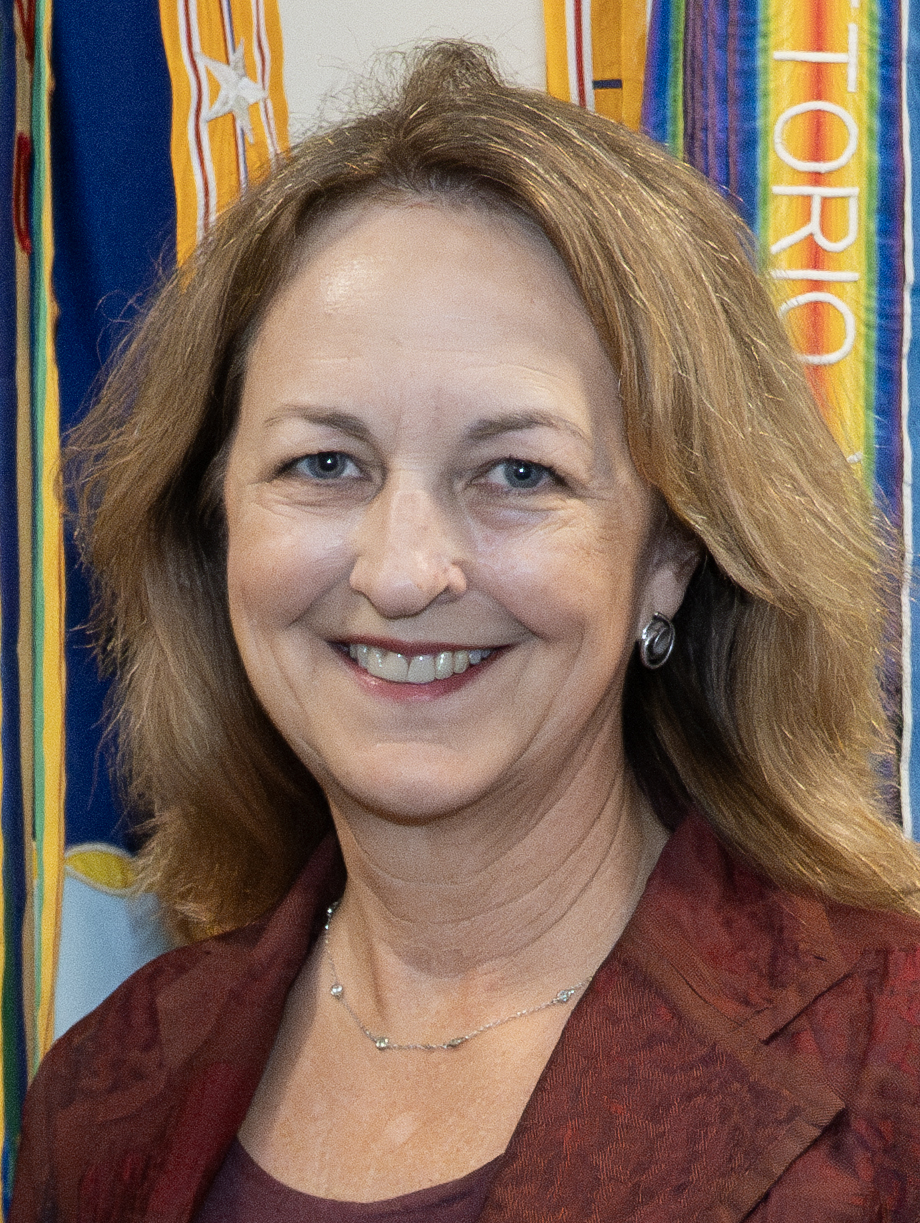
- Johnson in 2024

United States Ambassador to Lebanon
- In office January 11, 2024 – September 28, 2025
- President: Joe Biden; Donald Trump
- Preceded by: Dorothy Shea
- Succeeded by: Michel Issa

United States Ambassador to Namibia
- In office February 21, 2018 – July 2, 2021
- President: Donald Trump; Joe Biden
- Preceded by: Thomas F. Daughton
- Succeeded by: Randy W. Berry

United States Chargé d'affaires to The Bahamas
- In office July 9, 2014 – November 9, 2017
- President: Barack Obama; Donald Trump
- Preceded by: John W. Dinkelman (Charge d'affaires)
- Succeeded by: James Herren (Charge d'affaries)

Personal details
- Born: Lisa Anne Johnson; 1967 (age 58–59)
- Education: Stanford University; Columbia University; National War College

Lisa Anne Johnson (born 1967) is an American diplomat who served as the United States ambassador to Lebanon from 2024 to 2025. She previously served as the United States ambassador to Namibia from 2018 to 2021 and as United States Chargé d'affaires to The Bahamas from 2014 to 2017.

== Early life and education ==
Johnson earned master's degrees from the National War College and Columbia University, as well as a bachelor's degree from Stanford University.

== Diplomatic career ==
Johnson is a career member of the Senior Foreign Service, having served as the deputy assistant secretary of the Bureau of International Narcotics and Law Enforcement Affairs. Johnson previously served the United States Ambassador to Namibia from 2018 to 2021 and chargé d’affaires at the U.S. Embassy in Nassau, Bahamas, from 2014 to 2017. Her overseas posts have included time at U.S. embassies in Beirut, Lebanon; Islamabad, Pakistan; Luanda, Angola; and Pretoria, South Africa. Johnson was also posted to the Office of the Secretary General of NATO in Brussels, Belgium. She has also served as a senior official at the U.S. State Department, National Security Council and Vice President's Office.

=== U.S. Ambassador to Namibia (2018–2021) ===
On October 5, 2017, President Donald Trump nominated Johnson to serve as the U.S. Ambassador to Namibia. She served in this role from 2018 to 2021.

=== U.S. ambassador to Lebanon (2024–2025) ===
On February 13, 2023, President Joe Biden nominated Johnson to be the next ambassador to Lebanon. Hearings on her nomination were held before the Senate Foreign Relations Committee on May 16, 2023. Her nomination was favorably reported to the Senate floor on June 1, 2023. She was confirmed by the Senate by voice vote on December 14, 2023. She arrived in Lebanon on January 11, 2024. She presented her credentials on February 6, 2025.

On October 11, 2024, Johnson declared support for the Israeli invasion of Lebanon and Israel’s efforts to “eliminate Hezbollah completely, beyond just degrading its military capabilities.” According to pro-Hezbollah sources, she was reportedly working to “prepare Lebanon for an era after Hezbollah” while calling on Lebanese people to “rise up and free themselves from Hezbollah.”

== Personal life ==
Johnson speaks French and Portuguese.

Diplomatic posts
Preceded by John W. Dinkelman (Charge d'affaires)	United States Charge d'affaires to the Bahamas; 2014–2017	Succeeded by James Herren (Charge d'affaries)
Preceded by Thomas F. Daughton	United States Ambassador to Namibia; 2017–2021	Succeeded by Randy W. Berry
Preceded by Dorothy Shea	United States Ambassador to Lebanon; 2024-present	Incumbent
