= Margaret MacDonald (visionary) =

Scottish visionary (1815–1840)

Margaret MacDonald (1815–1840) was a Scottish visionary.

== Life ==
Margaret MacDonald was born in 1815 in Port Glasgow, Scotland and died around 1840. She lived with her two older brothers, James and George, both of whom ran a shipping business.

== Vision ==
Beginning in 1826 and through 1829, a few preachers in Scotland emphasized that the world's problems could only be addressed through an outbreak of supernatural gifts from the Holy Spirit. In response, Isabella and Mary Campbell of the parish of Rosneath manifested charismatic experiences such as speaking in tongues. Around 1830, miraculous healings were reported through James Campbell, first of his sister Margaret MacDonald and then of Mary Campbell (through James's letter to Mary). Shortly thereafter, James and George MacDonald manifested the speaking and interpretations of tongues, and soon others followed suit in prayer meetings. These charismatic experiences garnered major national attention. Many came to see and investigate these events. Some, such as Edward Irving and Henry Drummond, regarded these events as genuine displays from the Holy Spirit. Others, including John Nelson Darby and Benjamin Wills Newton, whom the Plymouth Brethren sent on their behalf to investigate, came to the conclusion that these displays were demonic. Some attempts to identify the origin of Darby's concept of the rapture imply that Darby's concepts originated from a false source. Samuel Prideaux Tregelles alleged that the concept was taken from one of the charismatic utterances in Edward Irving's church. Since Tregelles regarded the utterances as "pretending to be from God," his implication is that Darby's rapture is from a demonic source. Dave MacPherson built upon Tregelles's accusation, and argued that the source for Darby's rapture was from Margaret MacDonald's 1830 vision.

However, scholars think there are major obstacles that render these accusations untenable. It is clear that Darby regarded the 1830 charismatic manifestations as demonic and not of God. Darby would not have borrowed an idea from a source that he clearly thought was demonic. Also Darby had already written out his pretribulation rapture views in January 1827, three years prior to the 1830 events and any MacDonald utterance. When MacDonald's utterance is read closely, her statements appear to present a posttribulationist scenario ("being the fiery trial which is to try us" and "for the purging and purifying of the real members of the body of Jesus"). Confusion on this point was enhanced because while MacDonald's vision as first published in 1840 describes a posttribulation view of the rapture, a version published in 1861 lacked two important passages that appear to present a posttribulation view: "This is the fiery trial which is to try us. - It will be for the purging and purifying of the real members of the body of Jesus" and "The trial of the Church is from Antichrist. It is by being filled with the Spirit that we shall be kept". For these and other reasons, dispensational scholars consider MacPherson's alleged connection to dispensationalism as untenable.

== See also ==
- Catholic Apostolic Church
