= Margaret Evangeline McDonald =

Bahamian diplomat (1922–2001)

Margaret Evangeline McDonald CVO CBE (April 1922 – 2001) was the first female Ambassador to the United States from the Bahamas, from 1985 until 1992. She was the first woman appointed Secretary to the Cabinet, in 1982.

McDonald was born in Tarpum Bay, Eleuthera, in April 1922. In 1948, she married the educator Luther Haldene McDonald.

McDonald graduated from the University of Pittsburgh Graduate School of Public and International Affairs.
