= Robert M. Witajewski =

American diplomat (born 1946)

Robert M. Witajewski (born November 17, 1946) is an American former diplomat who was a Senior Member of the American Foreign Service.

== Biography ==
Witajewski was born in Saginaw, Michigan on November 17, 1946.

== Education ==
In 1964 he graduated from Holy Rosary High School.

He is known to possess degrees from the University of Michigan, the University of California at Berkeley, and Princeton University.

== Career ==
From 1983 to 1985, Witajewski worked with the Supreme Electoral Tribunal in Guatemala to create and implement new balloting systems.

From 1986 to 1988, Witajewski served as the Officer in Charge for Nicaragua and Belize, playing a key role in the electoral defeat of the Sandinista National Liberation Front and election of Violetta Chamorro.

Witajewski began work in Lima, Peru in 1992, weeks after then-President Fujimori carried out the 1992 "auto-golpe", or self-coup. He served as a key interface between international groups monitoring the fairness of three constitutional and congressional elections that returned Peru to constitutional governance.

Between 1994 and 1997, Witajewski served as the Principal Officer at the US Consulate in Hermosillo, Mexico. During his time at this post, he worked with the governments of Sonora and Arizona to promote cross-border cooperation including economic investment and collaboration on drug interdiction.

Between 1998 and 2002, Witajewski served as Deputy Coordinator for Cuban Affairs and Deputy Director and Acting Director in the Office of Brazil & Southern cone affairs in the United States Department of State. During this period he represented the State Department at inter-governmental meetings regarding the Argentine financial crisis.

Witajewski was one of two State Department staffers to work with Princeton University’s Woodrow Wilson School of Public and International Affairs Masters in Public Policy program. Prior to this he served for three years at the U.S. Interests Section at the Swiss Embassy in Havana, working closely with the democratic opposition in Cuba.

Under President George W. Bush, Witajewski served as Bureau of International Narcotics and Law Enforcement Country Director in Iraq. From July 2003 to September 2004, he served in Nassau, The Bahamas as Chargé d'affaires ad interim or temporary Chief of Mission. While there, he was responsible for evacuating the embassy three times due to oncoming Category Four and Five hurricanes. Additionally, he helped facilitate covert conversation between CARICOM and the United States following the 2004 overthrow of Haitian President Jean-Bertrand Aristide.

In May 2008, Witajewski represented the US Department of State as the Director for the Office of Regional Affairs at the 7th meeting of the Council for Security Cooperation in the Asia Pacific Study Group on Countering the Proliferation of Weapons of Mass Destruction in the Asia-Pacific, in Ho Chi Minh City, Vietnam.
