= List of Baltic Academy Award winners and nominees =

This is a list of Academy Award winners and nominees from Baltic countries: Estonia, Latvia and Lithuania. This list is current as of the 97th Academy Awards.

== Best Supporting Actress ==
Supporting Actress
Year	Name	Country	Film	Status	Milestone / Notes
1938	Miliza Korjus	(Estonia)	The Great Waltz	Nominated	Polish Born Actress

== International Feature Film ==
This list focuses on films from Baltic countries that won or were nominated for the International Feature Film award.

International Feature Film
Year	Film	Country	Director	Status	Milestone / Notes
2014	Tangerines	(Estonia)	Zaza Urushadze	Nominated	
2024	Flow	(Latvia)	Gints Zilbalodis	Nominated	

== Animated Feature ==
This list focuses on Baltic films that won or were nominated for the Best Animated Feature award.

Animated Feature
Year	Name	Country	Film	Status	Milestone / Notes
2024	Gints Zilbalodis	(Latvia)	Flow	Won	

== Music ==
=== Original Song ===
Original Song
Year	Name	Country	Film	Song	Status	Milestone / Notes
1983	Dave Grusin	(Latvia)	Tootsie	"It Might Be You"	Nominated	Shared with Alan and Marilyn Bergman

=== Original Score ===
Original Score
Year	Name	Country	Film	Status	Milestone / Notes
1979	Dave Grusin	(Latvia)	Heaven Can Wait	Nominated	Grusin was born in the US, but his father was born and raised in Latvia.
1980	Dave Grusin	(Latvia)	The Champ	Nominated	
1982	Dave Grusin	(Latvia)	On Golden Pond	Nominated	
1989	Dave Grusin	(Latvia)	The Milagro Beanfield War	Won	
1990	Dave Grusin	(Latvia)	The Fabulous Baker Boys	Nominated	
1991	Dave Grusin	(Latvia)	Havana	Nominated	
1994	Dave Grusin	(Latvia)	The Firm	Nominated	

== Number of nominations/wins by country ==
Country	No. of nominations	No. of wins
Latvia	9	1
Estonia	3	0
Lithuania	0	0
