= Klionsky =

Klionsky (Russian: Клионский) is a surname of Russian origin. Notable people with the surname include:

- Daniel J. Klionsky (born 1958), American biochemist and molecular biologist
- Marc Klionsky (1927–2017), Russian-American artist
