= Maryland–Estonia National Guard Partnership =

Military partnership between Maryland (USA) and Estonia

Maryland–Estonia State Partnership
- Part of the U.S. European Command State Partnership Program
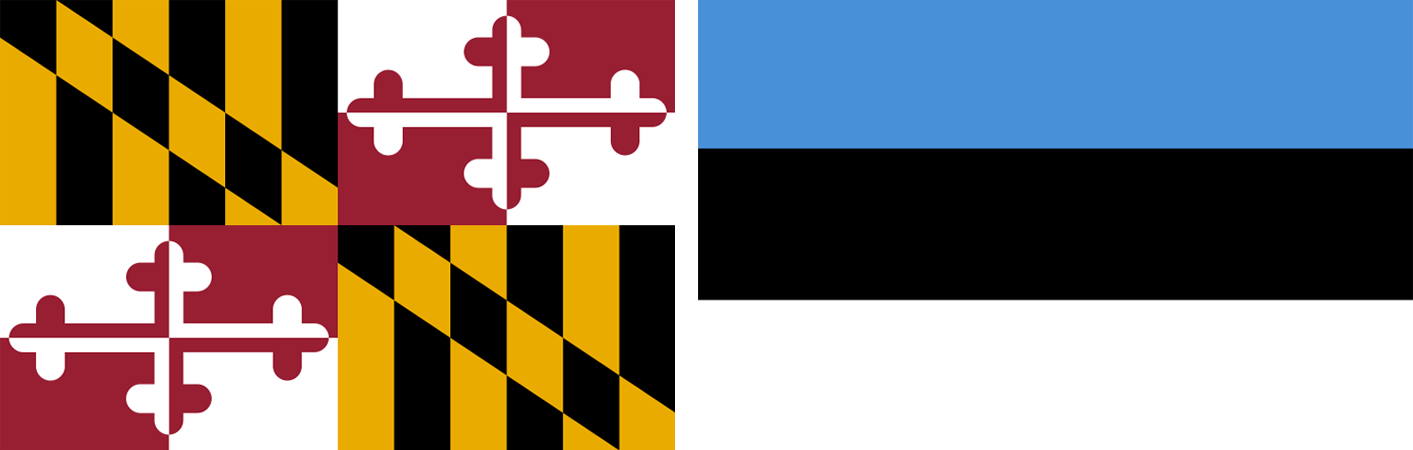
- Origin: 1993
- Country president: Toomas Hendrik Ilves
- Prime minister: Andrus Ansip
- Minister of defense: Urmas Reinsalu
- Ambassador to U.S.: Marina Kaljurand
- Ambassador to Estonia: James D. Melville Jr.
- Adjutant general: MG Timothy E. Gowen
- 2012 Engagements: 9
- NATO member: Yes (2004)
- EU member: Yes (2004)

Estonia

The Maryland–Estonia National Guard Partnership is one of 25 European partnerships that make-up the U.S. European Command State Partnership Program and one of 88 worldwide partnerships that make-up the National Guard State Partnership Program. The partnership serves as a success model to other nations.

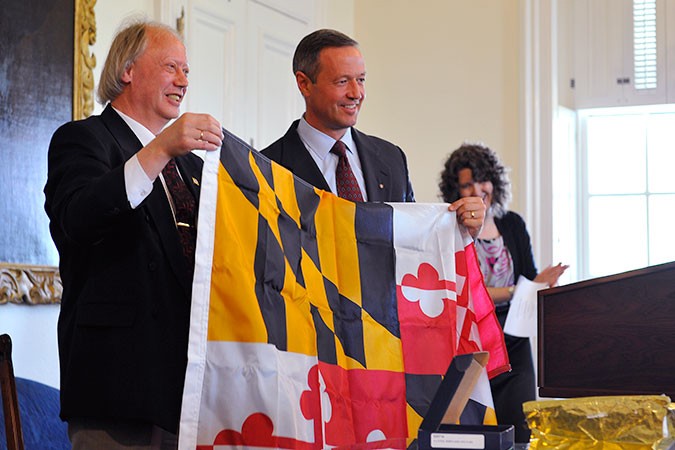
Maryland's governor and Estonia's deputy governor sign a memorandum of understanding in 2009 - an extension of the relationship begun in 1993 - designed to encourage and strengthen cultural and social relationships between the two countries.

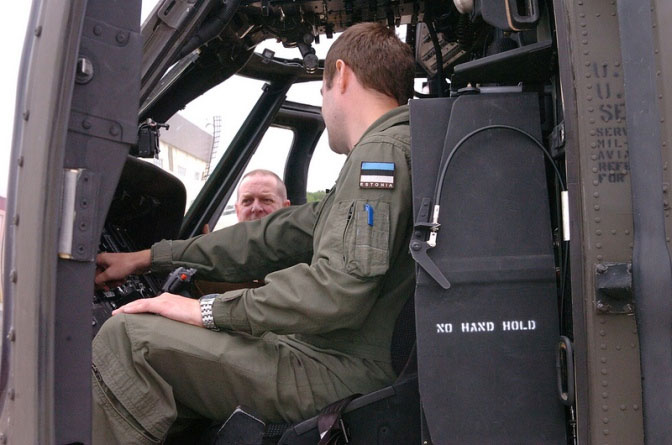
The Estonian ambassador to the United States visits the Army Aviation Support Facility in Maryland to meet with Estonian Air Force pilots training with the Maryland Army National Guard.

== History ==
Estonia's accession to the European Union and NATO occurred in 2004, and to the Eurozone in Jan 2011. The Estonian economy has recovered to pre-crisis levels and is reporting approximately 1.9% growth.

Major concerns are energy security, cyber defense, emigration "brain drain" and initial defense. NATO is the cornerstone of Estonia's National Security. Their defense model focuses on Initial Defense and NATO led Expeditionary Operations.

Estonia cooperates extensively with Latvia and Lithuania on joint military exercises. However, Estonia views itself primarily as a Nordic country, not Baltic and has close cultural and governmental ties with those countries.

== Partnership focus ==
The current focus of the Maryland-Estonia Partnership is purely military-to-military based and includes ISAF Operational Support, Cyber Defense, Special Operations Forces (SOF) development, EST Air Force development, and the development of a Veteran Care/Warrior Warrior Program. To this end, Estonia hopes to improve training and force protection in support of ISAF and export expertise in cyber defense, explosive ordnance disposal, and E-governance to other NATO/EU nations. Additionally, Estonia seeks opportunities to increase their support of international operations, co-deployments with MD and enhanced regional M2M/Security Cooperation efforts.

== See also ==
- Maryland Estonia Exchange Council
