= Elizabeth K. Horst =

American diplomat

Elizabeth Horst
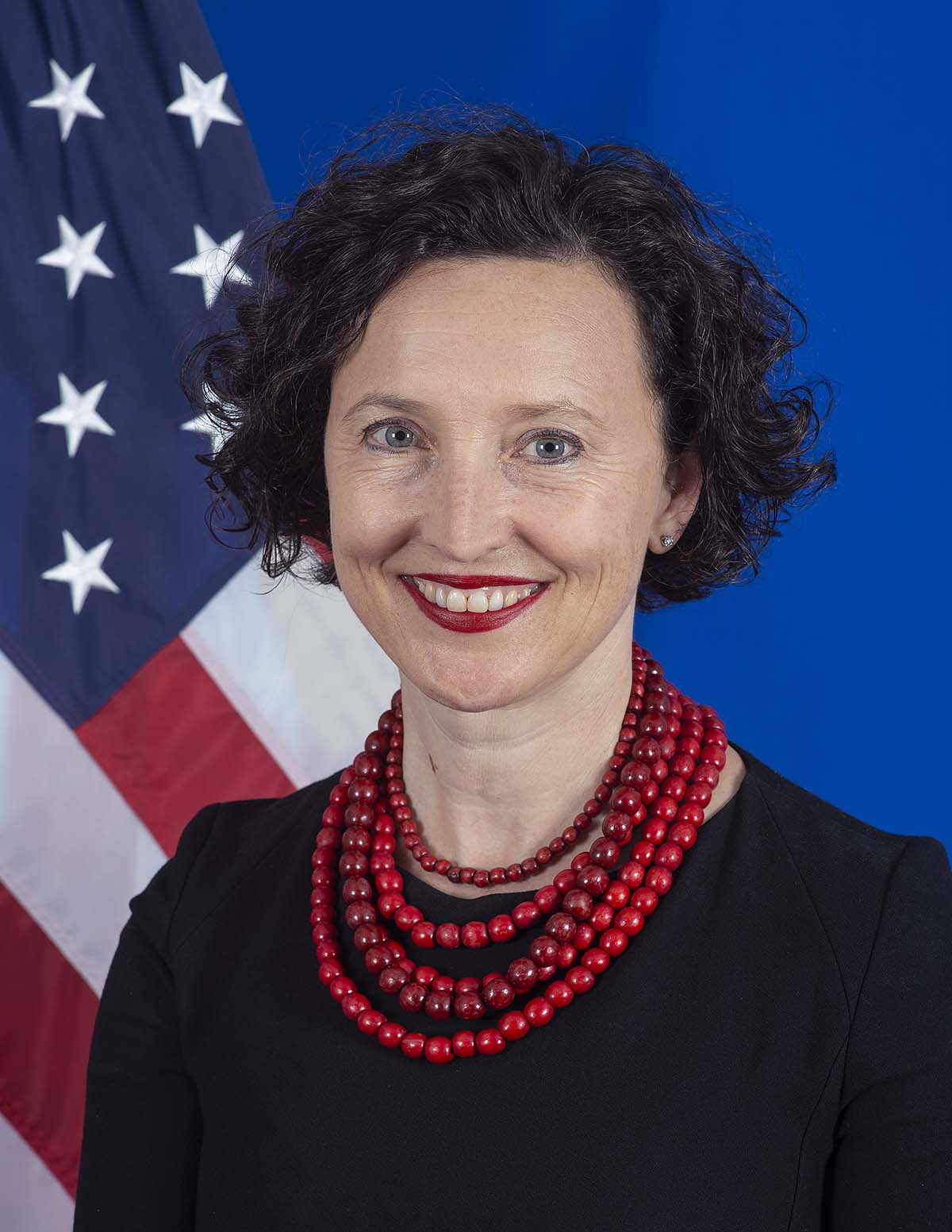
- Horst in 2022

United States Chargé d'affaires ad interim to Estonia
- In office July 29, 2018 – August 2, 2019
- President: Donald Trump
- Preceded by: James D. Melville Jr.
- Succeeded by: Brian R. Roraff

Personal details
- Spouse: Jason P. Gresh

Elizabeth Kathryn Horst is an American diplomat who served as the United States' Chargé d'affaires ad interim to Estonia from 2018 to 2019, and was unsuccessfully nominated to be the United States Ambassador to Sri Lanka.

== Early life and education ==
Elizabeth Horst graduated with a Bachelor of Arts in history and German from the University of Kansas, and with a Master of Arts in modern German history from the University of North Carolina at Chapel Hill. She served as a volunteer for the Peace Corps in Niger.

== Career ==
Horst was Minister Counselor for Public Diplomacy for Mission Germany at the U.S. Embassy Berlin.

Horst served as the Deputy Economic Counselor in Kyiv, Ukraine. She led the interagency task forces of the United States' embassy in Ukraine during the annexation of Crimea by Russia and the 2014 Ukrainian revolution.

James D. Melville Jr. as the United States' Chargé d'affaires ad interim to Estonia by Horst on July 29, 2018. She served until her replacement by Brian R. Roraff on August 2, 2019.

Imran Khan claimed that Donald Lu was responsible for the vote of no confidence that removed him as Prime Minister of Pakistan in April 2022. In 2023, Horst stated that the accusations against Lu was false.

In February 2024, President Joe Biden nominated Horst to serve as ambassador to Sri Lanka. The Senate Foreign Relations Committee held hearings on the Horst nomination to serve as ambassador to Sri Lanka on May 9. The nomination was not confirmed and was returned to the president in January 2025 without confirmation. She was made the U.S. chargé d'affaires to Pakistan on July 24, 2025.

== Personal life ==
Horst married Jason P. Gresh. She can speak German, Russian, French and Hausa.
