= Roman Pipko =

American lawyer and diplomat (born 1960)

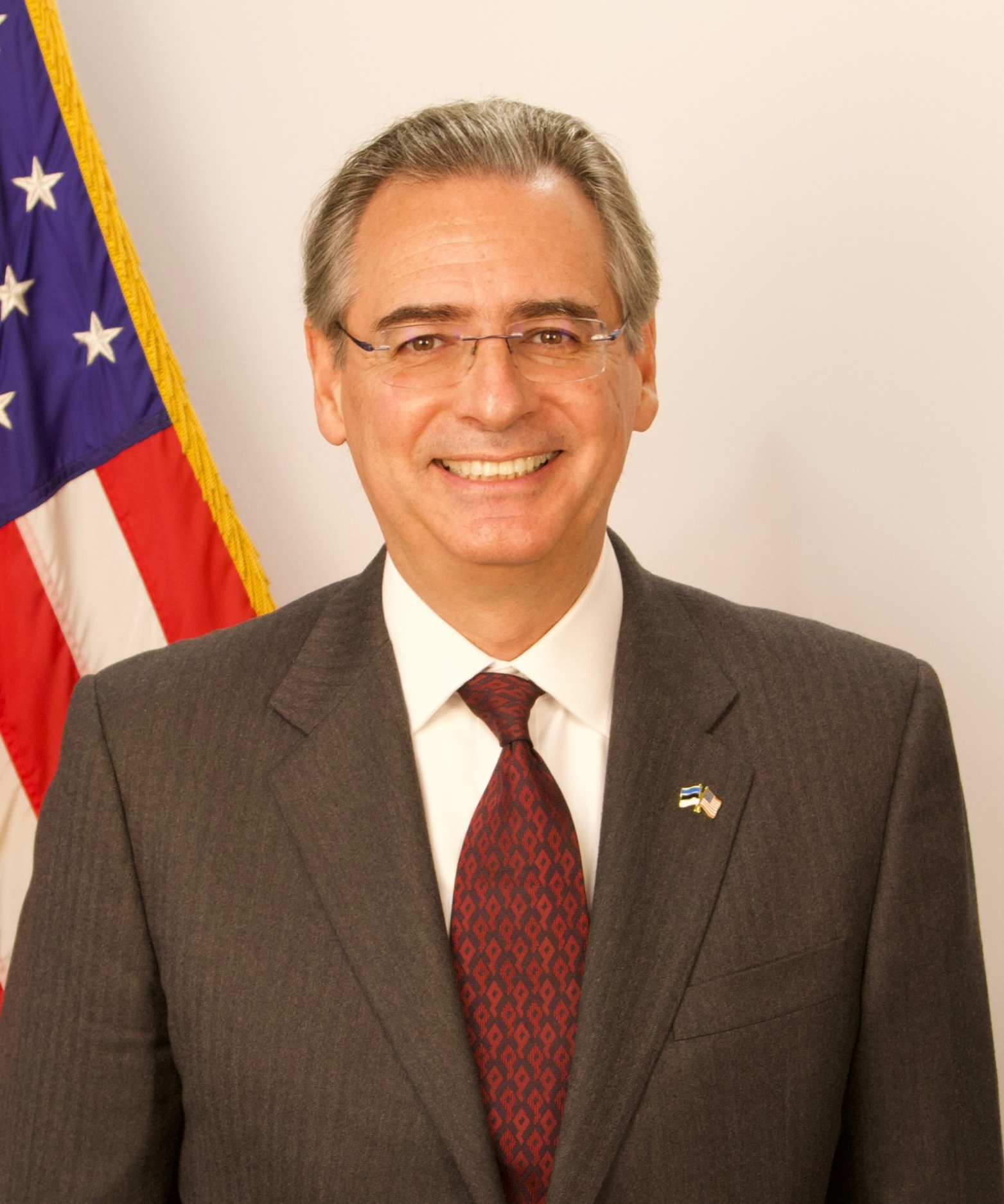

16th United States Ambassador to Estonia
- Incumbent
- Assumed office November 26, 2025
- President: Donald Trump
- Preceded by: George P. Kent

Personal details
- Born: July 10, 1960 (age 66) Tallinn, Estonian Soviet Socialist Republic, USSR
- Relatives: Elizabeth Pipko (daughter); Marc Klionsky (father-in-law)
- Education: Columbia University (BA); Yale University (JD)

Roman Pipko (born July 10, 1960) is an American lawyer and the United States ambassador to Estonia. He was nominated by President Donald Trump, and confirmed by the US Senate to the position on October 7, 2025.

== Early life and education ==
Roman Pipko was born in Tallinn, Estonia, in 1960, during the Soviet occupation of the country, to Russian-Jewish immigrant parents. His parents were lawyers who had been sent by the Soviet Union authorities from Leningrad (now Saint Petersburg, Russia) to occupied Estonia immediately after they had graduated from the Leningrad University law school.

At an early age, his mother enrolled him in an Estonian-language preschool against his father's wishes. He attended the Faculty of Law at the University of Tartu in Estonia. He was not completely fluent in Estonian at the time.

In 1981, his mother left her husband, a member of the Soviet Communist Party, with their children to escape communism and start a better life for her family in the United States. Despite the strict Soviet laws restricting emigration, Jews were sometimes allowed to emigrate.

After immigrating to the United States in 1981, Roman Pipko graduated from Columbia University in the City of New York, and from Yale Law School in 1986.

== Career ==
After immigrating to the US, Pipko worked at the Harriman Institute at Columbia University. He practiced law at Paul, Weiss, Rifkind, Wharton & Garrison, where he was a specialist in Russian law. He represented America as a senior counsel the European Bank for Reconstruction and Development and was senior managing director of the Russian American Enterprise Fund. He has been involved in projects for the Export Import Bank.

Pipko visited Estonia as a legal advisor to US investors including Ronald Lauder in 1991, where he proved his fluency in Estonian and Russian. In 2009, he was the majority partner of Remi International which was part of a consortium of investors (including Ronald Lauder and others) who made an unsuccessful bid to purchase and renovate the Linnahall, a large multi-purpose venue in central Tallinn, Estonia. The project was to include a conference center, concert hall, casino center, and hotel at the site. Although an agreement was signed, it was canceled because the city and the company could not agree on the project's ownership structure. The site continues to be abandoned. He also participated in failed negotiations for an American consortium to renovate a cement plant in Kunda, Estonia.

He was an executive and special counsel at Leon Tempelsman and Son.

In 2024, he was appointed by President-elect Donald Trump to be the United States ambassador to Estonia. He was confirmed by the U.S. Senate on October 7, 2025. He presented his credentials to president Alar Karis on November 26, 2025.

== Philanthropy ==
Pipko is president of the board of trustees of the Park East Day School.

== Family ==
Model and political operative Elizabeth Pipko is his daughter. He is married to Elena Klionsky, a concert pianist and daughter of Marc Klionsky.

Albeit Pipko was able to immigrate to the United States in 1981, he and his family have been members of the Park East Synagogue already since 1974.

Diplomatic posts
Preceded by George P. Kent	United States Ambassador to Estonia; 2025–present	Incumbent
