= Jeffrey D. Levine =

American diplomat (born 1955)

Jeffrey Levine
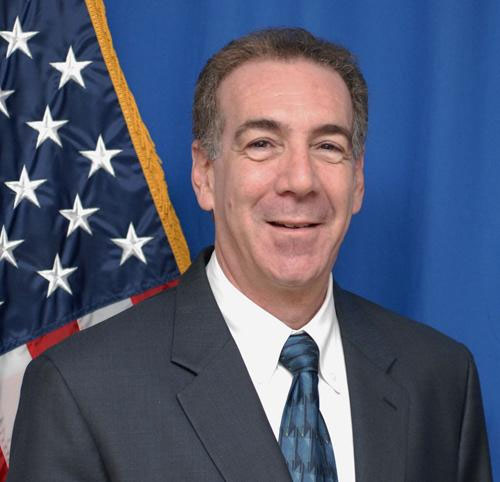

United States Ambassador to Estonia
- In office September 17, 2012 – September 27, 2015
- President: Barack Obama
- Preceded by: Michael Polt
- Succeeded by: James D. Melville Jr.

Personal details
- Born: 1955 (age 70–71)
- Spouse: Janie Keeler
- Children: Nick
- Education: California State Polytechnic University, Humboldt; National Defense University

Jeffrey D. Levine (born 1955) was nominated by U.S. President Barack Obama to be the United States Ambassador to Estonia on February 17, 2012 and was confirmed by the United States Senate on March 29, 2012. He presented his credentials to President of Estonia Toomas Hendrik Ilves on September 17, 2012. He left his post in 2015.

== Early life and education ==
Growing up in the San Francisco Bay Area, he holds a bachelor's degree in journalism from California State University, Humboldt and a master's degree in Resource Strategy from the National Defense University in Washington D.C.

== Career ==
Before joining the Department of State, Jeff Levine worked as a newspaper reporter for seven years and was a founding staff member of USA Today, one of the largest newspapers in the United States.

=== Public service ===
Levine joined the Foreign Service in 1985.

At the United States Department of State, he served in the Operations Center as desk officer for Hungary and as a special assistant to the Under Secretary for Management.

He served as Deputy Chief of Mission/Chargé d'Affaires at the U.S. Embassy in Budapest, Hungary from 2007 to 2010.

In addition to his assignment in Hungary, he served as Deputy Chief of Mission in Sofia, Bulgaria and has also been posted to Brasilia, Brazil; Nicosia, Cyprus; Alexandria, Egypt; Kuala Lumpur, Malaysia and Lima, Peru.

Levine is a member of the Senior Foreign Service with the rank of Minister Counselor. At the time of his nomination, he had been the State Department's director of Recruitment, Examination and Employment since September 2010.

Levine has received numerous Department of State awards as well as the Golden Laurel Medal, presented by the Government of Bulgaria.

== Personal life ==
Jeff Levine is married to Janie L. Keeler and has a son, Nick.

Levine has studied Spanish, Portuguese, Bulgarian and Hungarian and is currently taking Estonian lessons.

Diplomatic posts
Preceded by Michael Polt	United States Ambassador to Estonia; 2012–2015	Succeeded by James D. Melville Jr.
