= Lawrence Palmer Taylor =

American diplomat (born 1940)

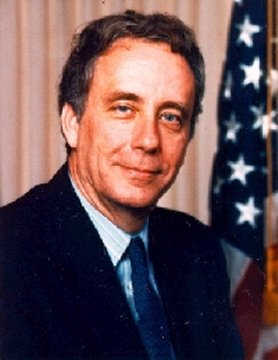

United States Ambassador to Estonia
- In office July 1995 – October 1, 1998
- Preceded by: Robert C. Frasure
- Succeeded by: Melissa F. Wells

Personal details
- Born: April 18, 1940 (age 86) Cleveland, Ohio, U.S.

Lawrence Palmer Taylor (born April 18, 1940) was sworn in as the second U.S. Ambassador to Estonia in July 1995 and took up his posting in Tallinn in August 1995.

== Early life and career ==
Ambassador Taylor was born in Cleveland, Ohio, on April 18, 1940.

Prior to his ambassadorship, he had served since 1992 as Director of the Foreign Service Institute/National Foreign Affairs Training Center at its new campus in Arlington, Virginia.

Ambassador Taylor joined the Foreign Service in 1969 and was posted as vice consul in Santo Domingo. He then served as staff assistant in the Bureau of Inter-American Affairs from 1971–1972, becoming consul in Zagreb, Yugoslavia in 1973. Moving to the embassy in Belgrade, he served there for three years as economic officer. In 1977 he was stationed in Jakarta, Indonesia as energy attaché, moving to the embassy in Ottawa as economic officer from 1980–1984. He then served as economic counselor in London until 1989, returning for a second tour in Ottawa as economic minister from 1989–1992.

Ambassador Taylor graduated from Ohio University and received a master's degree from American University and another from Harvard in addition to spending a year at the National Defense University at Fort McNair in Washington, D.C. His foreign languages are Spanish, Serbo-Croatian, and Slovenian. He was awarded the State Department's Distinguished Honor Award in 1995 and holds two Superior Honor Awards and three senior performance pay awards.

== Personal life ==
Ambassador Taylor is married to Lynda Gorham Taylor and has two daughters and one son. He lives in Gettysburg, Pennsylvania.

Diplomatic posts
Preceded by Robert C. Frasure	United States Ambassador to Estonia; 1995–1998	Succeeded by Melissa F. Wells
