= Maryland Estonia Exchange Council =

Charitable organization based in Maryland, USA

The Maryland Estonia Exchange Council, Inc., also known as MEEC, is a charitable tax exempt corporation to advance the friendship of the State of Maryland and Estonia by providing opportunities for partnerships that enhance cultural exchanges and strengthen political, economic, medical, educational, and security links.

The Maryland Estonia Exchange Council, Inc., is a charitable tax exempt corporation under the Internal Revenue Code, section 501 (c)(3).

== Purpose ==
The purpose of Maryland Estonia Exchange Council, Inc. is to establish and coordinate agreements of international cooperation between the towns, cities, counties and governments of Estonia and the State of Maryland. These agreements allow specific initiatives for mutual benefit to businesses, cultural exchanges, educational programs, civic organizations, security departments and healthcare institutions.

== History ==
The special relationship between Estonia and Maryland started in the early 1990s as part of the NATO Partnership for Peace Program at the end of the Cold War. The Maryland National Guard was linked to the Estonian Defence League (Kaitseliit) as part of a State Partnership Program. Since 2003 Maryland Estonia Exchange Council, Inc. has coordinated the non-military links between Estonia and Maryland. In 2006 and 2009 official agreements were signed formalizing civilian links between Estonia and the State of Maryland. In 2009, the officers of Maryland Estonia Exchange Council, Inc. became members of the MD Secretary of State's Sister State Advisory Board.

== Recent activities ==
The Estonian community of Narva and American community of Bel Air are trying to build cultural and economic ties. The people of both communities and its Bel Air - Narva Sister City Partnership Committee have been working very actively during the past three years to cement their sister city relationship. As one of the Committee members put it, the partnership is not just between the two municipal governments but on "multiple levels".

The most recent event was the visit of the mayor of Narva Tarmo Tammiste and the deputy mayor Vjatseslav Konovalov in Bel Air from May 21 to 24, 2017. The Estonian officials visited the town of Bel Air and Harford County, as well as Annapolis and Washington, D.C.

One of the most important evenings during their four-day visit took place on Tuesday, May 23, when a panel discussion entitled 'Living on the Russian Border' gathered about 75 people. The panelists that participated in the open discussion that was organised in Harford Community College (HCC), were Karl Altau, Joint Baltic American National Committee Managing Director, Kristjan Kuurme, secretary of political affairs for the Estonian Embassy, Vjatseslav Konovalov, Narva City Deputy Mayor, and Tarmo Tammiste, Narva Mayor. The challenges and opportunities in the Narva region were discussed. The local people had the opportunity to ask questions about Estonia, its relationship with Russia, Narva's population and others matters. It was a very open, robust discussion that lasted about two hours.

The next cooperation initiative is a project, the aim of which is to educate high school students in Narva about treating and preventing the spread of HIV, the virus that causes AIDS. Six HCC nursing students and three advisers will go to Narva in late November and early December 2017. The organisers plan to leave the curriculum that was developed by the American students at HCC, with the Narva students so they can continue teaching their fellow youths, plus bring lessons learned back to the U.S. to educate youths in Harford County about sexually transmitted diseases.

The plan for the future includes an Estonian art exhibition that will be displayed in the Liriodendron Mansion in the town of Bel Air in the summer of 2018. The cost of shipping the art to Bel Air is estimated at $15,000, but the good news is that the display could draw people from Baltimore, Washington, D.C., and Philadelphia.

== Cooperation initiatives ==
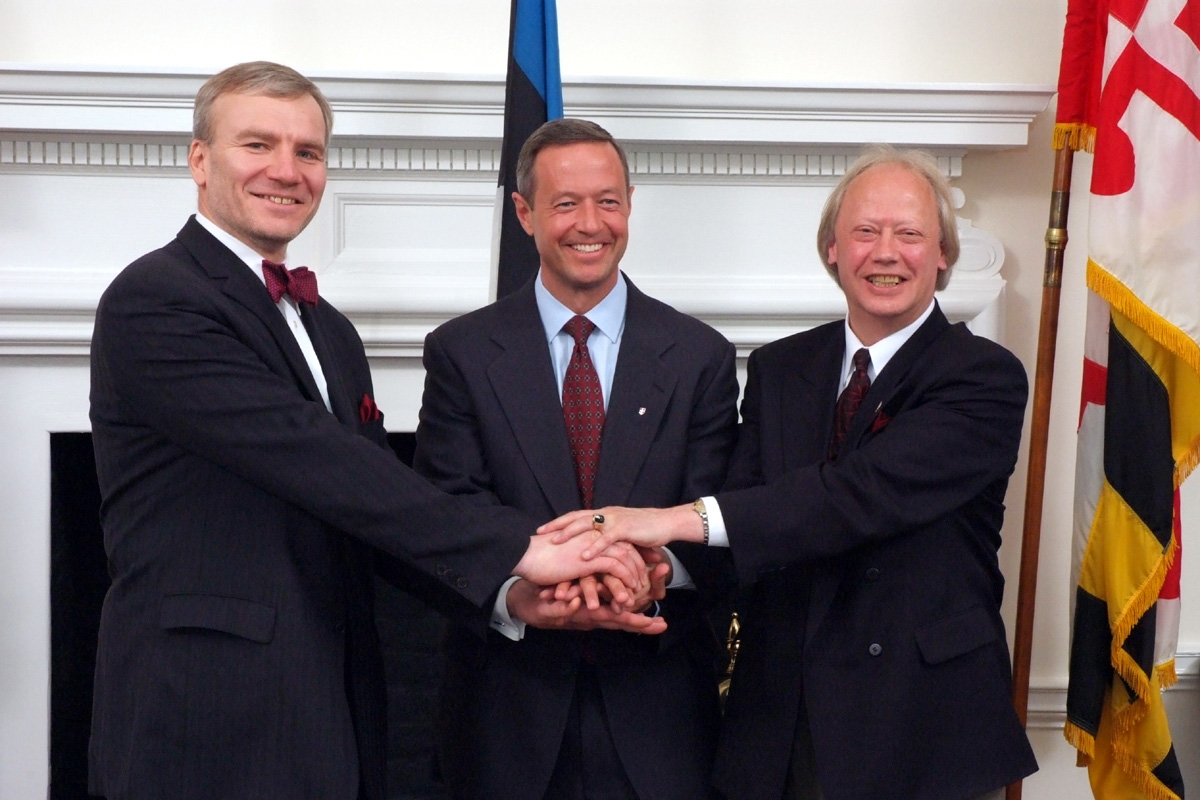
In 2009, Signing of the Sister State Agreement between Maryland and Harju County, Estonia. May 18, 2009

- In November 2015, Memorandum of Understanding between the Maryland Military Department and the Estonian War Museum was signed to demonstrate the Maryland Military Department's commitment to their State Partner and furthering the mutual goal of promoting their military history.
- In 2014, Bel Air signed agreement with first sister city - Narva, Estonia. The partnership can offer cultural, educational, and business exchanges.
- In 2012 a memorandum of understanding for a new academic program with Salisbury University (SU) and Tallinn University of Technology (TUT) was signed. The collaboration, which also involves the University of Tartu (UT), will allow SU students who are pursuing B.S. degrees in computer science, mathematics or information systems to complete their senior year in the newly created Salisbury Abroad: Cybersecurity Program in Estonia. After graduation, they may seamlessly continue on to earn an M.S. degree in cybersecurity or software engineering at TUT or UT.
- In June 2013 Cumberland and Viljandi agreed to mutually explore opportunities to raise cross-cultural awareness and seek beneficial areas of cooperation. In June 2014, the City of Cumberland Maryland hosted a reception to celebrate their one-year partnership with the Estonian city of Viljandi. To mark the occasion, an exhibit entitled "The Undiscovered World. The Secret of Lacebird, by Estonian artist Pusa (Piret Bergmann), was displayed at Cumberland's City Hall.

== Maryland - Estonia Sister Cities ==
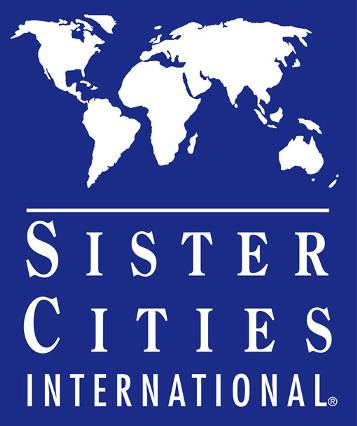
Sister Cities International logo

- Annapolis - Tallinn
- Salisbury - Tartu
- Cumberland - Viljandi
- Bel Air - Narva
- Ocean City - Pärnu
- Charles County - Jõgeva County
- Oakland - Valga
- Westminster - Paide

In addition, there are active relationships and exchanges between: Salisbury University - University of Tartu, and Tallinn Technical University.

== See also ==
- Maryland–Estonia National Guard Partnership
