= Test Pilot (film) =

1938 American film directed by Victor Fleming

- Theatrical release poster
- Directed by: Victor Fleming
- Written by: Frank Wead
- Screenplay by: Waldemar Young; Vincent Lawrence; Howard Hawks; John Lee Mahin
- Produced by: Louis D. Lighton
- Starring: Clark Gable; Myrna Loy; Spencer Tracy
- Cinematography: Ray June
- Edited by: Tom Held
- Music by: Franz Waxman
- Production company: Metro-Goldwyn-Mayer
- Distributed by: Loew's Inc.
- Release dates: April 15, 1938 (New York City and Los Angeles); April 22, 1938 (U.S.)
- Running time: 118 minutes
- Country: United States
- Language: English
- Budget: $1.7 million
- Box office: $3.9 million

Test Pilot is a 1938 American drama film directed by Victor Fleming, starring Clark Gable, Myrna Loy and Spencer Tracy, and featuring Lionel Barrymore. The Oscar-nominated film tells the story of a daredevil test pilot (Gable), his wife (Loy), and his best friend (Tracy).

Test Pilot was written by Howard Hawks, Vincent Lawrence, John Lee Mahin, Frank Wead, and Waldemar Young. The screenplay was largely based on an original story by former naval aviator Wead.

== Plot ==
Reckless test pilot Jim Lane is forced to land on a Kansas farm in his aircraft, the "Drake Bullet", where he meets Ann "Thursday" Barton. They spend the day together and fall in love. Once Jim's best friend and mechanic, Gunner Morris, arrives, Jim ignores Ann. To spur him, she gets engaged to her sweetheart. Jim leaves in the morning, but soon comes back for her. They quickly get married.

Jim loses his job at Drake when he clashes with the owner. He gets a job with another outfit, flying a very experimental aircraft. Ann soon finds out how dangerous her husband's occupation is, but she promises Gunner that she will stick to her man. Jim wins the race, but Benson, the man Drake sends in Jim's place, dies, leaving a wife and three children behind.

Jim tries to reform his ways and begins by taking a job testing aircraft, even conducting dangerous flights as he wants to give Ann a real home. Gunner remains true to his friend. (Note: Gunner has a superstitious preflight ritual of putting a piece of chewing gum on the aircraft. In The Right Stuff (1983), Jack Ridley, Chuck Yeager's best friend and engineer on his test missions, also had given him a stick of Beemans chewing gum before Yeager's test flights. This allusion to a chewing gum ritual was later included in The Rocketeer (1991).)

One day, Gunner accompanies Jim on a test flight of a new bomber (a Y1B-17, a pre-production Boeing B-17 Flying Fortress prototype). Upon reaching 30,000 feet (9,100 m; 9.1 km), the bomber goes into a spin and sandbags (substituting for the weight of bombs) break loose, pinning Gunner. Unwilling to bail out without his buddy, Jim manages to crash land, and pulls a badly injured Gunner out of the wreckage right before it burst into flames, but it is too late for Gunner. When Jim realizes the toll his job has taken on his wife, he gives it up and joins the United States Army Air Corps.

== Cast ==
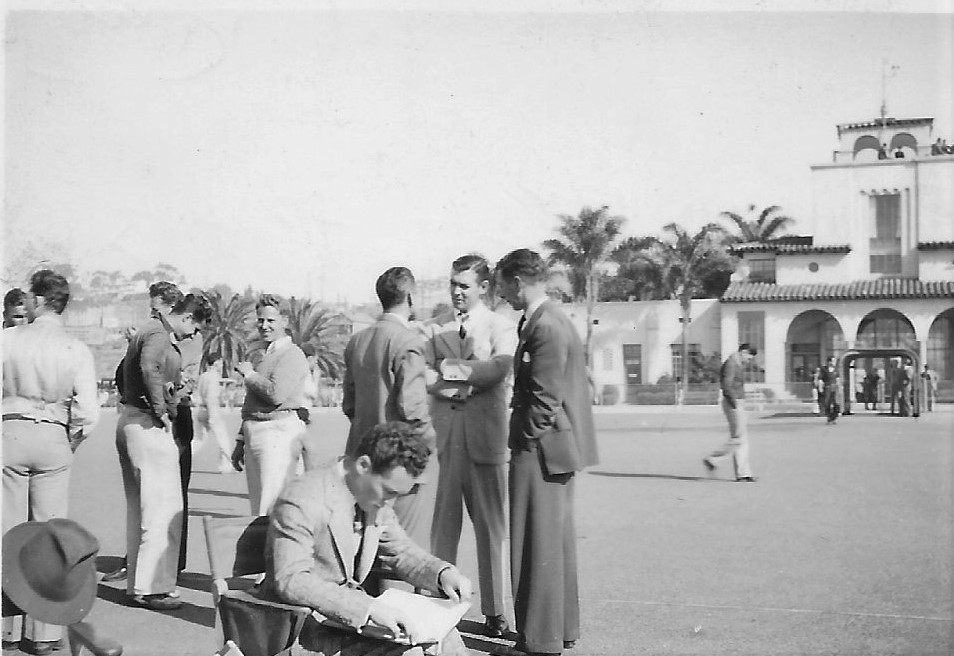
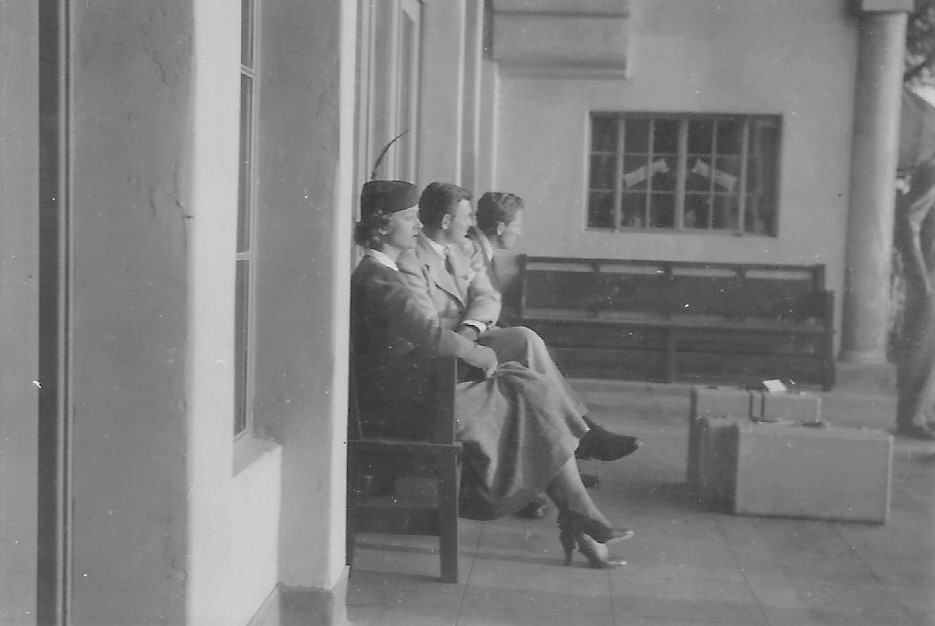
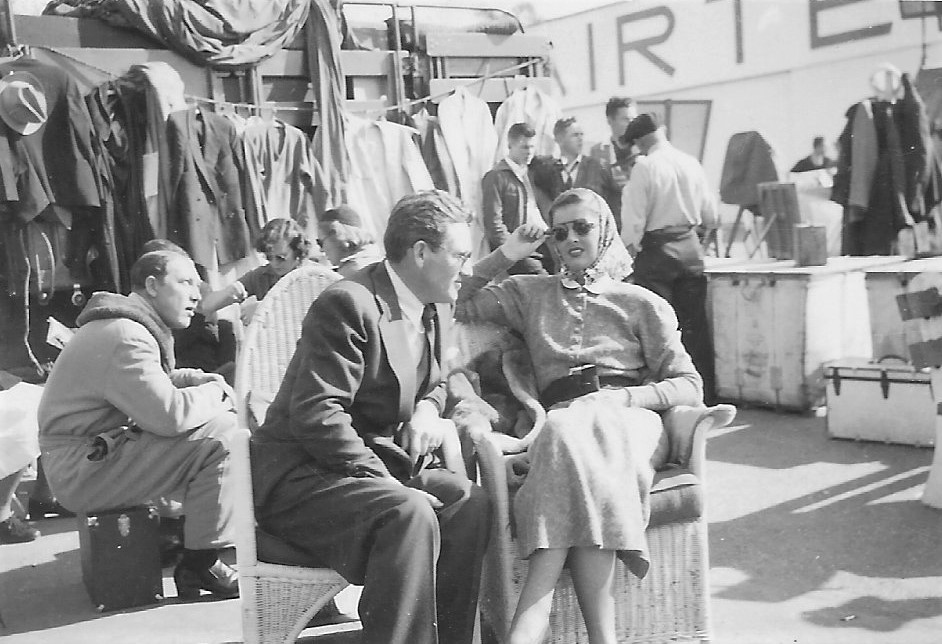
Filming on location at Lindbergh Field with Gable, Loy, and Tracy

As appearing in Test Pilot (main roles and screen credits identified):

- Clark Gable as Jim Lane
- Myrna Loy as Ann Barton
- Spencer Tracy as Gunner Morris
- Lionel Barrymore as Drake
- Samuel S. Hinds as General Ross
- Marjorie Main as Landlady
- Ted Pearson as Joe
- Gloria Holden as Mrs. Benson
- Louis Jean Heydt as Benson
- Virginia Grey as Sarah
- Priscilla Lawson as Mable
- Arthur Aylesworth as Mr. Frank Barton
- Claudia Coleman as Mrs. Barton
- Fay Holden as Lingerie Saleslady (uncredited)
- Roger Converse as Advertising Man (uncredited)
- Gregory Gaye as Grant (uncredited)
- Lester Dorr as Pilot (uncredited)

== Production ==
Test Pilot brought together three of the most bankable Hollywood stars of the period, but while Loy and Gable became friends, an uneasy relationship existed between Tracy and Gable. At the climax of a lengthy take where he was cradling his comrade's head in his arms, Gable was reported to have said, "Die, goddamn it, Spence! I wish to Christ you would!" and dropped Tracy's head with a thud.

Principal photography took place from December 1, 1937, to February 18, 1938, at MGM studios and on location at Van Nuys, California, Lindbergh Field (San Diego), March Field, California, and at the Cleveland National Air Races, with retakes on March 30 to early April 1938. Test Pilot utilized authentic United States Army Air Corps airfield settings and was able to obtain rights to film using Boeing's new Y1B-17, which was destined to become the progenitor of the wartime B-17 bomber series. The Drake Bullet was actually the SEV-S2 NR70Y, a modified civilian racer version of the U.S. Army Air Corps P-35. The other test aircraft that is flown to its top diving speed is a Northrop A-17 attack bomber. (Note: In the film, the A-17 sheds a wing.) Renowned movie stunt pilot Paul Mantz served as the second unit director in charge of the flying sequences. Although uncredited, real-life test pilot Sammy Wroath did the flying sequences.

== Reception ==
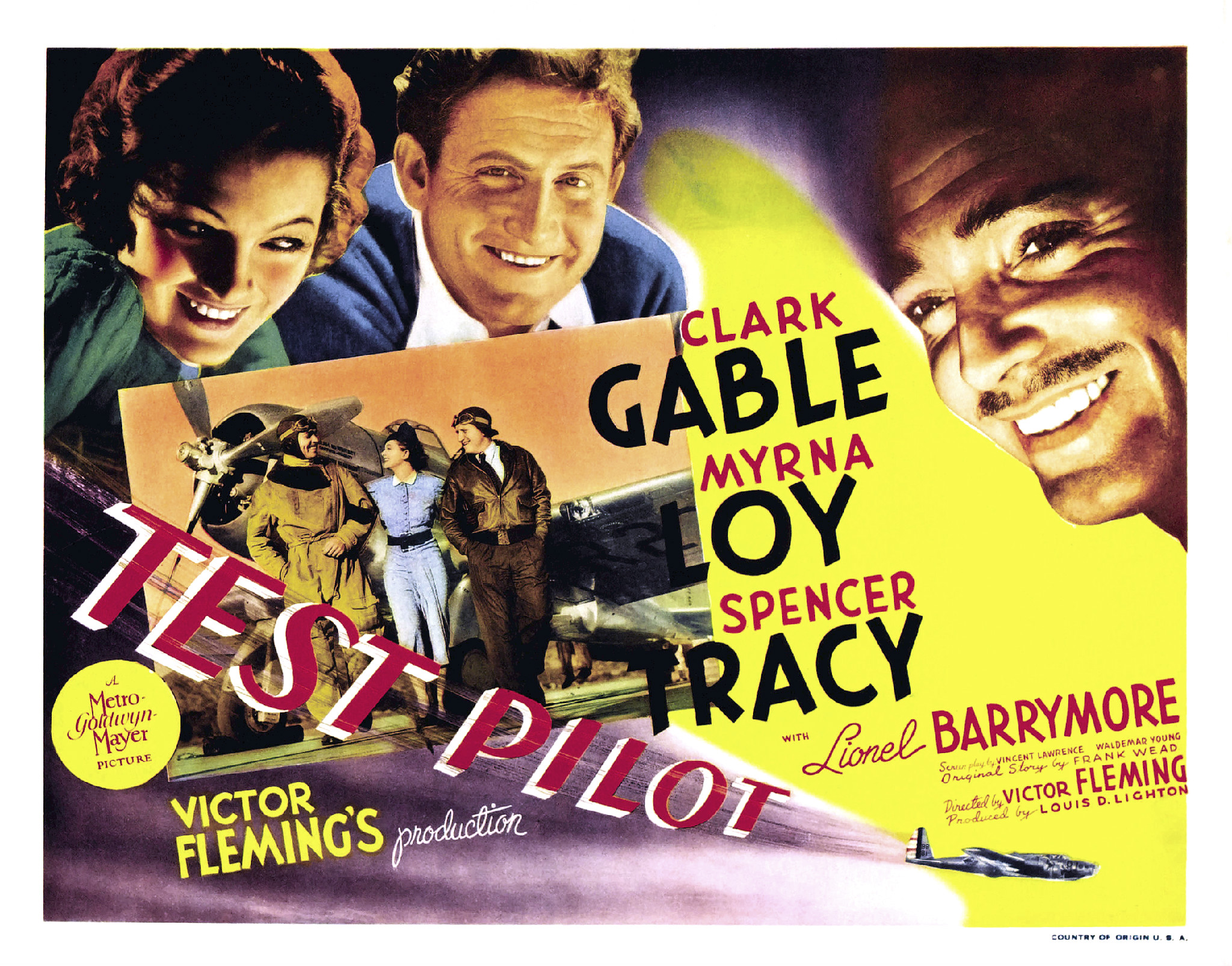
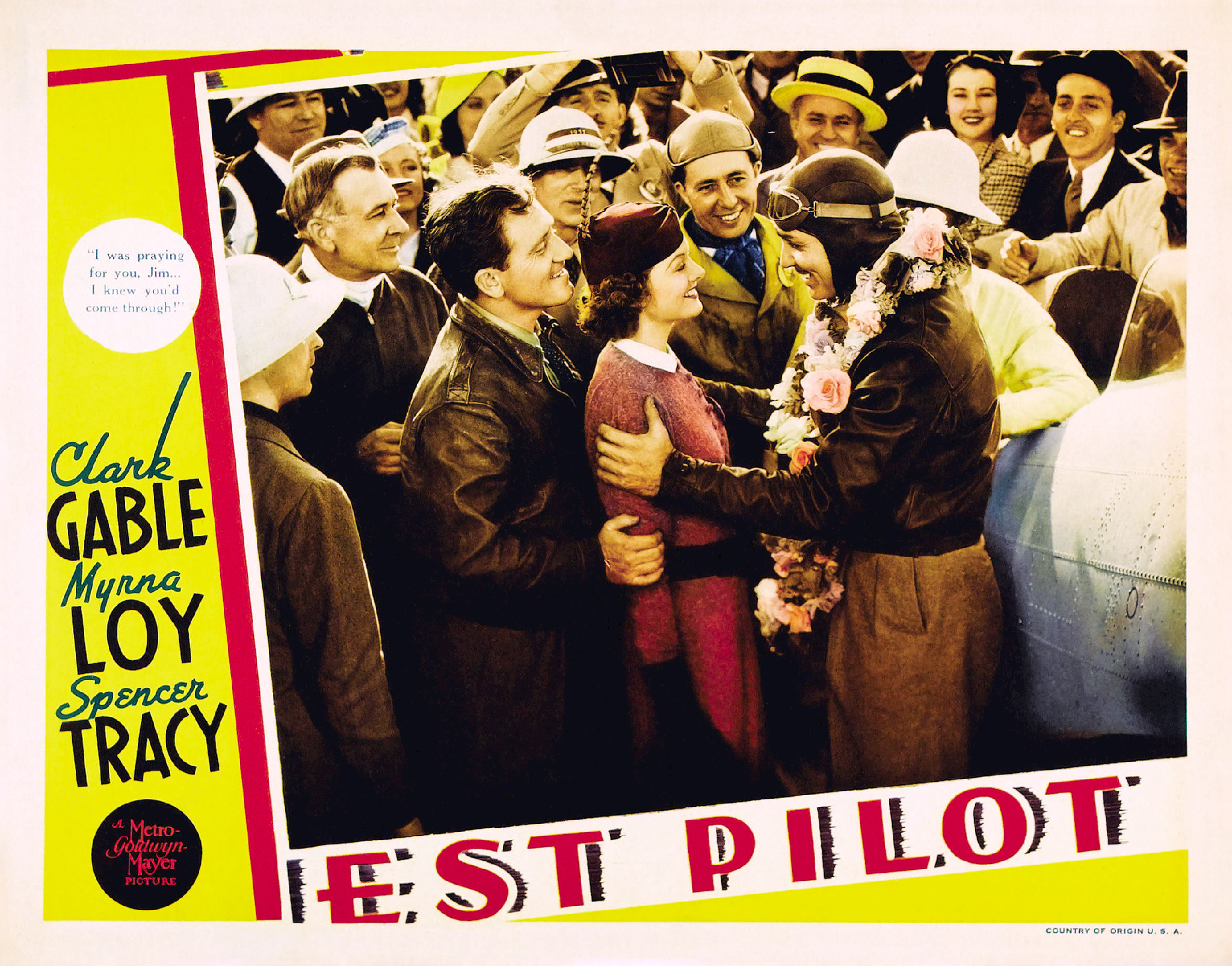
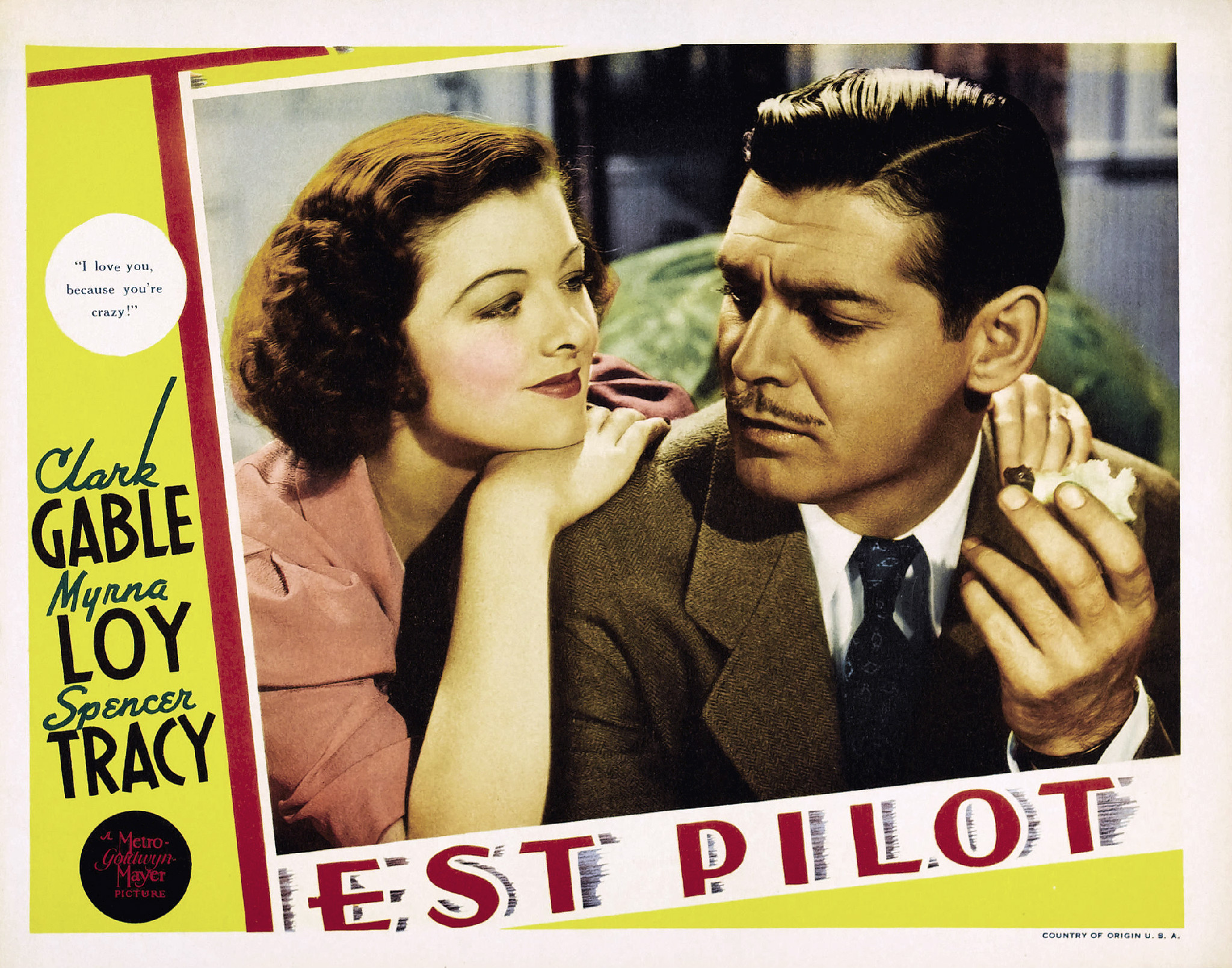
Various lobby card designs

Proving to be an "audience-pleaser" and becoming one of MGM's top money-makers in 1938, Test Pilot also found favor with critics. Frank S. Nugent of The New York Times called it "a bang-up aviation drama ... It is a generous show by any reckoning, long in its running time, star-studded and spectacular, and Victor Fleming, its director, has paced it wisely." Film Daily raved, "Spectacular romance thriller ... It can't miss." Harrison's Reports wrote, "Excellent entertainment ... Other air pictures have been made; but for sheer thrills, this one leads them all because of the realistic way it has been done." John Mosher of The New Yorker wrote that while aviation films with fine flying scenes had already been done, those in this picture were "superior to the average".

Today, it is considered a significant aviation film by historians due to the use of contemporary aircraft. Even at the time of its release, Variety noted that the "story bespeaks authority in detail, obviously explained by the fact that Capt. Frank Wead, who authored the original, has had (a) practical aviation background." Both Loy and Tracy (despite his obvious scene-stealing battles with Gable) later claimed Test Pilot was their favorite film.

=== Box office ===
According to MGM records, Test Pilot earned $2,431,000 in the U.S. and $1,472,000 elsewhere resulting in a profit of $967,000.

== Academy Award nominations ==
Test Pilot was nominated for Best Picture at the 11th Academy Awards, while Wead was nominated for Best Story, and Tom Held for Best Film Editing.

== See also ==
- Lionel Barrymore filmography
