= Aldona Wos =

Polish-American diplomat & politician (born 1955)

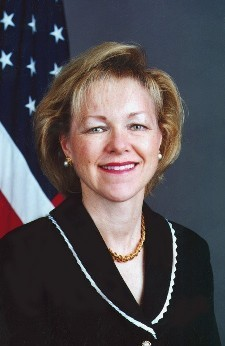

Vice Chair of the President's Commission on White House Fellowships
- In office May 1, 2017 – January 20, 2021
- President: Donald Trump
- Preceded by: Cheryl Dorsey
- Succeeded by: Vacant

North Carolina Secretary of Health and Human Services
- In office January 5, 2013 – August 5, 2015
- Governor: Pat McCrory
- Preceded by: Lanier Cansler
- Succeeded by: Rick Brajer

United States Ambassador to Estonia
- In office September 2, 2004 – December 17, 2007
- President: George W. Bush
- Preceded by: Joseph DeThomas
- Succeeded by: Stanley Davis Phillips

Personal details
- Born: 1955 (age 70–71) Warsaw, Poland
- Party: Republican
- Spouse: Louis DeJoy
- Children: 2
- Education: Marquette University (BS); Medical University of Warsaw (MD)

Aldona Zofia Wos DeJoy (born 1955) is a Polish-American former physician and Republican politician who served in various positions at several government agencies under Presidents George W. Bush and Donald Trump and nonprofit organizations. She was the United States Ambassador to Estonia from 2004 until early December 2006, the fifth since the country regained its independence in 1991. From 2013 until 2015, she was Secretary of the North Carolina Department of Health and Human Services. From 2017 to 2021, Wos served as vice-chairwoman of the President's Commission on White House Fellowships, which is tasked with reviewing candidates for White House fellowships.

She is married to former USPS Postmaster General Louis DeJoy.

== Early life and medical career ==
Wos is the daughter of Wanda and Paul Zenon Wos. Her father was part of the Home Army during the German and Soviet occupation of Poland in World War II. Aldona Wos was born in 1955 in Warsaw, where she lived until the age of six, when her family moved to Long Island, New York.

Wos earned a medical degree from Medical University of Warsaw. She returned to New York to complete her residency and a fellowship with a specialty in lung diseases. Wos practiced medicine in Manhattan for eighteen years.

== Political career ==
In 1997, Wos left her medical practice and moved to Greensboro, North Carolina, with her husband Louis DeJoy, who was CEO of New Breed Logistics Inc. from 1983 to 2014. In North Carolina, she and her husband have organized and hosted fundraisers for a number of national and state-level political campaigns, and have been significant contributors to several Republican candidates. Wos raised nearly $1 million for the campaign to elect Elizabeth Dole to the U.S. Senate in the 2002 elections and served as vice chairwoman of George W. Bush's North Carolina fundraising organization.

In May 2002, Wos was appointed to a seat on the board of directors of the U.S. Holocaust Memorial Council. President Bush re-appointed her to second term on the council beginning in 2004.

In June 2004, President Bush appointed her the U.S. Ambassador to Estonia. She was sworn in on August 13, 2004. As ambassador, she helped organize the state visit of President Bush to Estonia, which took place on 27th and 28 November 2006. For her efforts in facilitating US cooperation with the Estonian police, she was awarded a special police medal, given to her by Raivo Aeg, the head of the Estonian Police. She left her diplomatic post in December 2006.

In March 2007, Polish President Lech Kaczynski awarded Wos the Commander Cross of the Order of Merit of the Republic of Poland.

Wos was part of the second campaign to elect Pat McCrory as Governor of North Carolina. In May 2011, she hosted a luncheon for the Women for Pat McCrory in the lead-up to the former Mayor of Charlotte's announcement as a Republican candidate for the 2012 North Carolina gubernatorial election. She later served as co-chairwoman for the campaign and after McCrory's win, she was a part of his transition team. In June 2012, Wos was appointed to the board of governors of the University of North Carolina by the state's Republican-controlled General Assembly.

=== Secretary of North Carolina Health and Human Services ===
In December 2012, North Carolina Governor-elect Pat McCrory announced that Wos will be a member of his Cabinet as Secretary of the Department of Health and Human Services (DHHS). Wos declined her $128,000 salary and was instead paid a token $1. On January 31, 2013, a performance audit was released, criticizing the previous administration's lack of record keeping concerning various funds, as well as naming other budgetary problems. Wos released her responses to the audit in an appendix, agreeing on all points with the auditor, including the conclusion that DHHS had consistently exceeded budgeted amounts for administrative costs due to lack of oversight by the previous administration.

When speaking to the General Assembly in February 2013, Wos laid out her department priorities as "Medicaid and information technology." In April 2013, Wos announced the governor's plan to overhaul the Medicaid system in North Carolina which she and McCrory criticized as "broken". This early plan would have brought in a few "entities — likely including private companies — to function as insurance companies for Medicaid recipients." These entities would operate state-wide and serve as insurance plans from which Medicaid recipients can choose. The plan faced criticism from healthcare professionals who were concerned that it would permit "out-of-state and for-profit providers to get a major foothold in North Carolina, rather than letting proven in-state and nonprofit providers, such as Community Care of N.C., take the lead". At least one public health expert alleged that the Medicare crisis was contrived in order to justify privatization. Additionally, an investigation in North Carolina Health News alleged that McCrory, Wos and Medicaid head Carol Stickel withheld information that would have shown that North Carolina Medicaid administrative costs were lower than those of most other states, rather than 30% higher as alleged by the McCrory administration. The overhaul plan suffered an additional setback when the person hired to spearhead it, Carol Steckel, resigned in September 2013 to join the private sector. The state chose not to implement the proposed plans.

In July 2013, DHHS went live with its NCTracks system for managing Medicaid billings, a system contracted in 2008 under the previous administration. By October, the system was facing criticism from health care providers that were concerned that the system was not reimbursing them quickly enough. In January 2014, an error in the system caused the private medical information of almost 49,000 children to be mailed to the wrong addresses. Throughout 2013 and early 2014, DHHS worked to resolve glitches with the NCTracks Medicaid billing system. The department announced that the system was working effectively by July 2014. Wos stated that she was disappointed that the state elected not to move forward with her proposal to reform the state's entire Medicaid program. By 2015, DHHS announced that the glitches in NCTracks were resolved, and Wos had "[convinced] the legislature of the need to invest in the state's medical examiner system."

Also in the summer of 2013, DHHS began processing SNAP food stamp applications through its new integrated NC FAST system. Due to various glitches there were almost immediate delays in families receiving food stamps. A number of food stamp recipients were forced to go to food kitchens while their benefits were processed. The delays were very persistent, and on January 24, 2014, the United States Department of Agriculture sent a letter to Wos stating that as of that date, North Carolina had a backlog of 20,243 SNAP cases that had not been processed within the 30 day deadline required by US law. 11,493 of these cases were over 60 days old, 8,002 were over 90 days old, and 5,934 were over 120 days old. 8,963 of these cases were categorized as "hardship" cases, where the processing deadline is 7 days because the applicant has very little income. USDA threatened to withhold funding from DHSS on March 12, 2014, if the agency did not come into compliance. On April 16, 2016, Wos announced, and USDA confirmed, that DHHS had come into compliance with federal timeliness guidelines.

In August 2013, Wos faced criticism for hiring two young former McCrory campaign workers, and giving them large pay raises at a time when McCrory had declared a salary freeze for state employees. 24-year-old Matthew McKillip was named Chief Policy Advisor to Wos, having worked for McCrory's campaign, and having previously served as a research assistant for eleven months at the conservative think tank, the American Enterprise Institute. McKillip received a $22,500 raise in April 2013, bringing his salary to $87,500. DHHS Communications Director Ricky Diaz, also 24 and also a former McCrory campaign worker, received a $23,000 raise in April, bringing his salary to $85,000 per year. Diaz resigned from the department in January 2014.

Wos resigned on August 15, 2015, stating in a press conference that it was "simply time to go home" and spend time with her family. Asked by the press if she would "change any of the decisions that she made over a sometimes rocky tenure," she replied, "not at all." Wos was replaced by Rick Brajer, a former medical technology executive. After being sworn in, Brajer asserted to the press that Wos's resignation was unrelated to the ongoing federal investigation into DHHS. In August 2016, federal officials ended the investigations into employee and consultant contracts "with no finding of criminal wrongdoing".

Although Wos's tenure as secretary earned criticism for issues such as computer glitches, McCrory praised how she "streamlined" the health care delivery systems. McCrory also praised Wos for the state's $130 million Medicaid budget surplus during her tenure, after years of major budget shortfalls. For her service to the state, McCrory awarded Wos with the Order of the Long Leaf Pine.

=== 2015 to present ===
In May 2017, President Donald Trump appointed her his vice-chairwoman of the President's Commission on White House Fellowships. The president uses the commission to interview and recommend candidates for White House fellowships. In June 2019, she was considered for the post of Ambassador to Canada, and Trump announced his intent to nominate her on February 11, 2020. On February 25, 2020, her nomination was sent to the Senate. On July 23, 2020, she testified before the United States Senate Committee on Foreign Relations. On January 3, 2021, her nomination was returned to the President under Rule XXXI, Paragraph 6 of the U.S. Senate.

In February 2022, she was appointed Interim President of the Institute of World Politics following the departure of her predecessor.

== Family and charity work ==
Wos's grandmother and aunts were imprisoned in Ravensbrück concentration camp, while her father and grandfather, Paul Wos Sr., were held in Flossenbürg concentration camp. Her Catholic family helped twelve Jews escape from the Warsaw Ghetto. They were reunited after the Allied Forces liberated the concentration camps. She has spoken publicly about the need to remember Holocaust victims.

Wos and her husband Louis DeJoy have twin children and live in Greensboro, North Carolina, in an Irving Park Neighborhood home, which has been the location of several notable political fundraising events.

Her husband donated $747,000 to Duke University in 2014, funding Blue Devil Tower and the DeJoy Family Club at the football stadium. The same year, their son was accepted to the school and joined the school's tennis team as a walk-on.

Wos has been involved in efforts to raise money for a number of nonprofit organizations and private schools as well. She served on the board of the United Way of Greater Greensboro, and has been involved with the Family Services of the Piedmont, Hospice and Palliative Care of Greensboro, and the Triad Stage Theatre. She was also instrumental in raising the finances for the Greensboro Ballet gala, held in February 2011, to celebrate the 30th anniversary of the ballet company and school once attended by her children. Wos and DeJoy also founded The Louis DeJoy and Aldona Z. Wos Family Foundation which awards several scholarships to students. The foundation also hosts a professional–amateur golf championship as a prelude to the Wyndham Championship.

Diplomatic posts
Preceded by Joseph DeThomas	United States Ambassador to Estonia; 2004–2007	Succeeded by Stanley Davis Phillips
