= Stanley Davis Phillips =

American diplomat and CEO (1942–2022)

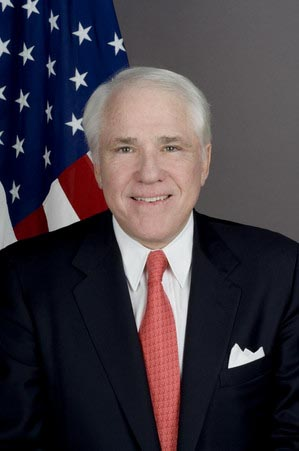

United States Ambassador to Estonia
- In office April 16, 2007 – January 16, 2009
- President: George W. Bush
- Preceded by: Aldona Wos
- Succeeded by: Michael C. Polt

Personal details
- Born: May 11, 1942 High Point, North Carolina, U.S.
- Died: November 20, 2022 (aged 80)
- Relatives: Pierre Yared (son-in-law)
- Education: University of North Carolina at Chapel Hill

Stanley Davis “Dave” Phillips (May 11, 1942 – November 20, 2022) was the chairman and chief executive officer of Phillips Industries, Inc. and was a political appointee as U.S. Ambassador to Estonia from 2007 until 2009.

== Biography ==
Phillips attended Choate Rosemary Hall and the University of North Carolina at Chapel Hill, where he joined the Beta chapter of Delta Kappa Epsilon. Choate awarded him the 2010 Choate Seal Prize.

=== Business career ===
Phillips was the founding chairman of Phillips Factors Corp., a financial services firm which merged with BB&T Corp., founder of Phillips Mills (merged with Culp Inc.) and a founding partner of the Market Square Partnership, which merged with Vornado Realty Trust.
