= Elizabeth Pipko =

American author and model (born 1995)

- Pipko in 2025
- Born: June 26, 1995 (age 31); New York City, New York, U.S.
- Education: Harvard Extension School (ALB); University of Pennsylvania (MS)
- Occupations: Author, model, spokeswoman
- Political party: Republican
- Spouse: Darren Centinello (m. 2018)
- Children: 1
- Relatives: Roman Pipko (father); Marc Klionsky (grandfather)
- Years active: 2012–present
- Modeling information
- Height: 5 ft 7 in (170 cm)
- Hair color: Brown
- Eye color: Brown
- Agency: Front Management; Click Model Management
- Website: Official website

Elizabeth Pipko (born June 26, 1995) is an American author, model, media personality, and political commentator . She was the national spokesperson for the Republican Party.

== Early life and education ==
Elizabeth Pipko was born in New York City on June 26, 1995, to a family that emigrated from the former Soviet Union. She is the granddaughter of Soviet-born American artist Marc Klionsky on her mother's side and her father is Roman Pipko. She was a competitive figure skater until the age of fifteen when an ankle injury took her out of the sport. Pipko is Jewish and attended Rabbi Arthur Schneier's Park East Day School.

Pipko is a cum laude graduate of the Harvard Extension School at Harvard University. She received her Master of Science degree at the University of Pennsylvania in May, 2023.

== Modeling career ==
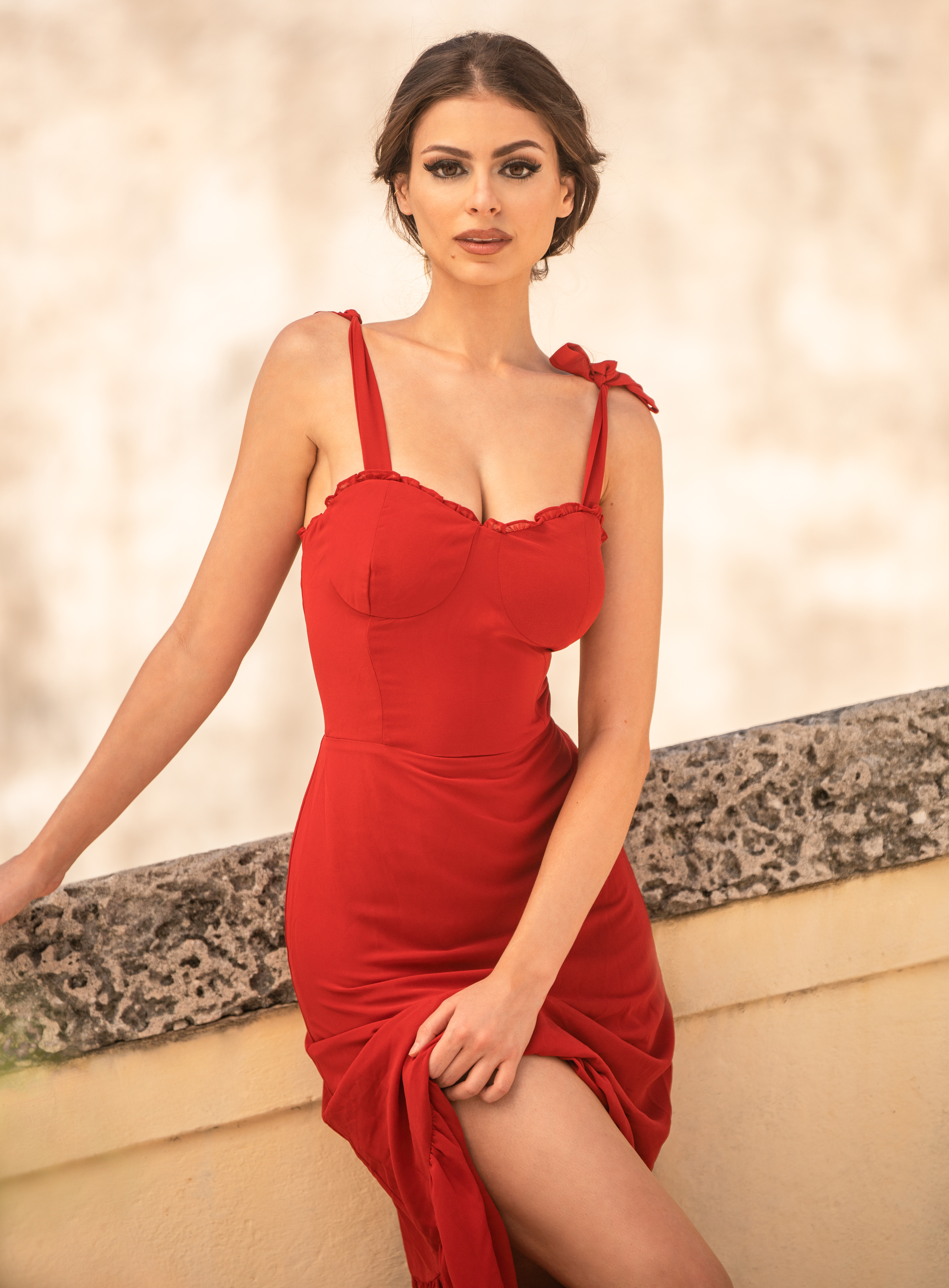
Pipko in 2022

Pipko was signed to Wilhelmina Models at age 17. She has appeared in Maxim, Harper's Bazaar, Grazia, DT, Esquire, Contrast, and L’officiel, and in the early stages of her career she was often compared to Emily Ratajkowski, with many noting their similar appearances. In 2018, she appeared in the "Perfectly Imperfect" campaign for Vizcaya Swimwear, an anti-photoshop campaign promoting positive body image.

Pipko has stated that her political work interfered in her modeling career. In an interview and spread in QP Magazine in 2019 she said “This is about showing young girls that they can do anything they want to do. From modeling to politics, and everything in between.”

In December 2021, Pipko was featured on the cover of Harper's Bazaar Vietnam. In October 2024, Pipko was featured on the cover of L'Officiel Argentina.

== Political career ==
In 2016, Pipko was employed on Donald Trump's 2016 campaign for president as a volunteer services coordinator.

In 2019, Pipko was a spokesperson for The Exodus Movement — originally named Jexodus (an apparent portmanteau of "Jewish" and "Exodus") but quickly renamed — and incorporated it as a tax exempt organization. The Exodus Movement is an initiative of Red Sea Rising, a 501c4 organization.

She told OK! magazine "When I got thrown into the political world, I knew the only way for me to both survive and thrive would be to create something meaningful. So I put my efforts into fighting for the Jewish people and against anti-Semitism."

On fighting injustices in the US, Pipko told Fox News, "It's very easy to find problems going on right now in our society. No one's going to deny that things are upside down. I'm fighting anti-Semitism every single day. I still get swastikas sent to my direct messages once a week. I think when supporting America, in my eyes, it's more patriotic of me to stand against those things because I know America doesn't stand for that," she said.

In February 2022, when asked for her thoughts on the Russian invasion of Ukraine, Pipko told Fox news, "I have heard people ask, 'Why should we care about what is going on in Russia and Ukraine today?' We as Americans know what we stand for, and we know that an attack on democracy anywhere is an attack on democracy everywhere. It's that simple."

In January 2023, Pipko launched the Lest People Forget project, a crypto-technology global Holocaust remembrance platform to fight anti-Semitism and Holocaust denial inspired by remarks made by Kanye West. She stated that she imagines the site as an interactive virtual Holocaust museum, and a place where students who do not live near a Holocaust museum can explore and learn. The site offers the ability for anyone to become involved in preserving the materials of the Holocaust.

She told The Algemeiner that the Lest People Forget project aims to modernize and "decentralize" education about the Holocaust. That same year, Pipko was named on the Algemeiner Journal's annual J100 list, honoring the top 100 people positively influencing Jewish life.

Pipko has written opinion pieces on the topic of antisemitism for Fox News, the Jewish Voice, and Newsweek.

Pipko regularly appears across television news programs to speak on topics from pop culture to politics both in America and internationally.

In May 2024, Pipko was named national spokeswoman for the Republican National Committee.

In September 2025, Pipko was selected as one of the Top 50 Most Influential Jews of 2025 by the Jerusalem Post.

In March 2026, Pipko was appointed to the United States Holocaust Memorial Council by President Trump.

== Author ==
Pipko self-published through Archway Publishing two books of poetry: Sweet Sixteen (2013, ISBN 9781480800731) and About You (2018, ISBN 1480863106).

In 2020, Pipko's book Finding My Place: Making My Parents' American Dream Come True (2020, ISBN 164293559X) was released through Post Hill Press.

== Personal life ==
On December 26, 2018, Pipko married Darren Centinello in West Palm Beach, Florida at the Mar-A-Lago Club.

Pipko welcomed her first child, a girl, with husband Darren Centinello in February 2026.
