= List of ambassadors of the United States to Estonia =

Ambassador of the United States to Estonia
- Seal of the United States Department of State

- Flag of a United States ambassador

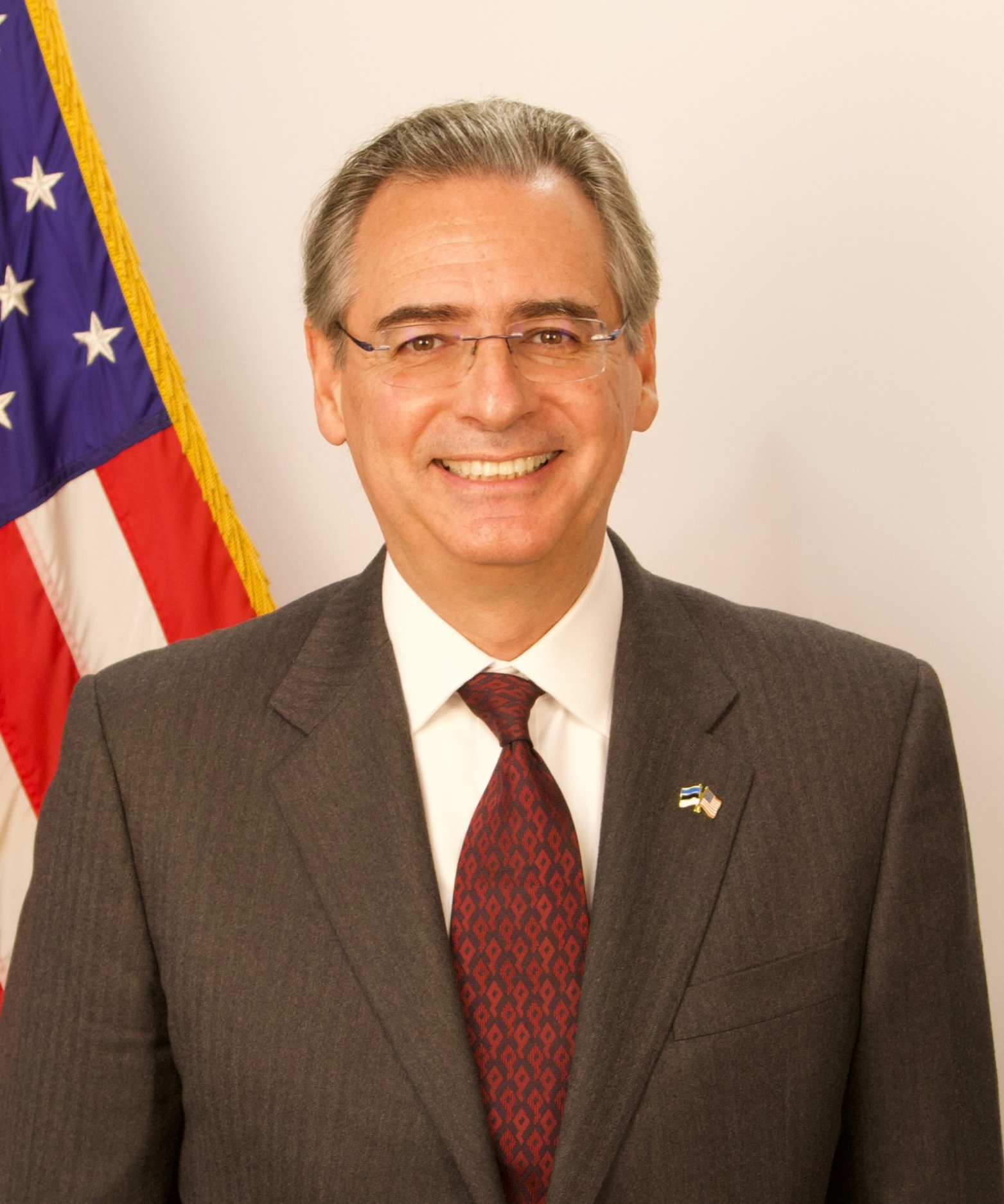
- Incumbent; Roman Pipko since November 26, 2025
- Nominator: The president of the United States
- Appointer: The president with Senate advice and consent
- Inaugural holder: Frederick W.B. Coleman as Envoy Extraordinary and Minister Plenipotentiary
- Formation: September 20, 1922
- Website: U.S. Embassy – Tallinn

This is a list of ambassadors of the United States to Estonia.

The United States has maintained continuous official diplomatic relations with Estonia (as well as Latvia and Lithuania) since 1922, when one ambassador, resident in Riga, Latvia, was appointed to all three nations. Relations with the three nations were broken after the Soviet invasion of the republics in 1940 at the beginning of World War II. The United States never recognized the legitimacy of the Soviet occupation of the three Baltic nations, nor the legitimacy of the governments of those states under Soviet occupation. Hence, diplomatic relations were not resumed until 1991 after the collapse of the Soviet Union.

The U.S. Embassy in Estonia is located in Tallinn.

== Ambassadors ==
Name	Title	Appointed	Presented credentials	Terminated mission	Notes
Frederick W. B. Coleman – Political appointee	Envoy Extraordinary and Minister Plenipotentiary	September 20, 1922	November 20, 1922	Left Riga October 20, 1931	During Coleman’s tenure as nonresident Minister, the Legation in Tallinn was established on June 30, 1930 with Harry E. Carlson as Chargé d'Affaires ad interim.
Robert Peet Skinner – Career FSO	Envoy Extraordinary and Minister Plenipotentiary	September 23, 1931	April 2, 1932	Left Riga April 29, 1933	
John Van Antwerp MacMurray – Career FSO	Envoy Extraordinary and Minister Plenipotentiary	August 28, 1933	January 4, 1934	Left Riga February 12, 1936	
Arthur Bliss Lane – Career FSO	Envoy Extraordinary and Minister Plenipotentiary	January 24, 1936	September 10, 1936	Left Riga September 16, 1937	
Frederick A. Sterling – Career FSO	Envoy Extraordinary and Minister Plenipotentiary	August 9, 1937	—	—	
John C. Wiley – Career FSO	Envoy Extraordinary and Minister Plenipotentiary	July 18, 1938	November 24, 1938	June 17, 1940	Soviet forces occupied Tallinn and Riga on June 17, 1940, which effectively ended the U.S. diplomatic presence in those nations. The legation in Tallinn was officially closed, September 5, 1940.
The United States announced its readiness to reestablish relations with Estonia on September 2, 1991. Embassy Tallinn was established on October 2, 1991, with Robert C. Frasure as Chargé d'Affaires ad interim. He was subsequently commissioned as ambassador. The embassy was established in the same building on Kentmanni Street that had been the U.S. legation before the World War II.
Robert C. Frasure – Career FSO	Ambassador Extraordinary and Plenipotentiary	March 23, 1992	April 9, 1992	July 8, 1994	The following officers served as chargés d’affaires ad interim: Keith Smith (July–December 1994), and Jon Gundersen (December 1994 – August 1995).
Lawrence P. Taylor – Career FSO	Ambassador Extraordinary and Plenipotentiary	June 27, 1995	August 3, 1995	August 7, 1997	
Melissa Foelsch Wells – Career FSO	Ambassador Extraordinary and Plenipotentiary	October 1, 1998	November 3, 1998	September 10, 2001	
Joseph M. DeThomas – Career FSO	Ambassador Extraordinary and Plenipotentiary	November 5, 2001	December 11, 2001	July 7, 2004	
Aldona Wos – Political appointee	Ambassador Extraordinary and Plenipotentiary	August 2, 2004	September 2, 2004	December 17, 2006	
Stanley Davis Phillips – Political appointee	Ambassador Extraordinary and Plenipotentiary	March 21, 2007	May 31, 2007	January 16, 2009	
Karen B. Decker – Career FSO	Chargé d'Affaires ad interim	January 16, 2009		December 10, 2009	
Michael C. Polt – Career FSO	Ambassador Extraordinary and Plenipotentiary	September 25, 2009	December 10, 2009	July 22, 2012	
Robert S. Gilchrist – Career FSO	Chargé d'Affaires ad interim	July 22, 2012		September 17, 2012	
Jeffrey D. Levine – Career FSO	Ambassador Extraordinary and Plenipotentiary	February 17, 2012	September 17, 2012	September 27, 2015	
James D. Melville Jr. – Career FSO	Ambassador Extraordinary and Plenipotentiary	May 7, 2015	December 8, 2015	July 29, 2018	
Elizabeth Horst – Career FSO	Chargé d’Affaires ad interim	July 29, 2018		August 2, 2019	
Brian Roraff - Career FSO	Chargé d’Affaires ad interim	August 2, 2019		July 22, 2022	
Gabrielle Cowan - Career FSO	Chargé d’Affaires ad interim	July 22, 2022		January 30, 2023	
George P. Kent - Career FSO	Ambassador Extraordinary and Plenipotentiary	December 21, 2022	February 21, 2023	January 20, 2025	
Matthew E. Wall - Career FSO	Chargé d’Affaires ad interim	January 20, 2025		November 26, 2025	
Roman Pipko - Political appointee	Ambassador Extraordinary and Plenipotentiary	October 7, 2025	November 26, 2025	Present	

== See also ==
- Embassy of the United States, Tallinn
- Estonian Embassy, Washington, D.C.
- Estonia – United States relations
- Foreign relations of Estonia
- Ambassadors of the United States
