= Coordinating Council on Jerusalem =

The Coordinating Council on Jerusalem was a lobbying group launched on October 23, 2007, in order to unite American Jewish organizations on behalf of a secure and unified Jerusalem. The creation of political strategist Jeff Ballabon, it was founded to provide a united public front of Jewish American organizations towards the principle of keeping Jerusalem united. Initial funding was provided by Rabbi Pesach Lerner, Executive Vice President of the National Council of Young Israel. It has been endorsed by hundreds of Jewish leaders in the Diaspora and Israel.

== History ==
In preparation for the Annapolis Peace summit with Palestinian Authority President Mahmoud Abbas and United States Secretary of State Condoleezza Rice, ministers of Israeli Prime Minister Ehud Olmert’s government put forth their view that Jerusalem was negotiable and opened the door to concessions of parts of Jerusalem, including the Temple Mount, which is considered by many to be Judaism’s holiest site. Following his ministers’ remarks, Olmert himself questioned the value of maintaining Jewish sovereignty over certain Jerusalem neighborhoods. As a result, many Jewish leaders around the world who held to a policy of not publicly challenging decisions of Israel's government, have chosen to coalesce around the position: opposing Israeli negotiations which include any discussion of ceding sovereignty over part or all of Jerusalem.

Through his reading of the significance of negotiating on Jerusalem, Rabbi Lerner asked Jeffrey Ballabon, a nationally experienced strategist with expertise in issue campaigns, crisis management and government relations to recommend and execute a broad-based international strategy to ensure continued Israeli sovereignty over all of Jerusalem. As a first step, the two called for the creation of a body to coordinate and leverage efforts in Israel and the Diaspora to secure Jewish interests in Jerusalem’s future.

The formation of the Coordinating Council for Jerusalem marks the first time since the establishment of the State of Israel that a significant group of American Jewish organizations have created a broad united front to pursue a policy directly involving Israel that is based on an explicit principle that supersedes deference to the sitting Israeli government. Notably, many of the organizations on the Coordinating Council are among the State of Israel’s most loyal and active supporters.

Within hours of the announcement of their intent to create the Coordinating Council, Lerner and Ballabon were contacted by many groups, within the U.S. and Israel, which also had decided to coordinate their efforts against any Jerusalem negotiations.

In coordination with CCJ's efforts, a majority of the Israeli Knesset signed on to a letter declaring that they would not support any division of Jerusalem. Subsequently, the Knesset passed a law requiring a two-thirds supermajority of Knesset in order to make any changes to the borders or status of Jerusalem.

CCJ also announced from the outset that it would be working closely and coordinating efforts with major Christian Zionist organizations and leaders.

CCJ and CCJ member organizations have held meetings to put forward their position with U.S. national leaders, including former Secretary of State Condoleezza Rice, former President George W. Bush's National Security Adviser Stephen Hadley and former Deputy National Security Advisor Elliott Abrams, to inform them of the opposition to any negotiations that would cede any part of Jerusalem. Olmert has stated that American Jews and Jewish groups have no right or place to interfere with Israel's government matters.

The Coordinating Council on Jerusalem includes Americans for a Safe Israel, Association for Jewish Outreach Programs, Emunah of America, Hineni, Jerusalem Reclamation Project, National Conference of Synagogue Youth, National Council of Young Israel, One Israel Fund, Poalei Agudath Israel of America, Rabbinic Alliance to Save Jerusalem, Rabbinical Alliance of America, Rabbinical Council of America, Religious Zionists of America, Russian Jewish Community Foundation, Union of Orthodox Jewish Congregations (OU), Unity Coalition for Israel, Young Israel Council of Rabbis, and Zionist Organization of America.

In January 2008, Coordinating Council on Jerusalem publicly announced a strategic alliance with Natan Sharansky's One Jerusalem.

=== Opposition to CCJ ===
While there is a steady group of supporters for the CCJ and its position, groups affiliated with the traditional Jewish left have stated opposition to CCJ and support for Olmert's position. Olmert himself was critical of CCJ and publicly denounced the involvement of Diaspora Jews within a few days of the announcement of the formation of CCJ. He subsequently backtracked on that position.

== See also ==
- Israel lobby in the United States
