= Jeff Ballabon =

American lobbyist, political advisor

- Education: Yale Law School; Yeshiva University
- Occupations: Media executive; lobbyist; political advisor; consultant

Jeff (Jeffrey) Ballabon is an American media executive, lobbyist, political advisor, and consultant.

== Early life ==
Ballabon was born and raised in an Orthodox Jewish family in New York City. He received undergraduate degrees from the Ner Israel Rabbinical College and Yeshiva University, and a JD from Yale Law School. During law school, he interned at the State of Israel's Ministry of Justice, where he worked on the formulation of Israel's Basic Law: Human Dignity and Liberty.

== Career ==
Ballabon began his career in government in the 1990s as legislative counsel to Senator John C. Danforth, and Republican counsel to the United States Senate Committee on Commerce, Science, and Transportation. He was responsible for a number of initiatives, including drafting the appropriation amendment to fund the "Troops to Teachers" program and getting it passed by Congress.

As a government relations and communications consultant and political adviser, Ballabon has run his own companies, Ballabon Group, B2 Strategic, and Short Cove Advisors, and has been the New York affiliate of Washington, D. C.'s, The Livingston Group. His clients have included media, energy, biotech, intellectual property, health care and defense companies, real-estate developers, law firms, private investment funds, non-profits, and political candidates and campaigns.

As a media executive, he served as senior vice president of communications for CBS Corporation, overseeing public relations and communications for CBS News, and before that served as head of government relations and public policy for Primedia and Court TV.

=== CBS ===
At CBS, he originated the rebranding of the network's CBS Reports television documentary brand into a new coordinated cross-platform brand. Its 2009 debut of the CBS Reports concept, CBS Reports: Children of the Recession, won the Columbia School of Journalism's Alfred DuPont Award. Ballabon was CBS News' spokesman during high-profile litigation, including the Dan Rather v CBS Corp. "Memogate" litigation and the alleged attempted blackmail of Late Night host David Letterman by a CBS News producer. He helped launch shows, including CBS News' new morning show, and integrate CBS News' online "new media" reporting and presence with traditional CBS News television and radio. On the death of Walter Cronkite, Ballabon oversaw CBS' dissemination of all media about Cronkite worldwide and media, publicity, and event coordination of Cronkite's funeral and CBS's Lincoln Center tribute to Cronkite.

=== Primedia ===
Ballabon led public policy on a range of issues for Primedia, including online properties, over 300 magazine titles, and 18 satellite television networks. Ballabon managed policy for these companies and titles including About.com, IntelliChoice, Channel One News, Films for the Humanities and Sciences, Films Media Group, Workplace Learning, Homeland One, Law Enforcement Television Network, Fire and Emergency Training Network, as well as magazine companies and titles, including Weekly Reader, Tiger Beat, Seventeen, Modern Bride, New York, Soap Opera Digest, Guns & Ammo, Shotgun News, Automobile, Motor Trend, Hot Rod, Lowrider, Bike, Powerboat & Motoryacht, Skateboarder, and Snowboarder. Primedia's Channel One News, an advertising-supported in-school news show, had become a political target. Among the issues he oversaw were federal and state campaigns, challenges to advertising content in schools, privacy and data collection, postal rates, state taxes and numerous other issues.

=== Court TV ===
Ballabon was at Court TV in the 1990s, an era of extremely high-profile trials, including the Menéndez brothers and O. J. Simpson murder trials. While at Court TV, Ballabon was responsible for getting camera access for the media to televise a number of high-profile trials. He negotiated a federal rule permitting the closed-circuit televising of the Timothy McVeigh ("Oklahoma City Bomber") murder trial to survivors of the crime and to victims' families. He also was executive producer of Court TV's weekly block of programming for legal professionals.

=== Politics ===
Ballabon was heavily involved with the election campaigns of George W. Bush and with the Bush administration. He has been involved as well in a number of House and Senate election campaigns, including John Ashcroft, Sam Brownback, Rick Santorum, and Bob Turner, and was a surrogate for the Mitt Romney campaign. As a fund-raiser for the 2004 Bush campaign, he co-chaired a dinner that reportedly "raked in $4 million".

Ballabon was a prominent supporter of Donald Trump's candidacy. He led the 2016 initiative to change the Republican Party's platform language on Israel and worked closely with the Trump campaign on its Israel policy. Since the election, Ballabon has been a member of the Donald J Trump For President Advisory Board and appeared on media as a Trump surrogate.

Ballabon has been in leadership of media industry groups, including Magazine Publishers of America, Cable Television Public Affairs Association, the New York Bar Association Media Committee, and the American Media Institute.

He has been affiliated with several conservative policy organizations and think-tanks, including the Federalist Society, the London Center for Public Policy Research, and the American Conservative Union Foundation. He was on the board of the Ronald Reagan Legacy Foundation.

Ballabon founded the Coordinating Council on Jerusalem. He is a member of the American Center for Law and Justice, and is active in Jewish communal and political affairs.

He is credited as the creator of the term Jexodus, which he describes as "the new non-partisan war against political & media anti-Semitism."

In March 2019 he received both praise and criticism for referring to Congresswoman Ilhan Omar as "filth" when asked about statements by Omar that were widely as antisemitic. In April 2019, reacting to continuing antisemitic remarks by Omar he argued that, because of her prominent position in government, she was "more dangerous than David Duke and Louis Farrakhan combined."

== Impact on culture ==
A character in the 1997 novel Bag Men by Mark Costello was based on Ballabon.

In 2004, Forward Magazine named Ballabon one of the 50 "Most Influential" Jews in America.
