= Robert C. Frasure =

United States diplomat (1942–1995)

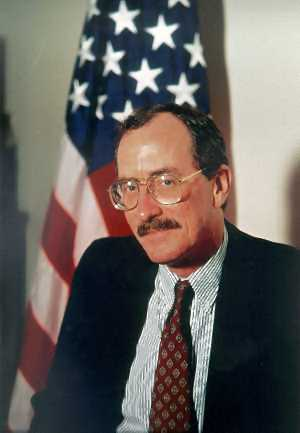

United States Ambassador to Estonia
- In office March 23, 1992 – July 8, 1994
- President: George H. W. Bush
- Succeeded by: Lawrence Palmer Taylor

Personal details
- Born: April 20, 1942 Morgantown, West Virginia, US
- Died: August 19, 1995 (aged 53) Igman mountain, Bosnia and Herzegovina
- Resting place: Arlington National Cemetery
- Education: West Virginia University; London School of Economics; Duke University.
- Profession: Diplomat, Career Ambassador
- Awards: Presidential Citizens Medal

Robert C. Frasure (April 20, 1942 – August 19, 1995) was an American diplomat and the first United States Ambassador to Estonia following Estonia's regained independence from the Soviet Union.

== Biography ==
Born in Morgantown, West Virginia, to parents who were educators, he attended West Virginia University, the London School of Economics and received a Ph.D. from Duke University. He was a member of Phi Beta Kappa. He taught briefly at Duke and the University of the South and contributed to various professional journals including the American Political Science Review.

He joined the Foreign Service in 1974. His overseas posts included Geneva, Bonn, Lagos, London, Pretoria and Addis Ababa. He received two State Department Superior Honors for his contributions to diplomacy in Africa that led to the withdrawal of Cuban troops from Angola in 1989 and the independence of Namibia in 1991. During 1990–1991, he served as the Africa Director at the National Security Council.

He initiated the reestablishment of the American diplomatic presence in Estonia as Chargé d'affaires in September 1991, following Estonia's reconfirmation of independence from the Soviet Union, and was sworn in as the first "post-Soviet" American Ambassador to Estonia on March 26, 1992.

He left Estonia in 1994 and became Deputy Assistant Secretary of State in the Bureau of European and Canadian Affairs with particular responsibility for Bosnia.

== Death ==
aftermath of the accident

Frasure was killed in an automobile accident on the Igman mountain near Sarajevo, Bosnia and Herzegovina on August 19, 1995, while on a mission to negotiate a U.S. proposal to end the conflict in Bosnia. Col. Sam Nelson Drew and Joseph J. Kruzel Jr. were also killed. The trio had to travel over Igman in order reach the besieged Bosnian capital. The main roads, which were not as dangerous as the narrow mountain roads, were blocked by the Serbs besieging Sarajevo, forcing the diplomats to take the more dangerous route.

On December 15, 1995, he was awarded the Presidential Citizens Medal, posthumously, by President Clinton for Exceptional Service for his role in the downfall of the Mengistu regime in Ethiopia and the airlifting of more than 15,000 Ethiopian Jews to Israel.

In 2010, a street in Sarajevo was named in his honor. The US Embassy in Bosnia and Herzegovina is located in the street. Hillary Clinton opened the new embassy and announced the new street name in October 2010.

The Robert C. Frasure Award is named after him.

Frasure, as Special Envoy to the President, was buried at Arlington National Cemetery.

Diplomatic posts
Preceded by Seat established	United States Ambassador to Estonia; 1992–1994	Succeeded by Lawrence P. Taylor
