= Tom Held =

Austrian-American film editor

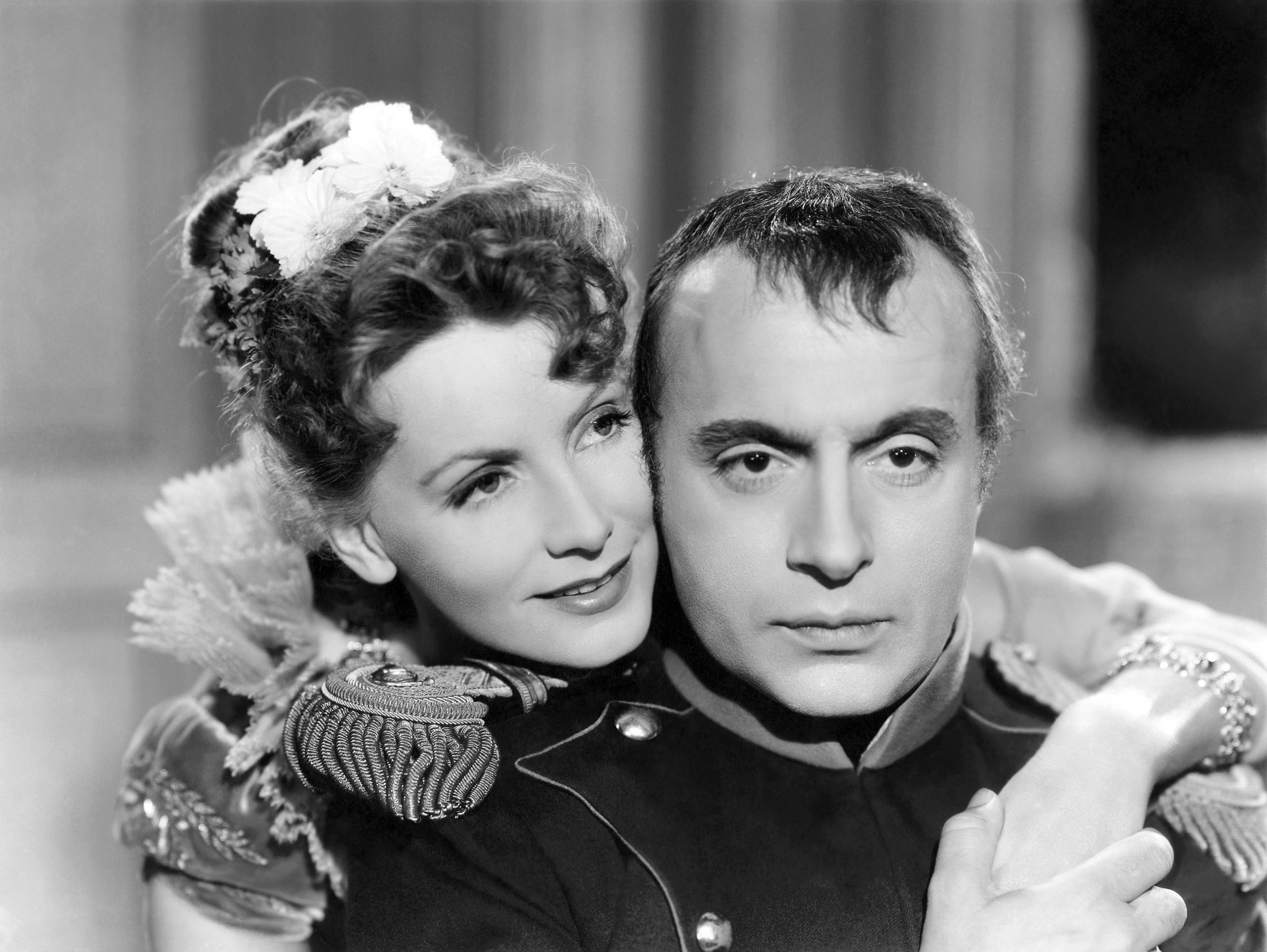
- Modern Screen 1937 Conquest
- Born: Thomas Held; August 31, 1889; Vienna, Austria
- Died: March 13, 1962 (aged 72)
- Occupations: Film editor Assistant director
- Years active: 1920–1939
- Spouse: Emma J. Thompson

Tom Held (August 31, 1889 – March 13, 1962) was an Austrian-born American film editor. He was nominated for two Academy awards. Both were for Best Film Editing and both were during the 11th Academy Awards. His two nominated films were The Great Waltz and Test Pilot.

He started as an assistant director in the 1920s.

== Filmography ==
=== As editor ===
- The Wizard of Oz (1939) (Second assistant editor, uncredited)
- The Great Waltz (1938)
- Test Pilot (1938)
- Conquest (1937)
- The Good Earth (1937) (editing staff, uncredited)
- The Devil is a Sissy (1936)
- San Francisco (1936)
- Three Live Ghosts (1936)
- After Office Hours (1935)
- Escapade (1935)
- I Live My Life (1935)
- One New York Night (1935)
- Forsaking All Others (1934)
- The Girl from Missouri (1934)
- Tarzan and His Mate (1934)
- The Barbarian (1933)
- But the Flesh Is Weak (1932)
- Rasputin and the Empress (1932)
- Skyscraper Souls (1932)
- Tarzan the Ape Man (1932)
- Daybreak (1931)
- Le chanteur de Seville (1931)
- The Sin of Madelon Claudet (1931)
- Men of the North (1930)
- Sevilla de mis amores (1930)
- They Learned About Women (1930) (uncredited)

=== As assistant director ===
- Fugitives (1929)
- Wild Oats Lane (1926)
- The Sporting Venus (1925)
- Minnie (1922)
- Penrod (1922)
- The Strangers' Banquet (1922)
- The River's End (1920)
