= George P. Kent =

American diplomat (born 1967)

George Kent
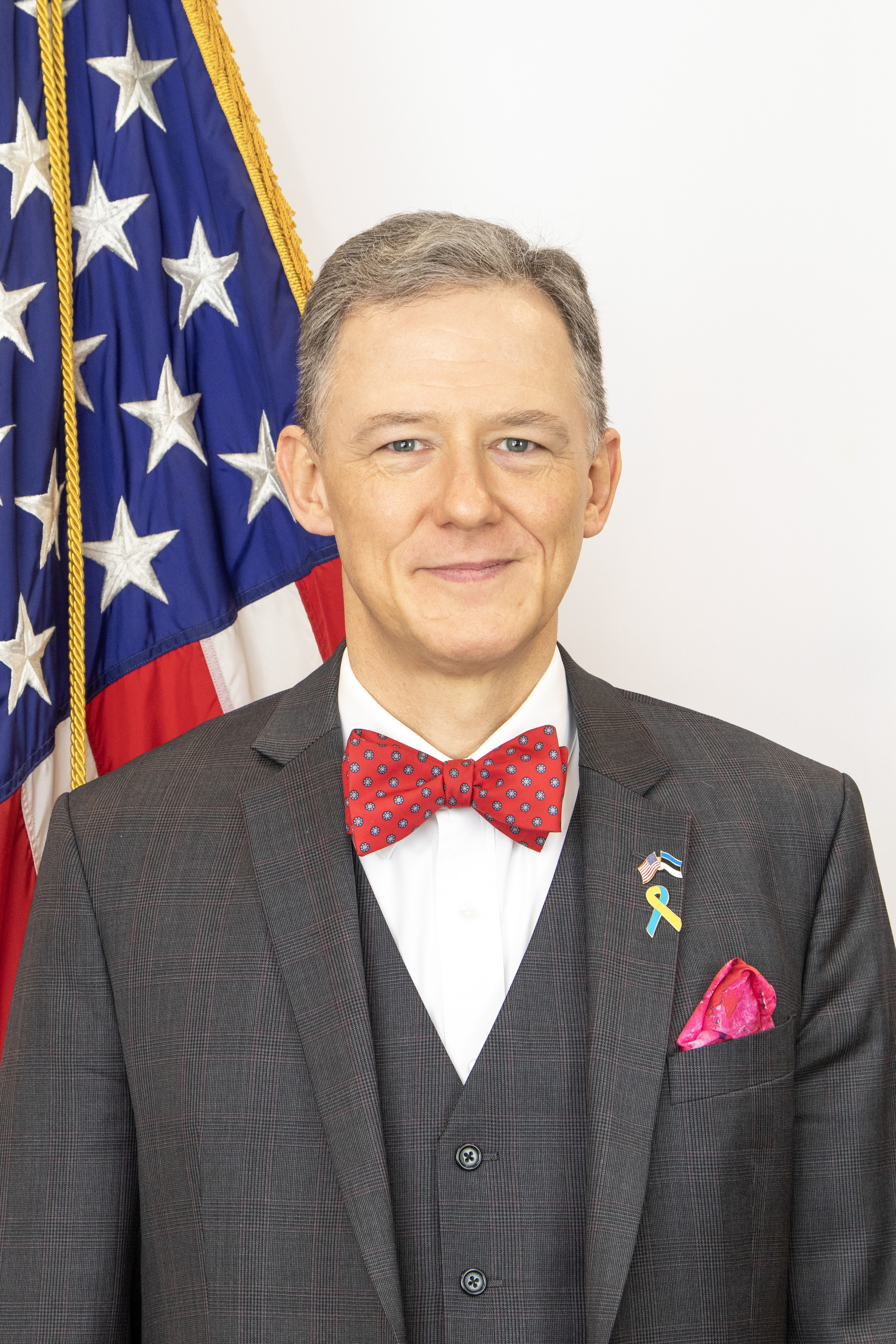

United States Ambassador to Estonia
- In office February 21, 2023 – January 20, 2025
- President: Joe Biden
- Preceded by: James D. Melville Jr. (2018)
- Succeeded by: Roman Pipko

United States Deputy Assistant Secretary of State for the Bureau of European and Eurasian Affairs
- In office September 4, 2018 – September 3, 2021
- President: Donald Trump; Joe Biden

U.S. Deputy Chief of Mission to Ukraine
- In office 2015–2018
- President: Barack Obama; Donald Trump
- Succeeded by: Pamela Tremont

Personal details
- Education: Harvard University (AB); Johns Hopkins University (MA); National Defense University (MS)

George P. Kent is an American diplomat who served as the United States ambassador to Estonia from 2023 to 2025.

Kent served as deputy assistant secretary of state for the European and Eurasian Affairs from 2018 to 2021. As a career United States Foreign Service officer, his early service has included assignments in the U.S. diplomatic missions to Poland, Thailand and Uzbekistan. In 2004, he was assigned to serve as deputy political counselor in Kyiv, Ukraine, and was deputy chief of mission in Kyiv from 2015 to 2018.

On October 15, 2019, Kent gave a deposition in the House impeachment inquiry of President Trump. He appeared again before the House Intelligence Committee in a public hearing alongside Ambassador Bill Taylor, the U.S. chargé d'affaires ad interim to Ukraine.

== Education ==
Kent graduated from high school in 1985 at Porter-Gaud School in Charleston, South Carolina. He graduated in 1989 with a Bachelor of Arts in Russian History & Literature from Harvard University. He then earned a Master of Arts from the School of Advanced International Studies at Johns Hopkins University in 1992. Kent later graduated with a Master of Science in national resource strategy from the Industrial College of the Armed Forces of the National Defense University in 2012.

== Career ==
Kent has been a member of the United States Foreign Service since 1992. He speaks Ukrainian, Russian, and Thai, as well as some Polish, German, and Italian. He has worked as a U.S. Foreign Service officer in Ukraine, Poland, Thailand and Uzbekistan.

From 1995 to 1997, he was posted in Warsaw, Poland, as an economics officer dealing with trade, environmental, and counter-narcotics issues.

=== Ukraine appointments ===
Kent was later assigned to serve as deputy political counselor in Kyiv, Ukraine, from 2004 to 2007, which included the time period of the Orange Revolution. From 2012 to 2014, Kent served as director of the Bureau of International Narcotics and Law Enforcement Affairs. He served as a senior anti-corruption coordinator in the European bureau in 2014–2015, and as deputy chief of mission in Kyiv from 2015 to 2018.

On September 4, 2018, he was appointed to the position of Deputy Assistant Secretary of State for European and Eurasian Affairs and held this position until September 3, 2021.

External videos
- Testimony of Kent and Ambassador William Taylor before the House Intelligence Committee, November 13, 2019, C-SPAN

On October 15, 2019, Kent gave a deposition in the House impeachment inquiry of President Trump, serving as a key witness on whether Rudy Giuliani used a campaign of disinformation to undermine the former ambassador to Ukraine, Marie Yovanovitch. Kent's warnings regarding the disinformation campaign are documented in State Department emails submitted to Congress by the organization's inspector general. Kent protested a "fake news smear" directed at Ambassador Yovanovitch by media commentators supportive of President Trump. He also criticized the Ukrainian prosecutor undermining Yovanovitch, calling the disinformation "complete poppycock." On November 13, 2019, along with Ambassador Bill Taylor, Kent gave public testimony to the House Intelligence Committee during the first public hearing.

While serving as interim Charge d'affaires at the Embassy of the United States, Kyiv during the summer of 2021, Kent embarked on a press tour of local Ukrainian media. In one interview, Kent opined that the differences between Russia and Ukraine are distilled in the paintings of Ilya Repin. Burlaki, per Kent, shows the "servile and slavish character of the people" in the country, however Reply of the Zaporozhian Cossacks illustrates the "dignity and imbued liberty of Ukraine."

=== U.S. ambassador to Estonia ===
On September 2, 2022, President Joe Biden nominated Kent serve as the next ambassador to Estonia. His nomination was sent to the Senate on September 8, 2022. On November 29, 2022, hearings on his nomination were held before the Senate Foreign Relations Committee. On December 7, 2022, the committee favorably reported his nomination to the Senate. On December 13, 2022, his nomination was confirmed in the Senate by voice vote. On January 30, 2023, Kent arrived in Estonia. Kent presented his credentials to Estonian President Alar Karis on February 21, 2023. Kent's Estonian appointment ended in January 2025.

Diplomatic posts
Preceded by James D. Melville Jr.	United States Ambassador to Estonia; 2023–2025	Succeeded by Roman Pipko
