= Michael C. Polt =

American diplomat (born 1954)

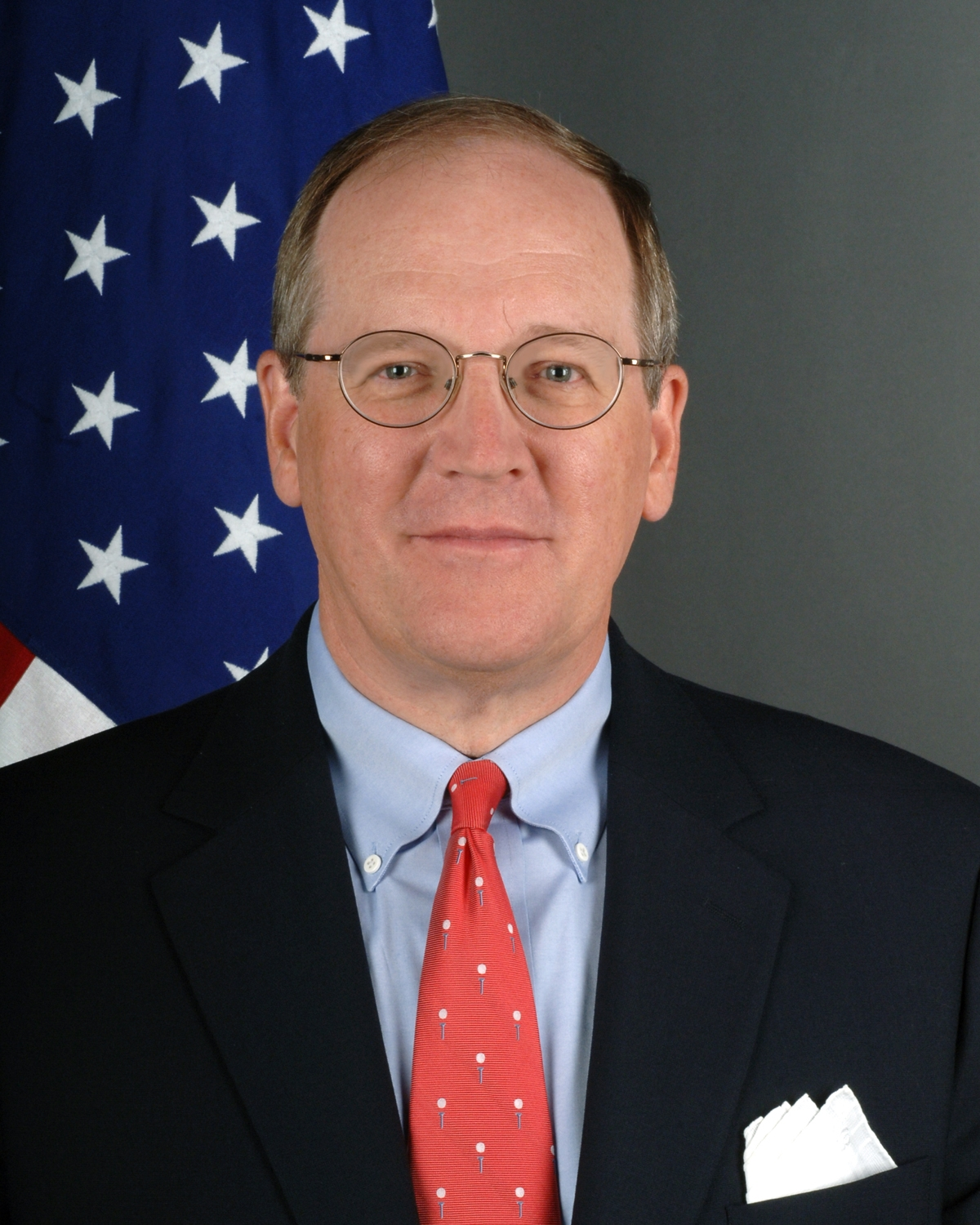
- Official portrait, 2009

United States Ambassador to Estonia
- In office December 10, 2009 – July 22, 2012
- Preceded by: Karen B. Decker (interim)
- Succeeded by: Jeffrey D. Levine

United States Ambassador to Serbia
- In office June 2006 – July 2007
- Preceded by: Himself (as ambassador to Serbia and Montenegro)
- Succeeded by: Cameron Munter

United States Ambassador to Serbia and Montenegro
- In office May 21, 2004 – June 2006
- Preceded by: William Dale Montgomery
- Succeeded by: Himself (as ambassador to Serbia)

Personal details
- Born: 1954 (age 71–72) Allied-occupied Austria
- Spouse: Hallie Polt
- Education: University of Tennessee

Michael Christian Polt (born 1954) is an American diplomat. He served as the U.S. Ambassador to Estonia from 2009 to 2012 and as U.S. Ambassador to Serbia and Montenegro from 2004 to 2006 and its successor state Serbia from 2006 to 2007. Currently he is a senior director at the McCain Institute.

== Early life and education ==
Polt was born in 1954 Austria during the Allied occupation there following World War II. Michael attended the American International School of Düsseldorf (Germany), graduating in 1972. He holds a bachelor's degree and an Honorary Doctorate from American International College in Springfield, Massachusetts, and a master's degree in Public Administration from the University of Tennessee.

== Career ==
Polt assumed his position as a Senior Director of the McCain Institute for International Leadership on October 1, 2012, after concluding his 35-year diplomatic career and following his last assignment as the U.S. ambassador to Estonia in late 2009. Polt also served previously as U.S. Ambassador to Serbia and Montenegro and its successor state Serbia after the former disbanded. Prior to his ambassadorial missions, the Ambassador was Principal Deputy and Acting Assistant Secretary of State for Legislative Affairs in the Powell and Clinton State Departments.

During his three decades as a career diplomat, Polt served as U.S. Minister and Deputy Chief of Mission of the U.S. Embassy in Berlin, Germany and Deputy Chief of Mission and Charge’ d’ Affaires of the U.S. Embassy in Bern, Switzerland. He has also served as Senior Advisor to the Director General of the Foreign Service for Management Reform and was a key member of the Senior Management Steering Board directing the State Department's 2003 to 2005 multi-million dollar reinvention of its Diplomatic Communications System.

Polt has held other senior positions in the Department of State, as Deputy Director for European Security and Arms Control issues, and in Panama City as Political Counselor of the U.S. Embassy during the time leading up to the U.S. military action against the Noriega regime in 1989. During his earlier career, Polt was assigned to Embassies in Bonn, Mexico City, and Copenhagen, as well as the U.S. Consulate in Bremen, Germany.

Polt has been the repeated recipient of the Presidential Meritorious Service Award and numerous Department of State Meritorious and Superior Honor Awards for Outstanding Policy Leadership, Management, Crisis Performance, and Political Analysis. He has been awarded the Thomas Jefferson Award for Service to U.S. Citizens Overseas by American Citizens Abroad. He is a member of the Board of the Baltic American Freedom Foundation and member of the American Academy of Diplomacy as well as the American Foreign Service Association.

== Honors ==
- Estonia : Recipient First Class of the Order of the Cross of Terra Mariana (27.06.2012, serie 1029 - decision n° 112)

Diplomatic posts
Preceded by William Dale Montgomery	United States Ambassador to Serbia and Montenegro; May 2004 – June 2006	Succeeded by Himself (as ambassador to Serbia)
Preceded by Himself (as ambassador to Serbia and Montenegro)	United States Ambassador to Serbia; June 2006 – July 2007	Succeeded by Cameron Munter
Preceded by Stanley Davis Phillips	United States Ambassador to Estonia; December 2009 – July 2012	Succeeded by Jeffrey D. Levine
