= The Exodus Movement =

American political organization

- Type: Political initiative
- Key people: Elizabeth Pipko
- Funding: Red Sea Rising PAC
- Website: theexodusmovement.com
- Formerly called: Jexodus

The Exodus Movement (formerly known as Jexodus), is an American right-wing political campaign aimed at encouraging Jews to leave the Democratic Party. Spokesperson Elizabeth Pipko states that, while "overwhelmingly, the Jewish people have supported Democrats over the years," she believes that the Republican Party can make inroads.

== History ==
Jexodus was launched in early March 2019 at the 2019 Conservative Political Action Conference (CPAC).

In 2019, the Jexodus website stated that they are "a non-partisan nonprofit that unites people of good will – regardless of faith, ethnicity, identity, and political affiliation – around the simple, formerly non-controversial idea that Anti-Semitism must never be mainstreamed by the media or by any political party."

The organization was started by Jeff Ballabon, an advisor to Donald Trump and a Republican Party lobbyist. Elizabeth Pipko, a Trump supporter, is the group's spokesperson. Jexodus has been criticized as "likely a clumsy astroturf effort rather than an actual grassroots movement", in part because the Jexodus website was registered November 5, 2018 – before the congressional election and before those representatives it accused of antisemitism had even been elected. On March 12, 2019, Trump tweeted his support of the movement. Jexodus has been described as "far right" by Haaretz and as "fringe" by Yahoo! News.

Jexodus became The Exodus Movement on March 21, 2019. The name change came after widespread ridicule of the name "Jexodus" for the redundancy of calling for a "Jewish Exodus" when The Exodus was Jewish to begin with.

== See also ==
- Blexit
- Project Esther
- WalkAway campaign
- Michael the Black Man
