= Park East Day School =

Coordinates: 40°46′2.32″N 73°57′47.56″W

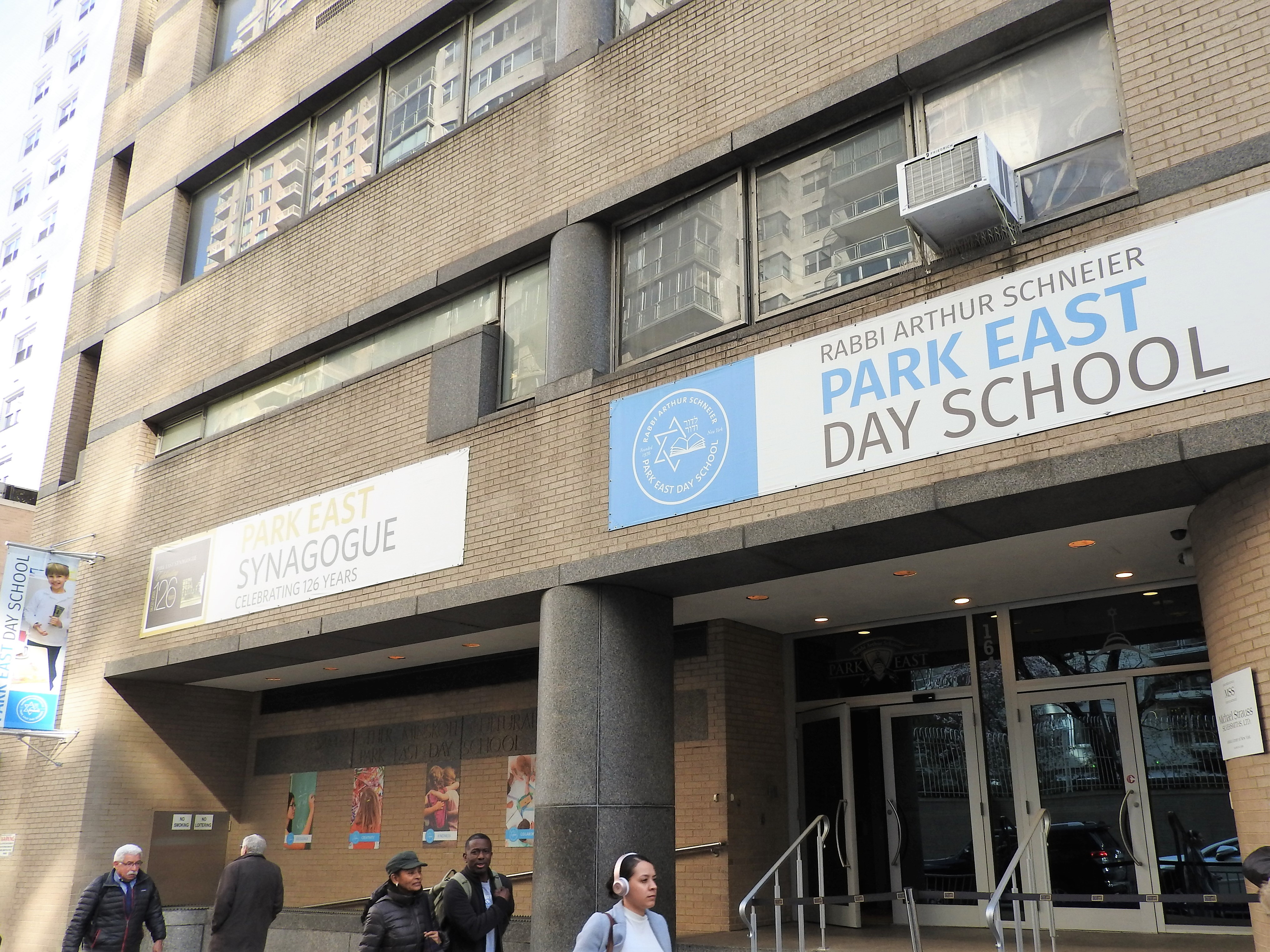
- Front

Information
- Dean: Rabbi Arthur Schneier
- Principal: Mrs. Debbie Rochlin

Park East Day School (officially called Rabbi Arthur Schneier Park East Day School) is a Jewish day school located on the Upper East Side of the borough of Manhattan in New York City. It includes an early childhood program, an elementary school, and a middle school that graduates students after eighth grade. In the 1950s Rabbi Zev Zahavy and his wife Edith, a noted educator, founded the school with funding from Henry H. Minskoff. In 1976 Rabbi Arthur Schneier started Park-East's early childhood facility (a nursery school). In 1981, the nursery school merged with the East Side Hebrew Institute ("ESHI"), once one of the major Jewish institutions of the Lower East Side, which had classes ranging from Nursery, Kindergarten and up to the 12th grade. The new merged school was named "Park East ESHI". Several years later, the new school board omitted the word "ESHI" and in 1990 they renamed the school after Rabbi Schneier.

It offers a dual curricula of general studies and Jewish studies. The school is noted for the strength of its mathematics, science, STEM and technology programs.

Rabbi Arthur Schneier, the school's founder, serves as dean. From 2004 until her retirement in 2021 the school was led by Barbara Etra. Today, the principal is Debbie Rochlin, who was previously the director of admissions and the director of early childhood. The board of trustees chairman is Roman Pipko.

== Notable alumni ==
- Benjamin Kallos - lawyer and politician
- Elizabeth Pipko - model and political operative
