= Melissa F. Wells =

American diplomat (1932–2025)

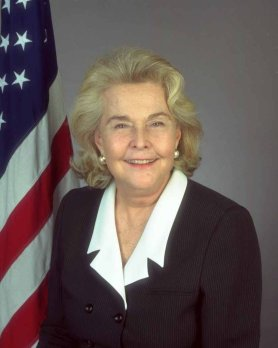

United States Ambassador to Estonia
- In office October 1, 1998 – September 10, 2001
- President: Bill Clinton; George W. Bush
- Preceded by: Lawrence P. Taylor
- Succeeded by: Joseph M. DeThomas

United States Ambassador to the Democratic Republic of the Congo
- In office April 25, 1991 – March 21, 1992
- President: George H. W. Bush
- Preceded by: William C. Harrop
- Succeeded by: Daniel H. Simpson

United States Ambassador to Mozambique
- In office September 11, 1987 – October 12, 1990
- President: Ronald Reagan; George H. W. Bush
- Preceded by: Peter Jon de Vos
- Succeeded by: Townsend B. Friedman Jr.

United States Ambassador to Guinea-Bissau
- In office September 16, 1976 – March 29, 1977
- President: Gerald Ford
- Preceded by: office created
- Succeeded by: Edward Marks

Personal details
- Born: Melissa Foelsch Wells; November 18, 1932 Tallinn, Estonia
- Died: July 12, 2025 (aged 92) Potomac, Maryland, U.S.
- Parent: Miliza Korjus (mother)

Melissa Foelsch Wells (November 18, 1932 – July 12, 2025) was an American diplomat who was the United States Ambassador to Cape Verde and to Guinea-Bissau (1976–77), Mozambique (1987–90), Congo-Kinshasa (1991–93), and Estonia (1998–2001).

Wells was a member of the American Academy of Diplomacy.

Wells died on July 12, 2025, at the age of 92. She was the daughter of opera singer and film actress Miliza Korjus (1909–1980).

Diplomatic posts
Preceded by office created	United States Ambassador to Guinea-Bissau; September 16, 1976 – March 29, 1977	Succeeded by Edward Marks
Preceded by Peter Jon de Vos	United States Ambassador to Mozambique; September 11, 1987 – October 12, 1990	Succeeded by Townsend B. Friedman Jr.
Preceded by William C. Harrop	United States Ambassador to the Democratic Republic of the Congo; April 25, 1991 – March 21, 1992	Succeeded by Daniel H. Simpson
Preceded by Lawrence P. Taylor	United States Ambassador to Estonia; October 1, 1998 – September 10, 2001	Succeeded by Joseph M. DeThomas
