= The Great Waltz (1938 film) =

1938 American film

- Directed by: Julien Duvivier; Victor Fleming (uncredited); Josef von Sternberg (uncredited)
- Written by: Gottfried Reinhardt (story); Samuel Hoffenstein; Walter Reisch; Vicki Baum (story, uncredited)
- Produced by: Bernard H. Hyman
- Starring: Fernand Gravet; Luise Rainer; Miliza Korjus
- Cinematography: Joseph Ruttenberg
- Edited by: Tom Held
- Music by: Johann Strauss Jr. Arthur Gutmann; Dimitri Tiomkin; Paul Marquardt
- Distributed by: Metro-Goldwyn-Mayer
- Release date: November 4, 1938
- Running time: 104 minutes
- Country: United States
- Language: English
- Budget: $2,260,000
- Box office: $2,422,000

The Great Waltz is a 1938 American biographical film based very loosely on the life of Johann Strauss II. It starred Luise Rainer, Fernand Gravet (Gravey), and Miliza Korjus. Rainer received top billing at the producer's insistence, but her role is comparatively minor as Strauss' wife, Poldi Vogelhuber. It was the only starring role for Korjus, who was a famous opera soprano and played one in the film.

Joseph Ruttenberg won the Academy Award for Best Cinematography. Korjus was nominated for Supporting Actress, and Tom Held for Film Editing. The film was popular in Australia, and was distributed largely throughout Sydney and Melbourne for two years after its initial release.

The film has no connection with the 1934 Broadway play The Great Waltz. Hitchcock's Waltzes from Vienna set the stage for this Julien Duvivier’s Strauss biopic, which maintains the character of the baker's daughter from the original stage musical while focusing on Johann Strauss II's revolutionary inclinations and the creation of his popular operetta, Die Fledermaus.

== Plot ==
"Schani" is dismissed from his job in a bank. He puts together a group of unemployed musicians who wangle a performance at Dommayer's cafe. The audience is minimal, but when two opera singers, Carla Donner and Fritz Schiller, visit whilst their carriage is being repaired, the music attracts a wider audience.

Strauss is caught up in a student protest; he and Carla Donner avoid arrest and escape to the Vienna Woods, where he is inspired to create the waltz "Tales from the Vienna Woods".

Carla asks Strauss for some music to sing at an aristocratic soiree, and this leads to the composer receiving a publishing contract. He's on his way, and he can now marry Poldi Vogelhuber, his sweetheart. But the closeness of Strauss and Carla Donner, during rehearsals of operettas, attracts comment, not least from Count Hohenfried, Donner's admirer.

Poldi remains loyal to Strauss, and the marriage is a long one. He is received by the Kaiser Franz Joseph I of Austria (whom he unknowingly insulted in the aftermath of the student protests), and the two stand before cheering crowds on the balcony of Schönbrunn.

== Cast ==
- Luise Rainer as Poldi Vogelhuber
- Fernand Gravet as Johann Strauss II
- Miliza Korjus as Carla Donner
- Hugh Herbert as Hofbauer
- Lionel Atwill as Count Hohenfried
- Curt Bois as Kienzl
- Al Shean as Cellist
- Minna Gombell as Mrs. Hofbauer
- Alma Kruger as Mrs. Strauss
- Greta Meyer as Mrs. Vogelhuber
- Bert Roachas Vogelhuber
- Henry Hull as Franz Joseph I of Austria
- Sig Rumann as Wertheimer
- George Houston as Schiller
- Herman Bing as Dommayer
- Christian Rub as Coachman
- Frank Mayo as Ship's Officer (uncredited)
- Larry Steers as Man in Uniform (uncredited)

== Box office ==
According to MGM records, the film earned $918,000 in the US and Canada, and $1,504,000 elsewhere, resulting in a loss of $724,000. At the same time the movie achieved popularity in the USSR where it was shown in cinemas twice, in 1940 and in 1960, in both cases having gathered more than 25 million spectators.

== Re-make ==
The film was re-made in 1972, with Horst Buchholz playing Strauss, alongside Mary Costa, Nigel Patrick, and Yvonne Mitchell.
