= Miliza Korjus =

Polish-Estonian opera singer

- Born: August 18, 1909; Warsaw, Congress Poland
- Died: August 26, 1980; Culver City, California, U.S.
- Resting place: Westwood Memorial Park
- Occupations: Singer and actress
- Years active: 1938–1980
- Spouse(s): Kuno Foelsch (1929-?); Walter Shector
- Children: Melissa F. Wells

Miliza Korjus (August 18, 1909 – August 26, 1980) was a Polish-Estonian lyric coloratura soprano opera singer who appeared in classical American and Mexican sound films during the Golden Age of Hollywood. Korjus became a naturalized United States citizen in her adulthood. She was nominated for the Academy Award for Best Supporting Actress in 1939 for her performance in The Great Waltz.

== Early life ==
Korjus was born in Warsaw, Poland (then part of the Russian Empire), the daughter of Anna (née Gintowt) and Artur Korjus, an Estonian lieutenant colonel in the Imperial Russian Army and later chief of staff to the war minister of independent Estonia. Korjus was the fifth of six children; she had a brother and four sisters. Her mother was descended from the Polish-Lithuanian nobility. Korjus was born in Warsaw during her father's military posting there. Later, the family moved to Moscow. Her parents separated sometime between 1912 and the Russian Revolution of 1917, and in 1918, she moved from Moscow to Kiev with her mother and sisters, where she began her musical training.

== Career ==
As a teenager, Korjus toured the Soviet Union with a dumka choir. In 1927, while performing in Saint Petersburg (then Leningrad), she managed to clandestinely cross the international border and settle in Estonia, where she was reunited with her father. In 1929, she married Kuno Foelsch, a physicist, in Tallinn, Estonia. Korjus continued her concert career as a soprano, touring the Baltic countries and Germany, and was eventually engaged by the Berlin State Opera in 1933. Her operatic appearances and recordings quickly propelled her to the forefront of European singers and earned her the nicknames "The Berlin Nightingale" and "Gorgeous Korjus". Irving Thalberg, head of production at Metro-Goldwyn-Mayer Studios, heard her recordings and signed her to a ten-year film contract, sight unseen. She arrived with her husband and daughter in the U.S. in March 1936. She studied singing with Estelle Liebling in New York City.

Her sole film for MGM was The Great Waltz (1938), which Frank Nugent of The New York Times called "a showcase for Miliza Korjus" while also noting her resemblance to Mae West. She was nominated for the Academy Award for Best Supporting Actress for the role. Korjus was scheduled to star in a film version of the novel Sandor Rozsa in 1940, but an automobile accident caused her leg to be crushed, and although she avoided amputation, she required extensive recuperation, causing the film to be canceled. Her contract with MGM was subsequently terminated.

By 1941, she had healed well enough to begin a tour of Latin America. During the tour, the United States became involved in World War II, and she decided to stay in Mexico for the duration. While living there, she made the Spanish-language film Caballería del Imperio. In 1944, Korjus returned to the United States, where she performed at Carnegie Hall. She toured the country for several more years, eventually settling in Los Angeles, California. She later founded Venus Records to release many of her earlier recordings.

== Personal life ==
In 1929, Miliza Korjus married Kuno Foelsch, a physicist, in Estonia. The couple divorced in the 1940s.

In 1952, she married Walter Shector, a Canadian-born physician, and retired from the concert stage, preferring to concentrate on making records. She died of heart failure in 1980 at Culver City, California. She had two sons, Ernest (born 1943) and Richard (born 1946) and her daughter Melissa Foelsch (later Melissa Wells). Her daughter was born in Estonia in 1932, and served, for more than forty years, as a career officer of the U.S. foreign service. Wells served as U.S. ambassador to Estonia from 1998 to 2001.

== Recordings ==
- Miliza Korjus Collector's Edition: 4-CD set issued by Korjus Recordings. Contains all digitally re-mastered recordings made in Europe and USA, plus live concert performances.
- Miliza Korjus I: arias and excerpts from Die Zauberflöte, Le toréador, La zingara, Lucia di Lammermoor, Ernani, Rigoletto, I vespri siciliani, Mireille, Dinorah, The Tales of Hoffmann, Lakmé, Sadko, The Tsar's Bride, The Golden Cockerel, Proch: Tema e variazioni, CD 89054 (Preiser Lebendige Vergangenheit)
- Miliza Korjus II: arias and excerpts from Die Entführung aus dem Serail, The Barber of Seville, Rigoletto, Lakmé, also songs by Delibes, Moszkowski, Weber, Chopin, Johann Strauss II, Alyabyev, Arditi, Denza, Rossini, Taubert, Muller, Mackeben, CD 89169 (Preiser Lebendige Vergangenheit)
- Miliza Korjus III: arias and excerpts from works by Johann Strauss II, Mozart, Bellini etc. CD 896795 (Preiser Lebendige Vergangenheit)
- Miliza Korjus - The Berlin Nightingale CD 727031918622 (Pearl)
- ’’Vienna in 3/4 Time - Miliza Korjus, Coloratura Soprano with Orchestra’’, LP RCA Camden CAL-427 (1958)

== References and notes ==
Date of birth confirmed by Miliza's daughter, Ambassador Melissa Wells, 11/23/2019.
