= James D. Melville Jr. =

American diplomat (born 1957)

James D. Melville, Jr.
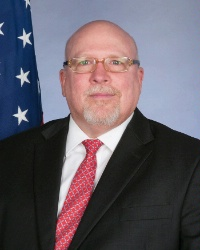

United States Ambassador to Estonia
- In office December 8, 2015 – July 29, 2018
- President: Barack Obama; Donald Trump
- Preceded by: Jeffrey D. Levine
- Succeeded by: George P. Kent (2023)

Personal details
- Born: 1957 (age 68–69)
- Education: Rutgers University; Boston University

James Desmond Melville, Jr. (born 1957) is an American diplomat who has served as the United States Ambassador to Estonia from December 2015 to July 29, 2018, when he resigned as Ambassador, effective on July 29, 2018.

== Career ==
James D. Melville, Jr. graduated from Boston University with an honors degree in history, and from Rutgers University School of Law.

Melville's first Foreign Service assignment was in the U.S. Embassy to the German Democratic Republic from 1986 to 1988. He then served in Seychelles, St. Petersburg, at the U.S. Mission to NATO, and in Paris. In Washington, he worked in Legislative Affairs, as a Senior Watch Officer in the Operations Center, and at the Foreign Service Board of Examiners. From 2008 to 2010 he served as Minister-Counselor for Management Affairs at the Embassy in London. From 2010 to 2012, he served as Executive Director of the Bureaus of European and Eurasian Affairs and International Organization Affairs. As Executive Director of EUR and IO, Ambassador Melville directed support for all of EUR and IO's 79 overseas posts, as well as the domestic requirements for both bureaus.

Melville's most recent position with the State Department was as the Deputy Chief of Mission in the U.S. Embassy Berlin, Germany.

He was nominated by President Obama as the U.S. Ambassador to Estonia on May 7, 2015, and confirmed by the Senate on August 5, 2015. He was sworn in on September 18, 2015. He presented his credentials to President Toomas Hendrik Ilves on December 8, 2015. On June 29, 2018, he resigned as Ambassador over President Donald Trump’s statements in regards to NATO and the European Union, effective on July 29, 2018.

== Personal life ==
Melville is originally from Bradley Beach, New Jersey. Melville speaks Russian, German, and French.
