= Marc Klionsky =

Russian-American artist (1927–2017)

- Марк Клионский
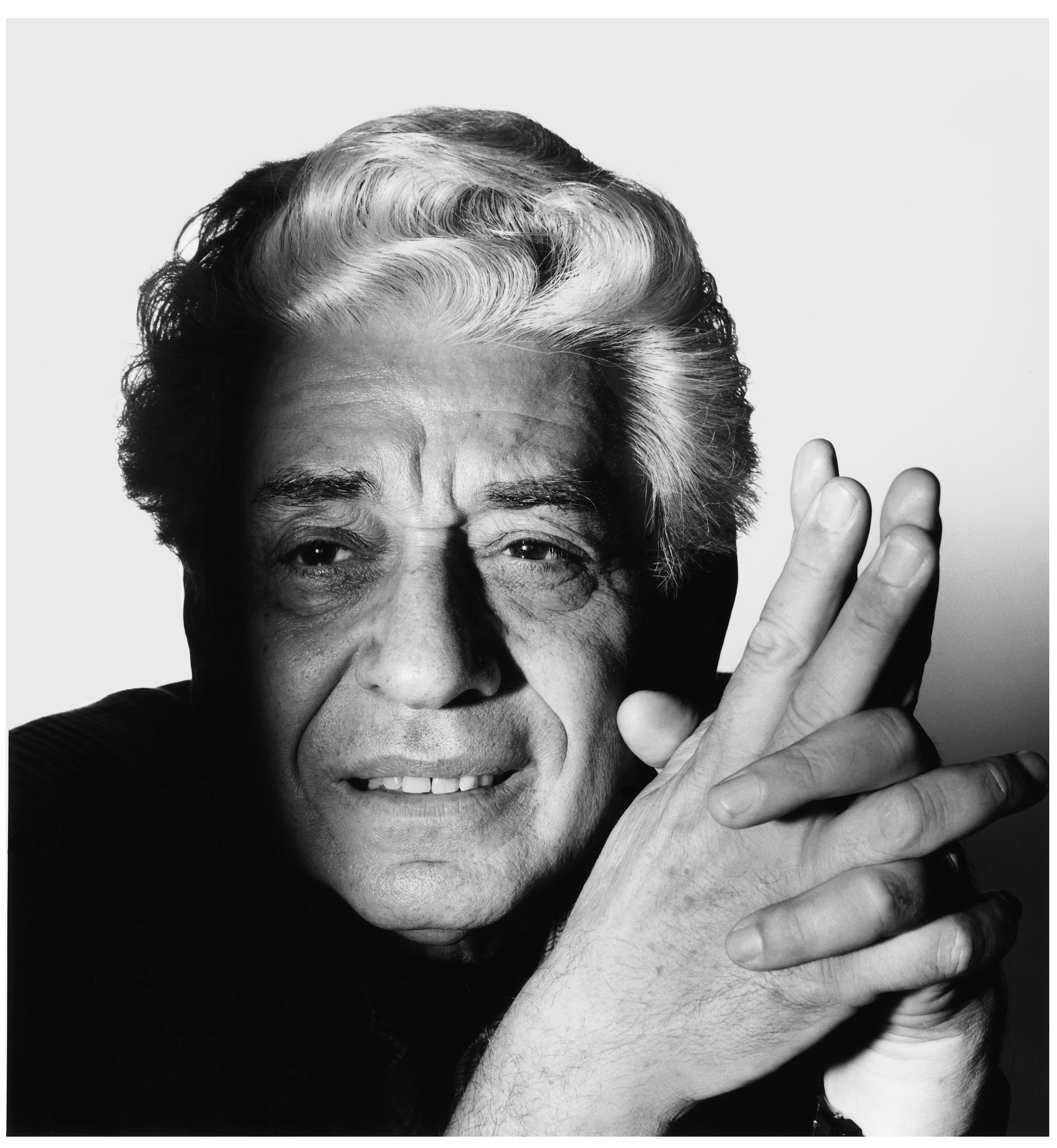
- Born: February 22, 1927; Minsk, Soviet Union (now Belarus), USSR
- Died: September 17, 2017 (aged 90); New York City, United States
- Education: Saint Petersburg Repin Academy of Arts
- Occupation: Painter
- Known for: Painting and printmaking
- Spouse: Irina Klionsky
- Children: Two daughters
- Relatives: Four grandchildren, including Elizabeth Pipko
- Website: https://www.marcklionsky.org

Marc Klionsky (February 22, 1927 – September 17, 2017) was a Russian-American artist who worked in New York City from his immigration in 1974 until his passing in 2017. Klionsky developed a style of American Realism uniquely defined by his classical training in the Soviet Union and his perspective of daily life in New York and America. Over the course of his career, Klionsky painted portraits of prominent world figures who shaped the 20th century. John Russell, art critic for The New York Times, described him as "a good man and a brave man and one of the most eloquent painters around. We need him" and as "one of the best portrait painters around."

== Early life and education ==
Marc Klionsky was born in Minsk, Belarus to a Jewish family in 1927. His father, Leo (Zev Vulf) Klionsky was a printer from Borisov, Belarus. The son of a woodcutter and engraver Klionsky's father moved to Minsk and eventually married Liza (née Rozenstein) in 1926. As a child, Klionsky attended the Art School for Gifted Children in Minsk. During World War II, Klionsky's family was evacuated to Kazan, Republic of Tatarstan, where Klionsky began to earn a living producing anti-Fascist posters and illustrations for local newspapers and other publications. Klionsky studied at the Drama Institute at the Kazan Theater, where he primarily focused on developing costume designs for various productions.

After the war, Klionsky attended first the Serov Art Institute before entering the Ilya Repin Leningrad Institute for Painting, Sculpture and Architecture (now known as the Russian Academy of Arts in Saint Petersburg). Klionsky's diploma piece was reproduced in an edition of 50,000 copies and distributed throughout the USSR. Klionsky received his PhD in 1957, during which period he studied with Professor Boris Ioganson. Klionsky became the youngest artist to be exhibited at the Tretyakov National Gallery in Moscow. During this period, Klionsky met his future wife of nearly 59 years, Irina Klionsky (née Korolik), with whom he had two daughters, Nadia, an artist, and Elena, a pianist.

== Life and career ==
Klionsky established himself in the Soviet Union initially by producing official Social Realist works that depicted political figures and daily life in the Soviet Union. Many decades later in New York City, John Russell would write that Klionsky had "a solid, indestructible professional formation of the kind that was customary in Russia before 1917 and can still sometimes be found there today." However, in the privacy of his own studio, Klionsky began to explore the themes of Jewish life, anti-Semitism and the Holocaust. He soon discovered the creative and intellectual restrictions of working as a Jewish artist in the Soviet Union.

After Klionsky left the Soviet Union with his family in 1974, traveling first to Rome and then to New York, he expressed in his work the newborn freedom that he found in America. Shortly after his arrival, he was recognized in an ABC television production about his work, Canvases of Freedom. This was followed by a U.S. State Department documentary (produced by the U.S. Information Agency) shown in ninety-two countries about one of his exhibitions at Hammer Galleries.

During this period, Klionsky also taught at the School of Visual Arts in New York and at the Pennsylvania Academy of Fine Arts in Philadelphia, birthplace of the Ashcan School of American Realism.

While Klionsky took advantage of his creative freedom in the United States to explore a range of abstract styles and media, he ultimately gained prominence as a master of portrait painting and of American Realism. His works include portraits of leaders in the world of politics and humanitarianism, such as Golda Meir, Elie Wiesel, Prince Bandar Bin Sultan, and Vernon Jordan; music, including Dizzy Gillespie, Mstislav Rostropovich, and B.B. King; business leaders Armand Hammer, Steve Forbes, and Dwayne Andreas; and many others. His portraits are in the permanent collections of the National Portrait Gallery in Washington, D.C., the Russian Museum in St. Petersburg, and the Museum of Contemporary Art in Lausanne, Switzerland. Klionsky was also honored during his lifetime to have been selected to sculpt the Nobel Peace Prize Commemorative Medal for Elie Wiesel.

== Works and exhibitions ==
During his lifetime, Marc Klionsky's paintings and prints were exhibited throughout the Soviet Union, Europe, America, and Asia, as well as Australia and New Zealand. His Soviet works were exhibited in the Tretyakov National Gallery in Moscow and the State Russian Museum in Leningrad multiple times throughout the 1950s. In 1962, his work was shown alongside that of Marc Chagall at Grosvenor Gallery in London. Separately, his work was shown along with other Soviet artists at the time in West Berlin, Hiroshima, Rome, and New York.

After emigrating to New York in 1974, his first international exhibition was held in Paris at the Salon des Reprouves with Galleries Hardy in 1978. His first solo New York show took place a Nakhamkin Fine Arts Gallery on Madison Avenue in 1979, after which Klionsky was represented by Hammer Galleries for the remainder of his career.

Klionsky had several solo shows in Europe between 1991 and 1992, showing at the Musée d’Art Contemporain in Lausanne, Switzerland, the Salon Internationale des Musées at the Grand Palais in Paris, France, and his "God Bless America" traveling retrospective that began at the St. Ingbert Museum in Germany. The last exhibition of Klionsky's work during his lifetime was at an event titled "Painting the Face of Russian Jewry: The Art and Journey of Marc Klionsky” at Brandeis University in Waltham, Massachusetts in 2010, with presentations made by Sir Antony Polonsky, Emeritus Professor of Holocaust Studies, and Professor Nancy Scott, former chair of the Fine Arts department at Brandeis University.

== Legacy ==
Let the art historians or critics speak about Marc's art, his talent as the portrait painter, and his gifts as an innovator. Let them explain how he strives to unite present and past, colors and memories. As one who loves stories, I love those which he shows to make us smile, weep, or dream.

– Elie Wiesel (1928–2016)

Marc Klionsky's works hang in the collections of the National Portrait Gallery in Washington, D.C., The Elie Wiesel Foundation for Humanity in New York, the Musée d’Art Contemporain in Lausanne, Switzerland, the Yad Vashem Art Museum in Jerusalem, Israel, and the State Hermitage Museum and the State Russian Museum in St. Petersburg, Russia, among other private and public collections internationally.

A book on the life and art of Marc Klionsky by John Russell and Nicholas Fox Weber was published in 2004, with a foreword by Elie Wiesel.

The Marc Klionsky Estate has created an archive and collection of his works and materials in his SoHo studio in New York City.

== Portraits ==
- Prince Bandar Bin Sultan
- Ruth Dayan
- Dr. Hans Deutsch
- Steve Forbes
- Abraham Foxman
- Dizzie Gillespie
- Armand Hammer
- Victor Hammer
- Vernon Jordan
- B. B. King
- Teddy Kollek
- Golda Meir
- Mstislav Rostropovich
- Harrison Salisbury
- Rabbi Adin Steinsaltz
- Elie Wiesel
- Sam Wyly
