= Clare H. Timberlake =

American diplomat

Clare Hayes Timberlake
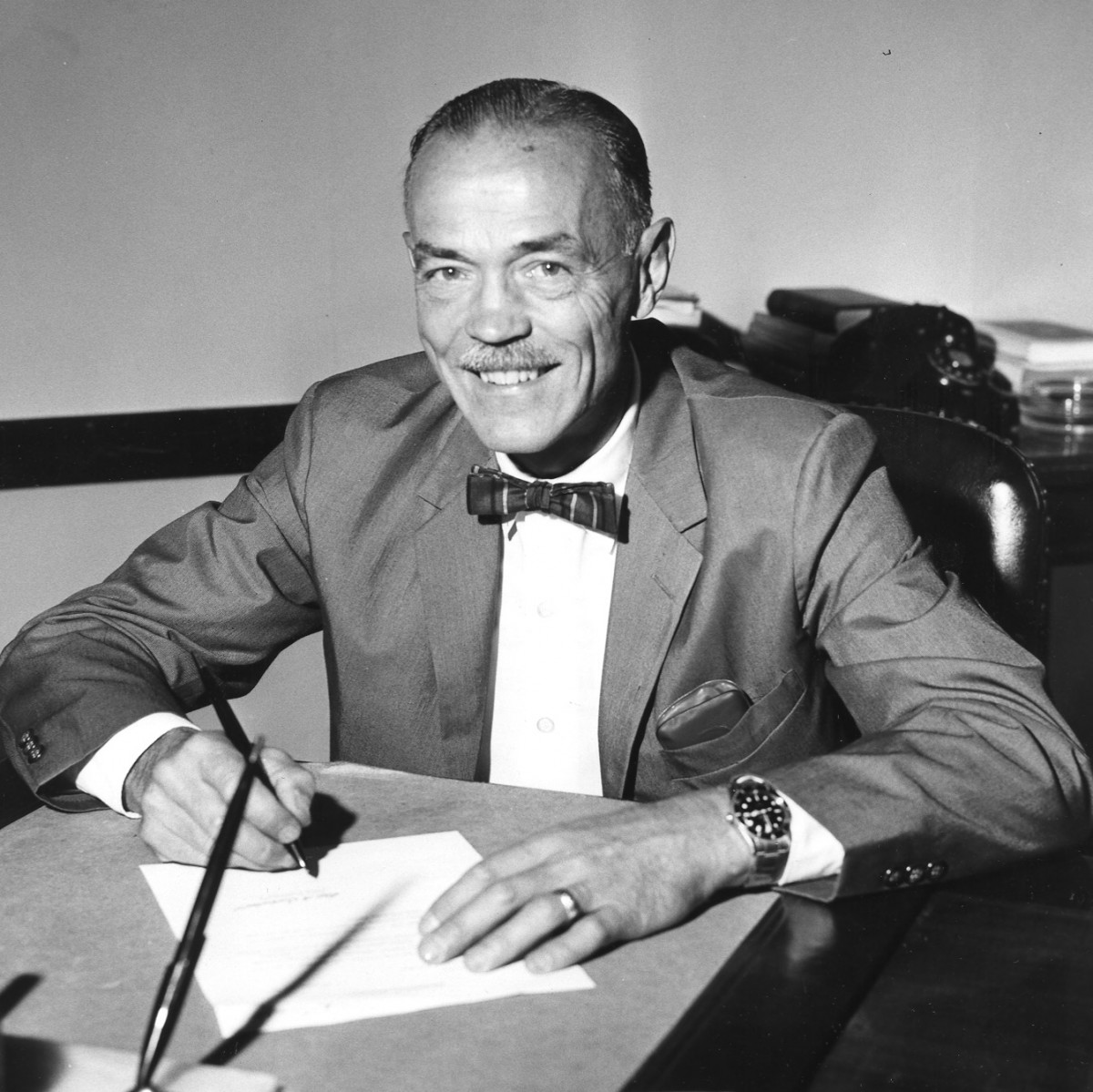

United States Ambassador to the Democratic Republic of the Congo
- In office July 5, 1960 – June 15, 1961
- President: Dwight D. Eisenhower; John F. Kennedy
- Succeeded by: Edmund A. Gullion

Personal details
- Born: October 29, 1907 Jackson, Michigan
- Died: February 22, 1982 (aged 74) Bethesda, Maryland
- Spouse: Julia Frances Meehan
- Children: Charles; William; Frances; Katherine; Mary Anne
- Education: University of Michigan; George Washington University

Clare Hayes Timberlake (October 29, 1907 – February 22, 1982) was an American diplomat and career Foreign Service Officer who served as the first United States Ambassador to the Democratic Republic of the Congo and later as special assistant to the Under Secretary of State for Political Affairs and as a member of the Board of Examiners of the Foreign Service. He served in the Department of State for forty years and held diplomatic posts in Canada, Latin America, Europe, and Asia throughout his career.

== Early life and education ==
Clare Timberlake was born in Jackson, Michigan on October 29, 1907, the son of Wilbur and Dorothy. He studied at the University of Michigan, before studying law at Harvard. He eventually earned a master's degree from George Washington University.

== Diplomatic career ==
Timberlake joined the United States Foreign Service in 1930 after leaving Harvard University and was posted first to the U.S. consulate in Toronto, Ontario, Canada as vice consul. He remained in this posting for one year, before being assigned as vice consul in Buenos Aires, Argentina. After leaving Argentina, he served as third secretary in Uruguay, and Zürich. Hayes was serving in Spain during the Spanish Civil War in the northwestern city of Vigo until 1940. After brief postings in Aden and French Somaliland he returned to Washington and headed the State Department's Division of African Affairs. In 1948, Hayes became U.S. consul in Bombay. He would later become Consul General in Hamburg and Deputy Chief of Mission in Bonn in the 1950s.

In 1960, President Dwight D. Eisenhower appointed Timberlake to the position of first U.S. Ambassador to the newly independent Democratic Republic of the Congo, a former Belgian colony. During the Congo Crisis, Hayes was a vocal supporter of Mobutu Sese Seko, and advocated the deposition of Patrice Lumumba. In March 1961, Hayes personally ordered five U.S. Navy vessels into the waters off the Congo, a move that caught the Kennedy administration off guard.

In 1961, Timberlake's stint in the Congo came to an end after President Kennedy recalled him from Leopoldville as he was viewed as a relic of Eisenhower-era policy. He was sent to Maxwell Air Force Base in Alabama to serve as State Department liaison officer, a position viewed as a demotion. He later chaired the advisory committee of the Arms Control and Disarmament Agency and then became U.S. permanent representative to the Conference of the Committee on Disarmament in Geneva. After serving on the Foreign Service Board of Examiners, Hayes retired in 1970.

== Later life and death ==
Timberlake was president of the Greater Washington Chapter of the Leukemia Society of America from 1971 to 1974. He died in 1982 in a nursing home in Bethesda, Maryland after suffering an aneurysm at the age of 74.

== See also ==
- Congo Crisis
- Sheldon B. Vance
- William Garvelink
