= William C. Harrop =

American diplomat (1929–2025)

William Harrop
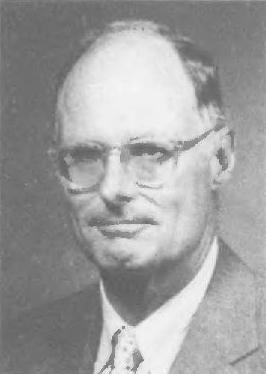
- Harrop in 1991

United States Ambassador to Israel
- In office January 21, 1992 – May 7, 1993
- President: George H. W. Bush; Bill Clinton
- Preceded by: William Brown
- Succeeded by: Edward Djerejian

United States Ambassador to Zaire
- In office January 28, 1988 – May 18, 1991
- President: Ronald Reagan; George H. W. Bush
- Preceded by: Brandon Grove
- Succeeded by: Melissa F. Wells

12th Inspector General of the Department of State
- In office December 12, 1983 – August 27, 1986; Acting: December 12, 1983 – August 16, 1985
- President: Ronald Reagan
- Preceded by: Robert Brown
- Succeeded by: Sherman M. Funk

United States Ambassador to the Seychelles
- In office August 26, 1980 – September 22, 1983
- President: Jimmy Carter; Ronald Reagan
- Preceded by: Wilbert Le Melle
- Succeeded by: Gerald Thomas

United States Ambassador to Kenya
- In office July 10, 1980 – September 1, 1983
- President: Jimmy Carter; Ronald Reagan
- Preceded by: Wilbert Le Melle
- Succeeded by: Gerald Thomas

United States Ambassador to Guinea-Conakry
- In office May 29, 1975 – July 15, 1977
- President: Gerald Ford; Jimmy Carter
- Preceded by: Terence Todman
- Succeeded by: Mike Crosby

Personal details
- Born: William Caldwell Harrop; February 19, 1929 Baltimore, Maryland, U.S.
- Died: June 6, 2025 (aged 96)
- Education: Harvard University (BA); University of Missouri (MA)

Military service
- Allegiance: United States
- Branch: U.S. Marine Corps
- Conflict: Korean War

William Caldwell Harrop (February 19, 1929 – June 6, 2025) was an American diplomat. Harrop served for 39 years as a Foreign Service Officer, with postings as United States ambassador to Guinea, Kenya and the Seychelles, the Congo (Kinshasa), and Israel.

== Early life and education ==
Harrop was born in Baltimore, Maryland, on February 19, 1929. At age ten, he moved with his family to New Brunswick, New Jersey, where his father, a research physician, worked for E. R. Squibb & Sons. Harrop attended Deerfield Academy in Deerfield, Massachusetts. He received his A.B. from Harvard College in 1950.

After graduating from Harvard, Harrop unsuccessfully looked for editorial work with various newspapers. At the invitation of Frank Boyden, the headmaster of Deerfield Academy, Harrop spent about five months teaching at the school before entering the Marine Corps, in which he served during the Korean War.

After returning to the United States, Harrop took and passed the Foreign Service exam in 1952. At the time, Harrop was still interested in journalism, and used the G.I. Bill to earn a master's degree in journalism from the University of Missouri School of Journalism in Columbia, Missouri. Harrop then accepted an appointment to the United States Foreign Service; according to an oral history given by Harrop, he "was one of a considerable group of people who were delayed in entering the Foreign Service for a couple of years by Senator Joseph McCarthy." According to Harrop, "Accepting the appointment was a difficult decision for me. I had heard nothing from the Department for months, and was suddenly told over the phone that if I would appear within nine days in Washington I would receive an appointment and would go to Palermo."

== Foreign Service career ==
Harrop entered the Foreign Service in a year when the new class of diplomats did not attend the standard A-100 orientation and training course at the Foreign Service Institute. One of Harrop's sons was born the day before he left for Italy for his first assignment, at the U.S. consulate general in Palermo, Sicily in 1953. This consulate would have ordinarily had only twelve staffers, but because of the Refugee Relief Act had exploded to at least eighty staffers. Harrop was one of several vice consuls there. He helped administer the Refugee Relief Program on the island, where at the time the Mafia held great sway.

Harrop served in Palermo from 1954 to October 1955, when he was transferred to the U.S. Embassy in Rome to be assistant commercial attaché there under Ambassador Clare Boothe Luce and, later, James David Zellerbach. Harrop left Rome to return to Washington in the late fall of 1958. According to Harrop's oral history years later, "I came back under protest because by that time I had become fascinated with energy questions and with the politics of energy -- atomic energy particularly. I was asked to come back to be in the Office of Personnel in the State Department, handling personnel assignments. I sent back an imprudent cable to say that if I had wanted to be in personnel work I would have joined Westinghouse, not the State Department. ... I was told in no uncertain terms that if I wanted to continue my career in the State Department, I should come back and work in Personnel. So I did." At the Office of Personnel, Harrop was initially a placement officer and later deputy director of the Office of Washington Assignments. Around 1961, Harrop left Personnel and moved to the regional affairs office of the Bureau of European Affairs, where he replaced Arthur A. Hartman as a desk officer focused on EURATOM.

In early 1962, Harrop was transferred (at Sheldon B. Vance's request) to the Bureau of African Affairs, where he was responsible for economic matters in the Congo (then in the midst of the Cold War-era Congo Crisis) and the Katanga secession. In 1963, Harrop went to Brussels to become a mid-grade economic officer and deputy to the Economic Counselor there. In Brussels, Harrop served under ambassadors Douglas MacArthur II and later Ridgway Knight; he continued to follow African matters and did work relating to Belgian commerce. In 1966, Harrop left Brussels and went to the Congo, spent two years as principal officer at the U.S. consulate in Lubumbashi (the name of which had recently changed from Elisabethville). The region was extremely dangerous at the time; Harrop would arrange for C-130s to be flown down to Katanga during the period of greatest tension. In 1968, Harrop left the Congo after being assigned to do graduate work for a year at the Woodrow Wilson School of Public and International Affairs at Princeton University as part of a "Mid Career Program" sabbatical.

Harrop returned in Washington, D.C. to become director of Regional African Affairs at the State Department's Bureau of Intelligence Research, serving there from 1969 to 1971, under Ray S. Cline, then the assistant secretary for intelligence and research. Harrop also became involved in State Department personnel matters; he was elected to a position on the board of the American Foreign Service Association, and later became chairman, taking a yearlong leave without pay from the State Department in the year 1971. Harrop then returned to the Department of State in 1972–1973 to join the Policy Planning Council. Harrop left Policy Planning when he was chosen by U.S. Ambassador to Australia Marshall Green to serve as deputy chief of mission (DCM) in Canberra. Harrop served as DCM in Australia from 1973 to 1975.

Harrop returned to the U.S. and was on home leave when he was appointed U.S. Ambassador to Guinea. Harrop served in this post from May 29, 1975, to July 15, 1977. As ambassador in Conakry, Guinea, Harrop faced hostility from President Ahmed Sékou Touré, leader of a radical, pan-Africanist movement. Harrop's twelve-member mission was also dramatically outnumbered by the Soviet mission, which had 1200 people, and the Chinese mission, which had 700 people. Key issues handled during Harrop's tenure in Conakry were Soviet overflights and bases in the country and U.S. humanitarian aid in Guinea. In 1977, Harrop left Guinea and returned to the Bureau of African Affairs to become principal deputy to Assistant Secretary of State for African Affairs Richard M. Moose. At the Bureau of African Affairs, Harrop spent most time of issues relating to Zaire and the Horn of Africa (particularly the Ogaden War between Ethiopia and Somalia), while Moose handled most matters relating to southern Africa (South Africa, Rhodesia, Namibia, and Angola).

Harrop left the Bureau of African Affairs in 1980 and became U.S. Ambassador to Kenya, serving from July 10, 1980, to September 1, 1983. (Harrop concurrently served as U.S. Ambassador to the Seychelles, from August 26, 1980, to September 22, 1983). Kenya was then led by President Daniel arap Moi. Key issues dealt with by Harrop in this position include the application of the Foreign Corrupt Practices Act to U.S. commercial ventures in Kenya; the use of Kenyan coasts by U.S. Navy ships; territorial disputes between Kenya and Somalia, Ethiopia, Uganda, and Tanzania; and human rights in the country.

Harrop returned to Washington to become Inspector General of the Department of State and the Foreign Service, serving from December 12, 1983, to August 27, 1986. Harrop was part of a group of three diplomats appointed by Secretary of State George P. Shultz as part of a new "management team," the others being Ronald I. Spiers (Under Secretary for Management) and Alfred (Roy) Atherton (Director General of the Foreign Service). As inspector general, Harrop reformed the office's investigative and auditing functions and oversaw investigations relating to allegations of corruption and sexual harassment. Harrop oversaw investigations related to Faith Whittlesey, ambassador to Switzerland. He also clashed with Senator Jesse Helms, who Harrop stated in a later oral history was "determined to destroy the institution of the Inspector General of the Foreign Service" and carried out a "relentless campaign against career Foreign Service professionals."

While Harrop insisted on treating this as some personal vendetta by Senator Helms, the reality is that the Helms amendment was fully supported by the entire Committee on Foreign Relations, as well as the House Foreign Affairs and Government Operations committees. In 1982, the GAO had issued a report pointing out that an Inspector General who was a Foreign Service officer seeking an onward assignment and who was, like Harrop, a key participant in management decisions lacked the requisite independence to meet US Government standards to conduct audits and investigations. The GAO quoted a member of Harrop's own staff who told the GAO "'the name of the game' in the IG office is making contacts to try to get a good assignment after leaving that office. It was his opinion that, as a result, no one in the IG office wants to push big problems through the system because it would be like 'shooting yourself in the foot' (that is, jeopardizing your chances of getting a good assignment after the IG tour)." GAO, State Department’s Office of Inspector General Should Be More Independent and Effective, AFMD-83-56 (Washington, D.C.: June 2, 1982).

One sees the problem in Harrop's subsequent career. He lobbied hard for another ambassadorship and was rewarded when he was recommended as the next ambassador to Zaire. He served from January 28, 1988, to May 18, 1991. Harrop's confirmation was difficult, as U.S. policy in Congo was highly controversial and Helms placed a hold on Harrop's nomination. After finally being confirmed, Harrop went to Kinshasa, then dominated by General Mobutu Sese Seko.

After returning to the United States, Harrop was informed that he was one of the candidates for Pakistan or Israel. Eventually, Harrop was appointed ambassador to Israel, his final posting; Harrop succeeded William Andreas Brown in the post. He served from January 21, 1992, to May 7, 1993. Important events during Harrop's tenure included the Dotan affair, the recognition of the PLO by Israel for the first time, and the beginning of the talks that led to the Oslo I Accord.

== Post-retirement ==
In 2004, Harrop was among 27 retired diplomats and military commanders who publicly said the administration of President George W. Bush did not understand the world and was unable to handle "in either style or substance" the responsibilities of global leadership. On June 16, 2004, the Diplomats and Military Commanders for Change issued a statement against the Iraq War.

Harrop was a member of the Washington Institute of Foreign Affairs and a director of the American Academy of Diplomacy, the Senior Living Foundation of the American Foreign Service, American Diplomacy Publishers, the Henry L. Stimson Center, and the Washington Humane Society. For a time, Harrop was chair of the Board of Directors of the Diplomacy Center Foundation (formerly known as the Foreign Affairs Museum Council), which aims to establish a museum of U.S. diplomacy. He continued to serve on the board until his death.

Harrop was for eight years the president of the Spring Valley-Wesley Heights Citizens Association in the District of Columbia.

Harrop received the 2015 Lifetime Contributions to American Diplomacy Award of the American Foreign Service Association (AFSA).

Harrop was one of five former U.S. ambassadors to Israel from administrations of both parties (and two additional former Under Secretaries of State) to sign a letter in July 2015 calling upon Congress to approve the Joint Comprehensive Plan of Action, a comprehensive nuclear agreement, with Iran.

== Personal life and death ==
Harrop was married to Ann Harrop (née Delavan); they had four sons and nine grandchildren. Ann died in 2022. He spoke French and Italian.

Harrop died on June 6, 2025, at the age of 96.

Diplomatic posts
Preceded by Terence Todman	United States Ambassador to Guinea-Conakry; 1975–1977	Succeeded by Mike Crosby
Preceded by Wilbert Le Melle	United States Ambassador to Kenya; 1980–1983	Succeeded by Gerald Thomas
Preceded by Wilbert Le Melle	United States Ambassador to the Seychelles; 1980–1983	Succeeded by Gerald Thomas
Preceded by Brandon Grove	United States Ambassador to the Congo-Kinshasa; 1988–1991	Succeeded by Melissa F. Wells
Preceded by William Brown	United States Ambassador to Israel; 1992–1993	Succeeded by Edward Djerejian
