= The Princeton University Summer Journalism Program =

The Princeton University Summer Journalism Program (SJP) is a summer program at Princeton University for high school seniors across the country from low-income backgrounds. It was founded in 2002 by four former editors of The Daily Princetonian, the university's daily student newspaper.

The program is highly selective and open to outstanding students interested in journalism. Since it was founded, the program has graduated more than 530 alumni, some of whom have received jobs or internships at The New York Times, Newsweek, The Miami Herald, The New York Daily News, The Dallas Morning News, The Star-Ledger, NBC and CBS, among other outlets.

== History ==
The Princeton University Summer Journalism Program was founded under the name "The Daily Princeton Class of 2001 Summer Journalism Program" in recognition of the founding of the program by 'Prince' editors from the Class of 2001. In 2006, it partnered with Princeton University and was renamed.

The creation of the program was sparked by a series the paper wrote about race on campus, the final one examining diversity within the newsroom at The Daily Princetonian.

In 2020, 2021, and 2022, the program was hosted entirely virtually due to the COVID-19 pandemic. Since 2023, the program has been hosted in a hybrid format; students complete a multi-week series of online workshops and then participate in a ten-day residential experience on Princeton's campus.
