= List of ambassadors of the United States to the Democratic Republic of the Congo =

Ambassador of the United States to the Democratic Republic of the Congo
- Seal of the United States Department of State

- Flag of a United States ambassador

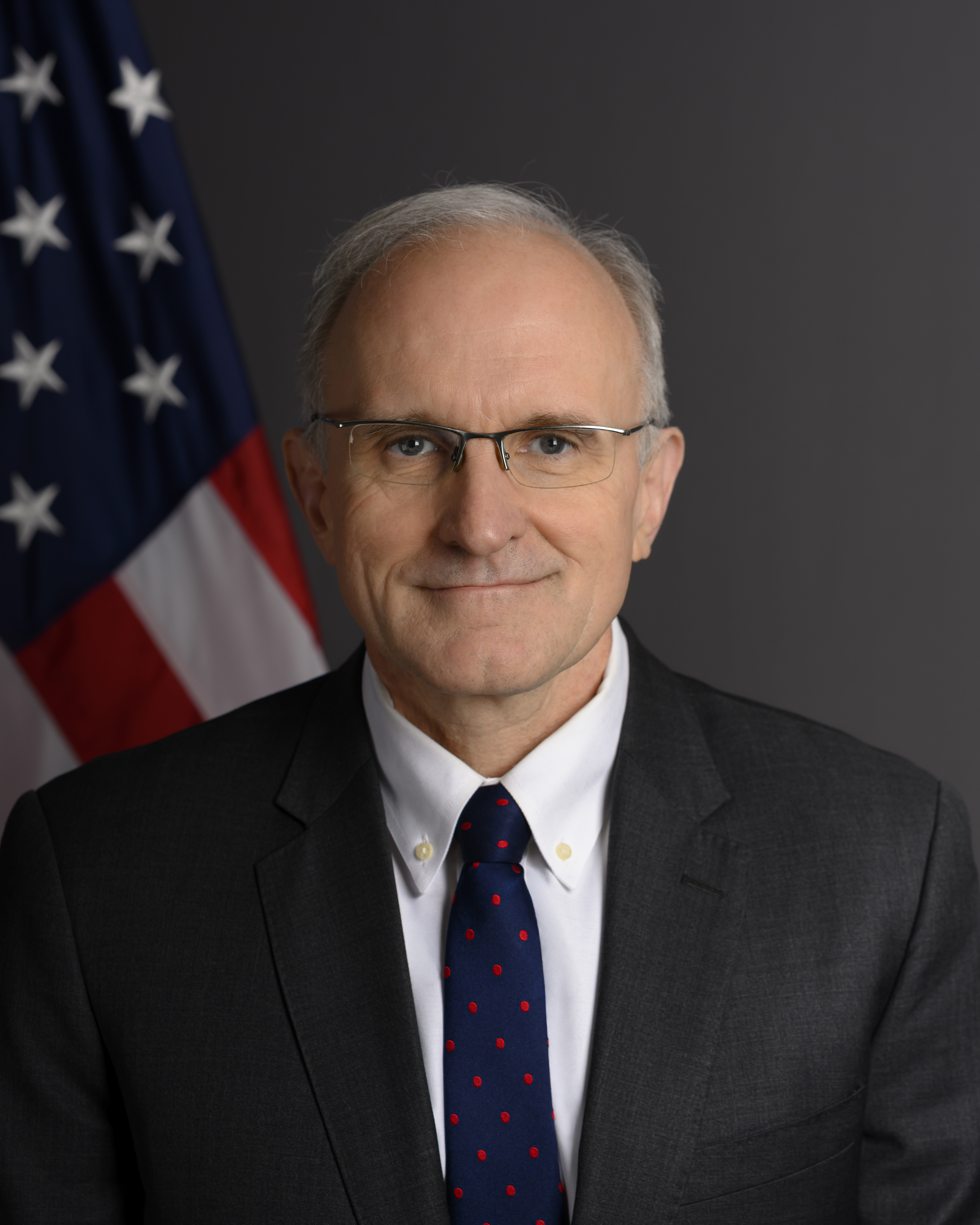
- Incumbent; Ian J. McCary; Chargé d'affaires since January 20, 2026
- Nominator: The president of the United States
- Appointer: The president with Senate advice and consent
- Inaugural holder: Clare H. Timberlake as Ambassador Extraordinary and Plenipotentiary
- Formation: July 5, 1960
- Website: U.S. Embassy - Kinshasa

This is a list of ambassadors of the United States to the Democratic Republic of the Congo.

From 1877 until 1960, the republic had been a colony of Belgium, first under the name Congo Free State and then Belgian Congo.

The Congo was granted its independence on June 30, 1960, adopting the name “Republic of the Congo” (République du Congo). As the French colony of Middle Congo (Moyen-Congo) also chose the name Republic of Congo upon receiving its independence, the two countries were more commonly known as Congo-Léopoldville and Congo-Brazzaville, after their capital cities.

The United States immediately recognized the new Republic of the Congo and moved to establish diplomatic relations. The embassy in Léopoldville (now Kinshasa) was established on June 30, 1960, with John D. Tomlinson as Chargé d'Affaires ad interim. The first ambassador, Clare H. Timberlake was appointed on July 5, 1960.

In 1971, President Joseph-Désiré Mobutu changed the country’s official name to Zaire.

In 1997, President Laurent Kabila restored the name "Democratic Republic of the Congo", previously used from 1964 to 1971.

== Ambassadors ==
Name	Title	Appointed	Presented credentials	Terminated mission	Notes
Clare H. Timberlake – Career FSO	Ambassador Extraordinary and Plenipotentiary	July 5, 1960	July 25, 1960	June 15, 1961	
Edmund A. Gullion – Career FSO	Ambassador Extraordinary and Plenipotentiary	August 3, 1961	September 11, 1961	February 20, 1964	
G. McMurtrie Godley – Career FSO	Ambassador Extraordinary and Plenipotentiary	February 20, 1964	March 23, 1964	October 15, 1966	
Robert H. McBride – Career FSO	Ambassador Extraordinary and Plenipotentiary	May 10, 1967	June 29, 1967	May 16, 1969	
Sheldon B. Vance – Career FSO	Ambassador Extraordinary and Plenipotentiary	May 27, 1969	June 28, 1969	March 26, 1974	
Deane R. Hinton – Career FSO	Ambassador Extraordinary and Plenipotentiary	June 20, 1974	August 21, 1974	June 21, 1975	
Walter L. Cutler – Career FSO	Ambassador Extraordinary and Plenipotentiary	November 20, 1975	December 23, 1975	May 9, 1979	
Robert B. Oakley – Career FSO	Ambassador Extraordinary and Plenipotentiary	November 6, 1979	November 28, 1979	August 22, 1982	
Peter Dalton Constable – Career FSO	Ambassador Extraordinary and Plenipotentiary	September 30, 1982	October 18, 1982	August 31, 1984	
Brandon Hambright Grove, Jr. – Career FSO	Ambassador Extraordinary and Plenipotentiary	August 13, 1984	September 18, 1984	September 18, 1987	
William Caldwell Harrop – Career FSO	Ambassador Extraordinary and Plenipotentiary	December 18, 1987	January 28, 1988	May 18, 1991	
Melissa Foelsch Wells – Career FSO	Ambassador Extraordinary and Plenipotentiary	April 25, 1991	June 11, 1991	March 21, 1992	
John M. Yates	Chargé d'Affaires ad interim	March 21, 1992	Unknown	September 1995	
Roger A. Meece	Chargé d'Affaires ad interim	September 1995	Unknown	November 23, 1995	
Daniel H. Simpson – Career FSO	Ambassador Extraordinary and Plenipotentiary	October 3, 1995	November 23, 1995	June 11, 1998	
William Lacy Swing – Career FSO	Ambassador Extraordinary and Plenipotentiary	August 11, 1998	October 13, 1998	August 11, 2001	
Aubrey Hooks – Career FSO	Ambassador Extraordinary and Plenipotentiary	July 12, 2001	September 4, 2001	April 17, 2004	
Roger A. Meece – Career FSO	Ambassador Extraordinary and Plenipotentiary	May 14, 2004	August 3, 2004	August 14, 2007	
William J. Garvelink – Career FSO	Ambassador Extraordinary and Plenipotentiary	July 2, 2007	November 29, 2007	May 10, 2010	
Samuel C. Laeuchli - Career FSO	Chargé d'Affaires ad interim	August 2010	Unknown	November 4, 2010	
James F. Entwistle - Career FSO	Ambassador Extraordinary and Plenipotentiary	August 8, 2010	November 4, 2010	August 10, 2013	
James C. Swan - Career FSO	Ambassador Extraordinary and Plenipotentiary	August 6, 2013	November 1, 2013	December 31, 2016	
Michael A. Hammer - Career FSO	Ambassador Extraordinary and Plenipotentiary	September 6, 2018	December 22, 2018	June 1, 2022	
Lucy Tamlyn - Career FSO	Ambassador Extraordinary and Plenipotentiary	December 20, 2022	February 6, 2023	December 31, 2025	
Susan Teller - Career FSO	Chargé d'Affaires ad interim	January 1, 2026		January 20, 2026	
Ian J. McCary - Career FSO	Chargé d'Affaires ad interim	January 20, 2026		Present	

== See also ==
- Democratic Republic of the Congo – United States relations
- Foreign relations of the Democratic Republic of the Congo
- Ambassadors from the United States
