= Roger A. Meece =

American diplomat

Roger Allen Meece
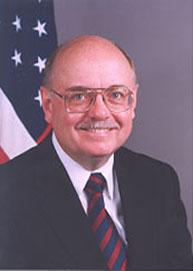

United States Ambassador to the Democratic Republic of the Congo
- In office August 3, 2004 – August 14, 2007
- President: George W. Bush
- Preceded by: Aubrey Hooks
- Succeeded by: William J. Garvelink

United States Ambassador to Malawi
- In office November 7, 2000 – July 20, 2003
- President: George W. Bush
- Preceded by: Amelia Ellen Shippy
- Succeeded by: Steven A. Browning

Personal details
- Born: 1949 (age 76–77) Indianapolis, Indiana
- Profession: Diplomat

Roger Allen Meece (born 1949) is an American diplomat. He has served as United States ambassador to Malawi (2000–2003) and Democratic Republic of the Congo (2004–2007), as well as Charge d'affairs to Nigeria (2003) and to Ethiopia (2009). His last diplomatic appointment was as head the United Nations mission (MONUSCO) in the Democratic Republic of Congo from 2010 to 2013. After this appointment, Meece retired from diplomatic positions.

== Biography ==
Roger Meece was born in Indianapolis, Indiana in 1949. He graduated with a B.A. in mathematics from Michigan State University in 1971, and attended the National Defense College of Canada for one year.

Before joining the Foreign Service, Meece served extensively in Africa, beginning as a Peace Corps Volunteer in Sierra Leone in the early 1970s. He subsequently worked in Peace Corps assignments in Washington, D.C., Niger, Cameroon, and the Republic of the Congo (Brazzaville), culminating with an appointment as the Peace Corps Country Director in Gabon.

== Career ==
Meece joined the State Department in 1979. His early assignments included postings to the United States embassies in Cameroon (1979–1981) and in Malawi (1981–1984). He later served in more senior roles, including posts such as Deputy Chief of Mission in Brazzaville (Republic of Congo) and Kinshasa (Democratic Republic of Congo), and as Consul General in Halifax (Nova Scotia, Canada). In Washington, Meece has served in the Bureau of International Narcotics Matters (1986–1988), on detail to the Office of the Vice President, and as Director for Central African Affairs (1998–2000) at the State Department. In 2004 he was briefly diplomat-in-residence at Florida International University. Meece's State Department career culminated with his two ambassadorships during the 2000s. Mostly notably, he played a central role in leading the international community efforts to help the Congolese government organize the free elections of 2006 in the Democratic Republic of Congo.

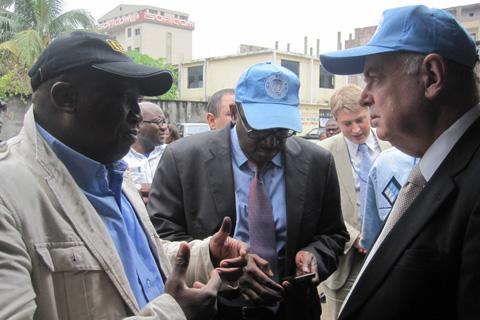
Meece (on the right) speaks with election officials in the DRC, 2011.

After his retirement from the U.S. State Department, Meece was appointed by the United Nations Secretary-General Ban Ki-moon as his Special Representative for the Democratic Republic of the Congo and Head of the United Nations Organization Stabilization Mission in the Democratic Republic of the Congo(MONUSCO) on 9 June 2010. He replaced Alan Doss of the United Kingdom in this role. The Secretary-General informed the Security Council of his decision in a letter dated 7 June. In accordance with Security Council resolution 1925 (2010), adopted on 28 May, MONUC will bear the title of MONUSCO, beginning on 1 July (2010). Meece arrived in Kinshasa to take up this new role on July 17, 2010.

He is fluent in French as well as native English. His American residence is in Seattle, Washington.

Diplomatic posts
Preceded by Aubrey Hooks	United States Ambassador to DR Congo; 2004–2007	Succeeded by William Garvelink
Preceded by Amelia Ellen Shippy	United States Ambassador to Malawi; 2000–2003	Succeeded by Steven A. Browning
