= Anita Kiki Gbeho =

Ghanaian United Nations official

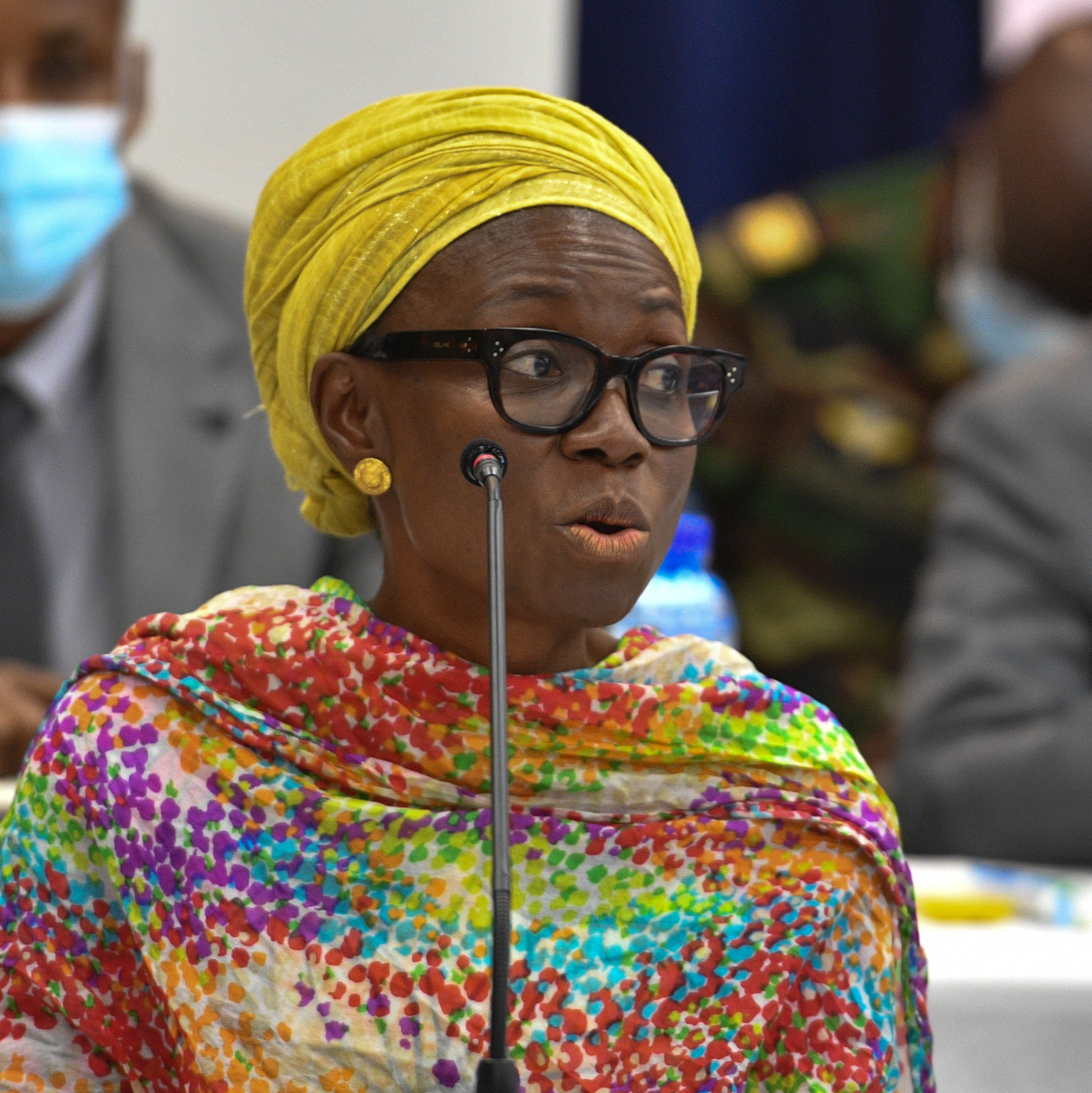
- Gbeho in 2022
- Born: 1964 (age 61–62); Accra, Ghana
- Education: Stony Brook University, University of Ghana
- Occupations: Special Representative of the United Nations Secretary-General and Head of the United Nations Mission in South Sudan
- Employer: United Nations
- Predecessor: Nicholas Haysom

Anita Kiki Gbeho (born 1964) is a Ghanaian United Nations official who has served as Special Representative of the United Nations Secretary-General and Head of the United Nations Mission in South Sudan since 2026, having previously served as Deputy Special Representative since 2023.

== Early life and education ==
Gbeho was born in Accra, Ghana. Her father, V. C. Gbeho, was Ghana's Permanent Representative to the United Nations.

She attended the State University of New York at Stony Brook, graduating with a Bachelor of Arts in Social Sciences and African Studies. She then took a master's degree in international relations at the University of Ghana.

== Career ==
In 1998 she was an Information Officer in Sudan before she started two years of work with the World Food Programme in 2000.

Gbeho has worked with partners in conflict and post-conflict environments in Cambodia, Iraq and in Africa in Namibia, Angola, Sudan and Somalia. She has worked In New York as the Head of Section at the United Nations Office for the Coordination of Humanitarian Affairs (OCHA) and she has led OCHA's work in Somalia and South Sudan. Gbeho organised humanitarian help during the transition of South Sudan.

Between 2015 and 2016 she was the Resident Coordinator and Representative of the United Nations Development Program (UNDP) in Namibia. In 2018 Gbeho became Deputy Joint Special Envoy for the African Union-United Nations Hybrid Operation in Darfur (UNAMID), taking over from Bintou Keita. In that year her ultimate boss United Nations Secretary-General António Guterres noted that there had been no measurable political improvement in Darfur.

Gbeho was appointed Deputy Special Envoy by António Guterres at the end of 2020 for the United Nations Support Mission in Somalia (UNSOM), succeeding Raisedon Zenenga from Zimbabwe, who became the Assistant UN Secretary-General coordinator of the United Nations Support Mission in Libya (UNSMIL). UNSOM's UN mandate is to improve the role of institutions in Somalia and to increase the rule of law, the role of international partners, democracy and human rights.

Gbeho was part of the leadership team in Somalia working under James Swan, who was the target of an assassination attempt that killed others in 2019. She spent some of her time travelling to different areas in Somalia to understand their needs, although security limits her freedom. During a visit to Kismayo, the interim capital of Jubaland, in November 2021, she was given a security briefing at the airport before heading for the UN compound. She met Jubaland President, Ahmed Mohamed Islam "Madobe", and was "very pleased" to hear that two seats were to be reserved for women in Somalia's upper house by the President. This is in line with the objective of getting 30 per cent of the country's political representation to be by women. She completed her assignment in Somalia as the Deputy Special Representative of the Secretary-General for the United Nations Assistance Mission in Somalia (UNSOM) in 2023.

In January 2022 Gbeho attended the Africa Union (AU) and Federal Government of Somalia's Technical meeting in Mogadishu, with international representatives including Tiina Intelmann of the EU and Kate Foster of the UK. The 14 year long AMISOM mission comes to an end in March 2022 and it will be a replaced by a Somali led operation African Union Transition Mission is Somalia (ATMIS).

From 2023 to 2026 she served as Deputy Special Representative in the United Nations Mission in South Sudan and Resident Coordinator in South Sudan, and was appointed to the role of Special Representative of the United Nations Secretary-General and Head of the United Nations Mission in South Sudan in 2026, following the death of Nicholas Haysom.

== Personal life ==
Anita Gbeho has a daughter.
