= Aubrey Hooks =

American diplomat (born 1948)

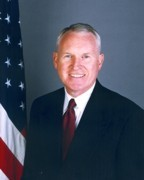
Aubrey Hooks, U.S. Ambassador to Côte d'Ivoire

Aubrey Hooks (born 18 May 1948) is an American diplomat. He served as United States Ambassador to Côte d'Ivoire from 2004 to 2007 and previously as the United States Ambassador to the Democratic Republic of the Congo from 2001 to 2004 and the United States Ambassador to the Republic of the Congo from 1996 to 1999.

Hooks obtained an M.A. degree in economics from the University of Michigan in 1984. He has a bachelor's degree from the University of South Carolina. Hooks is a Latter-Day Saint.

Diplomatic posts
Preceded by William Christie Ramsay	United States Ambassador to the Republic of the Congo; 1996–1999	Succeeded by David H. Kaeuper
Preceded by William Lacy Swing	United States Ambassador to the Democratic Republic of the Congo; 2001–2004	Succeeded by Roger A. Meece
Preceded by Arlene Render	United States Ambassador to Côte d'Ivoire; 2004–2007	Succeeded by Wanda Nesbitt
