= Nicholas Haysom =

South African lawyer and diplomat (1952–2026)

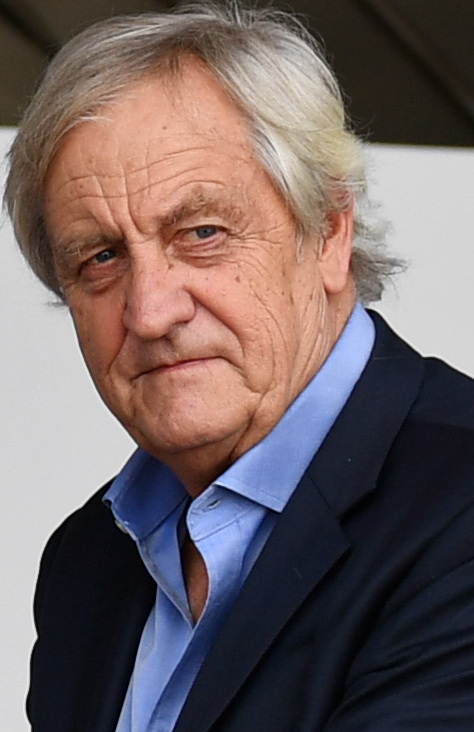
- Haysom in 2018

Special Representative and Head of the UN Mission in South Sudan
- In office 15 January 2021 – 17 March 2026
- Secretary-General: António Guterres
- Preceded by: David Shearer
- Succeeded by: Anita Kiki Gbeho

Special Adviser for Southern Africa
- In office October 2020 – January 2021
- Secretary-General: António Guterres

Special Adviser on Sudan
- In office 2019 – October 2020
- Secretary-General: António Guterres

Special Representative and Head of the UN Assistance Mission in Somalia
- In office 1 October 2018 – 2019
- Secretary-General: António Guterres
- Preceded by: Michael Keating
- Succeeded by: James C. Swan

Special Envoy for Sudan and South Sudan
- In office March 2016 – October 2018
- Secretary-General: Ban Ki-moon; António Guterres
- Preceded by: Haile Menkerios
- Succeeded by: Mandate concluded

Special Representative and Head of the UN Assistance Mission in Afghanistan
- In office September 2014 – March 2016
- Secretary-General: Ban Ki-moon
- Preceded by: Ján Kubiš
- Succeeded by: Tadamichi Yamamoto

Director for Political Affairs in the Executive Office of the Secretary-General
- In office May 2007 – 2012
- Secretary-General: Ban Ki-moon
- Preceded by: Carlos Lopes

Head of the Office of Constitutional Support for the UN Assistance Mission in Iraq
- In office 2005–2007
- Secretary-General: Kofi Annan; Ban Ki-moon

Chief Legal and Constitutional Adviser in the Office of the President of South Africa
- In office May 1994 – 1999
- President: Nelson Mandela

Personal details
- Born: Nicholas Roland Leybourne Haysom; 21 April 1952 Durban, Natal, Union of South Africa
- Died: 17 March 2026 (aged 73) New York City, US
- Spouse(s): Mary Ann Cullinan, Delphine
- Children: 5
- Occupation: Diplomat; legal scholar

Nicholas Roland Leybourne "Fink" Haysom (21 April 1952 – 17 March 2026) was a South African lawyer, anti-apartheid activist and diplomat whose work focused on democratic governance, constitutional and electoral reforms, reconciliation and peace processes. From 2021 to his death, he served as the Special Representative of the United Nations Secretary-General and Head of the United Nations Mission in South Sudan.

== Early life and education ==
Haysom was born in Durban, South Africa, on 21 April 1952. His father had served with the British Royal Air Force during the Battle of Britain and his mother, who had studied at the University of Oxford, was an anti-apartheid activist. He was initially mis-labelled "Finkelstein" at birth, resulting in the life-long nickname "Fink". After attending an Anglican private school in Natal and serving briefly in the South African Navy, he graduated from the University of Natal in 1975 with a Bachelor of Arts degree and from the University of Cape Town in 1978 with a Bachelor of Law degree, and later received honorary Doctor of Law degrees from the University of Cape Town (2012) and the New York Law School (2019).

In 1976, Haysom became president of the National Union of South African Students at a time when the anti-apartheid student organization was in disarray following the arrest of many of its leaders. He was jailed four times by the regime, including periods when he was kept in solitary confinement.

== Career ==
=== Academic and legal work ===
During the 1980s and early 1990s, Haysom was a lawyer for the human rights law firm Cheadle Thompson & Haysom Attorneys in Johannesburg, which he had founded with two fellow academics from the University of Witwatersrand, Halton Cheadle and Clive Thompson. His caseload included negotiating in disputes between Cyril Ramaphosa, then a mineworkers' leader, and the white-owned mining companies. He also served as an associate professor at the Centre for Applied Legal Studies at the University of the Witwatersrand.

=== Government of South Africa ===
From 1994 to 1999, Haysom was the chief legal and constitutional adviser to the government of South Africa during the presidency of Nelson Mandela. In that role he helped to draft a new constitution for South Africa that enshrined equal rights for Black people, minorities and white people.

From 1999 to 2002, he was involved in the Burundi peace talks as chair of the committee negotiating constitutional issues, helping to develop the Arusha Accords. He was also the principal adviser to the mediator in the Sudanese peace process from 2002 to 2005, which resulted in South Sudan achieving independence.

=== United Nations ===
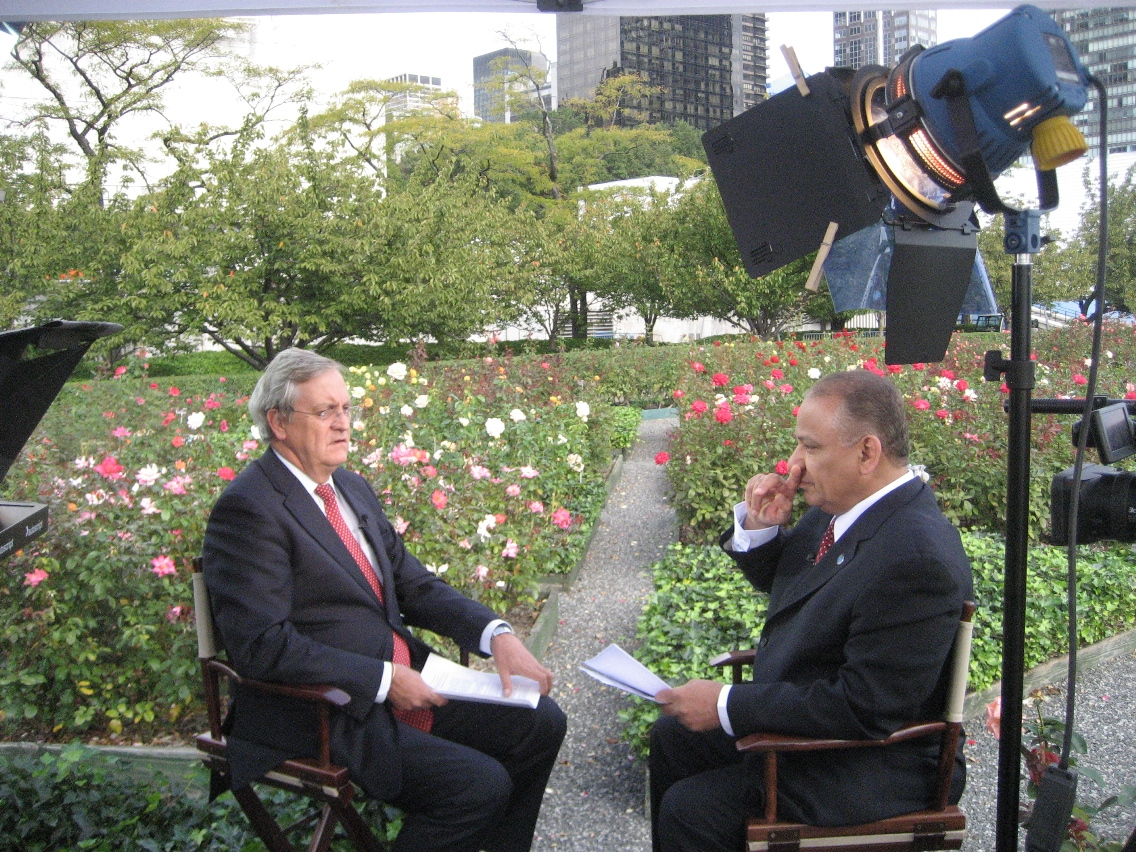
Haysom (left) sitting for a 2009 interview with Talal Al-Haj (right)

After joining the United Nations in 2005, Haysom served as head of the Office of Constitutional Support for the United Nations Assistance Mission for Iraq until 2007, helping to draft the constitution of Iraq. From 2007 to 2012, he was in charge of political, peacekeeping and humanitarian affairs in the Executive Office of the UN Secretary-General, Ban Ki-moon. In 2012, Haysom was appointed Deputy Special Representative of the Secretary-General for the United Nations Assistance Mission in Afghanistan and in 2014 he was promoted to Special Representative of the mission. Assessing the limits of his work for the United Nations in Iraq and Afghanistan led him to "increasingly appreciate what Mandela brought to the table – which was somebody who was bigger than the divisions in society: the absence of a unifying figure in either Iraq or Afghanistan is noticeable".

Succeeding Haile Menkerios, Haysom was appointed Special Envoy for Sudan and South Sudan in 2016. Two years later, in 2018, Ban's successor as Secretary-General, António Guterres, appointed him as his Special Representative for Somalia and Head of the United Nations Assistance Mission in Somalia. He was expelled from the country on 1 January 2019, after only four months in the role, by the Somali government of Mohamed Abdullahi Mohamed, which claimed that he had threatened the sovereignty of the country after questioning the legal basis of the arrest of Mukhtar Robow. The United Nations Security Council expressed regret at Somalia's decision to expel a United Nations envoy who questioned the arrest of an extremist group defector-turned-political candidate.

Haysom then served as the Secretary-General's Special Adviser on Sudan from 2019 to 2020 and on Southern Africa from 2020 to 2021. In 2021, Guterres announced Haysom's appointment as his Special Representative and Head of the United Nations Mission in South Sudan. On 10 April 2026, Guterres named Deputy Special Representative Anita Kiki Gbeho to succeed Haysom in this position.

== Personal life and death ==
Haysom was married twice: first to Mary Ann Cullinan, with whom he had two daughters and a son; and subsequently to Delphine Bost, with whom he had a further two sons.

Haysom died in New York City on 17 March 2026, at the age of 73, as a result of "heart and lung complications".

He was remembered by Guterres as a "tireless peacemaker and steadfast champion of the values of the United Nations". South African President Cyril Ramaphosa said that Haysom's "commitment to justice and peace made our country, our continent and the world a better place".

== Works ==
- Ruling with the Whip: A Report on the Violation of Human Rights in the Ciskei. Johannesburg: Centre for Applied Legal Studies, University of the Witwatersrand. 1983. ISBN 9780854948000.
- Carnegie II Conference Papers: Second Carnegie Inquiry into Poverty and Development in Southern Africa. Cape Town: Southern Africa Labour and Development Research Unit, University of Cape Town. 1984. ISBN 9780799208535.
  - Haysom, Nicholas; Thompson, Clive. "Farm Labour and the Law" (PDF). Carnegie Conference Paper No. 84.
  - Haysom, Nicholas; Armstrong, Amanda. "Population Relocation and the Law: Social Engineering on a Vast Scale" (PDF). Carnegie Conference Paper No. 86.
  - Haysom, Nicholas; Khoza, Modise. "Trade Unions in the Homelands" (PDF). Carnegie Conference Paper No. 110.
- Constitutional Court for South Africa. Johannesburg: Centre for Applied Legal Studies, University of the Witwatersrand. 1991. ISBN 9781874856535. OCLC 502427946.
- Dugard, John; Haysom, Nicholas; Marcus, Gilbert (1992). The Last Years of Apartheid: Civil Liberties in South Africa. New York: Ford Foundation and Foreign Policy Association. ISBN 9780871241450. OCLC 801787619.
- Mabangalala: The Rise of Right-Wing Vigilantes in South Africa. Johannesburg: Centre for Applied Legal Studies, University of the Witwatersrand. 1996. ISBN 9780854949199.
- Cheadle, Halton; Davis, Dennis; Haysom, Nicholas (2002). South African Constitutional Law: The Bill of Rights (1st ed.). Johannesburg: Butterworths. ISBN 9780409018233.
