= James C. Swan =

American diplomat

- Official portrait, 2014

Special Representative for Somalia
- In office May 30, 2019 – October 27, 2022
- Secretary-General: António Guterres
- Preceded by: Nicholas Haysom
- Succeeded by: Anita Kiki Gbeho

United States Ambassador to the Democratic Republic of the Congo
- In office November 1, 2013 – December 30, 2016
- President: Barack Obama
- Preceded by: James F. Entwistle
- Succeeded by: Michael A. Hammer

United States Ambassador to Djibouti
- In office November 10, 2008 – June 30, 2011
- President: George W. Bush; Barack Obama
- Preceded by: Stuart Symington
- Succeeded by: Geeta Pasi

Personal details
- Born: James Christopher Swan; December 10, 1963 (age 62) Washington, D.C., U.S.
- Education: Georgetown University; National War College; Johns Hopkins University

James Christopher Swan (born December 10, 1963) is an American diplomat. He was the Special Representative of the United Nations Secretary-General for Somalia from May 2019 to October 2022.

== Early life and education ==
Swan was born on 10 December 1963 in Washington, D.C.

He holds a Bachelor of Science in Foreign Service from the Edmund A. Walsh School of Foreign Service at Georgetown University, a Master of Arts from the Paul H. Nitze School of Advanced International Studies at Johns Hopkins University, and a Master of Arts in National Security Studies from the US National War College, where he was a 2005 distinguished graduate.

== Career ==
Prior to assuming his role with the United Nations in Somalia, Swan had a nearly three-decade career with the US Foreign Service. Most of this diplomatic work focused on African countries.

In his bilateral diplomatic career, Swan held positions related to Somalia and the Horn of Africa. These include US Special Representative for Somalia (2011–2013), Ambassador to Djibouti (2008–2011), Deputy Assistant Secretary of State for East and Central Africa (2006–2008), Africa Director in the Bureau of Intelligence and Research (2005–2006), and Political Officer in the Office of the Special Envoy for Somalia (1994–1996).

He also served as the US ambassador to the Democratic Republic of the Congo (2013–2016), in addition to prior staff assignments in the Republic of Congo, Cameroon, Nicaragua, and Haiti.

== United Nations ==
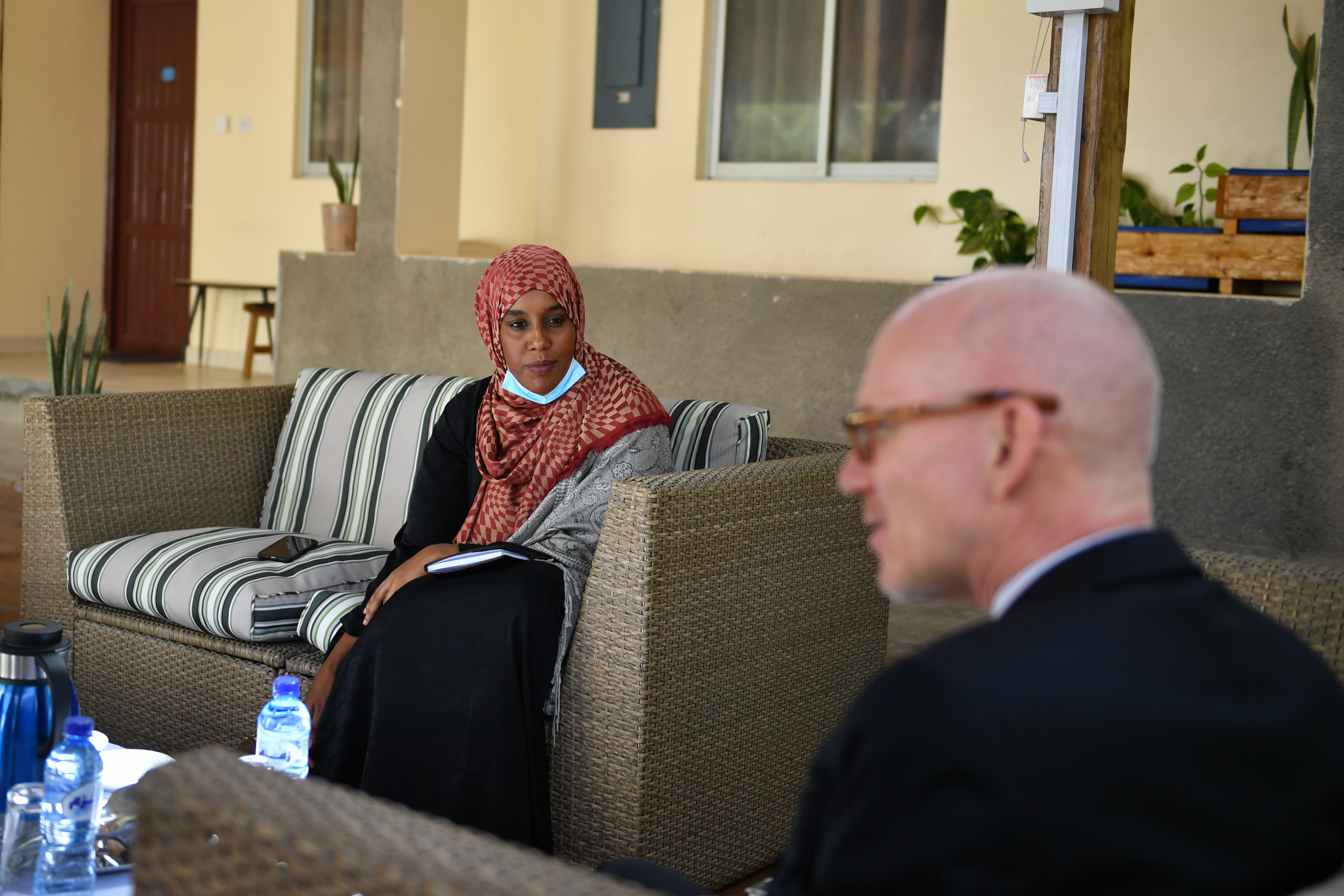
James Swan meeting with Minister of Women and Human Rights Development Her Excellency Haniifa Mohamed Ibrahim on 26 January 2021

UN Secretary-General António Guterres appointed Swan to lead the UN team in Somalia on May 30, 2019. He was responsible for UN operations in Somalia, including two UN missions and 23 agencies, funds, and programmes that together had approximately 2,000 national and international staff and an operating budget around $2 billion.

Swan served concurrently as the Head of the United Nations Assistance Mission in Somalia (UNSOM). This UN special political mission operates under a UN Security Council mandate to support Somali institutions, strengthen Somali coordination with international partners in the security sector, help Somalis advance in reconciliation and democratic governance, and promote the rule of law and human rights.

== Assassination attempt ==
On 24 July 2019, a female suicide bomber entered and blew herself up inside Mogadishu Mayor Abdirahmean Omar Osman's office, killing six government officials and injuring nine of Osman's staff. Swan was the target of the attack, but Swan had met the mayor earlier and departed prior to the blast. Osman was critically wounded in the attack and succumbed to his injuries a week later, on 1 August 2019, after having been transported to and hospitalised in Doha, Qatar. The attack was claimed by Al-Shabaab.

Diplomatic posts
| Preceded by Stuart Symington | United States Ambassador to Djibouti; 2008–2011 | Succeeded by Geeta Pasi |
| Preceded by James Entwistle | United States Ambassador to the Democratic Republic of the Congo; 2013–2018 | Succeeded by Michael Hammer |
