= William Andreas Brown =

American diplomat (1930-2024)

William Brown
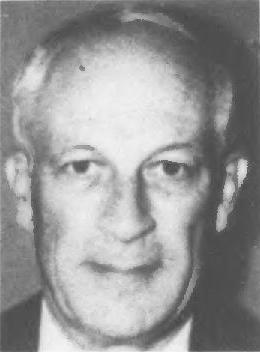

United States Ambassador to Israel
- In office November 22, 1988 – January 7, 1992
- President: Ronald Reagan, George H. W. Bush
- Preceded by: Thomas R. Pickering
- Succeeded by: William Caldwell Harrop

Personal details
- Born: September 7, 1930 Winchester, Massachusetts, U.S.
- Died: July 19, 2024 (aged 93) Arlington, Virginia, U.S.
- Education: Harvard University

William Andreas Brown (September 7, 1930 – July 19, 2024) was an American diplomat who served as the U.S. Ambassador to Thailand from 1985 to 1988 and U.S. Ambassador to Israel from 1988 to 1992. He also served as the last Chief of mission (Chargé d'affaires) of the U.S. Embassy to the Republic of China (Taiwan) stationed in Taipei, Taiwan after the departure of Ambassador Leonard S. Unger in 1979. After diplomatic ties between Taipei and Washington severed, he remained in Taiwan to set up the Taipei Main Office of the American Institute in Taiwan (AIT) at the former compound of U.S. Military Assistance Advisory Group (MAAG). He then served as the Acting Director and Deputy Director of the American Institute in Taiwan (after the inauguration of Charles T. Cross, first Director to Taiwan).

Brown was born in Winchester, Massachusetts, and grew up in East Lexington, Massachusetts, and graduated from Lexington High School (Massachusetts). He majored in history at Harvard on a Naval Reserve Officers Training Corps scholarship and served as an artillery officer in the United States Marine Corps from 1952 to 1954 and the reserves from 1954 to 1960. He was stationed in Korea after the Korean War from August 1953 for about a year.

Brown died on July 19, 2024, at the age of 93.

Diplomatic posts
Preceded by John Gunther Dean	U.S. Ambassador to Thailand; 1985–1988	Succeeded by Daniel Anthony O'Donohue
Preceded by Thomas R. Pickering	U.S. Ambassador to Israel; 1988–1992	Succeeded by William Caldwell Harrop
