= William J. Garvelink =

American diplomat (born 1949)

William Garvelink
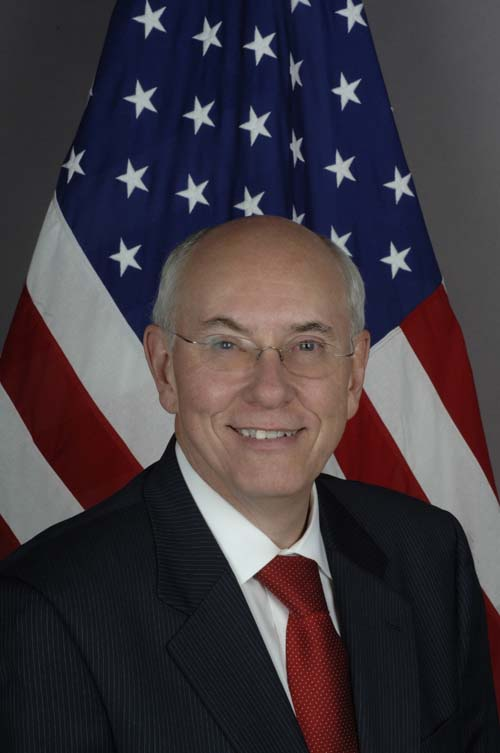

United States Ambassador to Congo-Kinshasa
- In office November 29, 2007 – May 10, 2010
- Appointed by: George W. Bush; Barack Obama
- Preceded by: Roger Meece
- Succeeded by: James F. Entwistle

Personal details
- Born: May 22, 1949 (age 77) Holland, Michigan, US
- Died: August 23, 2025 (Aged 76)
- Spouse: Linda Arendsen
- Education: Calvin College; University of Minnesota; University of North Carolina

William John Garvelink (born May 22, 1949) is an American diplomat and former United States Ambassador to the Democratic Republic of the Congo appointed by George W. Bush on May 30, 2007, and sworn in on October 22, 2007.

== Biography ==
=== Early life and education ===
Garvelink was born in Holland, Michigan, and graduated from Calvin College (B.A.) in 1971 and the University of Minnesota (M.A.). He began post-graduate studies at the University of North Carolina in Latin American history, but ran out of money before earning his Ph.D.. Garvelink joined the United States Agency for International Development (USAID) in 1979.

=== Career ===
Before he joined AID, Garvelink was a professional staff member of the Subcommittee on International Organizations and the Committee on Foreign Affairs of the U.S. House of Representatives. His responsibilities included oversight of USAID’s worldwide humanitarian assistance and democracy programs. Offices within the Bureau for Democracy, Conflict and Humanitarian Assistance include the Office of Foreign Disaster Assistance, Office of Transition Initiatives, Office of Food for Peace, Office of Democracy and Governance, Office of Conflict Management and Mitigation and the Office of Private and Voluntary Cooperation. He is a minister counselor of the Senior Foreign Service.

Before his appointment as ambassador, Garvelinkwas from 1999 the USAID mission director in Eritrea. He administered a development and relief program worth more than $55 million US dollars.

Garvelink received six Performance Awards, two Meritorious Honor Awards, a Superior Honor Award and a Senior Foreign Service Presidential Meritorious Service Award during his time with the U.S. Department of State.

From 1988 until 1999, Garvelink worked in the Office of Foreign Disaster Assistance (OFDA), first as the assistant director for response and then as the deputy director. While in OFDA, he directed relief operations in Africa, Asia, Latin America, the Near East, Europe and in the former Soviet Union. He led many Disaster Assistance Response Teams, or DARTs, to parts of Albania, Armenia, Democratic Republic of the Congo, Haiti, Iraq, Kenya, Rwanda, Somalia and Iran. He chaired the USAID Task Force for the 2004 Indian Ocean Tsunami, the Task Force for the Pakistani Earthquake and the Lebanese Task Force.

Before the OFDA, Garvelink spent two years in the Department of State's Bureau for Population, Refugees and Migration with responsibilities for much of southern Africa. He was appointed for four years in Bolivia for USAID and spent three years as a staff member of the House Foreign Affairs Committee.

=== Personal life ===
Garvelink is married to Linda A. Garvelink, whom he met in high school, and is a banking industry specialist.

== Published works ==
Garvelink has written many published works, including:

- Humanitarian Assistance Intervention in Complex Emergencies: Information Requirements in the 1990s edited by Jim Whitman and David Pocock, St. Martin's Press, Inc., 1996
- "Complex Emergencies in Africa in the 1990s: The Role of Technology" in Meeting the Challenge of International Peace Operations: Assessing the Contribution of Technology, edited by Alex Gliksman (proceedings of a conference sponsored by the Center for Global Security Research, June 1998 and held in Livermore, California September 9–10, 1996)
- "Special Report: United States Response to the Earthquake in Bam, Iran" in The Liaison (Journal of Civil-Military Humanitarian Relief Collaboration), 3:2, 2004

Diplomatic posts
Preceded by Roger A. Meece	United States Ambassador to the Democratic Republic of the Congo; July 2, 2007– 2010	Succeeded by James F. Entwistle
