= Henry Lamar Crosby =

- Born: 1880
- Died: 1954 (aged 73–74)
- Citizenship: United States
- Education: University of Texas
- Occupation: professor
- Awards: Royal Order of George I

Henry Lamar Crosby (May 17, 1880 in Menominee, Michigan – March 20, 1954), known as H. Lamar Crosby, was an American classicist who served as dean of the graduate school of the University of Pennsylvania.

Crosby graduated from high school in San Antonio, Texas and completed his undergraduate studies at the University of Texas. While at Texas, due to a paucity of funds, he supported himself as a day laborer and dairy farm hand. The financial generosity of an uncle allowed him to attend Harvard University, from which he received his Ph.D. After stints at the University of Missouri and Princeton University, Crosby began teaching at the University of Pennsylvania and, from 1928 to 1938, was dean of its graduate school. With John Nevin Schaeffer he was the author of Introduction to Greek, which later became a popular textbook on the subject, remaining in print for the 20 years after publication. In 1925 he spent a year as annual professor at the American School of Classical Research in Athens, participating in the archaeological excavation of the Athenian market.

He was invested into the Royal Order of George I at the rank of commander, and was a member of the Archaeological Institute of America. His son, Oliver S. Crosby, was United States Ambassador to Guinea from 1977 to 1980.
