= G. McMurtrie Godley =

American diplomat (1917–1999)

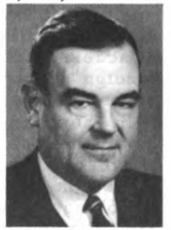

United States Ambassador to the Democratic Republic of the Congo
- In office February 20, 1964 – October 15, 1966
- President: Lyndon B. Johnson
- Preceded by: Edmund A. Gullion
- Succeeded by: Robert H. McBride

United States Ambassador to Laos
- In office July 24, 1969 – April 23, 1973
- President: Richard Nixon
- Preceded by: William H. Sullivan
- Succeeded by: Charles S. Whitehouse

Personal details
- Born: August 23, 1917
- Died: November 7, 1999 (aged 82)
- Education: University of Nebraska, Kearney (BA); University of Virginia (MA)

George McMurtrie Godley (1917–1999) was an American diplomat who served as United States Ambassador to Laos 1969-1973, at the height of the Vietnam War. President Richard Nixon nominated Godley as Assistant Secretary of State for East Asian and Pacific Affairs in 1973, but his nomination was rejected by the United States Senate Committee on Foreign Relations.

== Biography ==
G. McMurtrie Godley, known informally as "Mac", was born on August 23, 1917, in New York City. He was educated at the Hotchkiss School and at Yale University, and spent some time on graduate work at the University of Chicago.

Godley joined the United States Foreign Service in 1941. He was posted in France, Switzerland, Belgium, Cambodia and the Republic of the Congo (Léopoldville).

In 1946, he married Livia Paravicini, who had served as a sergeant major in the Swiss Army Ambulance Corps during World War II. The couple divorced in 1963.

On February 20, 1964, President Lyndon B. Johnson appointed Godley United States Ambassador to the Democratic Republic of the Congo. Ambassador Godley presented his credentials to the Congolese government on March 23, 1964. During his time as ambassador, Mobutu Sese Seko staged a second coup and seized control of the country. Godley left this post on October 15, 1966.

Godley married his second wife, Elizabeth McCray Johnson, on March 26, 1966 in Leopoldville. Johnson was his former secretary. Together, they had two sons, George and Nicholas.

In 1969, President Richard M. Nixon appointed Godley Ambassador to the Kingdom of Laos, with Godley presenting his credentials on July 24. Godley arrived in the midst of the Laotian Civil War and effectuated the American policy of supporting the Royal Lao Government against the Communist Pathet Lao. Although Laos was officially neutral in the ongoing Vietnam War, the Central Intelligence Agency was secretly active in Laos, organizing and financing Laotian and Thai guerillas who were fighting the Pathet Lao and the North Vietnamese. Godley left his position as Ambassador to Laos on April 23, 1973.

Upon his return to the U.S., Nixon nominated Godley as Assistant Secretary of State for East Asian and Pacific Affairs. J. William Fulbright, the chairman of the United States Senate Committee on Foreign Relations, opposed this nomination, arguing that Godley was too closely identified with failed American policy in Southeast Asia to supervise U.S. diplomatic efforts in Asia.

Following the failure of this nomination, on February 13, 1974, Nixon nominated Godley as United States Ambassador to Lebanon. Godley presented his credentials on March 15, 1974, and served as ambassador until January 13, 1976.

Upon his return from Lebanon, Godley retired from the Foreign Service and settled in Morris, New York. At this time, Godley learned that he had throat cancer and his larynx was removed as a result. In spite of his battle with throat cancer, Godley enjoyed an active retirement. He participated in founding the Glimmerglass Opera near Cooperstown, New York, serving as its first president, and later as chairman emeritus until the time of his death. He also served as chairman of Hartwick College and of Oneonta's Fox Hospital.

In August 1992, Godley's activities as ambassador to Laos were examined by the United States Senate Select Committee on POW/MIA Affairs. Some reports suggested that during the withdrawal of U.S. troops from Indochina in the wake of the Fall of Saigon, as many as 135 American prisoners of war may have been left behind. Before the committee, Godley testified that he had done his best to account for all American P.O.W.s in Indochina, and that he believed that no P.O.W.s remained when he left Indochina in 1973.

Godley died at age 82 of heart failure on November 7, 1999, at Fox Hospital in Oneonta, New York.

Diplomatic posts
Preceded by Edmund A. Gullion	U.S. Ambassador to the Democratic Republic of the Congo; 1964–1966	Succeeded by Robert H. McBride
Preceded by William H. Sullivan	U.S. Ambassador to Laos; 1969–1973	Succeeded by Charles S. Whitehouse
Preceded by William B. Buffum	U.S. Ambassador to Lebanon; 1974–1976	Succeeded by Francis E. Meloy, Jr.
