= John Nevin Schaeffer =

American classical philologist

John Nevin Schaeffer (July 23, 1882 – June 10, 1942) was an American classicist from Danville, Pennsylvania, who spent his career teaching at Franklin & Marshall College, from which he also received his bachelor's degree in 1903. He later received a second degree from Oriel College at the University of Oxford, where he was a Rhodes Scholar. With Henry Lamar Crosby, whom he met while teaching summer courses at the University of Pennsylvania, he wrote Introduction to Greek, a popular textbook on ancient Greek which remained in print for 20 years.

Schaeffer was a member of the Lancaster, Pennsylvania, school board. He married Ruth Frantz and they had five children.

His son, Philip B. Schaeffer, was city editor at The Philadelphia Inquirer.
