= William L. Swing =

American diplomat (1934–2021)

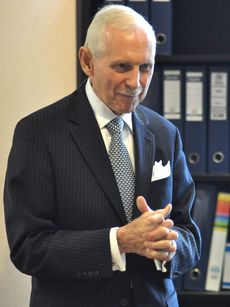
- William Lacy Swing, Director General of the International Organization for Migration during visit to Indonesia, April 2013.

9th Director General of the International Organization for Migration
- In office June 18, 2008 – September 30, 2018
- Preceded by: Brunson McKinley
- Succeeded by: António Vitorino

Personal details
- Born: William Lacy Swing; September 11, 1934 Lexington, North Carolina, U.S.
- Died: June 12, 2021 (aged 86) Kuala Lumpur, Malaysia
- Education: Catawba College; Yale University; University of Tübingen
- Occupation: Diplomat

William Lacy Swing (September 11, 1934 – June 12, 2021) was an American diplomat and former United States Ambassador, and United Nations Special Representative of the Secretary-General and Under Secretary General. He was the Director-General of the International Organization for Migration until António Vitorino's appointment in 2018.

== Early life and education ==
Swing was born on September 11, 1934, in Lexington, North Carolina. In 1956 he graduated from Catawba College in North Carolina (Bachelor of Arts). Four years later he received a Master of Divinity from Yale University. He did post-graduate studies at the University of Tübingen in Germany. He was a Fellow at Harvard University from 1976 to 1977.

He held an honorary degree from the Geneva School of Diplomacy and International Relations, and Hofstra University (Doctor of Humane Letters), and was an Honorary Fellow of Harris Manchester College, Oxford.

He spoke French, German, Afrikaans, and Creole.

== Ambassadorial posts ==
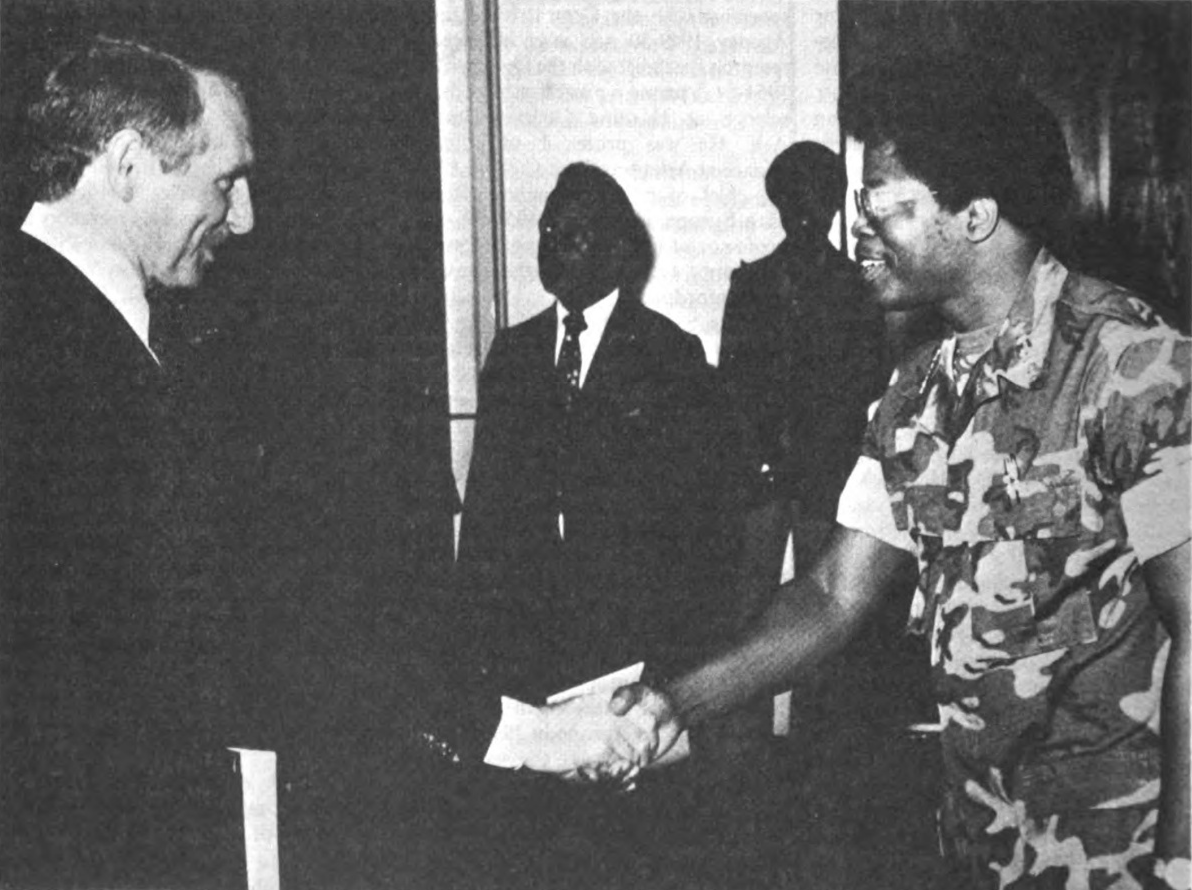
Swing, as Ambassador to Liberia, presenting credentials to Commander-in-Chief Samuel K. Doe, head of state and chairman, People's Redemption Council

- United States Ambassador to the People's Republic of the Congo (1979–81)
- United States Ambassador to Liberia (1981–85)
- United States Ambassador to South Africa (1989–92)
- United States Ambassador to Nigeria (1992–93)
- United States Ambassador to Haiti (1993–98)
- United States Ambassador to the Democratic Republic of the Congo (1998–2001)

== United Nations ==
=== Western Sahara ===
Swing served as UN Special Representative of the Secretary-General to Western Sahara from 2001 to 2003. He was Chief of Mission for the United Nations Mission for the Referendum in Western Sahara (MINURSO).

=== Democratic Republic of the Congo ===
Swing then led the MONUSCO (the United Nations Organization Stabilization Mission in the Democratic Republic of the Congo) (May 2003 - January 2008). He was appointed as Special Representative of the Secretary General to the United Nations Mission in the Democratic Republic of Congo (MONUC), with the rank of Under Secretary General. MONUC, now known as MONUSCO, is the UN's largest peace operation. The Mission is engaged in the peace process and providing security support to the country as it seeks to end armed conflict in the war torn eastern part of the Congo.

== International Organization for Migration ==
In June 2008 Swing was elected Director-General of the International Organization for Migration (IOM). In early 2017, UN Secretary-General António Guterres appointed him to the 9-member High-Level Task Force to Improve the United Nations Approach for Preventing and Addressing Sexual Abuse.

Swing's term as Director-General ended in September 2018. He was succeeded by Portuguese politician Antonio Vitorino on October 1.

== Awards ==
He was a member of the American Academy of Diplomacy. In 2012, he received the American Foreign Service Association's Award for Lifetime Contributions to American Diplomacy.

In 2019, he was awarded the Grand Cordon of the Order of the Rising Sun, by the government of Japan.

Diplomatic posts
Preceded by Daniel H. Simpson	United States Ambassador to the Democratic Republic of the Congo; 1998–2001	Succeeded by Aubrey Hooks
Preceded by office reestablished	United States Ambassador to People's Republic of the Congo; 1979–1981	Succeeded by Kenneth L. Brown
Preceded by Robert P. Smith	United States Ambassador to Liberia; 1981–1985	Succeeded by Edward Joseph Perkins
Preceded by Lannon Walker	United States Ambassador to Nigeria; 1992–1993	Succeeded by Walter C. Carrington
Preceded by Edward Joseph Perkins	United States Ambassador to South Africa; 1989–1992	Succeeded by Princeton N. Lyman
Preceded by Vicki Huddleston (as Chargé d'Affaires)	United States Ambassador to Haiti; 1993–1998	Succeeded by Timothy M. Carney
