= Daniel H. Simpson =

American former Foreign Service Officer (born 1939)

- Born: Daniel Howard Simpson; July 9, 1939; Wheeling, West Virginia, U.S.
- Died: June 6, 2022 (aged 82); Bethesda, Maryland, U.S.
- Occupation: Diplomat

Daniel Howard Simpson (July 9, 1939 – June 6, 2022) was an American Foreign Service Officer. He was the United States Ambassador to the Central African Republic (1990–92), Special Envoy to Somalia and the United States Ambassador to the Democratic Republic of the Congo (1995–98) as well as undertaking other overseas assignments in Burundi, South Africa, Zaire (on three separate occasions) Iceland, Lebanon and Bosnia-Herzegovina. He also served as the Deputy Commandant of the United States Army War College and on the Board of directors as the Vice President of the National Defense University for the United States Institute of Peace.

Before joining the United States Foreign Service and becoming a diplomat in 1966, Simpson studied English literature at Yale University and African studies at Northwestern University, before travelling Africa to teach at the Eghosa Anglican Boys’ School in Benin City, Nigeria, and at the Libyan Army Military College in Benghazi, Libya.

After retirement from the Department of State in 2001, Simpson has been a writer and columnist for the Pittsburgh Post-Gazette and The Blade as well as a member of the American Academy of Diplomacy.

Diplomatic posts
Preceded by Melissa Foelsch Wells	United States Ambassador to the Democratic Republic of the Congo; 1995–1998	Succeeded by William Lacy Swing
Preceded by David C. Fields	United States Ambassador to Central African Republic; 1989–1990	Succeeded by Robert E. Gribbin, 3rd
