= Wilbert J. Le Melle =

American diplomat

Wilbert John Le Melle
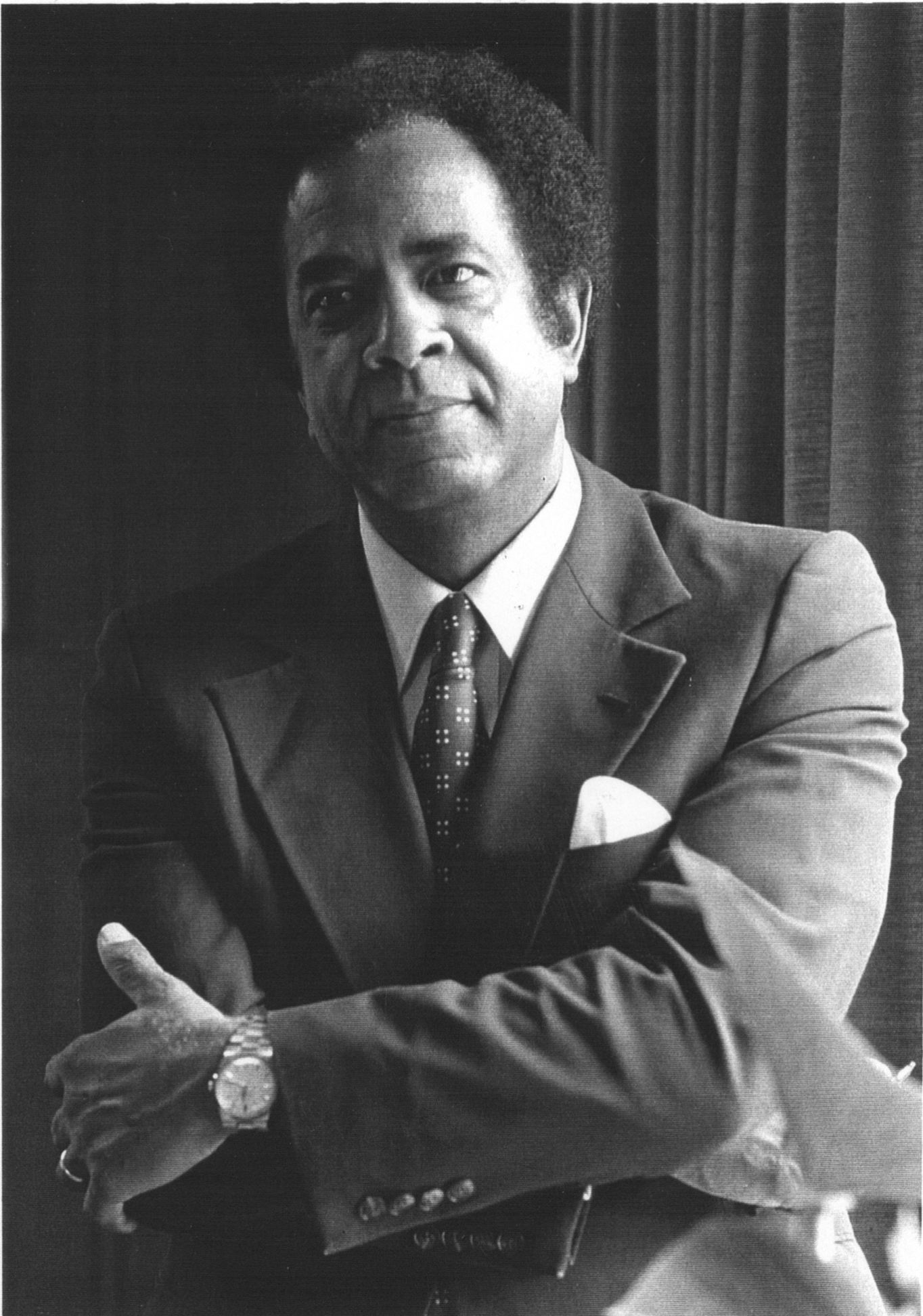

United States Ambassador to Kenya
- In office May 11, 1977 – June 28, 1980
- Preceded by: Anthony D. Marshall
- Succeeded by: William Caldwell Harrop

United States Ambassador to Seychelles
- In office May 11, 1977 – June 28, 1980
- Preceded by: Anthony D. Marshall
- Succeeded by: William Caldwell Harrop

Personal details
- Born: November 11, 1931 New Iberia, Louisiana, United States
- Died: January 11, 2003 (aged 71) New Rochelle, New York
- Party: Democratic
- Spouse: Yvonne T. Le Melle (née Tauriac)
- Children: 4

Wilbert John Le Melle (November 11, 1931 – January 11, 2003) was an American diplomat, author and academician. He served as an Ambassador of The United States to the Republic of Kenya and to the Republic of Seychelles from 1977 to 1980. He was also a president of Mercy College in New York and of the Phelps Stokes Fund.

== Biography ==
Born on November 11, 1931, in New Iberia, Louisiana, he was one of eight children born to Therese and Eloi LeMelle. Initially studying to become a priest, he received a Bachelor of Arts in 1955 and a Master of Arts in 1956 from Notre Dame Seminary. He left the seminary at age 24 and then earned a Ph.D. in political science/international relations in 1963 from the University of Denver. He served in the United States Army from 1957 to 1959.

He was an assistant professor in of history and philosophy at Grambling State University between 1956 and 1961. Between 1963 until 1965 he worked in the Department of Government at Boston University as an assistant professor and research associate in the African Studies Program. In February 1965 he started work at the Ford Foundation, as a program officer for West Africa. He spent the next nine years living in various parts of Africa with his family while his job location changed, places like Kenya, Maghreb, Algeria, Morocco, and Tunisia. In 1977, president Jimmy Carter asked Le Melle to serve as Ambassador of the United States to the Republic of Kenya and the Seychelles.

From 1981 to 1985, he served as vice-chancellor of the State University of New York. In 1985, he was appointed as president of Mercy College, now Mercy University, in New York From 1990 to 2000, he served as President of the Phelps Stokes Fund.

Diplomatic posts
| Preceded by Anthony D. Marshall | United States Ambassador to Kenya; 1977–1980 | Succeeded by William Caldwell Harrop |
| Preceded by Anthony D. Marshall | United States Ambassador to Seychelles; 1977–1980 | Succeeded by William Caldwell Harrop |
