= Larry DuPraz =

Larry DuPraz (1919–2006) was the long-time production supervisor of The Daily Princetonian and Princeton University's unofficial "professor of journalism." From 1946 until 1987, DuPraz oversaw production of Princeton's independent student daily newspaper. DuPraz supervised publishing using technology ranging from hot lead type to modern desktop publishing. In this position, DuPraz ran what many alumni and journalists refer to as the "Larry DuPraz School of Journalism," an unofficial academy through which he educated and influenced some of the most important names in American journalism, including:

- Joel Achenbach 1982, writer for The Washington Post and author of the Post's Achenblog.
- Peter D. Bunzel 1949, op-ed page editor, Los Angeles Times.
- Robert Caro 1957, Pulitzer Prize-winning non-fiction writer.
- Frank Deford 1961, writer for Sports Illustrated and broadcaster on U.S. radio and television.
- Barton Gellman 1982, editor at The Washington Post and Pulitzer Prize-winner.
- Donald Kirk 1959, national correspondent, Chicago Tribune.
- Don Oberdorfer 1952, former writer for the Washington Post. Now a professor at Johns Hopkins University.
- James Ridgeway 1959, editor and writer, New Republic and Village Voice.
- Mark Stevens 1973, film critic for New York Magazine and co-author of De Kooning: An American Master.
- Annalyn Swan 1973, co-author of 2005 Pulitzer Prize-winning De Kooning: An American Master.
- Christine Whelan 1999, author of Why Smart Men Marry Smart Women

Upon retiring in 1987, DuPraz was recognized by President Ronald Reagan for his lifelong contribution to American education and journalism. After his retirement, DuPraz remained a trusted adviser and loyal friend to the newspaper, some would say a curmudgeon, making regular appearances in the newsroom at least through 2004. A lifelong Princeton resident and diehard Princeton basketball fan, DuPraz was also a committed volunteer fireman and World War II veteran. He married Nora Enright (1919-2008), also of Princeton, in 1947. They had one daughter, Claudia (1950-2009), and four grandsons. In December 2006, DuPraz died of heart disease at the age of 87. Several Daily Princetonian alumni share their memories of DuPraz's life on the newspaper's blog.
