= Brandon Grove =

American diplomat (1929–2016)

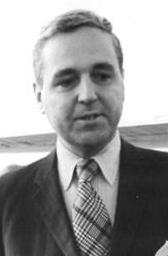

Director of the Foreign Service Institute
- In office July 5, 1988 – August 14, 1992
- President: George H. W. Bush; Bill Clinton
- Preceded by: Charles Bray
- Succeeded by: Lawrence Taylor

United States Ambassador to Zaire
- In office September 18, 1984 – September 18, 1987
- President: Ronald Reagan
- Preceded by: Peter Constable
- Succeeded by: William C. Harrop

U.S. Consul General in Jerusalem
- In office 1980–1982
- President: Ronald Reagan
- Preceded by: Michael H. Newlin
- Succeeded by: Wat T. Cluverius IV

Inspector General of the Department of State Acting
- In office May 1, 1978 – July 5, 1978
- President: Ronald Reagan
- Preceded by: Robert M. Sayre
- Succeeded by: Theodore L. Eliot Jr.

United States Ambassador to East Germany Acting
- In office December 9, 1974 – December 20, 1974
- President: Gerald Ford
- Preceded by: Position established
- Succeeded by: John Sherman Cooper

Personal details
- Born: Brandon Hambright Grove Jr. April 8, 1929 Chicago, Illinois, U.S.
- Died: May 20, 2016 (aged 87) Washington, D.C., U.S.
- Spouse: Mariana Moran
- Education: Bard College (BA); Princeton University (MPA)

Brandon Hambright Grove Jr. (April 8, 1929 – May 20, 2016) was the United States Ambassador to the German Democratic Republic (East Germany) and Zaire (1984–87) and served on the board of directors of the American Academy of Diplomacy.

Grove received an undergraduate degree from Bard College in 1950 and a master's degree in public administration from Princeton University in 1952.

Ambassador Brandon Grove's diplomatic career spanned thirty-five years in the U.S. Foreign Service under nine presidents and twelve secretaries of state.

Born in Chicago (April 8, 1929), he held degrees from Bard College and the Woodrow Wilson School of Princeton University. As an amphibious boat group commander in the U.S. Navy, he served to the rank of Lieutenant. Before joining the U.S. Foreign Service in 1959, he worked on the staff of Congressman Chester Bowles, of Connecticut.

His diplomatic assignments took him to posts in Africa, India, East and West Berlin, and Jerusalem, where he was consul general during Israel's war with Lebanon. In 1974, he became the first American diplomat accredited to East Germany, where he established the embassy in Berlin. During 1984-87, he served as President Reagan's ambassador to Zaire.

Among assignments in Washington, he twice filled positions managing U.S. relations with Panama, Central America, and the Caribbean, first as director of the Office of Panamanian Affairs, and later as deputy assistant secretary of state for Inter-American Affairs. He served on the policy planning staffs of secretaries of state Henry Kissinger and Warren Christopher.

Ambassador Grove, during 1988-92, was director of the State Department's Foreign Service Institute responsible for foreign affairs training throughout the government. He coordinated the design and construction of its permanent facility at Arlington Hall, Virginia. At Hamilton College, Grove was the Sol M. Linowitz Professor of International Affairs, teaching a course on diplomacy in practice.

In 2000, Bard College awarded him its John Dewey Medal for Distinguished Public Service, and in 2010 the honorary degree of Doctor of Humane Letters for his lifetime contributions to diplomacy. He has three times received the President's Meritorious Service Award.

The University of Missouri Press published his autobiography, Behind Embassy Walls: The Life and Times of an American Diplomat, in June 2005.

Ambassador Grove was president emeritus of the American Academy of Diplomacy.

Grove, Jr. died from complications of cancer on May 20, 2016, in Washington, D.C., aged 87.

== Publications ==
- Behind embassy walls: the life and times of an American diplomat (2005) (ISBN 978-0826215734)

Diplomatic posts
New office	United States Ambassador to East Germany; Acting; 1974	Succeeded by John Cooper
Preceded by Peter Constable	United States Ambassador to Zaire; 1984–1987	Succeeded by William C. Harrop
