= The Daily Princetonian =

Student newspaper for Princeton University

- The Daily Princetonian, February 22, 2012
- Type: Daily student newspaper
- Format: Color Broadsheet
- School: Princeton University
- Owner: The Daily Princetonian Publishing Co.
- Founded: 1876
- Headquarters: 48 University Place; Princeton, New Jersey, U.S. 08540
- ISSN: 0885-7601
- Website: www.dailyprincetonian.com
- Free online archives: Papers of Princeton

The Daily Princetonian, originally known as The Princetonian, is the independent daily student newspaper of Princeton University. The newspaper is owned by The Daily Princetonian Publishing Co. and has a circulation of 2,000 in print and around 30,000 daily online hits as of 2021. Managed by approximately 200 undergraduate students, the newspaper covers a range of sections, including news, sports, and opinions.

Throughout its history, The Daily Princetonian has evolved in frequency, editorial focus, and format. In the 20th century, it covered significant events such as Woodrow Wilson's tenure at Princeton and presidency, World War II, and student activism in the 1960s. In the 21st century, the newspaper faced controversy in 2007 for a fictitious article, and its archives were digitized in 2012. Currently, it operates with a digital daily and weekly print publication format. The newspaper is financially independent, with an annual budget exceeding $70,000.

Notable alumni include Woodrow Wilson, the 28th U.S. president, Supreme Court justices, U.S. ambassadors, and journalists at various media outlets. The paper has received accolades such as a Silver Crown at the Columbia Scholastic Press Association Awards in 2012 and a finalist position for the Associated College Press Online National Pacemaker Award in 2014.

== History ==
=== 19th century ===
The Prince is the second-oldest daily college newspaper in the United States.

The newspaper was founded on June 14, 1876, as a biweekly publication and initially named The Princetonian. As the college grew, the newspaper grew too. In 1883, it became a weekly. In 1885, it increased its publication schedule to three-times weekly. In 1892, its name was changed to The Daily Princetonian, its current name, and its publication schedule was increased to five afternoons a week. In 1895, its publication was increased again to six mornings a week. Early issues of the Prince called for unproctored examinations, a policy introduced with the implementation of the honor code system at the college in 1893. Another issue published a telegraphic report of a Princeton Tigers baseball game, one of the first times a college used a telegraph in its coverage.

=== 20th century ===
In the early 20th century, prior to World War I, the newspaper experienced improvements in its coverage and editorial policy. Woodrow Wilson was covered extensively, first as president of Princeton University from 1902 to 1910 and then, after winning the 1912 presidential election, as the 28th U.S. president from 1913 to 1921. In 1910, it incorporated Associated Press dispatches. It advocated for the abolition of mandatory chapel attendance, supported women's suffrage, and reinforced the ongoing revolt against the campus eating clubs. The 1920s saw the paper become more light-hearted, with the introduction of popular humorous columns, a weekly photograph supplement, and annual pieces like an April Fool's story.

During the 1930s, the newspaper took on a more serious role, partnering with The Harvard Crimson to persuade students to advocate against prohibition. It covered the escalating world tension that ultimately led to World War II, and published columns both for and against the United States entering the war. In February 1943, after the U.S. entered World War II, publication of the newspaper was suspended in February 1943 until the conclusion of the war in 1945. After World War II, the Prince covered the death of Albert Einstein, the election of Robert Goheen a mere three hours after he was elected at a Princeton University faculty meeting, and other topics regarding Princeton University's administration and athletic program. A common topic for news and editorials were eating clubs elections and debates over their influence on student social life.

In the 1960s, the Prince published articles on the assassination of John F. Kennedy in November 1963, and the subsequent week-long cancellation of university events. Five years later, in 1968, the assassination of Martin Luther King Jr. resulted in the publication of letters, editorials, and articles and columns on his influence and student involvement in the civil rights movement. The newspaper continued as a progressive force, calling for coeducation and requesting increased resources targeted at minority enrollment. The Prince played a role in student activism opposing the Vietnam War, organizing events and playing a role in organizing a two-week recess, so students could campaign for in the 1968 presidential election. In 1976, the newspaper celebrated the 100th anniversary of its founding with a seminar and two-day symposium.

=== 21st century ===
In January 2007, the Prince caused controversy when it published a fictitious article in its joke issue, which referenced a lawsuit by Jian Li, who sued Princeton alleging that he was denied admission for being Asian. It received complaints for its purposeful use of broken English and offensive stereotypes towards Asian-Americans. The Prince issued a statement concerning its motivations and expectations for the piece, stating that it did not mean to be offensive but rather satirical.

The paper's archives were digitized in 2012 and were named in honor of a long-time employee, Larry DuPraz. In 2021, the paper began publishing digital articles daily and print articles weekly.

== Organization ==
The Prince is owned by The Daily Princetonian Publishing Co., which is controlled by a board of trustees of mostly former Princeton editors and staffers. The organization is a registered nonprofit, and the organization and newspaper are independent of the university.

The newspaper is produced and managed by a staff of around 200 undergraduate students and has an annual budget of more than $70,000. Its headquarters is located at 48 University Place on Princeton University's campus. The Prince has a daily print circulation of 2,000, and its website receives roughly 30,000 daily hits.

The newspaper is managed by an editor-in-chief and a business manager, and its staff is grouped into various sections, like news, sports, opinions, and more.

In 1974, the Prince elected its first woman business manager, Judy E. Piper; in 1978, it elected its first woman editor, Anne C. Mackay-Smith. The current editor-in-chief is Jerry Zhu, who was elected in December 2025.

== Notable alumni and awards ==
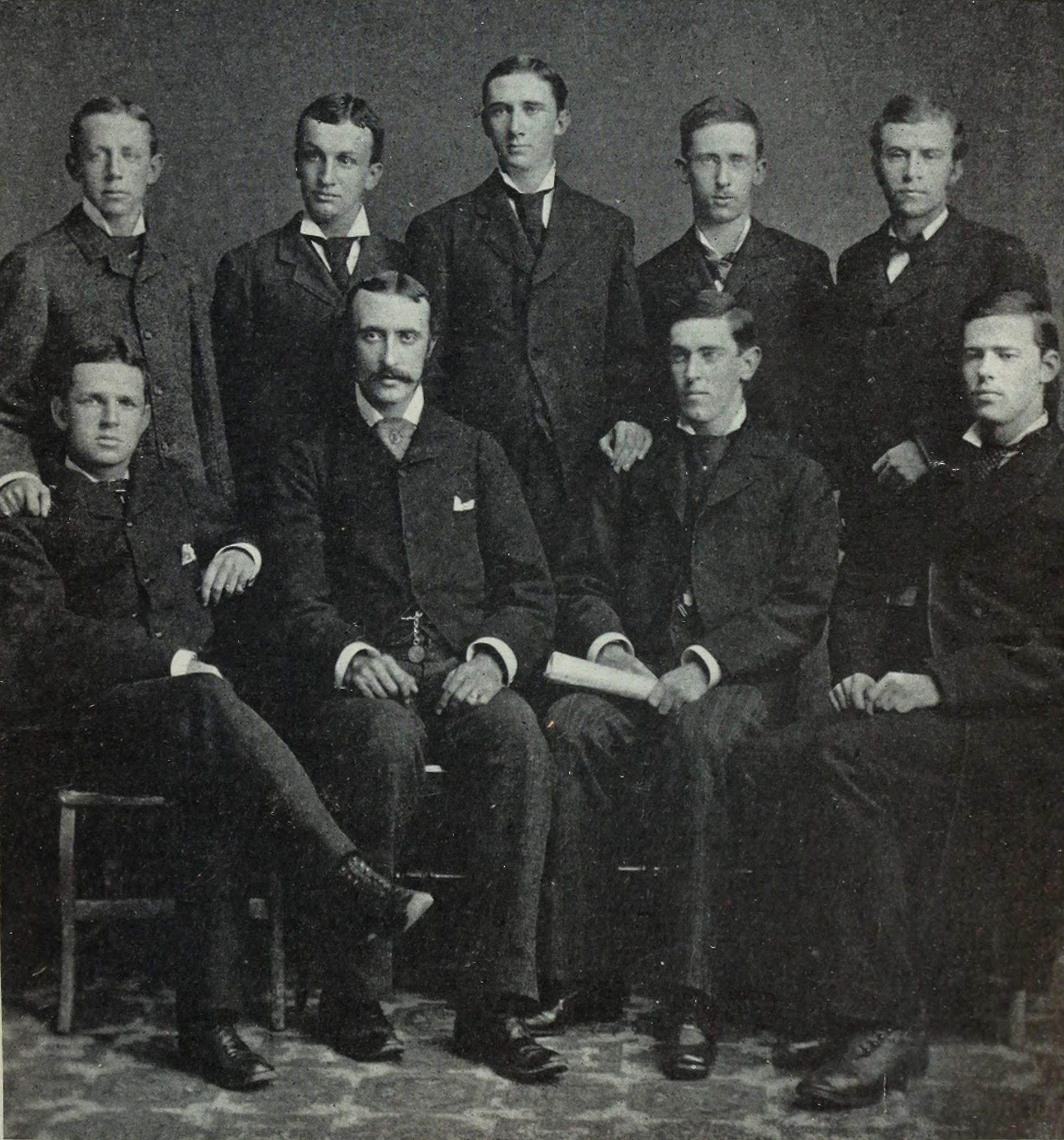
An 1878 photo of Woodrow Wilson (seated, second from right), who served as the newspaper's managing editor

Many columnists and editors for the Prince have gone on to hold prominent positions in both government, journalism, and more. Alumni include President of the United States Woodrow Wilson, Supreme Court Justices John M. Harlan and Elena Kagan, Governor of Illinois Adlai Stevenson, first Secretary of Defense James Forrestal, Secretary of the Air Force James H. Douglas, Jr., and U.S. ambassadors Livingston T. Merchant, Jacob D. Beam, Shelby C. Davis, Robert H. McBride, and William H. Atwood, among others. Philanthropist John D. Rockefeller III served on the paper's business board during his time at Princeton.

Notable journalists and writers include Pulitzer Prize winners Barton Gellman, Mark Stevens, Annalyn Swan, Richard Kluger, and Robert Caro. Others include The Washington Post writers Joel Achenbach and Catherine Rampell; The New York Times writers R.W. Apple, Jr., Bosley Crowther, and John B. Oakes; Hamilton Fish Armstrong of Foreign Policy, Kate Betts of Harper's Bazaar, Frank Deford of Sports Illustrated, William Greider of Rolling Stone, John Stossel of ABC News, and more.

Awards won by the Prince include a Silver Crown in the college newspaper category from the Columbia Scholastic Press Association in 2012 and becoming a 2014 finalist for the Associated College Press Online National Pacemaker Award.
