= Hanifa Mohamed Ibrahim =

Somali Minister of Women and Human Rights Development

Haniifa Mohamed Ibrahim
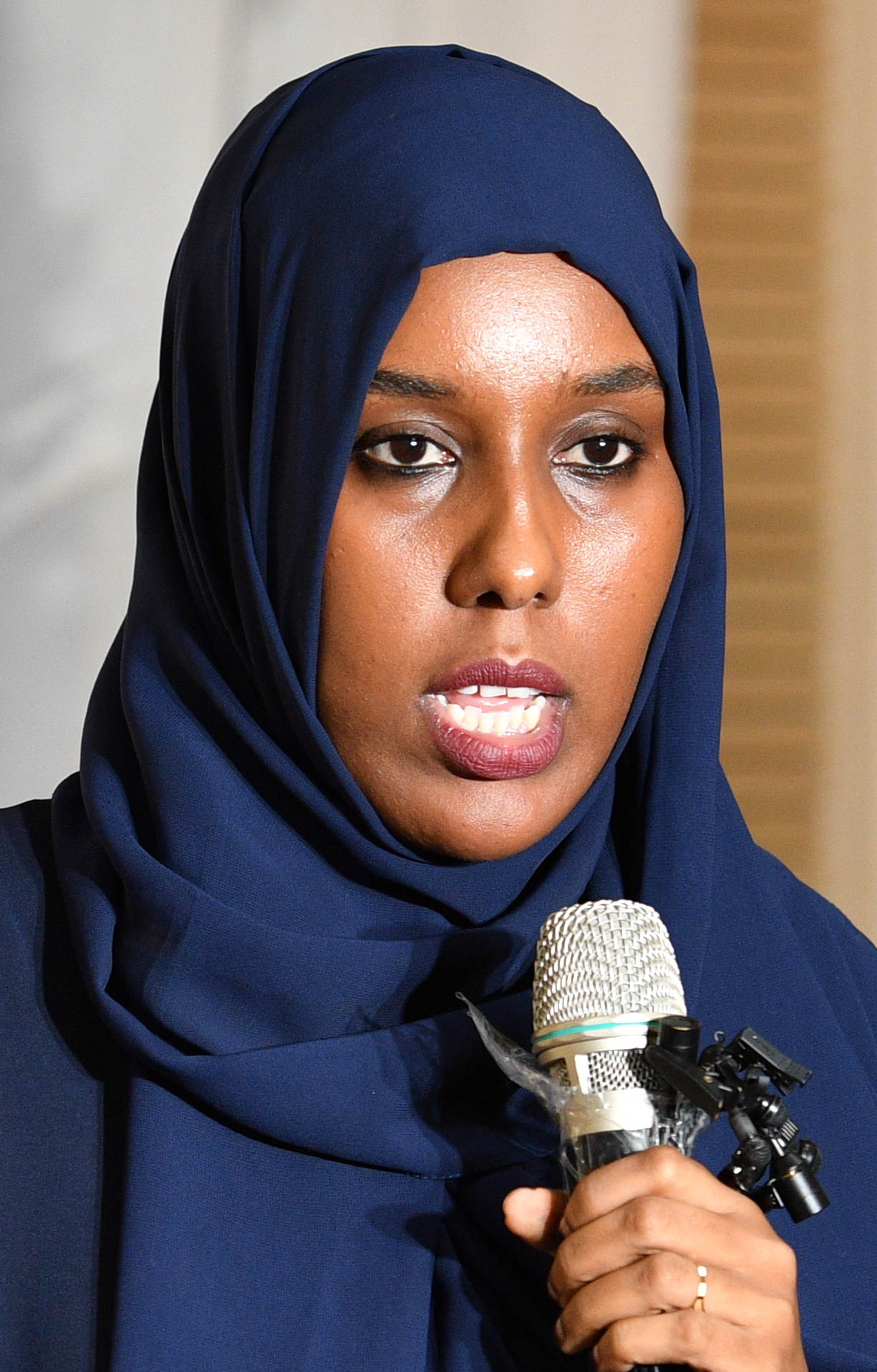
- Haniifa Mohamed Ibrahim in 2021
- Born: 25 June 1991 (age 35)
- Other name: “Hanifa Habsade”
- Occupation: Politician
- Known for: Minister of Women and Human Rights Development

Haniifa Mohamed Ibrahim known as Hanifa Habsade (born 25 June 1991) was a Somali Minister of Women and Human Rights Development. She later joined the board of the Central Bank of Somalia.

== Life ==
She was born in 1991 and she became a member of Somalia's parliament in 2016. She was the first in an all female election as her country aimed to increase the percentage of women to 30%.

In 2017 she was part of the seventeen strong group of politicians drawn from Somalia's lower and upper houses of parliament whose task was to choose Somalia's president. She became the Minister of Women and Human Rights Development under Prime Minister Abdihakin Ashkir in Somalia.

In 2021 she opened a centre in Mogadishu to support women. This was in support of the target to get 30% women in politics. In discussion with UN envoy James C. Swan she raised the issue of United Nations support for the 30% target in 2021.

In January 2025 Hanifa Mohamed Ibrahim, who had been a Senior Advisor to the Speaker of the Federal Parliament of Somalia, was elected by the Council of Ministers to join the board of the State-owned Central Bank of Somalia.
