= Oliver S. Crosby =

American diplomat

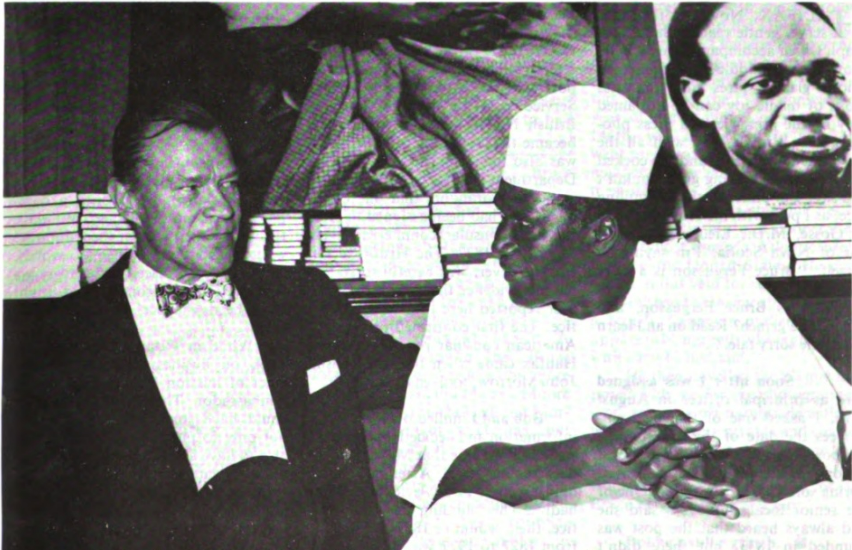
- US Ambassador Oliver S. Crosby and President Ahmed Sekou Toure in 1978

US Ambassador to Guinea
- In office October 27, 1977 – August 1, 1980
- President: Jimmy Carter
- Preceded by: William C. Harrop
- Succeeded by: Allen C. Davis

Personal details
- Born: April 27, 1920 Philadelphia, Pennsylvania, United States
- Died: October 25, 2014 (aged 94) Scarborough, Maine, United States

Oliver Sexsmith "Mike" Crosby (April 27, 1920 – October 25, 2014) was an American diplomat who served as United States Ambassador to Guinea. He was the son of the classicist Henry Lamar Crosby.

== Early life and education ==
The son of Henry Lamar Crosby, Oliver S. Crosby was born April 27, 1920, in Philadelphia. He received a B.A. from the University of Pennsylvania in 1946, where he was the last member of the Zelosophic Society, and an M.A. from Johns Hopkins University 1947. From 1942 to 1946 he served in the United States Navy.

Between 1952 and 1953 Crosby studied German at Harvard University and, from 1964 to 1965 took additional courses at the National War College.

== Career ==
Crosby joined the U.S. Foreign Service in 1947 and served as a consular officer in Athens until 1950. From 1950 to 1952, he was political officer in Tabriz and, for the five years following, served as transportation officer, then economic officer, for the United States embassy in Berlin. Crosby served at the U.S. Department of State in Washington, D.C. from 1958 to 1962 as an intelligence research specialist before returning abroad as a political officer in Nicosia. From 1965 to 1968, Crosby was deputy chief of mission in Bamako, then country director for southern African affairs at the State Department from 1968 to 1972, and from 1972 until his 1977 appointment as United States Ambassador to Guinea, was deputy chief of mission in Lagos. Prior to his appointment as ambassador to Guinea, Crosby was nominated as ambassador to Madagascar, however, that nomination was ultimately withdrawn due to worsening U.S. relations with Madagascar. His tenure as ambassador to Guinea lasted from 1977 to 1980.

== Personal life ==
In 1980, Crosby retired to Maine. He was twice married and had three children.
