= Michael R. Arietti =

American diplomat

Michael Ray Arietti
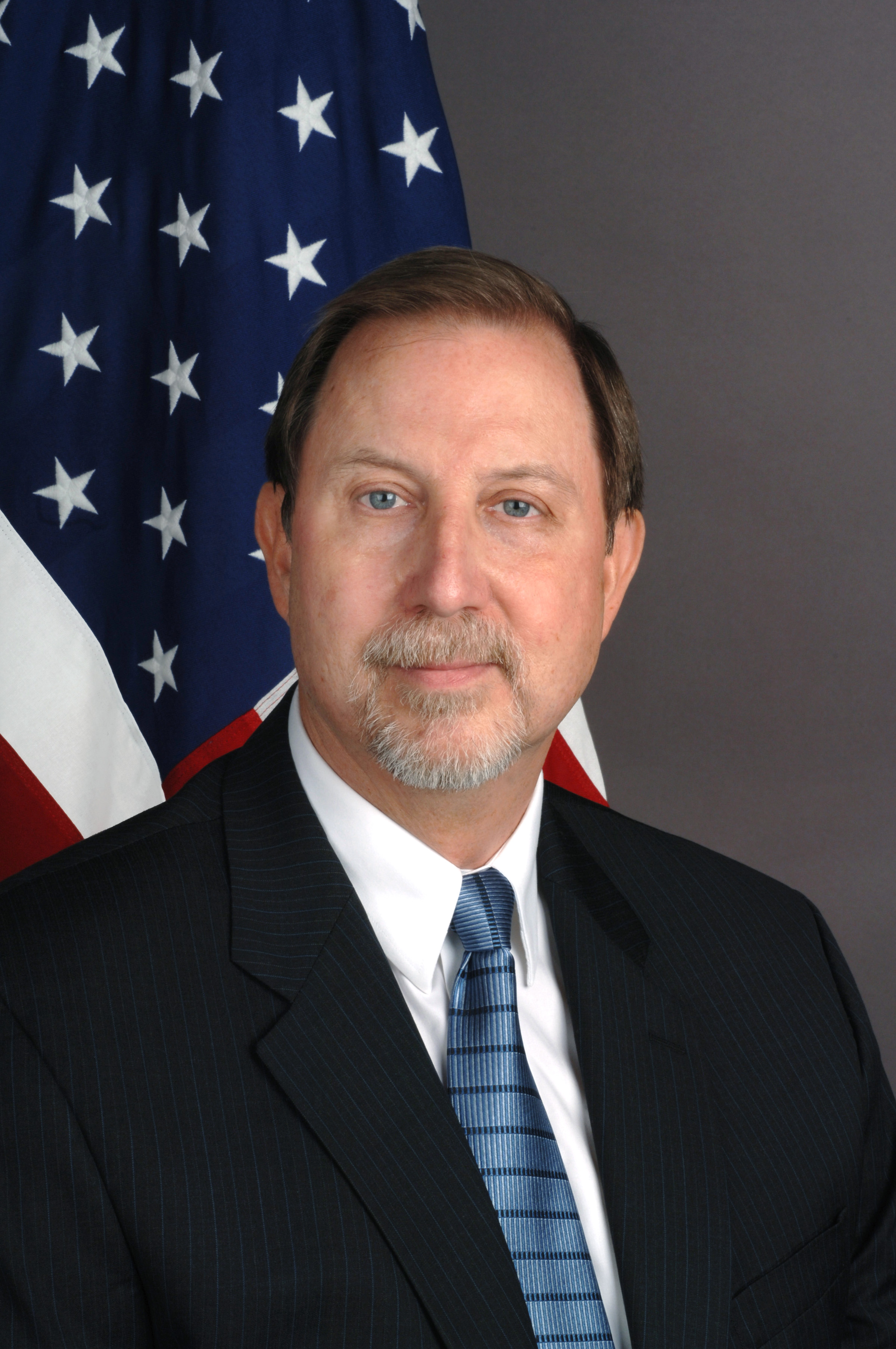

15th United States Ambassador to Rwanda
- In office December 5, 2005 – July 19, 2008
- Preceded by: Margaret K. McMillion
- Succeeded by: W. Stuart Symington

Personal details
- Born: October 25, 1947 (age 78) Los Angeles County, California, U.S.
- Education: Johns Hopkins University

Michael Ray Arietti (born October 25, 1947) is a United States diplomat and a career foreign service officer with the U.S. Department of State. He served as United States Ambassador to Rwanda from 2005 to 2008.

== Early life and education ==
Raised in Enfield, Connecticut, Arietti graduated from Enfield High School in 1965. He received a B.A. from Johns Hopkins University in 1970.

== Career ==
After graduating college, he volunteered for the Peace Corps and served in India before joining the Department of State.

== Awards and Recognitions ==
In 2009 he was given the State Department's Charles E. Cobb Jr. Award for Initiative and Success in Trade Development in recognition of his work in Rwanda.

== Personal life ==
Arietti is the son of Michael John Arietti and Margaret M. (Schiller) Arietti. Arietti's father served in the Marine Corps during World War II and the couple were married on November 20, 1945 in California. The couple moved back near his father's family in Connecticut in 1948. They had two sons and three grandchildren. His mother was the first female police officer in Enfield, Connecticut.

Diplomatic posts
Preceded by Margaret K. McMillion	United States Ambassador to Rwanda; 2005–2008	Succeeded by W. Stuart Symington
