= W. Stuart Symington (diplomat) =

American diplomat

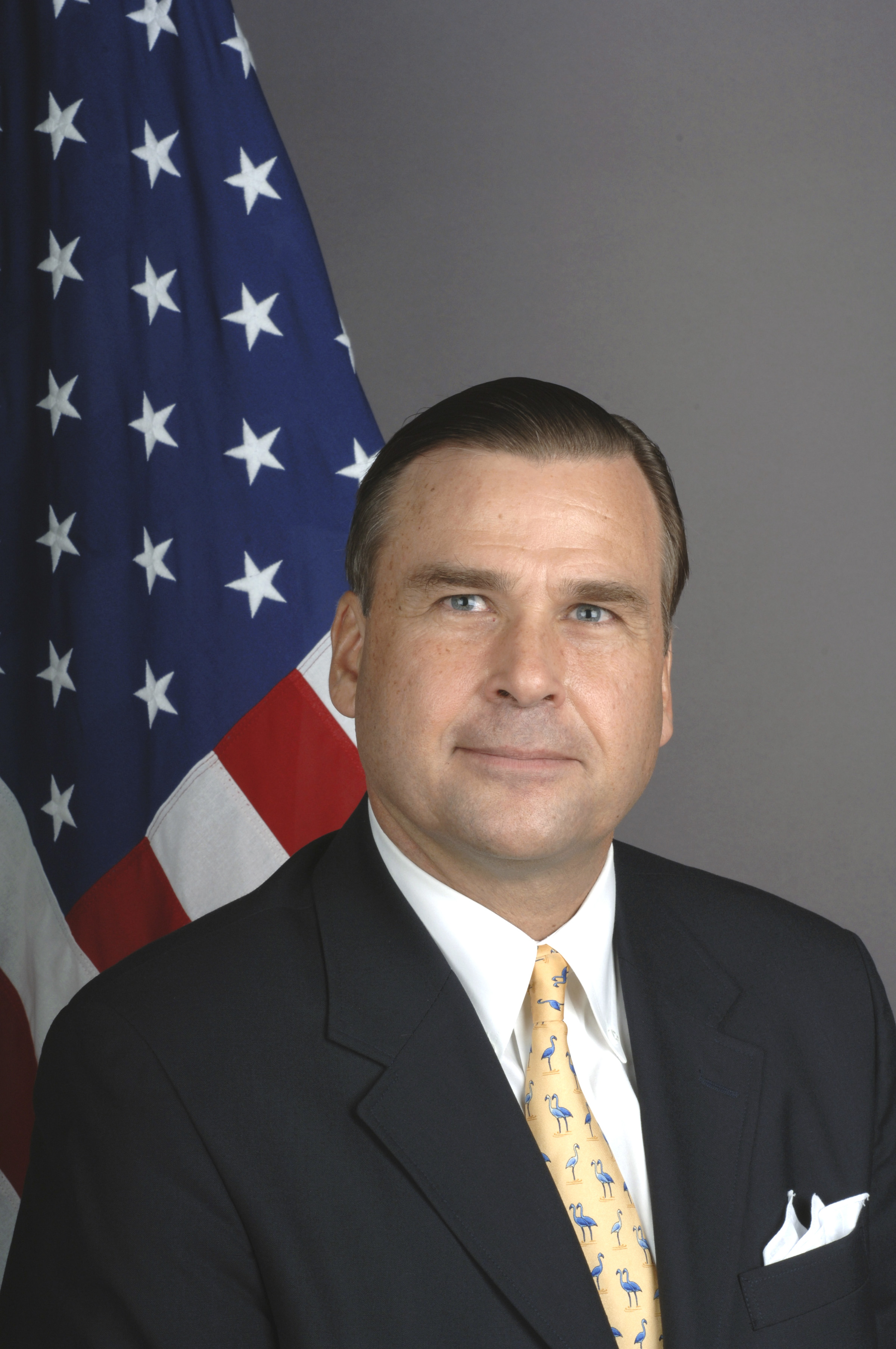
- Symington in 2006

United States Ambassador to Nigeria
- In office December 1, 2016 – August 30, 2019
- President: Barack Obama; Donald Trump
- Preceded by: James F. Entwistle
- Succeeded by: Mary Beth Leonard

Deputy Assistant Secretary and United States Special Representative for the Central African Republic
- In office April 21, 2014 – September 2016
- President: Barack Obama
- Preceded by: Position established
- Succeeded by: vacant

United States Ambassador to Rwanda
- In office November 3, 2008 – July 5, 2011
- President: George W. Bush; Barack Obama
- Preceded by: Michael R. Arietti
- Succeeded by: Donald Koran

United States Ambassador to Djibouti
- In office September 18, 2006 – May 31, 2008
- President: George W. Bush
- Preceded by: Marguerita Ragsdale
- Succeeded by: James C. Swan

Personal details
- Born: William Stuart Symington IV; 1952 (age 73–74)
- Spouse: Susan Ide
- Relatives: Stuart Symington (grandfather)
- Education: Brown University; Columbia Law School

William Stuart Symington IV (born 1952) is a career diplomat for the United States. He served as the United States Special Envoy for South Sudan from January 2020 to February 2021. Previously, he served as ambassador to Djibouti, Nigeria, and Rwanda, among other posts.

== Biography ==
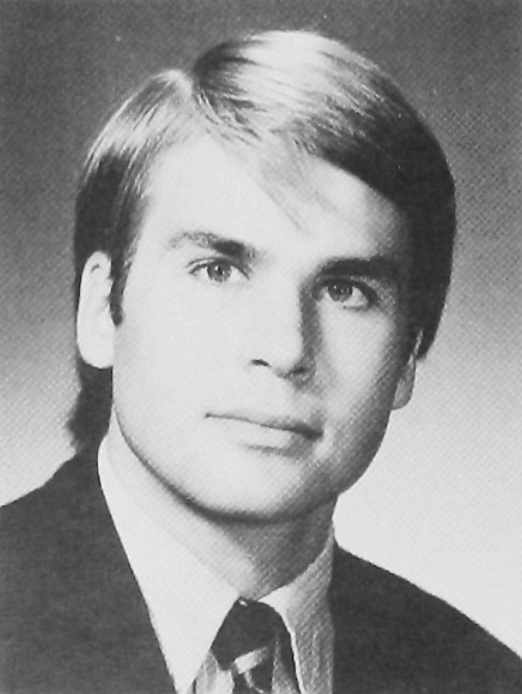
Symington in the Brown University yearbook, 1974

Symington graduated from John Burroughs School in Ladue, Missouri, in 1970. He received a B.A. from Brown University and a J.D. from Columbia Law School.

He practiced law in Missouri, New York, London, and Paris.

Symington joined the U.S. State Department and served in Ecuador, Mexico, Spain, and Honduras and as a Pearson Fellow in the office of U.S. Congressman Ike Skelton.

His next postings were as Deputy Chief of Mission and Chargé d'Affaires in Niger (2001-03), Deputy Director of the State Department's Office of West African Affairs (2003-05), and Political Officer at the U.S. Embassy in Baghdad, Iraq (2004-05). He then served as the United States Department of State's representative at the Joint Forces Staff College in Norfolk, Virginia, from 2005 to 2006.

Symington received his first appointment as ambassador in 2006, to Djibouti, where he served until 2008. He then served as ambassador to Rwanda from 2008 to 2011.

His next posts were Political Advisor to the Commander of NORAD/U.S. Northern Command (2011–14), U.S. Special Representative for the Central African Republic (2014-16), and Deputy Assistant Secretary of State for Central Africa and African Security Affairs (2015-16).

Symington served again as U.S. ambassador, to the Federal Republic of Nigeria from 2016 to 2019. From January 2020 to February 2021, he served as U.S. Special Envoy for South Sudan.

He and his spouse Susan Ide Symington have been married for 40 years. A member of the Symington family, he is the grandson of Senator Stuart Symington.

Diplomatic posts
Preceded by Michael Arietti	United States Ambassador to Djibouti; 2006–2008	Succeeded by Donald Koran
Preceded by Marguerita Ragsdale	United States Ambassador to Rwanda; 2008–2011	Succeeded by James Swan
Preceded by James F. Entwistle	United States Ambassador to Nigeria; 2016–2019	Succeeded by Mary Beth Leonard
New office	United States Special Representative for the Central African Republic; 2014–2016	Vacant
