= Robert H. McBride =

American diplomat

Robert Henry McBride (May 25, 1918 – December 26, 1983) was an American diplomat. He served as United States Ambassador to the Democratic Republic of the Congo from 1967 to 1969 and as United States Ambassador to Mexico from 1969 to 1974.

== Biography ==
=== Early life ===
Robert Henry McBride was born in England to American parents, and attended schools in Spain and France. As a result, he spoke French and Spanish fluently. He graduated from Princeton University in 1940.

=== Career ===
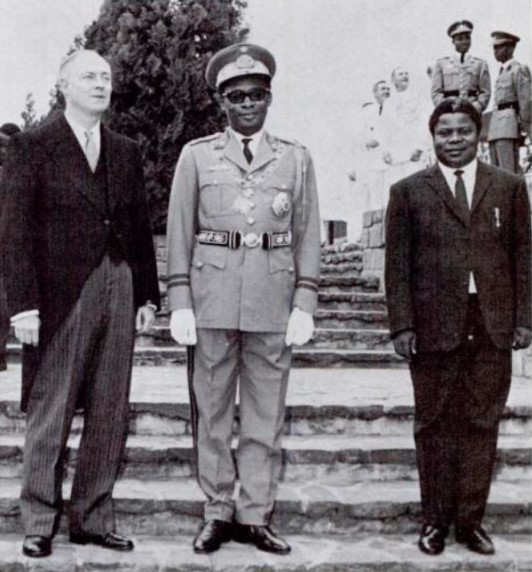
McBride (left) with Congolese President Joseph-Désiré Mobutu and Foreign Minister Justin Marie Bomboko shortly after presenting his credentials as Ambassador to the Congo, 1967

He joined the United States Foreign Service in 1941, and served in embassies in Havana, Algiers, Naples, Port-au-Prince, Rabat, Paris and Madrid. He served as Ambassador to the Democratic Republic of the Congo from 1967 to 1969, and to Mexico from 1969 to 1974.

In 1974, he became a diplomat-in-residence at the University of Virginia in Charlottesville, Virginia. He sat on the board of directors of the Inter-American Council for Immigration and Development.

=== Personal life ===
He was married to Jacqueline McBride, and they had three children.

== Bibliography ==
- Mexico and the United States (editor; Englewood Cliffs, N.J.: Prentice Hall, 1981)

Diplomatic posts
Preceded by G. McMurtrie Godley	United States Ambassador to the Democratic Republic of the Congo; 1967–1969	Succeeded by Sheldon B. Vance
Preceded by Fulton Freeman	United States Ambassador to Mexico; 1969–1974	Succeeded by Joseph J. Jova
