= Raisedon Zenenga =

Zimbabwean diplomat

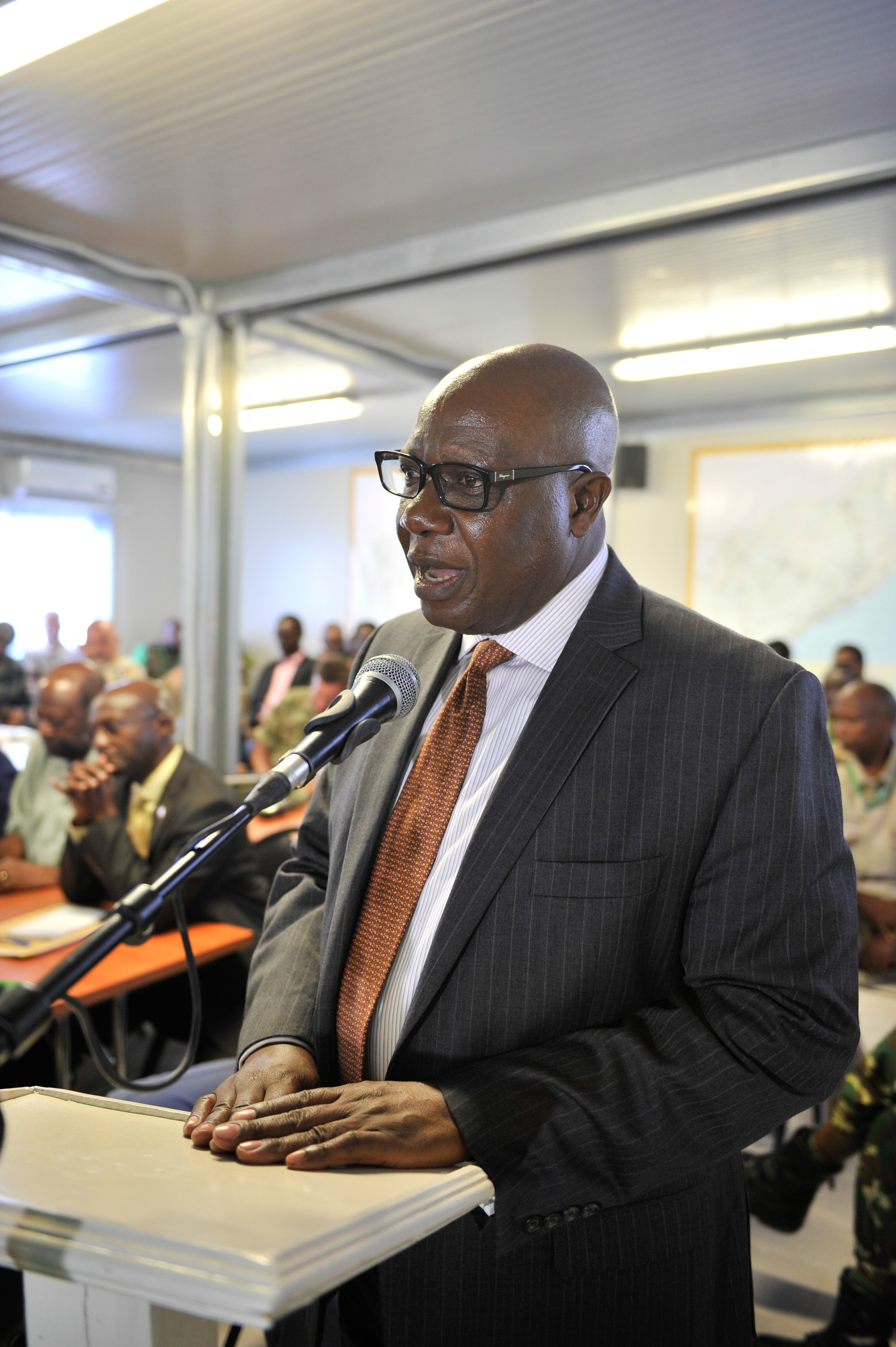
Raisedon Zenenga, at joint SNA and AMISOM conference in 2016

Raisedon Zenenga is a Zimbabwean diplomat who has been serving as Deputy Special Representative of United Nations Secretary-General António Guterres in the United Nations Assistance Mission in Somalia (UNSOM) since 2024, working alongside Catriona Laing.

== Early life and education ==
Zenenga graduated from the University of Zimbabwe, where he studied public administration and political science.

== Career ==
Zenenga began his professional career in Zimbabwe’s diplomatic service.

After moving to the United Nations, Zenenga also served in senior roles at the organization’s headquarters supporting peacekeeping operations in Africa.

Under the leadership of Hilde Frafjord Johnson, Zenenga was the United Nations Deputy Special Representative in South Sudan (-2014) and the Deputy Special Representative for Somalia (2014–2020).

Under the leadership of Stephanie Turco Williams (2020), Ján Kubiš (2021–2022) and Abdoulaye Bathily (2022–2023), Zenenga was the Deputy Special Representative of the Secretary-General in Libya, where he also served as Assistant Secretary-General and Mission Coordinator of the United Nations Support Mission in Libya (UNSMIL).
