= James F. Entwistle =

American diplomat to Africa (born 1956)

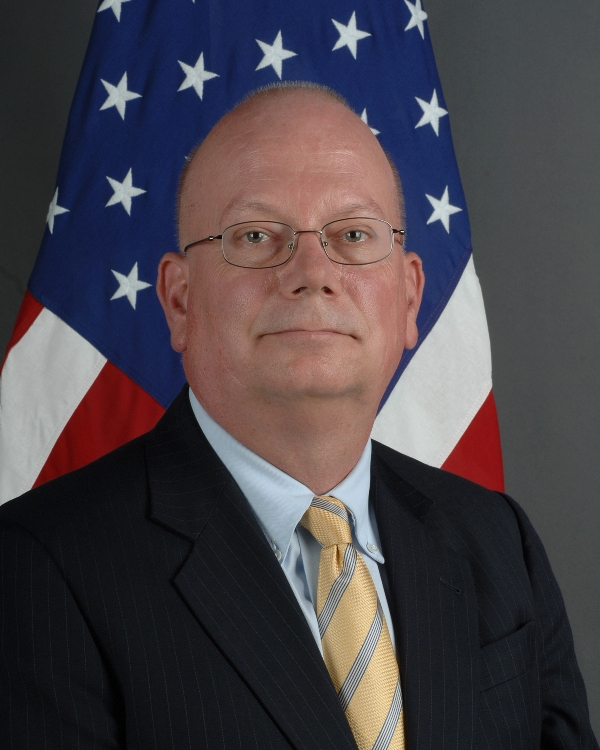

United States Ambassador to Nigeria
- In office November 26, 2013 – October 2016
- President: Barack Obama
- Preceded by: Terence McCulley
- Succeeded by: W. Stuart Symington

United States Ambassador to the Democratic Republic of the Congo
- In office November 4, 2010 – August 10, 2013
- President: Barack Obama
- Preceded by: Samuel Laeuchli
- Succeeded by: James Swan

Personal details
- Born: 1956 (age 69–70)
- Education: Davidson College

James F. Entwistle (born 1956) was the United States Ambassador to Nigeria from October 28, 2013, to October 2016. From 2010 until 2013 he was the ambassador to the Democratic Republic of the Congo. He is a career Foreign Service Officer. He was Deputy Chief of Mission at the U.S. Embassy in Bangkok, Thailand from July 2007 and was Deputy Chief of Mission at the U.S. Embassy in Colombo, Sri Lanka from 2004 until 2006 ("with simultaneous accreditation to Maldives").

== Biography ==
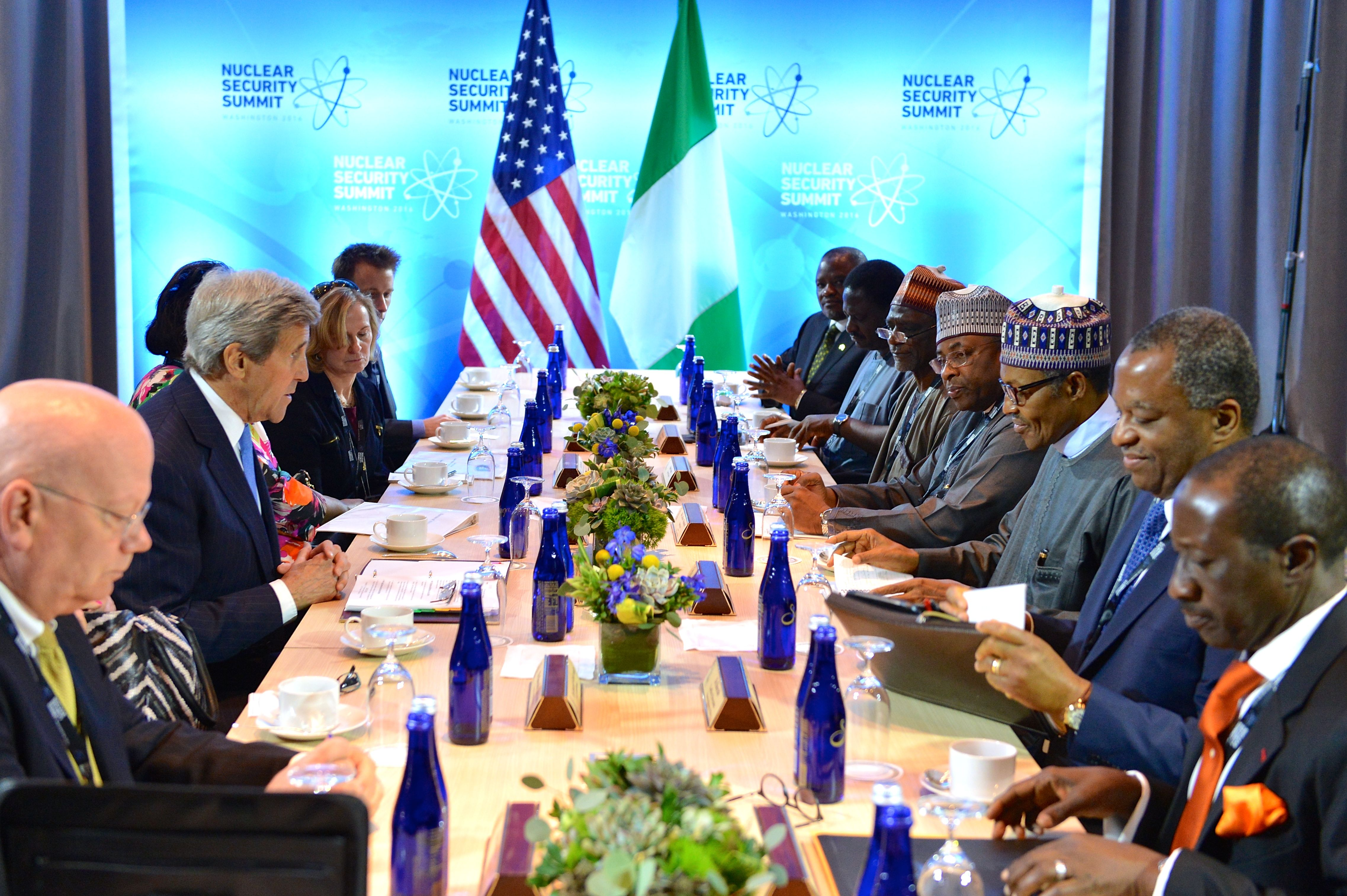
Entwistle, far left, meets with African leaders at the 2016 Nuclear Security Summit in Washington

Entwistle graduated from Davidson College in North Carolina. He joined the Foreign Service in 1981 and worked in Yaounde, Douala and Niamey from 1981 until 1986. He was a watch officer in the Bureau of Intelligence and Research and the desk officer for Kenya and Uganda in the Bureau of African Affairs from 1986 until 1990 and headed the Refugee Assistance Unit at Embassy Bangkok from 1991 until 1994. He was Deputy Chief of Mission in Bangui from 1994 until 1995 and was in the Bureau of Consular Affairs until his assignment as Counselor for Political Affairs at the U.S. Embassy in Kuala Lumpur, Malaysia from 1999 until 2003.

He was Deputy Chief of Mission at the U.S. Embassy in Bangkok, Thailand from July 2007 and was Deputy Chief of Mission at the U.S. Embassy in Colombo, Sri Lanka from 2004 until 2006 ("with simultaneous accreditation to Maldives").

From 2010 until 2013 he was the ambassador to the Democratic Republic of the Congo. He is the U.S. ambassador to Benin Republic as of October 28, 2013.

== Personal life ==
He speaks French, Thai and some pidgin. He is married to Pamela G. Schmoll and has two children.

== See also ==
- Ambassadors of the United States

Diplomatic posts
Preceded by Samuel Laeuchli	United States Ambassador to the Democratic Republic of the Congo; 2010–2011	Succeeded by James Swan
Preceded by Terence McCulley	United States Ambassador to Nigeria; 2013–2016	Succeeded by W. Stuart Symington
