= Edmund A. Gullion =

American diplomat

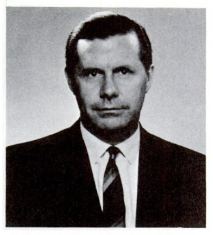

Ambassador to the Republic of the Congo
- In office August 3, 1961 – February 20, 1964
- President: John F. Kennedy
- Preceded by: Clare H. Timberlake
- Succeeded by: G. McMurtrie Godley

Personal details
- Born: March 2, 1913
- Died: March 17, 1998 (aged 85)

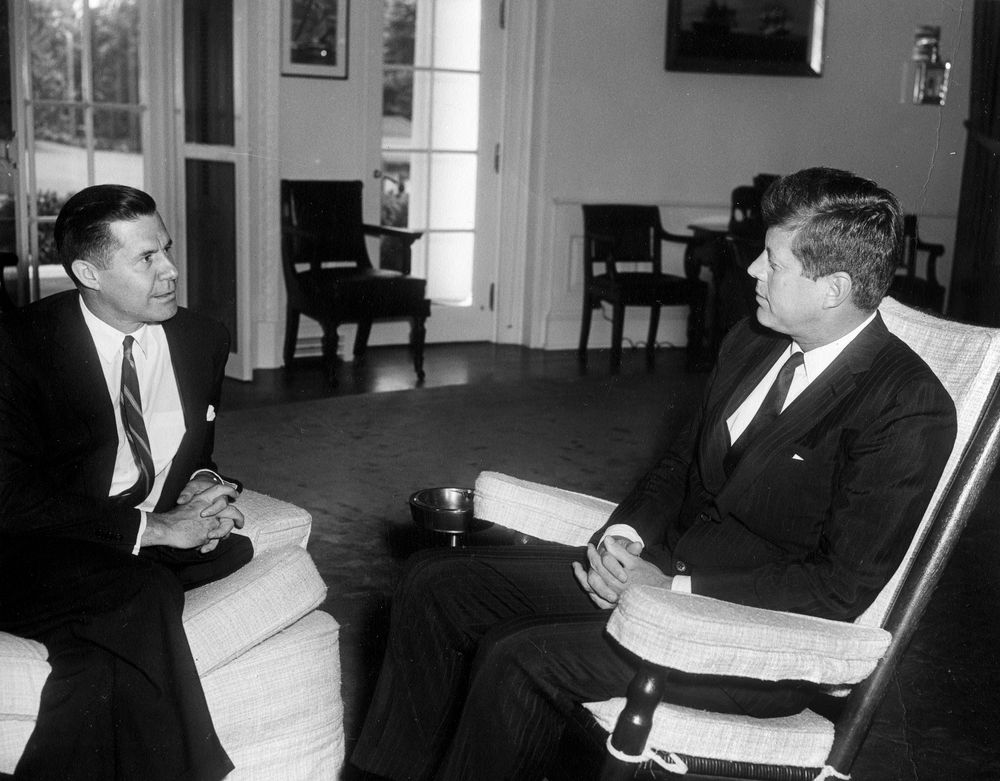
Gullion (left) meeting with President John F. Kennedy in 1961

Edmund Asbury Gullion (March 2, 1913 Lexington, Kentucky - March 17, 1998 Winchester, Massachusetts) was an American diplomat. He served as dean of the Fletcher School of Law and Diplomacy (1964–1978) and “one of the country's most accomplished career ambassadors.”

Gullion’s last post in the State Department was as the United States Ambassador to the recently independent Congo, described as “a flashpoint of the cold war.” His first diplomatic mission was in Marseilles as a deputy consul in 1937. He was in the Congo from 1961 until 1964. He was also Chargé d'Affaires ad interim to Finland when the United States severed diplomatic relations with Finland on June 30, 1944, and Deputy Director of the U.S. Disarmament Administration (1960–1961). Gullion was stationed not only in Helsinki during WWII but also Salonika, Greece “ where he witnessed the entry of German troops into both areas and coordinated the departure of American citizens and diplomatic staff.” When he finished at the National War College, he spent three years as Consul General and Counselor of the U.S. Embassy in Saigon, Vietnam, during the war in Indochina.

While he was in the Congo, what was termed as the "Congo crisis" was happening when the United Nations attempted to prevent the secession of the Katanga Province. Gullion and his staff were awarded for their work.

He graduated from Princeton University in 1935 and from the National War College in 1949.

Gullion died at his home of a heart attack.
