= Amelia Ellen Shippy =

American diplomat

Amelia Ellen Shippy (born October 23, 1944 Denver, Colorado) was the American Ambassador Extraordinary and Plenipotentiary to Malawi (1998–2000).

Shippy was raised in Silver City, New Mexico. She has a B.S. degree from the University of New Mexico (1966) and a J.D. degree from George Washington University (1977).
