= Sheldon B. Vance =

American diplomat (1917–1995)

Sheldon Vance
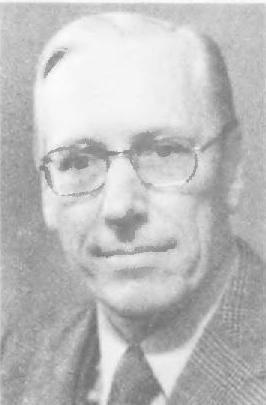

US Ambassador to Zaire
- In office May 27, 1969 – March 26, 1974
- President: Richard Nixon
- Preceded by: Robert McBride
- Succeeded by: Deane Hinton

US Ambassador to Chad
- In office May 10, 1967 – May 16, 1969
- President: Lyndon B. Johnson
- Preceded by: Brewster Morris
- Succeeded by: Terence Todman

Personal details
- Born: January 18, 1917 Crookston, Minnesota, United States
- Died: November 12, 1995 (aged 78) Bethesda, United States
- Spouse: Jean Chambers
- Children: Robert Vance; Stephen Vance
- Education: Carleton College; Harvard Law School

Sheldon Baird Vance (January 18, 1917 – November 12, 1995), born in Crookston, Minnesota, was the U.S. Ambassador to Zaire from May 27, 1969, through March 26, 1974.

== Early career and ambassadorships ==
Vance graduated from Carleton College with a Bachelor of art and a Bachelor of Law from Harvard University. Early in his career, He joined the Foreign Service in 1942 and served in Rio de Janeiro, Nice, Monaco, Martinique, Brussels, and Addis Ababa. From 1961 to 1962, Vance was the Director of the Office of Central African Affairs. He also worked as a Senior Foreign Service Inspector, inspecting posts to report on their status to the Department of State. From 1967 to 1969, Vance served as the US Ambassador to Chad.

From 1969 to 1974, Vance was the US ambassador to Zaire. During his tenure, he developed a close relationship with President Mobutu Sese Seko, and became an ardent and vocal supporter of the President; he also supported Mobutu's aspirations for regional leadership and advocated foreign investment in Zaire and "strongly recommended" that the U.S. sell M-16s to Mobutu. According to diplomats stationed in Zaire at the time, Vance "would not permit negative analyses of the Mobutu regime to be transmitted to Washington." Vance's support of Mobutu continued even after he left Zaire; shortly after retiring from the State Department, he joined a law firm representing the Zairian government. He was also briefly sent back to Zaire after his successor, Deane Hinton (who did not get along with Mobutu) was declared persona non grata, to patch up the American-Zairian relationship, which had soured considerably during Hinton's tenure.

== Life after Zaire ==
Vance served as senior adviser to the secretary of state, coordinator for international narcotics matters, and executive director of the President's Cabinet Committee on International Narcotics Control (1974–1977). After retiring from the Foreign Service in 1977, he practiced international law in the Washington, D.C. law firm of Vance, Joyce, Carbaugh and Fields (1977–1989). In later years, the Vances lived in Chevy Chase, Maryland. Vance died in Bethesda, Maryland in 1995 at the age of 78.

== Family life ==
His parents were Erskine Ward and Helen (Baird) Vance. He married Jean Chambers on December 28, 1939; they had two sons, Robert Clarke and Stephen Baird.

== Education ==
High School: Austin High School, Austin, MN (1935)
University: BA, Carleton College (1939)
Law School: Harvard University (1942)

== Notable assignments ==
- US Official Cabinet Committee, International Narcotics Control (1974–77)
- US ambassador to Zaire (1969–74)
- US ambassador to Chad (1967–69)
- US official senior foreign service inspector (1966–67)
- US official deputy chief of mission, US embassy, Ethiopia (1962–66)
- US official director, Office of Central African Affairs (1961–62)
- US official Bureau of Africa, Middle East, and South Asia (1958–60)
- US official first secretary, US embassy, Brussels (1954–58)
- US official Belgium-Luxembourg desk officer, Washington (1952–54)
- US official desk officer, Switzerland (1951–52)
- US official consul, US Embassy, Martinique (1949–51)
- US official vice consul, Nice and Monaco (1946–49)
- US official economic analyst, US embassy, Rio de Janeiro (1942–46)

== Notes ==
Diplomatic posts
Preceded by Robert H. McBride	United States Ambassador to Chad; 1969–1974	Succeeded by Deane R. Hinton
