= List of diplomatic missions of Estonia =

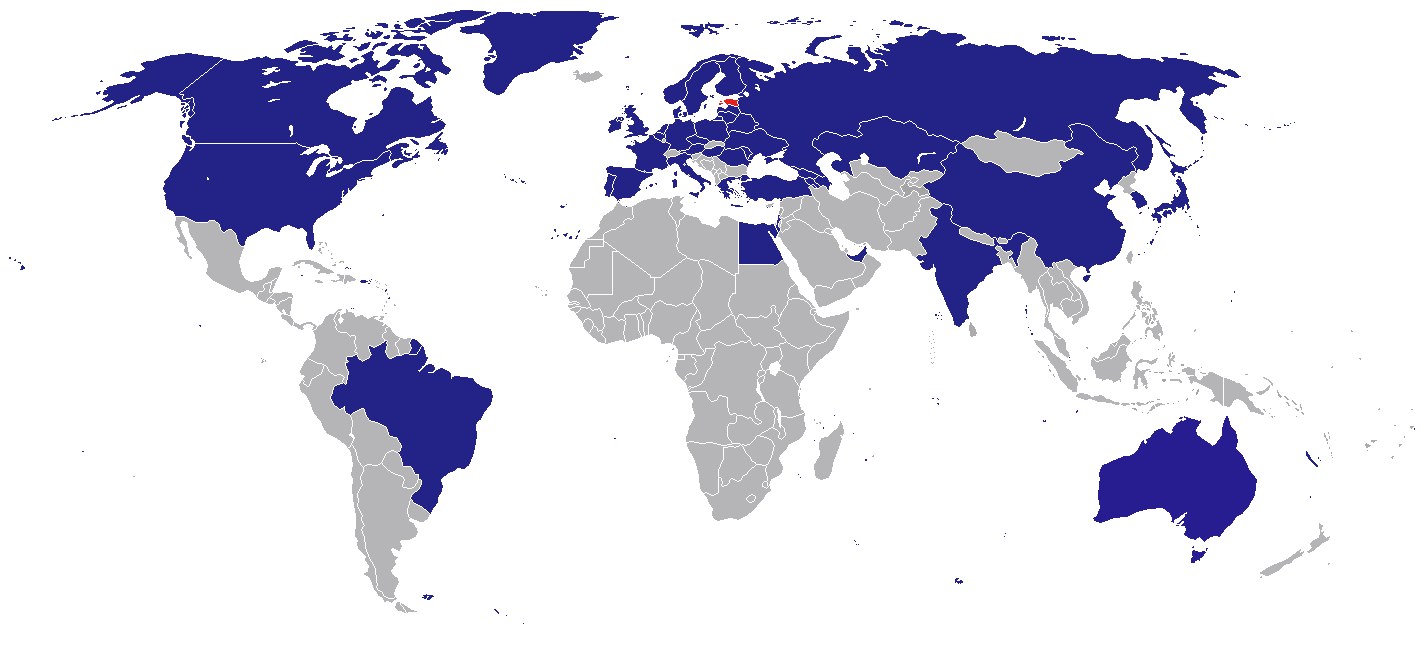
Countries with Estonian diplomatic missions

This is a list of diplomatic missions of Estonia. Estonia reestablished a foreign ministry on 12 April 1990, while the country was slowly restoring independence from the Soviet Union, with the symbols and instruments of sovereignty progressively being reintroduced. The events in August the following year when a coup attempt failed in Moscow accelerated the progress towards independence. The staff of the ministry worked a seven-day work week with threadbare facilities and supplies until January 1992, after they had secured Estonia's international recognition, and opened missions in New York City, Helsinki, Stockholm, Copenhagen, Bonn, Paris, and Moscow.

The Estonian government considers Estonia's incorporation into the Soviet Union illegal, and the foreign ministry to have been in continual operation since 1918.

Estonia and the other Baltic states, together with the Nordic countries have signed a memorandum of understanding on the posting of diplomats at each other's missions abroad, under the auspices of Nordic-Baltic Eight.

As of September 2026, Estonia's diplomatic network comprises 43 embassies and 8 permanent missions/delegations.

== Current missions ==
=== Africa ===
Host country	Host city	Mission	Concurrent accreditation	Ref.
Egypt	Cairo	Embassy	Countries: Ethiopia; Iraq; Jordan; Lebanon; Mali; Oman; Multilateral Organizations: African Union (Note: Accredited as an observer mission.); Arab League	
Kenya	Nairobi	Embassy	Countries: South Africa	

=== Americas ===
Host country	Host city	Mission	Concurrent accreditation	Ref.
Brazil	Brasília	Embassy		
Canada	Ottawa	Embassy		
United States	Washington, D.C.	Embassy	Countries: Mexico; Multilateral Organizations: Organization of American States	

=== Asia ===
Host country	Host city	Mission	Concurrent accreditation	Ref.
Armenia	Yerevan	Embassy		
Azerbaijan	Baku	Embassy		
China	Beijing	Embassy	Countries: Vietnam; Mongolia; Thailand	
Georgia	Tbilisi	Embassy		
India	New Delhi	Embassy	Countries: Bangladesh; Nepal; Sri Lanka	
Israel	Tel Aviv	Embassy		
Japan	Tokyo	Embassy	Countries: Philippines	
Kazakhstan	Astana	Embassy	Countries: Kyrgyzstan; Tajikistan; Turkmenistan; Uzbekistan	
Singapore	Singapore	Embassy	Countries: Brunei; Indonesia; Malaysia; Multilateral Organizations: Association of Southeast Asian Nations	
South Korea	Seoul	Embassy		
Turkey	Ankara	Embassy	Countries: Iran	
United Arab Emirates	Abu Dhabi	Embassy	Countries: Bahrain; Kuwait; Qatar; Saudi Arabia; International Organizations: International Renewable Energy Agency	

=== Europe ===
Host country	Host city	Mission	Concurrent accreditation	Ref.
Austria	Vienna	Embassy	Countries: Slovakia; Switzerland; Multilateral Organizations: International Atomic Energy Agency	
Belarus	Minsk	Embassy		
Belgium	Brussels	Embassy	Countries: Luxembourg	
Czechia	Prague	Embassy	Countries: Croatia; Slovenia	
Denmark	Copenhagen	Embassy		
Finland	Helsinki	Embassy	Countries: Chile	
France	Paris	Embassy	Countries: Monaco; Tunisia	
Germany	Berlin	Embassy		
Greece	Athens	Embassy	Countries: Albania; Cyprus	
Hungary	Budapest	Embassy	Countries: Bosnia Herzegovina; Montenegro; North Macedonia; Serbia	
Ireland	Dublin	Embassy		
Italy	Rome	Embassy	Countries: Malta; San Marino; Multilateral Organizations: Food and Agriculture Organization; Sovereign Entity: Sovereign Military Order of Malta	
Latvia	Riga	Embassy		
Lithuania	Vilnius	Embassy		
Moldova	Chişinău	Embassy		
Netherlands	The Hague	Embassy	Multilateral Organizations: Organisation for the Prohibition of Chemical Weapons	
Norway	Oslo	Embassy	Countries: Iceland	
Poland	Warsaw	Embassy		
Portugal	Lisbon	Embassy		
Romania	Bucharest	Embassy	Countries: Bulgaria	
Russia	Moscow	Embassy		
Spain	Madrid	Embassy	Countries: Algeria; Andorra	
Sweden	Stockholm	Embassy		
Ukraine	Kyiv	Embassy		
United Kingdom	London	Embassy	Multilateral Organizations: International Maritime Organization	

=== Oceania ===
Host country	Host city	Mission	Concurrent accreditation	Ref.
Australia	Canberra	Embassy	Countries: Fiji; New Zealand; Papua New Guinea; Samoa; Tonga; Vanuatu	

=== Multilateral organizations ===
Organization	Host city	Host country	Mission	Concurrent accreditation	Ref.
Council of Europe	Strasbourg	France	Permanent Mission		
European Union	Brussels	Belgium	Permanent Mission		
NATO	Brussels	Belgium	Permanent Representation		
OECD	Paris	France	Permanent Mission		
United Nations	Geneva	Switzerland	Permanent Mission	Multilateral Organizations: World Trade Organization	
United Nations	New York City	United States	Permanent Mission	Countries: Guatemala	
OSCE	Vienna	Austria	Permanent Mission		
UNESCO	Paris	France	Permanent Mission		

== Gallery ==
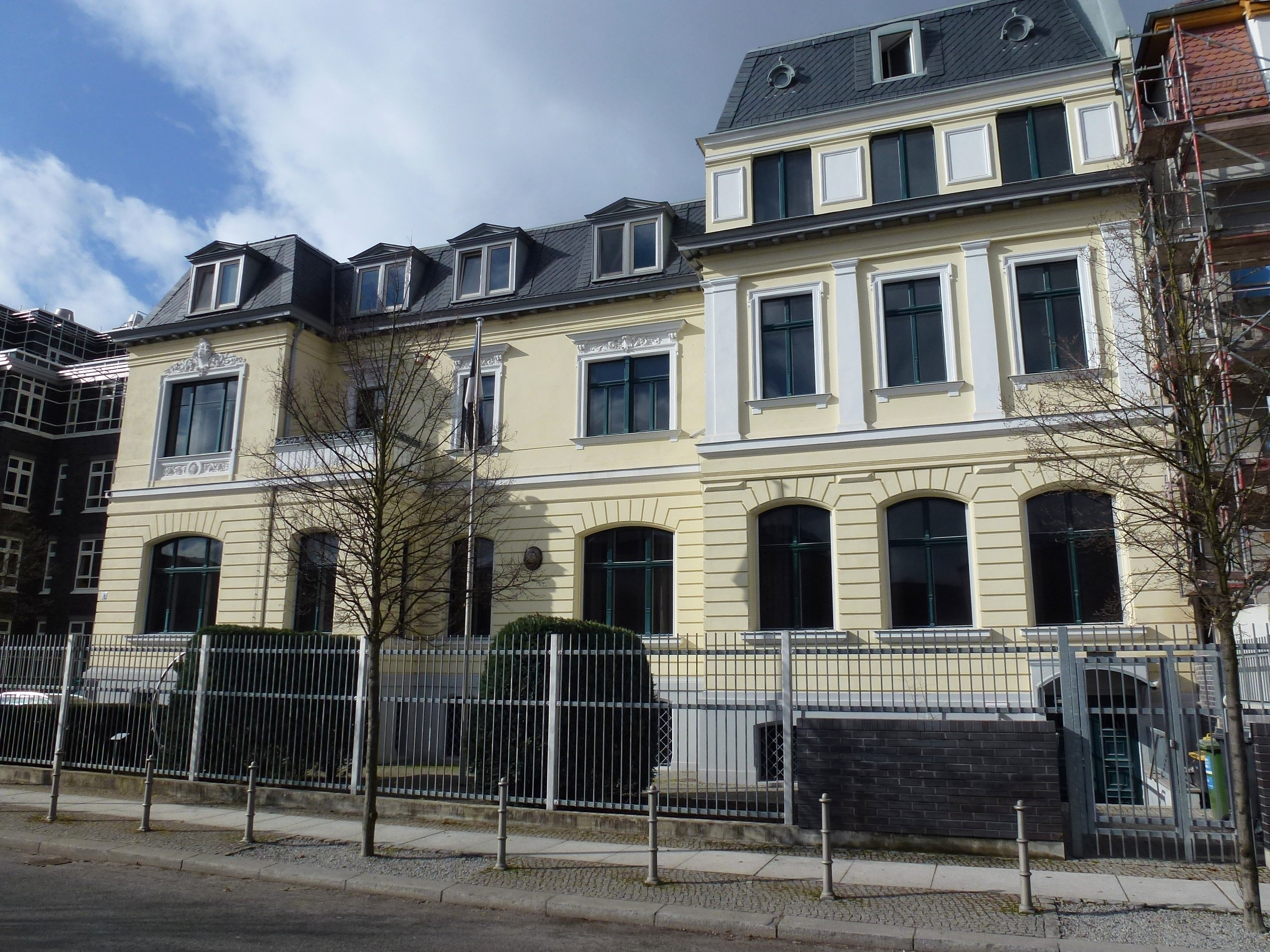
Embassy in Berlin

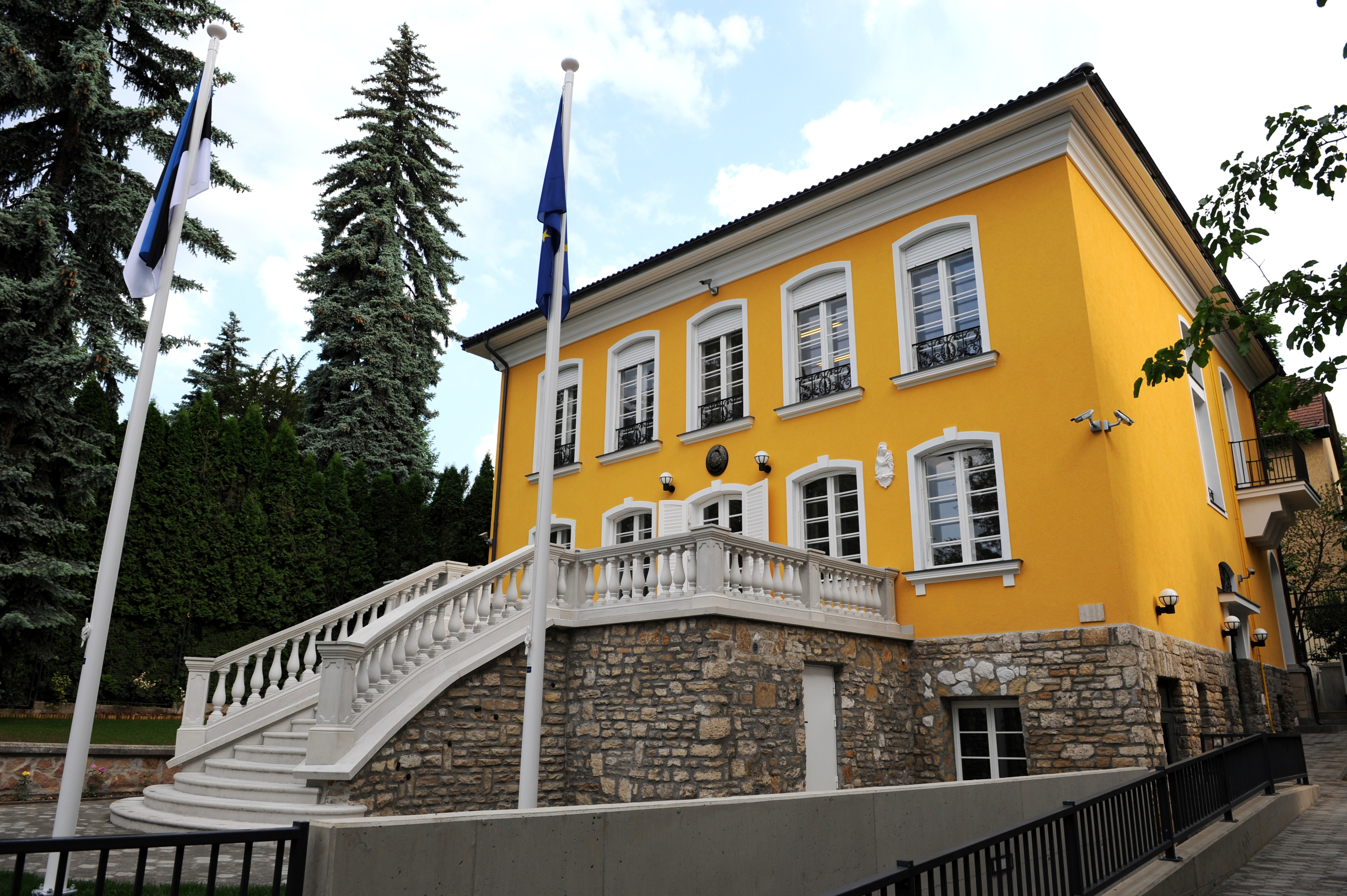
Embassy in Budapest

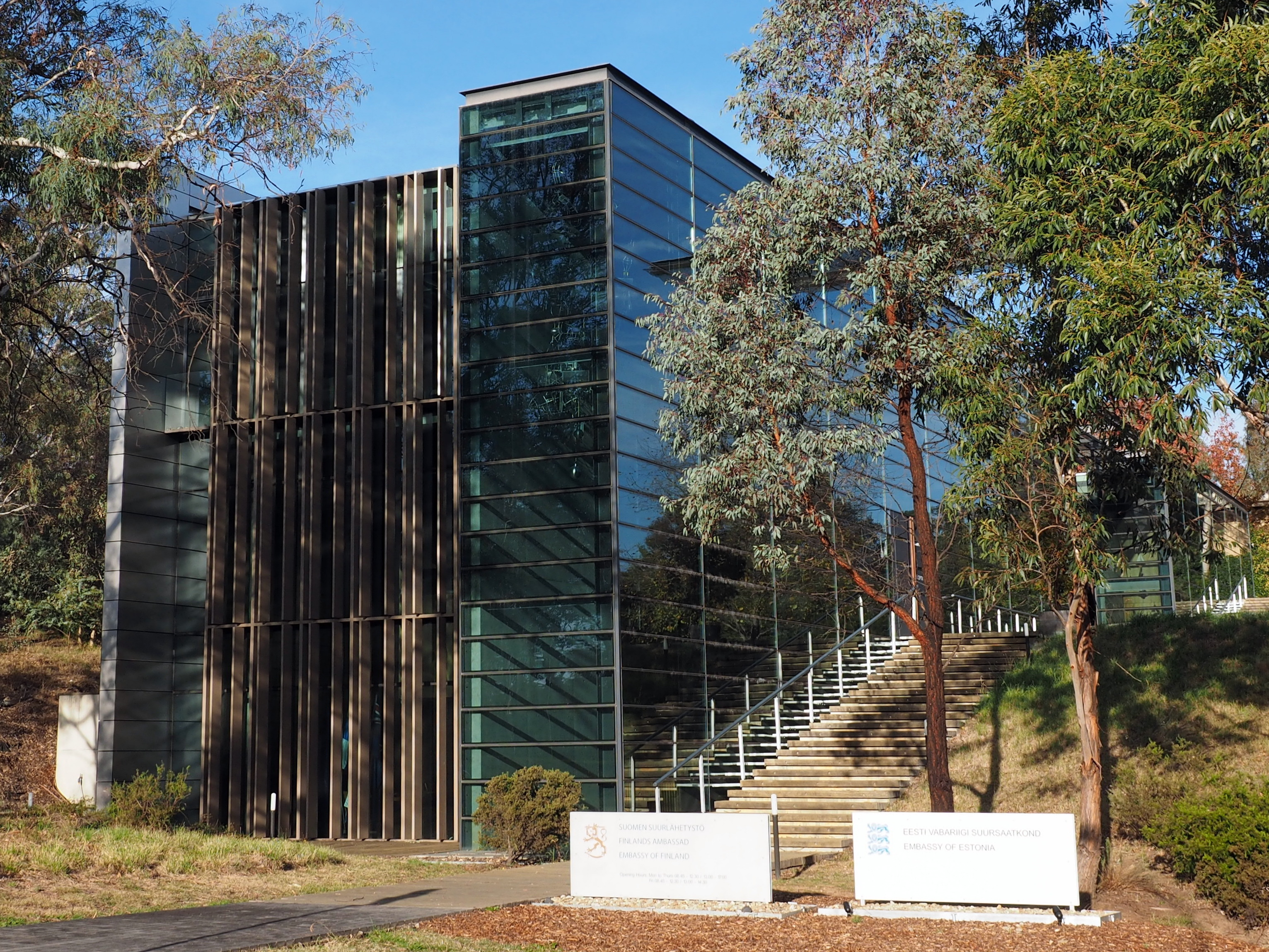
Building hosting the Embassy in Canberra

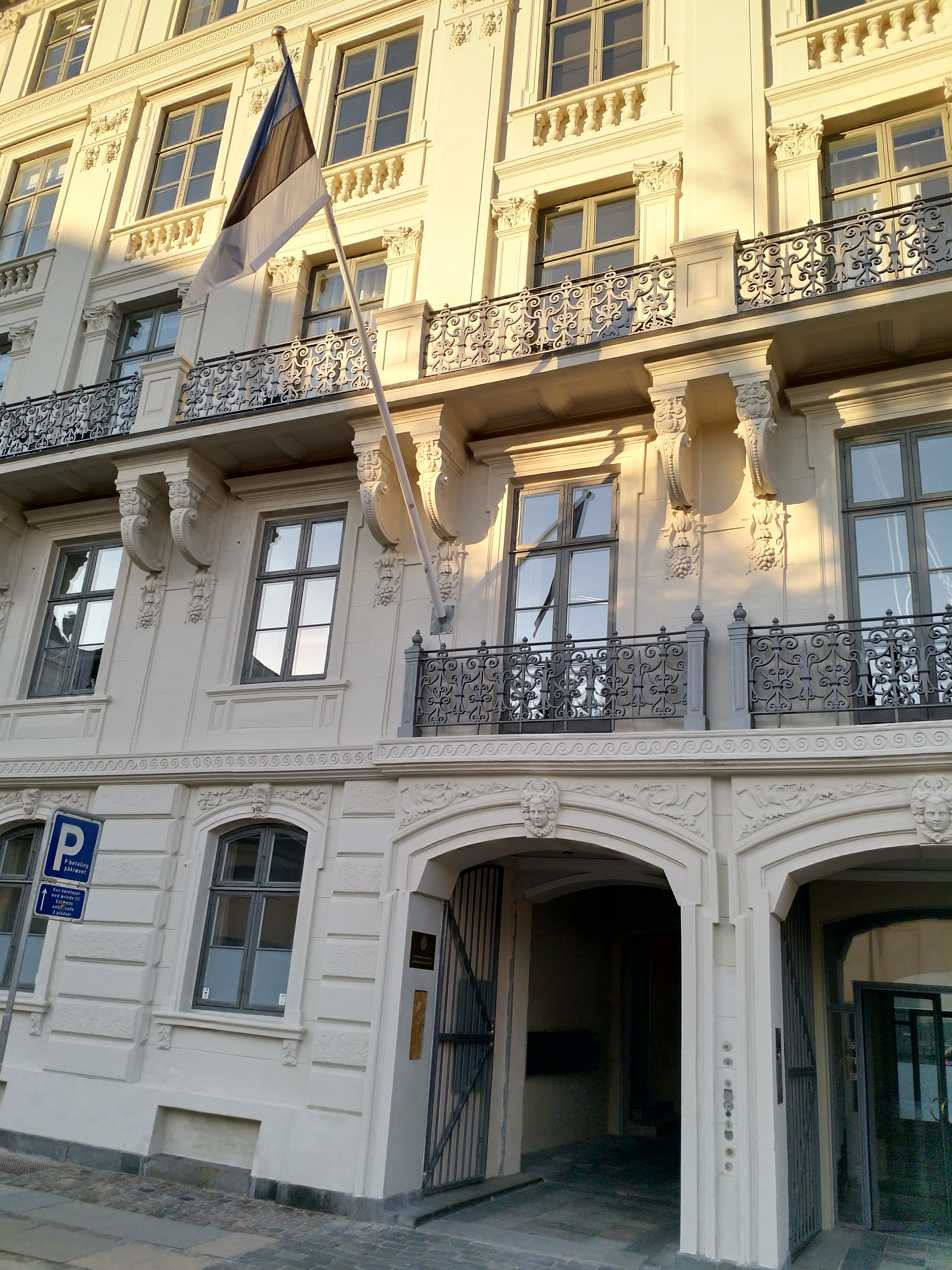
Embassy in Copenhagen

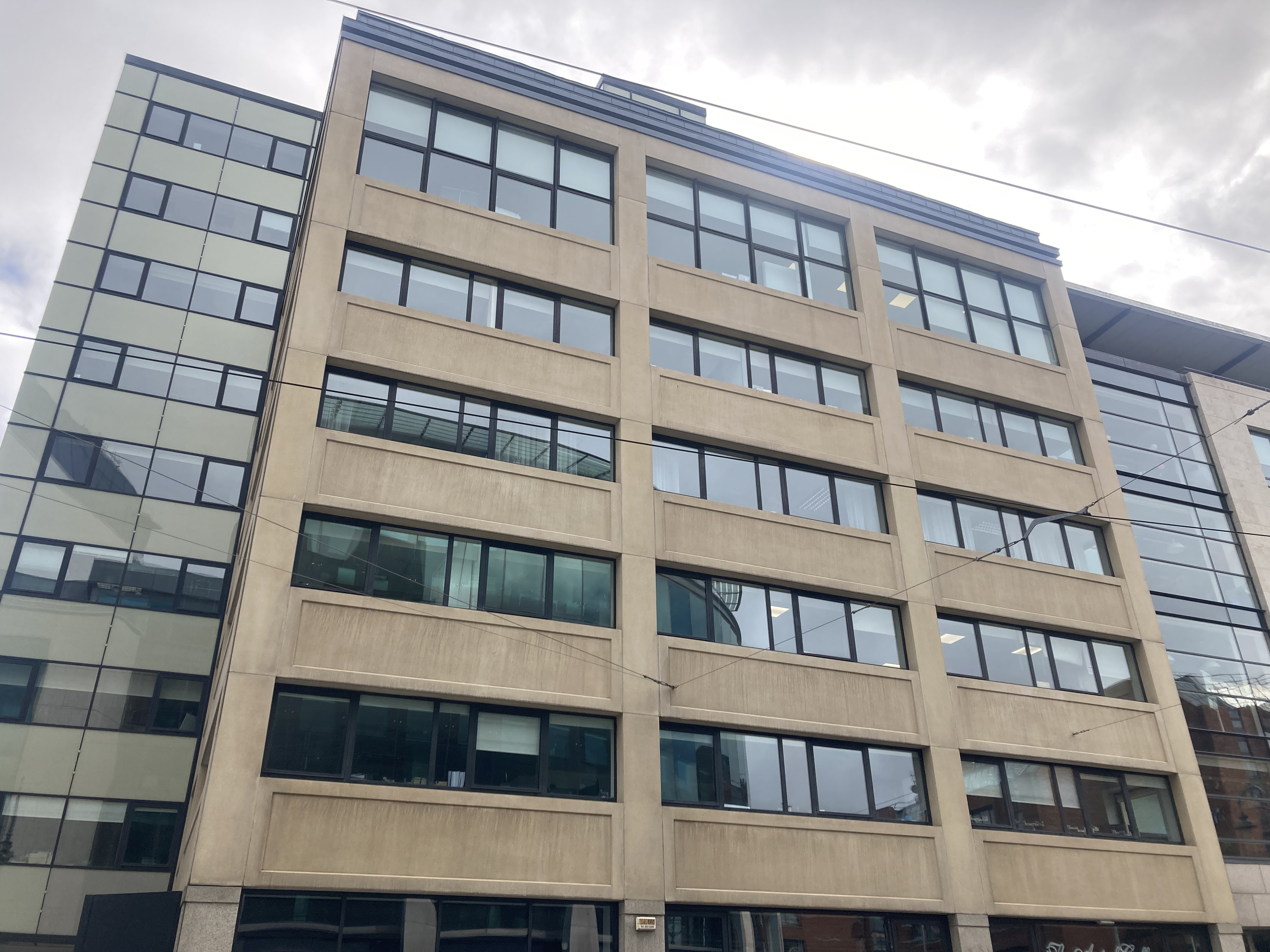
Building hosting the Embassy in Dublin

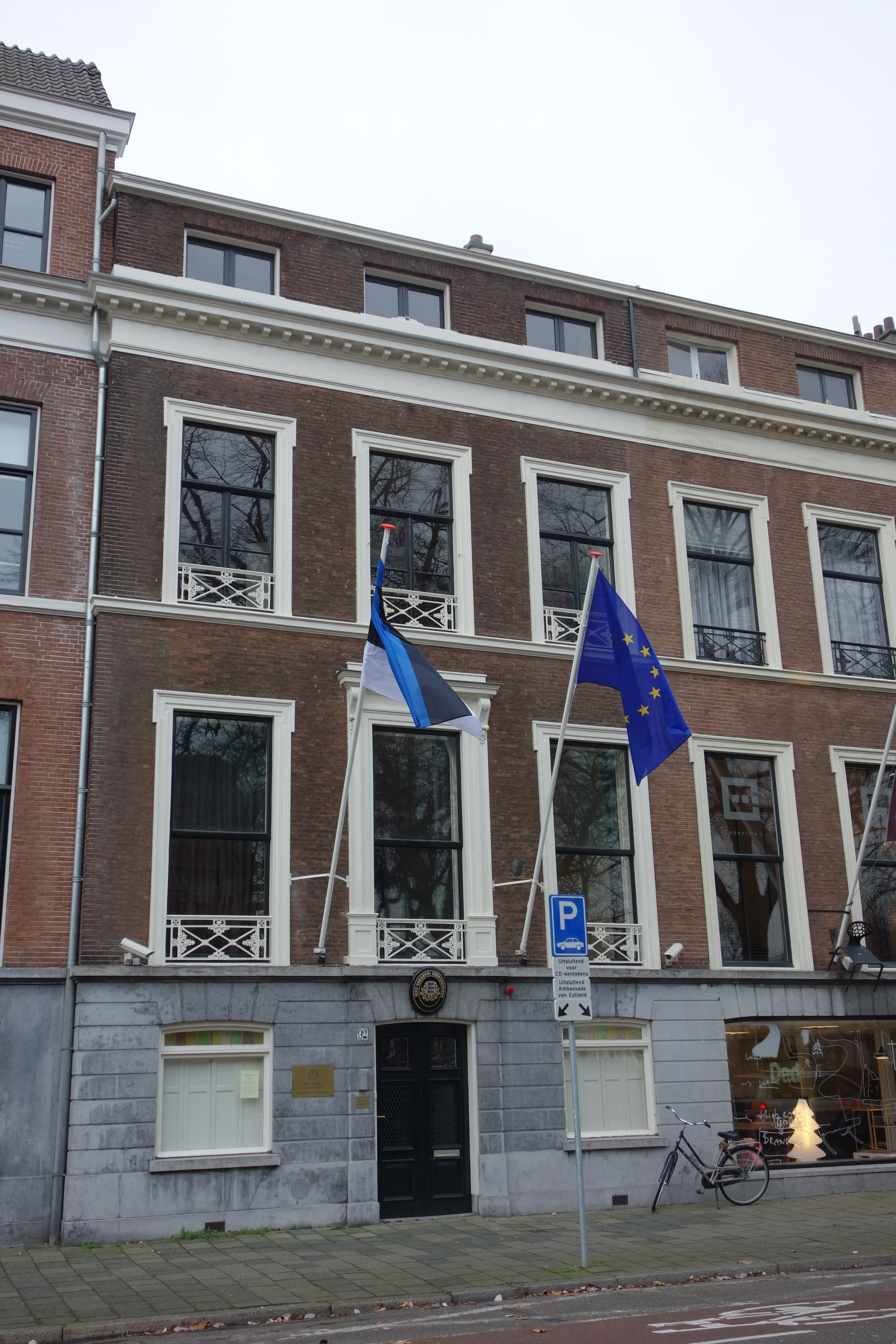
Embassy in The Hague

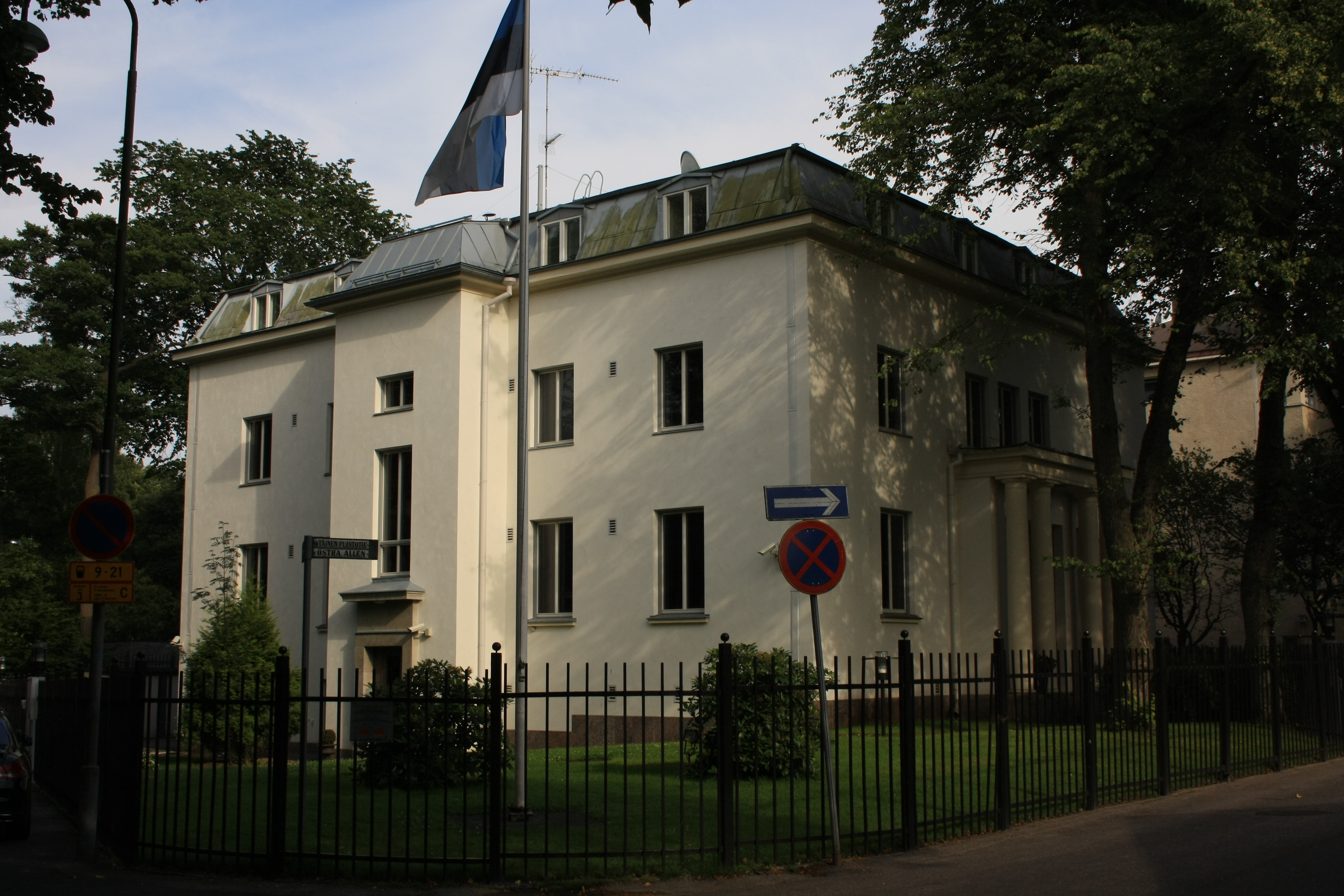
Embassy in Helsinki

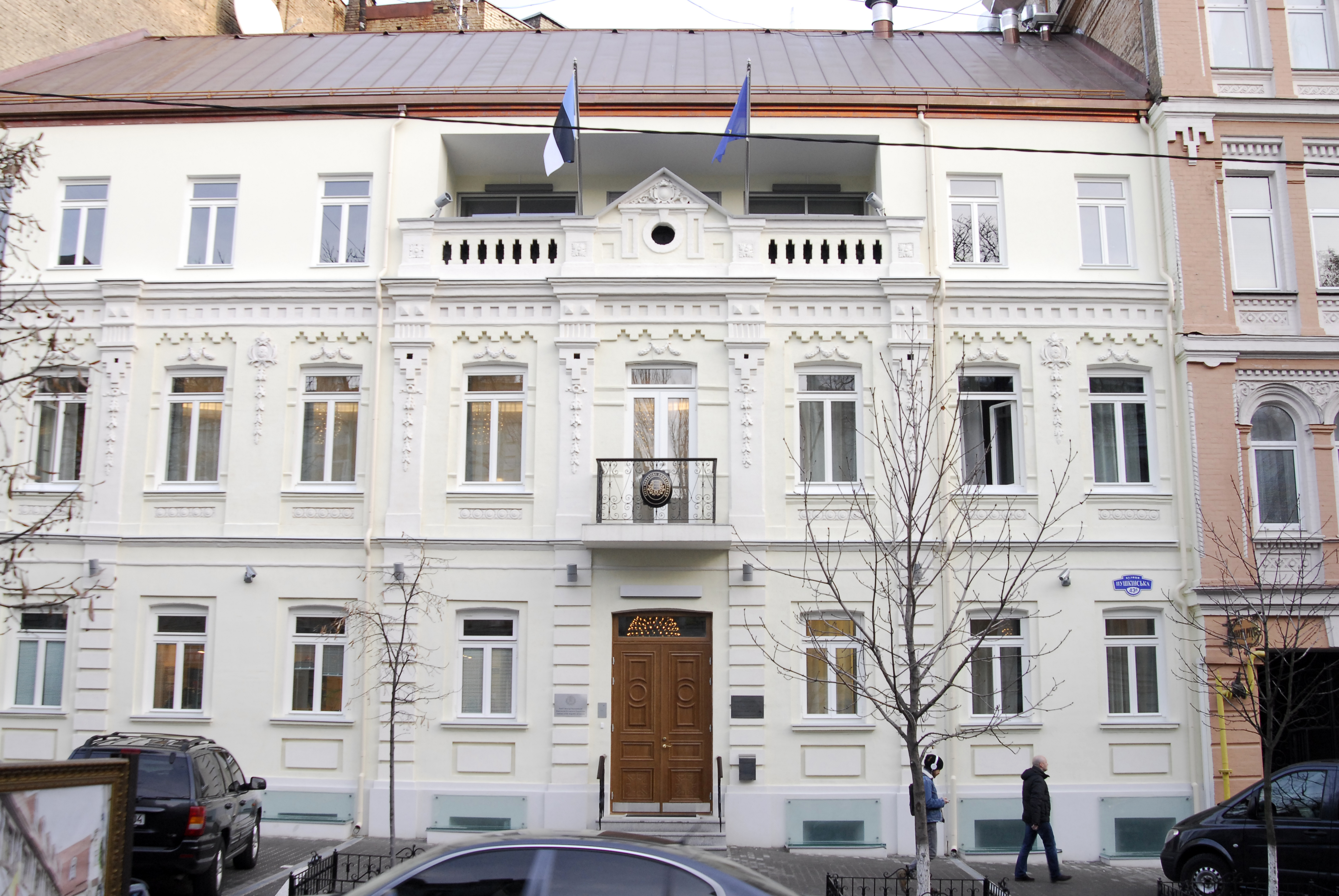
Embassy in Kyiv

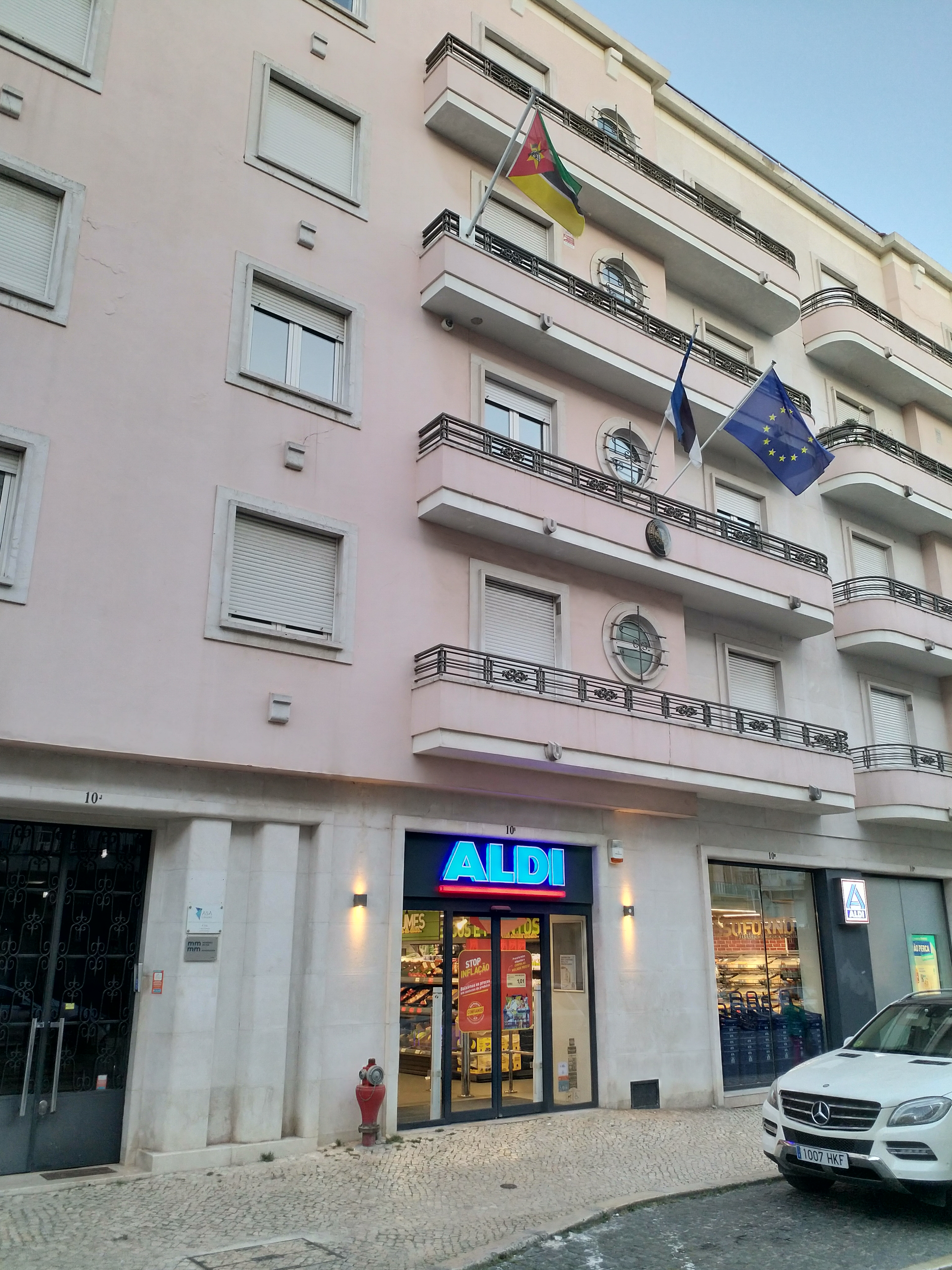
Building hosting the Embassy in Lisbon

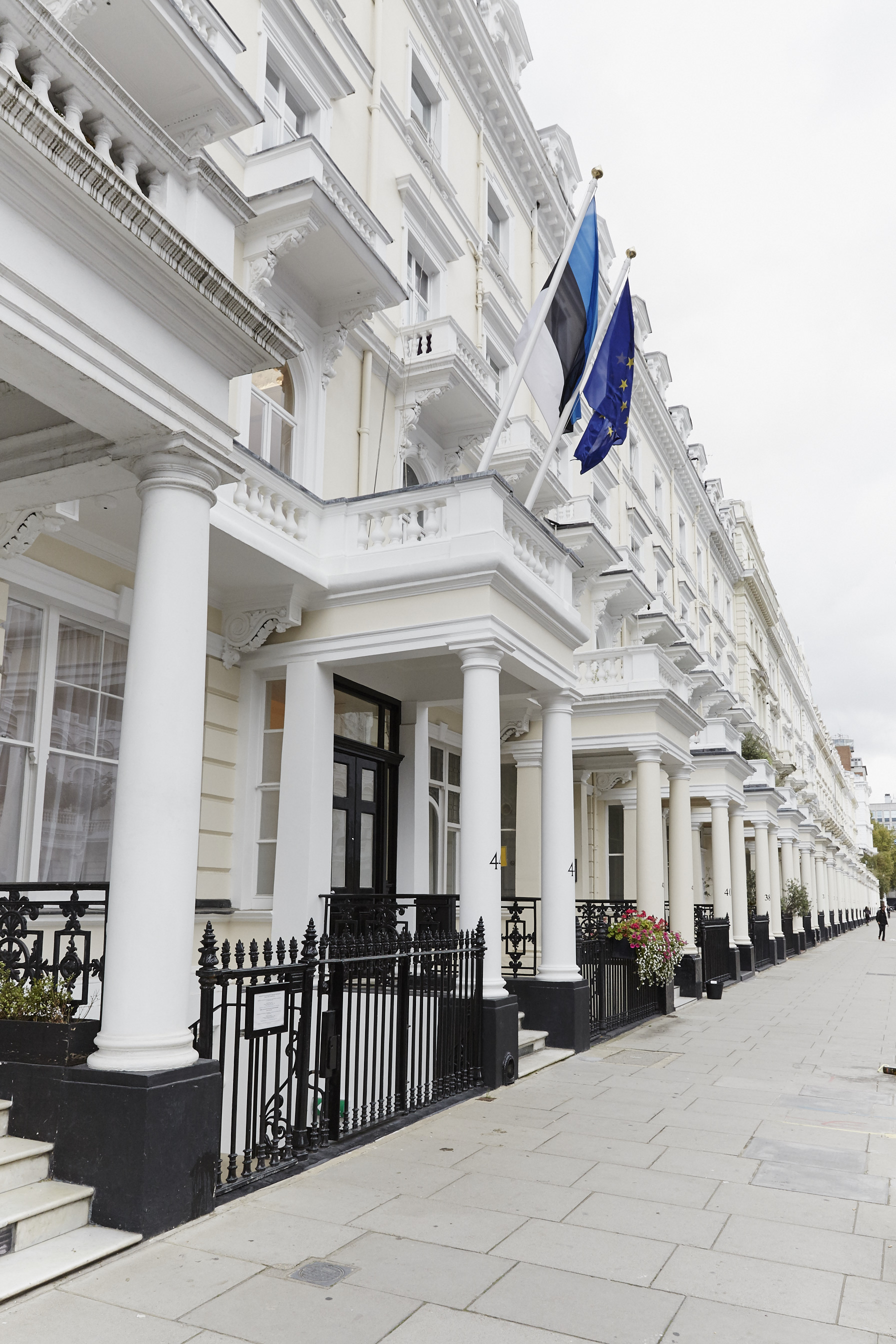
Embassy in London

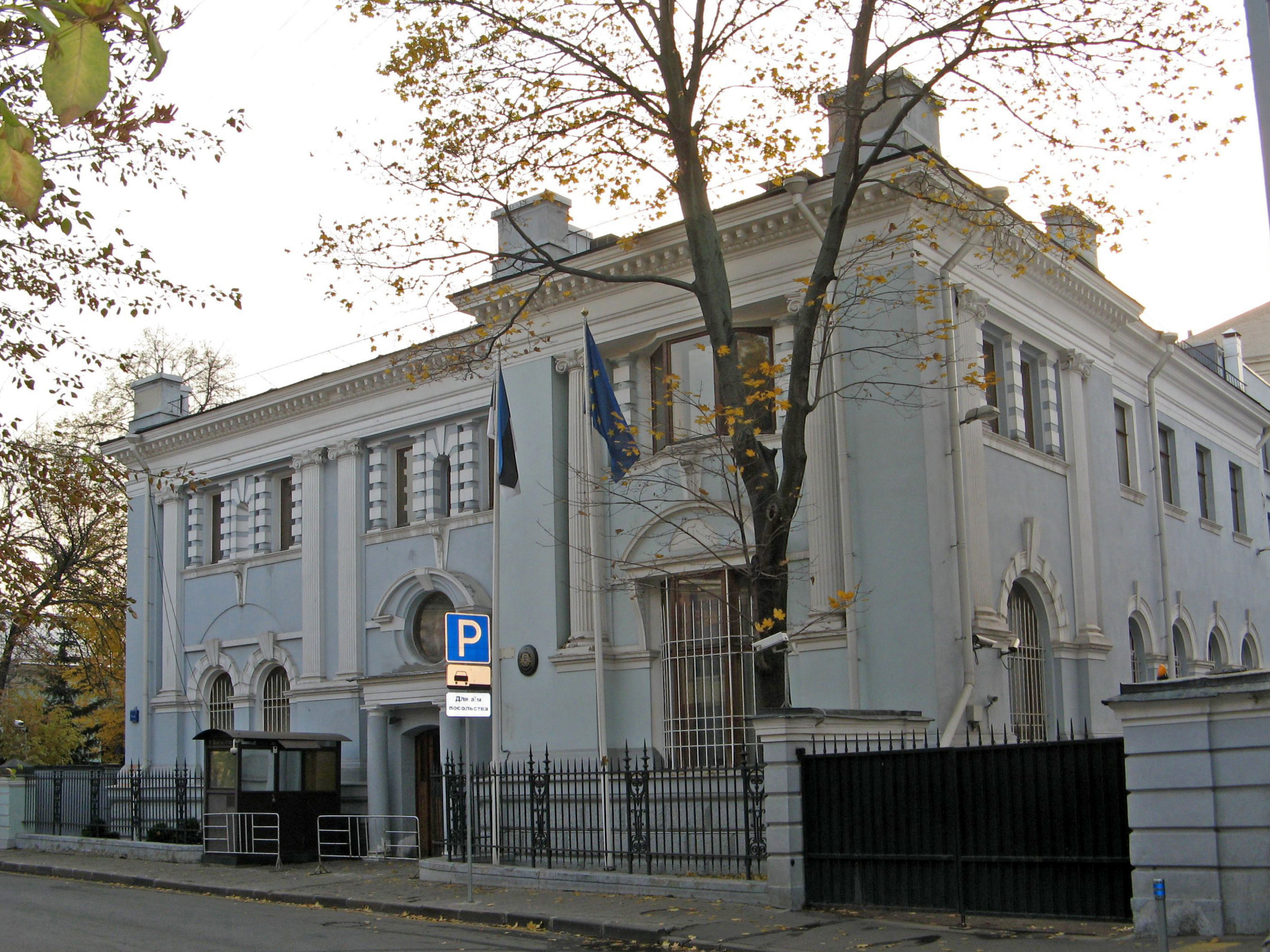
Embassy in Moscow

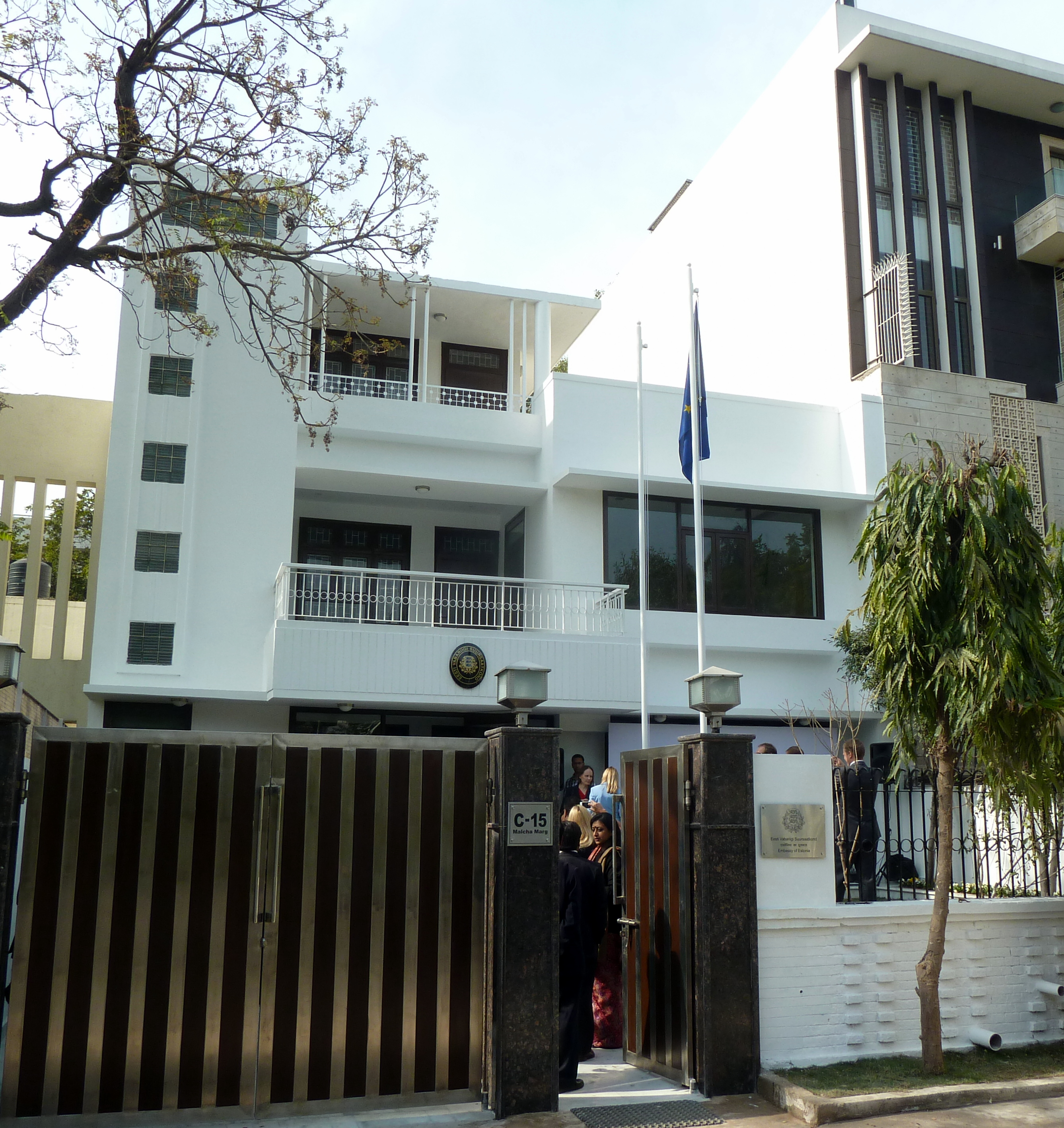
Embassy in New Delhi

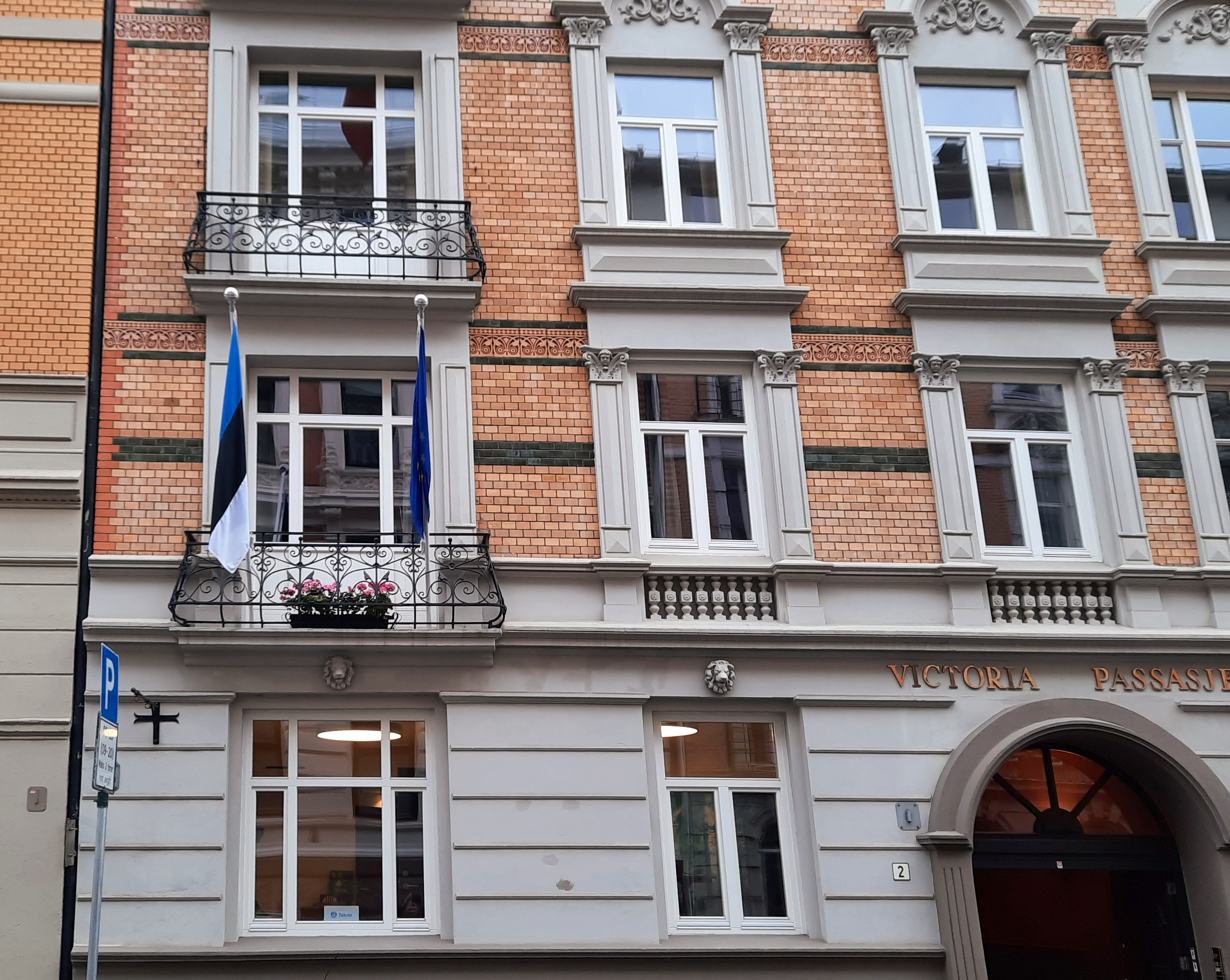
Building hosting the Embassy in Oslo

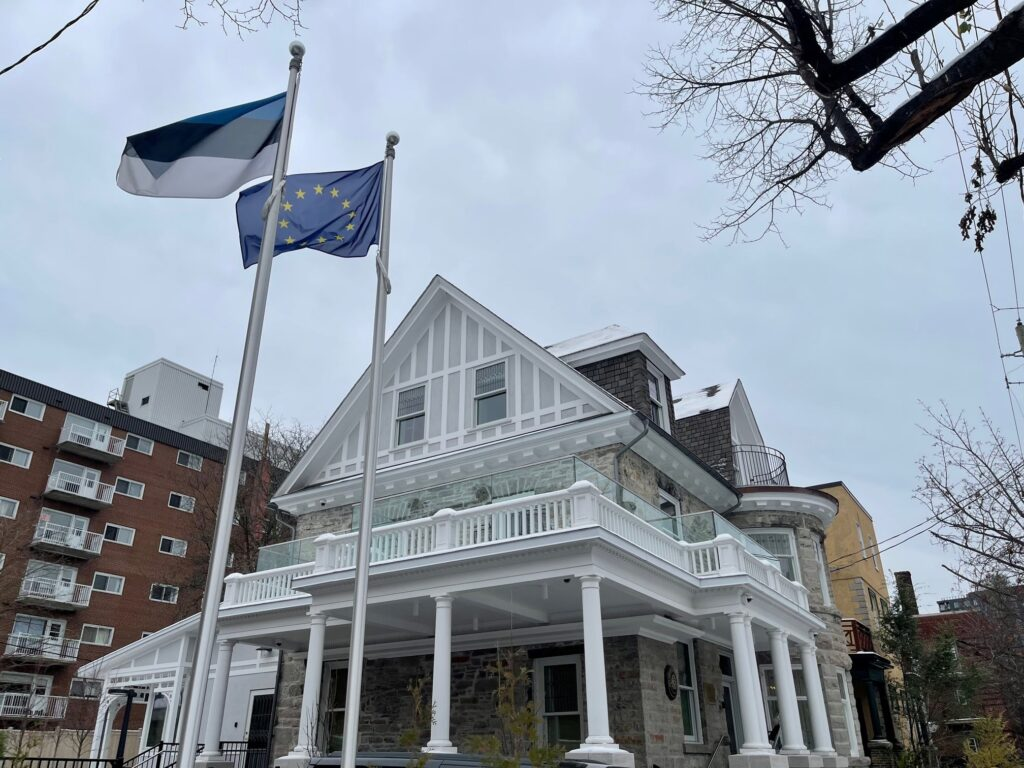
Embassy in Ottawa

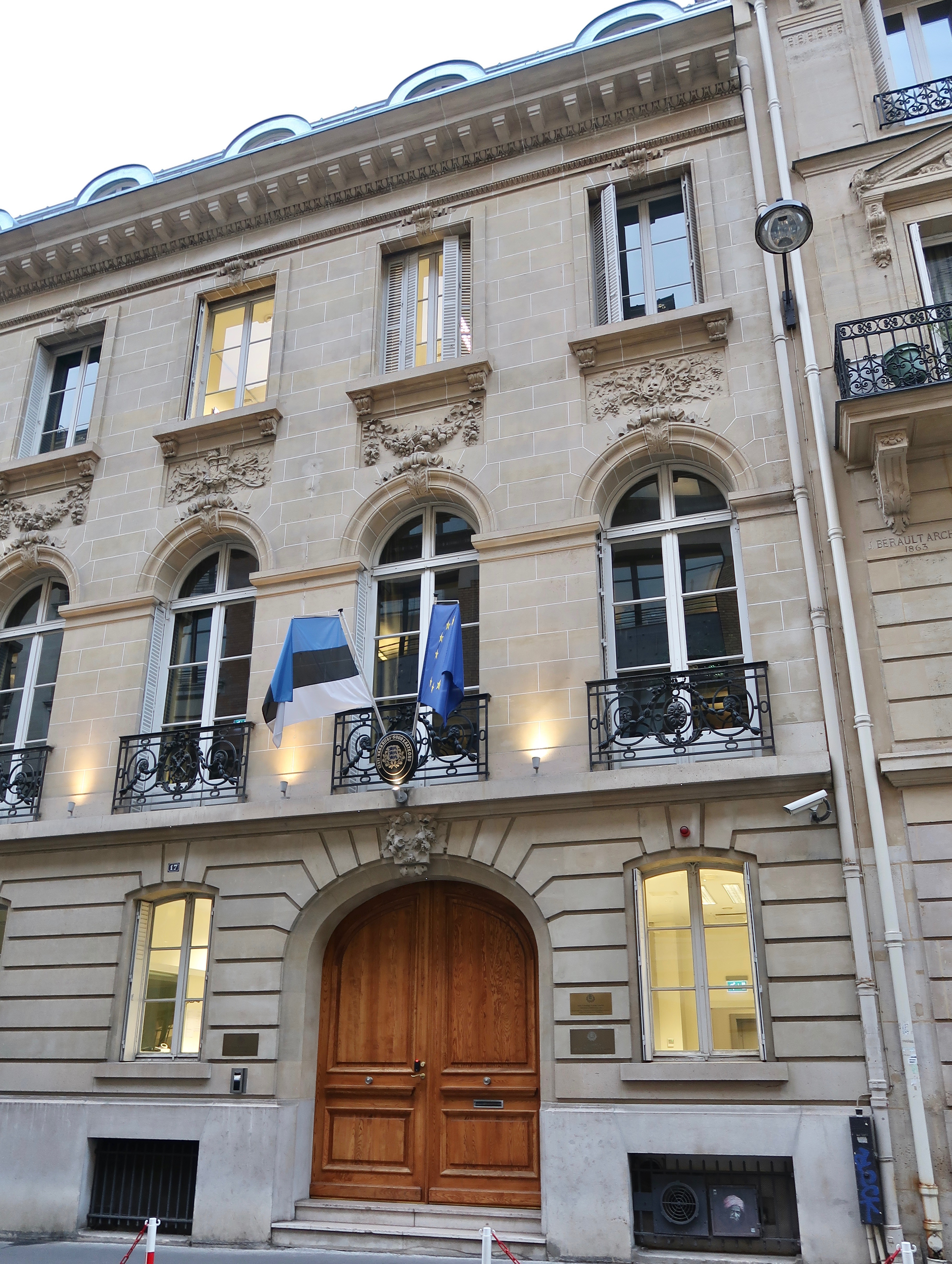
Embassy in Paris

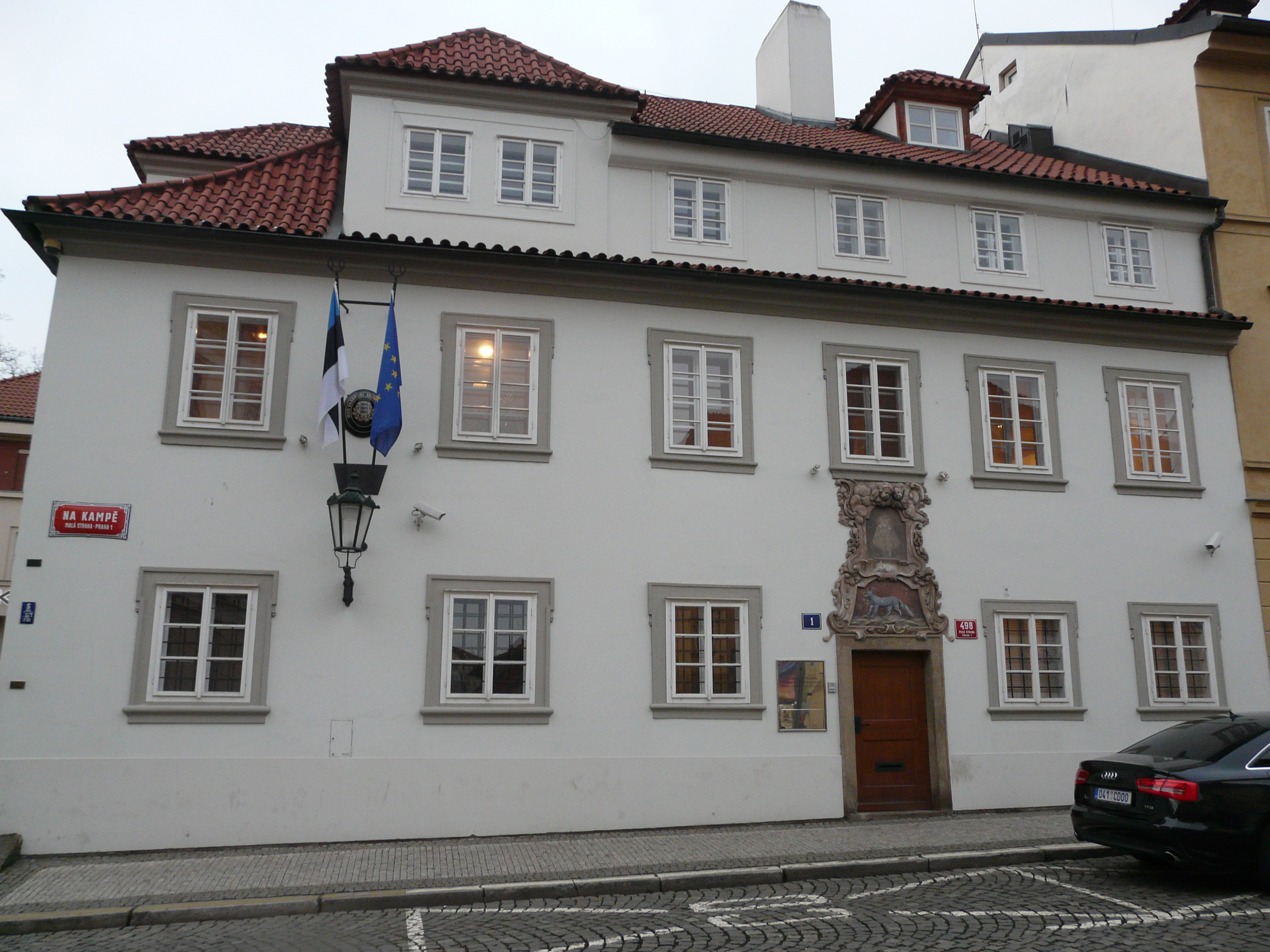
Embassy in Prague

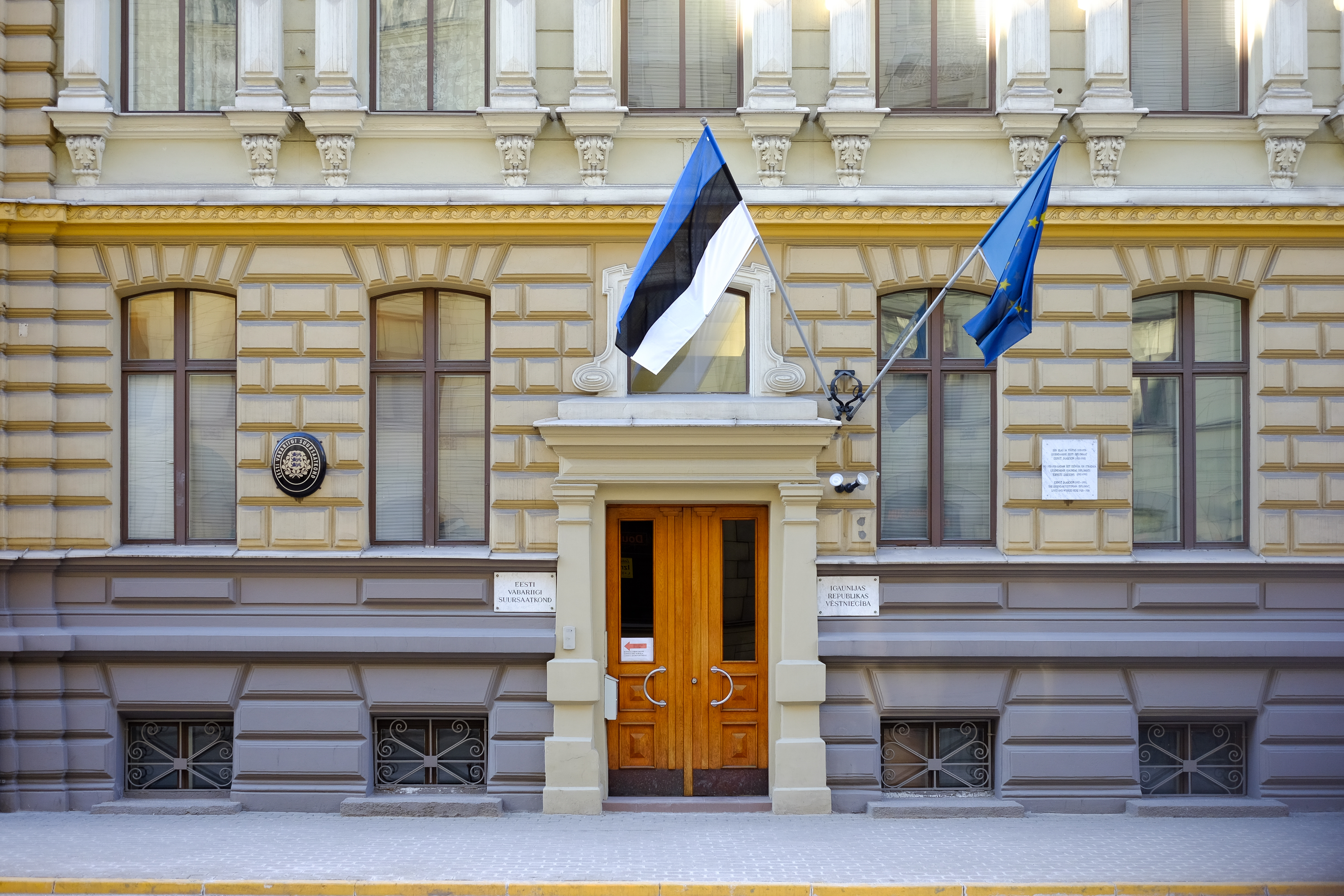
Embassy in Riga

Building hosting the Embassy in Seoul

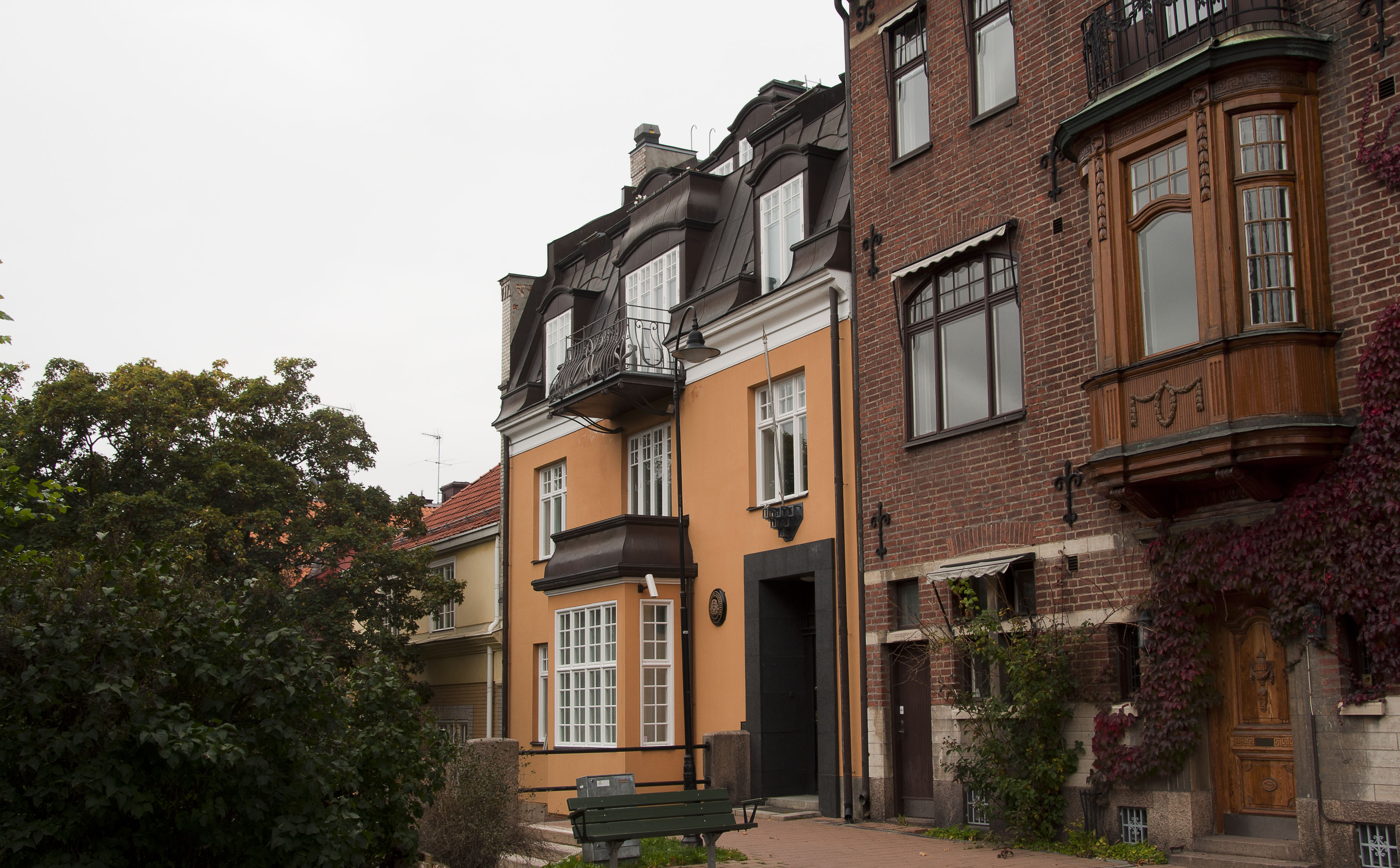
Embassy in Stockholm

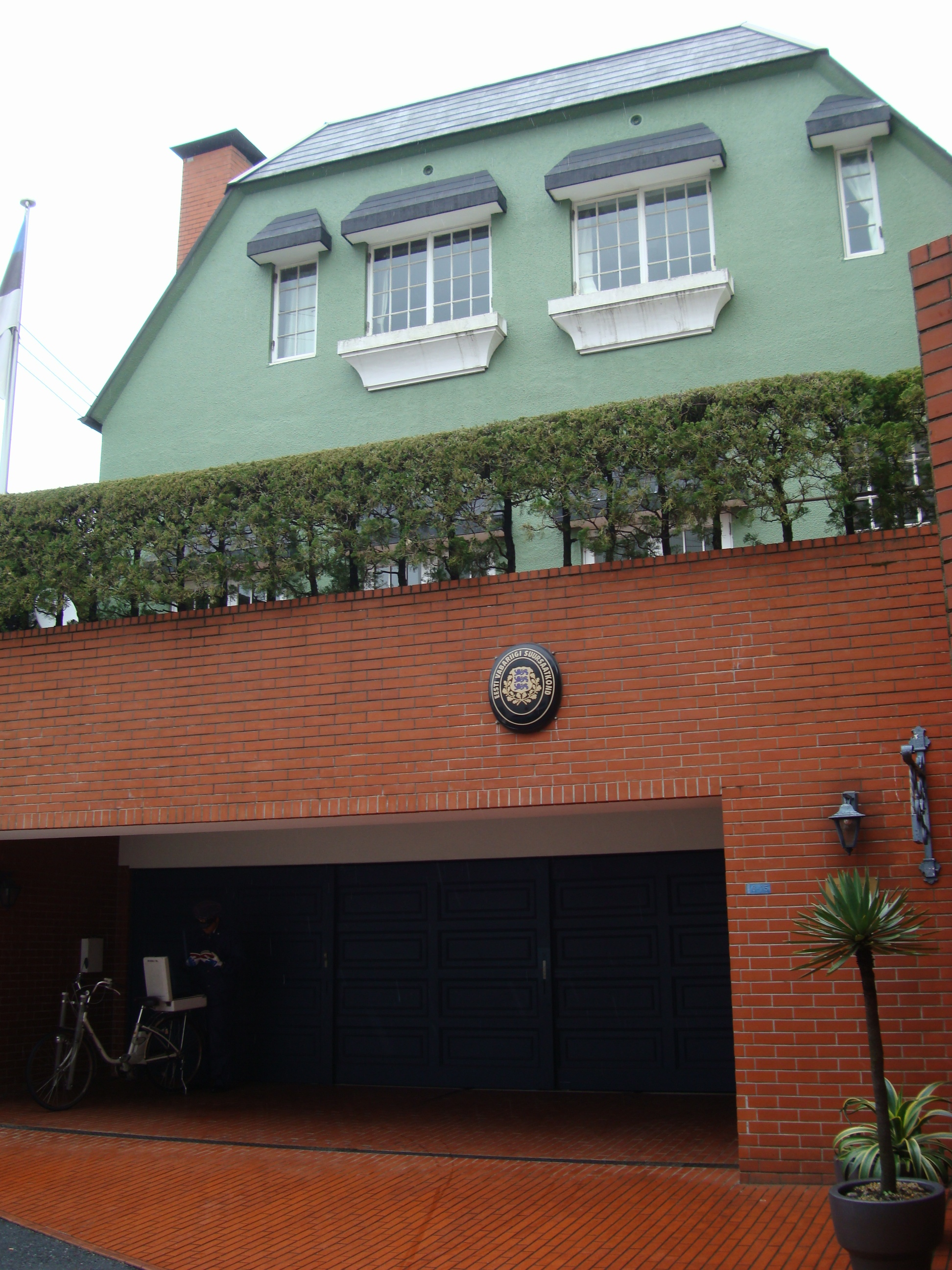
Embassy in Tokyo

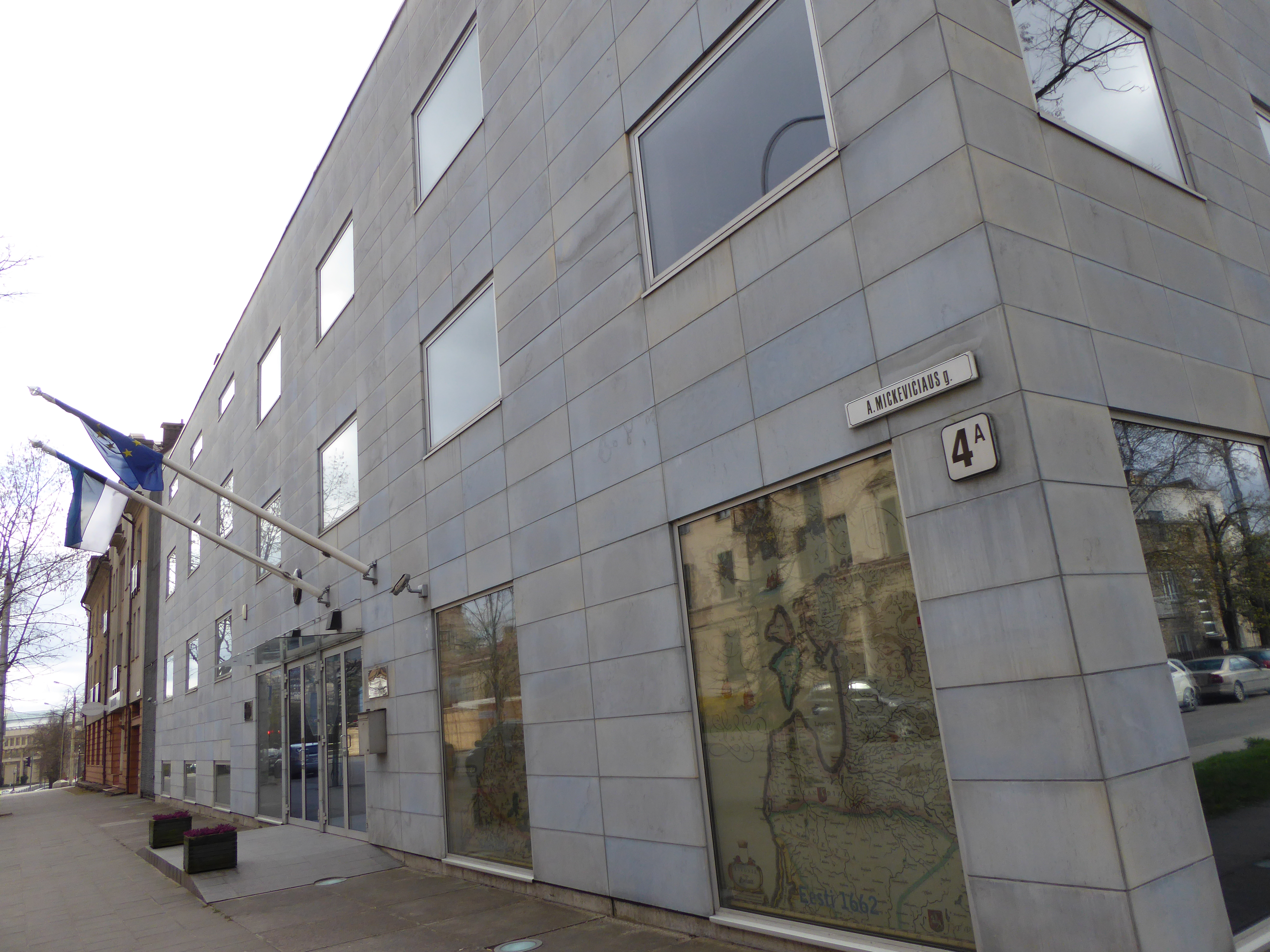
Embassy in Vilnius

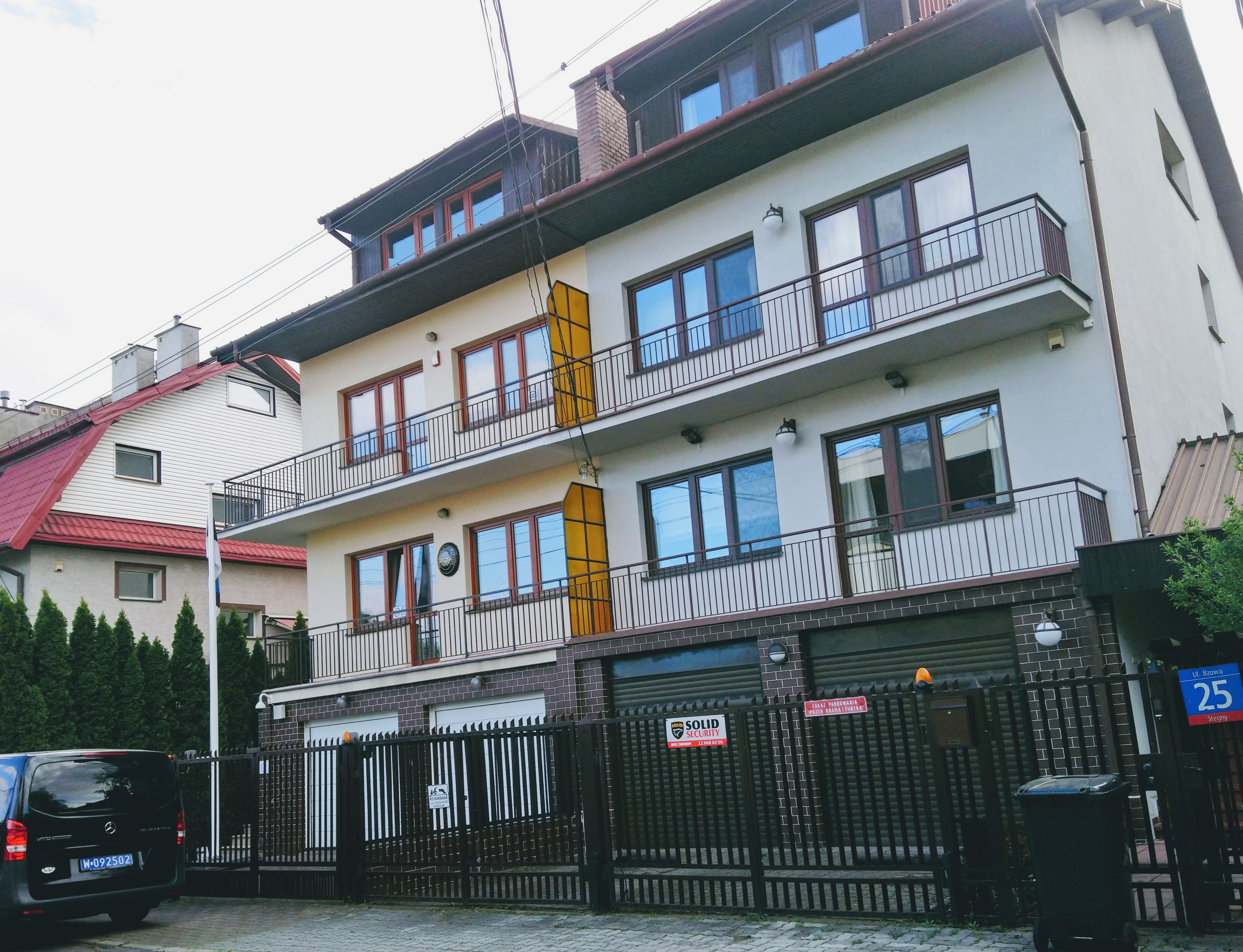
Embassy in Warsaw

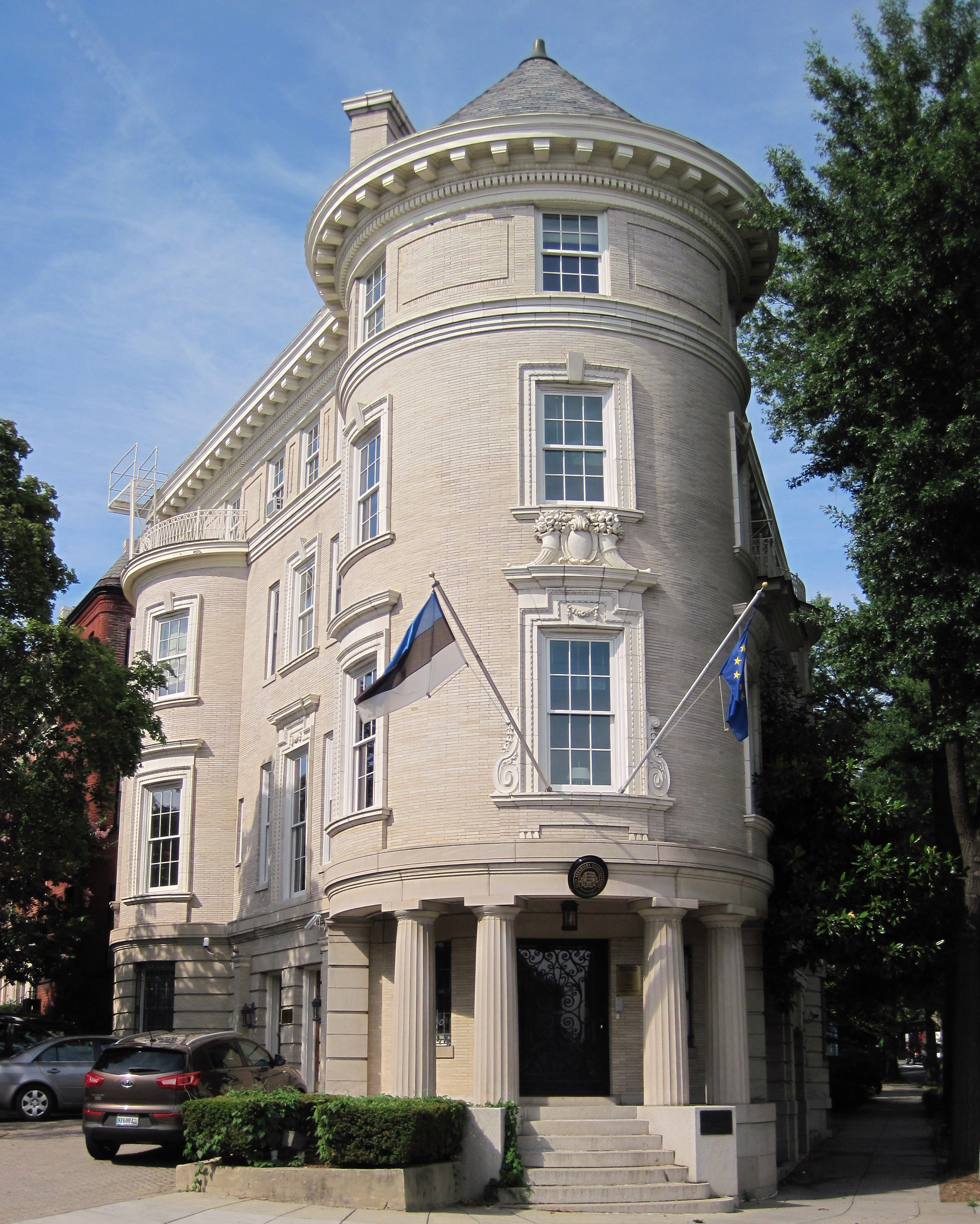
Embassy in Washington, D.C.

== Closed Missions ==
Host country	Host city	Mission	Year closed	Ref.
United States	New York City	Consulate-General	2024	
United States	San Francisco	Consulate-General	2024	
Russia	Saint Petersburg	Consulate-General	2023	
Russia	Pskov	Consular office	2023	
Bulgaria	Sofia	Embassy	2012	

== See also ==
- Foreign relations of Estonia
- List of diplomatic missions in Estonia
- Visa policy of the Schengen Area
