= List of diplomatic missions in Estonia =

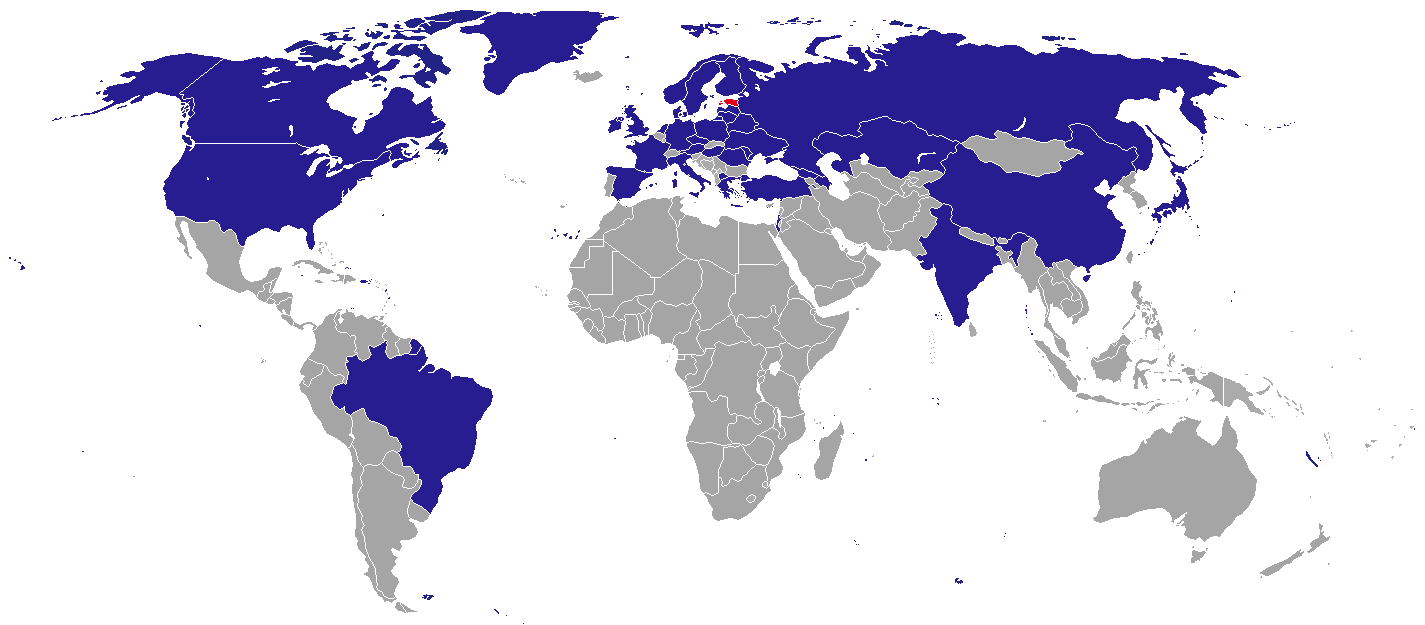
Diplomatic missions in Estonia

This article lists diplomatic missions resident in Estonia. At present, the capital city of Tallinn hosts 35 embassies. Several other countries have ambassadors accredited to Estonia, with most being resident in Nordic capitals.

== Embassies in Tallinn ==
Country	Mission type	Photo
Australia	Embassy (Pop-up)	-
Austria	Embassy	-
Azerbaijan	Embassy	-
Belarus	Embassy	-
Brazil	Embassy	-
Canada	Embassy	-
China	Embassy	-
Czech Republic	Embassy	-
Denmark	Embassy	-
Finland	Embassy	-
France	Embassy	-
Georgia	Embassy	-
Germany	Embassy	-
Greece	Embassy	-
Hungary	Embassy	-
India	Embassy	-
Ireland	Embassy	-
Israel	Embassy	-
Italy	Embassy	-
Japan	Embassy	-
Kazakhstan	Embassy	-
Latvia	Embassy	-
Lithuania	Embassy	-
Moldova	Embassy	-
Netherlands	Embassy	-
North Macedonia	Embassy	-
Norway	Embassy	-
Poland	Embassy	-
Romania	Embassy	-
Russia	Embassy	-
South Korea	Embassy	-
Spain	Embassy	-
Sweden	Embassy	-
Turkey	Embassy	-
Ukraine	Embassy	-
United Kingdom	Embassy	-
United States	Embassy	-

== Non-resident embassies accredited to Estonia ==
=== Resident in Berlin, Germany ===
1. Bahrain
2. Burkina Faso
3. Dominican Republic
4. Ecuador
5. Ghana
6. Guinea
7. Kuwait
8. Malawi
9. Mali
10. Mauritania
11. Myanmar
12. Paraguay
13. Togo

=== Resident in Copenhagen, Denmark ===
1. Bangladesh
2. Nepal
3. Uganda

=== Resident in London, United Kingdom ===
1. Antigua and Barbuda
2. Belize
3. Guyana
4. Oman

=== Resident in Helsinki, Finland ===
1. Argentina
2. Belgium
3. Bulgaria
4. Chile
5. Croatia
6. Cuba
7. Cyprus
8. Egypt
9. Iceland
10. Indonesia
11. Iran
12. Iraq
13. Malaysia
14. Mexico
15. Morocco
16. Namibia
17. Peru
18. Philippines
19. Portugal
20. Qatar
21. Saudi Arabia
22. Serbia
23. Slovakia
24. Thailand
25. Tunisia
26. Uruguay
27. United Arab Emirates
28. Vietnam

=== Resident in Minsk, Belarus ===
1. Kyrgyzstan
2. Syria
3. Tajikistan
4. Turkmenistan

=== Resident in Riga, Latvia ===
1. Slovenia
2. Switzerland
3. Taiwan (Mission)
4. Uzbekistan

=== Resident in Stockholm, Sweden ===
1. Australia
2. Bolivia
3. Bosnia and Herzegovina
4. Botswana
5. El Salvador
6. Guatemala
7. Kenya
8. Kosovo
9. Laos
10. Mongolia
11. South Africa
12. Sri Lanka
13. Sudan
14. Tanzania
15. Zambia
16. Zimbabwe

=== Resident in Warsaw, Poland ===
1. Afghanistan
2. Albania
3. Algeria
4. Angola
5. Colombia
6. Lebanon
7. Montenegro
8. New Zealand
9. Pakistan
10. Panama

=== Resident in Vilnius, Lithuania ===
1. Armenia
2. Holy See
3. Nigeria

=== Resident elsewhere ===
1. Andorra (Andorra la Vella)
2. Cambodia (Sofia)
3. Eswatini (Brussels)
4. Honduras (Brussels)
5. Jordan (The Hague)
6. Luxembourg (Prague)
7. Malta (Valletta)
8. Rwanda (The Hague)
9. San Marino (City of San Marino)
10. Suriname (Paramaribo)
11. Venezuela (Oslo)

== Closed missions ==
=== Embassies in Tallinn ===
- Bulgaria (closed in 2011) (Note: Resident in Helsinki, Uusimaa, Finland)
- Belgium
- Portugal

=== Consulates in Tallinn ===
- Sweden (closed in 1938)

=== Consulates in Narva ===
- Russia (closed in 2022)

=== Consular offices in Tartu ===
- Russia (closed in 2022)

== See also ==
- Foreign relations of Estonia
- List of diplomatic missions of Estonia
- Visa requirements for Estonian citizens
