= Estonian House =

Estonian culture centre outside Estonia

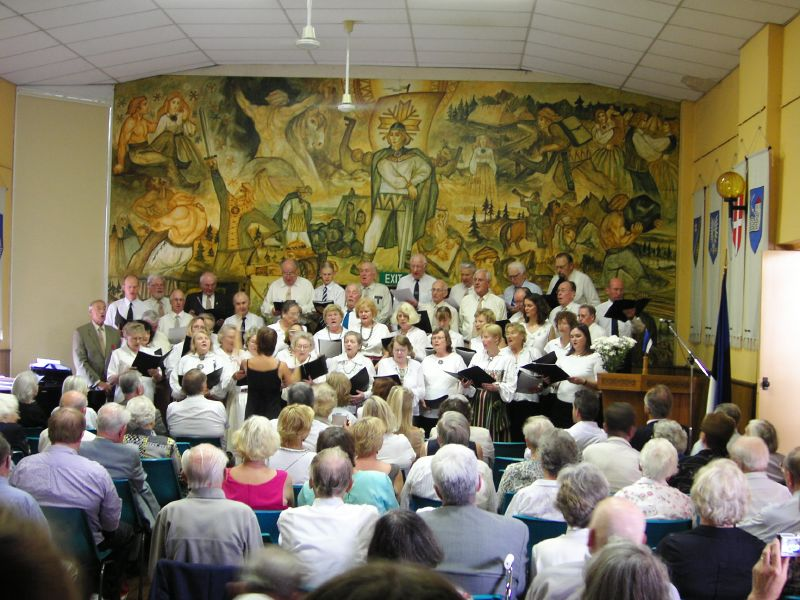
Celebration of Estonian Independence Day at the Sydney Estonian House

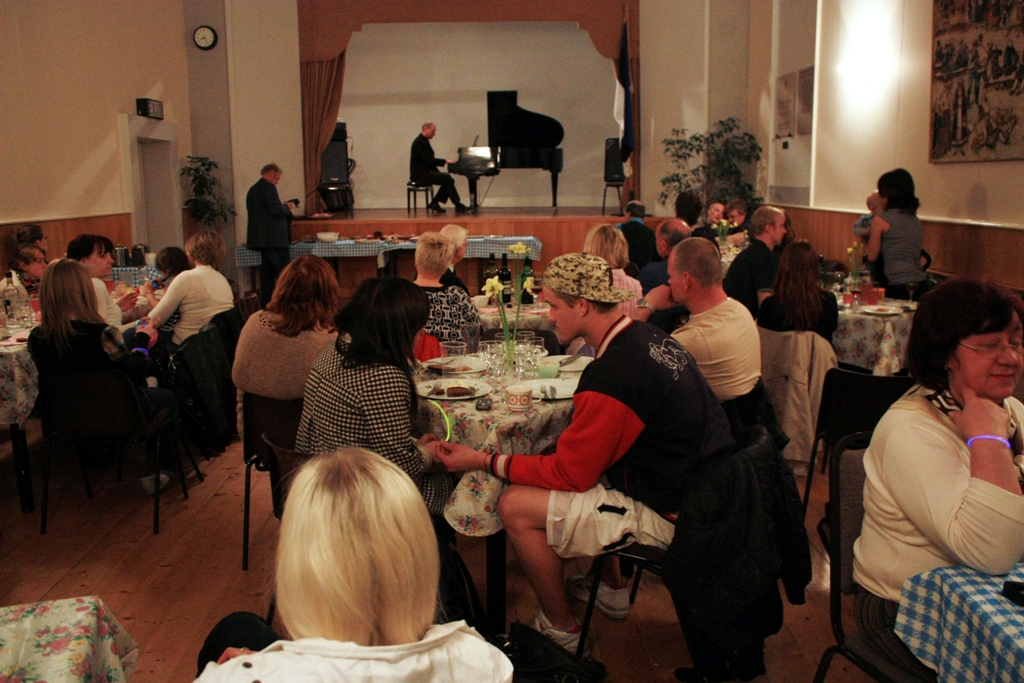
Mart Sander performing at the London Estonian House

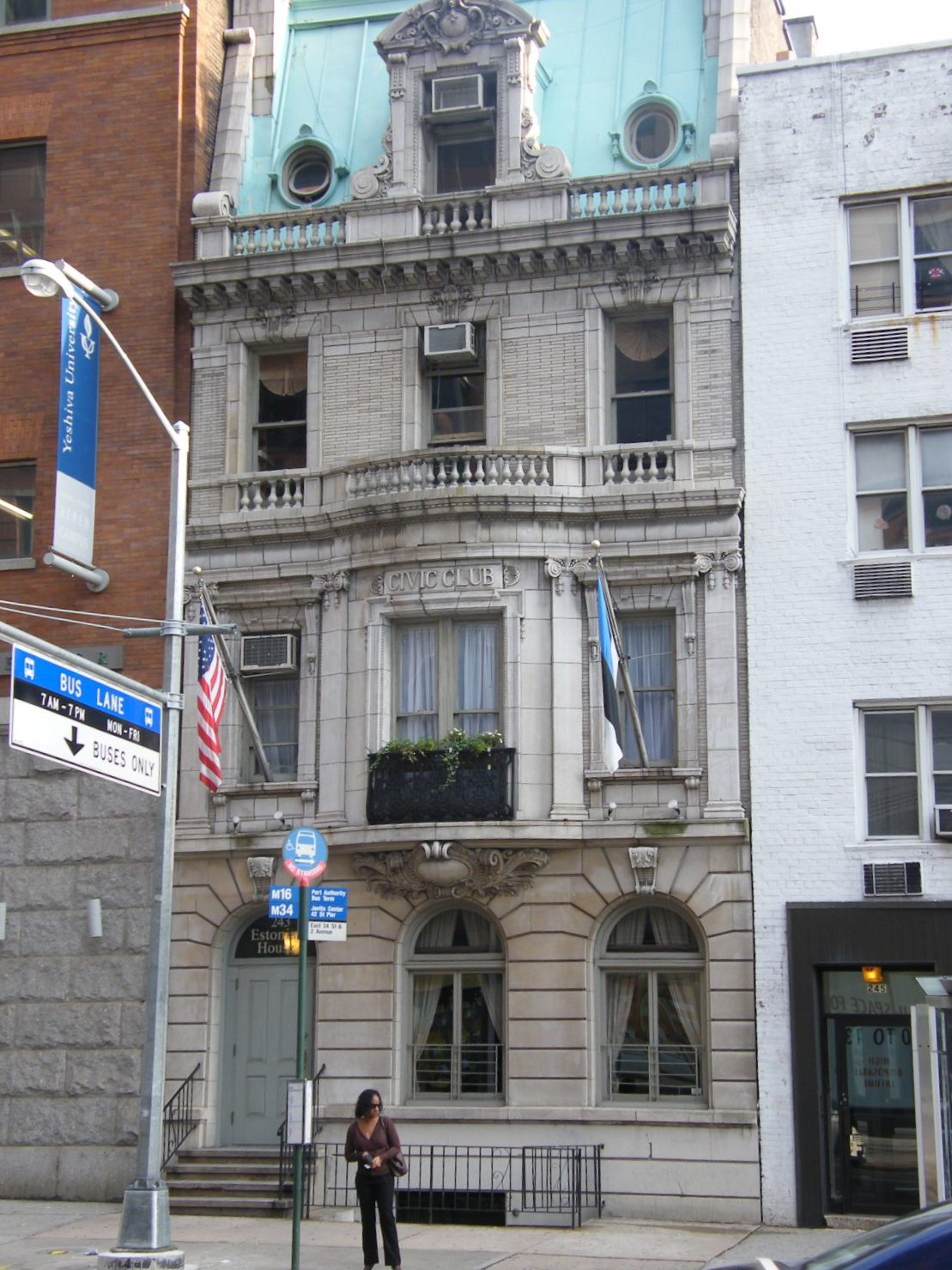
New York Estonian House

An Estonian House (Estonian: Eesti Maja) is a center of Estonian culture, usually overseas. Numerous Estonian Houses were set up after the Soviet occupation of Estonia led to tens of thousands of Estonian people fleeing the war and the occupation and settling overseas.

== London ==
On 30 May 2009, the London Estonian House opened Estonian School in London, a volunteer-supported Estonian language school teaching based on Estonian curricula employing fully qualified teachers with teaching experience from Estonian comprehensive and high schools.

== New York ==
New York Estonian House was bought in 1946 by Estonian-Americans. It is located at 243 East 34th Street in the Kips Bay neighborhood on Manhattan. It houses a number of Estonian organizations such as the New York Estonian School, the editorial office of Estonian language newspaper Vaba Eesti Sõna, choruses for men and women and a folk dancing group.

== Toronto ==
The Toronto Estonian House was purchased on April 1, 1960. The house is located at 958 Broadview Avenue, in what was the Chester Public School house, built in 1891. Two additions were built, the first in 1963, when a 400-seat hall was built at the rear of the building, and the second in 1976, when a four-storey facade was constructed. It houses a number of Estonian organizations such as the Toronto Estonian School, the Toronto Estonian scout troop Kalev, the Põhjala Tütred Guides, the Estonian Toronto Credit Union, Heinsoo Insurance, the Estonian Central Council in Canada, choruses for men and women and a folk dancing group, and the Estonian Consulate in Toronto.

== Sydney ==
Sydney Estonian House was the first house built by Estonians outside of Estonia. The Estonian Society of Sydney held its first Annual General Meeting under its own roof on 14 September 1940. Sydney Eesti Maja houses many cultural groups such as Lõke and Kooskõlas Choir, Virmalised, Rebased and Rukkiklilled Folk Dancing Groups, Mudilasring children's playgroup, Kunsti-käsitöö ja Etnograafiaring and formerly Meie Kodu, the Australian-Estonian newsletter. The house holds many events throughout the year and is one of several located in Australia, others located in Adelaide, Melbourne and Thirlmere 'vanadekodu' (NSW)

The Estonian society “Eesti Kodu” [Estonian Home] was established on 17 April 1925, at the instigation of Mr Jakob Lukats. Two years later, some members of “Eesti Kodu”, wanting greater emphasis on cultural activities, decided to form a parallel society, “Linda”, which was established on 19 June 1927. Less than three months passed, before the two societies decided to merge, forming the Estonian Society of Sydney (Sydney Eesti Selts “Eesti Kodu Linda”) on 9 October 1927.
