= Estonia–United States relations =

Bilateral relations of Estonia and United States

- Estonia: United States

Diplomatic mission
- Embassy of Estonia, Washington, D.C.: Embassy of the United States, Tallinn

The relations between Estonia and the United States have been constant and strong since Estonia regained its independence in 1991. The United States and Estonia are allies and partners.

Both nations are members of the OECD, NATO and the United Nations.

== History ==
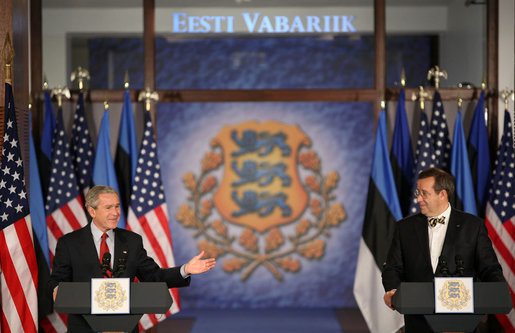
US President George W. Bush with Estonian President Toomas Hendrik Ilves in 2006.

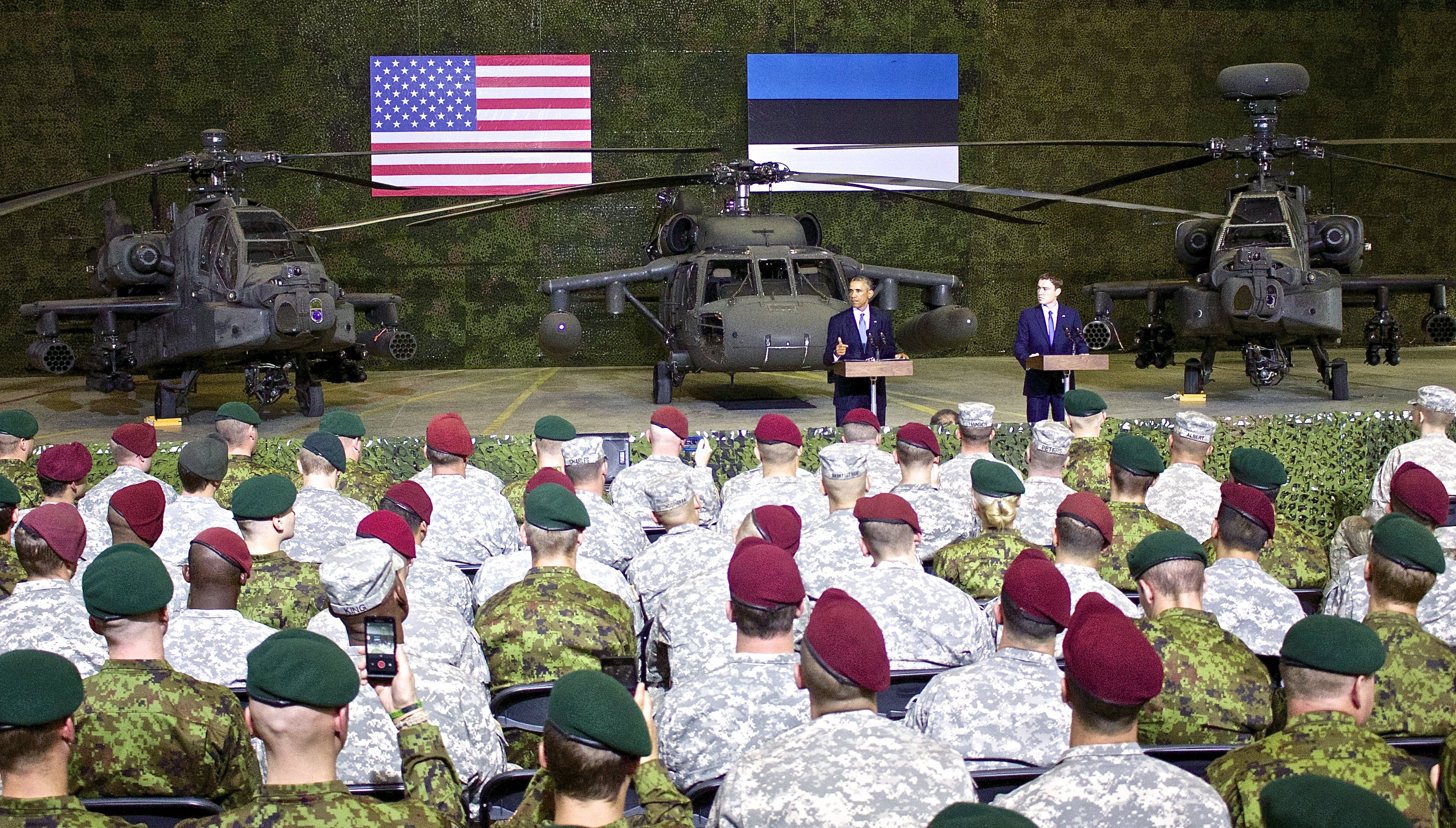
President Barack Obama and Prime Minister Taavi Rõivas in the Ämari Air Base, Estonia, 2014

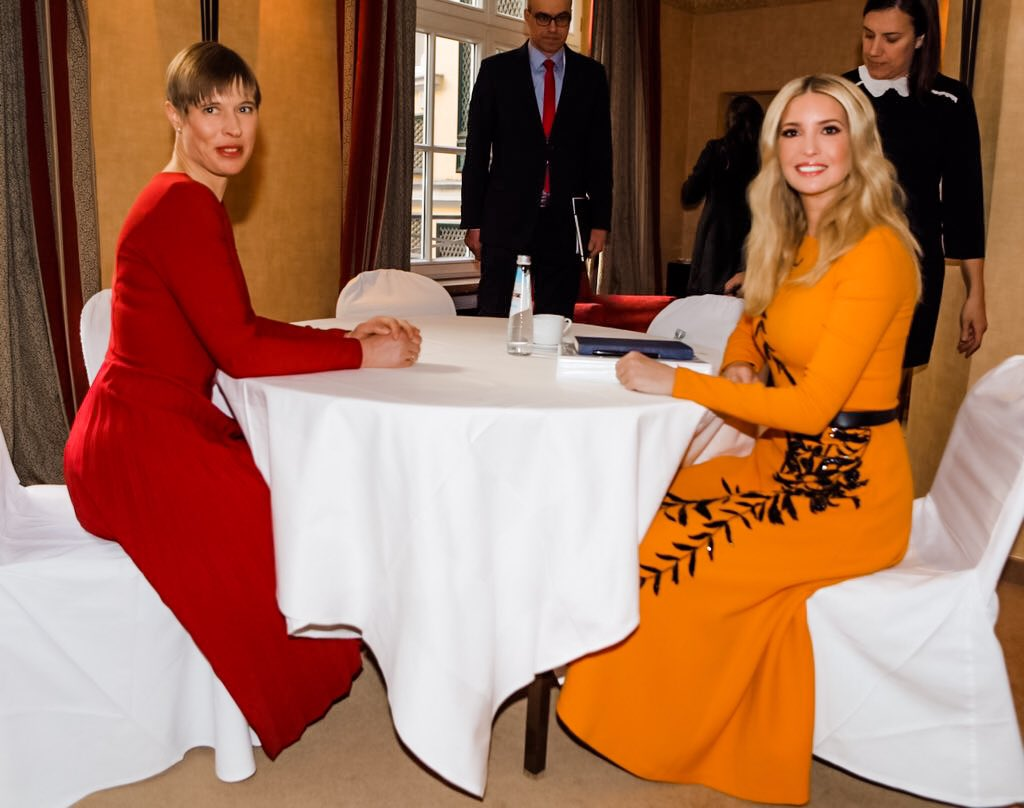
Ivanka Trump met with Estonian President Kersti Kaljulaid, 2019

The United States recognized the Republic of Estonia de jure on July 28, 1922. The first Estonian diplomatic mission in the United States was opened in the same year when the U.S. Commissioner at Riga, Evan Young, was declared the American representative to the three Baltic States, at the rank of Minister. An embassy in Tallinn was opened on June 30, 1930, with Harry E. Carlson as Chargé d'affaires. Following the Soviet occupation in August 1940 the American Embassy was closed in September 1940. However, the US government never recognized the legitimacy of the Soviet Rule in Estonia (1940 to 1991), and continued recognizing Estonia's diplomatic mission in the US as the legal representative of the Republic of Estonia. The recognition of the legal continuity of the Republic of Estonia has been the cornerstone of Estonian-U.S. relations.

On September 2, 1991, US President George H. W. Bush recognized the restoration of Estonia's independence. The U.S. reopened its embassy in Tallinn on September 4, 1991. Relations between the two countries have since developed rapidly. In November 2006, President George W. Bush became the first sitting U.S. president to visit Estonia. During the visit, he announced the administration's intention to work with the U.S. Congress to make changes to the U.S. Visa Waiver Program, increasing security while facilitating entry for legitimate visitors and businesspeople from countries like Estonia.

President Barack Obama nominated Jeffrey D. Levine as ambassador to Estonia, and he was confirmed by the Senate on March 29, 2012. Ambassador Levine presented his credentials to Estonian President Toomas Hendrik Ilves on September 17, 2012. Mrs. Marina Kaljurand, in September 2011 replaced Mr. Väino Reinart who had been serving as Estonia's ambassador to the United States since September 2007. Estonia also is represented in the United States by a consulate general in New York, Sten Schwede; and 10 honorary consuls: Jaak Treiman in Los Angeles, Eric Harkna and Siim Soot in Chicago, Paul Aarne Raidna in Seattle, Larry Ruth in Lincoln, Harry Huge in Charleston, Michael Corey Chan in San Diego, Aadu Allpere in Atlanta, and Steve Chucri in Phoenix.

=== Principal U.S. officials in Estonia ===
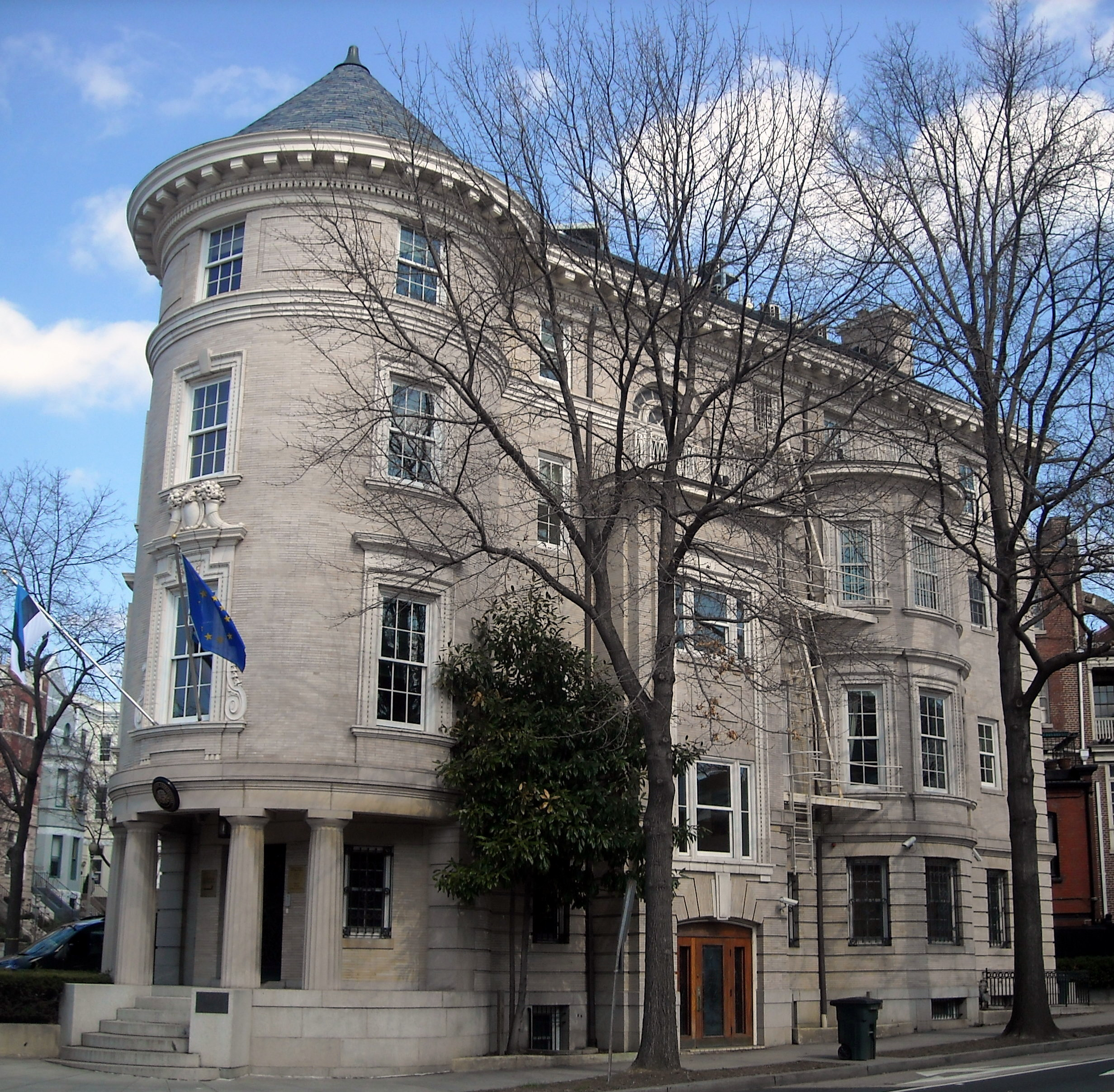
Embassy of Estonia in Washington, D.C.

- Ambassador – Roman Pipko
- Deputy Chief of Middion – Matthew E. Wall

=== Principal Estonian officials in US – embassy ===
- Ambassador – H.E. Mr. Jonatan Vseviov
- Deputy Chief of Mission – Sven Jurgenson
- Consul General – Mrs. Kairi Kunka

=== Resident diplomatic missions ===
- Estonia has an embassy in Washington, D.C.
- United States has an embassy in Tallinn.

== See also ==
- Estonian Americans
- Foreign relations of the United States
- Foreign relations of Estonia
- New York Estonian House
- List of ambassadors of Estonia to the United States
