= Civic Club / Estonian House =

Clubhouse in Manhattan, New York, U.S.

- Civic Club (New York Estonian House)
- U.S. National Register of Historic Places
- New York State Register of Historic Places
- New York City Landmark
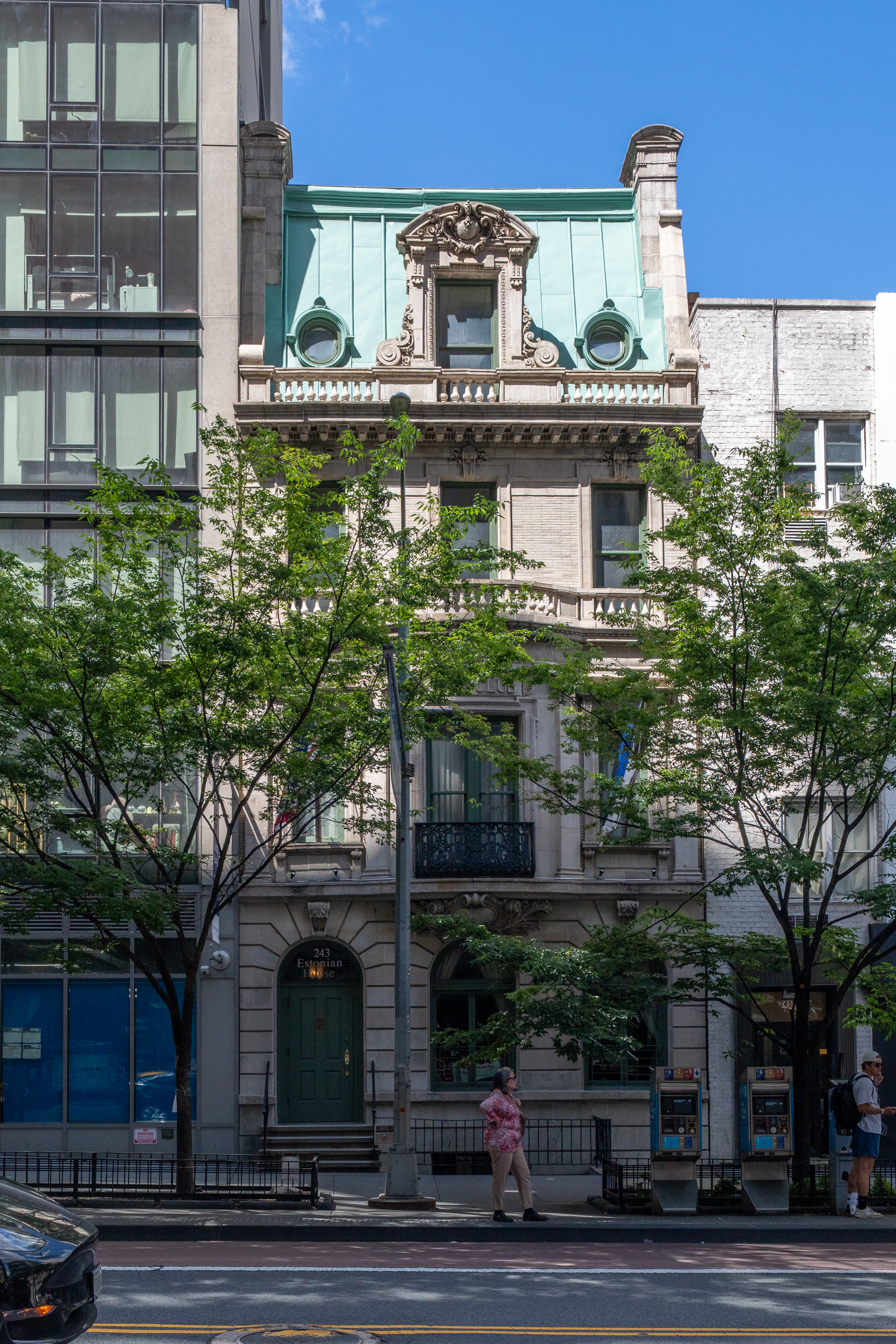
- (2026)
- Location: 243 East 34th Street; Manhattan, New York City
- Coordinates: 40°44′42.5″N 73°58′34.4″W
- Built: 1898–1899
- Architect: Thomas A. Gray
- Architectural style: Beaux-Arts
- NRHP reference No.: 82003372
- NYSRHP No.: 06101.001684
- NYCL No.: 0980

Significant dates
- Added to NRHP: September 16, 1982
- Designated NYSRHP: August 5, 1982
- Designated NYCL: March 28, 1978

The Civic Club building, now the New York Estonian House (Estonian: New Yorgi Eesti Maja), is a four-story Beaux-Arts building located at 243 East 34th Street between Second and Third Avenues in the Murray Hill neighborhood of Manhattan in New York City.

The house was originally built for the Civic Club in 1898–1899, having been designed by Brooklyn architect Thomas A. Gray. The Civic Club was founded by the local social reformer F. Norton Goddard (1861–1905) to reduce poverty and fight against gambling in the neighborhood. After Goddard's death in 1905, the club ceased to exist, but the building remained in the Goddard family until 1946, when Frederick Norton's widow sold it for $25,000 to the New York Estonian Educational Society, Inc., which still owns the house today. The building underwent a $100,000 restoration in 1992.

Known as the Estonian House (Eesti Maja), the building hosts several Estonian organizations, including the New York Estonian School (New Yorgi Eesti Kool), the Foundation for Estonian Arts and Letters (Eesti Kultuurifond Ameerika Ühendriikides), men's and women's choruses, and a folk dancing group. Vaba Eesti Sõna, the largest Estonian-language newspaper in the United States, is also published at the New York Estonian House. The Estonian House has become the main center of Estonian culture on the U.S. Eastern seaboard, especially amongst Estonian-Americans.

The building was designated as a landmark by the New York City Landmarks Preservation Commission in 1978 and was added to the National Register of Historic Places in 1982.

== See also ==
- List of Estonian Americans
- Estonia–United States relations
- Estonian House
- Estonian Consulate General in New York
- List of New York City Designated Landmarks in Manhattan from 14th to 59th Streets
- National Register of Historic Places listings in Manhattan from 14th to 59th Streets
