= Consulate General of Estonia, New York =

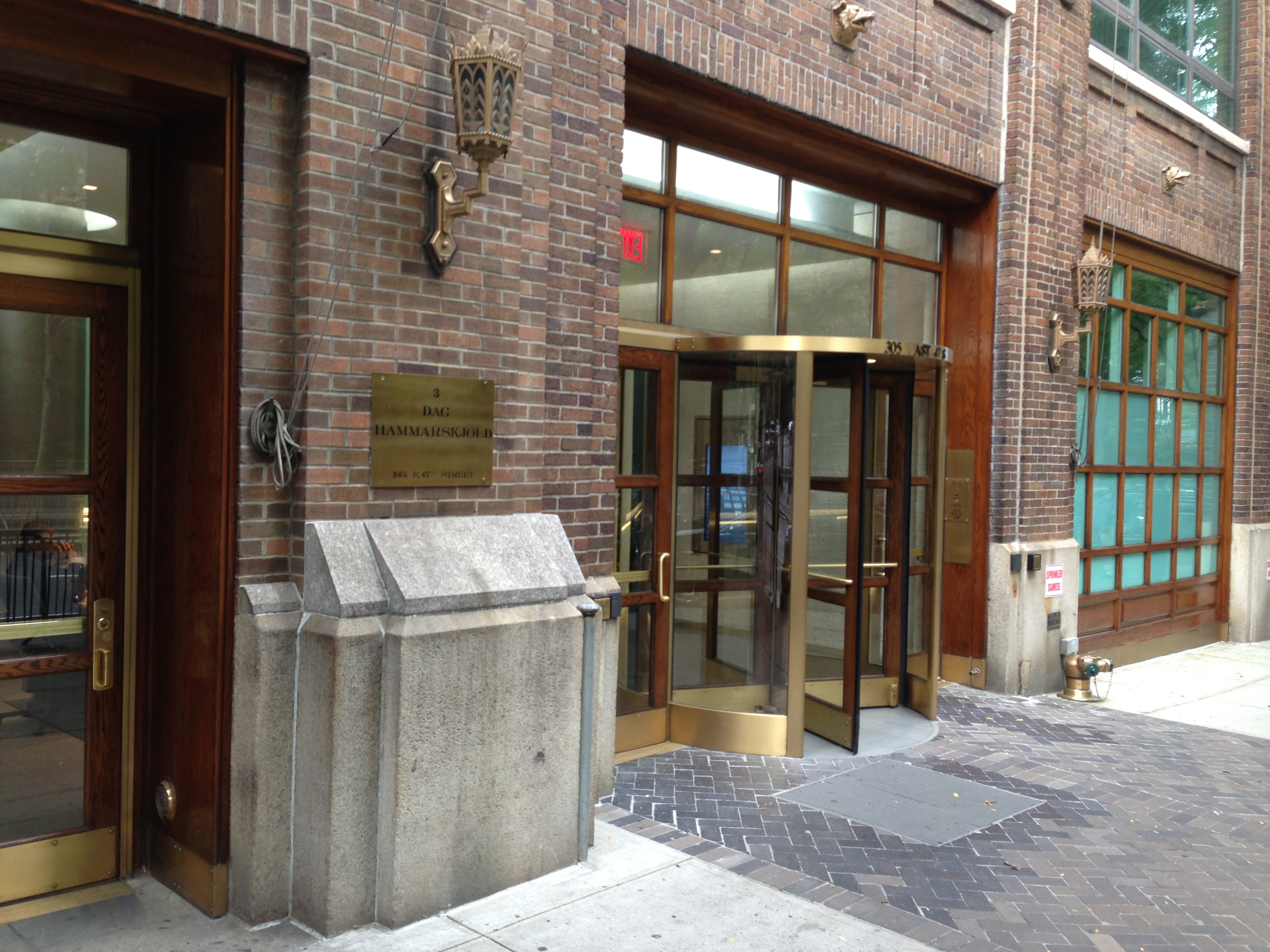
3 Dag Hammarskjöld building entrance

The Consulate General of Estonia in New York was a diplomatic mission representing the Republic of Estonia to the city of New York, United States of America. The consulate was located at 3 Dag Hammarskjöld Plaza.

The consulate was permanently closed in August 2024 due to financial difficulties.

== History ==
After the outbreak of the Second World War and the Soviet occupation of 1940, many Estonian diplomats working in embassies remained abroad, and several Foreign Ministry staff managed to flee Estonia during the war.

Following the June coup in Estonia, the diplomatic representations of the Republic of Estonia continued to operate in the United States. Thanks to the activities of these foreign missions, the Foreign Ministry was the only public institution that continued to exist between 1940 and 1991, therefore preserving the continuity of Estonian statehood.

In 1940, the Foreign Ministry planned to reopen its embassy in Washington, D.C., but this never came to pass as Estonia came under foreign occupation. The Consulate General in New York, on the other hand, remained active until the restoration of Estonia's independence in 1991. It was home to Johannes Kaiv, the Consul General carrying out the duties of an ambassador until his death in 1965. Ernst Jaakson continued his work until 1991, when Jaakson was named ambassador of the restored Republic of Estonia to the United States and permanent representative to the United Nations.

In September 2023, Minister of Foreign Affairs, Margus Tsahkna, announced that due to financial difficulties, Estonia would be closing its consulate generals in New York and San Francisco. Thereafter all consular services would be provided from the Estonian Embassy in Washington, D.C.

== See also ==
- Embassy of Estonia, Washington, D.C.
- Embassy of the United States, Tallinn
- New York Estonian House
