= Embassy of Estonia, Washington, D.C. =

Diplomatic mission of Estonia to USA

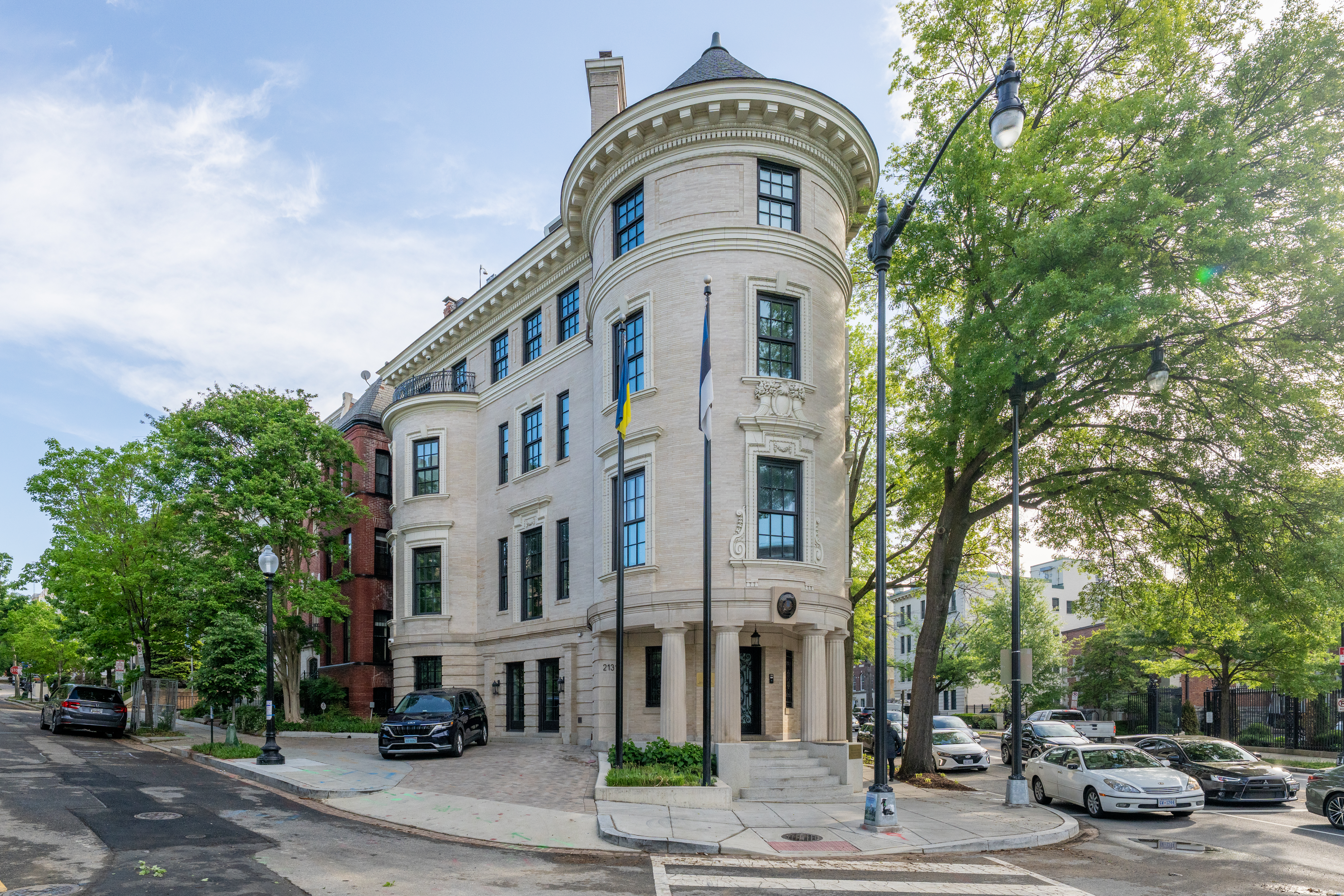
- Location: Washington, D.C.
- Address: 2131 Massachusetts Avenue, N.W.
- Coordinates: 38°54′42.9″N 77°2′54.8″W
- Ambassador: Kristjan Prikk
- Website: Official website

Estonian Embassy (Estonian: Eesti Suursaatkond Washingtonis) is the Republic of Estonia's diplomatic mission to the United States. It is located at 2131 Massachusetts Avenue, in Northwest, Washington, D.C., at the intersection with 22nd Street in the Embassy Row neighborhood.

The Republic of Estonia, along with Latvia and Lithuania, maintained a diplomatic mission throughout the years of Soviet domination; the Estonian Consulate General was based in New York City at 9 Rockefeller Plaza. With Estonia's independence in 1991, the legation quickly sought a new home, and in 1994 purchased the expansive rowhouse, which takes advantage of one of Washington's many angled intersections with an entrance through its corner turret, behind a Greek Doric screen.

== Building ==
The building was originally built in 1905 for a wealthy doctor, George W. Barrie, to designs by the partnership of William J. Marsh and Walter G. Peter. It was later home to the Peruvian Embassy and for many years housed the Landon School. One of the more striking buildings on Embassy Row, its purchase was a major coup for the country.

On July 2, 2001 it was severely damaged by a fire caused by faulty wiring. The building was completely refurbished and reopened in 2003.

In 2020, the reconstruction of the embassy began and the building was closed for diplomatic work. The renovation took three years and the embassy building was reopened in November 2023.

== See also ==
- Estonian Consulate General in New York
- Embassy of the United States, Tallinn
