= Vaba Eesti Sõna =

Estonian diaspora newspaper

- Type: Weekly newspaper
- Owner: Nordic Press
- Founded: January 18, 1949; 76 years ago
- Language: English, Estonian
- Headquarters: Estonian House
- City: New York City
- Country: United States
- ISSN: 8755-5808
- Website: www.vabaeestisona.com

Vaba Eesti Sõna (Estonian for Free Estonian Word) is an Estonian expatriate weekly newspaper published in New York City, United States established in 1949.

The Nordic Press was founded on 18 January 1949 by August Waldman, August Salony, Mihkel Allik and Boris Rea to publish the newspaper.

The editorial office of Vaba Eesti Sõna is located in New York Estonian House (243 East 34th Street).

== See also ==
- Harald Raudsepp, a long-time editor
