= Embassy of the United States, Tallinn =

Diplomatic mission of USA to Estonia

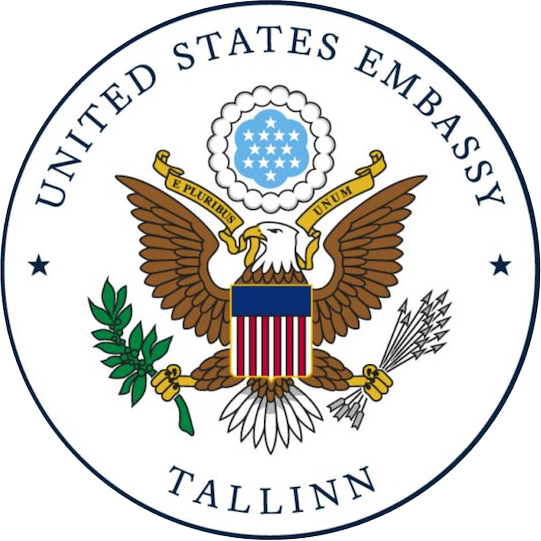
- Location: Tallinn, Estonia
- Address: 20 Kentmanni Street, 15099 Tallinn, Estonia
- Coordinates: 59.4305°N 24.7516°E
- Ambassador: Roman Pipko
- Website: Official website

The Embassy of the United States in Tallinn, Estonia, is located at the chancery building on Kentmanni Street. This building housed the U.S. legation to Estonia from April 1, 1930 until September 5, 1940. The U.S. Mission to Estonia resumed operations in the same building on February 6, 1992.

== History ==
The United States has maintained continuous official diplomatic relations with the Republic of Estonia since July 28, 1922. Frederick W. B. Coleman of Minnesota was appointed to be the first U.S. Envoy Extraordinary and Minister Plenipotentiary to the Baltic States on September 20, 1922. He presented his credentials in Tallinn on November 20, 1922. From 1919 to 1922, U.S. interests in the Republic of Estonia were represented by a U.S. Commissioner based in Riga (Latvia) and a U.S. Consul based in Tallinn. Estonian diplomats have been accredited to the U.S. Department of State since 1922 and Estonian consular representatives have operated in the United States continuously since 1920. After the occupation of Estonia by the Soviet Union on June 17, 1940, U.S. Under Secretary of State Sumner Welles issued a statement on July 23, 1940 which established the U.S. Government's official policy of non-recognition. As a result, the United States never recognized the forcible incorporation of Estonia and the other Baltic republics of Latvia and Lithuania into the Soviet Union. Following the restoration of Estonia's independence on August 20, 1991, the United States announced its readiness to re-establish full relations with the Republic of Estonia on September 2, 1991. The Embassy of the United States of America began official operations on Wednesday, October 2, 1991, at twelve o'clock. Robert C. Frasure of West Virginia was appointed the first U.S. Ambassador Extraordinary and Plenipotentiary to Estonia on March 23, 1992. He presented his credentials on April 9, 1992. Ties between the two nations have grown closer since Estonia's accession to NATO and the European Union in 2004.

== U.S. representation in Estonia ==
Since January 20, 2025, the United States has been represented in Estonia by Chargé d'affaires Matthew E. Wall. Present at the post are officials from the Department of State, the Department of Defense, the Federal Bureau of Investigation, and the U.S. Secret Service. Regional representation includes the Departments of Homeland Security, Commerce and Agriculture as well as the Drug Enforcement Administration.

== Building ==
Following the United States’ announcement of its readiness to re-establish full relations with the Republic of Estonia on September 2, 1991, The Embassy of the United States of America began official operations on Wednesday, October 2, 1991, in temporary chancery offices located at the Palace Hotel. The United States Mission to Estonia resumed operations in the current U.S. Embassy chancery building located on Kentmanni Street on February 6, 1992 – the same building which housed the U.S. Legation to Estonia from April 1, 1930, until it was forced to close on September 5, 1940.

As of April 2021, preparations are underway for the development of a new embassy compound, in partnership with the city of Tallinn and the government of Estonia. In June 2023, Ambassador Kent signed an agreement with the Estonian Ministry of Foreign Affairs to purchase land between Suur-Ameerika (Big America) and Väike-Ameerika (Small America) streets for the construction of a new U.S. embassy.

== List of consuls general and ambassadors ==
The consulate in Reval (now Tallinn) operated from 1805 to around 1814, from 1867 to 1870 and from 1910 on.

List of United States Consuls General in Reval
Name	Position	Official residence	Appointment	Arrival	Termination
Dietrich Rodde	vice-agent (later vice-consul)	Reval	1805-05-13	1805-05-13	May 1814?
Henry Stacey	consul general	Vermont	1867		1869
Waldemar Mayer	consul general	Reval	1868		1868
Samuel D. Jones	consul general	New York	1869		1869
Eugene Schuyler	consul general	New York	1869		1870
Christian Rotermann	consul general	Reval	1910		1914

== Bibliography ==
- Saul, Norman E. (1996). "Appendix D: Secretaries of Legation and Consuls in Russia". Concord and Conflict: The United States and Russia, 1867–1914. Lawrence: University Press of Kansas. pp. 597–600. ISBN 9780700607549.
- Bashkina, Nina N.; et al. (1980). The United States and Russia: The Beginning of Relations, 1765–1815. Washington: United States Government Printing Office. LCCN 80-607939.
- Bashkina, Nina N.; et al. (1980a). "U.S. Diplomatic and Consular Appointments to Russia, 1780–1815". The United States and Russia: The Beginning of Relations, 1765–1815. Washington: United States Government Printing Office. pp. 1111–1112. LCCN 80-607939.
