= List of women military historians =

This is a list of women military historians. Traditionally an overwhelmingly male-dominated discipline, women began entering the field with the turn towards the 'new military history' of the 1960s. Pioneering women military historians included Joanna Bourke and Amanda Foreman, who contributed to re-orientating military history towards a "multidisciplinary approach that embeds war in its political, social, cultural and personal contexts". However, women remain under-represented in academic military history.

== List ==
- Beth Bailey
- Joan Beaumont
- Evelyn Berckman
- Ruth Bettina Birn
- Joanna Bourke
- Anne Curry
- Shauna Devine
- Elisabeth Joan Doyle
- Gabriela Dudeková
- Lesley J. Gordon
- Heike B. Görtemaker
- Mercedes Graf
- Drew Gilpin Faust
- Amanda Foreman
- Karen Hagemann
- Ellen Hammer
- Beatrice Heuser
- Ruth E. Hodge
- Isabel V. Hull
- Ann Hyland
- Sheila Miyoshi Jager
- Kimberly Kagan
- Jennifer D. Keene
- Galina Kozhevnikova
- Elizabeth D. Leonard
- Lisa Lines
- Ella Lonn
- Lyn Macdonald
- Margaret MacMillan
- Chandra Manning
- Loretta Napoleoni
- Elizabeth Norman
- Sarah C. Paine
- Reina Pennington
- Martha Settle Putney
- Carol Reardon
- Terese Pencak Schwartz
- Isabel Giberne Sieveking
- Florence Warfield Sillers
- Rose Mary Sheldon
- Jean A. Stuntz
- Pamela D. Toler
- Barbara W. Tuchman
- Kerstin von Lingen
- Marilyn B. Young

== See also ==
- List of military historians
- Women in the military
