= List of children of Holocaust survivors =

List of offspring of Holocaust survivors with their own Wikipedia entries:

== A ==
- Yitzhak Aharonovich
- Chantal Akerman
- Avi Arad
- Yardena Arazi
- Charles Ardai
- Uri Ariel
- Shlomo Artzi
- Amotz Asa-El
- Gabi Ashkenazi
- Mickey Avalon
- Emanuel Ax
- Yank Azman

== B ==
- Blanche Baker
- Gad Barzilai
- Gary Baseman
- Yishai Beer
- Avi Beker
- Jeanne Beker
- Nitza Ben-Dov
- Daniel Berger (physician)
- Aliza Bin-Noun
- Wolf Blitzer
- Lili Bosse
- Timothy Boyle
- Benjamin Brafman
- William Breitbart
- Lily Brett
- Pedro Brieger
- John Browne, Baron Browne of Madingley

== C ==
- Michael Cohen (lawyer)

== D ==
- Judy Darcy
- Nir Davidovich
- Chaim Deutsch
- Avi Dichter
- Jessica Durlacher

== E ==
- Sam Egan
- Steve Eichel
- Barry Eichengreen
- Bernice Eisenstein
- Freddy Eytan

== F ==
- Avigdor Feldman
- Pablo Fenjves
- Emanuele Fiano
- Norman Finkelstein
- David Fisher (filmmaker)
- Dudu Fisher
- Gideon Fisher
- Shimon Fogel
- Ari Folman
- Miloš Forman
- Jean-Pierre Foucault
- George Friedman
- Michel Friedman
- Justine Frischmann
- Diane von Fürstenberg

== G ==
- Marc Gafni
- Yoav Gallant
- Benny Gantz
- Herschel Garfein
- Mordechai Geldman
- Julius Genachowski
- Zvi Gendelman
- Jacob Gildor
- Pesi Girsch
- Louis Gonda
- Azriel Graeber
- David Granirer
- Harlan Greene
- Yossi Gross
- Michael Grunstein
- Emil Grunzweig
- Eli Guttman
- Howard Gutman

== H ==
- Michael Hafftka
- Moshe Halbertal
- Michael Martin Hammer
- Ilan Harari
- Idit Harel
- Shmuel Hasfari
- Amira Hass
- Ricardo Hausmann
- Esther Hayut
- Sandy Helberg
- Daniel Hershkowitz
- Paul Heyman
- Dov Hikind
- Uzi Hitman
- Ron Hoenig
- Chaviva Hošek

== J ==
- Mariss Jansons

== K ==
- Samuel Kassow
- Aviva Kempner
- Rivka Keren
- Morton Klein
- Hy Kloc
- Alex Kozinski
- Wolf Krakowski
- Karl Kruszelnicki
- Charles Kushner
- Murray Kushner

== L ==
- Evelyn Lauder
- Geoffrey Laurence
- Geddy Lee
- Martin Lemelman
- Yosef Yitzchok Lerner
- Dani Levy
- Bernard Lewinsky
- Daniel Libeskind
- Hadassah Lieberman
- Savyon Liebrecht
- Rabbi Aaron Lopiansky

== M ==
- Yossi Maiman
- Haim Maor
- Yaron Margolin
- Ivan Margolius
- Alejandro Mayorkas
- Aryeh Mekel
- David Miliband
- Ed Miliband
- Adir Miller
- Benzion Miller
- Agi Mishol
- Leonard Mlodinow
- Dominique Moïsi
- Goldie Morgentaler
- Yohanan Moyal

== N ==
- Avi Nesher

== O ==
- Aliza Olmert

== P ==
- Borut Pahor
- Sheffi Paz
- Steve Pestka
- Jeremy Podeswa
- Yehuda Poliker
- Jack Nusan Porter
- Joseph Potasnik

== R ==
- Tommy Ramone
- Genya Ravan
- Arie Reich
- Howard Reich
- Ivan Reitman
- Shai Reshef
- Aby Rosen
- Menachem Z. Rosensaft
- Marissa Roth
- Marvin Rotrand
- Dave Rubinstein

== S ==
- Judah Samet
- Lydia Sarfati
- Lynn Schenk
- Robert Schriesheim
- Terese Pencak Schwartz
- Nava Semel
- Ari Shaffir
- Florence Shapiro
- Miri Shilon
- Simcha Shirman
- Gene Simmons
- Itamar Singer
- Hillel Slovak
- Eli Somer
- Art Spiegelman
- Jerry Springer
- Axel Stawski
- David Steiner (academic)
- Elazar Stern
- Jessica Stern
- Nadine Strossen
- Guy Stroumsa
- Katrina Swett
- Andrzej Szpilman

== T ==
- Adi Talmor
- Elhanan Tannenbaum
- Austen Tayshus
- Nancy Tellem

== W ==
- Yocheved Weinfeld
- Mindy Weisel
- Suzi Weiss-Fischmann
- Thomas Ernst Josef Wiedemann
- Elisha Wiesel
- Leon Wieseltier
- Zygi Wilf
- Nina Willner
- Alan Wilzig
- Ivan Wilzig
- Leon de Winter
- Freda L. Wolfson

== Y ==
- Moshe Ya'alon
- Hanna Yablonka
- Shelly Yachimovich
- Catherine Yronwode

== Z ==
- Jerry Zaks
- Hermann Zapf
- Anita Zucker
- Ayelet Zurer
- Ben Zyskowicz
