= Daniel Berger =

Daniel Berger may refer to:

- Daniel Berger (engraver) (1744–1825), German engraver
- Daniel Berger (golfer) (born 1993), American golfer
- Daniel Berger (physician) (born 1957), American physician
