= Annapolis Convention =

Annapolis Convention may refer to:

- Annapolis Convention (1774–1776), the Revolutionary War government of Maryland
- Annapolis Convention (1786), which led to the Philadelphia Constitutional Convention of 1787

== See also ==
- Annapolis Conference, a Middle East peace conference which took place in 2007
