= Jewish-American working class =

The Jewish-American working class consists of Jewish Americans who have a working-class socioeconomic status within the American class structure. American Jews were predominantly working-class and often working poor for much of American history, particularly between 1880 and the 1930s. During this period, Ashkenazi Eastern European Jewish immigrants constituted the majority of the Jewish-American working class. By the mid-1950s, the Jewish-American community had become predominantly middle class. Stereotypes commonly depict American Jews as fundamentally upwardly mobile and middle class to upper class. Despite the "imagined norm" that American Jews are "middle-class, white, straight [sic] Ashkenazi", many Jewish Americans are working class and around 15% of American Jews live in poverty.

== History ==
=== 1700s ===
In 1784, the Hebrew Benevolent Society was founded by Jews in Charleston, South Carolina to aid ill Jewish immigrants, expanding their mission in 1824 to the Jewish poor of the city. The Society helped poor Jews bury their dead, acquire heating fuel, and buy matzah for Passover.

=== 1800s and 1900s ===
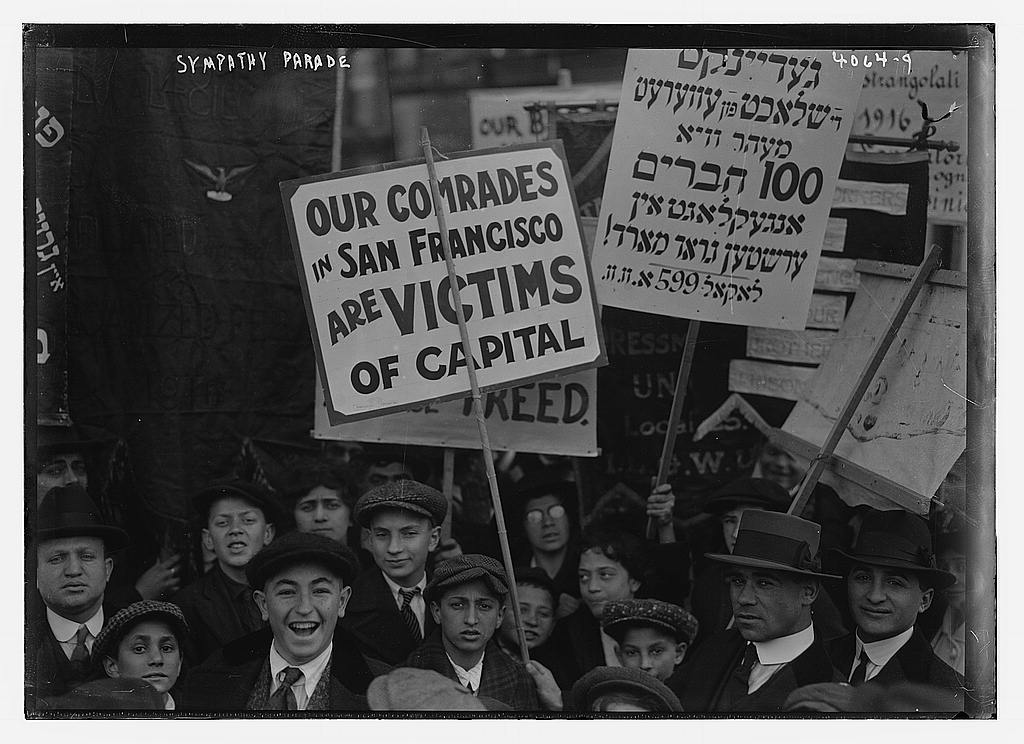
Sympathy Labor Parade, New York City, 1916. One sign is in Yiddish.

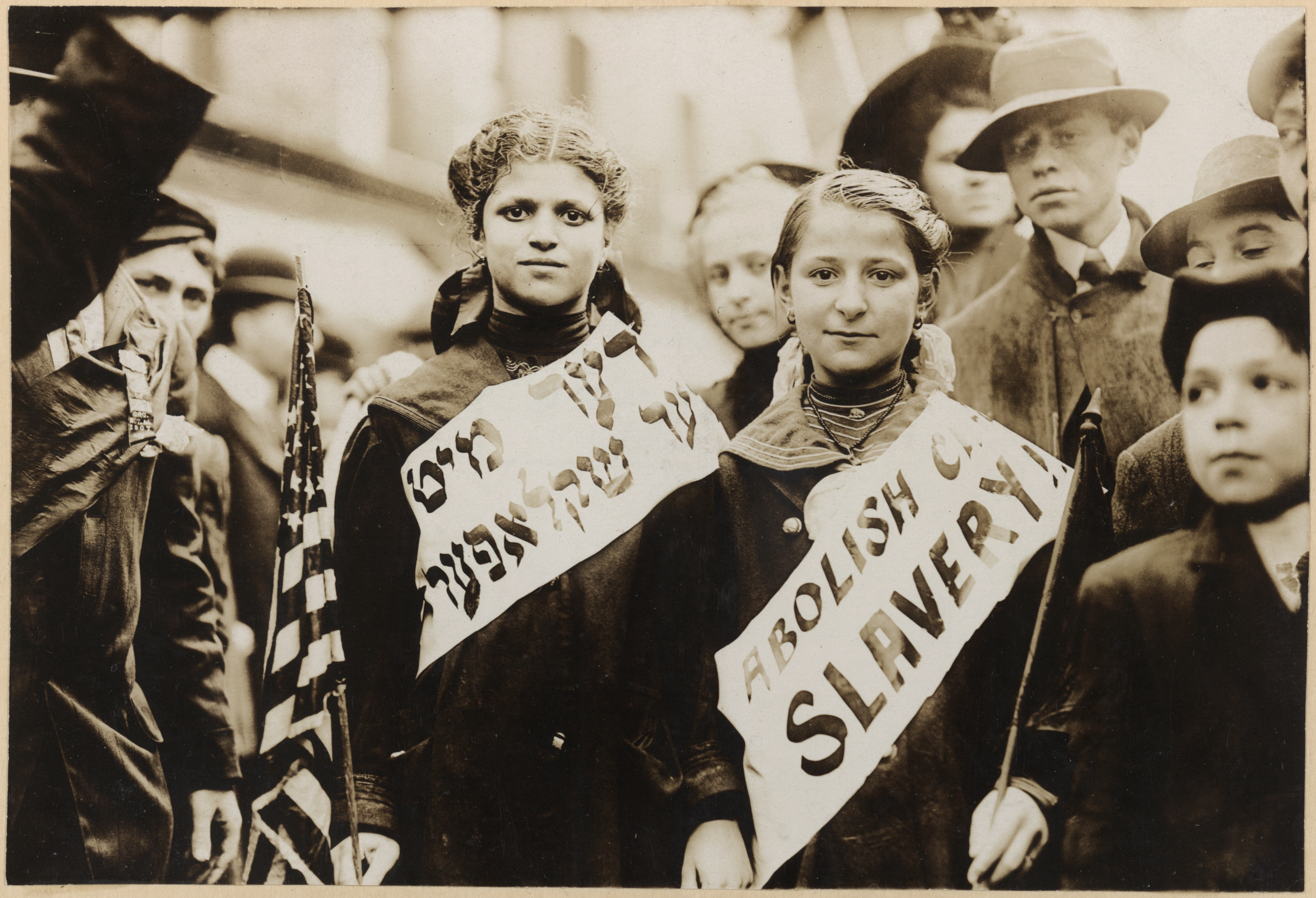
Portrait of two girls wearing banners with slogan "Abolish Child Slavery!!" in English and Yiddish ("(ני)דער מיט (קינד)ער שקלאפער(ײ)", "Nider mit Kinder Schklawerii"). Probably taken during May 1, 1909 labor parade in New York City.

Historically, German Jews in the United States were more affluent on average than Eastern European Jews. Between 1880 and 1924, prior to the passage of the anti-immigrant and antisemitic Immigration Act of 1924, two and a half million Jews immigrated to the United States. Many settled in New York City, especially on the Lower East Side. Radical Jewish immigrants, particularly anarchists, socialists and communists, were active in creating the Jewish American labor movement. The Jewish labor movement also shaped the lives of working-class Jewish communities in cities such as Baltimore, Boston, Chicago, and Philadelphia.

In Baltimore during the late 1800s and early 1900s, class divisions within the Ashkenazi Jewish community were often correlated with national background. In comparison to the wealthier and assimilated German Jews who had immigrated earlier, Russian Jews were largely poor immigrants who lived in slums with other Russians. The German-Russian divide among Baltimore's Jewry existed for at least a century and caused many Russian Jews to initially associate more with the Russian community than the wider Jewish community. Baltimore's Russian and Russian-Jewish community was originally centered in Southeast Baltimore.

By the 1920s, the Boyle Heights neighborhood of Los Angeles was a predominantly working-class and lower-middle-class Jewish community. Jewish immigrants had begun to settle in Boyle Heights around 1900. It was known as the Lower East Side of LA, as many Orthodox Jewish Yiddish-speaking immigrants from Russia settled in the neighborhood. The Boyle Heights Jewish community featured "a vibrant, pre-World War II, Yiddish-speaking community, replete with small shops along Brooklyn Avenue, union halls, synagogues and hyperactive politics ... shaped by the enduring influence of the Socialist and Communist parties." Assimilated middle-class Jews, many of whom were Reform, tended to live in another neighborhood that was located west of downtown Los Angeles. Beginning in the 1940s, Mexican Americans began to settle in Boyle Heights, leading to white flight as white working-class Jews began to move outside of the neighborhood.

By 1955, American Jews of Eastern European descent were perceived as "fundamentally middle class", having attained a similar socioeconomic status to the German Jews before them. The post-war period is often regarded as a "golden age" for American Jews, as many previously working-class Ashkenazi Jews from Eastern European backgrounds were able to move up the economic ladder into the middle class.

In the 1970s and 1980s, tens of thousands of working-class Jews, many of whom were from New York or who were Holocaust survivors, settled in the South Beach neighborhood of Miami Beach, Florida. South Beach was known as the "shtetl by the bay" and had a thriving working-class Yiddish culture. As developers poured money into South Beach, the neighborhood rapidly gentrified, displacing many of the elderly and working-class Jews who lived there.

=== 21st-century Jewish working-class ===
Contemporary poverty is common among Orthodox Jews, particularly within Haredi and Hasidic communities, as well as among Russian-speaking Jewish immigrants from the former Soviet Union, Jewish senior citizens, disabled Jews, and Holocaust survivors. 45% of Hasidic families in New York City live in poverty or near-poverty. During the 2000s and early 2010s, the poverty rate had doubled among Jewish New Yorkers. Brooklyn has been called "the capital of Jewish poverty in North America". Between 1991 and 2011, the numbers of impoverished Jewish households increased from 70,000 to 130,000.

The Metropolitan Council on Jewish Poverty, founded in 1972, provides services to impoverished Jewish New Yorkers. Masbia, a network of kosher soup kitchens, provides food for poor and homeless Jews throughout the city.

By 2007, while poverty still existed among Orthodox Jews in South Florida, poverty was lesser than it was historically. While South Florida's Orthodox community were once primarily working-class first generation immigrants, many Orthodox Jews have become college educated and work professional jobs, particularly among Centrist and Modern Orthodox Jews. While upward mobility has been common throughout the Jewish community of South Florida, Orthodox Jews have had to face obstacles such as the cost of a Jewish education and the restrictions of being Shomer Shabbat, such as not working during Shabbat.

During the early 2000s and 2010s, the gentrification of Brooklyn greatly affected working-class Hasidim. Working-class Satmar residents suffered due to increasing rents, overcrowding, and displacement. Working-class Satmar and Hasidic community activists created HaVaad leHatsolos Vioyamsburg (Committee to Save Williamsburg), which objected to the presence of what they called the "artistn" (Yiddish for "artists") - the predominantly white, young, upper-middle class hipsters and artists living in Williamsburg. The committee recommended boycotting and shunning the hipster "artistn". Satmar leaders regarded the hipsters as morally bankrupt and economically disruptive, and worried that Hasidic youths would relate more to the hipsters than to working-class African-Americans and Puerto Ricans living in the neighborhood.

In 2022, the Jewish Federation of San Diego County launched a campaign to reduce poverty within the Jewish community of San Diego.

== Politics ==
During the late 1800s and early 1900s, most working-class and lower-middle class Jewish immigrants did not support the Zionist movement, according to Middle Eastern studies professor Zachary Lockman of New York University. Benjamin Balthaser, associate professor of multiethnic literature at Indiana University South Bend, has claimed that the Zionist movement has a "distinct class character", writing that working-class Jewish communists historically opposed Zionism as a right-wing form of bourgeois nationalism. However, this was not representative of the Jewish working class as a whole. The Labor Zionist Organization of America, the American branch of Poale Zion, as well as the Yidish Natsionaler Arbeter Farband and Habonim Dror were common organizations among the Jewish working class in the early 1900s.

Most of the Jewish American working class has been largely left-wing, but that hasn't been the case in all instances. During its founding in the 1960s, the working class children of Holocaust survivors were the most likely demographic to join Meir Kahane's Jewish Defense League in New York City, a radical right movement promoting terrorism, anti-communism, and anti-Arab racism, acting as the fringe, violent and right-wing nationalist wing of the otherwise mainstream, peaceful, and broadly center-left liberal Soviet Jewry movement.

Some commentators have claimed that Bernie Sanders, raised in a working-class Jewish community in Brooklyn, embodies a political strain that is influenced by the historical legacy of secular working-class Jewish-American radicalism in New York City and other urban centers.

== Popular culture ==
A 2023 study conducted by TEN (formerly known as the National Affinity Group on Jewish Poverty) found that poor and working-class Jews are underrepresented in American film and television. TEN's executive Rachel Sumekh said that Jews are often portrayed as rich in American popular culture, which feeds into antisemitic stereotypes, saying that "People are still very surprised to hear that 20 percent of the Jewish community is experiencing poverty."

Roseanne Barr, born into a white working-class Jewish family in Salt Lake City, played a "nominally half-Jewish, working-class wife and mother" in the popular sitcom series Roseanne. Although some commentators have mistakenly claimed that Jewishness is not mentioned on the Roseanne show, the "half-Jewish" character Roseanne Conner is depicted as having a Jewish father. The Jewishness of Roseanne Barr and her character Roseanne Connor has sometimes been overlooked, a fact that some commentators have claimed is because of public perceptions that Jewishness is at odds with being part of the white working class, in part because of antisemitic stereotypes that depict Jews as wealthy as well as Jewish self-representations of Jews as being middle class. Barr has referred to Roseanne Conner as a "Jewish mother".

In The Nanny, Fran Drescher played Fran Fine, a working-class Jewish woman from Flushing, Queens, who is employed by a wealthy British-American family.

Adam Sandler played a working-class Jewish character in the 2018 comedy film The Week Of. Several other movies starring Sandler feature working-class Jewish protagonists including Happy Gilmore (1996), Big Daddy (1999), and Eight Crazy Nights (2002), the latter of which has Sandler voice Davey Stone, a 33-year old Jewish alcoholic living in a trailer while his love interest Jennifer Friedman is a Jewish single mother working a minimum wage job at a Dunkin' Donuts kiosk inside a mall.

Multiple American children's animated series feature working class Jewish families, often contrasting them with their wealthier counterparts. Rugrats features Didi Pickles, a high school teacher and the daughter of Eastern European Jewish immigrants, who is framed as being the "opposite" of her non-Jewish sister-in-law Charlotte, a wealthy, glamorous, and narcissistic CEO. As Told By Ginger features a hardworking underpaid nurse, Lois Foutley, who is revealed to be the daughter of a rabbi. Arthur has among its main cast the tomboyish Francine Frensky whose father is a garbageman. Francine is shown to be the antithesis of her snooty best friend Muffy Crosswire. Hey Alma's Arielle Haz writes "Francine never fit any of the stereotypes you normally see around Jews in the media; she wasn’t nerdy and her family wasn’t rich. She was just a Jewish kid making her way through life."

== See also ==
- 1902 kosher meat boycott
- Borscht Belt
- Jewish views of poverty, wealth and charity
- Jews without Money
- Metropolitan Council on Jewish Poverty
- Jewish Defense League
