= Tal Becker =

Australian-Israeli lawyer (born 1972)

Tal Becker (Hebrew: טל בקר; born 1972) is an Australian-Israeli lawyer, diplomatic advisor, and civil servant. He is recognized as an international law expert. Throughout the 1990s through 2005, Becker was a legal advisor in the Israel Defense Forces, Ministry of Foreign Affairs, and the Israeli mission to the United Nations.

During Tzipi Livni's tenure as Israeli Foreign Minister from 2006 to 2009, Becker was one of her closest advisors and confidants on diplomatic and legal matters. He was Israel's lead negotiator at the Annapolis Conference in 2007.

In January 2024, Becker was on the legal team defending Israel in the case brought before the International Court of Justice by South Africa accusing Israel of Genocide.

== Early life ==
Becker was born Tal-Ev Moshe Zrihan in Paris, France, in 1972. His father was Moroccan and a university professor of ancient Semitic languages. His mother grew up in Melbourne, Australia, and was from a Polish family that had been decimated in the Holocaust. His parents met in the late 1960s in Jerusalem, where they were both new immigrants. When Becker was 4 years old, his parents divorced and he moved with his mother and grandparents to Melbourne, where he attended Leibler Yavneh College, a Modern Orthodox Jewish school. After high school, Becker studied at the Yeshivat Har Etzion for a year.

== Career ==
After completing an arts degree in Melbourne, with a specialty in international law, Becker moved to Israel in 1994. In an interview with the Sydney Morning Herald, Becker credited a desire "to be part of the future of my people" as a driving factor for moving to Israel. Becker arrived in Israel while the Oslo peace process was underway. Israel had a shortage of English-speaking international lawyers, and Becker was appointed a legal adviser to the Gaza Division in the Israel Defense Forces to build the foundational mechanisms for economic and security cooperation between Israel and the newly created Palestinian Authority. During his military service, he was also involved in negotiations over a "safe passage" between the West Bank and Gaza.

In 1998, Becker joined the Israeli Ministry of Foreign Affairs (MFA) and was a legal advisor to the Israeli delegations at subsequent peace process efforts. During the 2000 Camp David Summit, he was called on daily by the Israeli delegation for legal advice on borders and refugees. In 2001, Becker went to New York to earn his doctorate at Columbia University and serve as legal counsel at the Israeli Mission to the United Nations, arriving a week before the September 11 attacks. Then Israeli Deputy Permanent Representative to the UN Aryeh Mekel called Becker the "most important professional in the delegation." Foreign ambassadors would often send Becker their speeches for comment. Owing to his network and high opinion among international legal scholars, he was elected vice chairman of the United Nations General Assembly's legal committee in 2003, the first Israeli at such a high-level post in more than 40 years.

During Tzipi Livni's tenure as Israeli Foreign Minister from 2006 to 2009, Becker was one of her closest advisors and confidants on diplomatic and legal matters. In July 2006, he wrote a proposal for a "diplomatic exit" from the Second Lebanon War that eventually became the basis for UN Security Council Resolution 1701, ending the war. After the war, Becker hung a framed copy of the resolution in his office, albeit crooked, in order to not forget that the "resolution was far from perfect."

He was Israel's lead negotiator at the Annapolis Conference in 2007, when Livni was head of the negotiating team, with Becker doing much negotiating with Palestinian negotiator Saeb Erekat in 2008 over the refugee issue, developing positive relationships with his Palestinian counterparts. Notes regarding Erekat and Becker's talks were later leaked as part of the Palestine Papers. According to an Al-Jazeera English analysis of Palestine Papers notes, Becker was an "influential behind-the-scenes figure" during meetings with Palestinians.

After leaving government service, Becker was a senior fellow at the Washington Institute for Near East Policy from 2010 to 2012. By 2013, he returned to government as principal deputy legal advisor and then the director of international law at the Israeli MFA.

He was also a key figure in drafting and negotiating the historic peace and normalization agreements, known as the "Abraham Accords", in 2020 between Israel and the UAE, Bahrain and Morocco.

Becker was on the Israeli team for the 2024 case before the International Court of Justice. In his opening speech, Becker accused South Africa of bringing "a grossly distorted story" and argued that the suffering of Israeli and Palestinian civilians was the result of Hamas's strategy.

Becker currently serves as vice president for the Shalom Hartman Institute in Jerusalem

== Scholarship ==
His PhD dissertation became the basis of his 2006 book Terrorism and the State: Rethinking the Rules of State Responsibility, which won the 2007 Guggenheim Prize for best international book from the Guggenheim Foundation. In the book, Becker reconceptualizes the rules of state responsibility to reflect modern forms of state involvement in private acts of terrorism. The book traces the evolution of the law of state responsibility, particularly how international doctrine from the early 20th century onward increasingly exempted states from the actions of private actors. Becker argued that the "agency paradigm" of state responsibility failed to reflect the nature of the interactions between states and private terrorist actors in the 21st century. Further, he suggests that current theories of state responsibility do not offer an appropriate framework for dealing with state's involvement in terrorism. In the final part of the book, Becker proposes to apply causation-based responsibility and to treat the state as legally responsible for terrorist acts that are the result of the state's omission or wrongful acts as a supplemental tool to the "agency paradigm". One example that Becker uses is to compare Iran and Syria to a fireman who stands next to a store and hands out matches and kerosene to arsonists.

Writing in International Affairs, Aurel Sari, Associate Professor of Public International Law at the University of Exeter praised Terrorism and the State as a "tightly argued yet elegantly written piece of legal scholarship...convincingly shoring how principles of causation can be employed" and "an important contribution to the law of state responsibility."

In Political Science Quarterly, legal scholar Eric Posner describes Becker as a "learned and careful commentator, and international lawyers will benefit from reading his book."

== Personal life ==
Becker is married to Rebecca and has six children. They live in Jerusalem.
