= Mekel =

Mekel can refer to:

== People ==
- Aryeh Mekel, Israeli diplomat and journalist
- Gal Mekel (born 1988), Israeli NBA basketball player
- Once Mekel (born 1970), Indonesian singer
