= Jewish views of poverty, wealth and charity =

Over the course of Jewish history, different attitudes have been held towards poverty and wealth. Unlike Christianity, in which some strands have viewed poverty as virtuous and desirable, Jews have generally viewed poverty negatively. Jacobs and Greer assert, "In general, Jewish texts have portrayed poverty as an unjustifiable burden". In contrast to the consistently negative view of poverty, Kravitz and Olitzky describe a rapidly changing attitude towards acceptance of wealth as desirable as the Hebrews transitioned from being nomadic shepherds to farmers, then ultimately to city dwellers.

In Kol ben Levi, the author writes, "There are two trials before the individual: the test of wealth and the test of poverty... both are difficult... but the test of wealth is greater than (the test of) poverty." Cosimo Perrotta points out that servile and hired work was not scorned by the Jews of the Tanakh (Sacred Scriptures, so-called "Old Testament"). Instead, such work was protected by biblical commandments to pay workers on time and not to cheat them.

For there are poverty and wealth in every occupation. One's occupation does not cause poverty, nor does it bring wealth. All is determined based on one's merit.

== Poverty ==
Ronald Eisenberg writes that, unlike the classical Christian view, "the Rabbis saw no virtue in poverty". Lifshitz asserts that, "very rarely in Judaism is poverty associated with righteousness". Instead of being considered virtuous and desirable, poverty was viewed as "pointless suffering". Similarly, Cosimo Perrotta points out that poverty is not admired nor is it considered a positive value by the writers of the Tanakh. However, Ethics of the Fathers states: "Such is the way of Torah: Bread with salt you shall eat, water in small measure you shall drink, and upon the ground, you shall sleep; live a life of deprivation and toil in Torah. If so you do, 'fortunate are you, and good is to you' (Psalms 128:2): Fortunate are you in this world, and it is good to you in the World To Come."

=== Charity ===
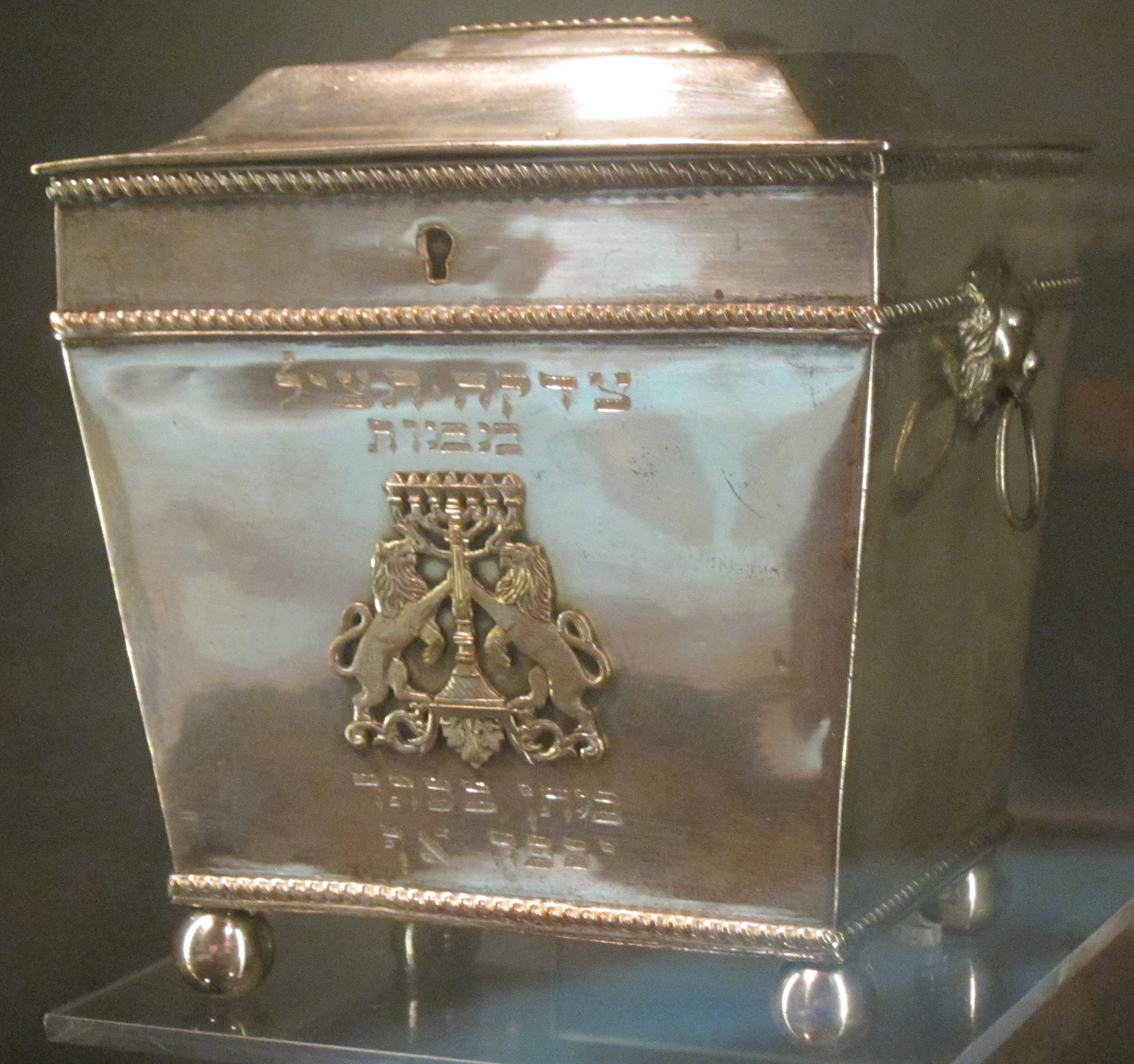
Tzedakah box (Pushke), Charleston, 1820, silver, National Museum of American Jewish History.

Tzedakah ([tsedaˈka] or Ṣ'daqah [sˤəðaːˈqaː] in Classical Hebrew (Hebrew: צדקה; Arabic: صدقة), is a Hebrew word literally meaning "justice" or "righteousness" but commonly used to signify "charity", though it is a different concept than charity because tzedakah is an obligation and charity is typically understood as a spontaneous act of goodwill and a marker of generosity. It is based on the Hebrew word (צדק, tzedek) meaning "righteousness", "fairness" or "justice", and it is related to the Hebrew word Tzadik meaning "righteous" as an adjective (or "righteous individual" as a noun in the form of a substantive). In Judaism, tzedakah refers to the religious obligation to do what is right and just, which Judaism emphasises are important parts of living a spiritual life. Maimonides says that, while the second-highest form of tzedakah is to give donations anonymously to unknown recipients, the highest form is to give a gift, loan, or partnership that will result in the recipient supporting himself, instead of living upon others. Unlike philanthropy or charity, which is completely voluntary, tzedakah is seen as a religious obligation, which must be performed regardless of financial standing, and must even be performed by poor people. Tzedakah is considered to be one of the three main acts that can annul a less than favourable heavenly decree.

=== Obligation to avoid poverty ===
Lifshitz asserts that, because poverty is something to be avoided, Jews are exhorted to earn their living through gainful employment. Jewish law calls upon Jews to do everything in their power to avoid becoming a burden on others. They are to be responsible for their own welfare and not to rely on the community to provide for them. Although the wealthy are called upon to be charitable to the poor, Lifshitz insists that this does not absolve the poor from their responsibility to earn a living. He argues that the Law does not mandate redistribution of wealth and that, in Judaism, the property of the wealthy is theirs to do with entirely as they please.

=== Protection of the poor ===
Although poverty is neither virtuous nor desirable, Judaic Law commands that the poor are to be respected and protected. According to Jacobs and Greer, "The overarching Jewish attitude toward the poor can be best summed up in a single word: achikha (your brother). Jews are enjoined by the Torah to resist any temptation to view the poor as somehow different from themselves. The Tanakh sets forth numerous protections of the poor. As an example of such protections, Perotta points out that the poor were protected from being exploited when in debt. Perrotta asserts that the goal of these commandments was "not only to protect the poor but also to prevent the excessive accumulation of wealth in a few hands". In essence, the poor man is "protected by God". Kravitz and Olitzky cite the Jubilee (yoveil) and the sh'mitah as examples of commandments in the Torah designed to protect the poor.

== Wealth ==
According to Joseph Lifshitz, "Jewish tradition insists that man can, and should, have a powerful impact on the material world." Perrotta asserts that material wealth is highly valued in the Tanakh; the Hebrews seek it and God promises to bless them with it if they will follow his commandments. Joseph Francis Kelly writes that biblical writers portray God as enabling men such as Abraham, Isaac, Jacob, and Solomon to achieve wealth and that this wealth was considered a clear sign of divine favour. Kelly notes that the Old Testament also insisted on the rich aid the poor. Prophets such as Amos castigated the rich for oppressing the poor and crushing the needy. In summary, Kelly writes, "the Old Testament saw wealth as something good, but warned the wealthy not to use their position to harm those with less. The rich had an obligation to alleviate the sufferings of the poor."

== Evolution of attitudes towards wealth and poverty in the Tanakh ==
In contrast to the consistently negative view of poverty, Kravitz and Olitzky describe a rapidly changing attitude towards acceptance of wealth as desirable as the Hebrews transitioned from being nomadic shepherds to farmers and ultimately to city dwellers. They assert that the three divisions in the Tanakh starting with Abraham can be viewed as representing three chronological periods in Jewish history: the wilderness, the land and the city. The Hebrews are depicted in the Tanakh first as nomadic shepherds, then as farmers and finally as urban dwellers.

Kravitz and Olitzky assert that, during the time of the Patriarchs through the years in the wilderness, wealth seemed to have been "held in common with no real distinctions between the rich and the poor". However, they note that the possibility for individual wealth arose as the Hebrews transitioned from a nomadic pastoral society to a more agrarian economy. They cite early prophets such as Amos, who viewed themselves as the heirs of the pastoral tradition and spoke out against those who oppressed the poor. The transition of Jewish society to an urban economy in the Hellenistic period intensified the societal issues surrounding poverty and wealth. Kravitz and Olitzky characterize rabbinic Judaism as "the Judaism of the city" rather than that of the shepherd or the farmer. As such, rabbinical Judaism found it necessary to address the needs of business and commerce including the need to raise money and protect capital investments. As an example of such accommodations, Kravitz and Olitzky cite Hillel's invention of p'rozbol, a legal fiction to nullify the requirements of the sh'mitah. According to Joseph Lifshitz, "Jewish tradition insists that man can, and should, have a powerful impact on the material world."

== Individual charity and public welfare ==
Aaron Levine comments that although the concept of public welfare is an integral part of the modern state, its historical origins are relatively recent, from the late 19th century. According to Levine, the key concept of the welfare state is that voluntarism alone does not sufficiently address the needs of the poor and the disadvantaged and so government steps in to complement private efforts by establishing programs to guarantee a minimum standard of living and to protect individuals against certain adverse events. Levine points out that, in Judaism, these principles can be traced back to Talmudic times (300 B.C.E. to 500 C.E.) and are embodied in Jewish Law (Halakah). Levine characterizes the Judaic approach to social welfare as a "dual anti-poverty system, consisting of private and public components".

=== Emergence of organized public charities ===
Lifshitz writes that "the concept of welfare in Jewish law rests primarily on various socio-agricultural commandments of the Torah". He cites commandments that mandate the reservation of part of the harvest for the poor. However, he notes that, although the Torah explicitly commands charity to the poor, there are very few specific commandments that promulgate charity outside of the provisions that are tied to agriculture. Lifshitz surmises that the general commandment mandating charity combined with the agriculture-related provisions may have been adequate to provide for the poor in an agrarian economy but, as Jewish society became increasingly urban in a Hellenistic society, the poor lost the lifeline formerly provided by the commandments that were tied to an agricultural society. Since the urban poor no longer had access to the fields, the commandments that mandated that a portion of the harvest to be set aside for them were no longer suitable for providing for their needs. This required the rabbis to expand the doctrine of charity to provide not only food but also money and other means of subsistence. One example of this was the institution of the custom of donating one-tenth of all profits to charity, along with the model of the agricultural tithes for the poor.

According to Lifshitz, the shift from an agrarian society to an urban one enabled a transformation of charity from the independent actions of individuals to the concerted efforts of groups working in an organized fashion. Jewish communal life was modelled after the Hellenistic polis and among the public functionaries were collectors and disbursers of communal charity (gabbaim). Lifshitz notes that even though the institutionalization of communal charity competed with "the personal and individual character of charity", this existence of communal charity did not relieve the individual from his personal obligation to support the needy. Thus, although the community collected welfare taxes from its members, this represented a minimum level of charitable giving and was not intended to supplant or displace personal charitable donations to friends or relatives.

== Philanthropy ==
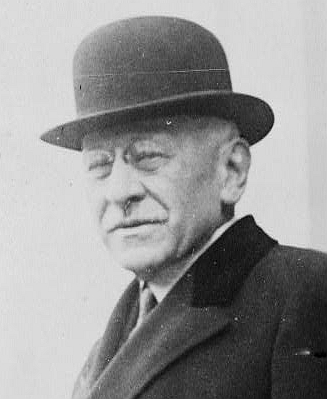
Julius Rosenwald

Philanthropy is an important part of Jewish culture, and many prominent Jews have made large donations to charitable causes. Derek Penslar speculates that the philanthropic tradition in the Jewish community originated in the early nineteenth century . Jewish community leaders provided funds to train Jewish youths in farming and handicrafts.

Retail magnate Julius Rosenwald donated a large amount of money to support the education of African-Americans. Jacob Schiff provided funds to help new Jewish émigrés from Russia and Europe settle in the United States. Marvin Perry quotes Jewish banker Otto Kahn as justifying his philanthropy by saying "I must atone for my wealth". Jerry Muller suggests that the Jewish inclination for philanthropy is partially due to a desire to offset resentment that may be felt by those not as wealthy.

In the 1860s and 1870s, Zionists asked the Rothschilds to buy the land of Palestine for the Jews. James A. de Rothschild paid for construction of the Israeli Knesset building as a gift to the State of Israel and the Supreme Court of Israel building was donated to Israel by Dorothy de Rothschild. The Rothschilds also donated to non-Jewish causes, such as an observatory for Vienna observatory.

== See also ==
- Jewish-American working class
