= Daniel Berger (engraver) =

German engraver (1744–1825)

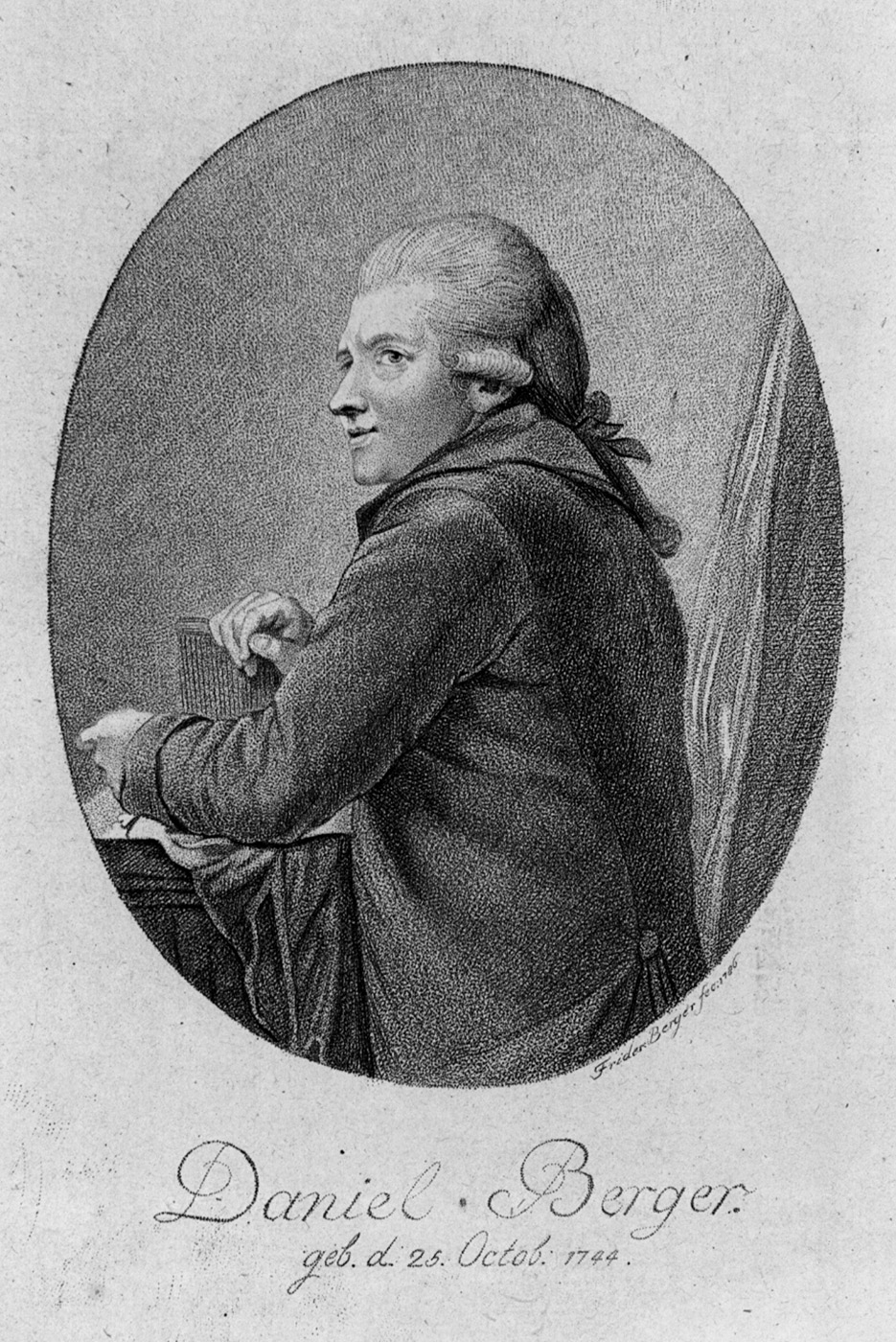
Portrait Daniel Berger by Carl Ludwig von Oesfeld, 1792

Gottfried Daniel Berger (25 October 1744 - 17 November 1825) was a German engraver.

Born in Berlin, Berger was the son of Friedrich Gottlieb Berger, who was also an engraver. In 1757 Berger was being instructed by the French painter Blaise Nicholas Le Sueur, who at the time was the director of the Prussian Academy of Arts. In May 1774, his training was further supplemented by Georg Friedrich Schmidt until the artist's death eight months later. Berger received professional support from Le Sueur, who provided contacts with influential figures including the painter and director of the Sanssouci Picture Gallery Matthias of Austria, the bank director and art connoisseur Carl Philipp Caesar and anatomy professor Johann Friedrich Meckel. In this way, Berger received numerous important commissions, such as the production of illustrations for medical and biological works or reproductions of paintings.

In 1778, Berger was a full member of the Academy of Arts, and in 1787 he was inducted into the rectorship and was appointed professor of engraving. In 1816, Berger became vice director of the academy. He died November 17, 1825, in Berlin.
