= Annapolis Conference =

Middle East peace conference held in the United States

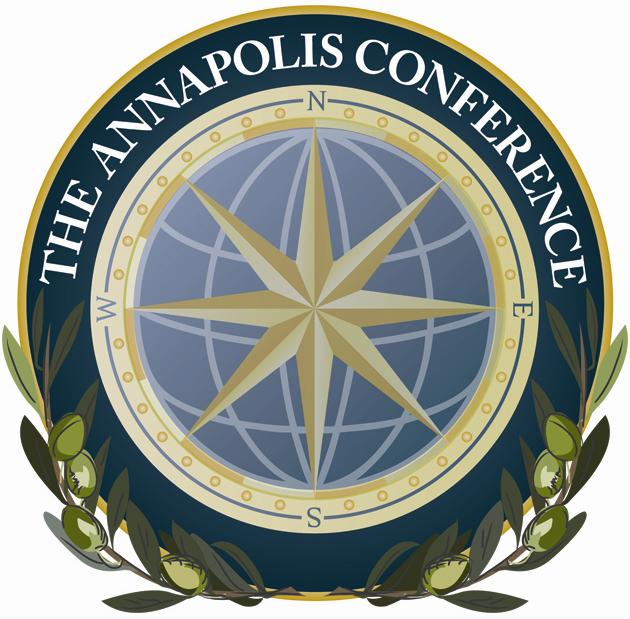
Annapolis Logo

The Annapolis Conference was a Middle East peace conference held on 27 November 2007, at the United States Naval Academy in Annapolis, Maryland, United States. The conference aimed to revive the Israeli–Palestinian peace process and implement the "Roadmap for peace". The conference ended with the issuing of a joint statement from all parties. After the Annapolis Conference, the negotiations were continued. Both Mahmoud Abbas and Ehud Olmert presented each other with competing peace proposals. Ultimately no agreement was reached.

== Attendees ==
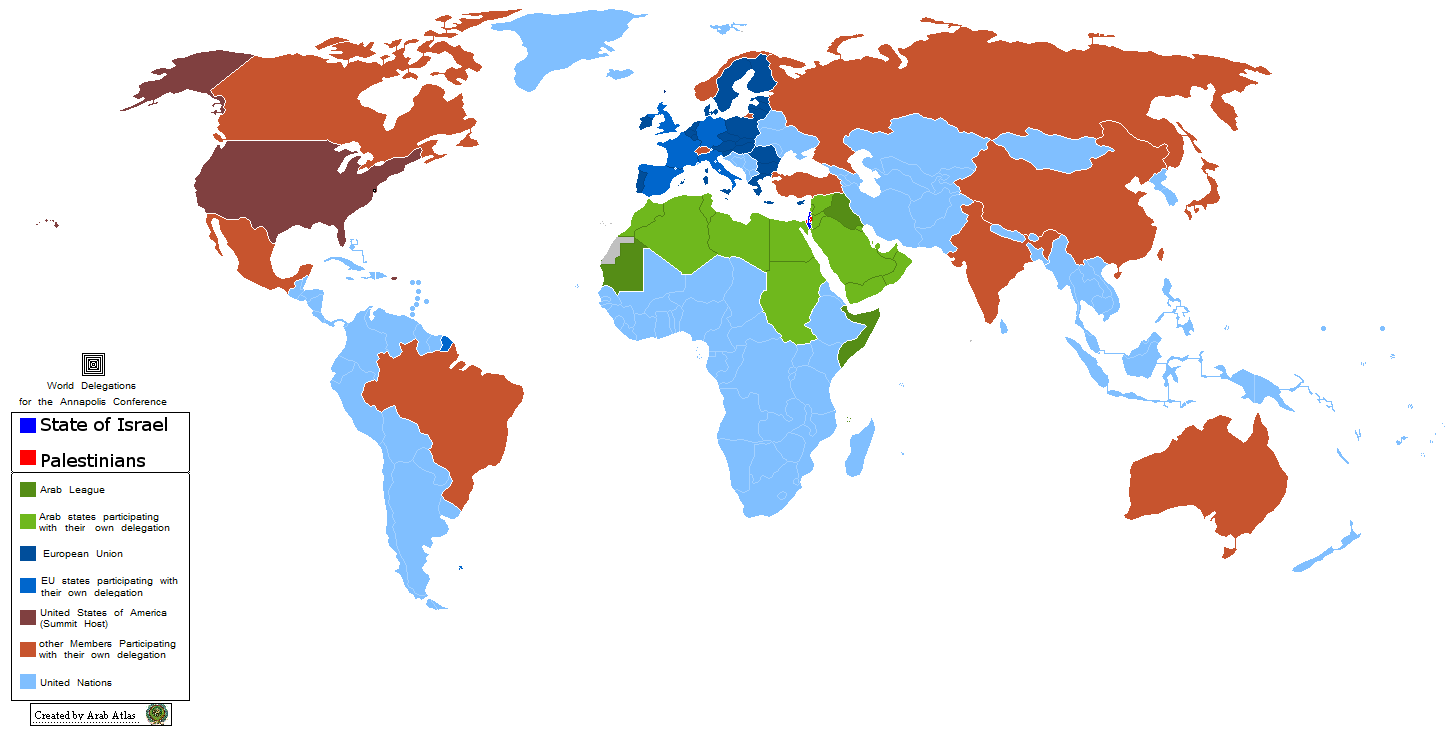
Delegations to the Annapolis Conference, color-coded by affiliation and/or role

The United States organized and hosted the conference. Palestinian President Mahmoud Abbas, Israeli Prime Minister Ehud Olmert, and U.S. President George W. Bush attended the meeting. A partial list of over 40 invitees was released on 20 November 2007, including China, the Arab League, Russia, the European Union and the United Nations; most of whom accepted the invitation.

Israeli Foreign Minister Tzipi Livni headed the Israeli negotiating team, with her diplomatic and legal adviser Tal Becker as lead negotiator and counterpart to Palestinian negotiator Saeb Erekat. Notes regarding Erekat and Becker's talks were later leaked as part of the Palestine Papers.

== Objectives and background ==
The conference aimed to revive the Peace process and gather broad international support. The objective was to restart negotiations on a final status agreement that addresses all core issues, and the establishment of a Palestinian state through the Roadmap for peace. A draft document was leaked by Haaretz before the conference, with the final and forthcoming Annapolis Joint Declaration expected to outline the scope of what will eventually be final peace talks.

== Positions ==
=== Americans ===
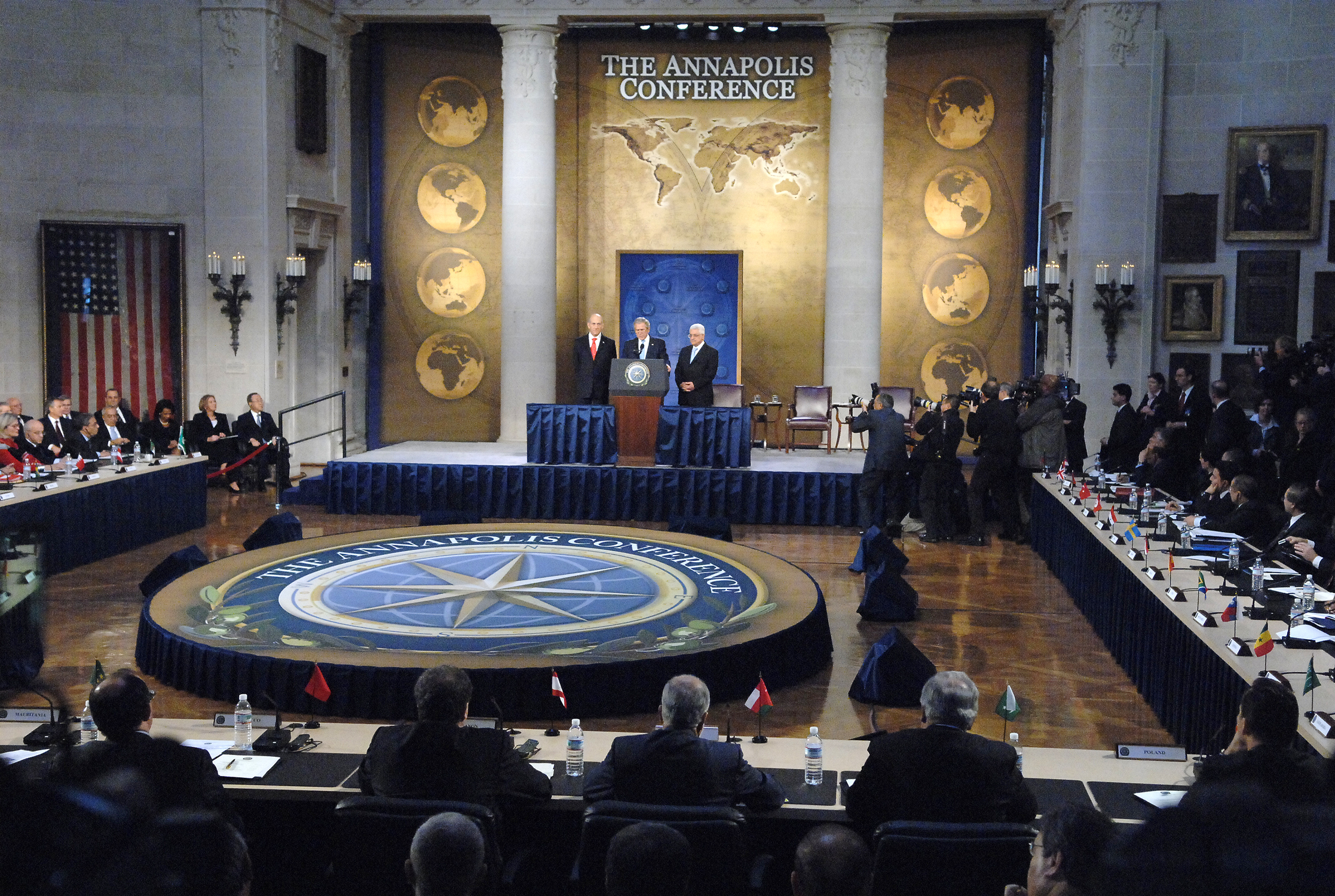
Israeli Prime Minister Ehud Olmert, US President George Bush and Palestinian Authority President Mahmoud Abbas, Annapolis Conference

Secretary of State Condoleezza Rice visited the Middle East on a four-day tour of shuttle diplomacy in mid-October to shore up support for the summit, and hinted at the General Assembly of the United Jewish Communities (GA), in Nashville, Tennessee on 13 November 2007, that Israelis are prepared to give up the West Bank in exchange for peace. This was Rice's 8th visit to the region during the Bush Administration.

=== Palestinian ===
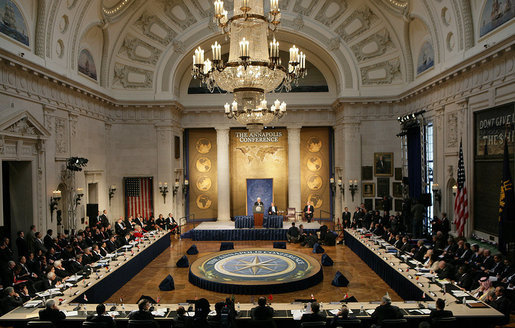
Mahmoud Abbas addresses the Conference

Abbas stated that a clear agenda was necessary for the conference. He demanded a Palestinian state comprising an area equal to the territory of the West Bank and Gaza Strip. He further demanded that all six central issues be debated at the conference: Jerusalem, refugees and right of return, borders, settlements, water and security.

Abbas said that he hoped to reach an agreement with Israel by the end of November 2007, which Abbas would then put to a referendum. Furthermore, he expressed his hope that a final agreement with Israel would be possible within six months of the conference.

=== Israeli ===
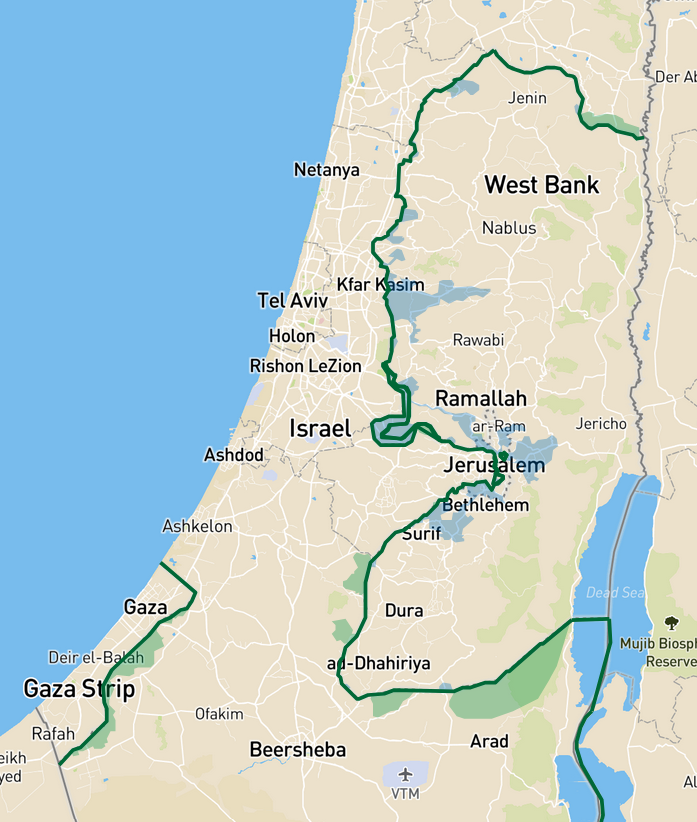
The Israeli proposal of the exchange of territories at the Annapolis conference, according to The Economic Cooperation Foundation think-tank. The territories in blue were to be annexed by Israel and the territories in green were to be annexed to the Palestinian state

In October 2007, Prime Minister Olmert indicated that he would be willing to give up parts of East Jerusalem as part of a broader peace settlement at Annapolis, drawing considerable criticism from right-wing Israeli and foreign Jewish organizations and Christian Zionists.

On 27 November 2007, Ovadia Yosef, the spiritual leader of the Shas party, announced that his party would leave the government coalition, thereby ending the coalition's majority in the Knesset, if Ehud Olmert agreed to divide Jerusalem. Shas minister Eli Yishai explained: "Jerusalem is above all political considerations. I will not help enable concessions on Jerusalem." Olmert's ability to follow through on his earlier comments about concessions in East Jerusalem is therefore in question.

=== Joint statement ===
Prior to the conference, President Bush met with Israeli and Palestinian leaders in the White House. After meeting with Olmert and Abbas, President Bush read from a joint statement, signed by both parties, supporting a two-state solution. "We agreed to immediately launch good faith, bilateral negotiations in order to conclude a peace treaty resolving all outstanding issues, including core issues, without exception", and that "the final peace settlement will establish Palestine as a homeland for the Palestinian people just as Israel is the homeland for the Jewish people."

== Result ==
A joint understanding, read by US president George Bush, stated that "In furtherance of the goal of two states, Israel and Palestine, living side by side in peace and security" the parties agreed to "immediately launch good-faith bilateral negotiations in order to conclude a peace treaty, resolving all outstanding issues, including all core issues without exception, as specified in previous agreements". A steering committee would meet from 12 December 2007, followed by biweekly negotiations between President Abbas and Prime Minister Olmert.

Three tracks were agreed upon by Olmert and Abbas to pursue peace. The first track would be conducted by a Steering Committee which would meet regularly without US oversight to create a framework for peace. Part of Abbas' and Olmert's meetings would be to monitor the progress of this group. The second track was based on the Road map for Peace. The parties also committed to immediately implement their respective obligations under the Road map for peace which they agreed to begin immediately. A monitoring system led by retired US General and former NATO Supreme Allied Commander in Europe, James Jones, would decide when initial steps of the Road map were complete to indicate that both sides should move onto the next step. A third track was set up between Arab states to provide economic backing for the potential Palestinian State. In addition, the Portland Trust (a group that had already invested in the economy in Palestine) agreed to work alongside these Arab countries to continue to foster economic growth.

The parties also committed to immediately implement their respective obligations under the Road map for peace and to continue the implementation of it until they had reached a peace treaty, to be concluded before the end of 2008. Both Abbas and Olmert made their proposals. Abbas refused to sign on Olmert's peace offer as Olmert did not allow Abbas more than one day to study the map. Nevertheless negotiations continued, but got increasingly difficult as Olmert became entangled in domestic corruption charges.

== Negotiations over borders, Jerusalem and refugees ==
President Abbas and Prime Minister Olmert had six meetings since June 2007 to try to agree on some basic issues ahead of the summit. A final round of discussions between Olmert and Abbas was held in Washington, D.C., on 26 November 2007, the day prior to the conference. After the Annapolis Conference, the negotiations were continued.

Accounts on these negotiations differ. Israeli author Bernard Avishai talked to both Olmert and Abbas. Abbas proposed to Olmert a map in which Israel would annex 1.9% of the West Bank (which would contain over 60% of the settlements) in exchange for same size of land inside Israel of equal quality. Olmert countered by proposing to annex 6.3% of the West Bank and giving Palestinians 5.8%. Abbas hoped Americans would propose a compromise number. The Israeli settlement of Ariel, deep inside a potential Palestinian state, was a controversial issue for Olmert and Abbas.

Avishai writes that in Jerusalem both sides agreed the Old City of Jerusalem would be governed by an international body (consisting of Israel, Palestine, United States, Saudi Arabia, Jordan and possibly Egypt and the Vatican). Both sides agreed that Israel would get all Jewish neighbourhoods and Palestine would get almost all Arab neighbourhoods, but Abbas also wanted sovereignty over the Arab neighbourhood of Silwan, which Olmert proposed should instead be governed by the international body. On refugees, Abbas agreed that all of them couldn't return, and that Israel's Jewish majority should be preserved, but considered Olmert's offer of 5,000 as being too low. According to one source, he counter-offered that Israel take 15,000 refugees per year, over 10 years.

Negotiations were formally suspended in January 2009, when Israel invaded the Gaza Strip. But Abbas continued to call on the US to broker a deal.

== Reaction ==
=== Protests and boycotts ===
Hamas and Grand Ayatollah Ali Khamenei of Iran called for a boycott of the conference, and on November 23 Hamas held a demonstration in the Gaza Strip. In the West Bank, large demonstrations opposed to the conference were quelled heavy-handedly, and demonstrators were beaten by Fatah militants. The president of Iran, Mahmoud Ahmadinejad, denounced the event, stating that it was "A political show for the media which is in Israel's interest".

On the other hand, Jewish activists and organizations opposed to Israel's concession in a peace settlement of any part of Jerusalem or the West Bank became increasingly vocal against the Olmert government, with protests in front of Israeli embassies in New York and Washington, D.C., during the summit. On 27 November 2007, Rabbi Dov Lior of the Yesha Rabbis Council called an "emergency meeting" in order to discuss the upcoming conference. During the meeting, Lior stated: "No leader, in any generation, has the right to give away Eretz Israel ... we call on the Jews abroad, and especially on community leaders and rabbis, to join us in our efforts against this treaty and its implications. ... Together, we will save the people of Israel from the government's terrible plan." Lior further stated that peace would only be achieved by "[cleansing] the country of Arabs and [resettling] them in the countries where they came from." A number of large mainstream American Jewish and Christian groups joined with a majority of Knesset to oppose any negotiation that would include altering Jerusalem's status. They formed the Coordinating Council on Jerusalem.

=== Support ===
Organizations that approved of the conference also mobilized and prepared to demonstrate their support for the summit. The United Nations prepared a resolution to be adopted by the Security Council on November 30, 2007, expressing support for the outcome of the conference. The resolution was withdrawn after Israel raised complaints. In addition to Israel's complaints, the Palestinian Authority also said it wasn't interested in a resolution, according to UN sources.

== See also ==
- One-state solution
- Two-state solution
- Three-state solution
