= Jacob Gildor =

Israeli artist

- יעקב גילדור
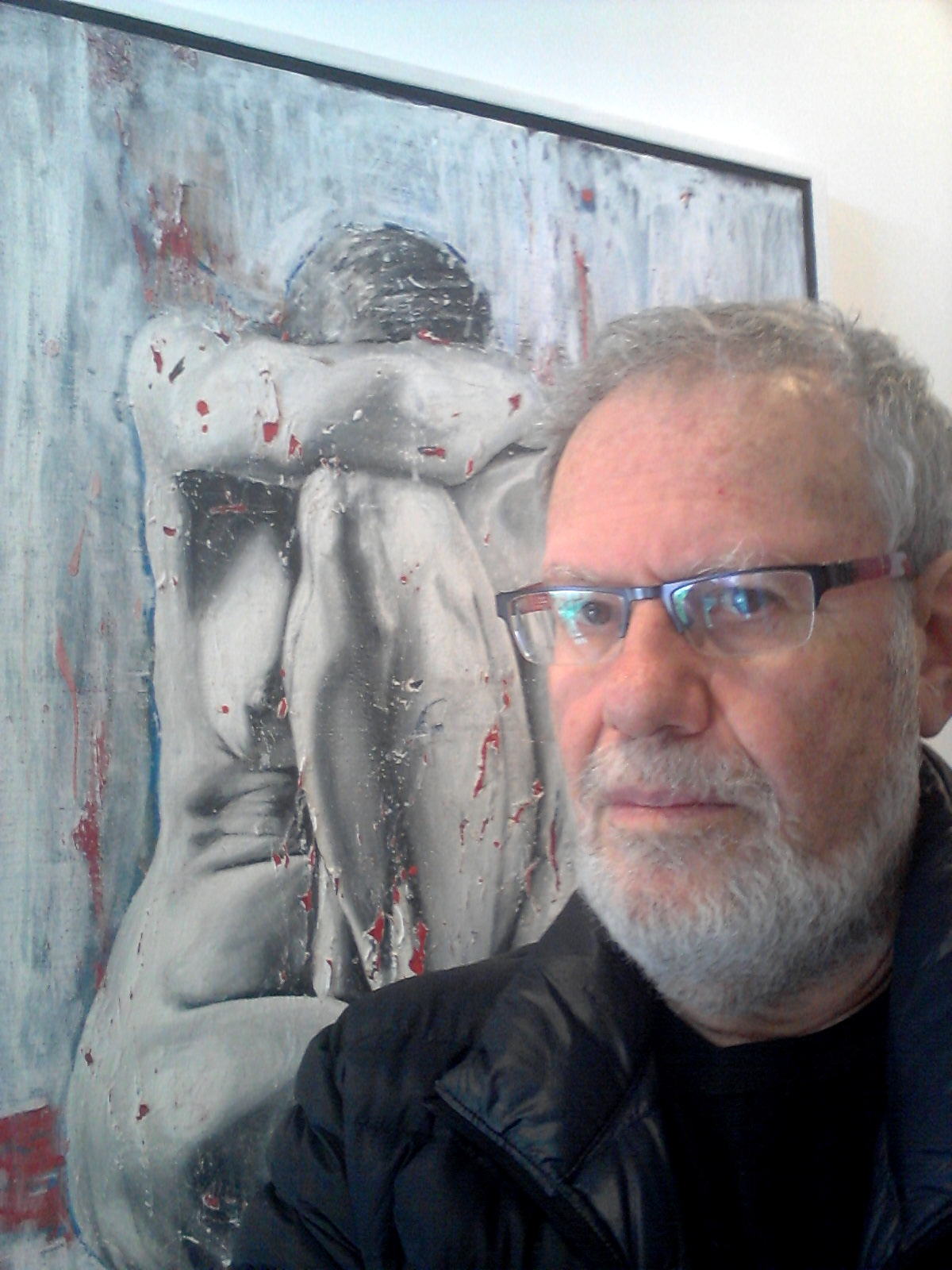
- Gildor in 2014
- Born: Jacob-Yosef Gildengorin; 1948 (age 77–78); Feuchtwangen, Germany
- Other name: Yaakov Gildor

Jacob Gildor (Hebrew: יעקב גילדור; born 1948) is an Israeli artist, representative of the Surrealist movement in Israeli art and of the group of "Second Generation" of Holocaust survivors artists. He is a professional art advisor and consultant at Montefiore Auction House, Tel Aviv and MacDougall's Fine Art Auctions, London.

== Biography ==
In 1987 Gildor spent a year in Cite des Arts in Paris under an Israeli scholarship.

Throughout the years Gildor exhibited in many galleries in Israel, Sweden, Germany and France.

In 2009, a major comprehensive retrospective exhibition, "Segments of Creation", with Gildor's works throughout four decades, was held in the Museum of Israeli Art in Ramat-Gan. The exhibition was displayed for six months and accompanied by a three part complete monography.

== The "Meshushe" Group ==
In 1980, Gildor was one of the founders of Meshushe (Hexagon) group. The group's goal was to introduce Surrealist art to the Israel art space that was dominated by the abstract and conceptual art movements at the time. The founding group consisted of Gildor and five other surrealists: Baruch Elron, Yoav Shuali, Arie Lamdan, Asher Rodnitzky, and Rachel Timor. The group held exhibitions around Israel.

== Second Generation ==
As the son of two Holocaust survivors, Gildor belonged to a group frequently called "The Second Generation".

== Picture gallery ==
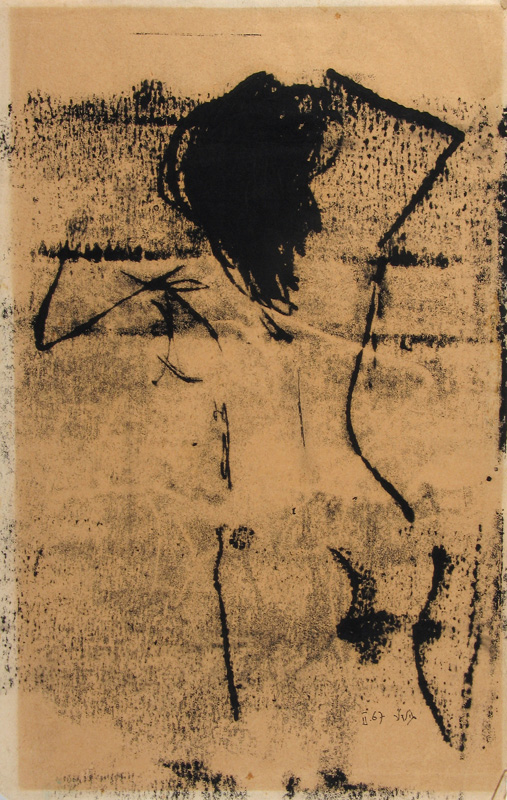
Nude, 1967, monotype, 33x21 cm.

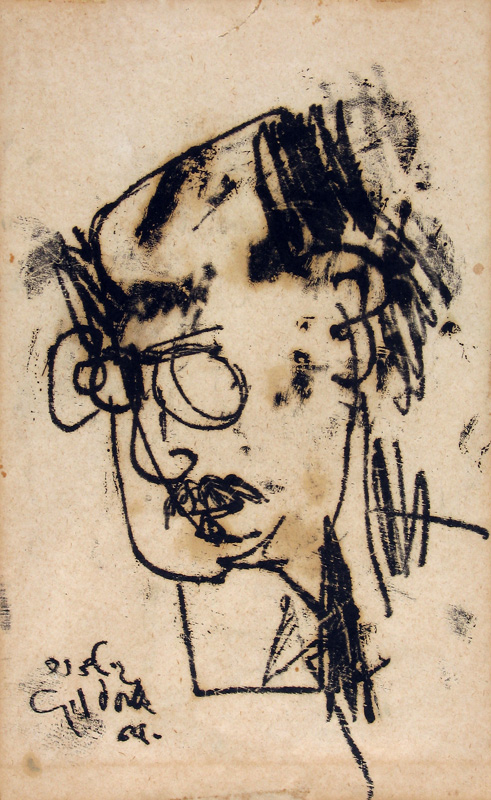
Monocle, 1968, monotype, 33x21cm.

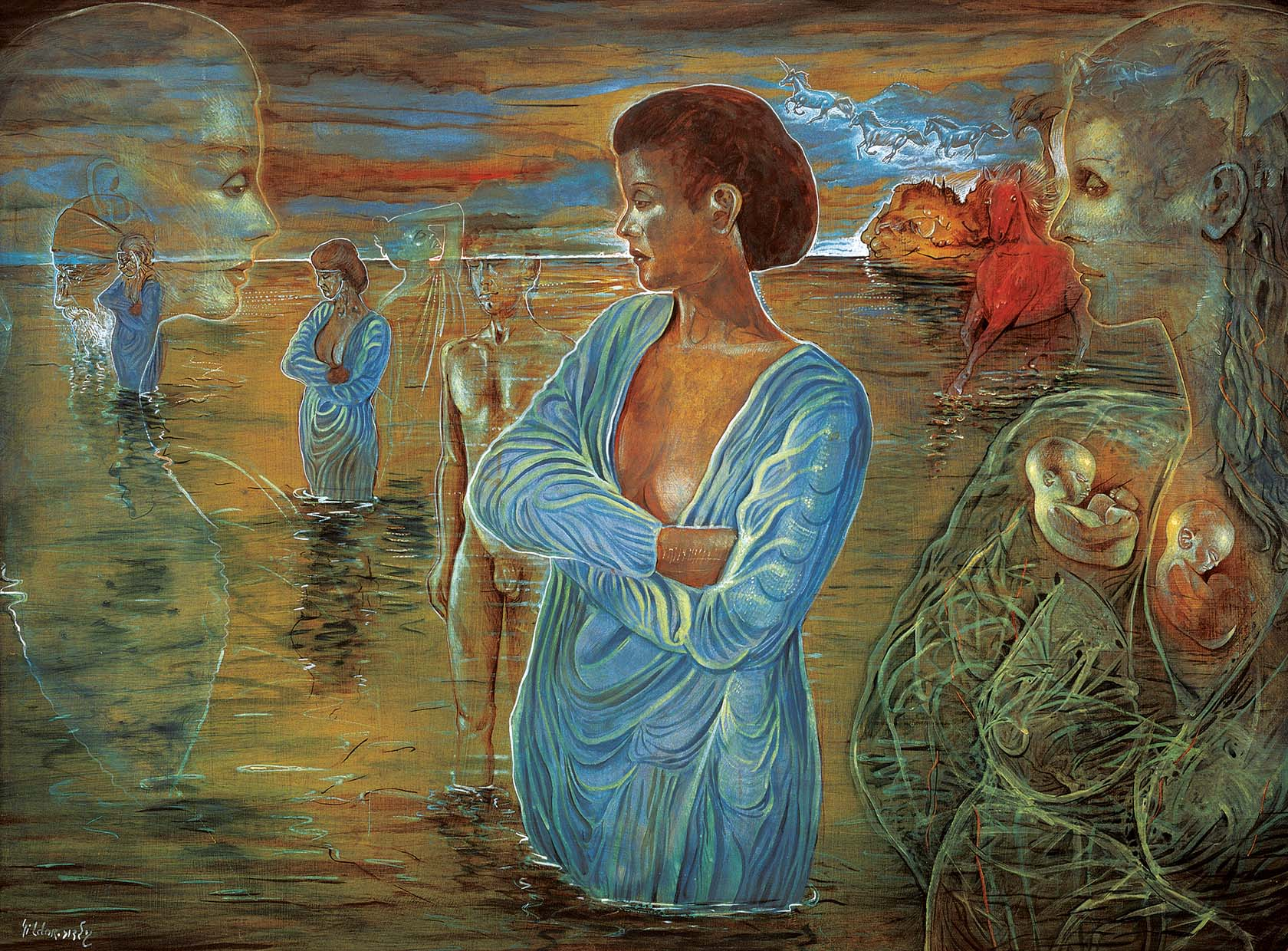
Circle of Life, 1973, oil and tempera on masonite, 75x100cm.

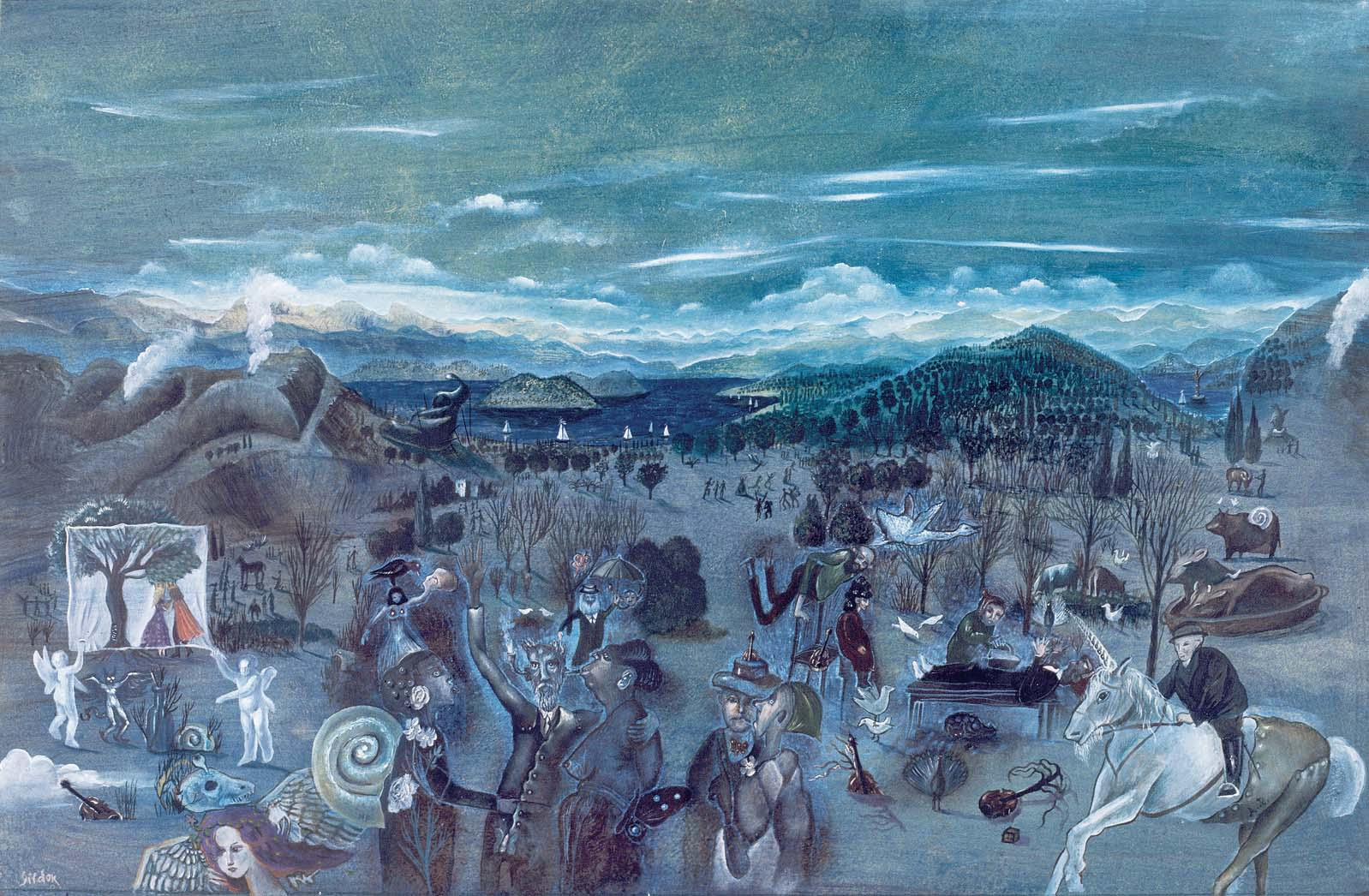
Max and Moritz, 1974, oil and tempera on wood 40x60 cm.

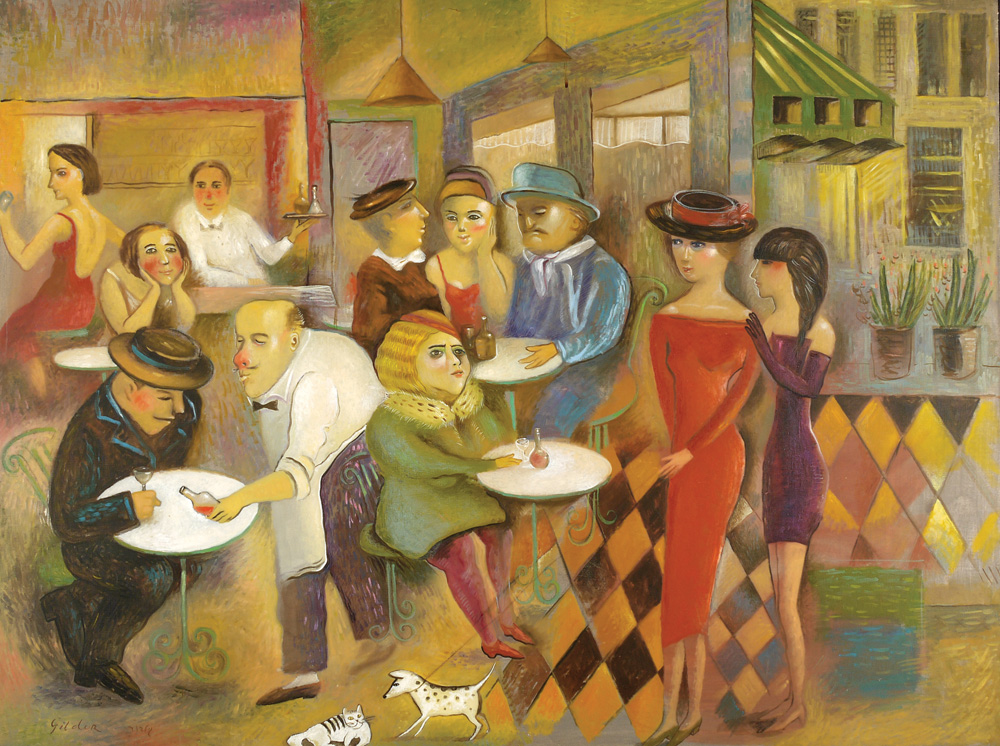
Cafe Naive, 1991, oil on canvas 105x140cm.

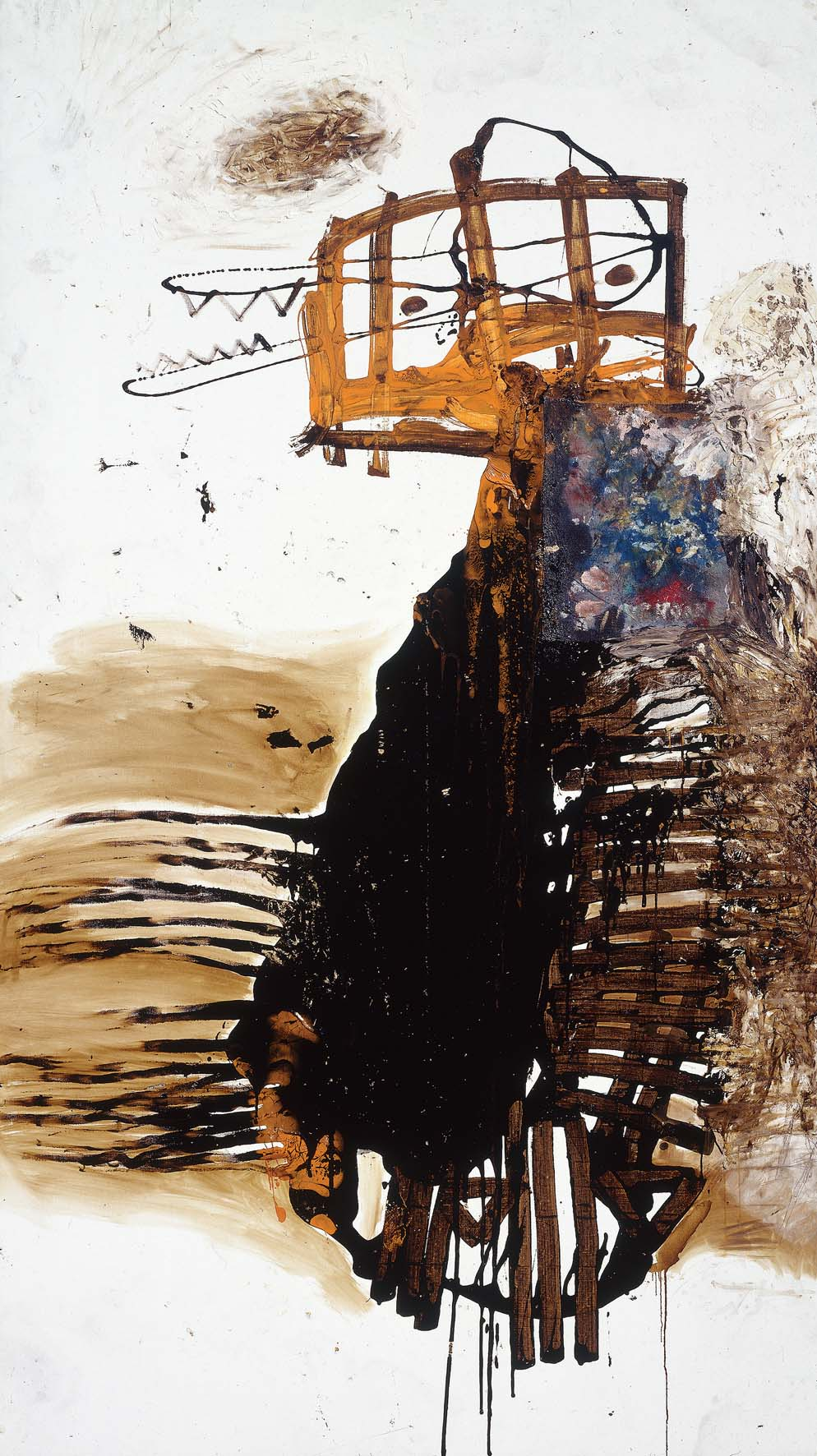
Guard Tower, 1994, oil and asphalt on canvas, 240x140 cm.

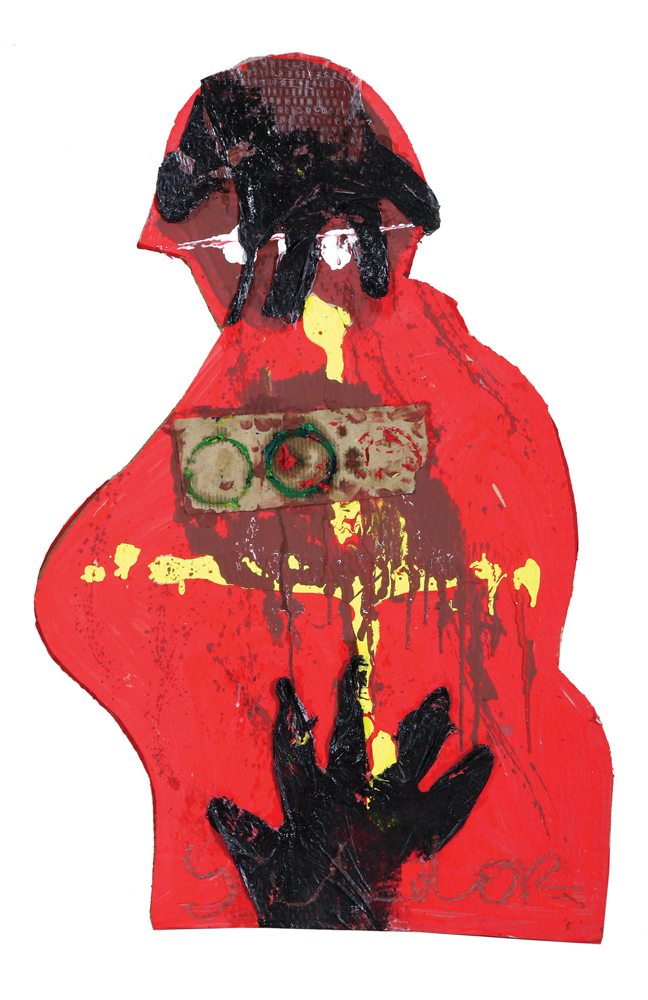
Target, 2011, oil and collage on carton, 76x50cm.

== See also ==
- Mandy Sand
