= Yossi Gross =

Israeli inventor and entrepreneur

Yossi Gross יוסי גרוס
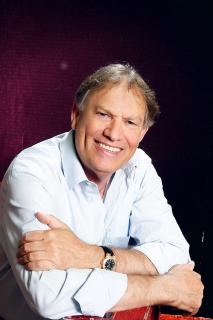
- Yossi Gross
- Born: February 5, 1947 (age 79); Budapest, Hungary
- Occupation: Entrepreneur
- Children: Amir Gross, CEO, Valtech; Inbal Gross, Interior design
- Website: Rainbow Medical web site

Yossi Gross (Hebrew: יוסי גרוס; born February 5, 1947) is an Israeli inventor and entrepreneur. He is a founding partner of Rainbow Medical, an operational investment company, established to launch companies based on the technological ideas and inventions of Gross. Yossi Gross is the founder of multiple medical device companies based on his various inventions in active implantables, neurostimulation, signal processing, nanotechnology, and drug delivery. Gross's various companies have developed or are currently developing treatments for diabetes, gastroenterology, stroke, ophthalmology, asthma, congestive heart failure, and urology. Gross has over 800 filed patents. Companies based on his inventions collectively garnered over $1B dollars in acquisitions.

== Biography ==
Yossi Gross was born in Budapest, Hungary. He immigrated to Israel, with his Holocaust-survivor parents, at the age of three. His parents and family live in Moshav Mazor. Gross received an MSc degree in 1976 in aeronautical engineering from the Technion Israel Institute of Technology in Haifa, Israel.

== Engineering, inventing, and business career ==
Following his graduation from the Technion in 1976, Gross joined Israel AirCraft Industries where he began to work as a flight test engineer from 1977 to 1985. Gross was on the management team of the IAI Lavi project, a program tasked to design and build a fighter jet, similar to the F-16, for the Israeli Air Force. The program was later cancelled.

In 1985, Gross opened General Ideas and Products Ltd., where he developed several small electric consumer appliances. From 1988 to 1995, Gross also directed the R&D operations of Scientific Innovations.

Gross's first medical creation was a small mini-pump to deliver drugs which he developed in an equally owned joint venture with Elan Corporation called Elan Medical Technologies, a subsidiary of Elan Pharmaceuticals. Gross spent most of the 1990s working at Elan developing drug delivery systems, the patents of which are assigned to Elan. In 1998, Elan bought Gross out. He stayed on for a short while as the vice president of research and development, before leaving to begin building his own business.

=== Companies ===
From the late 1990s to date, Gross launched over 36 separate medical device companies, all based on his patents and inventions. Examples of these companies are listed below by indication.

Neurostimulation

- Bluewind Medical, tibial nerve stimulation for overactive bladder
- DisCure, degenerative disc treatment
- Brainsgate, acute stroke treatment
- Enopace, diastolic heart failure treatment
- BioControl Medical, systolic heart failure system

Cardiovascular

- Valtech Cardio, minimally invasive mitral valve repair technology, acquired by Edwards Life Science
- Cardiovalve, mitral valve replacement, acquired by Venus Medtech

Diabetes

- Beta-02 Technologies, treatment for insulin-dependent diabetes,
- BetaStim, new neurostimulation treatment for diabetes,

Drug Delivery

- TransPharma Medical, active transdermal drug delivery system,
- E-Pill, oral delivery of large molecule drugs,

Gastroenterology

- GI View, devices for diagnosing and treating gastrointestinal disorders,
- DuoCure, Obesity therapy,

Ophthalmology

- VisionCare Ophthalmic Technologies Inc., miniature telescope for age-related macular degeneration (AMD)
- Ophthocare, electronic eyeglasses for lazy eye in children
- Nano Retina, Retina implant

Remote Patient Supervision

- EarlySense, contact-free, continuous, patient supervision system for hospital and home use

BioMetrics

- IDesia Biometrics, authentication technology solution based on electro physiological signals

== Rainbow Medical ==
Rainbow Medical, based in Herzliya Pituach, Israel, was launched in 2007 with funding from GlenRock Israel, NGN Capital, SVM Asset Management and individuals. Rainbow Medical has aspects of a venture fund and a US-style incubator. Rainbow mainly supports the technology ideas of Yossi Gross. Rainbow Medical finances its start-up companies at their beginnings. Subsequent investment is done on an individual company basis through both outside investors and select Rainbow investors.

== Memberships ==
Gross is a member of the Israeli Life Science Association.
