= Shauna Devine =

Canadian medical historian

Shauna Devine is a medical historian with the Western University in London, Canada and a swimming coach for Torch Swimming in Toronto. Her first book, Learning from the Wounded: The Civil War and the Rise of American Medical Science (2014) won the 2015 Tom Watson Brown Book Award of the Society of Civil War Historians and Watson-Brown Foundation, the 2015 Wiley-Silver Prize of the Center for Civil War Research at the University of Mississippi, and was named an Outstanding Academic Title of 2015 by Choice. She has been a swimming coach for Team Canada in the 2000 Sydney Summer Olympics.

She is a board member of the National Museum of Civil War Medicine.

== Selected publications ==
=== Books ===
- Learning from the Wounded: The Civil War and the Rise of American Medical Science. The University of North Carolina Press, Chapel Hill, 2014.
