= Carl Ludwig von Oesfeld =

German cartographer (1741–1804)

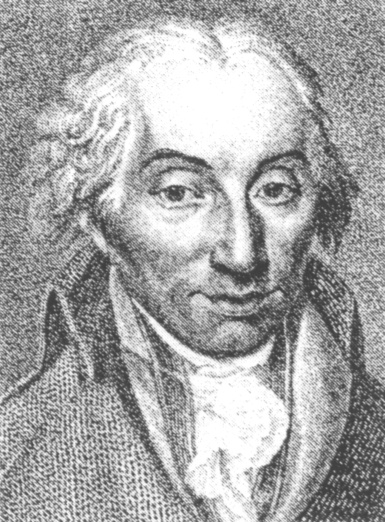
Carl Ludwig von Oesfeld, taken from the Brandenburg Biographical Dictionary

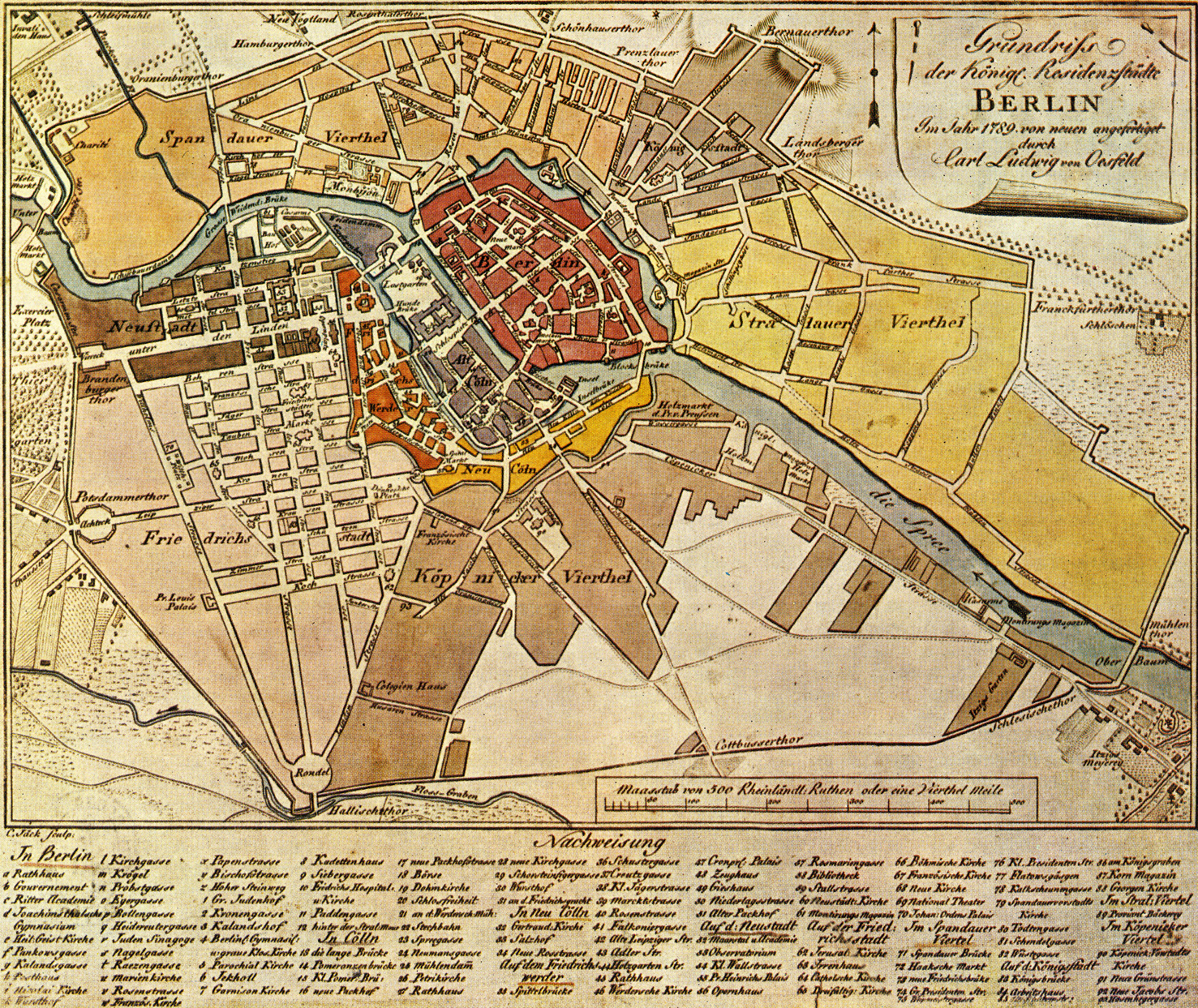
Map of seat of royal power Berlin from 1789 by Carl Ludwig von Oesfeld, colored copper engraving, 1789

Carl Ludwig von Oesfeld (4 March 1741 – 4 November 1804) was a Prussian Privy Councillor and a German cartographer.

Oesfeld's father Johann Friedrich Oesfeld was a preacher in Berlin and Potsdam, and his brother Frederick William was a lawyer in Frankfurt. Carl Ludwig Oesfeld himself practiced the profession of a country cartographer, topographer, military writer and illustrator in the engineer corps. He trained the cartographer Daniel Friedrich Sotzmann in 1772. In 1786 he was knighted along with his brother, and in 1788 then appointed Privy Councillor. Oesfeld also collected maps and prints. His son Karl Wilhelm von Oesfeld also worked as a cartographer and topographer.
