= Mercedes Graf =

American psychologist and historian

Mercedes Herrera Graf was born in Chicago, Illinois, USA. She is a former professor of psychology, an American military historian, and a historian of medicine. She previously taught at the Illinois School of Professional Psychology where she was also the director of clinical school psychology and the Child & Adolescent Clinic; professor and director of school psychology Governors State University, University Park, Illinois.

Graf is now an independent scholar, who resides in Highland Park, Illinois. Her book On the Field of Mercy provided the first comprehensive overview of the role of women medical volunteers in early American wars.

== Education ==
She holds a doctorate from the University of Illinois Urbana-Champaign. She received her master's degree from Chicago State University and her undergraduate degree from Loyola University of Chicago.

== Book reviews ==
- On the Field of Mercy : Women Medical Volunteers from the Civil War to the First World War, Reviewed by Judy Dalgo, Journal of the History of Medicine and Allied Sciences, Vol. 68, No. 2, [April 2013].
- On the Field of Mercy, reviewed by Teresa M. O'Neill (professor, Our Lady of Holy Cross College, New Orleans, LA.) in AAHN, Vol. 21, 2013.
- Women Doctors in War : reviewed by Robert S. Driscoll, Journal of Military History; Oct2010, Vol. 74 Issue 4, p 1289. Reviewed by Kara Dixon Vuic, The American Historical Review, Volume 115 (4) – Oct 1, 2010.

== Bibliography ==
=== Books ===
- Graf, Mercedes (2013). To Heal and to Serve: Women Army Doctors in World War Two. Hellgate Press. ISBN 978-1-555-71744-5. OCLC 857524754.
- On the Field of Mercy: Women Medical Volunteers from the Civil War to the First World War. Amherst. NY: Humanity Books. 2010. ISBN 978-1-591-02327-2. OCLC 60323457.
- Women Doctors in War. College Station: Texas A & M University Press. 2009. ISBN 978-1-60344-146-9.
- A Woman of Honor: Dr. Mary E. Walker and the Civil War. Gettysburg, PA: Thomas Publications. 2001. ISBN 1-577-47071-0. OCLC 48851708.
- Quarantine. Vantage Press. 2001. ISBN 053312512X. biographical fiction on Typhoid Mary
- She wrote the Introduction to "HIT: Essays on Women's Rights" by Mary E. Walker, M.D., Classics in Women's Studies, Humanity Press, 2003, ISBN 1-59102-098-0
