= Marissa Roth =

American photojournalist

- Born: 1957 (age 67–68)
- Occupation: Photojournalist
- Awards: Pulitzer Prize for Spot News

Marissa Roth (born 1957) is a photojournalist who was part of the Los Angeles Times team that won a Pulitzer Prize for Spot News for their coverage of the 1992 Los Angeles riots. She is the subject of a one-woman show, Finding the Light written and performed by Lisa Hayes.

In addition to the Los Angeles Times, Roth has worked for Newsweek, The New York Times, and Entertainment Weekly. She is a graduate of the University of California, Los Angeles and a Fellow of the Royal Geographical Society.

== Photography ==
The child of Holocaust survivors, much of Roth's work has focused on those affected by violence.

Her project Witness to Truth was commissioned by The Museum of Tolerance/Simon Wiesenthal Center in Los Angeles; it features her photos of 95 Holocaust survivors who volunteered at the center and is a permanent exhibit there.

Her 2012 exhibit One Person Crying features photos from 28 years of Roth's report, specifically showing wars' effects on women around the world, including Bosnia, Cambodia, Ireland, Poland, and Vietnam. One Person Crying inspired playwright and actor Lisa Hayes to develop her one-woman show, Finding the Light, which includes images from the exhibit and addresses women's struggles for survival in times of conflict. The show premiered at the 2014 meeting of the European Association for American Studies in the Hague.

In 2016, Roth curated an exhibit of wartime photos by Vietnam War veterans entitled My War: Wartime Photographs by Vietnam Veterans.

== Exhibitions ==
- One Person Crying: Women and War, 2012
- In Hollywood, 2009
- An Evening with Marissa Roth, 2008;
- Witness to Truth: Portraits of Holocaust Survivors, 2005
- Caught in the Crossfire: Women and War, 2001
- Inside/Out: Downtown Los Angeles, 2000
- Burning Heart: A Portrait of the Philippines, 1999.

== Books ==
=== As photographer ===
- Infinite Light, 2014
- Come the Morning, 2005
- Real city : downtown Los Angeles inside/out, 2001
- Burning Heart: a Portrait of the Philippines, 1999

=== As editor ===
- My War : Wartime Photographs by Vietnam Veterans
