= Martha Settle Putney =

American historian

- Born: November 9, 1916; Norristown, Pennsylvania, U.S.
- Died: December 11, 2008 (aged 92); Washington, D.C., U.S.
- Occupations: Educator; historian
- Spouse(s): William M. Putney (1948–1965; his death); 1 child

Martha Settle Putney (November 9, 1916 – December 11, 2008) was an American educator and historian who chronicled the roles of African Americans in the armed forces. After serving as one of the first black members of the Women's Army Corps during World War II, she devoted her life to researching and documenting the military service and achievements of black Americans.

Following a period of employment with the War Manpower Commission after her discharge from the army, she entered the academic world, earning a PhD at the University of Pennsylvania and pursuing a distinguished teaching career at Bowie State College (now Bowie State University) in Maryland, where she chaired the history and geography department, and later at Howard University, her alma mater, in Washington, D.C. Upon retiring from the faculty at Howard, she embarked on a writing career that included three books and over 20 journal articles. At the time of her death at age 92 she was working on a fourth book portraying the contributions of blacks in combat dating back to the American Revolutionary War.

== Early life ==
Martha Settle was born to Oliver and Ida Settle of Norristown, Pennsylvania, on November 9, 1916. Her father worked as a laborer to support his wife and eight children.

As a young woman, she helped garner black votes for a candidate for Congress whom she had heard speak. The candidate won, and with his help she got a scholarship to Howard University, where she received a bachelor's degree (1939) and master's degree in history (1940).

She remained in Washington where, despite her academic credentials, she was unable to get a teaching job. She settled instead for a statistical clerk position with the War Manpower Commission. In 1943 she enlisted in the Women's Army Corps, which had been created the previous year. Interviewed years later, she explained her decision this way: "The Corps, which was then less than a year old, promised an opportunity to become a commissioned officer. Though I had a master's degree in history, I refused to go any further south for a job, so the promise of a commission was the best option available."

== Women's Army Corps ==
Martha Settle was one of 40 African-American women selected for the Women's Army Corps (WAC) in 1943. Initially commissioned as commanding officer, she soon earned the rank of third officer—similar to a second lieutenant in the WAC—and was assigned to a basic training company at Fort Des Moines, Iowa. She was also one of the five black WACs in the 35th Officer Candidate School class. Her duties there included leading drills and teaching calisthenics. She asked for, and was granted, permission to attend Adjutant General's School in San Antonio to train for an executive or administrative position. This led to an assignment as commanding officer of a WAC Hospital Company at the Gardiner General Hospital in Chicago, a position she held for the rest of the war.

Many years later, when asked in a television interview by CNN correspondent Paula Zahn what "the whole world [should] understand about women's efforts" in World War II, Dr. Putney replied: "They should understand . . . that we were a mighty support force for the male armed forces. I've got to say male because many of us did all of the tasks, all of the . . . military occupational specialties, as a man, except carry a gun." Interviewed on another occasion, she said: "It is my thesis that military integration made the basis for the emergence and the expansion of the black middle class." Prior to the desegregation of the U.S. Army in 1948, African Americans in bases such as Fort Des Moines faced discriminatory policies such as restrictions to facilities. For instance, the base swimming pool was only accessible to black personnel on Fridays and promptly cleaned afterwards. Putney recalled calling on the women of her unit to swim on regular pool days, an action that broke the tension, leaving it more relaxed and free. Another incident of racial hostility Putney faced during this period was from a white bunkmate who had just arrived at training. According to an oral history interview with the Library of Congress, she recollects the event of the bunkmate verbally confronting her with racial slurs in front of others in the barracks since she objected to sharing a barracks with a black soldier. Putney remained silent at this, and eventually, the bunkmate apologized and later they developed an amiable relationship.

== Family ==
After the war, she returned to her job with the Manpower Commission, where she met William M. Putney. William served as an officer for the United States Army during WWII. They married in 1948 and had a son, William M. Putney Jr., the following year. Her husband died in 1965 in Washington, D.C., at the age of 58.

== Academic career ==
Making use of the G.I. Bill, she enrolled in the doctoral program at the University of Pennsylvania and in 1955 received her PhD in European History. After brief stints at Morgan State University and Prairie View A&M University, she joined Bowie State College's history and geography department, which she chaired until 1974. She then returned to her alma mater, Howard University, where she held the position of Senior Lecturer until 1983.

Interviewed by Tom Brokaw for his book The Greatest Generation, Howard professor Dr. Clifford Muse, Jr., described Dr. Putney's approach to teaching: "She worked me to death. I really learned from her. She tried to prepare you for discrimination in the sense you had to be very good to be accepted." Most of the students at both Howard and Bowie State were black, and former student William Missouri noted that Dr. Putney would ask unprepared students, "How can you be an African American and not want to learn African-American history?"

== Writings ==
After retiring from her teaching career, Dr. Putney turned to writing, focusing on the achievement of African Americans in the military. Her first book, Black Sailors: Afro-American Merchant Seamen and Whalemen Prior to the Civil War, published in 1987 by Greenwood Press, was described by one reviewer as "A welcome contribution to what amounts to a new field of study, black history and the American maritime service."

Her second book, When the Nation was in Need: Blacks in the Women's Army Corps During World War II (Scarecrow Press, 1992), drew not only on the author's personal experience in the army but also from "archival records, manuscripts, documents, contemporary newspaper accounts and interviews, statements, and the personal files of those who served". It received the 1993 Outstanding Book on Human Rights award of the Gustav Myers Center for the Study of Human Rights in America.

Dr. Putney was the editor of Blacks in the United States Army: Portraits Through History (McFarland, 2003), a pictorial collection whose paintings and sketches "depict black army personnel at war, as war casualties, at prayer, in peacetime assignments, in training, at play and at leisure, and as military musicians." Each illustration is accompanied by a narrative along with the artist's name, medium used, location of the original, and other information.

Dr. Putney published numerous articles in scholarly journals including the Maryland Historical Magazine, Journal of Negro History, Negro History Bulletin, and the Journal of the Afro-American Historical and Genealogical Society.

She also was a frequent contributor to the Northeast News, a community newspaper.

== Awards ==
- 1970: Outstanding Book Award from Gustavus Myers Center
- 1999: Recipient of the Elanor Roosevelt Val-Kill Medal, honoring those who contribute to society in ways that reflect Roosevelt's ideals.

== Other contributions ==
Dr. Putney's chronicling of the military exploits of African Americans was not confined to the written word. She also conveyed these histories through the medium of public speaking. On July 17, 1998, for example, she spoke at a National Park Service ceremony at Ford's Theater in Washington, D.C., occasioned by the inception earlier that year of the Civil War Soldiers and Sailors System. She began her remarks with a reference to the fatal attack on Fort Wagner, South Carolina, by the 54th Massachusetts Volunteer Infantry Regiment, noting that "numerous accounts and the film 'Glory' have pretty much brought this event to the attention of the general public." She then pointed out that this assault "was one of the many battlefield exploits of African Americans during the Civil War. Before the war ended, black troops had been involved in hundreds of skirmishes and engagements including thirty-five major battles." Dr. Putney went on to cite statistics regarding the blacks who served the Union on land and sea: of their 200,000 number, there were "some 68,000 casualties; some 37,000 of these lost their lives."

Dr. Putney was a member of the NAACP and the Association for the Study of Negro Life and History (now the Association for the Study of African American Life and History). She volunteered at the Smithsonian Institution and was on the editorial board of the Journal of the Afro-American Historical and Genealogical Society where she was also a member of the editorial board from 1983 to 1992.

== Death ==
Dr. Martha Settle Putney died on December 11, 2008, at the Community Hospice of Washington in the District of Columbia. The cause of death was chronic obstructive pulmonary disease. On February 10, 2009, she was buried at Arlington National Cemetery.

== Bibliography ==
Books

- (1987) Black Sailors: Afro-American Merchant Seamen and Whalemen Prior to the Civil War
- (1992) When the Nation was in Need: Blacks in the Women's Army Corps During World War II
- (2003) Blacks in the United States Army: Portraits Through History (editor)

Journal Articles (partial list)

- (1972) "Black Merchant Seamen of Newport, 1803–1865: A Case Study in Foreign Commerce," Journal of Negro History 57
- (1975) "The Formative Years of Maryland's First Black Postsecondary School," Maryland Historical Magazine (June 1975)
- (1975) "The Slave Trade in French Diplomacy from 1814 to 1815," Journal of Negro History 60 (July 1975)
- (1976) "Nelson Wells and His Legacy," Negro History Bulletin 39: 642–647
- (1977) "The Baltimore Normal School for the Education of Colored Teachers: Its Founders and Its Founding". Maryland Historical Magazine 72, no.2 (Summer 1977)
- (1980) "The Black Colleges in the Maryland State College System: Quest for Equal Opportunity, 1908–1975," Maryland Historical Magazine, 75:4: 335–343
- (1981) "The Baltimore Normal School Cash Book: the Funding and Management of a Black Mission School, the Predecessor of Bowie State College," Journal of Afro-American Historical and Genealogical Society 2:2: 65–74
- (1983) "Pardon Cook: Whaling Master," Journal of the Afro-American Historical Society, 40:47–54
- (1991) "Mary McLeod Bethune and the Women's Army Corps during World War II," Afro-American Historical and Genealogical Society, Inc., Volume 12, Numbers 1 & 2; Special IsInc., Index to Back Issues] (cited hereafter as AAHGS), accessed March 4, 2009.
- (1991) "Blacks in the Women's Army Corps: The Experiences of Two Companies," Afro-American Historical and Genealogical Society, Inc., Volume 12, Numbers 1 & 2; Special Issue: African Americans in the Military
- (1991) "An Interview with Ralph David Abernathy," Afro-American Historical and Genealogical Society, Inc., Volume 12, Numbers 3 & 4 (edited by Martha S. Putney)
- (1996) "The Travails of Ernestine Woods: First Black Graduate from Officer Candidate School, The Women's Army Corps, Fort Oglethorpe, Georgia, during World War II," Afro-American Historical and Genealogical Society, Inc., Volume 15, Number 2

Other

- (1992) "Some Experiences In The Women's Army Corps During World War II," in Proceedings Of] – Remarks of Hon. Alcee L. Hastings, p. 5, February 13, 2009, accessed February 26, 2009.
