= Pamela D. Toler =

American historian

- Occupation: historian
- Writing career
- Subjects: Military history, women's history, South Asian history
- Website: pameladtoler.com

Pamela D. Toler is an American historian, who specializes in military history and women's history.

== Biography ==
Toler has a PhD in South Asian history from the University of Chicago.

Toler has written for Aramco World, Calliope, History Channel Magazine, MHQ: The Quarterly Journal of Military History, and on Time.com.

Toler lives in Chicago.

== Works ==
- The Dragon from Chicago: The Untold Story of an American Reporter in Nazi Germany. US: Beacon Press, 2024. ISBN 9780807063125
- Women Warriors: An Unexpected History. Beacon Press, 2019. ISBN 978-080706432-0
- Heroines of Mercy Street. New York: Back Bay Books, Little Brown and Company 2017. ISBN 0316392065 OCLC 949143435
- Mankind: The Story of All of Us. Philadelphia, PA: Running Press Book Publishers, 2012. ISBN 9780762447039
- The Everything Guide to Understanding Socialism. Avon, MA: Adams Media, 2011. ISBN 9781440512773
