= Daniel Berger (physician) =

American physician (born 1957)

Daniel Berger (born November 25, 1957) is a leading HIV specialist in the United States. A clinical associate professor at the Chicago campus of the University of Illinois College of Medicine, Berger is also founder and medical director of Northstar Medical Center, Chicago's largest private HIV/AIDS research and treatment center.

Berger has received numerous awards for his work as a researcher and teacher, including the Charles E. Clifton Leadership Award "For excellence and leadership to the Chicago HIV community" (2006), the Distinguished Researcher in HIV Medicine Award from Serono Laboratories (2000) and the American College of Physicians’ Preceptor Award for outstanding teaching in internal medicine (1996).

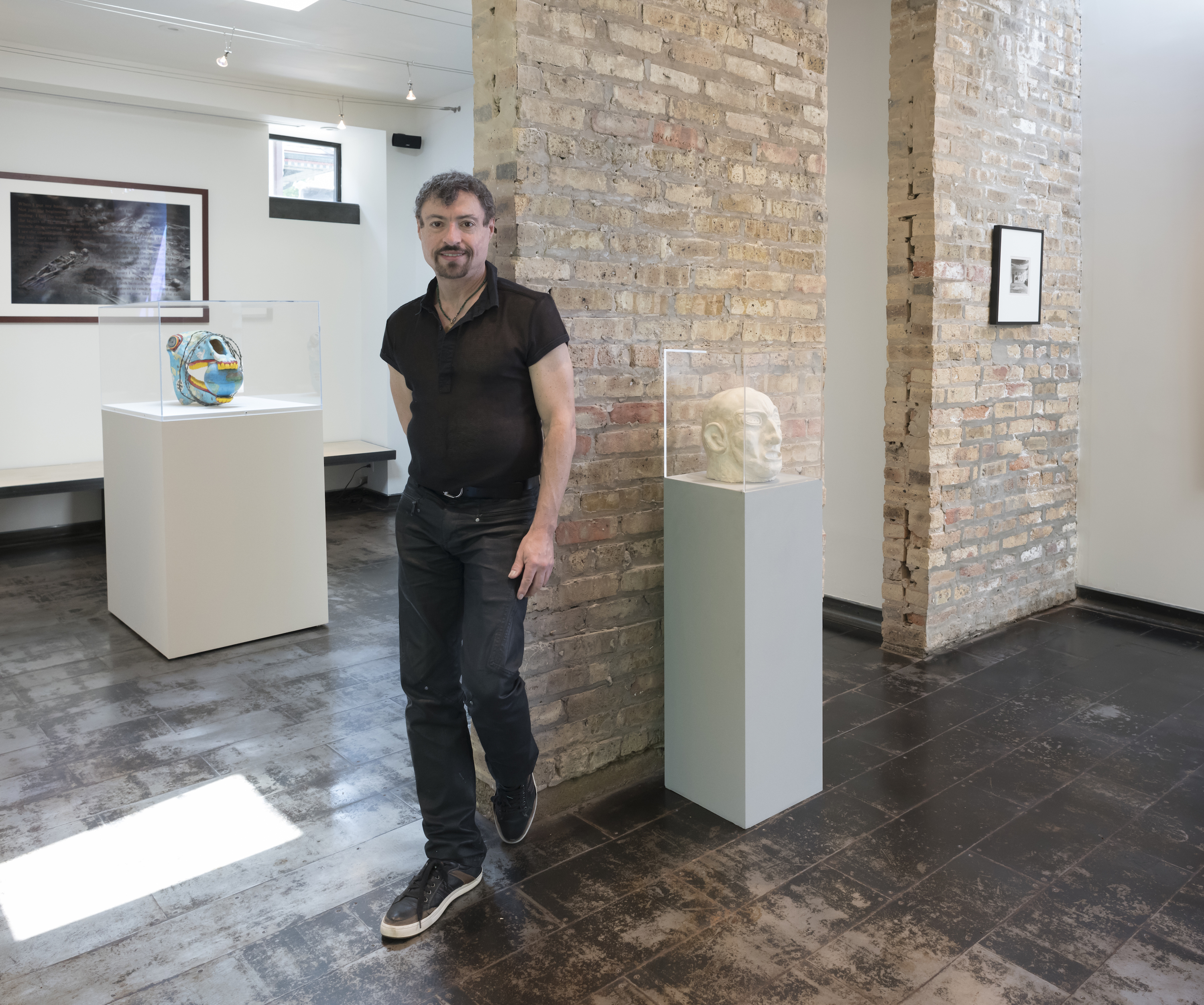
Dr. Daniel Berger at Iceberg Projects, Chicago.

In 2021, Berger was recipient of the Visual AIDS Vanguard Award for his "exceptional work as an HIV specialist who has made essential contributions to HIV and AIDS medical treatments, as well as his passion for art and the legacy of art AIDS activism as a collector, curator, archivist, and philanthropist."

== Biography ==
Born in Brooklyn, New York, Daniel Berger is the son of Hungarian immigrants Kathy and Kalman Berger and brother to Kenneth Ira Berger. Kathy Berger (1926-2016) was a survivor of Nazi Concentration camp Auschwitz, liberated from Bergen-Belsen at the end of WW II. Her biography and testimony has been recorded and documented in the Shoah Foundation archives. Kalman Berger (1921 - 1984) was a survivor of Nazi slave labor in Hungary, Poland, Germany, and Russia. Berger's brother Kenneth Ira Berger is a Professor (Departments of Medicine and Neuroscience / Physiology) and Medical Director at the Tisch Pulmonary Function Lab at NYU. Has conducted extensive research and has more than 50 publications in the areas of pulmonary physiology, cardiovascular and pulmonary outcomes of World Trade Center exposure, mucopolysaccharidosis, Pompe's Disease and pulmonary manifestations of obesity.

Berger received his B.S. from Touro College in New York City and his M.D. from Rosalind Franklin University of Medicine and Science (The Chicago Medical School North Chicago). He interned at Lutheran General Hospital of Park Ridge, Illinois and completed his residency at Saint Joseph Hospital of Chicago, Illinois.

== HIV research ==
At Northstar Medical Center, where he serves as principal investigator, Berger has conducted nearly 200 HIV-related clinical trials. Well known in the antiretroviral drug research and development community, Berger has published dozens of articles in peer-reviewed medical journals and authored abstracts in many international conferences on HIV-related treatment.

During the first years of HIV treatment development, Berger presented his work on several watershed studies on the development of the drug cocktail. Highlights include a presentation at the 1992 International AIDS Conference describing the first use of combination therapy with zidovudine and didanosine for patients who were consistently p24 anti-genemic despite zidovudine monotherapy. Also, Berger conducted the first investigations of interleukin II in advanced HIV disease patients, presented at the 1998 International Conference on AIDS.

During the years 2005–2010, antiretroviral therapy for HIV disease experienced a revolution in therapeutics. Berger was heavily involved as principal investigator of these agents and co-authored several resultant iconic publications of trials including the Power 2, Titan, Duet and Startmrk studies and the first studies of elvitegravir. Berger often lectures to physicians around the US on topics relating to incorporating of newer antiretroviral therapies into treatment. Additionally, Berger frequently publishes editorial articles in the lay press.

From 2012 to the present, Berger has been conducting studies with newer antiretroviral agents and participating in clinical trials that have led to a fine-tuning of treatment of HIV infection and contributed to the development of Gilead Sciences' Stribild, Complera, TAF (Tenofovir Alfonamide), Genvoya, Odefsey and GS 9883, as well as Merck's non-nucleoside reverse transcriptase inhibitor MK-1439 (Doravirine). Current studies include a study of African American HIV patients (GS-US-380-4580) with the protocol title, "A Phase 3b, Multicenter, Open-Label Study to Evaluate Switching From a Regimen of Two Nucleos(t)ide Reverse Transcriptase Inhibitors (NRTI) plus a Third Agent to a Fixed Dose Combination (FDC) of Bictegravir/Emtricitabine/Tenofovir Alafenamide (B/F/TAF), in Virologically- Suppressed, HIV-1 Infected African American Participants."

Berger is currently involved in studies of newer antiretroviral agents with novel mechanisms of action: Lencapravir (which belongs to a new class of drugs called capsid inhibitors which can be administered by injection every 6 months) and Islatravir, from Merck (which belongs to a new class of ARV drugs called nucleoside reverse transcriptase translocation inhibitor [NRTTI]).

During the COVID-19 pandemic, Berger was a guest speaker at Larry Bernstein's What Happens Next? conference, speaking on "Treatments: Lessons learned from HIV. "

In 2016, Berger was named "Best Practitioner of the Year" by the Chicago Reader.

== Art Patronage ==
In addition to his medical and research practices, Berger is an avid collector of contemporary art, with a specialization in works by African-American, Chicago-based and queer artists. In 2010, he opened Iceberg Projects, a not-for-profit art gallery, in a refurbished carriage house behind his home in Chicago's Rogers Park neighborhood. Iceberg Projects is operated by Berger and a board of arts professionals including Huey Copeland, Doug Ishcar, John Neff, Carrie Schneider, and Rebecca Walz.

Since 2012, Berger has been a member of the Board of Governors for the School of the Art Institute of Chicago. In 2016, he joined the Collections Committee of the Museum of Contemporary Art, Chicago. He is also Co-President of the board of trustees for the Leslie-Lohman Museum, New York, where he has been a trustee and Collections Committee member since 2016.

In 2014, Dr. Berger founded the Daniel Berger Barbara DeGenevieve Scholarship in Photography, a yearly scholarship to an individual enrolled in the School of the Art Institute of Chicago's MFA program honoring the late Barbara DeGenevieve. A year later, Berger was listed by Newcity’s The Art 50 as one of the top 50 most influential individuals in Chicago's Art Community.

In 2015, Berger acquired the archives of Art+Positive, an affinity group of ACT-UP NY. Later that year, Berger and John Neff (an artist, curator, and art educator who is a founding board member of Iceberg Projects) curated the first exhibition of the archives of Art+Positive, Militant Eroticism, at Iceberg Projects

Berger's arts-related publications include the books Militant Eroticism: The Art+Positive Archives and David Wojnarowicz: Flesh of My Flesh, a biography of AIDS activist David Wojnarowicz. For the 2016 exhibition Broken Flag, Iceberg Projects produced an accompanying chapbook of the same title, curated by Berger and Omar Kholeif.

Berger served as Co-President of Leslie Lohman Museum of Art from January 1, 2019 to January 1, 2021 and is now Chair of Collections and Acquisitions for the museum (where he helped craft the museum's first acquisitions policy). As co-president of LLMA, he was responsible in moving the Museum towards greater inclusivity, spearheading the museum's name change (striking LLM of "Gay and Lesbian Art" and incorporating "Queer" in its new vision statement). Berger was also co-president of the museum during the height of the COVID-19 pandemic and helped maintain financial and programmatic and functioning stability of the Museum during the crisis. He served as chair of a selection committee in search of an interim director and formed a selection committee to hire the permanent position of Museum Director.

Since January 2020, Berger has been a member of the Board of Advisors to the Block Museum of Art at Northwestern University.
