= Terese Pencak Schwartz =

- Born: Wildflecken, displaced persons camp
- Education: Michigan State University
- Known for: World War II history

Terese Pencak Schwartz is an American writer, historian, publicist and fine art photographer, who studied journalism and communication arts at the Michigan State University. Schwartz is the author of Holocaust Forgotten: Five Million Non-Jewish Victims devoted to history of non-Jewish victims of the Holocaust in Poland and elsewhere, published in 2012. She lives in Westlake Village, California.

== Life and work ==
Schwartz was born in a displaced persons camp to a Polish-Catholic family of Holocaust survivors right after World War II. She emigrated to the US with her parents and younger sister when she was two years old. Schwartz was raised in Michigan, where she attended the Michigan State University. She moved to California in her early twenties, where she also married. Schwartz began doing research on the subject of non-Jewish Holocaust victims after she converted from Roman Catholicism to Judaism. She began publishing in 1997. Schwartz is also a practising artist and fine art photographer, as well as juried member of the Thousand Oaks Art Association. The subject of history of the Holocaust related to the non-Jewish victims continues to be of great interest to her. Schwartz is currently working on a second and more expanded volume on the non-Jewish victims.
