= Aryeh Mekel =

Israeli diplomat and journalist (1946–2021)

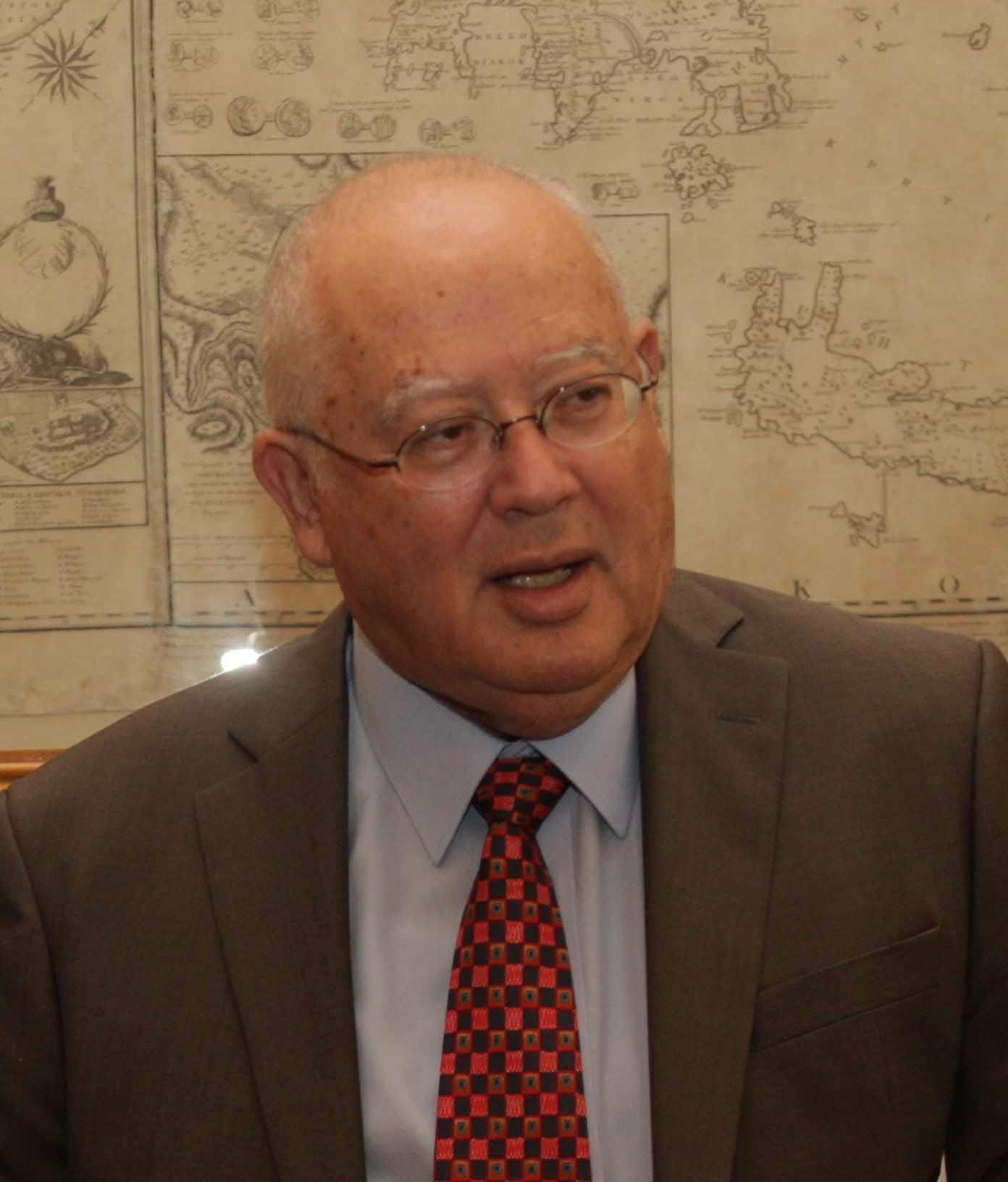
Mekel in 2013

Arye Mekel (Hebrew: אריה מקל; 1946 – June 19, 2021) was an Israeli diplomat and journalist.

== Biography ==
Arye Mekel was born to Holocaust survivors and raised in Israel. He studied at the Hebrew University in Jerusalem, receiving a bachelor's degrees in Political Science and English Language and Literature, and a master's degree in Mass Communication. He also studied at Columbia University in New York, where he received a master's degree in sociology.

Mekel was married to Ruth Mekel, a journalist and public relations consultant. They have three children and five grandchildren.

== Diplomatic career ==
Mekel served as foreign policy adviser to Prime Minister Yitzhak Shamir (1986–1989) Mekel joined Israel's Ministry of Foreign Affairs in 1984 as a senior researcher at the Center for Political Research. He was adviser to Foreign Minister Yitzhak Shamir (1985–1986), director of the Government's Media Center, chargé d'affaires at the Embassy of Israel to South Korea (2001), special adviser to the deputy foreign minister on combating antisemitism (2001–2002) and special government spokesman for foreign media (2000–2002). His roles as a diplomat included Consul General of Israel to the Southeastern United States based in Atlanta, Georgia (1993–2000), Deputy Permanent Representative of Israel to the United Nations (2003–2004), and Consul General of Israel in New York (2004–2007). He also served as director of the press department and spokesman of the Ministry of Foreign Affairs, as well as deputy director general for cultural and scientific affairs. In 2010, he assumed his position as Ambassador of the State of Israel to Greece, in which he served until summer of 2014. He was a senior research associate at the Begin-Sadat center for strategic studies at Bar Ilan University in Israel.

== Journalism and academic career ==
His career in journalism began during military service in the Israel Defense Forces, where he served as a military and political correspondent for Israel Army Radio. He then joined Israel Public Radio (Voice of Israel), as a senior editor and political correspondent, and later its U.S. correspondent. He was also an adjunct professor of Judaic studies at the University of Cincinnati and a representative of the World Zionist Organization in Cincinnati, Ohio (1976–1979) and director general of the Israel Broadcasting Authority, responsible for all State television and radio (1989–1993).
