= Geezer Bandit =

American bank robber

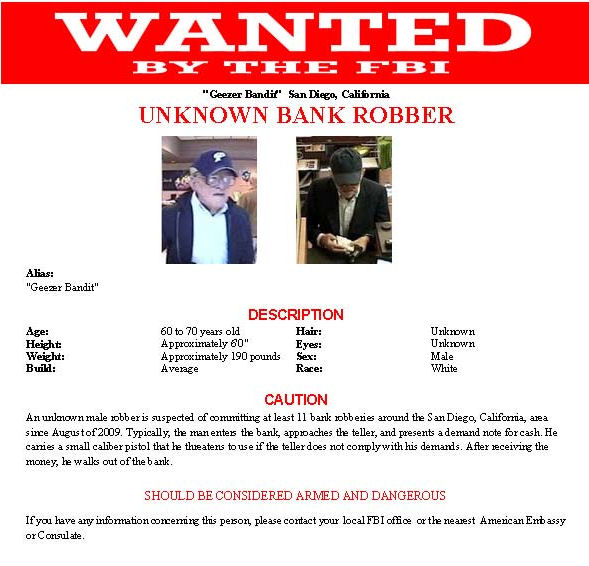
- Geezer Bandit Wanted Poster
- Occupation: Bank Robber
- Known for: Bank robbery
- Height: 5 ft 10 in (178 cm) - 6 ft 0 in
- Status: At large
- Reward amount: $20,000
- Capture status: Fugitive
- Wanted by: FBI
- Wanted since: August 2009

"Geezer Bandit" is the name given by the FBI to a man who committed a series of bank robberies in Southern California, United States.

The Geezer Bandit is accused of robbing at least sixteen banks, many in the San Diego, California, area. His last known robbery occurred on Friday, December 2, 2011 and he is considered a fugitive given he is still at large.

== Investigation ==
The FBI's field offices in California worked with local law enforcement to solve the serial robberies in Southern California. The Geezer Bandit was listed on America's Most Wanted in October 2010. The reward was up to $20,000 to provide information leading to the arrest and conviction of the Geezer Bandit.

=== Description ===
The Geezer Bandit is suspected to be a white male between the ages of 60–70 years old who is between 5'10" and 6'0" and between 190 and 200 lb with an average build and, judging from footage and eyewitness accounts, he is left-handed.

=== Modus operandi ===
The Geezer Bandit comes into the bank like a normal customer, approaches the teller with a leather case, and then draws a revolver from the case and demands money from the teller by handing the teller a note. A teller who was one of the 13 people to have direct contact with the Geezer Bandit stated on America's Most Wanted that she was given a note that read, "Give me $50,000 or I will murder you."

== Theories ==
The man appears to be in his mid- to late seventies; however, some members of law enforcement have stated their beliefs that he may not be an elderly man. One theory is that the man is disguised and is using a silicone mask. The string of robberies started in August 2009 in San Diego, California.

The FBI has started to question makers of special effects masks to get insight into the Geezer Bandit robberies. This comes in part after a white male in Ohio pleaded guilty to robbing banks in a mask that made him look like a black male. Interest in realistic theatrical disguise also increased after a young East Asian man was able to board a plane from Hong Kong to Canada wearing the mask of an elderly white male.

John Walsh, host of America's Most Wanted, believes the Geezer Bandit is actually a young person in disguise due to surveillance footage of his latest robbery, which showed him running abnormally fast for an elderly person after a dye pack exploded in the money bag he had.

== Robberies committed ==
1. US Bank, August 28, 2009 in Santee, California
2. San Diego National Bank, September 12, 2009 in San Diego, California
3. US Bank, October 9, 2009 in San Diego
4. Bank of America, October 26, 2009 in Rancho Santa Fe, California
5. Bank of America, November 16, 2009 in San Diego
6. San Diego National Bank, January 27, 2010 in San Diego
7. California Bank & Trust, April 20, 2010 in Vista, California
8. US Bank, April 30, 2010, in Vista
9. Bank of America, May 11, 2010 in Santee
10. US Bank, June 7, 2010 in Poway, California
11. Bank of America, June 25, 2010 in Temecula, California
12. Bank of America, November 12, 2010, in Bakersfield, California
13. Bank of America, January 28, 2011 in Goleta, California
14. Heritage Oaks Bank, May 27, 2011 in Morro Bay, California
15. Wells Fargo, September 30, 2011 in San Diego
16. Bank of America, December 2, 2011 in San Luis Obispo, California

== Pop culture ==
=== America's Most Wanted ===
In January 2011, Geezer Bandit was profiled on America's Most Wanted and San Diego's Most Wanted.

=== Copycat ===
An apparent copycat of the Geezer Bandit made an appearance in an attempt to replicate the robbery tactic. In an attempt to pull off a robbery, the fake Geezer Bandit was not careful in his getaway, and ended up in police custody. The police do not believe he is the real Geezer Bandit.

=== Fanbase ===
The Geezer Bandit has a following that has started several Facebook pages showing support for him and his crime spree. Several news media outlets have reported that many people are trying to capitalize on the fan draw of the Geezer Bandit by making "Geezer Bandit" T-shirts imprinted with a picture of the felon from surveillance images of his robberies.

On the February 5, 2011, episode of America's Most Wanted, one fan-made shirt read:

GEEZER BANDIT
is my name
GETTIN' AWAY
is my game

== See also ==
- List of crimes involving a silicone mask
- List of fugitives from justice who disappeared
