= HFX =

HFX may refer to:

- Halifax, a city in Nova Scotia, Canada
- HFX Wanderers FC, a Canadian professional soccer club in Halifax, Nova Scotia
- Halifax International Security Forum, annual event in Halifax, Nova Scotia
- Halifax railway station (England), National Rail code HFX, railway station in West Yorkshire, England
- HFX (Organization), non-profit headquartered in Washington, D.C., United States, organizers of Halifax International Security Forum
