= Abderrahim Foukara =

American journalist

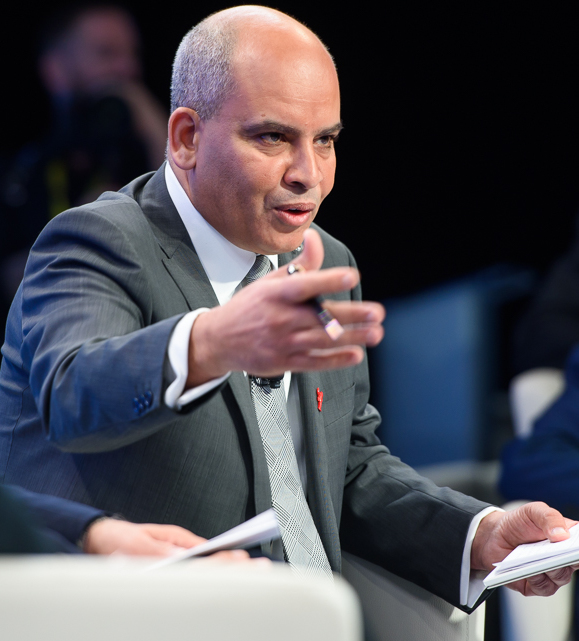
- Foukara at the Halifax International Security Forum 2017
- Born: April 14, 1962 (age 63); Marrakesh, Morocco
- Occupations: Al Jazeera's Washington, D.C. bureau chief Host of Min Washington
- Years active: 1990–present

Abderrahim Foukara (Arabic: عبد الرحيم فقراء; born April 14, 1962) is the Al Jazeera's Washington, D.C. bureau chief.

== Career timeline ==
- Early 2006–present: Al Jazeera's Washington, D.C. bureau chief
- Early 2006–present : Host of Min Washington ('From Washington'), a weekly show on American Politics and Culture
- Early 2003 – Early 2006: Head of Al-Jazeera New York Bureau's United Nations office
- Summer 2002 – Early 2003: Al Jazeera Reporter from Washington, D.C.
- 2001 – Summer 2002: BBC Reporter from Washington, D.C.
- 1999–2001: producer and reporter on the World, a co-production of the BBC, Public Radio International and WGBH Boston
- 1990–1999: producer, reporter, anchor and senior instructor on BBC World Service
