= Halifax International Security Forum =

Annual summit in Nova Scotia, Canada

- Nickname: HFX
- Founded: November 18, 2011; 15 years ago
- Purpose: International security
- Headquarters: Washington, D.C., US
- Location: Halifax, Nova Scotia, Canada
- Region served: Worldwide
- President: Peter Van Praagh
- Board of directors: Dr. Janice Stein (Chair); Mark William Lippert (Vice Chair); Ahmet Taçyıldız (Treasurer); Kolinda Grabar-Kitarović; Japheth J. Omojuwa; Dr. Luis Rubio; Rob Bauer; Dean Fealk
- Website: www.halifaxtheforum.org

The Halifax International Security Forum (also known as HISF or Halifax Forum) is an annual summit for international government and military officials, academic experts, authors and entrepreneurs, held in Halifax, Nova Scotia, Canada. It is organized by HFX, an organization headquartered in Washington, D.C. that describes itself and has been quoted as an "independent, nonpartisan, nonprofit organization". HFX addresses global security issues through various programs, with the Halifax International Security Forum serving as its flagship event. The 17th Halifax International Security Forum was held from 21 to 23 November 2025.

== History ==
HFX originated from the Halifax International Security Forum, which was founded in 2009 as a program within the German Marshall Fund of the United States. The forum received financial support from the Canadian government. In 2011, the forum became an independent organization, rebranding as HFX, with Foreign Affairs joining as a media partner.

The forum founders include Laura Bridge, Tom Clark, Dan Dugas, Dean Fealk, Marian Fernet, Renée Filiatrault, Joseph Hall, David Kramer, John MacDonell, George Macphee, Steve Markle, Duane Monea, Jeff Mullen, Paul Owens, Jay Paxton, Jonathan Tepperman, Jill Sinclair, Janice Gross Stein, and Jonathan Weisstub.

== Organization ==
HFX is governed by an international board of directors, including Dr. Janice Stein as Chair, Mark William Lippert as Vice Chair, Ahmet Taçyıldız as Treasurer, and members Kolinda Grabar-Kitarović, Joshua J. Omojuwa, Dr. Luis Rubio, Rob Bauer, and Dean Fealk. The President of the organization is Peter Van Praagh. HFX cooperates with institutional partners, including its founding partners: the Department of National Defence (DND) and the Atlantic Canada Opportunities Agency (ACOA).

HFX receives funding from a diverse range of sources, including international organizations such as NATO and the European Union; technology companies like Amazon Web Services (AWS); defense and aerospace firms including CAE, Kongsberg, MDA, Saab, and TKMS; and other entities such as Ipsos and the Canadian Association of Defence and Security Industries (CADSI). The organization's Club HFX: The Pro-Democracy Business Group includes ATCO and Pansophico.

== Programs ==
=== Halifax International Security Forum ===
The Halifax International Security Forum is HFX's flagship annual event, held at The Westin Nova Scotian in Halifax, Nova Scotia, Canada. The meeting brings together 300 delegates from over 70 countries and has been referred to by Canadian media as "The Davos of international security". This summit is the only event of its kind in North America.

==== Format ====
The annual forum starts Friday afternoon with an introduction and a first plenary. Friday evening features a gala dinner followed by off-the-record "night-owl-sessions". After the plenaries on Saturday, there are more than 20 dinner discussions on a variety of topics. Sunday morning starts with a 5K run followed by off-the-record breakfast sessions. The forum ends after the plenaries and closing remarks with a press conference Sunday afternoon.

==== 2024 forum ====
The 2024 Halifax International Security Forum from 22 to 24 November 2024 and was attended by 300 delegates from 60 countries. Occurring shortly after the United States presidential election, the meeting provided an early opportunity for international policymakers and defense officials to discuss possible implications of the new U.S. administration.

In the run-up, organizers released two contrasting agendas to underscore potential global trajectories following the U.S. election. Discussions focused on geopolitical uncertainty, transatlantic defense commitments, and the role of emerging technologies, such as artificial intelligence (AI) in warfare. Participants addressed ongoing conflicts in Ukraine and the Middle East, security challenges associated with China, Russia, Iran, and North Korea, and the growing strategic importance of the Arctic.

In his opening remarks, President Peter van Praagh, emphasized the importance of supporting Ukraine as a pillar of global security. Canadian Minister of National Defense, Bill Blair, highlighted challenges posed by Russia and China, the need to protect the Arctic, and support for democratic partners including Ukraine and Taiwan.

A key topic at the forum was the anticipated foreign-policy direction of a new U.S. administration under Donald Trump and its implications for NATO and transatlantic relations. European officials, including Dutch Chief of Defence of the Netherlands General Onno Eichelsheim, expressed cautious optimism that the United States would maintain its commitments to European defense, while noting European measures since 2016 to raise defence spending and reduce energy dependence on Russia, U.S. legislators pointed to institutional resilience amid prospective shifts in priorities. Debate over women's participation in combat roles featured prominently following the nomination of Pete Hegseth as U.S. Secretary of Defense. General Jennie Carignan, Canada's Chief of the Defense Staff, outlined the longstanding contributions of women to military operations and advocated for inclusivity within the armed forces, earning a standing ovation. Canada's defense spending was also discussed: U.S. Senator Jim Risch criticized Canada's plan to meet NATO's 2% GDP defense target by 2032 as inadequate. In response, Minister Blair affirmed Canada's commitment to investments in surveillance, submarine, and other defense capabilities to align with alliance expectations.

Other topics included sustaining support for Ukraine, and reinforcing a rules-based international order, strategic considerations in the Indo-Pacific, cyber defense, climate-related security risks, the Arctic's growing strategic significance, and the regulation of AI in military contexts.

Findings from the "HISF-Ipsos Threat Index" survey identified disinformation and cyberattacks as leading global concerns. Participants also examined the influence of private sector leaders in shaping foreign policy, referencing comments by U.S. Senator Marco Rubio on technology executives' relationships with foreign governments including Elon Musk and China, and their potential impact on U.S. strategic interests.

The 2024 John McCain Prize for Leadership in Public Service was awarded to Russian opposition figure and Pulitzer Prize-winning journalist Vladimir Kara-Murza for his advocacy of democratic principles. Former Taiwanese President, Tsai Ing-wen, the 2020 recipient, was formally presented her award, after being unable to attend in 2020 due to the COVID-19 pandemic. The 2024 Halifax Builder Award was conferred on U.S. Senators Jim Risch and Jeanne Shaheen.

Youth participation included the 15@15: Youth Building Democracy program, which brought six international winners from Ukraine, Taiwan, the United States, India, and Jamaica, to attend the forum and take part in discussions on global security and democratic values.

==== 2023 forum ====
The 2023 Halifax International Security Forum was held from 17 to 19 of November 2023. The event was attended by 600 delegates from more than 60 countries. There were high-profile guests such as Canadian National Defence Minister Bill Blair and former Israel prime minister Ehud Barak. The Russian invasion of Ukraine, climate change and the Gaza war were the main topics.

A key topic of the forum was "Victory in Ukraine", which presented Ukraine's defense as essential to maintaining the international rules-based order. The acronym CRINK (China, Russia, Iran, North Korea), coined by forum president Peter Van Praag, appeared in the titles of several discussions, including such as 'Never Mind the BRICS, Here's the CRINKs'.

The forum also addressed the link between the war in Ukraine and the conflict in Gaza. Van Praagh stated that, "Victory in Ukraine equals victory for Israel." Former Israeli Prime Minister Ehud Barak, commenting on the situation in Gaza, described Israel's military response as both necessary and justified. Demonstrations outside the venue called for a ceasefire in Gaza.

Canada's Minister of National Defense, Bill Blair, reaffirmed Canada's "unequivocal support" for Ukraine, and emphasized that "all civilians must be protected, and the laws of armed conflict must be respected" in Gaza.

U.S. Senators Jeanne Shaheen and James Risch reiterated support for both Ukraine and Israel. In a message to the forum, Ukraine's First Lady Olena Zelenska warned, "If Ukraine falls, the war will not stop; it will escalate globally."

The forum also addressed the broader threat posed by authoritarian regimes. Iranian activist Masih Alinejad and Russian opposition leader Garry Kasparov emphasized that ensuring global security depends on confronting both external aggression and internal authoritarian practices.

British Member of Parliament, Alicia Kearns, stated that democratic states were inadequately prepared for multiple simultaneous global crises, citing a "glaring awareness" of existing international capacity shortfalls.

U.S. Special Envoy Penny Pritzker presented Ukraine's economic recovery strategy, which included rebuilding critical infrastructure and providing support refugees and veterans.

The John McCain Prize for Leadership in Public Service was awarded to the people of Israel. The award was accepted by Brothers and Sisters in Arms, an Israeli reservist organization advocating for judicial independence. Mike Savage, then Mayor of Halifax, received the 2023 Halifax Builder Award.

==== 2022 forum ====
The 2022 Halifax International Security Forum was held from 18 to 20 of November 2022. It was attended by 300 delegates from more than 50 countries, including government ministers, military leaders, policy experts, and journalists.

Participants included Canada's Minister of Defence Anita Anand, U.S. Secretary of Defense Lloyd J. Austin III, Iranian journalist and activist Masih Alinejad, as well as representatives from the United States, Ukraine, Estonia, Sweden, Kosovo, Switzerland, and Taiwan.

In her opening speech, Defense Minister Anand addressed the evolving global security environment with Russia's war against Ukraine and China's behavior in the Indo-Pacific as key challenges.

The prominent topic at the forum was Vladimir Putin's illegal invasion of Ukraine. In a prerecorded video, Ukrainian President Volodymyr Zelenskyy addressed the Forum, stated that peace could not be achieved on Russia's terms and called for continued international support in the form of military assistance, food and energy, as well as the release of prisoners of war and deportees. He also called for the implementation of relevant protections under the UN Charter and the restoration of Ukraine's territorial integrity.

Former Ukrainian President Petro Poroshenko also participated, emphasizing that Russian President Vladimir Putin could not be trusted to negotiate a lasting peace agreement.

U.S. Secretary of Defense Lloyd J. Austin III delivered a speech entitled "Why Ukraine Matters," in which he stressed the significance of the war's outcome for global security, arguing that the invasion threatened European security, challenged NATO allies, attacked shared values, and undermined the rules-based international order.

In addition to discussion on the war in Ukraine, the forum addressed a wide range of global issues, including the geopolitical and technological rivalry between the United States and China, the impact of climate change, food and energy security, technology, the dangers of disinformation spread by governments and social media apps, the future of democracy, developments in North Korea, and the street protests in Iran. In a panel titled "Mind the Gap: Keeping Our Tech Superiority," Anton La Guardia, The Economist's diplomatic editor, discussed emerging challenges related to technology competition across air, sea, cyber, and space domains.

The 2022 Forum also highlighted the contributions of women in global security and public service. The John McCain Prize for Leadership in Public Service was awarded collectively to the women of Ukraine and was accepted by the First Lady of Ukraine Olena Zelenska. The Peace with Women Fellowship, another component of the Forum, continued its focus on advancing women's participation in security and defense sectors.

==== 2021 forum ====
The 2021 Halifax International Security Forum was held from 19 to 21 of November 2021. It was attended by more than 300 delegates from over 80 countries. Notable attendees included Nova Scotia Premier Tim Houston, Halifax Mayor Mike Savage, Defense Minister Anita Anand, and Members of Parliament Andy Fillmore and Darren Fisher, as well as senior U.S. officials such as Admiral John Aquilino, head of U.S. Indo-Pacific Command. The 2021 forum was the first in-person event in two years due to the ongoing COVID-19 pandemic.

One of the key topics discussed at the forum was the possibility of China invading Taiwan. In his opening speech, Peter van Praagh introduced the forum's #StandTogetherOnChina social media campaign. The campaign was designed to raise awareness of human rights abuses including the oppression of Uyghurs and bring democratic leaders together to address these challenges. Leaders from the United States and Canada emphasized the importance of upholding the rules-based international order and collaborating and committing to a free and open Indo-Pacific region.

Another prominent issue was the U.S. withdrawal and the Taliban takeover of Afghanistan. Many foreign officials viewed it as a betrayal of Washington’s commitment to the struggling democracy of the country. U.S. Senator Chris Coons talked about the January 2021 attack on the U.S. Capitol in Washington and its impact on American democracy, while former Australian Prime Minister Malcolm Turnbull reflected on the public's international faith in perceptions of U.S. democratic resilience.

During the closing ceremony, Ambassador Cindy McCain received the Forum’s Builder Award, and the John McCainPrize for Leadership in Public Service was presented to the Afghan Female Tactical Platoon.

The Forum also featured the Peace With Women Fellowship, an HFX initiative bringing together senior female military officers from NATO and partner nations. Prior to the forum, the 2021 Fellows met with Prime Minister Justin Trudeau and Defence Minister Anita Anand in Ottawa. The 2021 cohort included 12 senior officers representing Canada, France, the Netherlands, Australia, New Zealand, Lithuania, the United Kingdom, the United States, the Republic of North Macedonia, Sweden, Turkey, and Portugal.

==== 2020 forum ====
The 2020 Halifax International Security Forum was held from 20 to 22 November 2020.

==== 2019 forum ====
The 2019 Halifax International Security Forum was held from 22 to 24 November 2019.

==== 2018 forum ====
The 2018 Halifax International Security Forum was held from 16 to 18 November 2018.

==== 2017 forum ====
The 2017 Halifax International Security Forum was attended by delegates from more than 80 countries. The forum celebrated 150 years of Canadian Confederation and the 100th anniversary of the Halifax Explosion. Along with Dalhousie University and Saint Mary's University, the forum hosted a public event on the future of global leadership with Tawakkol Karman, Bessma Momani, General Petr Pavel, and Jonathan Tepperman. The event was held prior to the official conference launch and was moderated by Tom Clark, former Global News host.

The forum was opened by Harjit Sajjan, Canadian Minister of National Defence, who gave the opening speech, followed by remarks from Michèle Coninsx, Assistant Secretary General of the United Nations, and Scott Brison, president of the Treasury Board of Canada. The opening was followed by the first out of a total of three Halifax Chats that were scheduled throughout the forum. The first Halifax Chat with Minister Sajjan and Secretary General of NATO Jens Stoltenberg was moderated by Robin Shepherd and centered on Canada's role in European peacekeeping missions, the need for increased incorporation of women into the military, and the importance of ongoing American leadership in NATO.

The forum's opening panel, titled "Peace? Prosperity? Principle? Securing What Purpose?"," was hosted by Gideon Rose, editor of Foreign Affairs. The panelists Jane Harman, CEO of the Woodrow Wilson International Center for Scholars, Kay Bailey Hutchison, United States Permanent Representative to NATO, Margaret MacMillan, historian and professor at the University of Toronto, and Constanze Stelzenmüller, fellow at Brookings Institution, discussed how people's faith in democracy and international institutions was under threat, and what could be done to strengthen these institutions and address people's frustrations.

During a gala dinner at Pier 21, the 2017 Halifax Builder Award was presented to NATO and accepted by its Secretary General Stoltenberg. Remarks were made by Senator Jeanne Shaheen. The 2017 Forum also marked the announcement of the annual "John McCain Prize for Courage in Public Service", which will be awarded for the first time at the 2018 Forum.

Against the backdrop of an incident during a NATO military exercise in Norway, General Hulusi Akar, commander of the Turkish Armed Forces, stressed Ankara's commitment to NATO: "Turkey's alliance with NATO should not be undermined, and NATO is the most successful and most effective military organization that has existed throughout history."

A key topic at the forum was nuclear deterrence and diplomacy. In the second panel discussion entitled "Nukes: The Fire and the Fury" Steven Clemons, editor-at-large of The Atlantic, moderated the conversation between General John E. Hyten, commander of US Strategic Command (USSTRATCOM), Bonnie Jenkins, the US State Department's Coordinator for Threat Reduction Programs, Sung-han Kim, dean and professor of international relations at the Graduate School of International Studies (GSIS), and Moshe Ya'alon, former Israeli Minister of Defence. The conversation centered around the future of North Korea, Iranian nuclear capabilities and the role and politics of the United States in global nuclear deterrence. Hyten, in light of recent escalations of nuclear rhetoric, said: "The way the process works is this simple: I provide advice to the President. He'll tell me what to do and if it's illegal, guess what's going to happen? I'm going to say, Mr. President, it's illegal." The statement was quickly picked up by national and international media.

In a panel discussion entitled "Weaponizing Capital: One Belt, One Road, One Way", the panelists General Bryan Fenton, deputy commander of US Pacific Command (USPACOM), Edward Luce, Washington columnist and commentator for the Financial Times, Ong Keng Yong, chairman of the S. Rajaratnam School of International Studies at the Nanyang Technological University in Singapore, and US Navy Secretary Richard V. Spencer discussed China's aim to take a larger role in world affairs and global trade through their One Belt One Road Initiative and examined what military and economic impact the initiative will have as Beijing expands its influence.

"Making Peace With Women" was the fourth panel discussion between Fauizya Ali, founder and president of Women In International Security (WIIS) in Kenya, Pastor Esther Ibanga, Jos Christian Missions International in Nigeria, human rights activist Tawakkol Karman from Yemen, who was awarded the 2011 Nobel Peace Prize, Nancy Lindborg, president of the United States Institute of Peace, Senator Jeanne Shaheen, the first woman in US history to be elected both a Governor and a United States Senator, and General Jonathan Vance, Chief of the Defence Staff of the Canadian Armed Forces. The talk was moderated by Nahlah Ayed from CBC News. The panelists discussed how women play vital roles in creating lasting peace from conflict, and the future of peacebuilding and where progress can be made for women throughout the world. At the beginning of the panel session the establishment of the "Halifax Peace With Women Fellowship" was announced for the fall of 2018.

During the second Halifax Chat, Abdullah Abdullah, chief executive of the Islamic Republic of Afghanistan, spoke with Robin Shepherd about the current state of Afghanistan and what the future holds, including continued improvements in the economy, security, and human rights.

"Open war is what we see in the Ukraine, and it breaks all rules of a civilized world," said Poland's Minister of National Defence, Antoni Macierewicz, in a panel titled "Rapprochement with Russia: Post-Putin Prep". The panel examined Putin's interferences in global affairs, including cyberwarfare and militaristic intervention in neighboring states, and cooperative solutions for addressing the threats Russia possesses to its neighbors and the world. Other panelists were Pavlo Klimkin, Minister for Foreign Affairs of Ukraine, Vladimir Milov, founder and president of the Institute of Energy Policy, and Senator Jeanne Shaheen. The conversation was moderated by POLITICO's columnist Susan Glasser.

In the panel "Satellite Armies: The Race in Space", panelists discussed the complexities and unknown potentials of satellites space weaponry, and how this final frontier needs new laws and regulations to address these potential unknowns. Jeanne Meserve moderated the conversation between Theresa Hitchens, Senior research associate at the Center for International and Security Studies at Maryland (CISSM), General Hyten, Commander of US STRATCOM, Julie Perkins, chief engineer of In-space vehicle propulsion systems for Boeing, and Rajeswari Rajagopalan, senior fellow and head of the nuclear and space policy initiative at the Observer Research Foundation (ORF).

The second day of the forum concluded with the third Halifax Chat featuring Eric Schmidt on the future of the digital world. Schmidt, executive chairman of Alphabet Inc., talked about Alphabet's efforts to curb the spread of false information on the internet, the increasing importance of artificial intelligence in global affairs, and future technological capabilities to address military needs.

A wide range of topics—from Afghanistan politics and the evolution of terrorism to the geopolitics of energy—were discussed during off-the-record dinner and late-night sessions.

The 2017 Forum was closed by two Sunday morning panels. The first panel, titled "Rebuilding the Middle East: From Civil War to Civil Society", was moderated by Abderrahim Foukara, D.C. bureau chief of Al Jazeera. "We are at risk of another civil war if the international community does not get Iraq engaged", said Falah Mustafa Bakir, head of the Kurdistan Regional Government's (KRG) Department of Foreign Relations (DFR), commenting the panel's discussion on Western interventions in the Middle East in recent years and the ongoing attempts to build democratic institutions in the region. Along with specific interventions and requirements like education, investments, and planning, the two panel participants also discussed global trends. Tzipi Livni, Israel's former Foreign Minister, commented: "All over the world we see the erosion of democracy. We need to be united to address this."

The panelists of the final panel were Carl Bildt, former Prime Minister of Sweden, Masashi Nishihara, president of the Research Institute for Peace and Security, Mayor Dale Ross, City of Georgetown, Texas, and Nicolas Tenzer, editor and director of Le Banquet as well as the founding president of the Center for the Study and Reflection of Political Action. The panel "Climate Change: Houston, We Have a Solution" addressed the importance of moving beyond the politics of climate change to find practical solutions. The participants discussed the technological advances necessary for these solutions. The panel was moderated by Tom Clark.

==== 2016 forum ====
The 2016 Halifax International Security Forum was the first major international gathering after the US presidential election ten days earlier. It was attended by delegates from 70 countries. The forum started with a ministerial meeting on peacekeeping hosted by Canada's Department of National Defence and Canadian Minister of National Defence Harjit Sajjan with Hervé Ladsous, UN Under-Secretary-General for Peacekeeping Operations, and Atul Khare, Head of the Department of Field Support.

The Canadian Minister of National Defence, Harjit Sajjan, held the forum's opening speech.

A key topic at the forum was democracy. In a panel discussion entitled "Make Democracy Great Again" the UK Secretary of State for Defence, Sir Michael Fallon, the professor of political science from the Hebrew University of Jerusalem, Shlomo Avineri and the Turkish Minister for EU Affairs, Ömer Çelik discussed the western democratic model in the panel which was moderated by Jonathan Tepperman, managing editor of Foreign Affairs magazine. Fallon, against the backdrop of Brexit, said: "Although Britain is leaving the European Union we still have a role to pay in defending our European continent... and to continue to make democracy great again." Referring to the United States presidential election, he added: "...He (Donald Trump) knows from his election that we cannot take democracy for granted... This is no time for any of us to turn inwards".

"The West Block", the forum's opening panel discussion on democracy, peace and conflict, was hosted by Tom Clark of Global News. Clark interviewed Minister Harjit Sajjan, General Jonathan Vance and Paula Dobriansky. In light of statements made by Trump during the campaign suggesting a review of NATO, Dobriansky told the audience: "There's a lack of importance attached to not only the values but the alliances and also the institutions that preserved peace, stability and security post-World War II, no less the Cold War". Dobriansky mentioned pressure on NATO members to fulfill the agreed contributions would have increased no matter which candidate won. "It's not a new issue," Dobriansky said. Rose Gottemoeller, NATO's Deputy Secretary General, during a separate panel discussion entitled "NATO: Necessary", reported that Secretary General of NATO Jens Stoltenberg had a conversation with the US president regarding the issue. "The two men agreed about the enduring importance of the NATO alliance and the enduring importance of increased defense spending," Gottemoeller said. New Hampshire Democratic Senator Jeanne Shaheen, also took part in the panel. Shaheen spoke about the role of the US Congress emphasizing: "There is strong support for NATO and I don't see that changing under President Trump."

The president-elect Donald Trump dominated most of the panel discussions. The panel "The Superpower's Enduring Priorities: Trade, Justice and the American Way" was an example for that. The panelists Rosa Brooks, professor of law and associate dean for graduate programs at Georgetown University Law Center, Admiral Harry B. Harris Jr., commander of the United States Pacific Command, Josef Joffe, publisher and editor of Die Zeit and moderator Gideon Rose, editor of Foreign Affairs, discussed the uncertainty occurring within the international community as to how the new US president would govern and execute his presidency as well as the international implications.

A key topic under discussion during the conference was a statement made by Trump in previous debates about him favoring a torture method called waterboarding. Gideon Rose, editor of the magazine Foreign Affairs, commented on the discussed topic. "Let me say how appalling and heartbreaking it is that we have to have a discussion about the possibility ... about whether the United States policy really will be not to engage in war crimes," he said. In this regard US Senator John McCain in a chat with US Senator John Barrasso emphasized that US congress had already banned the torture method. He went on to add: "I don't give a damn what the president of United States wants to do or anybody else wants to do, we will not waterboard. We will not torture people … It doesn't work."

Other panel discussions sought to address the war in Syria and growing global terrorism, climate change as both an environmental and economic threat, and the intersection of cyber security and national security and the shared responsibility between the government and private sector to develop policies that protect from existing and new cyber threats.

Virginia Democratic Senator Tim Kaine, who served as 2016 Vice-Presidential Candidate, received the 2016 Halifax Builder Award.

==== 2015 forum ====
The 2015 Halifax International Security Forum took place against the backdrop of the ISIS terror attacks in Paris and was attended by 300 delegates from 60 countries. The terror attack was the main topic of the forum discussions.

Harjit Sajjan, Canadian Minister of National Defence, gave the opening keynote. For Sajjan it was the first major public event he attended after his inauguration earlier that month. In his speech, Sajjan also addressed the situation of Syrian refugees and defended the government's plan to resettle 25,000 refugees in Canada. The minister described democratic societies welcoming Syrian refugees as a major strike against the ideology of Islamic terrorists. This sent a "great message to ISIS", Sajjan told the audience. The forum's opening session addressed the new objectives in Canada's foreign policy. During the US/Canadian panel discussion Sajjan supported targeting ISIS in Syria and Iraq with air strikes in preparation for a ground assault. as a preparation for ground troops. But the Afghanistan War veteran also warned about the "second and third effects" of indiscriminate bombings, a point with which all panelists agreed.

William E. Gortney, commander of US Northern Command, told the audience that "carpet bombing" was not the answer to terrorism. Jonathan Vance, Chief of the Defence Staff of the Canadian Armed Forces, said that "You can't carpet bomb your way to victory". Panelist John R. Allen, former Special Presidential Envoy for Defeating ISIS, who attended the panel and later had an additional appearance at the Halifax Chat, emphasized the necessity to fight ISIS also financially and in the sphere of information warfare. Allen told the audience that for the US a massive ground operation was not on the agenda. He instead favored operations by combined special forces.

Speaking at a panel on global security threats, General Petr Pavel, chairman of the NATO Military Committee, stressed the need for "a much broader approach" to fight ISIS and called for a greater involvement of NATO without making it to a "NATO-led anti-ISIS operation".

Admiral Harry B. Harris Jr., commander of the United States Pacific Command, made the opening remarks for a panel discussion on China's ambitions in the Asia-Pacific region. Addressing the territorial disputes between China and its neighbors in the South China Sea, Harris emphasized that "the United States will continue to fly, sail and operate anywhere international law allows and that the South China Sea is not, and will not be, an exception". He criticized Chinese efforts to develop man-made islands within disputed territories and called them a "Great Wall of Sand" and "Sandcastles in the Sea". Harris described China as a country which had abandoned Deng Xiaoping's philosophy of patience. "In fact, China has transitioned from a patient nation to a nation in a hurry", Harris told the audience. The Admiral expressed his belief that a conflict with China was not inevitable but emphasized the need to develop the bilateral relationship with a long-term perspective.

During the following panel discussion, Admiral Michael S. Rogers, commander of the United States Cyber Command, director of the National Security Agency and chief of the Central Security Service, blamed China for its cyber-attacks against the United States. Rogers described China as a nation which would hack private companies and share stolen intellectual property with Chinese companies. The admiral warned China that it also could be the target of cyber-intrusions and described the country as being "as vulnerable as any other major industrialized nation state". Rogers expressed his hope that China would refrain from future cyber-attacks against the US.

Further topics of the 2015 forum were current developments in the Muslim world, the European migrant crisis, and ways to cut off the financing for international terror networks.

==== 2014 forum ====
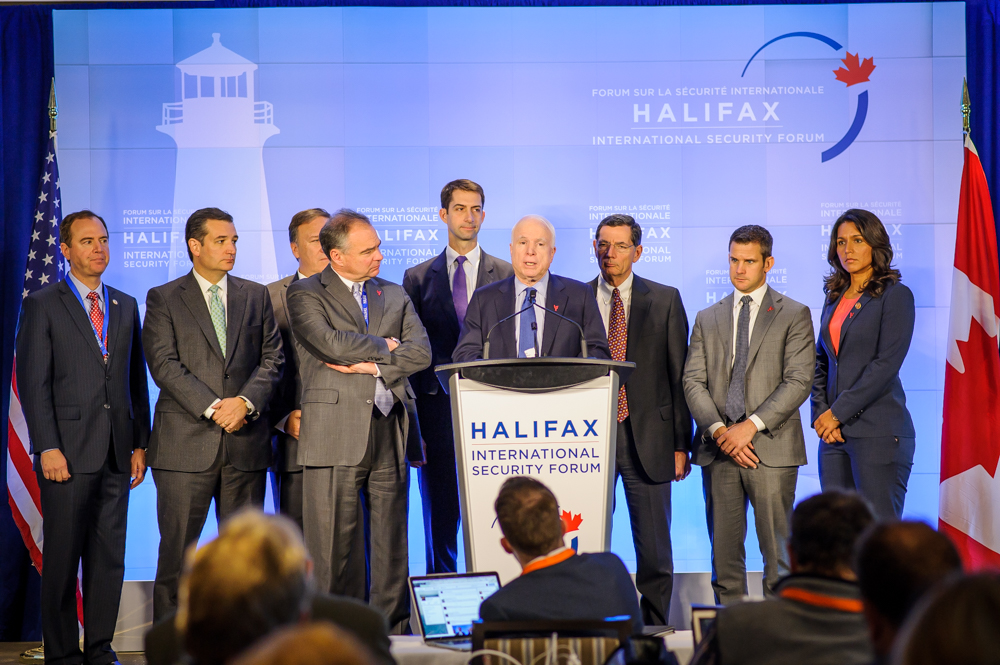
Senator John McCain speaks during a press conference held by the US congressional delegation at HISF 2014.

The Russo-Ukrainian war was a key issue at the 2014 Halifax International Security Forum. Canadian Minister of National Defence Rob Nicholson, who also held the forum's opening speech, in a panel discussion called on Russia to get out of Ukraine describing the situation there as "completely unacceptable". He emphasized the Canadian commitment to oppose the conflict and accused Russian President Vladimir Putin of ignorance. "It's certainly my hope and the hope of everyone that he does get the message", Nicholson declared. "We are not going to let up on this… Whether it takes five years or 50, the people of Ukraine deserve the freedom that they deserve, that they fought for", the minister promised. Nicholson's cabinet colleague, Justice Minister Peter MacKay, called it "telling" that none of the delegates from Russia were representing their government. In view of the Russo-Ukrainian war Estonian President Toomas Hendrik Ilves opposed Russian propaganda and warned that "many things that Europe often takes for granted are under threat today". Ilves also described the conflict's negative consequences for global nuclear disarmament as Ukraine in 1994 gave up its nuclear weapons in exchange of international security promises and "when it comes to guaranteeing their territorial integrity, nothing is done".

Less than a month after the terror attacks of Quebec and Ottawa, the forum's opening session addressed North American security. The session, moderated by Tom Clark, was recorded and was broadcast on The West Block, a Canadian Sunday political show. Minister Nicholson stated that Canada was willing to enter a more integrated common defense strategy with the US. This would not affect Canadian sovereignty, Nicholson emphasized.

From the US, nine members of Congress attended the forum. This largest congressional delegation ever to visit Canada was led by the Senators John McCain and Tim Kaine. At a forum panel examining America's role as a "indispensable superpower" McCain and Kaine confirmed their optimism about the future of the US. Both senators agreed that US President Barack Obama should have sought congressional authorization to conduct operations against ISIL. "You can't ask people to risk their lives, risk getting killed, seeing other folks getting killed or injured if Congress isn't willing to do the job to put their thumbprint on this and say, this is a national mission and worth it", Kaine said during the panel. "I totally agree with Tim, and I do think it's very important for the president to come over with the authorization that he wants", McCain added. Regarding the Keystone XL pipeline, Senator Kaine at the forum also explained why in the previous week he had voted against a Senate bill to approve the project due to environmental reasons.

Senator McCain, against the backdrop of the failing negotiations on the Iranian nuclear program in Vienna and its repeated extension, criticized the US diplomacy and drew parallels to North Korea. McCain told the audience that North Korea was in command of nuclear weapons and delivery systems and called this a "wake up call". The senator's statement was confirmed by General Charles H. Jacoby, outgoing commander of NORAD and US Northern Command, who referred to North Korea as a "practical threat" due to its nuclear and ballistic capabilities.

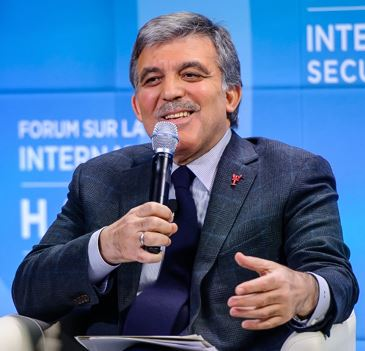
Abdullah Gül at HISF

Abdullah Gül, the former Turkish president, at the forum spoke about the persistent instability in the Middle East. "The key term to express the gravity of the situation in the region at present can be 'frustration'", Gül told the audience. He also responded to concerns related to interior developments in Turkey. It was Gül's first public appearance since departing the presidency.

On Saturday afternoon, the forum's president, Peter Van Praagh, issued a statement that the ISIL terror group was sending messages to the forum's staff and participants and also using #HISF2014, the forum's hashtag, to spread a propaganda video. The ISIL terror in the Middle East was debated in several Forum panels. Further topics of the 2014 Forum were African security issues and the situation of Hong Kong.

==== 2013 forum ====
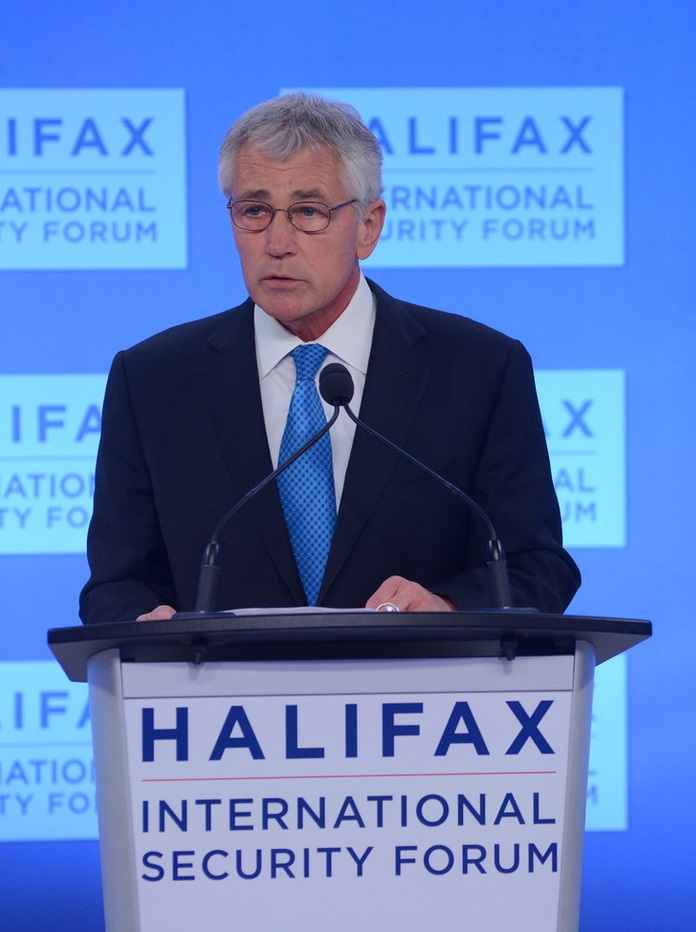
US Secretary of Defense Chuck Hagel at HISF 2013

Global climate change and its impact on the Arctic were key issues at the 2013 Halifax International Security Forum. In his keynote address, US Defense Secretary Chuck Hagel illustrated the rapid shift of the polar landscape and its consequences for international security. Hagel then announced the Pentagon's new Arctic strategy, which for the first time outlined how the US responds to the repercussions of climate change for the Arctic.

As the shrinking of Arctic ice opens up new waterways and potential energy resources, countries' increased interest in the region could potentially lead to rising international tensions, the Defense Secretary warned. Hagel called for more international cooperation in the Arctic to protect its environment and to keep it "peaceful, stable and free of conflict". He also emphasized his country's commitment "to detect, deter, prevent and defeat threats to the United States, and continue to exercise US sovereignty in and around Alaska". Speaking at a forum's panel, Rob Nicholson, Canadian Minister of National Defence, welcomed the Pentagon's new Arctic strategy and called it "entirely consistent" with Canada's approach. Nicholson described the Arctic as a "low-tension area" and emphasized Canada's efforts to foster more international cooperation in the region. Just prior to the launch of the 2013 Halifax Forum, Hagel and Nicholson signed the US-Canada Asia-Pacific Framework to increase their security cooperation in the Asia-Pacific region.

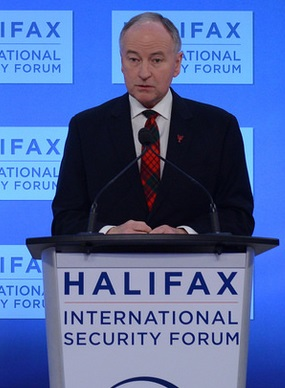
Minister of Defense Rob Nicholson at HISF 2013

Regarding the forthcoming withdrawal of the last Canadian forces from Afghanistan in March 2014, Minister Nicholson declared that "Canada has made a difference in Afghanistan". The minister also expressed his concerns about Afghan President Hamid Karzai's refusal to sign the Bilateral Security Agreement (BSA) with the US. Secretary Hagel emphasized the necessity of a signed and ratified BSA as a precondition for a US military presence in Afghanistan beyond 2014.

The 2013 Forum's Saturday night reception was interrupted by breaking news of the Geneva interim agreement on Iranian nuclear program and the broadcasting of US President Barack Obama's White House statement. The agreement was also the focus of a Halifax Forum meeting between Secretary Hagel and his Israeli counterpart Moshe Ya'alon.

During a panel discussion on the responsibility of Western nations to engage globally on political and humanitarian grounds, Liam Fox, former British Secretary of State for Defence, called for a "re-emphasizing" of NATO's political mission instead of staying focused only on the military side. He recalled that the Cold War was won by the Western allies. "And it was won—not just because we had military superiority or economic superiority—(but because) we had political and moral superiority and we were willing to say, not that we were different, but that we were better. That freedom would be better than oppression. Capitalism would be better than state control", Fox declared. In view of declining international engagement due to economic pressures, he called it an "absurdity" that NATO states were spending more of their GDP on debt interest repayments than on defense.

Alexander Vershbow, NATO's Deputy Secretary General, stressed the alliance's role as a force for global peace. In order to solve international issues, NATO needs to cooperate with other international organizations, Vershbow declared, also urging more assistance to the Syrian opposition. US Senator John McCain emphasized the importance of establishing humanitarian zones in war-torn countries such as Syria.

Speaking about international military interventions, Canadian Minister of Justice and Attorney General Peter MacKay described a kind of fatigue currently present in democratic societies, due to the losses in recent years. As for Canada, MacKay declared the country's willingness to maintain its high international presence moving forward.

==== 2012 forum ====
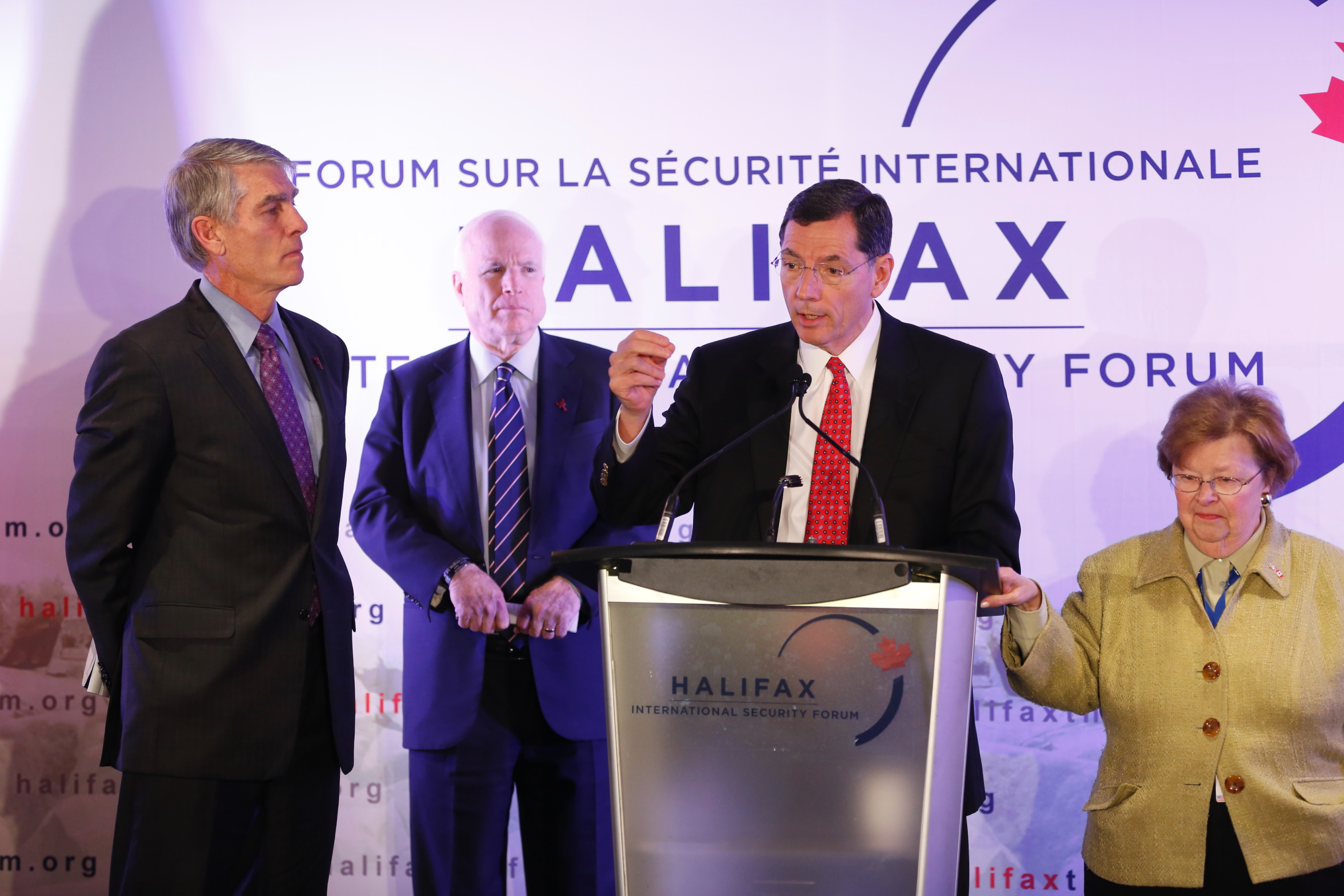
United States Senators Mark Udall, John McCain, John Barrasso, and Barbara Mikulski speak to members of the media at the Halifax International Security Forum 2012

The Halifax International Security Forum in November 2012 took place against the backdrop of the open military conflict between Israel and Hamas in Gaza. This conflict and the civil war in Syria were major topics of Forum debates. Canadian Defence Minister Peter MacKay stated that Israel had the right to defend itself against Hamas, but urged restraint in the conflict. Regarding Syria, MacKay called on Russia to help end the civil war. US Senators John McCain and Mark Udall called for a no-fly zone in Syria. McCain dismissed any talk of a potential US ground intervention given the lack of popular support for such s step by the American people. "Americans are war-weary", the Senator declared. During a panel discussion on the future of Afghanistan and Pakistan, Afghan politicians and business leaders described the situation in their country as "very, very vulnerable". According to Abdul Rahim Wardak, advisor to Afghan President Hamid Kazai and former defence minister, Afghanistan needed "a lot of resources and patience on the part of the international community". At a panel on technology and modern warfare, Vic Toews, Canadian Minister of Public Safety, declared that Canada was "as prepared as anyone else" to defend itself against cyberattacks. During the same panel, Minister MacKay announced plans to procure drones for the surveillance of Canada's Arctic territories.

==== 2011 forum ====
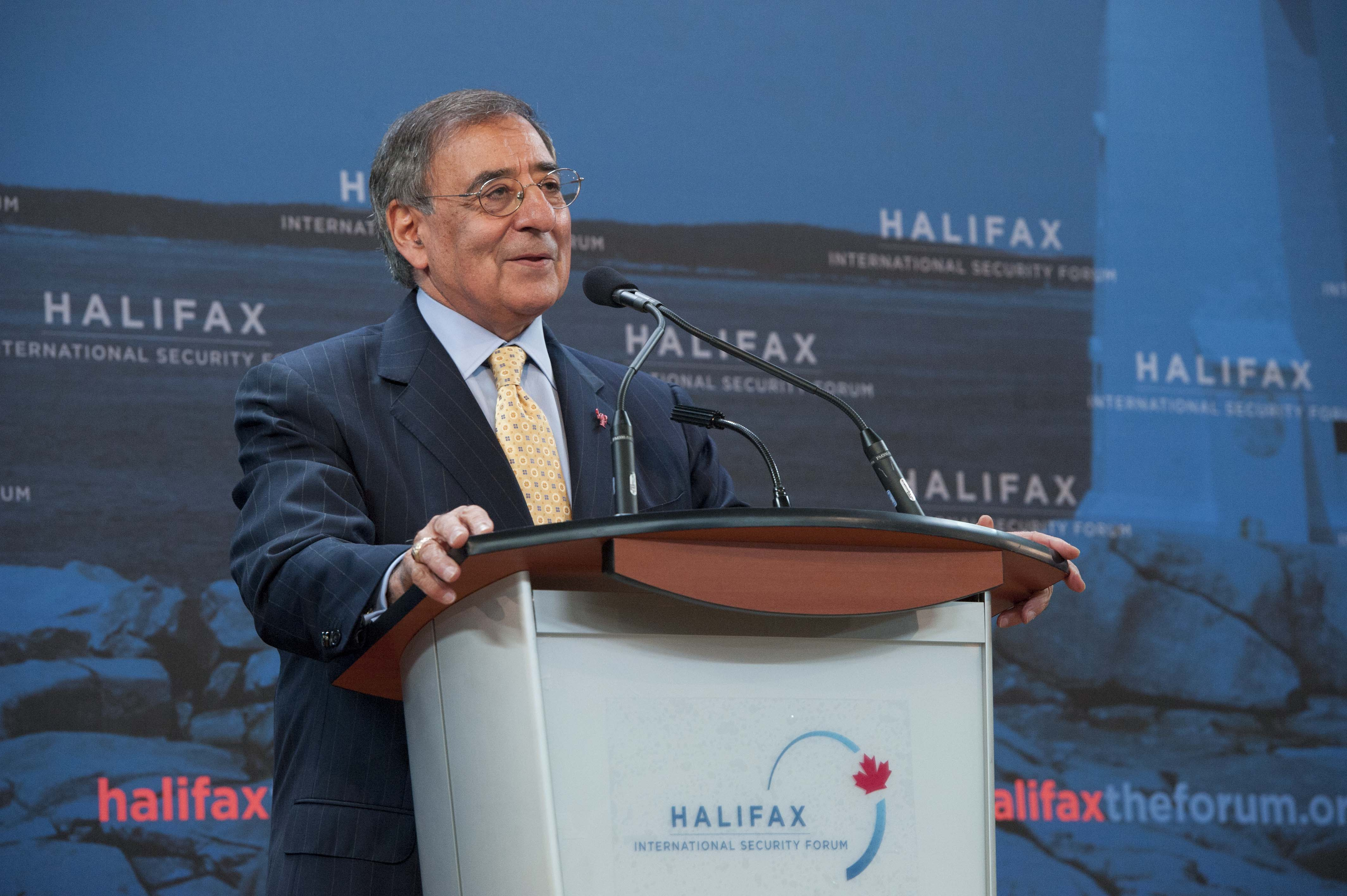
US Secretary of Defense Leon Panetta at the Halifax International Security Forum 2011

Leon Panetta, United States Secretary of Defense, gave the keynote speech at the Halifax Forum 2011. Panetta described the US as confronting "the fiscal realities of limited resources" and outlined the future of the US military "that, while smaller, is agile, flexible, deployable and technologically equipped to confront the threats of the future". Secretary Panetta also urged other countries to share in the burden of maintaining global security. In spite of budget pressures Panetta expressed his confidence in the funding of the multinational Joint Strike Fighter (F-35) program. Together with his US counterpart, Peter MacKay, Canadian Minister of National Defense, confirmed Ottawa's plan to buy 65 F-35 aircraft. Regarding the situation in Syria and Iran, two key issues for the forum, MacKay declared, that the NATO mission in Libya was no blueprint for similar interventions. "There's a danger in creating a scenario that says there is 'world police' that are going to start singling out countries and enforcing what those governments—legitimate or not—should be doing", MacKay told the forum's participants. Any international actions in Syria would need a UN Security Council resolution similar to the one on Libya, the Canadian defence minister added. He also expressed his hope that Russia and China would agree on economic sanctions towards Syria. Speaking in Halifax, Senator John McCain expressed his conviction that the "Arab Spring is a virus that will attack Moscow and Beijing".

==== 2010 forum ====
At the 2010 Halifax International Security Forum the US Senators John McCain and Lindsey Graham asked for Canadian troops staying in Afghanistan after 2011, the date of withdrawal, changing from a combat to a training role. Canadian Minister of National Defence, Peter MacKay, declared at the forum, that Canada was considering staying in Afghanistan with a training mission. At a forum panel on the Iranian nuclear conflict US Senator Graham called for a military strike on Iran to "neuter" the regime. Michèle Flournoy, Under Secretary of Defense for Policy, confirmed a new approach of the US Administration towards Iran, from an attempt to engage the Iranian government "toward a pressure track with the imposition of sanctions". Canadian Minister MacKay favored collective international sanctions against Iran and its nuclear program. Speaking at Halifax that same year, Janet Napolitano, United States Secretary of Homeland Security, emphasized the prominent role of regular citizens in thwarting terrorist attacks, and also commented on the recent Air Canada masked stowaway case, saying it raises concerns about a security breach that terrorists might exploit.

==== 2009 forum ====
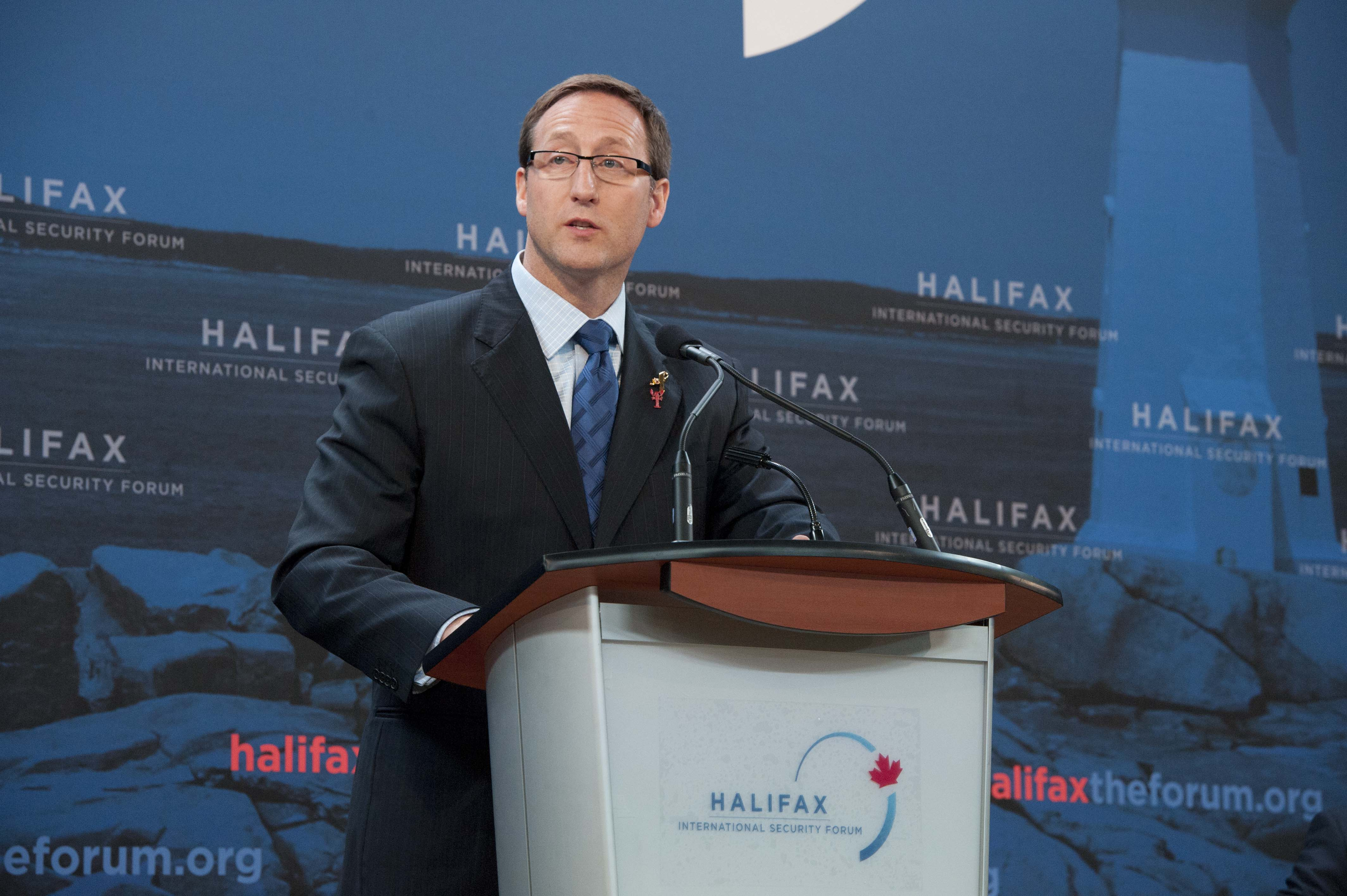
Minister of Defense Peter MacKay of Canada at the Halifax International Security Forum 2011

The situation in Afghanistan was a key issue of the inaugural Halifax Forum 2009. In his opening speech United States Secretary of Defense, Robert Gates, acknowledged the military engagement of Canada in Afghanistan, with over 2,800 deployed troops and more than 130 soldiers killed. Gates emphasized the key role of the Canadian military for the success in Afghanistan. The secretary warned the Afghan government of a reduction of financial assistance because of corruption. Gates urged the nations of the western hemisphere to increase their cooperation and collaboration to bolster security in the country. For the NATO troops in Afghanistan, US Senator John McCain opposed fixed exit dates before a military success. "The exit strategy is success", McCain declared, "It's when you succeed and start to draw down." On the conflict about the nuclear program of Iran, Ellen Tauscher, Under Secretary of State for Arms Control and International Security Affairs, urged the country to "engage" with the West and warned, "If persuasion doesn't work, pressure is going to have to be the next line of action." The future of the Arctic was also an issue of the 2009 forum.

=== Venue ===
The annual Forum is held in Halifax, capital of the Canadian province of Nova Scotia. Halifax is the largest population center in Atlantic Canada and serves as business hub of the region. Halifax Harbour is also one of the largest natural harbors in the world. The Canadian Forces Base Halifax is home port to the Atlantic Fleet of the Royal Canadian Navy and Canada's largest military installation. Halifax is a center of Canadian shipbuilding and of the aerospace and defense industry in Atlantic Canada.

=== Participants ===
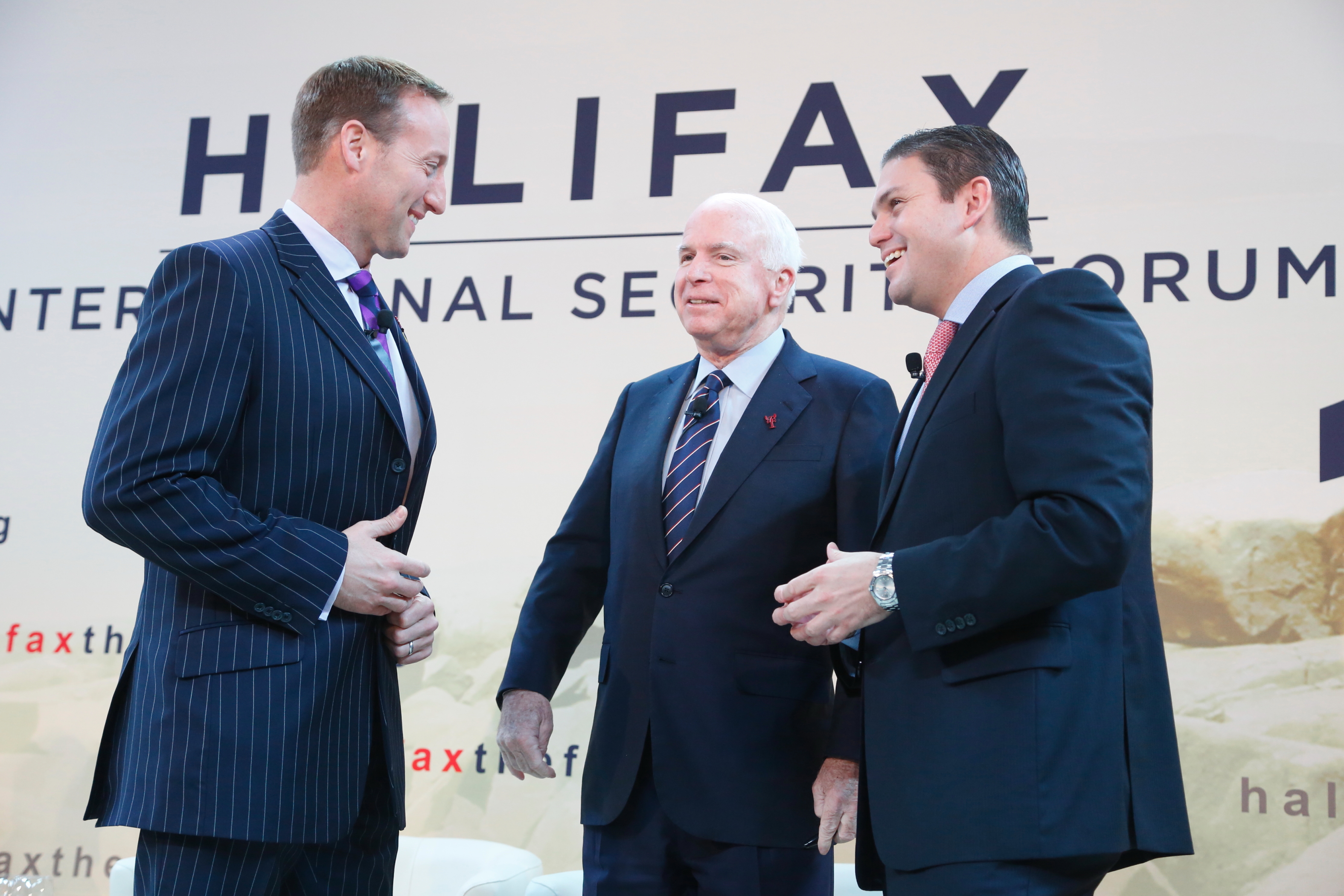
Canadian Minister of National Defence Peter MacKay, US Senator John McCain and Colombian Minister of National Defense Juan Carlos Pinzón Bueno at the Halifax International Security Forum 2012

The Halifax Forum is attended by international government and military officials, academic experts, authors and entrepreneurs. Prominent political participants include Ministers, Senators and Members of Parliament. The ministers included John Baird, Steven Blaney, Scott Brison, Kent Hehr, Peter MacKay, Rob Nicholson, Harjit Sajjan, and Vic Toews from Canada, as well as Chuck Hagel, Robert Gates, Leon Panetta, and Janet Napolitano from the United States. From Europe the ministers Michael Fallon from the United Kingdom, Karl-Theodor zu Guttenberg from Germany, Pieter De Crem from Belgium, Jeanine Hennis-Plasschaert from the Netherlands, Jean-Yves Le Drian from France, Pedro Morenés from Spain, Guy Parmelin from Switzerland, Milica Pejanović Đurišić from Montenegro, Hannes Hanso, Nikola Poposki and Zoran Jolevski from Macedonia, Gunnar Bragi Sveinsson from Iceland, Nicolai Wammen from Denmark, Haki Demolli from Kosovo, Tina Khidasheli from Georgia, Mimi Kodheli from Albania, Juozas Olekas from Lithuania, and Jüri Luik from Estonia are among previous Halifax Forum participants. Also, ministers Ehud Barak and Moshe Ya'alon from Israel, Juan Carlos Pinzón Bueno and Luis Carlos Villegas from Colombia, Salvador Cienfuegos Zepeda from Mexico, Rodrigo Hinzpeter from Chile, Wayne Mapp from New Zealand, Abdul Rahim Wardak from Afghanistan and Delfin Lorenzana from Philippines attended the forum.

In addition, United States Senators John Barrasso, Susan Collins, Chris Coons, Ted Cruz, Deb Fischer, Lindsey Graham, Tim Kaine, John McCain, Barbara Mikulski, Chris Murphy, Ben Sasse, Jeff Sessions, Jeanne Shaheen, Mark Udall together with Representatives Tom Cotton, Tulsi Gabbard, Adam Kinzinger, Mike Pompeo, Adam Schiff, Dan Sullivan, and Robert Wexler were also among the participants, as were Alison Redford, Pamela Wallin, Bernard Valcourt from Canada, and Liam Fox from the United Kingdom.

Former Prime Minister Mikhail Kasyanov of Russia, President Kolinda Grabar-Kitarović of Croatia, former President Abdullah Gül of Turkey, President Toomas Hendrik Ilves of Estonia, and Hashim Thaçi from Kosovo have also attended the forum.

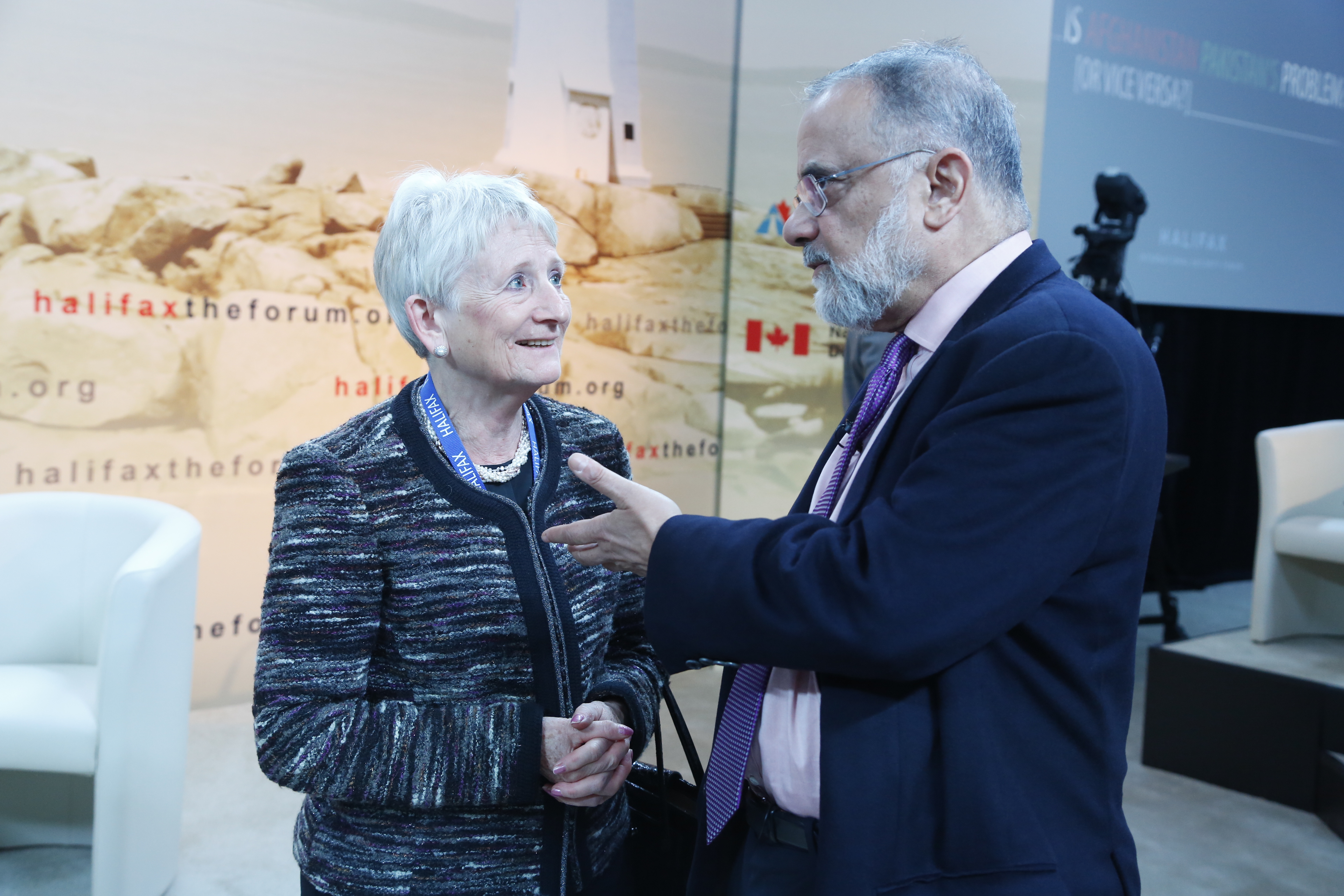
Pauline Neville-Jones and Ahmed Rashid at the Halifax International Security Forum 2012

Other government officials who came to the Halifax Forum include Stephen Breyer, Mark Carney, Greg Craig, Gary Doer, Michèle Flournoy, Rose Gottemoeller, Stephen Hadley, David Jacobson, Pauline Neville-Jones, Bob Paulson, Amrullah Saleh, Ellen Tauscher, Alexander Vershbow, and Robert O. Work.

Participating international military officials include Stéphane Abrial, John R. Allen Charles Bouchard, Haakon Bruun-Hanssen, Peter Devlin, Mark P. Fitzgerald, William E. Gortney, Frank J. Grass, Cecil Haney, Harry B. Harris Jr., Michelle Howard, Charles H. Jacoby Jr., John F. Kelly, Thomas J. Lawson, Joseph L. Lengyel, Jarmo Lindberg from Finland, Paul Maddison, Tom Middendorp, Neil Morisetti, Walter Natynczyk, Jean-Paul Paloméros, Petr Pavel, Stuart Peach, David G. Perkins, Victor E. Renuart, Michael S. Rogers, James G. Stavridis, Riho Terras from Estonia, Jonathan Vance, Ricardo Visaya, and James A. Winnefeld, Jr.

International think tank experts, journalists, and entrepreneurs participating in the Halifax Forum include Geneive Abdo, M. J. Akbar, Michael Auslin, David Bercuson, Rosa Brooks, Tom Clark, Steve Clemons, Roger Cohen, Raghida Dergham, Paula Dobriansky, Lyse Doucet, Jane Harman, Wolfgang Ischinger, Josef Joffe, Suat Kınıklıoğlu, Kathleen Koch, David J. Kramer, Kevin Newman, Natalie Nougayrède, Ahmed Rashid, Condoleezza Rice, Gideon Rose, David E. Sanger, Robin Shepherd, Janice Gross Stein, Frances Townsend, and Kurt Volker.

=== Peace With Women Fellowship ===
The Peace With Women Fellowship is a program launched by HFX in 2018. It is designed for senior female military officers from NATO and NATO-partner countries, aiming to equip them for future leadership positions and broaden their understanding of security.

The fellowship consists of a three-week executive study tour in Canada and the United States, concluding with participation in the annual Halifax International Security Forum. During the program, fellows meet with senior political, military, business, technology, and thought leaders. The itinerary includes visits to Washington, DC, Toronto, Colorado Springs, and Ottawa, covering a wide range of security-related topics.

As of 2023, the program has produced 68 alumnae, with 17 reaching the rank of general officer. The fellowship has gained support from senior civilian and military commanders in both Canada and the United States.

=== The John McCain Prize for Leadership in Public Service ===
The John McCain Prize for Leadership in Public Service is an annual award presented by HFX to individuals or groups who have demonstrated exceptional leadership in pursuing human justice. The prize is based on principles that reflect John McCain's life and career:

- Unwavering support for human freedom
- Commitment to democracy, opportunity, and peace
- Courage in confronting oppression and undemocratic regimes
- Celebration of the human spirit in overcoming adversity
- Honor in pursuing goals beyond self-interest

The selection process is managed by a committee comprising the HFX Board of Directors and President. This committee evaluates potential candidates throughout the year. The prize is announced and presented during the annual Halifax International Security Forum each November, typically on Saturday morning.

==== Recipients ====
2018: The people of Lesbos for their efforts to save refugees
2019: The citizen protesters in Hong Kong
2020: Tsai Ing-wen, president of Taiwan, for her resistance to aggression from Beijing
2021: The Afghan Female Tactical Platoon
2022: The women of Ukraine (accepted by the First Lady of Ukraine Olena Zelenska)
2023: The people of Israel (accepted by Lital Lesham of Brothers and Sisters in Arms)
2024: Vladimir Kara-Murza, a Kremlin critic and Pulitzer Prize-winning writer

=== HFXConversations ===
HFXConversations is HFX's online publication. HFX Conversations is dedicated to bringing ideas and opinions from democratic leaders to the wider public and will publish essays and interviews when they need to be published. Previous contributors include Olena Zelenska, Alar Karis, Fetr Fiala, and Issac Herzog.

=== 15@15: Youth Building Democracy ===
15@15: Youth Building Democracy is a global competition launched by HFX in 2023 to mark the 15th annual Halifax International Security Forum. The program aims to engage youth in HFX's mission of strengthening strategic cooperation among democracies.

The competition is open to individuals who are 15 years old, and requires applicants to submit a 15-second video about one positive change they would like to see within the next 15 years to make their world more secure. Winners of the competition receive an invitation to attend the Halifax International Security Forum.

HFX President Peter Van Praagh stated that the program is "part of building a new era for democracy, opportunity and peace with youth leading the way." The initiative aims to give young people a voice in shaping policies that will affect their future.

== See also ==
- Munich Security Conference
- Nuclear Security Summit
- Yalta European Strategy
