= Japheth J. Omojuwa =

Nigerian blogger, author, public speaker and social media expert

Japheth Omojuwa
- Born: 3 October 1984 (age 41); Lagos, Lagos State, Nigeria
- Education: Federal University of Agriculture, Abeokuta (FUNAAB)
- Occupations: Media entrepreneur, public speaker, author, social media influencer.

Japheth Joshua Omojuwa (born 3 October 1984) is a Nigerian writer, political commentator and social media expert. A columnist with The Punch newspaper, Leadership newspaper and Naij.com, Omojuwa's articles have appeared on CNN, This Day and other platforms. His works have been translated into German, French, Portuguese and Greek.

== Career ==
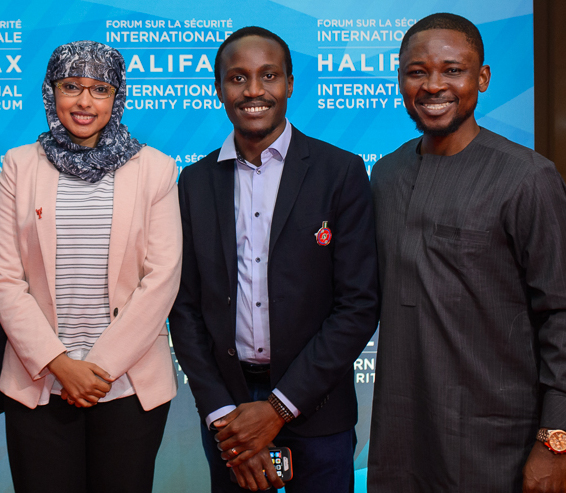
Omojuwa (right) at the Halifax International Security Forum 2017

Omojuwa has been a regular guest at several conferences and symposiums.

The leadership of the African Union invited Omojuwa in 2014 to be part of the Africa Re-imagination Creative Hub (ARCH) to fashion an agenda for Africa 2063 project. He participated as a panelist at a side event during the 2013 United Nations General Assembly in New York City where he spoke on the need to use data and facts as tools in activism and policy making. He was also appointed as a board member of Halifax.

Omojuwa's pieces have appeared on several online and print mediums including Metropole Magazine, Opinion Nigeria, Sahara Reporters, BBC, The Financial Times, ThisDay and Naij. In 2019 Omojuwa published the book Digital: The New Code of Wealth.

== Controversies ==
Omojuwa was involved in a protracted battle with Arik Air after losing an iPad while on board one of its domestic flights in July 2012. In addition, a new iPad was purchased for Omojuwa.

On 4 March 2017, South African border police authorities held Omojuwa alongside a Nigerian student for several hours. He was released after intervention from Nigerian authorities. In a tweet he wrote that "South African border officials are holding me because of my Nigerian passport".

In February 2016, Omojuwa delved into an intense controversy with Ben Bruce on Twitter when the latter criticized President Buhari for his statement about Nigerians being unwelcome in Britain because of crime.

Omojuwa's PR firm, Alpha Reach, reportedly hired around forty Nigerian influencers as part of a campaign to promote the release of Alex Saab, a Colombian businessman fighting extradition to the United States on money laundering charges.

On 14 April 2021, a former Minister of Education, Obiageli Ezekwesili, petitioned Nigeria's acting Inspector General of Police, Usman Alkali, requesting him to investigate Omojuwa for alleged fraudulent use of her name and identity as a director of his PR firm, Alpha Reach Limited. Mrs Ezekwesili's request followed Omojuwa's claim that she consented before enlisting her as a director of the PR firm, allegedly paid to promote a social media campaign for the release of Venezuelan businessman Alex Saab.

== Awards and nominations ==
In 2012, YNaija named him one of the most influential young Nigerians under 35, with writer Ifreke Inyang describing him as "king of the click." Omojuwa was named by Credit Suisse Bulletin as one of the 50 Movers and Shakers of Africa in 2015. In June 2016, Omojuwa was named the Best Twitter Personality Of The Year in the annual African Bloggers Awards. The 2016 African Bloggers Awards were sponsored by the Bill & Melinda Gates Foundation.

== International Visitors Leadership Programme ==
In August 2016, Omojuwa completed the International Visitor Leadership Program (IVLP) in the United States. The International Visitors Leadership Programme, which started in 1940, is a professional exchange program funded by the U.S. Department of State's Bureau of Educational and Cultural Affairs.

== British Council Chevening Fellowship ==
Omojuwa was in 2019 awarded a British Council Chevening Fellowship, leading to a master's degree in Behaviour Change at the University College London.

== Halifax International Security Forum ==
In July 2021, Omojuwa was appointed to the board of Halifax International Security Forum, making him the first Nigerian and African to sit on the board of the global think-tank.

== Endorsements ==
In August 2016, global cognac brand Rémy Martin announced Omojuwa as a brand influencer for its One Life/Live Them campaign in Nigeria.

== See also ==
- List of Nigerian bloggers
