= CRINK =

China, Russia, Iran, & North Korea

CRINK: China, Russia, Iran, North Korea

CRINK (China, Russia, Iran, and North Korea) (Note: Also known as the "axis of upheaval", "axis of anger", "New Axis of Evil", "axis of autocracies", "quartet of chaos", or the "deadly quartet".) is an acronym coined in 2023 by Western analysts to refer to the grouping of China, Russia, Iran, and North Korea in what is perceived as a "loose alliance" of anti-Western nations. Within the proposed concept of the Second Cold War, this grouping is considered rival to NATO powers. Other analysts have expressed doubt that the grouping of countries constitutes a coherent alliance.

== Term ==
At the 2023 Halifax International Security Forum on November 17, 2023, president Peter Van Praagh introduced the acronym "CRINK" during his opening remarks:

Isolating Russia from the international community brought the other authoritarians to Putin's aid. Now China and Russia and Iran and North Korea, we are calling them the CRINKs, are working to dismantle the global order.

— Peter Van Praagh, 2023

According to Politico, a wide range of Axis-related concerns were shared by Halifax Forum participants and remained a central theme throughout the event. The term was used by the forum, with two of its plenary sessions being titled "Victory in Ukraine = Message to the CRINKs" and "Never Mind the BRICS, Here's the CRINKs".

=== International usage ===
After the 2023 Forum, the term "CRINK" was picked up by international media outlets. It has been adopted internationally by news outlets in Chile, Germany, France, Italy, Poland, Switzerland, Spain, and Belgium. The term "CRINK" has also been mentioned in reports concerning the Russian invasion of Ukraine and the Middle Eastern crisis, and is widely used in discussions regarding the rise of anti-Western sentiment.

=== Related terms ===
US president George W. Bush coined the term Axis of Evil in 2002 to refer to Saddam Hussein's Iraq, Iran and North Korea.

The term Neo-Authoritarian Bloc was coined by Gerard McDermott in November 2022 and further defined in April 2023. Aside from China, Russia, Iran and North Korea, he included Venezuela, Belarus and Myanmar, based on what he considered consistently high level of collaboration and exchanges since the beginning of the 2020s. McDermott has argued that the support received by Russia and Myanmar from the bloc has led to both regimes being able to endure the conflicts in Ukraine and Myanmar, respectively. McDermott has also discussed the role that the coalescence of these seven authoritarian states has had on conflicts that were previously frozen, such as Taiwan, South Korea, Bosnia and Herzegovina, and the Essequibo region of Guyana.

The term Axis of Upheaval was coined in April 2024 by foreign policy analysts Richard Fontaine and Andrea Kendall-Taylor, as part of the Center for a New American Security United States-based national security think tank. The term has been used by numerous Western foreign policy analysts, military officials, and international groups. Fontaine picked the phrase to emphasize the alleged shared desire to uproot Western influence and values without using language that was "too overbearing", such as Bush's Axis of Evil, or "axis of autocracy".

Among more neutral terminology, NATO policy planning head Benedetta Berti expressed that she preferred to use the phrase "strategic convergence" instead of "axis" when describing a coalition of adversary nations. On the other hand, the U.S. think tank Institute for the Study of War has described the grouping, in June 2025, as an "Adversary Entente".

== Background ==
The roots of cooperation among the nations stretch back decades during the onset of the Cold War, based on the divide between the First World and Second World. The Soviet Union represented the lead superpower of the latter, providing assistance to and sharing communist, anti-Western philosophies with the People's Republic of China and North Korea.

While these nations have generally remained on neutral or good terms since the dissolution of the Soviet Union, their alliance intensified significantly following the Russian invasion of Ukraine and the West's response in the form of economic sanctions and military aid to Ukraine.

In 2021, Clifford May described Russia, China and Iran as neo-imperialist powers who "seek to restore what they consider their rightful realms, and all see the U.S. as their biggest obstacle. It's on this basis that they now have a flourishing alliance". Discussing Russian neo-imperialism in Ukraine, Orlando Figes wrote in 2022 that "we can see a new type of empire arising in Eurasia, uniting countries with historic grievances against the West". He said that "ideas of a nationalist, socially conservative, anti-Western and religious character ... underpin dictatorships in Russia, China, and Iran".

== Characteristics ==
While CRINK is not a formal union or alliance, it is generally united by a shared opposition to what it calls U.S. hegemony and the Western-led international order. The countries have dramatically increased their economic and military cooperation while coordinating their diplomatic, information, and security efforts, operating as a loose coalition of like-minded states in resistance to economic or ideological pressure from Western nations. Collectively and individually, the CRINK members are globally known for their countries' authoritarian leadership, their opposition to the West, and involvement in military conflicts. The countries have no formal alliance, but are seemingly united by common interests akin to the motto of "the enemy of my enemy is my friend." Collectively, they share the goal of creating a multipolar world order that diminishes U.S. global dominance, which includes resisting "external meddling in their internal affairs, the expansion of U.S. alliances, the stationing of American nuclear weapons abroad, and the use of coercive sanctions".

=== Autocracy ===
All four states have been described as autocratic or authoritarian with extensive state propaganda campaigns, while Russia, Iran, China and North Korea have also been described as seeking to challenge the post-1945 world order. In addition, North Korea is one of the few remaining personalist dictatorships, as well as the oldest surviving dictatorship in the world, with its own cult of personality.

== Countries ==
Flag	Country	Capital	Area (km^{2})	Population (2025)	Density (/km^{2})	GDP per cap. (PPP)	HDI	Currency	Top leader	Official languages
People's Republic of China	China; People's Republic of China	Beijing	9,596,961 (Note: UN figure for mainland China, which excludes Hong Kong, Macau, and Taiwan. It also excludes the Trans-Karakoram Tract (5,180 km^{2} (2,000 sq mi)), Aksai Chin (38,000 km^{2} (15,000 sq mi)) and other territories in dispute with India. The total area of China is listed as 9,572,900 km^{2} (3,696,100 sq mi) by the Encyclopædia Britannica.)	1,404,890,000	147	28,978	0.797	Renminbi (Chinese yuan, ¥) (CNY)	General Secretary of the Chinese Communist Party Xi Jinping	Standard Chinese written in simplified characters, see also: languages of China
Russia	Russia; Russian Federation	Moscow	17,075,400	146,028,325	8.4	49,383	0.832	Russian rouble (₽) (RUB)	President of Russia Vladimir Putin	Russian, see also: Languages of Russia
	Iran; Islamic Republic of Iran	Tehran	1,648,195	92,417,681	52	19,957	0.799	Iranian rial (Rl) (IRR)	Supreme Leader of Iran Mojtaba Khamenei	Persian
	North Korea; Democratic People's Republic of Korea (DPRK)	Pyongyang	120,538	26,298,666	212	1,800	0.766	North Korean won (₩) (KPW)	General Secretary of the Workers' Party of Korea Kim Jong un	Korean

== Discussion ==
=== Impact ===
The rapid development of CRINK worked to undermine the effectiveness of Western sanctions and export controls such as those against Russia, eroded U.S. military advantages in key regions including the Middle East, and presented increased challenges to international norms and institutions. Moreover, the axis's actions have emboldened other anti-Western states and actors, contributing to a more unstable global environment.

Foreign policy analyst Andrea Kendall-Taylor believed that the resulting influence of the axis of nations is pushing transformation of the current "international system" into one characterized by two increasingly organized orders with opposing values and regional interests, a shift she predicted is likely to give rise to greater global instability and initiation of conflict. She noted several instances of increasing worldwide conflict related to the coalition's cooperation. These included increased regional conflicts such as Azerbaijan's renewed invasion and reintegration of Nagorno-Karabakh, threats to Guyana from Venezuela, increasing tension between Kosovo and Serbia, and an increase in coups in several African nations. She predicted that opportunistic aggression, such as Russia attacking Europe while the United States is involved in a war against China, could be a future driver of worldwide conflict.

=== Analysis ===
American diplomat and historian Philip Zelikow stated that the new "Axis" represented the third time in recent history that the United States faced a "purposeful set of powerful adversaries in a rapidly changing and militarized period of history, short of all-out war." The prior instances included the Axis Powers of Fascist Italy, Nazi Germany, and Imperial Japan from 1937 to 1941, and the beginning of the Cold War against the Soviet Union and China from 1948 to 1962. He analyzed that the leaders of the current Axis of Upheaval share characteristics with leaders of these earlier periods such as Adolf Hitler, Joseph Stalin, and Mao Zedong; viewing themselves as historical figures operating in isolated environments separate from dissenting views and pressures. He stated that this isolation shared by the four nations' leaders can lead to decisions that may seem irrational to outside observers, with autocratic state propaganda further censoring dissenting viewpoints while characterizing other international orders as existential threats to them and their culture that requires conflict and sacrifice to repel.

=== Challenges ===
Despite their growing cooperation, historical distrust from prior events exist, such as the Soviet Union's 1941 invasion of Iran, China's apprehension to North Korea's militant aggression, and a border dispute between Russia and China that ended in 2004. Current competing interests between the nations include disputes between Russia and China over control in Central Asia and competition between Iran and Russia for Asian oil markets. Furthermore, the axis does not seem to have a coherent positive vision for a new global order, and its members remain economically interdependent with the West to varying degrees, making direct opposition to ultimatums issued more difficult to justify. Despite this, political scientist Hal Brands remarked that their alliance forged from their mutual disdain for the "existing order" resembled many of history's "most destructive alliances", which were made from rough agreements to band together against a greater opposing order or alliance with "little coordination and even less affection".

Kelly Grieco, a senior researcher at the Stimson Center, argued that "the Axis of Upheaval was always more Washington's imagination than reality". She said that while the four countries had a common adversary, "these countries share limited interests and the political cohesion among them as a grouping is weak". North Korea expert Andrei Lankov said "the much-discussed idea of authoritarian solidarity is even more fictional than the solidarity of democracies", noting that North Korea failed to offer condolences, personally blame Donald Trump or offer much diplomatic support to Iran following the assassination of Ali Khamenei.

During the 2026 Iran war, this difference went beyond diplomatic rhetoric to material support: China provided Iran with commercial satellite imagery and dual-use missile and drone components, while Russia provided real-time targeting intelligence on U.S. forces along with defense agreements for helicopter missile launchers. However, North Korea did not provide any weapons or reconstitution assistance to Tehran, according to South Korea's National Intelligence Service.

=== Western response ===
In response to this emerging threat, Western nations, led by the United States, have increased their focus on countering the collective challenge posed by the axis, which involved efforts to strengthen existing alliances and partnerships. In 2024, NATO reaffirmed its security commitments in unstable regions such as in Southeast Asia, and called for increased defense spending and diplomatic engagement to match increased cooperation from potentially destabilizing unions. However, rising populism and political polarization in the European Union, the United Kingdom and the United States threaten to undermine unity in the alliance.

Foreign policy analyst Andrea Kendall-Taylor argued that defeating Russia in Ukraine would be crucial to weakening the nations' ability to cause destabilization. She also believed that the U.S. should not deprioritize Russian aggression towards Ukraine and Europe while primarily focusing on China's South China Sea dispute due to both conflicts being connected. She stated that Europe needed to develop a stronger military and push for a greater emphasis on foreign policy so that the U.S. could address different global conflicts evenly without its resources and attention being stretched too thin. General Sir Roly Walker corroborated these statements, stating that the United Kingdom needed to "double the lethality of its army" in three years to prepare for conflict with the CRINK nations.

== See also ==
- Alliance of Sahel States
- BRICS
- Collective Security Treaty Organization
- Commonwealth of Independent States
- Shanghai Cooperation Organization
- China and the Russian invasion of Ukraine
- Iran and the Russian invasion of Ukraine
- North Korea and the Russian invasion of Ukraine
- Second Cold War
- Jakarta–Peking Axis
- Axis of Resistance, an informal Iran-led military coalition that operates across West Asia
- Outposts of tyranny, a term used by Condolezza Rice to refer to combinations of China, Cuba, Iran, Myanmar, North Korea, and Zimbabwe
- Troika of tyranny, a term used by John R. Bolton to refer to left-wing authoritarian Latin American countries Cuba, Nicaragua, and Venezuela
- United States foreign adversaries
