= Jonathan Tepperman =

American journalist, writer and editor

- Born: Windsor, Ontario, Canada
- Education: Yale University (BA); University of Oxford (MA); New York University (LLM)
- Occupations: Journalist, political commentator, author, editor

Jonathan Tepperman is an author, journalist, and expert on international affairs. He is currently Vice President for the International Program at the Carnegie Corporation of New York. Prior to joining Carnegie, Tepperman was a Senior Fellow at the George W. Bush Institute and the editor in chief of the institute's publication, The Catalyst. From 2017 to 2020, he was editor-in-chief of Foreign Policy magazine. Before that, he served as the managing editor of Foreign Affairs, and before that, as deputy editor of Newsweek International. His first book, The Fix, published in 2017, tells the stories of how countries around the world have solved some of their most difficult challenges.

== Early life and education ==
Born and raised in Canada, Tepperman lives in Brooklyn with his family. Tepperman is Jewish.

Tepperman has a BA in English Literature from Yale University and law degrees from the University of Oxford and New York University.

== Career ==
After studying law and starting his career freelancing in the Middle East, Tepperman joined Foreign Affairs, the magazine published by the Council on Foreign Relations, in 1998 under Fareed Zakaria. He spent several years at the magazine as a junior editor before moving on to Newsweek in 2006. There, he was deputy editor for the international edition, ran at various times the Asia, Europe, Africa, Middle East, and Latin America sections, and wrote multiple cover stories, opinion pieces, and a style column. In 2011, Tepperman returned to Foreign Affairs as its managing editor, a position he held until 2017, when he was named Foreign Policy's editor-in-chief.

He has also worked in political-risk consulting and as a speechwriter for Morris B. Abram, a former U.S. Ambassador to the UN Human Rights Council.

Tepperman writes for a range of publications. In 2013, he was a guest columnist for the International New York Times (formerly the International Herald Tribune). He has also published analytic essays, profiles, Op-Eds, interviews, and book reviews in The New York Times and New York Times Magazine, The Washington Post, The Wall Street Journal, The Atlantic, The New Republic, and many other newspapers and magazines. He is the co-editor of three books: The U.S. vs Al Qaeda: A History of the War on Terror (2011), The Clash of Ideas: The Ideological Battles That Made the Modern World and Will Shape the Future (2011), and Iran and the Bomb: Solving the Persian Puzzle (2012).

He is a frequent media commentator on international affairs, appearing on CNN, MSNBC, the BBC, Fox News, NPR, Globo, and other networks, as well as radio, including The Brian Lehrer Show and The Diane Rehm Show.

Tepperman regularly conducts interviews with global leaders for Foreign Policy, Foreign Affairs, and the Halifax International Security Forum. Recent interviewees include Syrian President Bashar al-Assad, Japanese Prime Minister Shinzo Abe, Brazilian President Luiz Inacio Lula da Silva, Mexican President Enrique Peña Nieto, Turkish President Abdullah Gül, Israeli Prime Minister Ehud Barak, and US Senator John McCain.

In 2016, Tepperman delivered a TED Talk on the risky politics of progress.

In 2021, Tepperman delivered a seminar, in conjunction with the International Republican Institute (IRI) titled China and the Global Fight for Democracy. It featured many speakers, including Senator Dan Sullivan of Alaska, Congressmen Adam Kinzinger of Illinois and Tom Malinowski of New Jersey, IRI officials (Senior Advisor David O. Shullman and President Daniel Twining) and academic experts Emmanuel Matambo, a Senior Researcher at the University of Johannesburg Centre for African-China Studies and Nadège Rolland, a Senior Fellow of Political and Security Affairs at the National Bureau of Asian Research.

Tepperman is a member of the Council on Foreign Relations and a fellow of the New York Institute for the Humanities.

== The Fix ==
In September 2016, Tepperman published The Fix: How Nations Survive and Thrive in a World in Decline. The book reveals often-overlooked good news stories in public policy, identifying ten pervasive and seemingly impossible challenges—including immigration reform, economic stagnation, political gridlock, corruption, and Islamic terrorism—and shows that, contrary to the general consensus, “each of these problems has a solution, and not just a theoretical one... They’ve all been tried, and they work. The trick is knowing where to look for them.”

The New York Times Book Review called it “An indispensable handbook. . . . Smart and agile. . . . The timing of this book could not be better. . . . Tepperman goes into impressive detail in each case study and delivers assessments in clear, pared-down prose.” The book was on the Financial Times “Best Business Books of 2016 Longlist” and was a Kirkus Starred Review.

== Support for George Floyd protests ==
On June 14, 2020, Tepperman, in the capacity of editor-in-chief of Foreign Policy, sent an e-mail to subscribers to the publication promoting support for "social justice". The message begins with the statement "George Floyd’s killing in Minneapolis police custody on May 25 has sparked an urgent national and global conversation about racism and how to address it. This discussion is long overdue.", and ends with "We are all in this together, and only together can we drive the necessary change."
