= Peter Van Praagh =

Foreign policy analyst

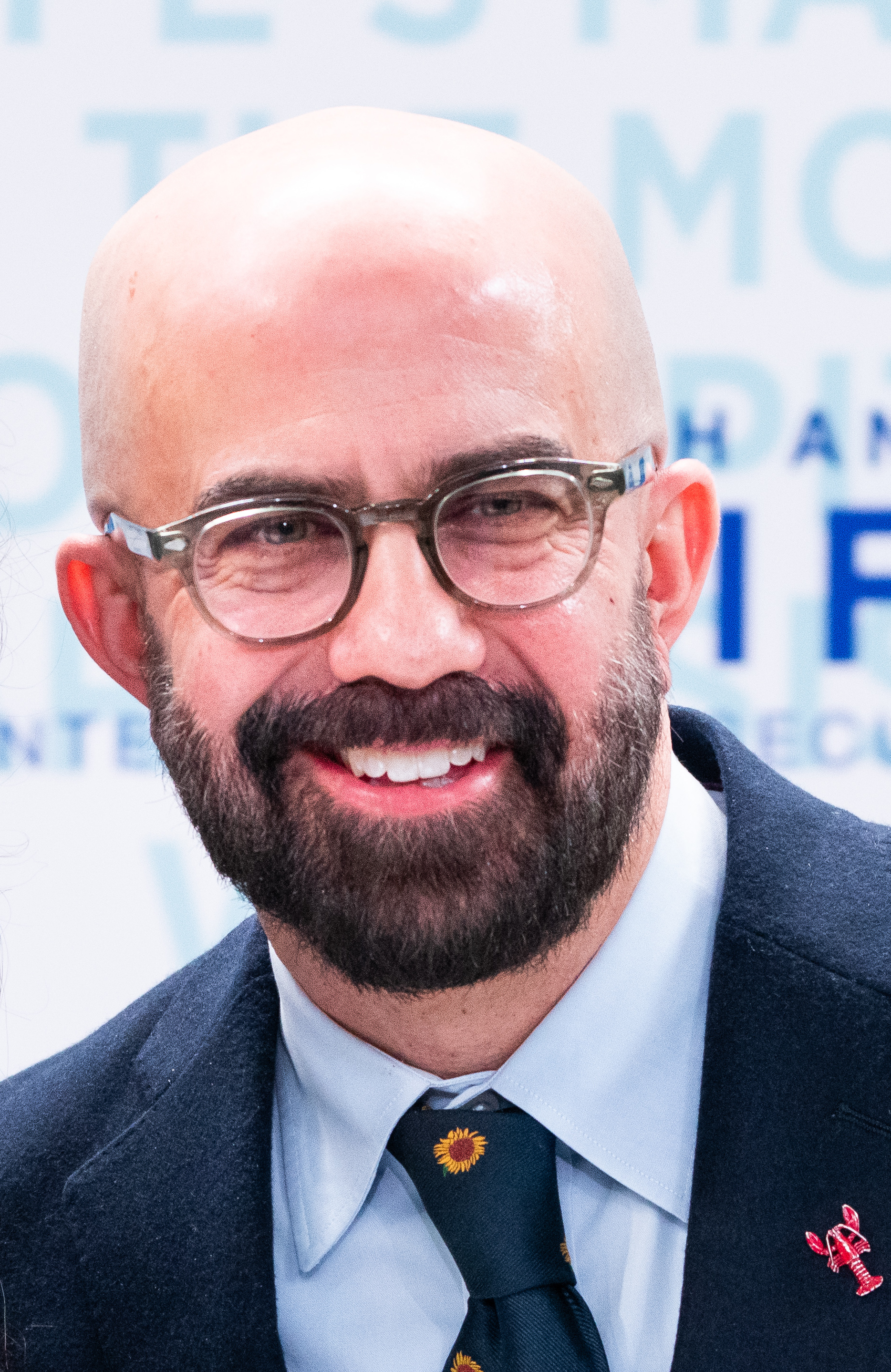
Van Praagh in 2023

Peter Van Praagh is a Canadian foreign and security policy advisor. He is the president of the Halifax International Security Forum, which he founded in 2009 within the German Marshall Fund. Since 2011, the forum is independent as HFX, a Washington, D.C.–based non-profit organization.

== Education ==
Van Praagh graduated from the University of Toronto and the London School of Economics.

== Career ==
Van Praagh was director for the National Democratic Institute (NDI) in Azerbaijan and Turkey. He also served as a senior director of the German Marshall Fund of the United States, and as deputy vice president of the National Endowment for Democracy. From 2006 to 2007, Van Praagh was a senior policy advisor to Canadian Foreign Minister Peter MacKay.

In 2009, Van Praagh established the Halifax International Security Forum, an annual summit for international government and military officials, politicians and experts, held in Halifax, Nova Scotia, Canada. Van Praagh coined CRINK, an acronym that stands for the authoritarian states China, Russia, Iran, North Korea, at the 2023 Halifax International Security Forum.

Van Praagh is on the Board of Directors of Temple Micah in Washington, D.C.

== Private life ==
Van Praagh is married with three children.
