= Rubber mask =

Facial disguise

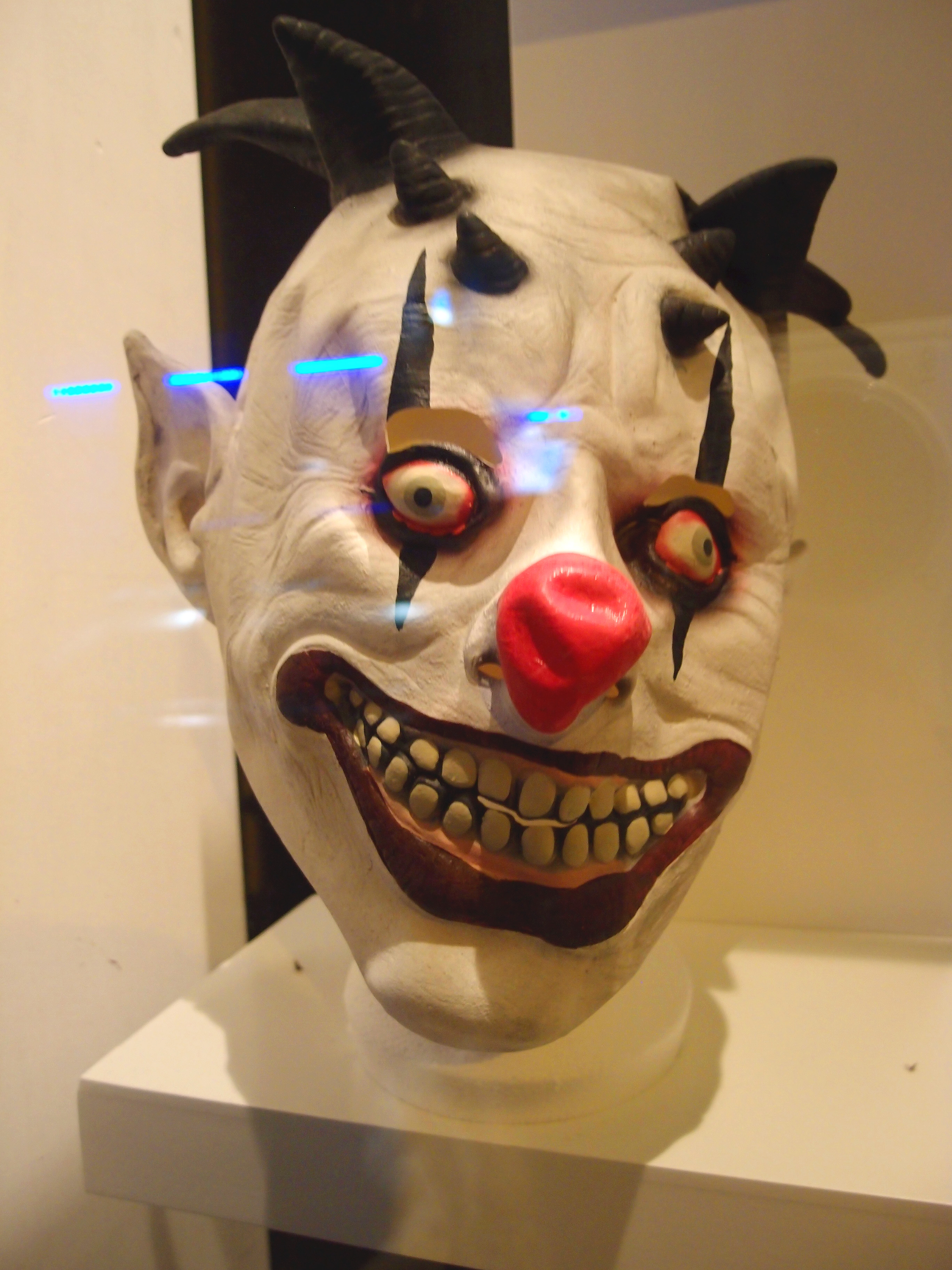
A rubber clown mask

A rubber mask is one made of rubber such as latex or silicone, or a soft plastic like polyvinyl chloride, as a form of theatrical makeup or disguise. Typically, such masks are designed to be pulled over the head, or cover only the wearer's face and are supported in the back by ties or a strip of elastic. Rubber masks are commonly associated with Halloween costumes, when they may be called Halloween masks.

== History ==
In 1938, Don Post, also known as "The Godfather of Halloween", had a significant role in coming up with some of the very first over-the-head latex masks and became a staple in the history of rubber masks and Halloween merchandising, creating and selling carnival masks that were lightweight and held their shape.

In the 1970s, Don Post Studios created licensed masks for franchises such as Planet of the Apes, Star Wars and the Universal Classic Monsters.

In the early 1960s, his son Don Post Jr. took over the company, allowing it to take focus on the Halloween/horror industry.

In 2003, SPFX masks was founded, creating the first silicone masks.

== Materials ==
Masks can be made in a number of materials, depending on the intended purpose. Factors such as movement, weight, color, or design will determine what material the mask is cast in.

=== Foam latex ===
Foam latex is commonly used as a material for prosthetic makeup because of its light weight and flexibility. For creature suits that require facial movement, foam latex may be used as a skin to go over the animatronic components for lifelike movement and expressions, such as the mask developed by Stan Winston Studios for Predator.

=== Latex ===
Latex is the most ubiquitous material for commercially available masks, due to it being a cheaper rubber making it a much more affordable material to produce. Similarly, the process for creating a latex mask is less complicated than that of a silicone mask. Due to the limitations of the material, latex masks are less flexible and expressive than silicone.

=== Silicone ===
For more professionally made masks, silicone is likely to be the rubber of choice due to its flesh-like, translucent qualities and its ability to "hug" the wearer's face which allows it to move along with different expressions. Silicone tends to be much higher in price, but has a much more realistic appearance and texture. Because of the expressive nature of the masks, they can serve as an alternative to prosthetic makeup, saving time and money on a production.

=== Urethane ===
Urethane is often used in the construction of superhero costumes for film and TV productions for its strength and flexibility, allowing for pieces that are thicker than latex but stronger than silicone.

=== Vinyl ===
Polyvinyl chloride is typically used for lower end Halloween masks, and is also a common choice for licensed masks, with Don Post Studios beginning to produce vinyl masks in the 1960s. These masks are often more rigid and thicker than latex.

== Production ==
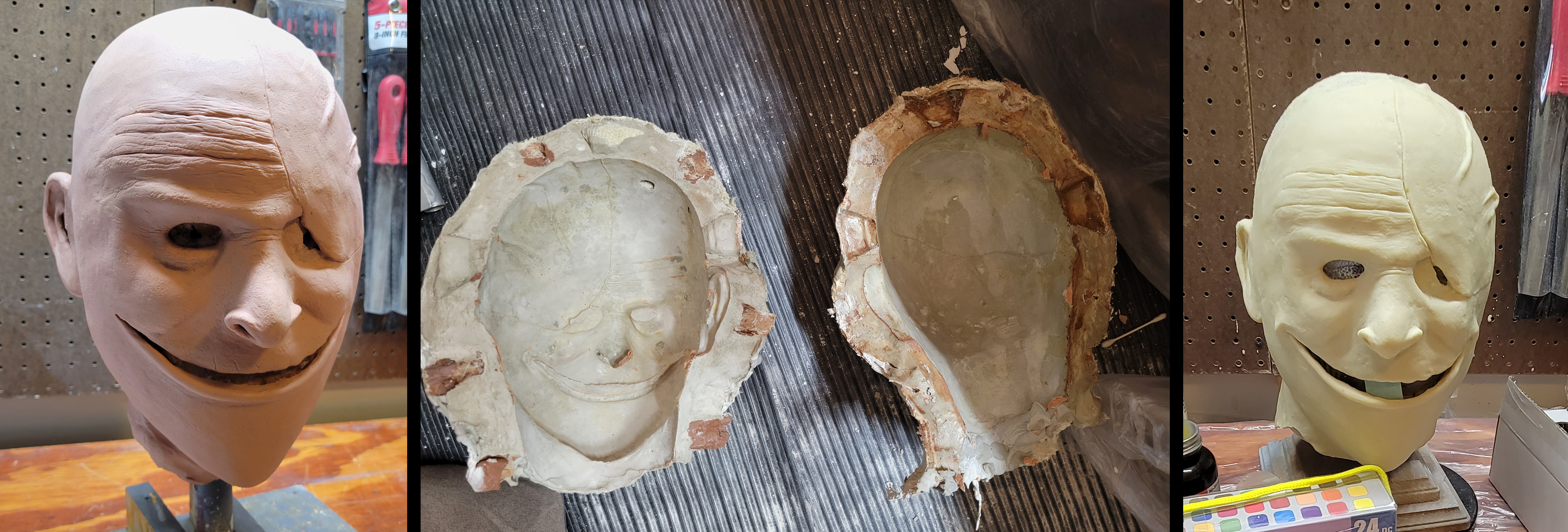
The basic steps of making a rubber mask. First a clay sculpture is made, followed by a negative mold. Latex is then poured into the mold and cured, then trimmed and painted.

Rubber masks are first sculpted in clay, then molded in a rigid material such as plaster, and then the rubber can be poured into the mold cavity and cured.

Some companies that mass-produce masks will first cast a latex copy from the mold deemed the master copy. Because a stone mold will gradually lose detail with every pull from the mold, the master copy is kept on hand so that it can be molded again when necessary to bring the original detail back.

From the master copy, multiple duplicate molds can be made to streamline the production process, allowing multiple copies to be made at once, while minimizing loss of detail from a single mold.

Once cured, the mask can be trimmed of excess flashing and seams and then painted. Latex masks are commonly painted with a mixture of liquid latex and latex house paint, creating a flexible and durable paint mixture that bonds to the mask. Previously, a mixture of rubber cement, oil paint, and a solvent such as naphtha was used to paint masks, however this practice has been used significantly less due to the health concerns raised by the materials. Another safe alternative is the use of PAX paints, which are a mixture of acrylic paints and prosthetic makeup adhesive, such as Pros Aide, making a highly flexible paint.

Silicone masks require a silicone based paint to ensure they bond to the surface, so often paints will be made by mixing clear silicone caulk thinned with naphtha as a base and oil paints for pigment.

Painted masks can be finished with the application of hair, either by gluing wefts of hair or individual strands to the mask, hand punching individual hairs into the surface of the mask, or by gluing on a premade wig.

== In popular culture ==
The 1978 film Halloween depicted the killer Michael Myers wearing a white Captain Kirk mask made by Don Post Studios.

The second sequel in the series, Halloween III: Season of the Witch features three styles of Halloween masks made by the fictional Silver Shamrock company. In reality, these masks were designed and sold by Don Post Studios.

The killer Ghostface in the Scream films is depicted as wearing a vinyl Halloween mask, originally made by Fun World as part of a series entitled "Fantastic Faces", the mask itself known as "The Peanut-Eyed Ghost". The mask was originally found in a house while producer Marianne Maddalena was scouting locations, and KNB EFX was commissioned to make a mask based on this design, however once the filmmakers secured the rights to use the Fun World mask, the KNB design was shelved, showing up only in a select few scenes.

The live action Batman films starting with the 1989 film typically depict Batman's cowl as a rubber mask rather than the fabric look commonly seen in the comics and the 1966 TV series. Foam latex was used for the 1989 cowl and costume and would continue to be used until The Dark Knight when the suit and cowl were cast in urethane.

Characters in Mission: Impossible use masks as a disguise in both the show and film series as a way of impersonating others.

This concept was later tested on MythBusters with Adam and Jamie getting silicone masks designed to look like themselves made by SPFX Masks and attempting to fool volunteers and their colleagues into believing that Jamie was Adam and Adam was Jamie. The two classified the myth as plausible, depending on the circumstances under which the deception is carried out.

== Gallery ==
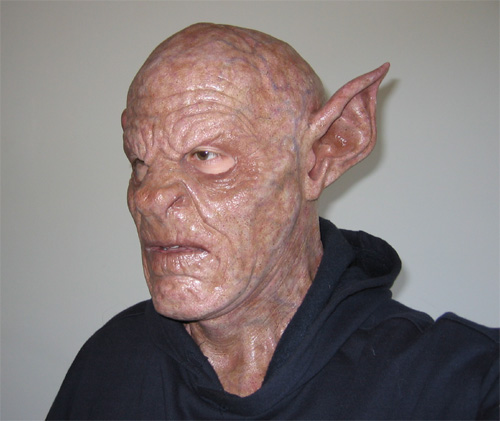
A silicone mask

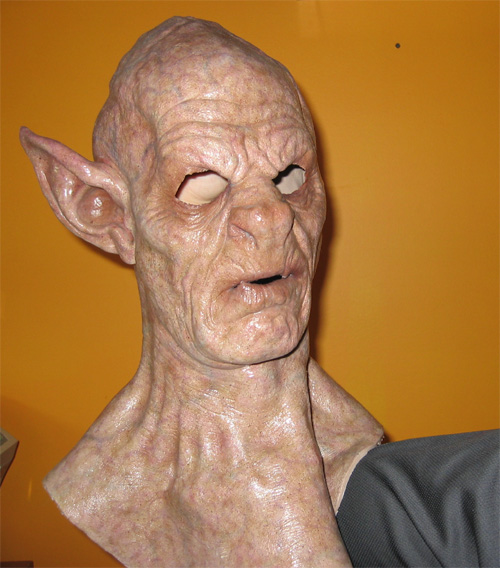
The same silicone mask, removed from the wearer

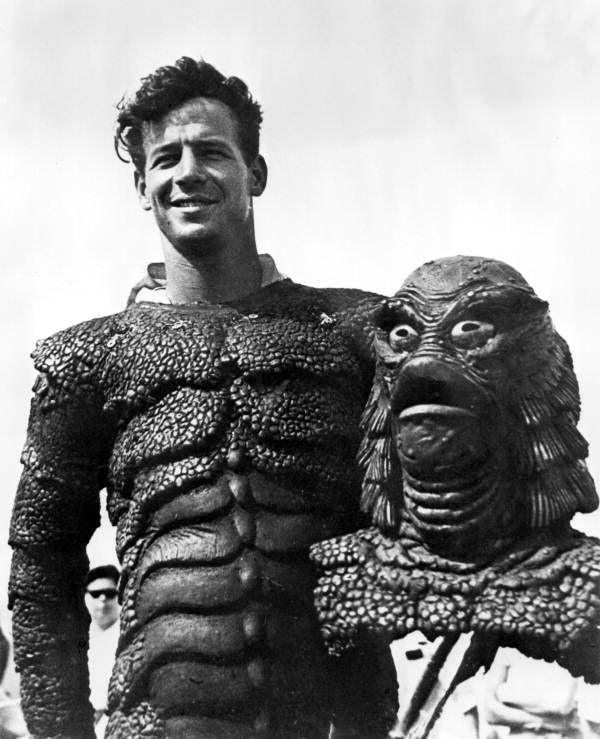
Ricou Browning behind the scenes of Creature From the Black Lagoon, holding the Gill Man mask

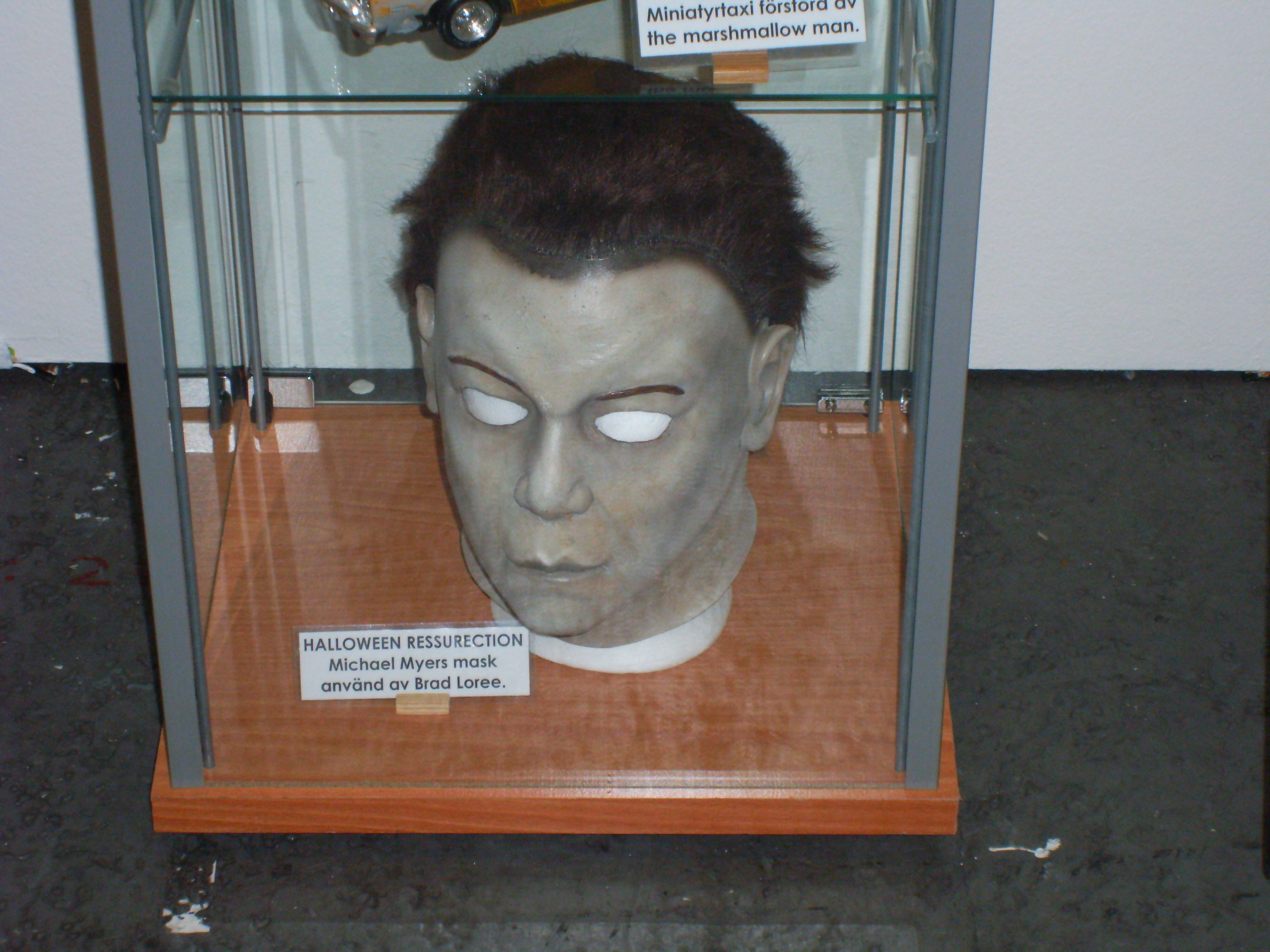
A Michael Myers mask as used in Halloween: Resurrection

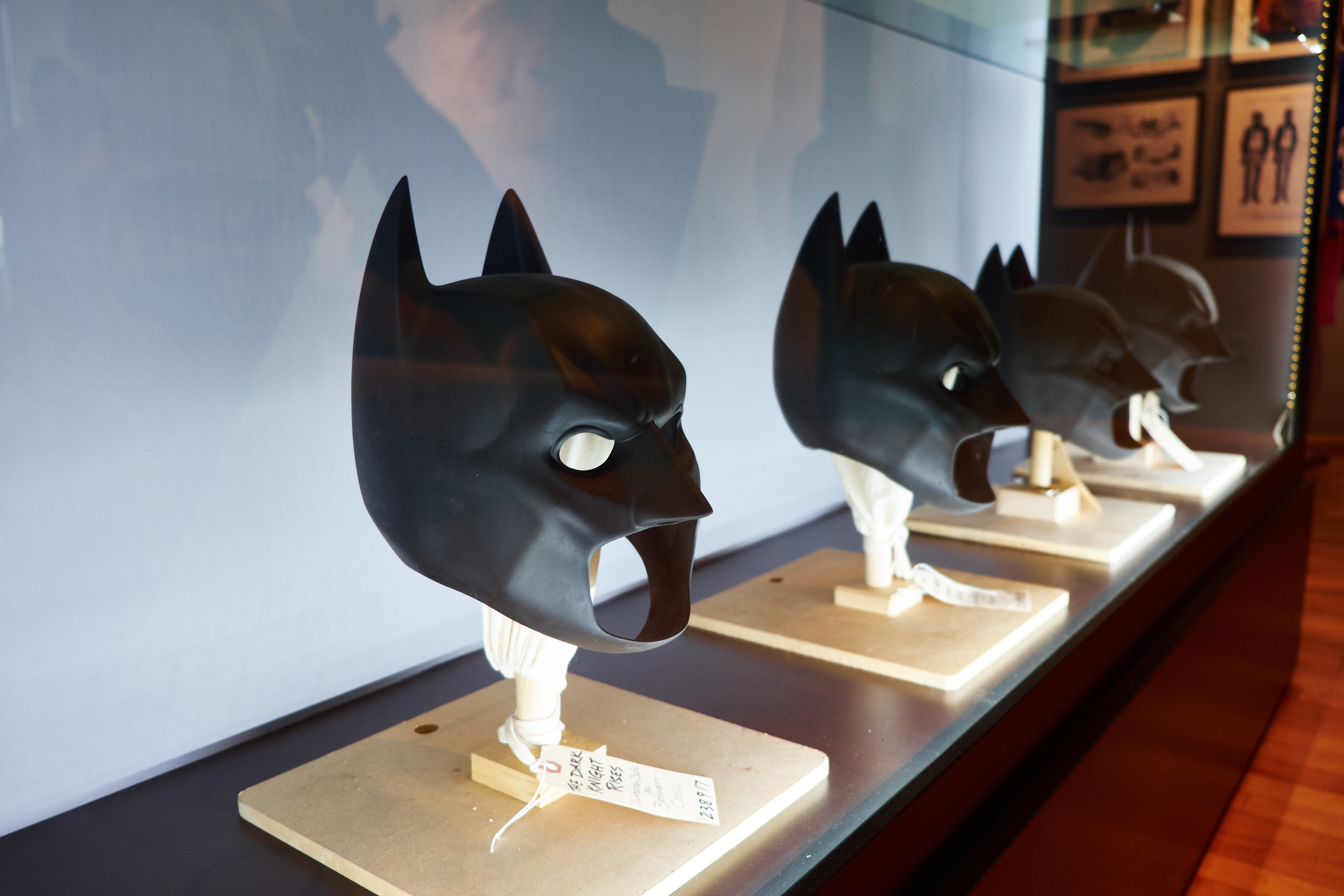
Urethane Batman cowls on the Warner Bros. Studio VIP Tour

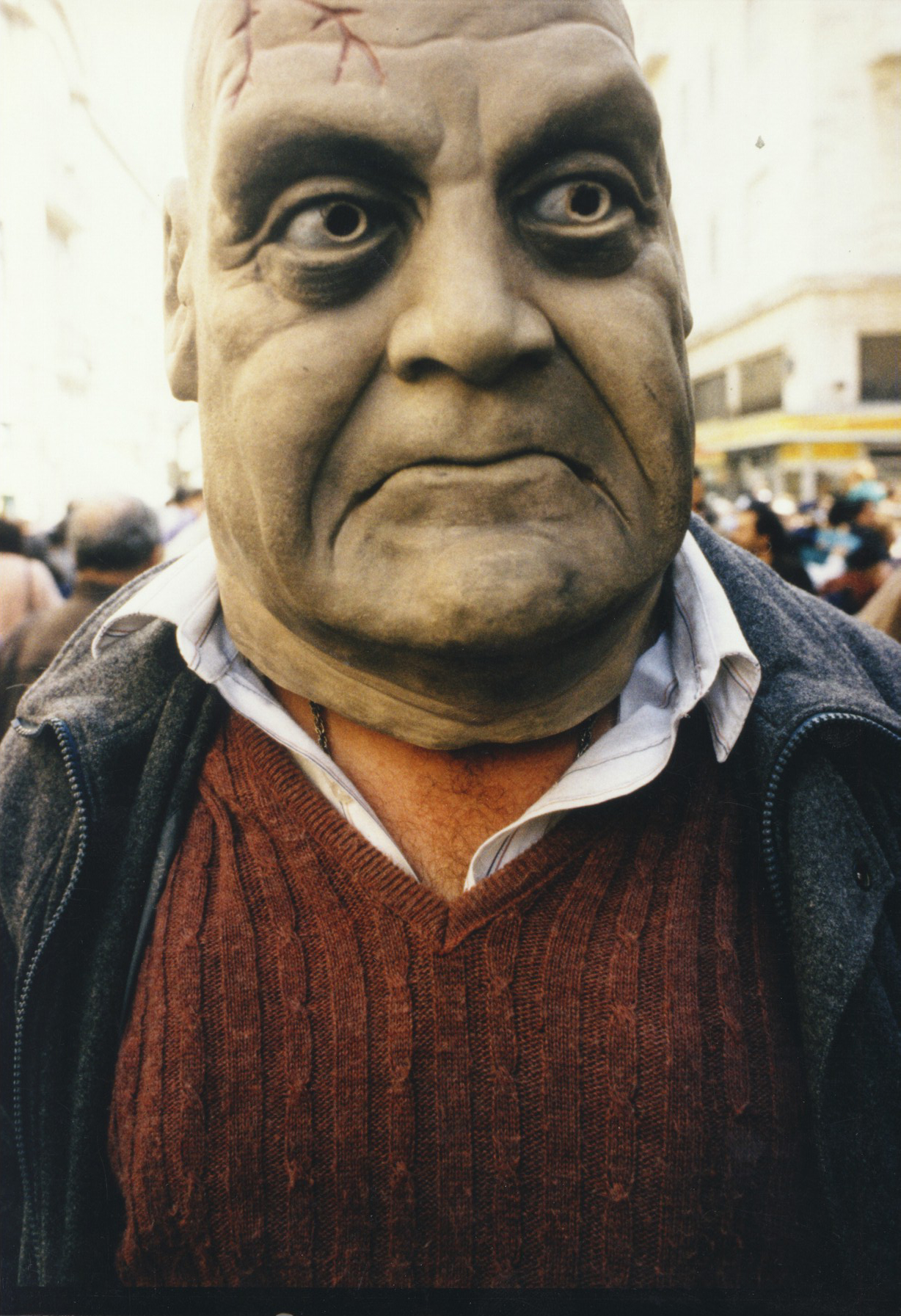
Tor Johnson mask by Don Post

== See also ==
- Guy Fawkes mask
- Halloween costume
- Horse head mask
- List of crimes involving a silicone mask
