= List of crimes involving a silicone mask =

Realistic silicone masks can be obtained cheaply and have been used in crimes throughout the world. Silicone masks have been used as a disguise to conceal identity to perpetrate crimes.

== Incidents ==
Year	Perpetrator	Crime	Reference
2010	Conrad Zdzierak	A white man used a mask he bought from SPFXmasks to appear as a black man and committed robberies in Cincinnati, Ohio, United States. A man who looked like the mask was wrongfully convicted of the crime. Only after the girlfriend of the real criminal found the mask and some ink-stained money and reported it to the police did authorities realize their mistake.	
2010	Mr. X	Air Canada masked stowaway case: a young man taking the Air Canada Flight 018 from Hong Kong to Vancouver wore a silicone mask to impersonate a white elderly man, to use someone else's identification to get into Canada.	
2011	Geezer Bandit	A Southern California, United States, bank robber known as the Geezer Bandit used a silicone mask to look like an old man.	
2014	Benoit Constant	A black man in his twenties used a mask to appear as an elderly white man to rob banks in North Carolina, United States. Identified by police based on CCTV camera images of the get away vehicle.	
2019	Gilbert Chikli and Anthony Lasarevitsch	Wore a silicone mask to impersonate French Defense Minister Jean-Yves Le Drian. In this disguise he and several others contacted politicians, business figures and large organizations across the world over Skype, claiming that France was gathering ransom money in secret to free journalists being held hostage in the Middle East by Islamist terrorists, scamming at least €55 million out of three victims before being caught.	
2019	Clauvino da Silva (Drug Lord)	He had his 19-year-old daughter visit him in prison in Brazil. In a bid to escape he wore a silicone mask to look like her, plus a wig and her clothing, and tried to sneak out, leaving her behind.	
2020	John Colletti	Wore a mask to appear to be older, and used fake driver's licenses at casino self-service kiosks to steal money from people's bank accounts.	
2025	Vance Luther Boelter	2025 shootings of Minnesota legislators: the 57-year-old man, dressed as a police officer and wearing a latex mask, shot Melissa Hortman and John Hoffman in their homes along with their spouses. While Hoffman and his wife Yvette survived, Hortman and her husband Mark did not.	

== See also ==
- Anti-mask law
- Police impersonation
- Ghostface (Scream)
- Guy Fawkes mask
