= Air Canada masked stowaway case =

Hong Kong airport security breach

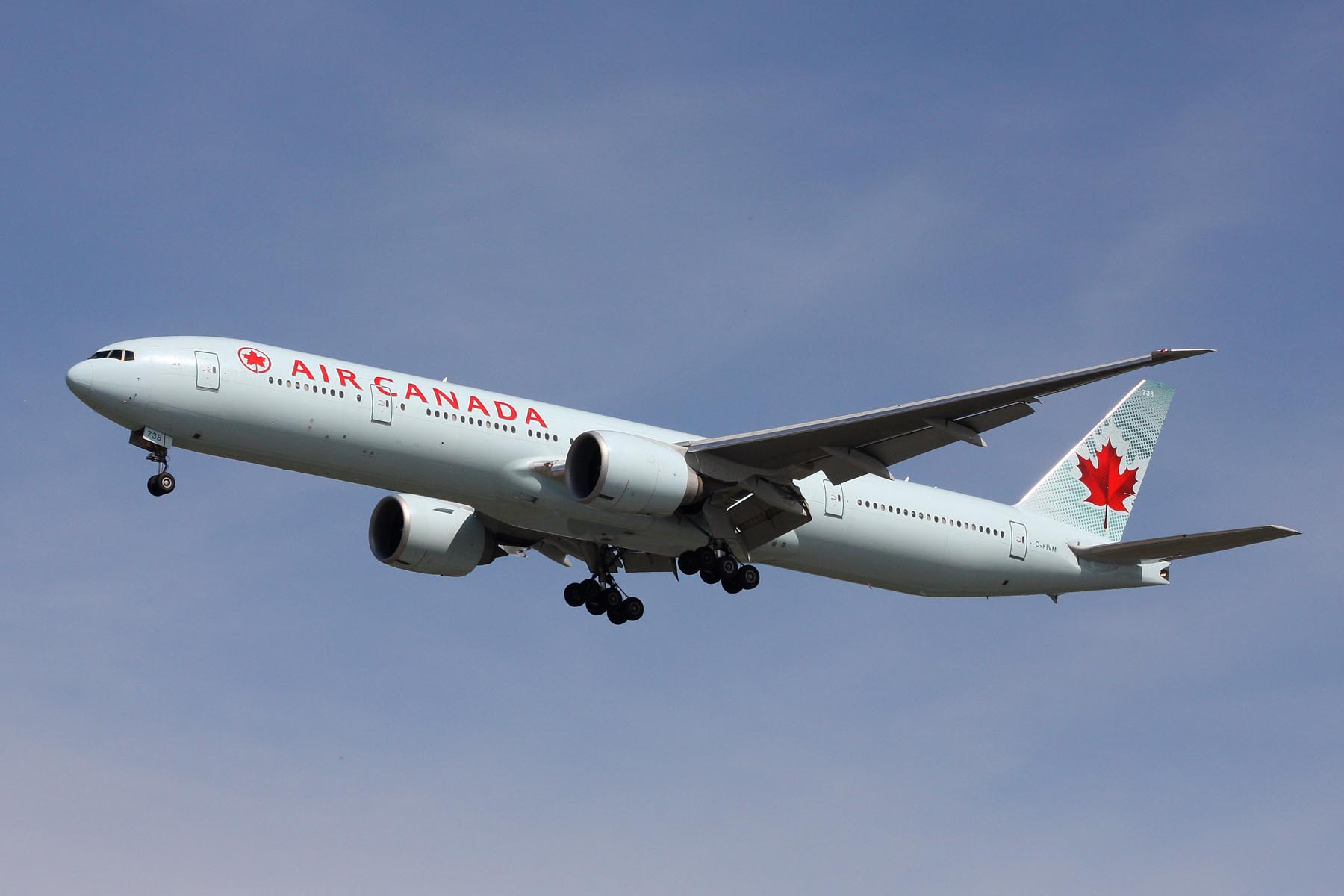
An Air Canada Boeing 777

The Air Canada masked stowaway case, also known as the Case of the "Disguised Man" (Chinese: “易容男”案件), began with a stowaway incident on October 29, 2010, when a young man of Chinese descent illegally boarded Air Canada Flight 018, flying from Hong Kong to Vancouver wearing a commercially available silicone head and neck mask to impersonate an elderly white man. He removed the mask in the aircraft lavatory later in the flight, and a passenger alerted the crew after a young Asian man tried to occupy the seat formerly occupied by what appeared to be an old white man. The crew questioned the man and then alerted authorities who took the man into custody after landing. He requested asylum in Canada, and was released on bond three months later. Because of privacy concerns the Canada Border Services Agency and the Immigration Ministry would not reveal the man's name. The incident was detailed in a confidential CBSA alert titled "Unbelievable Case Of Concealment" that was leaked to the American news network CNN who made it an international story on November 5. In Hong Kong, an organized crime probe was launched after this case embarrassed security services, and several people were arrested and convicted in conjunction with this and related cases.

== Investigations ==
This stowaway incident spawned several investigations.

After the flight arrived in Vancouver, the Canadian Border Services Agency immediately began investigating further. The man had left two carry-on bags on the aircraft, one of which contained the mask. The border agents had the man don the mask, and they took before and after photos which were later released in their intelligence alert that was leaked to CNN. They concluded that the man had made a boarding pass swap with a U.S. citizen.

Canada Border Services Agency says an investigation revealed a total of 19 CBSA employees forwarded the photo or the intelligence report to "non-authorized recipients," but they were unable to determine how CNN obtained the intelligence report. Under questioning, many employees admitted emailing the protected “intelligence alert” to friends and family because of the “amazing” and “extraordinary” nature of the case.

The incident caused the governments in Hong Kong and Canada to review security procedures. "Under the Identity Screening Regulations, airlines have the responsibility to verify the identity of all passengers who appear to be 18 years of age or older," according to a statement released immediately after the incident from the office of the Canadian Transport Minister.

After the intelligence alert was released, Air Canada confirmed that "officials from the CBSA met a passenger arriving off AC018 Hong Kong to Vancouver on October 29 and the matter is still under investigation."

Although terrorism was not alleged in this case, on November 6, 2010, at the Halifax International Security Forum, U.S. Homeland Security Secretary Janet Napolitano said this case raises concerns about a security breach that terrorists might exploit. Some discussion of this incident and use of masks for terrorist purposes was noted on a discussion board believed to be associated with terrorists.

On November 7, 2010, a spokeswoman for the Hong Kong government said that the Immigration and Security authorities were investigating. Eight people were ultimately arrested in connection with the incident, five men and three women, aged between 26 and 62 years old. All were Hong Kong citizens. The immigration department, working in concert with the Hong Kong police's organized crime unit, arrested the unidentified eight in January 2011 as a part of an operation code-named "Sandstorm".

== Hong Kong trial ==
Chau Pak-kin, 26, and Chan Wing-chung, 27 were accused of helping stowaways board flights to Canada. It was alleged that the two allowed seven passengers without the proper credentials to board flights from Hong Kong to Canada, including the masked stowaway. They were employed as ground staff of Singapore Air Terminal Services Limited, and their duties included checking documents of passengers at the boarding gates inside the departure hall of Hong Kong International Airport. They were each charged with one count of conspiracy to obtain services by deception for allowing a person with improper documentation to board an Air Canada plane, thereby defrauding Air Canada. The district court earlier ordered the two cases to be tried together in case DCCC 205 & 208 / 2011.

The 20 year old stowaway was referred to as Mr. X in the District Court. It was alleged that Mr. X used the identity of a US Citizen "Carey Henry Scott" (whose date of birth is 1955) by obtaining the boarding pass through a "boarding pass swap".

South China Morning Post Reported that Air Canada flight attendant Eddie Chau testified in the Hong Kong court that on flight AC-018 on October 29, "...he had been alerted by ground staff members and a passenger about the suspicious traveler's youthful-looking hands, so he and a colleague took a closer look at the man. 'I could see only his profile. His head was facing downward. He looked like a Caucasian but had a lot of wrinkles on his face,' Chau said. He alerted his supervisors, who in turn called in a ground staff member and informed the pilot, Chau said. The pilot nevertheless ordered the aircraft's doors to be closed for take-off. Almost four hours into the flight, Chau said, he noticed the 'old man' had disappeared from seat 43B, and that a young Chinese man was being stopped from occupying the seat by a woman sitting next to it, apparently because she thought it was reserved for the old man."

Chau Pak-kin was found guilty in the conspiracy to smuggle passengers, and was sentenced to three years in prison for his part in smuggling Mr. X. The other defendant was released due to insufficient evidence. Several others were convicted in a related case of smuggling other people from Fujian province on flights from Hong Kong to Canada.

== Asylum for stowaway ==
The stowaway's identity was not disclosed to the public, and a publication ban was put on any identifying information. After being arrested, the unidentified man claimed asylum and therefore could not be prosecuted for illegally entering Canada; nevertheless, he was detained for three months in a medium security prison.

The man's lawyer, Dan McLeod, requested a media ban on the asylum hearings to protect his client. "This is an extremely unusual case in that there has been an extremely serious and potentially dangerous leak about a refugee claimant by an unknown Canada Border Services official," McLeod told the adjudicator, referring to the CBSA intelligence alert that was leaked to the media. The lawyer also alleged that his client was being singled out, and that officials put his client in danger by leaking a photo of his client to the media with only his eyes covered, thereby "parading a prisoner who's completely at the mercy and control of the Canadian government."

At a December 8, 2010 Immigration and Refugee Board hearing in Vancouver, the man's attorney asked that he be released on bond to stay with a family friend in Ontario. The CBSA's representative said that he should be held pending further confirmation of his identity. The refugee board's adjudicator stated that the man was a flight risk, but was willing to consider releasing him in the future with a significant cash bond, and ordered the man to stay in detention until at least January 5.

At a February 3, 2011 Immigration and Refugee Board hearing, the man said that Snakeheads helped him get into Canada, and told him what to say when he arrived. It is believed the man's family paid up to $45,000 to the smugglers. At a February 11, 2011 follow-up hearing, the adjudicator stated that he was kept in detention because of concerns that a large debt would cause him not to appear, and, "though you did use a smuggling operation to get to Canada, your debt to them appears to have been paid. There is no evidence that you would continue to be vulnerable to them in this regard....I find no reason that you cannot now be influenced in a positive way specially by the person who has not only come to your aid and has a connection to your father, and he has given you his trust based upon his connection without any familial obligation to do so." The man was ordered released on $5,000 bond to a Chinese-Canadian person with ties to his family in Fujian, China, and had to report weekly to the Canada Border Services Agency in Toronto.

== Mask ==
The silicone mask used by the man was "The Elder" model from SPFX Masks of Los Angeles, California. SPFX masks intended for costume use have been used as a disguise in other illegal activities, including a series of Ohio bank robberies earlier in 2010 where a white man disguised himself as a black man.

== See also ==
- List of crimes involving a silicone mask
