= Nicolas Tenzer =

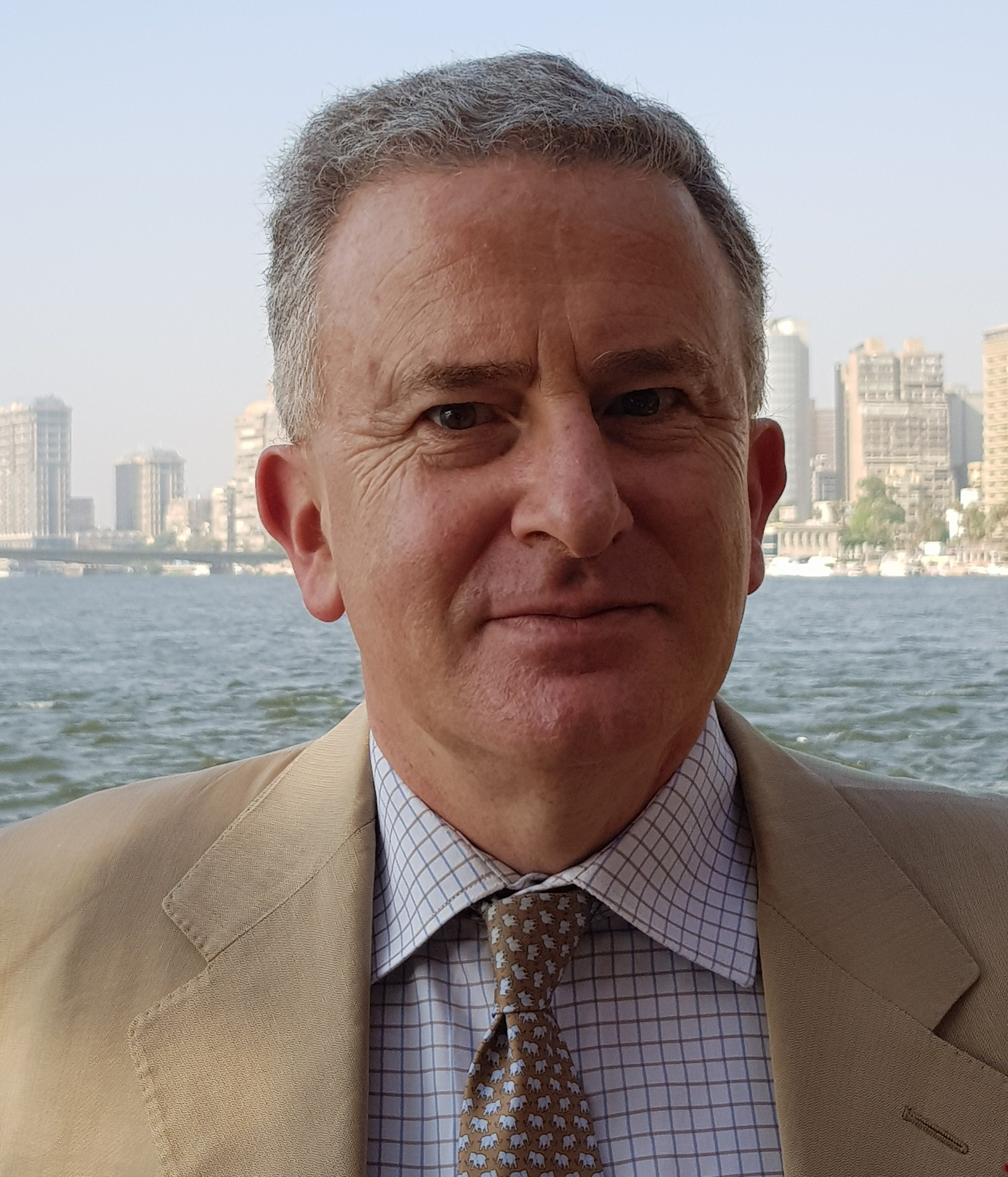
- Nicolas Tenzer
- Born: 25 February 1961 (age 64); Paris, France
- Education: Lycée Janson-de-Sailly; Lycée Louis-le-Grand
- Alma mater: École normale supérieure Sciences Po, ÉNA
- Occupations: Political scientist Writer

Nicolas Tenzer is a French civil servant, academic, writer, and editor. He was the editor of the journal Le Banquet (1992-2015) and is the founding president of the Centre d’étude et de réflexion pour l’action politique (CERAP), a position he has held since 1986. He was a director of the Aspen Institute from 2010 to 2015 and has acted as its treasurer and president. He is also a Non-resident Senior Fellow at the Center for European Policy Analysis (CEPA) in Washington, D.C.

== Biography ==
Born in 1961 to a Jewish Belgian diplomat, Martha Tenzer, he is a graduate of the École normale supérieure (1980–1982), Sciences Po (1980–1982) and the École nationale d'administration (1984–1986). He also holds a degree in history from the University of Nanterre.

He has taught political philosophy at Sciences Po (1986–2004) and since 2014 he is teaching there Science of Government (Master of International Governance and Diplomacy). As a civil servant, Tenzer is the former head of the Commissariat général du Plan (1994–2002), a former member of the staff of France's minister of Economy and Finance (1987–1988), and a former rapporteur at the Cour des comptes (1991–1993).

Nicolas Tenzer is a member of the Ordre national de la Légion d'honneur and the Ordre des Arts et des Lettres.

== Views ==
Tenzer has stated seeks a middle path between two opposing viewpoints on French power: that France's status as a power and its role in world affairs are declining, and that France's role in world affairs is increasing. In a 2016 article for online policy platform Euractiv, Tenzer stated that the EU should focus on Romania, who he claimed was the last country in Eastern Europe with a pro-European leader.

== Publications ==
- La région en quête d'avenir (La Documentation française, 1986).
- La crise africaine : quelle politique de coopération pour la France ? (with Franck Magnard, PUF, 1988)
- La société dépolitisée (PUF, 1990).
- Un projet éducatif pour la France (ed., CERAP, PUF, 1991).
- Le Spermatozoïde hors la loi : de la bioéthique à la biopolitique (with Franck Magnard, Calmann-Lévy, 1991).
- La politique (PUF, Que sais-je ?, 1991).
- Les élites et la fin de la démocratie française (with Rodolphe Delacrois, PUF, 1992).
- La République (PUF, Que sais-je ?, 1993)
- Philosophie politique (PUF, 1994, 2nd edition, 1998)
- Histoire des doctrines politiques en France (PUF, Que sais-je ?, 1996)
- Le tombeau de Machiavel: De la corruption intellectuelle de la politique (Flammarion, 1997)
- La face cachée du gaullisme: De Gaulle ou l’introuvable tradition politique (Hachette littératures, 1998)
- Les valeurs des Modernes: Réflexions sur l’écroulement politique du nouveau siècle (Flammarion, 2003)
- France : la réforme impossible ? (Flammarion, 2004).
- De l'esprit de décision. Contre l'approximation politique (with Michel de Fabiani, Gualino, 2006).
- Faut-il sauver le libéralisme ? (with Monique Canto-Sperber, Grasset, 2006).
- Pour une nouvelle philosophie politique (PUF, 2007)
- Quand la France disparaît du monde (Grasset, 2008, 3rd edition 2010)
- Le Monde à l'horizon 2030: La règle et le désordre (Perrin 2011)
- La fin du malheur français ? Pour un nouveau devoir politique (Stock 2011)
- La France a besoin des autres (Plon 2012)
- Resisting Despair in Confrontational Times (with Ramin Jahanbegloo, Har-Anand Publications, 2019)
- Notre Guerre. Le crime et l'oubli : pour une pensée stratégique (Editions de l'Observatoire, 2024)
- Fin de la politique des grandes puissances. Petits et moyens Etats à la conquête du monde (Editions de l'Observatoire, 2025)
- The Road to Chişinău: The European Political Community Report (CEPA, 2023)
- Macron Signals a Transformation in Security Policy (CEPA, 2023)
- NATO's Summit Fails Ukraine (CEPA, 2023)
- Without the United States, Europe Is Lost (CEPA, 2023)
- Security Expert urges NATO and EU action in Ukraine: a call for increased support and strategic measures (dniprotoday.com, 2023)
