= United States special envoy =

United States diplomatic position

United States special envoys or special representatives are senior officials of the U.S. Department of State representing the federal government of the United States. In contrast to U.S. ambassadors who are assigned to lead a diplomatic mission overseas and are responsible for the United States' bilateral relations with a specific country, a special envoy is assigned a specific portfolio or broader issue. These officials will typically report directly to the U.S. secretary of state and hold the rank of ambassador. On occasion, the president of the United States will appoint a special presidential envoy who would be a White House official, rather than a State Department official. Many special envoys do not require United States Senate confirmation.

Many special envoy positions and offices are created and staffed by the direction of the president and the secretary, whose political or organizational management philosophies may not be shared by their successors. As such, many of these positions may go unfilled upon assumption of office by successor presidential administrations, with their offices sometimes merged with or subsumed into other offices, or abolished altogether.

== History ==
According to the Congressional Research Service, President George Washington set the precedent for making special, temporary diplomatic appointments in 1789 when he named Gouverneur Morris as a private agent to establish normal diplomatic relations with British officials. As the United States grew as a global superpower, the number of these temporary special appointments grew, particularly in the 20th century and 21st century.

== List of current U.S. special envoys, representatives, coordinators, and advisors ==
Position	Officeholder	Appointed
U.S. Senior Advisor for Africa	Massad Boulos	April 1, 2025
United States Special Envoy for American Landowners	John Rich	July 10, 2026
U.S. Special Presential Envoy for American Tourism, Exceptionalism, and Values	Nick Adams	March 17, 2026
U.S. Senior Official for APEC	Casey Mace	August 7, 2025
U.S. Special Envoy for the Arctic	Julia Nesheiwat	2026
Senior Advisor for AUKUS	Matthew Steinhelfer	May 15, 2023
U.S. Special Envoy for Best Future Generations	Vacant since May 22, 2026	
U.S. Special Representative for the Biological Weapons Convention	Kenneth D. Ward	March 30, 2022
China Coordinator	Joshua Young	July 21, 2025
Senior Coordinator for Security Infrastructure	Erin Smart	July 8, 2024
Special Presidential Envoy for Global Partnerships	Paolo Zampolli	March 11, 2025
U.S. Special Envoy to Greenland	Jeff Landry	December 22, 2025
U.S. Special Envoy for Holocaust Issues	Ellen Germain	August 23, 2021
U.S. Special Presidential Envoy for Hostage Affairs	Vacant	
U.S. Special Envoy for Latin America	Mauricio Claver-Carone	January 20, 2025
U.S. Special Envoy to Monitor and Combat Antisemitism	Yehuda Kaploun	December 22, 2025
U.S. Special Envoy to the Middle East	Steve Witkoff	May 6, 2025
U.S. Special Envoy for the Shield of the Americas	Vacant	
U.S. Special Envoy for Ukraine	Vacant	
U.S. Special Envoy for Peace Missions	Steve Witkoff; Jared Kushner	July 3, 2025 (Witkoff); February 19, 2026 (Kushner)
U.S. Special Presidential Envoy for Special Missions	Richard Grenell	January 20, 2025
U.S. Special Envoy for Syria	Tom Barrack	May 23, 2025
Coordinator for U.S. Assistance to Europe and Eurasia	Kirsten Selinger (acting)	December 3, 2025
U.S. Special Envoy to the United Kingdom	Mark Burnett	January 20, 2025

== List of former positions ==
- United States Special Envoy for the Human Rights of LGBTI Persons
- U.S. Special Envoy for Afghan, Women, Girls, and Human Rights
- United States Special Representative for Afghanistan and Pakistan
- Senior Coordinator for Atlantic Cooperation
- U.S. Special Envoy for Biodiversity and Water Resources
- U.S. Special Representative for City and State Diplomacy
- U.S. Special Presidential Envoy for Climate
- U.S. Special Envoy to the UN Framework Convention on Climate Change
- U.S. Special Envoy for the Closure of the Guantanmo Detention Facility
- U.S. Special Envoy for the Colombian Peace Process
- U.S. Special Representative for Commercial and Business Affairs
- U.S. Special Presidential Envoy for Compact Negotiations
- U.S. Special Envoy for Critical and Emerging Technology
- U.S. Special Envoy for Digital Freedom
- U.S. Special Representative for North Korea
- Coordinator for Anti-corruption
- U.S. Special Presidential Envoy for the Global Coalition to Defeat ISIS
- Coordinator for Global Democratic Renewal
- U.S. Special Envoy and Coordinator of the Global Engagement Center
- United States Special Envoy for Eurasian Energy
- U.S. Special Envoy for Global Food Security
- U.S. Special Envoy for Global Youth Issues
- United States Special Envoy for Haiti
- Coordinator of the Health Incident Response Task Force
- U.S. Special Envoy to the Horn of Africa
- U.S. Special Envoy and Coordinator for International Energy Affairs
- U.S. Special Representative for International Labor Affairs
- U.S. Special Envoy for Iran
- U.S. Security Coordinator for Israel and the Palestinian Authority
- U.S. Special Envoy for Israeli-Palestinian Negotiations
- Senior Coordinator for Lawful Migration
- U.S. Special Envoy for Libya
- U.S. Special Envoy for Middle East Humanitarian Issues
- U.S. Special Envoy for North Korean Human Rights Issues
- United States Special Envoy for Northern Ireland
- U.S. Special Envoy for the Northern Triangle of Central America
- U.S. Special Representative for Nuclear Nonproliferation
- U.S. Special Envoy to the Organization of Islamic Cooperation
- Special Coordinator for Global Infrastructure and Investment
- U.S. Special Representative for Racial Equity and Justice
- U.S. Special Envoy for the Sahel Region of Africa
- U.S. Special Envoy for Six-Party Talks
- U.S. Special Envoy to Sudan and South Sudan
- Special Coordinator for Tibetan Issues
- U.S. Special Representative for Ukraine's Economic Recovery
- U.S. Special Representative for Venezuela
- U.S. Special Representative for the Western Balkans
- U.S. Special Envoy for Yemen

== See also ==
- Ambassadors of the United States
- Ambassador-at-large
- United States Assistant Secretary of State
- List of positions filled by presidential appointment with Senate confirmation
