= Kevin Kattke =

American political operative

- Born: February 18, 1949 (age 77); Rockaway, Queens
- Occupations: engineer, anti-communist, civil servant

Kevin Kattke (b. February 18, 1949) was a maintenance engineer at Macy's. He was known for his anti-communist intelligence-gathering and relationship with Oliver North, who involved Kattke in covert operations. Kattke's off-the-books work for the US Government highlighted the increased privatization of government activities during the Reagan years, bypassing normal channels and accountability. Oliver North referred to Kattke as a "right-wing ideologue," operating "like a rogue CIA agent."

== Early life and education ==
Kattke was born in Rockaway, Queens to Bill and Elsie Kattke. His father was a German-American engineer and his mother was an Irish-American homemaker. They both worked for the Republican party and Kattke grew up with an interest in politics. He was briefly in the Army in 1968 after which he got married and moved to Freeport, New York. He got a degree in air conditioning and heating ducts from a technical school. He took a job as a maintenance engineer at Macy's and pursued a hobby interest in collecting rifles. He and his wife separated in 1973 and she told the police about his collection of weapons.

== Early political work ==
Kattke was anti-Communist and a "hobbyist in foreign policy" with no official training or credentials. He felt that the Vietnam War had been embarrassing to America. When his neighbor, stockbroker George Hebert, after seeing his interactions with the police, asked Kattke if he could obtain weapons-grade uranium for a plot to overthrow Michael Manley, the two started talking. Kattke was concerned that Jamaica could become Communist and started taking time off from Macy's to work on supporting the right-wing Jamaican labor party. They began working with another Freeport neighbor, Roy Harris in 1974, and began sharing their intelligence about Jamaica with CIA agents who "To their amazement... listened."

The three men continued their intelligence-gathering in the Caribbean, cultivating a large number of contacts there and elsewhere, and became interested in the political situation in Iran. Hebert occasionally would call the FBI to report on the activities of Kattke and Harris, and told people he worked for the CIA. In 1981 the three men met Michael Sylvester, the former assistant attorney general for Grenada, who was working with other exiled Grenadians to try to overthrow Maurice Bishop. Kattke let Sylvester live on the boat he had stored in his yard. A building inspector, Sal Imburgio, sent to check out neighbor complaints of a man living on the boat, became interested in the cause and joined the three men. The four men and Sylvester created the Grenadian Movement for Freedom and Democracy. They wrote position papers and lobbied elected Republicans in Washington, D.C. to overthrow Bishop and his government. The group began getting information sent to them from a Grenadian police commissioner who had been stripped of his authority by the Bishop regime. Kattke tried to share this information with his contacts at the Pentagon but claimed he did not get much interest. They had meetings with US Special Forces representatives at Fort Bragg in the weeks before the Grenadian invasion.

== Work with US government ==
Constantine Menges worked for the US as a national intelligence officer for the Latin American region and later for the National Security Council, serving as special assistant to President Ronald Reagan. He got in touch with Kattke and put him in direct contact with Oliver North. North and Kattke spoke regularly in mid-October 1983 and North asked Kattke if he could "form a government-in-exile" for Grenada. Kattke tried but failed, but continued to communicate with North about other actions in support of regime change in Grenada. After the US invasion of Grenada, Kattke and his friends were seen as a reputable source for intelligence. Kattke claimed that North sent him to Grenada as North's personal emissary. The group met Oliver North in person in Washington, D.C. in November 1983. They also became close with Raymond Burghardt who succeeded Menges.

Kattke and his friends, on the advice of North, created an organization called the National Freedom Institute. They advised North and the government about foreign policy in places such as Guyana, Haiti, Iran, and the Sudan. The group took the place of the official American delegation at the inauguration of the Dominican Republic's president Joaquín Balaguer in 1986 and held meetings with leaders of Caribbean and Latin American countries.

Kattke was now moonlighting as a stockbroker to support his activities. He introduced North to Mousalreza Ebrahim who, under the guise of helping raise money to support the Contras via the National Endowment for the Preservation of Liberty, ultimately was revealed to be a con man. Kattke met with Laurence Pope and discussed his connections to a group of people who wanted to overthrow the Ayatollah Khomeni in 1987. Pope said he could not continue conversations with Kattke if Kattke were trying to violate the Neutrality Act because "as much as we dislike the Khomeini regime we are not in the business of trying to overthrow it."

== Veracity of claims ==
It's not known which of Kattke's activities resulted in concrete actions and which were exaggerated. He would claim, for example, that he was testifying before a prestigious Senate committee when he had only spoken to a single member. Reactions to the group's lobbying were mixed with some Senate aides calling them "nut cases", while others called Kattke "a sincere and down-to-earth person lobbying for ideals." Testimony from Congressional committees investigating the Iran–Contra affair stated that Kattke's group was involved in "helping make arrangements" to sell missiles as part of the Iran-Contra arms-for-hostages deal. Most of the group's active work was about making introductions to the right people; Kattke would often meet refugees living in exile in New York, or they would seek him out. He would gather information from them that he would share with the US government. A staff member of an unnamed American intelligence agency called Kattke "an idiot savant on foreign affairs."

== Later years and legacy ==
Kattke's last public lobbying efforts were to support and promote electronic voting machines in 1989. He dropped out of public view after 1989 with the exception of his Congressional testimony and a news article about Macy's. He moved out of Long Island and ran unsuccessfully for some small local political offices. The National Freedom Institute was officially dissolved in 2010.

Kattke was featured in a podcast about the Iran-Contra scandal by Leon Neyfakh in 2020. The first episode of the eight episode series was titled "Get Me Kevin Kattke." Neyfahk had read about Kattke in a lengthy New York magazine profile in 1987 titled "Ollie's Army: How a Macy's Engineer and His Pals Became Rogue American Agents." Neyfahk became interested in Kattke the "schlubby semi-spy" and the idea that "the government, at the end of the day, is really just a bunch of people. The fact that they've been temporarily put in charge of institutions that are much bigger than them doesn't change that."
