= Water safety =

Human safety in the vicinity of bodies of water

Water safety refers to the procedures, precautions and policies associated with safety in, on, and around bodies of water, where there is a risk of injury or drowning. It has applications in several occupations, sports and recreational activities.

== Associated industries ==
Manufacture of marine and aquatic safety equipment.

== Associated occupations ==
=== Lifeguard ===
A lifeguard is a rescuer who supervises the safety and rescue of swimmers, surfers, and other water sports participants such as in a swimming pool, water park, beach, spa, river and lake. Lifeguards are trained in swimming and CPR/AED first aid, certified in water rescue using a variety of aids and equipment depending on requirements of their particular venue. In some areas, lifeguards are part of the emergency services system to incidents and in some communities, lifeguards may function as the primary EMS provider.

=== Air-sea rescue ===
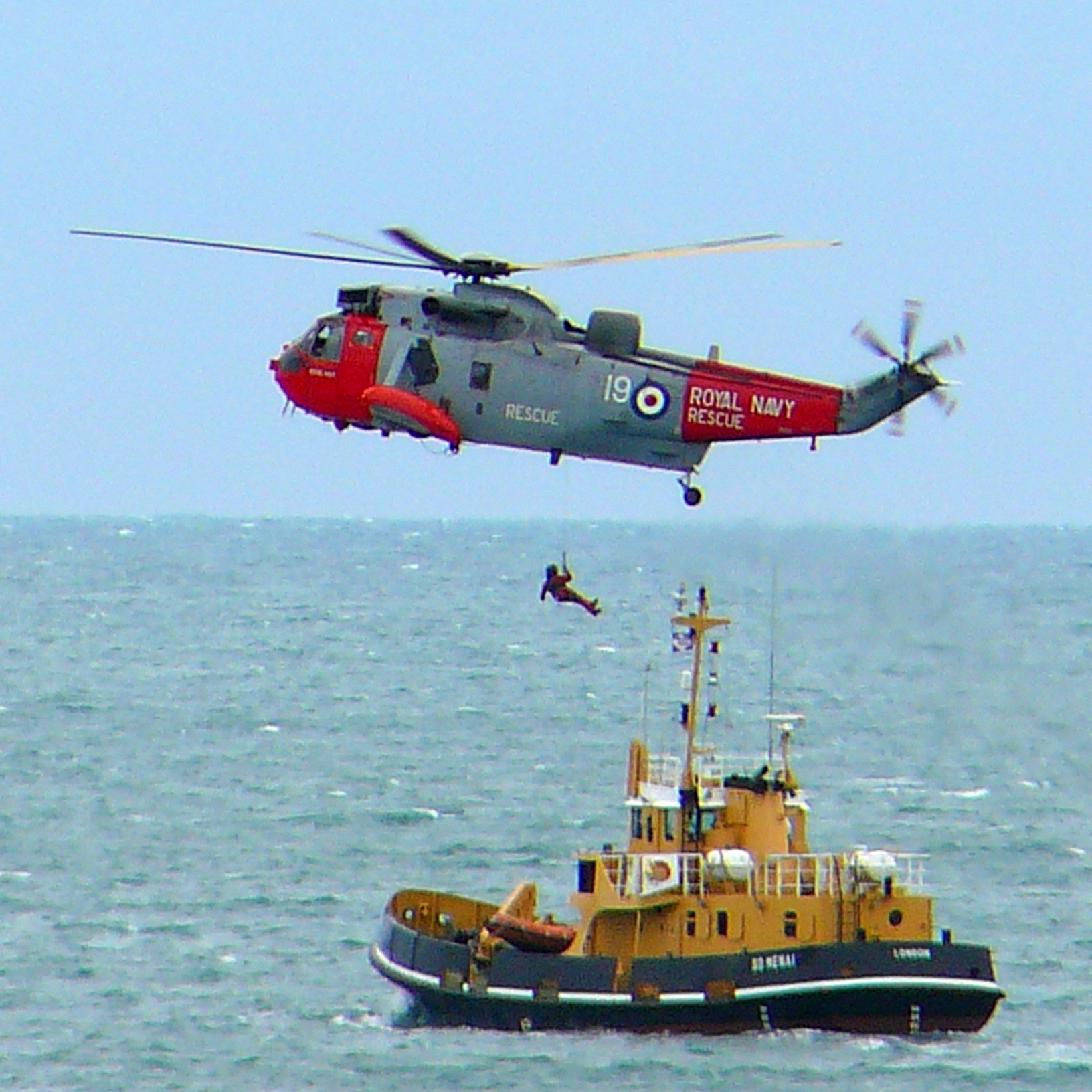
A Royal Navy rescue helicopter in action above a boat

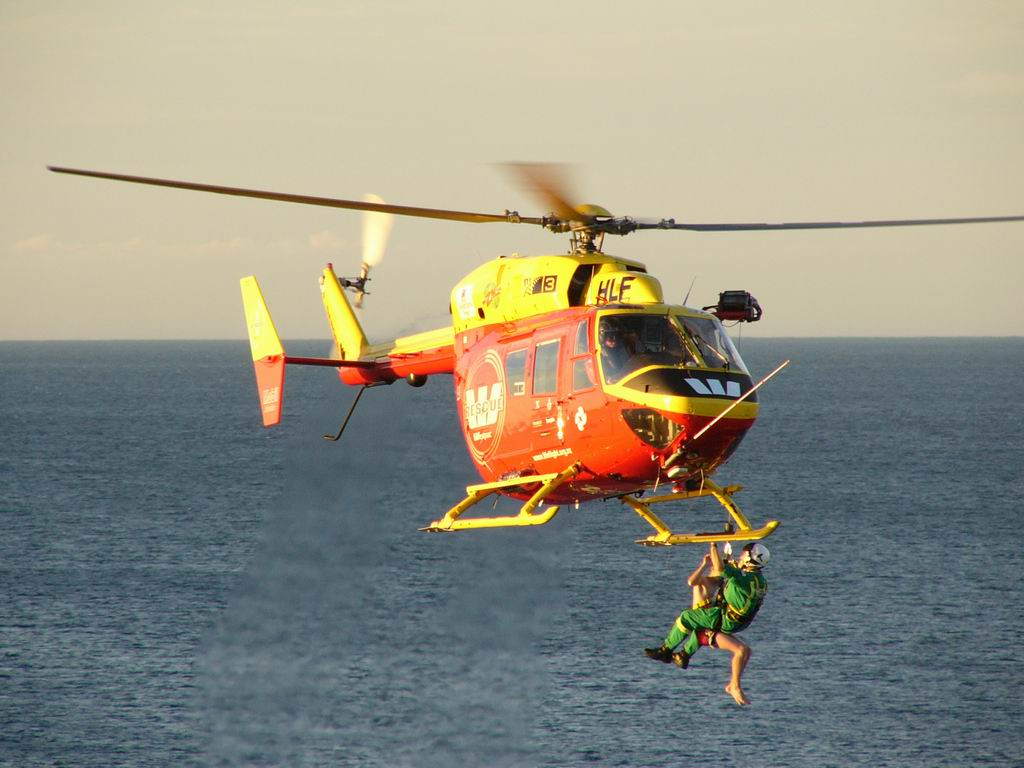
An Auckland Rescue Helicopter in action

Air-sea rescue (ASR or A/SR, also known as sea-air rescue) is the coordinated search and rescue (SAR) of the survivors of emergency water landings and people who have survived the loss of their seagoing vessel or are otherwise in peril at sea. ASR can involve a wide variety of resources including seaplanes, helicopters, submarines, rescue boats and ships. Specialized equipment and techniques have been developed. Military and civilian units can perform air-sea rescue.

Air-sea rescue operations carried out during war have saved valuable trained and experienced airmen. Moreover, the knowledge that such operations are being carried out greatly enhanced the morale of the combat aircrew faced not only with the expected hostile reaction of the enemy but with the possible danger of aircraft malfunction during long overwater flights.

=== Coastguard ===
A coastguard is a maritime security organization of a country. The term covers wide range of responsibilities in different countries, from being a heavily armed military force with customs and security duties to a volunteer organization tasked with search and rescue without law enforcement authority. In most countries, a typical coast guard's functions are distinct from those of the navy (a military service) and the transit police (a law enforcement agency), while in some countries it has similarities to both.

=== Lifeboat service ===
A rescue lifeboat is a rescue craft which is used to attend a vessel in distress, or its survivors, to rescue crew and passengers. It can be hand pulled, sail powered or powered by an engine. Lifeboats may be rigid, inflatable or rigid-inflatable combination hulled vessels.

There are generally three types of boat, inland (used on lakes and rivers), inshore (used in coastal waters) and offshore (into deeper waters and further out to sea). A rescue lifeboat is a boat designed with specialised features for searching for and rescuing people in peril at sea or in estuaries. Where practicable, lifeboats will usually perform minor salvage and towing operations to assist mariners in distress and prevent navigational hazards.

== Education and training ==
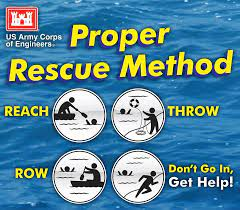
Advice given to would-be rescuers of a drowning victim

The World Health Organization has reported that drowning is the third leading cause of unintentional injury death worldwide, accounting for 7% of all injury-related deaths. Education and training in water safety is intended to help prevent and raise awareness of accidental drownings and other water related deaths and may include but is not limited to pool, boating, and flood safety. Organizations that offer education and training include the American Red Cross, World Health Organization, and Royal Life Saving Society UK, but can also include for-profit businesses.

Educational tools used can include books, songs, and awareness campaigns that are targeted towards high-risk communities. Material can be tailored to the types of most common water related injuries and death that a community will experience, as well as information as to which portion of is at the highest risk. Advice given in educational materials can include content such as safe pool practices, how to avoid boating hazards, and what to do during a flood or flood warning. Examples of campaigns include Weather.gov's "Turn around and don't Drown" campaign, which educates people on the danger of driving into flood waters.

== Water safety organisations ==
There are many government and non-government bodies in the field of water safety, including maritime search and rescue organisations, lifeguard associations, and other safety organisations for which water safety is just part of their scope.

== See also ==
- Pool safety camera – Video monitoring or camera systems
- SwimSafe
- Maritime safety – Safety around maritime activities
