= Daniel Kritenbrink =

American diplomat

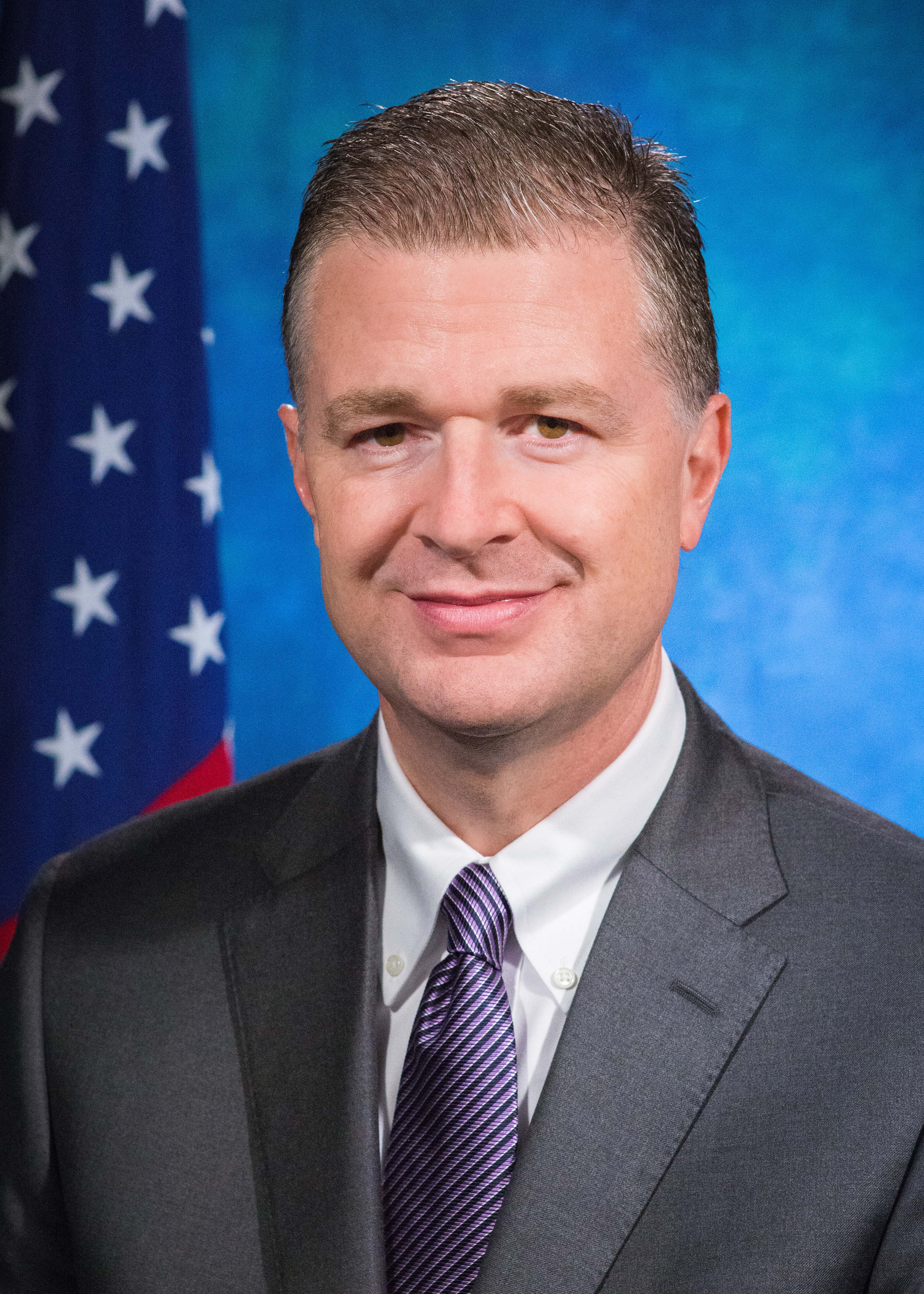
- Kritenbrink in 2017

27th Assistant Secretary of State for East Asian and Pacific Affairs
- In office September 24, 2021 – January 20, 2025
- President: Joe Biden
- Preceded by: David R. Stilwell
- Succeeded by: Michael G. DeSombre

United States Ambassador to Vietnam
- In office November 6, 2017 – April 15, 2021
- President: Donald Trump; Joe Biden
- Preceded by: Ted Osius
- Succeeded by: Marc Knapper

Personal details
- Education: University of Nebraska, Kearney (BA); University of Virginia (MA)

Daniel Joseph Kritenbrink is an American diplomat. He served as assistant secretary of state for East Asian and Pacific affairs from September 2021 to January 2025. He was the United States ambassador to Vietnam from 2017 to 2021.

== Education ==
Kritenbrink attended Ashland-Greenwood High School, Nebraska, before he earned a bachelor of arts degree in political science from the University of Nebraska at Kearney and a master of arts from the University of Virginia. While a student in Nebraska, he participated in a short study tour to the Soviet Union, and he spent a full academic year at Kansai Gaidai University in Japan.

== Career ==
Kritenbrink has been a member of the United States Foreign Service since 1994 and has held senior leadership positions at the Department of State and United States National Security Council.

He completed multiple overseas tours in Beijing, Tokyo, Sapporo, and Kuwait City. His Washington assignments have included staff assistant to the assistant secretary of state for Near Eastern affairs and director of the Office of Chinese and Mongolian Affairs at the Department of State. He then served as deputy chief of mission at the U.S. Embassy in Beijing from 2013 to 2015, and senior director for Asian affairs at the National Security Council from 2015 to 2017.

=== United States ambassador to Vietnam ===
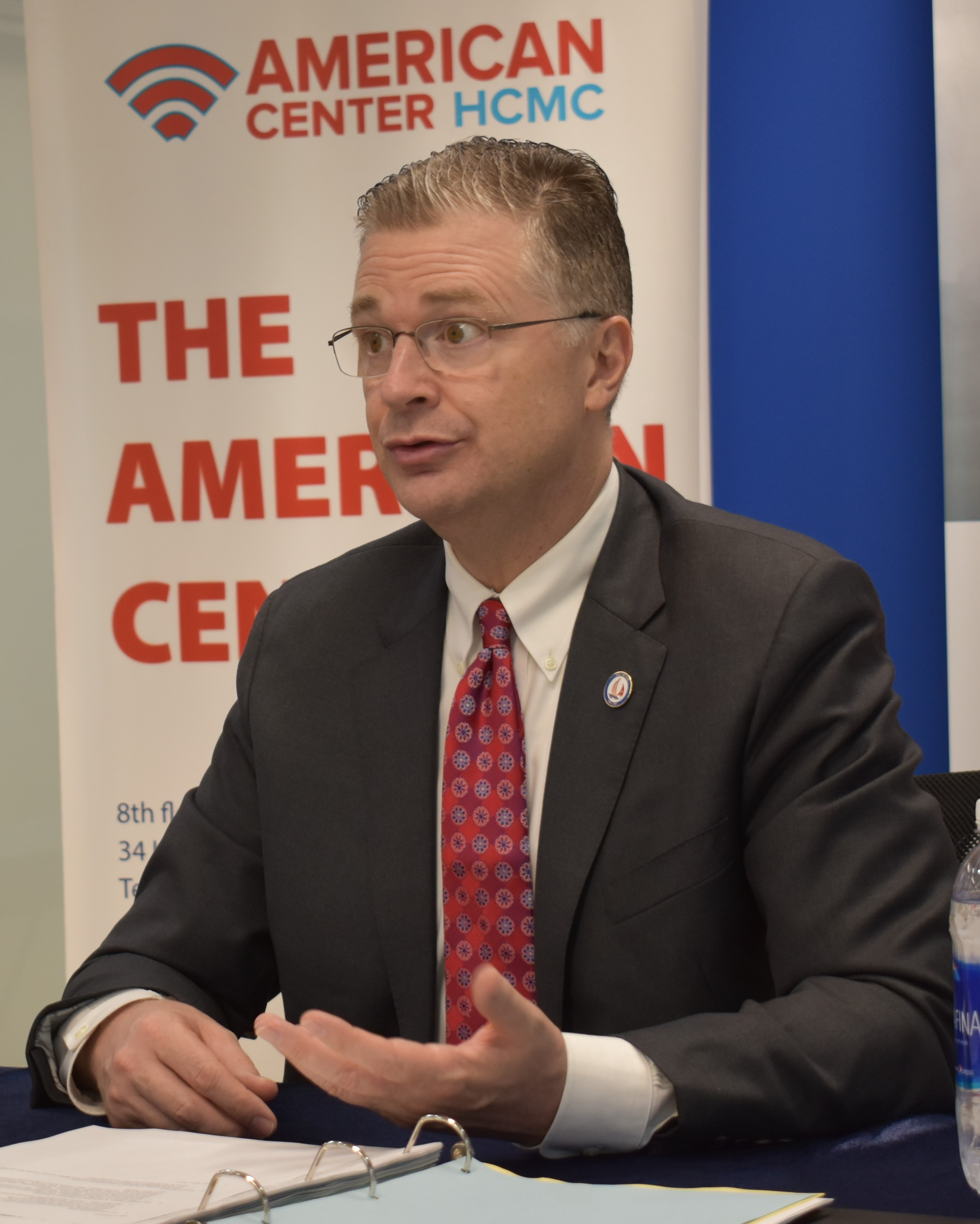
Daniel Kritenbrink speaks to journalists at the American Center in Ho Chi Minh City, Vietnam on 22 June 2020.

A career member of the Senior Foreign Service, Kritenbrink was nominated by President Donald Trump to become the U.S. ambassador to Vietnam on July 27, 2017. Prior to his nomination, he served as senior advisor for North Korea policy at the United States Department of State. He was confirmed by the U.S. Senate on October 26, 2017, and presented his credentials to Vietnamese President Trần Đại Quang on November 6, 2017.

Kritenbrink told Vietnamese media shortly after taking office that representing the U.S. in an "important country" like Vietnam was "a dream come true". His ambassadorship is marked by warming relations between the United States and Vietnam, with him being regarded by Vietnamese state media as "the ambassador of the firsts" for his work to advance reconciliation between the former foes.

During his tenure, two U.S. aircraft carriers visited Vietnam. The USS Carl Vinson made a port call off Đà Nẵng on 5 March 2018, becoming the first U.S. aircraft carrier to dock in the country since the Vietnam War ended in 1975. Two years later, the USS Theodore Roosevelt and its escorts completed a five-day visit to Đà Nẵng on 9 March 2020.

On 27 August 2019, Kritenbrink became the first U.S. ambassador to visit a cemetery of North Vietnamese soldiers killed in the war when he visited the Trường Sơn Cemetery in Đông Hà, Quảng Trị where more than 10,000 fallen PAVN soldiers are laid to rest.

On June 22, 2020, on the campus of Fulbright University Vietnam, Kritenbrink presented a two year $5 million USAID grant to support them with their international accreditation within the following five years.

In February 2021, Kritenbrink made global headlines for an original rap and music video he recorded ahead of Tết celebrations in Vietnam.

=== Assistant Secretary of State for East Asian and Pacific Affairs ===
On March 26, 2021, President Joe Biden nominated Kritenbrink to be assistant secretary of state for East Asian and Pacific affairs. The Senate's Senate Foreign Relations Committee held hearings on his nomination on June 15, 2021. The committee reported his nomination favorably to the Senate floor on June 24, 2021. Kritenbrink was confirmed by the Senate on September 23, 2021, by a vote of 72–14.

In a June 23, 2023 speech outlining the U.S. policy in the South China Sea, Kritenbrink said the United States had a strategic interest in upholding the rights of all countries to exercise freedom of navigation and overflight. He labeled China's maritime claims in the waters as unlawful. He said that the United States took no position on the competing territorial claims in the waters but insisted that all claims must align with the 1982 Law of the Sea Convention. Key U.S. efforts to advance its interest in the South China Sea included, according to Kritenbrink, diplomacy to promote international law, maritime capacity-building programs for regional partners, and U.S. military operations to demonstrate freedom of navigation. He said the United States also supported ASEAN's code of conduct negotiations and provides significant military and law enforcement assistance to Southeast Asian partners.

Kritenbrink has described China as the "biggest geopolitical test" for the U.S., advocating for competition from a position of strength by working with allies, protecting what he said were sensitive technologies, and countering what he characterized as unfair Chinese trade practices while maintaining open communication to avoid conflict. He has emphasized competing with China from a position of strength, including aligning closely with allies, promoting an open and rules-based international order, and countering China's coercive practices in regions like the Global South and Indo-Pacific. Kritenbrink has highlighted concerns over what he has characterized as China's coercive behavior toward Taiwan and its broader attempts to reshape the international order, while reaffirming the U.S.'s commitment to its one China policy. At the same time, Kritenbrink has stated that the United States supports collaboration with China where mutual interests align, such as addressing climate change, combating fentanyl trafficking, and ensuring nuclear safety. He has said that a strong U.S.-China relationship can promote regional stability and security, and he has stressed the importance of maintaining open communication channels to reduce risks of conflict and manage tensions effectively. This includes what he called "intense diplomacy" to ensure stability while pursuing competitive objectives.

In 2022 Kritenbrink characterized the U.S. alliance with Japan as "stronger than it's ever been," arguing that the alliance was playing a larger role in regional stability and global issues. He has highlighted the transformative potential of improving relations between Japan and South Korea, calling it a "stunning" development that aligns with collective interests in maintaining peace and stability in the Indo-Pacific In late 2024, the official U.S. readout of a meeting he chaired stressed the importance of trilateral cooperation between the U.S., Japan, and South Korea to address regional challenges, including the deepening military cooperation between North Korea and Russia and developments in North Korea's nuclear and ballistic missile programs, which the U.S. stated was "deeply destabilizing and pose a grave threat to regional and global security."

Kritenbrink has emphasized the importance of U.S.-ASEAN relations as a cornerstone of regional stability and prosperity. He has described ASEAN as a "critical partner" for the U.S., highlighting shared principles reflected in the U.S. Indo-Pacific Strategy and ASEAN Outlook on the Indo-Pacific. He has underscored U.S. efforts to elevate the partnership through enhanced cooperation in areas such as maritime security, trade, energy, and climate action.

Kritenbrink stepped down from his position as Assistant Secretary of State for East Asia and the Pacific Affairs at the end of the Biden Administration and retired from the Foreign Service on January 31, 2025.

== Post-diplomatic career ==
Kritenbrink joined the consultancy The Asia Group as a partner in February, 2025. In that capacity, he has commented regularly on U.S. relations with countries in the Asia-Pacific. He urged China to treat the deal by Hong Kong-based CK Hutchison to sell its Panama Canal ports to an American firm as a “private transaction.” Otherwise China risks "further complicating" its relations with the United States, he told a Hong Kong news outlet. On a separate occasion, Kritenbrink said that Vietnam, in response to the second Trump Administration's tariff policies, has focused on high-level diplomacy and made significant efforts to reduce its trade surplus with the United States through agreements on energy, aviation, and other areas. Vietnam had also endeavored to improve market access and reduce legal barriers for American businesses, he added.

== Personal life ==
Kritenbrink speaks Chinese and Japanese. He and his wife Nami are the parents of two children.

Diplomatic posts
Preceded by Ted Osius	United States Ambassador to Vietnam; 2017–2021	Succeeded by Marc Knapper
Preceded by Kin W. Moy; Acting	Assistant Secretary of State for East Asian and Pacific Affairs; 2021–2025	Succeeded by Michael G. DeSombre
