= College of Engineering, Physics, and Computing =

School in Washington D.C., US

Coordinates: 38.9369°N 77.0004°W

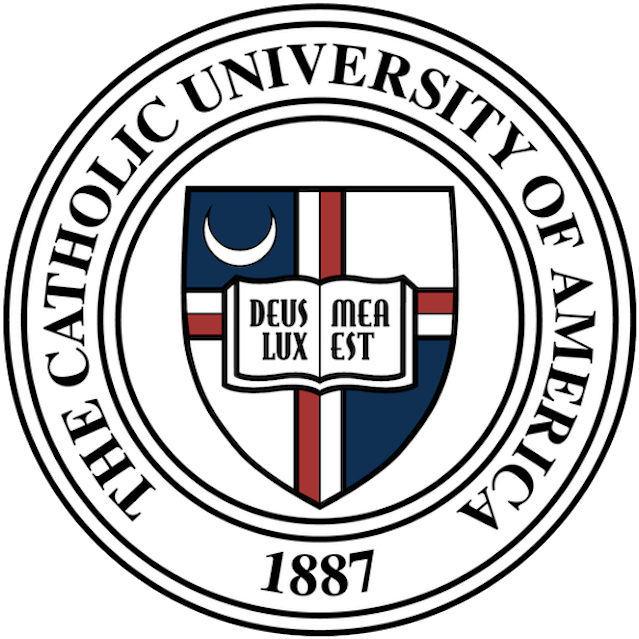
- Parent institution: The Catholic University of America
- Affiliations: Catholic
- Dean: J. Steven Brown
- Location: Washington D.C., United States
- Website: engineering.cua.edu

The College of Engineering, Physics, and Computing is one of the twelve schools at The Catholic University of America, located in Washington, D.C. (USA), and one of 41 higher education catholic institutions that offer Engineering Programs in the United States. It was reported to be the biggest Catholic graduate school of engineering in the nation.

In 2020, it was ranked number 22 in the nation among colleges that offer a bachelor's degree in civil engineering based on median salary one year after graduating.

== History ==
The School of Engineering at Catholic University was formally established in 1930, but the first engineering program at the university was started back in 1896.

The school was soon renamed as the School of Engineering and Architecture, but retook the original name in 1992 when a new School of Architecture and Planning separated from the school. The school was renamed again in 2025 to College of Engineering, Physics, and Computing.

== Departments ==
- Department of Biomedical Engineering
- Department of Civil and Environmental Engineering
- Department of Computer Science
- Department of Electrical and Computer Engineering
- Department of Mechanical Engineering
- Department of Physics

== Undergraduate programs ==
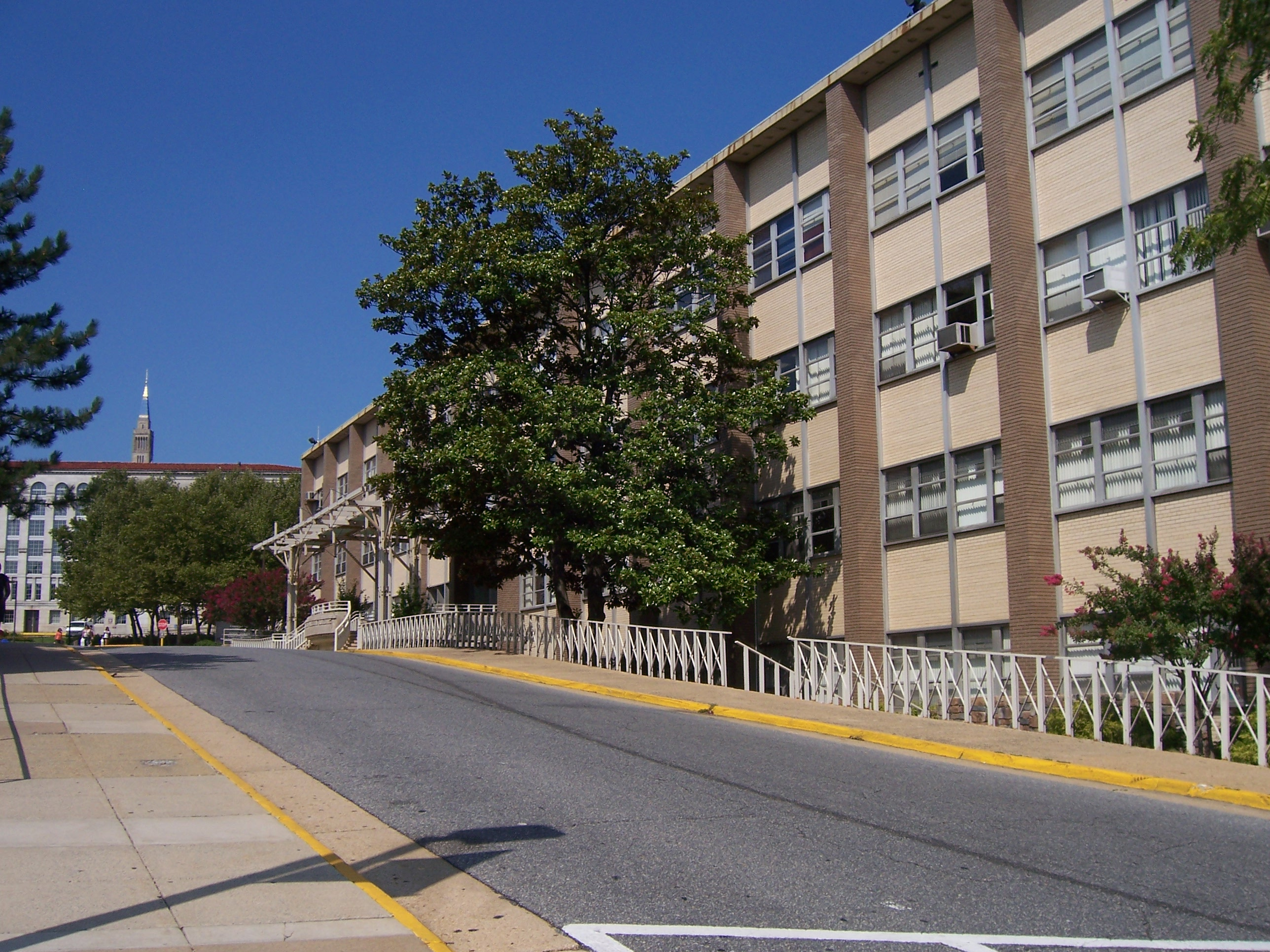
Pangborn Hall

The school offers Bachelor's degrees in biomedical engineering, civil engineering, electrical engineering, mechanical engineering (all of them accredited by the Engineering Accreditation Commission -EAC- of the Accreditation Board for Engineering and Technology) and computer science.

== Graduate programs ==
Master of Science (M.S.) degrees are offered in biomedical engineering, civil and environmental engineering, engineering management, electrical engineering and computer science, materials science and engineering, and mechanical engineering, while Doctor of Philosophy (Ph.D.) degrees can be obtained in biomedical engineering, civil and environmental engineering, electrical engineering and computer science and mechanical engineering.

== Foreign partnerships ==
The school runs a dual-degree program with Marche Polytechnic University (Italy) that allows students in biomedical or environmental engineering to obtain two master's degrees.

== Alumni ==
=== Engineering Distinguished Alumni Award ===
- Melvin G. Williams, Jr., M.S.E. 1984. Former associate deputy secretary of energy.
- Get Moy, B.C.E. 1974. Director of installations requirements and management for the U.S. Department of Defense.
- Letitia A. Long, M.S.E. 1988. Former director of the National Geospatial-Intelligence Agency.

=== Alumni Wall of Fame ===
The Catholic University School of Engineering honors alumni of the school at the Alumni Wall of Fame since 2008. Nominees are presented by the School of Engineering Executive Committee to the dean.

- Michael D. Griffin, M.S.E.'74. Administrator of NASA from 2005 to 2009.
- Paul G. Gaffney II, M.S.E.'70. President of Monmouth University and former president of the National Defense University.
- Michael W. Michalak, M.S.E.'73. United States Ambassador to Vietnam.
- James A. Wilding, B.C.E.'59. Former President/CEO of the Metropolitan Washington Airports Authority.
- Charles H. Kaman, '40. Founder of Kaman Aircraft Company.
- Donald A. Lamontagne, B.S.E. 1969. Former commander of Air University.
