= L. Desaix Anderson =

American diplomat (1936–2021)

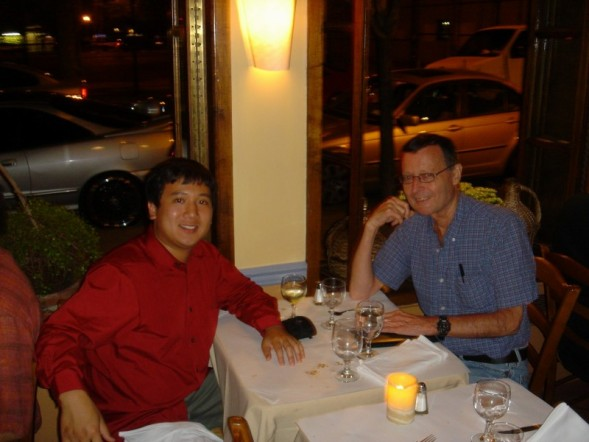
Anderson pictured to the right, May 28, 2007 in New York City

Laurence Desaix Anderson (February 12, 1936 – February 11, 2021) was a career United States Foreign Service officer specializing in East Asian affairs, and served as American Chargé d'Affaires ad interim to Vietnam.

== Career ==
Anderson, a 35-year veteran of the U.S. Foreign Service, spent most of his career working on Asian issues. He was the first envoy to the Socialist Republic of Vietnam, following the establishment of diplomatic relations, serving as chargé d'affaires from August 1995 when the embassy opened until 1997.

Anderson was born in 1936 in Sumner, Mississippi. He received his B.A. in history from Princeton University, and did graduate work in European literature at the University of California at Berkeley. He also served on active duty as an officer in the U.S. Navy from 1958 to 1960, after which he managed his family farm in Mississippi.

He entered the Foreign Service in 1962. His first assignment was in Kathmandu, Nepal, as General Services Officer (1963–64). Anderson was then assigned to Vietnam as an A.I.D. provincial representative and later as an advisor to the revolutionary development programs in Vietnam. Following his assignment to the Vietnam Working Group in the State Department (1965–67), he was assigned as a political officer to the U.S. Embassy in Taipei (1970–73), and afterward to the U.S. Embassy Tokyo (1973–76). After a stint in the Political-Military Bureau, he was assigned as deputy political counselor and chief Indochina watcher in the U.S. Embassy in Bangkok, Thailand (1977–80). He then was named Country Director for Vietnam, Laos, and Kampuchea in the Department of State (1980–83) and subsequently Country Director for Japan (1983–85). He then served as deputy chief of mission in Tokyo under Ambassador Mike Mansfield (1985–89). He was Principal Deputy Assistant Secretary of State for East Asia and Pacific, covering Japan, Korea, China, and Mongolia (1989–92). He was also assigned as a diplomat-in-residence at Princeton and Rutgers Universities, where he lectured and wrote on East Asian political economies (1992–93). He served as the State Department coordinator for the Asia Pacific Economic Cooperation (APEC) ministerial and leaders meetings hosted by President Clinton in Seattle, Washington (1993–94). He subsequently was a senior member for Asia of the Policy Planning Council (1994–95).

Following his service as chargé in Hanoi, Anderson left the Foreign Service in May 1997. He served as State Department Special Envoy on Cambodia in August 1997. He taught on contemporary Asian political economies at the Woodrow Wilson School of Public and International Affairs at Princeton University during the spring semester of 1998. President Clinton appointed Anderson as the executive director of the Korean Peninsula Energy Development Organization (KEDO) from 1997 to 2001.

Anderson has contributed to such publications as "U.S. and Japan: Challenges and Opportunities?" in SAIS Review, summer-fall 1993/volume 13, number 2 and "APEC Focus: Accomplishment and Challenge?" in Pacific Rim Law Review and Policy Journal, University of Washington, Seattle, Washington, spring review, 1995.

The primary historical significance of Anderson's contribution was his instrumental role in restoring formal diplomatic relations between the United States and Vietnam. His most notable assignment was opening the first U.S. Embassy in Hanoi after the Vietnam War, in August 1995. He faced many challenges, however, Vietnam and the US were finally able to restore diplomatic relations.

Before embarking on his mission, Anderson gained insight by meeting with senators John McCain, John Kerry, Bob Kerrey, Thad Cochran, Chuck Robb, Frank Murkowski, Kit Bond, Craig Thomas, and Jay Rockefeller.

Anderson was an executive board member of the Maureen and Mike Mansfield Foundation which is composed of former US Ambassadors to Japan.

Diplomatic posts
New post	Chargé d'Affaires ad interim to Vietnam; 1995–1997	Succeeded by Pete Peterson
