= SwimSafe =

Children's water safety program

SwimSafe is a basic swimming, water safety and rescue program designed specifically for children in low and middle income countries (LMICs) in Asia. It is a public health intervention aimed at preventing drowning. Originally devised to address childhood drowning in Bangladesh, it has been expanded across the region.

== History ==
Childhood drowning is a leading cause of death in low and middle income countries in Asia. Practical barriers to accessing health care including cost and distance have led to the under-reporting of drowning deaths and injury. Many LMICs rely on data from health clinics for their official mortality figures. Because drowning victims rarely present to health facilities in these countries, the rate of drowning has been unknown until relatively recently. In contrast, communicable diseases including cholera and dysentery where families are likely to seek health care during the course of the illness have been significantly better recorded and addressed. A BBC World Service documentary, The Silent Epidemic, which was filmed in Bangladesh and Vietnam, documented the scale of the problem.

SwimSafe was established to address the high levels of drowning across Asia. It began as a research project in 2001, when health prevention experts designed interviews and went from door-to-door in urban and rural areas across five countries. Ultimately more than two million households took part in the research. The results published by UNICEF and The Alliance for Safe Children concluded drowning was a leading cause of death in childhood in Bangladesh, Cambodia, China (Jiangxi Province and the capital, Beijing), Thailand and Vietnam.

Following the conclusion of the first phase of research in 2003 which was focused on Bangladesh, the research leaders began looking for public health interventions to reduce the number of drowning deaths and injuries.

The first SwimSafe program was developed in Bangladesh in 2005 after the 2003 Bangladesh Health and Injury Survey (BHIS) survey showed very high drowning rates, particularly in children. SwimSafe was developed by The Centre for Injury Prevention and Research, Bangladesh, The Alliance for Safe Children and Royal Life Saving Society Australia (RLSSA) with assistance from the Bangladesh Swimming Federation. After consultation between technical experts, there was a one-year pilot of a draft teaching manual in Savar, Dhaka in 2006.

Since 2005, the SwimSafe curriculum has been tested and adapted to suit the cultural and geographical needs of programs in Bangladesh, Vietnam and Thailand.

In 2008 SwimSafe started in Thailand where it was implemented by The Alliance for Safe Children and the Thai Life Saving Society. It was partially funded through a grant from the Australia-Thailand Institute.

SwimSafe Da Nang began in 2009 and was expanded with funding support from AusAID. By the end of 2012, 16,500 children in Da Nang, Vietnam had completed the program.

In Bangladesh, SwimSafe has been in operation since 2005. Initially begun as part of the PRECISE program funded by UNICEF Bangladesh through 2010, it expanded with additional funding from International Inspirations (UK Sport) and AusAID (now known as DFAT). More than 465,000 Bangladeshi children 3–16 years old have now graduated from SwimSafe.

In 2014, SwimSafe in Bangladesh was further adapted to safely train children at higher risk of harm due to health and growth conditions. This began with funding from Grand Challenges Canada. Known as the BASS Project (Bangladesh Anchal and SwimSafe Project) it has been implemented by the University of British Columbia and the International Centre for Drowning Research Bangladesh (IDRCB), with technical assistance from RLSSA and TASC.

== Curriculum ==
SwimSafe employs community-based instructors to teach children how to swim and rescue others. The SwimSafe program consists of 21 lessons of instruction in survival swimming, rescue and resuscitation skills and water safety knowledge. It is taught in a variety of different teaching environments including natural water bodies (ponds, rivers, beaches) above-ground portable pools and in-ground swimming pools.

The initial SwimSafe program was developed solely for use in ponds in rural Bangladesh. SwimSafe version 2 was developed to use other natural water bodies such as rivers and beaches and portable swimming pools.

The most recent (2014) version is SwimSafe version 3. It adds safety and risk management strategies designed to allow high-risk children to be safely included in SwimSafe and adds in-water rescue and resuscitation for older children.

SwimSafe has two levels of certification, Basic and Advanced. The Basic program is for younger children, aged four to six-years-old.

The Advanced program is for children seven years and older. It adds rescue skills aimed at rescuing others and basic life support including CPR. It is important that children at this level are confident in the water and have the mental and physical capacity to perform rescue skills.

The curriculum includes guidelines for swim teaching, logistics, venue management, instructors’ criteria, training details of skill sets and graduation criteria. Of the 21 steps in the manual, water familiarisation features in eight; another eight steps relate to acquisition of different components of swim skills; three steps focus on rescue techniques and another two steps are about acquiring competence as a survival swimmer.

Research has been published in academic journals demonstrating children are successfully using these rescue skills in practice. In 2014, the journal Injury Prevention published a research paper based on interviews with 3890 children who had graduated from the SwimSafe program and concluded the children were frequently using these skills; adults were not involved in any of the reported rescues.

== Ponds and portable swimming pools ==
In many low and middle income countries in Asia there are very few publicly available swimming pools, so alternative venues must be found for water safety lessons.

Two of the alternatives used by SwimSafe are ponds and portable above ground pools.

Ponds are used most commonly in Bangladesh, with bamboo structures defining the teaching area. Being natural water bodies, the ponds have problems with maintenance and water quality and so are mostly used during the rainy season. There is increasingly competition for use of the ponds with commercial fishing operations.

Portable pools (6m by 12.5m) with ladders, sand-filtration systems and chlorination for water sanitation have been used in Thailand, Bangladesh and Vietnam. The portable pools have some practical advantages including controlled water depth and water quality.

== Related programs ==
SwimSafe is part of an integrated package of drowning interventions in communities.

Another key program is the Anchal (crèche) program in Bangladesh which targets children under five. Each Anchal cares for about 30 children (9am and 1pm, six days per week), by providing a safe, health focused, educational environment for as little as few dollars per day. Through these Anchals over 3,725 children are supervised by trained caregivers.

Research has shown children who participated in the Anchal were 82% less likely to drown than those who did not participate in the program.
