= Ted Osius =

American diplomat (born 1961)

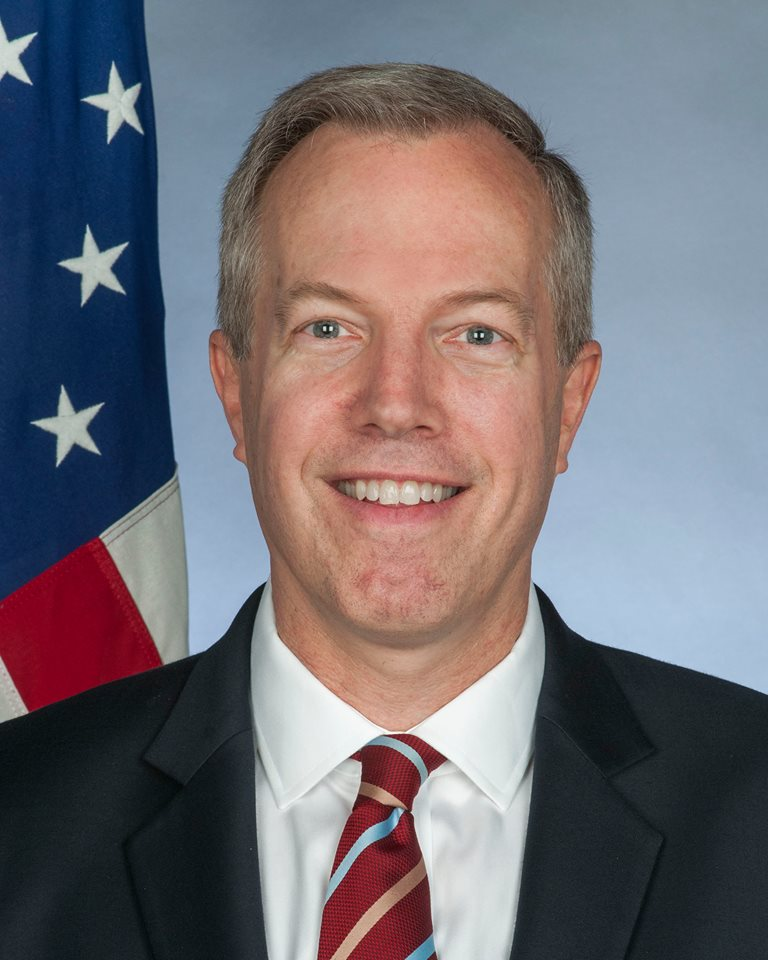

President & CEO of US-ASEAN Business Council
- Incumbent
- Assumed office August 23, 2021
- Preceded by: Alexander C. Feldman

United States Ambassador to Vietnam
- In office December 16, 2014 – November 4, 2017
- President: Barack Obama; Donald Trump
- Deputy: Susan B. Sutton
- Preceded by: David B. Shear
- Succeeded by: Daniel Kritenbrink

Deputy chief of mission at the Embassy of the United States, Jakarta
- In office 2009–2012
- President: Barack Obama
- Succeeded by: Heather Variava

Political Minister-Counselor at the Embassy of the United States, New Delhi
- In office 2006–2009
- President: George W. Bush; Barack Obama

Deputy director of the Office of Korean Affairs in the Bureau of East Asian and Pacific Affairs
- In office 2004–2006
- President: George W. Bush

Regional Environment Officer at the Embassy of the United States, Bangkok
- In office 2001–2004
- President: George W. Bush

Senior Advisor on International Affairs at the Office of the Vice President
- In office 1998–2001
- President: Bill Clinton
- Vice President: Al Gore

Political Officer at the Embassy of the United States, Hanoi
- In office 1996–1998
- President: Bill Clinton

Personal details
- Born: Theodore George Osius III; 1961 (age 64–65) San Francisco, California, United States
- Spouse: Clayton Bond (m. 2006)
- Children: 2
- Education: Harvard University (AB); Johns Hopkins University (MA)

Theodore George Osius III (born 1961) is an American diplomat and the former United States Ambassador to Vietnam.

== Early life and education ==
Osius grew up in Annapolis, Maryland. He attended The Putney School in Vermont, graduating in 1979.

Osius attended Harvard University, where he wrote for The Harvard Crimson and attained a Bachelor of Arts in social studies. After graduating in 1984, he interned at the American University in Cairo for a year. He then worked as a legislative correspondent for Senator Al Gore from 1985 to 1987. Osius later attended the Paul H. Nitze School of Advanced International Studies at Johns Hopkins University, graduating with a Master of Arts in international economics and U.S. foreign policy in 1989.

In addition to English, Osius speaks Vietnamese, French and Italian, as well as a bit of Arabic, Hindi, Thai, Japanese, and Indonesian.

== Career ==
Osius joined the U.S. Foreign Service in 1989. Osius' first assignment was in Manila, from 1989 to 1991. Other early assignments included Vatican City and the United Nations.

In 1996, Osius was among the first U.S. diplomats to work in Vietnam since the end of the Vietnam War. In 1997, he helped with the establishment of the U.S. consulate in Ho Chi Minh City. In 1998 Osius returned to advise Vice President Al Gore on Asian affairs. In 2001, Osius became regional environmental affairs officer at the U.S. embassy in Bangkok, Thailand. In 2004, he returned to Washington, D.C. to work as the deputy director of the Office of Korean Affairs in the Bureau of East Asian and Pacific Affairs. In 2008, Osius was assigned to New Delhi, India as political minister-counselor.

In 2009, Osius became the deputy chief of mission at the U.S. embassy in Jakarta, Indonesia.

Osius returned again to Washington in 2012 to work as a senior fellow at the Center for Strategic and International Studies. In 2013, he became an associate professor at National Defense University.

In May 2014, Osius was nominated by President Barack Obama to be U.S. ambassador to Vietnam. Osius was confirmed by the U.S. Senate in November 2014. As ambassador, Osius presented his credentials on December 16, 2014.

== Personal life ==
Osius is openly gay. In 2004, Osius met his future husband, Clayton Bond, then a watch officer in the State Department's operations center, at a meeting of Gays and Lesbians in Foreign Affairs Agencies. They were married in 2006 in Vancouver, Canada. He and Bond have adopted two children, a son and a daughter.

== See also ==
- List of LGBT ambassadors of the United States

Diplomatic posts
| Preceded by David B. Shear | United States Ambassador to Vietnam; 2014–2017 | Succeeded by Daniel Kritenbrink |
