= Raymond Burghardt =

American diplomat (born 1945)

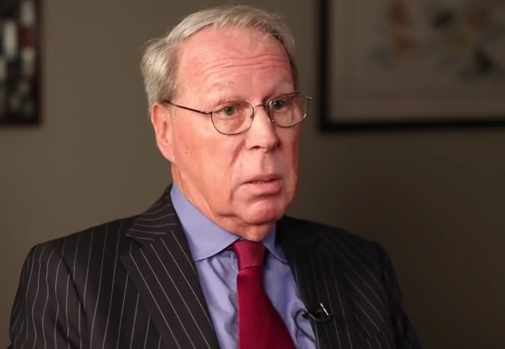
- Raymond F. Burghardt in an interview by Voice of America, 2016.

United States Ambassador to Vietnam
- In office February 5, 2002 – September 5, 2004
- President: George W. Bush
- Preceded by: Pete Peterson
- Succeeded by: Michael W. Marine

Director of American Institute in Taiwan
- In office 1999–2001
- President: Bill Clinton; George W. Bush
- Preceded by: Darryl N. Johnson
- Succeeded by: Douglas H. Paal

Chairman of American Institute in Taiwan
- In office February 2006 – October 2016
- President: George W. Bush; Barack Obama
- Preceded by: William Andreas Brown
- Succeeded by: James F. Moriarty

Personal details
- Born: Raymond F. Burghardt Jr. 1945 (age 80–81) New York, New York, United States
- Education: Columbia College

Raymond Burghardt (born 1945) is an American diplomat who served as the United States Ambassador to Vietnam from 2002 to 2004, Director (1999-2001) as well as Chairman of American Institute in Taiwan from 2006 to 2016.

== Biography ==
Burghardt was born in New York City in 1945 and was raised in the New York metropolitan area. He graduated from Columbia College in 1967.

In 1985, Burghardt was nominated by President Ronald Reagan to serve as Special Assistant to the President for National Security Affairs, replacing Constantine Menges as Senior Director of Latin American Affairs on the National Security Council staff.

Prior to his posting to Taiwan, Burghardt was Consul General in Shanghai from 1997 to 1999 and served as the U.S. Government's chief interlocutor with the late Wang Daohan, the People's Republic of China’s lead negotiator with Taiwan. He was appointed on November 28, 2001 to be the second United States Ambassador to Vietnam, replacing Pete Peterson.

From February 2006 to October 2016, he served as the Chairman of the Board of Trustees of the American Institute in Taiwan. He concurrently served as Director of East-West Seminars at the East-West Center in Honolulu, Hawaii from 2006 to 2012.

He is one of the few diplomats who was a serving Foreign Service Officer when the United States derecognized the Republic of China in 1979 and remains a skeptic of the validity of the 1992 Consensus. As outgoing AIT chairman, he also called for "creativity" and "flexibility" in dealing with the political impasse in cross-strait relations.

Burghardt is able to speak Vietnamese, Mandarin Chinese, and Spanish.

Burghardt was awarded the Order of Propitious Clouds in 2008.
