= Melvin Williams (admiral) =

American admiral

Melvin G. Williams Jr.
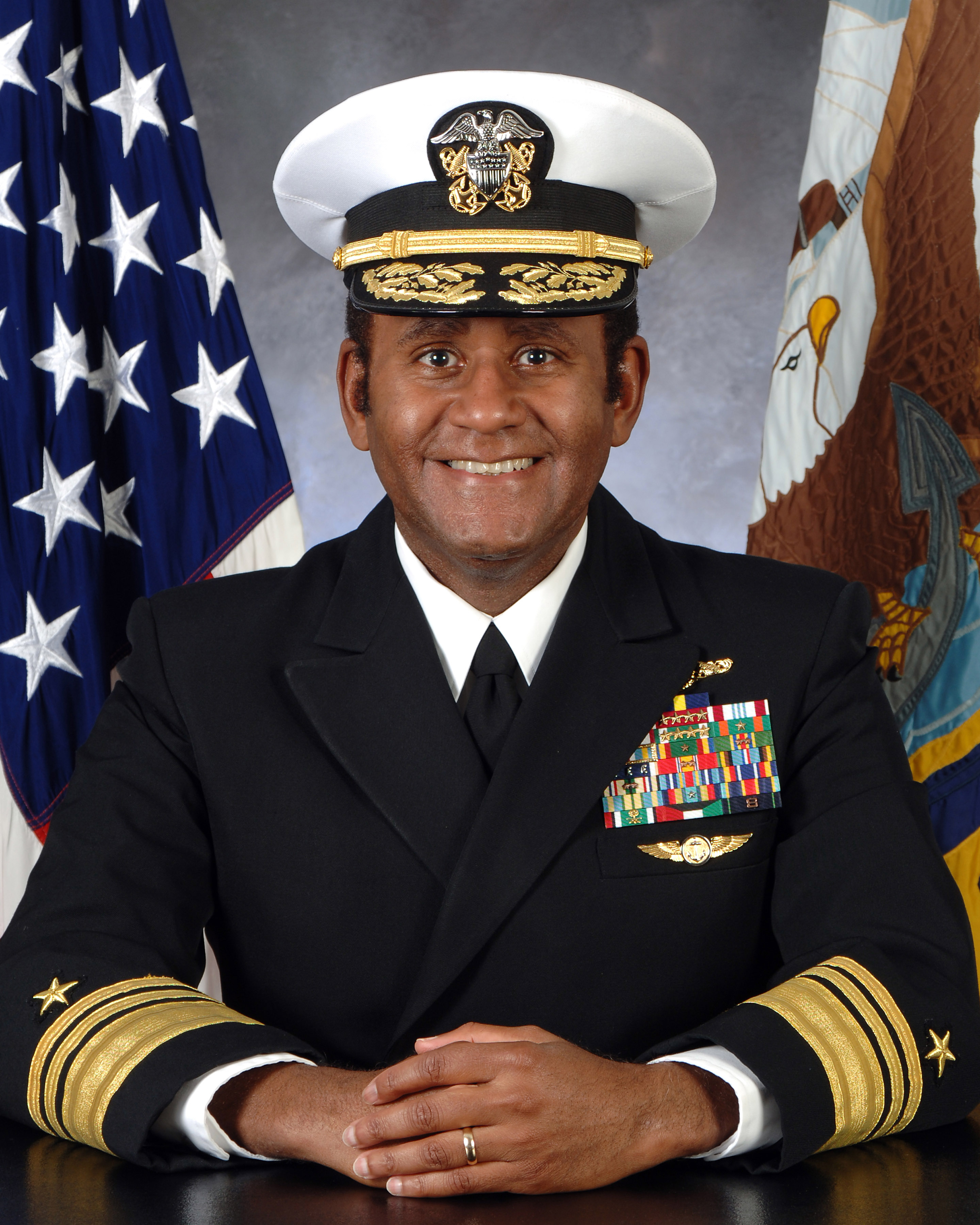
- VADM (ret.) Melvin G. Williams Jr.
- Born: November 3, 1955 (age 70); San Diego, California, U.S.
- Military career
- Allegiance: United States
- Service years: 1978–2010
- Rank: Vice Admiral
- Commands: U.S. Second Fleet Submarine Group 9 Submarine Squadron 4 USS Nebraska (SSBN-739)

Vice Admiral Melvin Gene Williams Jr. (born November 3, 1955) is an American retired officer in the United States Navy. He is the former Commander, U.S. Second Fleet and former director, Combined Joint Operations from the Sea Center of Excellence.

After military service, Williams served for two years as a Presidential Appointee at the US Department of Energy. He was the Associate Deputy Secretary of Energy; 2011-2013- responsible for day-to-day Management and Operations of the Department of Energy (reporting to the Secretary and the Deputy Secretary of Energy).

Since 2013, he has served in academia, and has been designated as a Joint Service Officer (JSO).

He and his father are the only pair of African Americans wherein the father reached a top enlisted rank and the son a top officer rank.

== Biography ==
=== Early life and education ===
Vice Admiral Williams was born in San Diego, California and raised in Washington, DC. His father, Master Chief Melvin G. Williams, Sr., also served in the United States Navy (1951-1978). Chief Williams served aboard submarines, aircraft carriers, and other surface ships. Chief Williams would go on to meet then-Chief of Naval Operations Admiral Elmo Zumwalt and highlight continued discriminatory practices in the Steward's Branch of the Navy, practices Zumwalt would later end.

Williams attended the U.S. Naval Academy at Annapolis, Maryland, graduating in 1978 with a degree in Mathematics. In 1984, he earned a Master's degree in Engineering at The Catholic University of America.

=== Military career ===
A nuclear trained submariner aboard the USS Jack (SSN 605) where he served with the future CEO of AT&T, RM2(SS) William Hannigan, Vice Admiral Williams served in the U.S. Navy for thirty-two years as a commissioned officer and one year as an enlisted sailor. He was selected for Flag rank in 2002. His extensive operational assignments included four Command opportunities, including Commander of U.S. Second Fleet (130 ships and over 90,000 sailors and marines) which responded with humanitarian assistance and disaster relief following the devastating earthquake in Haiti in January 2010, Commander of Submarine Group Nine (12 submarines and over 4,000 sailors), Commander of Submarine Squadron Four (6 submarines and their crews), and Commanding Officer of USS Nebraska (SSBN-739) (Gold Crew) - an Ohio-class Strategic Ballistic Missile submarine which was selected as the Top Strategic Mission Performer in the Nation.

Other key operational assignments included Deputy Commander, U.S. Fleet Forces, Director of Global Operations at U.S. Strategic Command, Executive Officer on USS Louisville (SSN-724) during initial combat operations for Operation Desert Storm, Chief of Staff for the KITTY HAWK Carrier Strike Group during initial combat operations for Operation Enduring Freedom following the 9/11 Attack on the United States.

He is also the co-author (with his father) of the leadership book "Navigating the Seven Seas", which in 2012 was designated by the U.S. Navy as one of the 18 books determined to be "essential reading" for all members who serve in the Navy.

=== U.S. Department of Energy ===
In 2011, Williams received a Presidential Appointment as Associate Deputy Secretary in the Department of Energy (DOE). There, he reported directly to the Secretary of Energy and Deputy Secretary of Energy as he executed his mission to further DOE effectiveness and operational excellence.

=== Operation GW VALOR ===
In 2013, Williams joined The George Washington University to lead the Office of Military and Veterans Affairs. There, Williams was responsible for serving and supporting GW student military members, their families, and veterans to accelerate learning opportunities and rewards while working with university senior leadership, students, alumni, and other stakeholders to maximize access and affordability for the military community at GW. GW VALOR under Associate Provost Williams provided strategic-level leadership, close student services and support, and oversight of the Naval Reserve Officer Training Corps program at GW. Williams left GW VALOR in 2016 for a position at UC Davis.

== The Catholic University of America ==
Williams is a former associate dean of the School of Engineering at The Catholic University of America. In 2023, he joined the university's board of trustees.

== Personal life ==
Williams and his family are longtime residents of the greater Washington, D.C. area.

== Education ==
- U.S. Naval Academy - 1978 (B.S. Mathematics)
- Naval Nuclear Propulsion and Submarine Officer Training - 1979
- Catholic University - 1984 (M.S. Engineering)
- Joint Maritime Tactics Course - 1999
- National Defense University CAPSTONE Military Leadership Program - 2002
- Naval Postgraduate School Executive Business Course - 2003
- Harvard University, Harvard Kennedy School Senior Executive Program in National and International Security - 2005

== Awards and decorations ==
=== Military Awards ===
Navy Distinguished Service Medal (two awards);

Defense Superior Service Medal;

- Legion of Merit (five awards)
- Defense Meritorious Service Medal
- Meritorious Service Medal
- Navy and Marine Corps Commendation Medal (five awards)
- Navy and Marine Corps Achievement Medal (two awards)

=== Other awards ===
The Catholic University of America 2012 Engineering Distinguished Alumni Award The Black Engineer of the Year Award for Professional Achievement as well as induction into the STEM Hall of Fame in 2011 The National Society of Black Engineers Award for Lifetime Achievement in Government The Thurgood Marshall Award for Service and Leadership

- Defense Mapping Agency Outstanding Personnel of the Year

=== Civil awards ===
In 2019, the Engineering department at his alma mater, CUA, dedicated a lab in his honor.

Insignia of a United States Vice Admiral

== See also ==
- United States Fleet Forces Command
- United States Strategic Command
- United States Navy
