= Michael W. Marine =

American diplomat (born 1947)

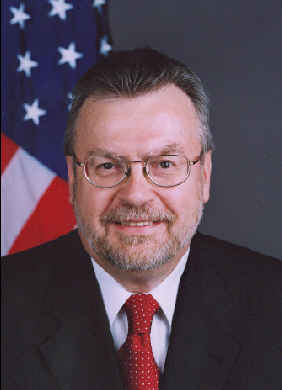

United States Ambassador to Vietnam
- In office September 10, 2004 – August 10, 2007
- President: George W. Bush
- Preceded by: Raymond Burghardt
- Succeeded by: Michael W. Michalak

Personal details
- Born: October 3, 1947 (age 78) New York City, U.S.
- Spouse: Married
- Education: University of California, Santa Barbara

Military service
- Allegiance: United States
- Branch/service: United States Marine Corps
- Years of service: 1967–1971
- Rank: Captain

Michael W. Marine (born October 3, 1947) is an American diplomat in Washington, D.C. He served in Suva (1993–1994), Fiji (1991–1993), Bonn (1994–1995), Moscow (1995–1997), Nairobi, Beijing (September 2000 – June 2004), Vietnam (2004–2007).

== Early life ==
Born in New York City, New York in 1947, Marine enlisted in the U.S. Marine Corps in 1967 and completed his service with the rank of captain in 1971. Mr. Marine received a BA in Chinese history, summa cum laude, from University of California, Santa Barbara in 1974 and entered the Foreign Service in 1975. His initial postings were as a consular officer in Martinique, Embassy in London, and Consulate General in Guangzhou (1979–1981), and as a political officer in Consulate General in Hong Kong (1982–1985). His foreign languages are French, Mandarin Chinese and German. He received the State Department's Superior Honor Award in 1981, 1990, 1993, 1999, 2001 and 2002.

== Career ==
Marine was Deputy Chief of Mission (DCM) at the United States Embassy in Beijing, China from September 2000 to June 2004. He was DCM at the Embassy in Nairobi, Kenya from August 1997 to June 2000. In the wake of the devastating August 1998 terrorist attack on Embassy Nairobi, he served as Chargé d'Affaires, a.i. (CDA) there, from May 1999 until September 1999. He was Minister Counselor for Consular Affairs (MCCA) at Embassy Moscow from 1995 to 1997 and MCCA at Embassy Bonn from 1994 to 1995. From 1991 to January 1993, he was DCM at Embassy Suva, Fiji. From February 1993 until April 1994, he served as CDA at Embassy Suva. From 1985 until 1991, Mr. Marine served in a series of jobs at the Department of State in Washington, D.C. He was Director of the Office of Fraud Prevention Programs in the Bureau of Consular Affairs, Deputy Director of the Bureau of East Asia and the Pacific's Office of Vietnam, Laos and Cambodia Affairs, and Special Assistant in the Bureau of Consular Affairs.

== Personal life ==
Marine and his wife have two daughters.
