= The Alliance for Safe Children =

Non-profit organization

- Founded: 2002
- Founder: Pete Peterson
- Purpose: Preventable injury in developing world
- Location(s): Vienna, Virginia; Bangkok, Thailand
- Region served: Asia
- Method: Campaigning, building collaborative networks, education, research
- Key people: Michael Linnon (technical director)
- Website: http://stopdrowning.org/

The Alliance for Safe Children (TASC) is a non-profit organization formed in 2002 to address the issue of child injury in the developing world. Pete Peterson, former United States Ambassador to Vietnam, is the founder of the organization. Michael Linnon is the technical director.

TASC works in cooperation with other organizations, such as the Red Cross and UNICEF. Its aims include raising awareness of child injury; promoting injury prevention programs; conducting and supporting research; and raising funds and creating alliances with NGOs, international organisations and governments so that the number of child injuries can be reduced.

TASC's objectives are driven in part by studies suggesting that far more children die from preventable injury than from infectious disease. According to UNICEF, about one million children die of preventable injuries each year.

== Research ==
In 2008 the results of their seven-year study were published in a report that indicated that suffocation and drowning were the most easily preventable causes of death for children under five years of age.

== International Drowning Research Centre ==
Since 2005, TASC has assisted organizations in providing swimming lessons for children in Bangladesh. With help from the Australian government, TASC partnered with the Royal Life Saving Society Australia, in establishing an International Drowning Research Centre based in Dhaka and opened in August 2010. In Bangladesh, an estimated 46 children drown each day, and four times as many nearly drown. The aim is to teach children, especially those from poorer sections of society, how to swim, with the focus being on teaching older children "who can not only save themselves but can also help others." The centre also teaches cardiopulmonary resuscitation and basic rescue skills.

== See also ==
- List of non-governmental organizations in Vietnam
- National Child Passenger Safety Board
