= Marc Knapper =

American diplomat

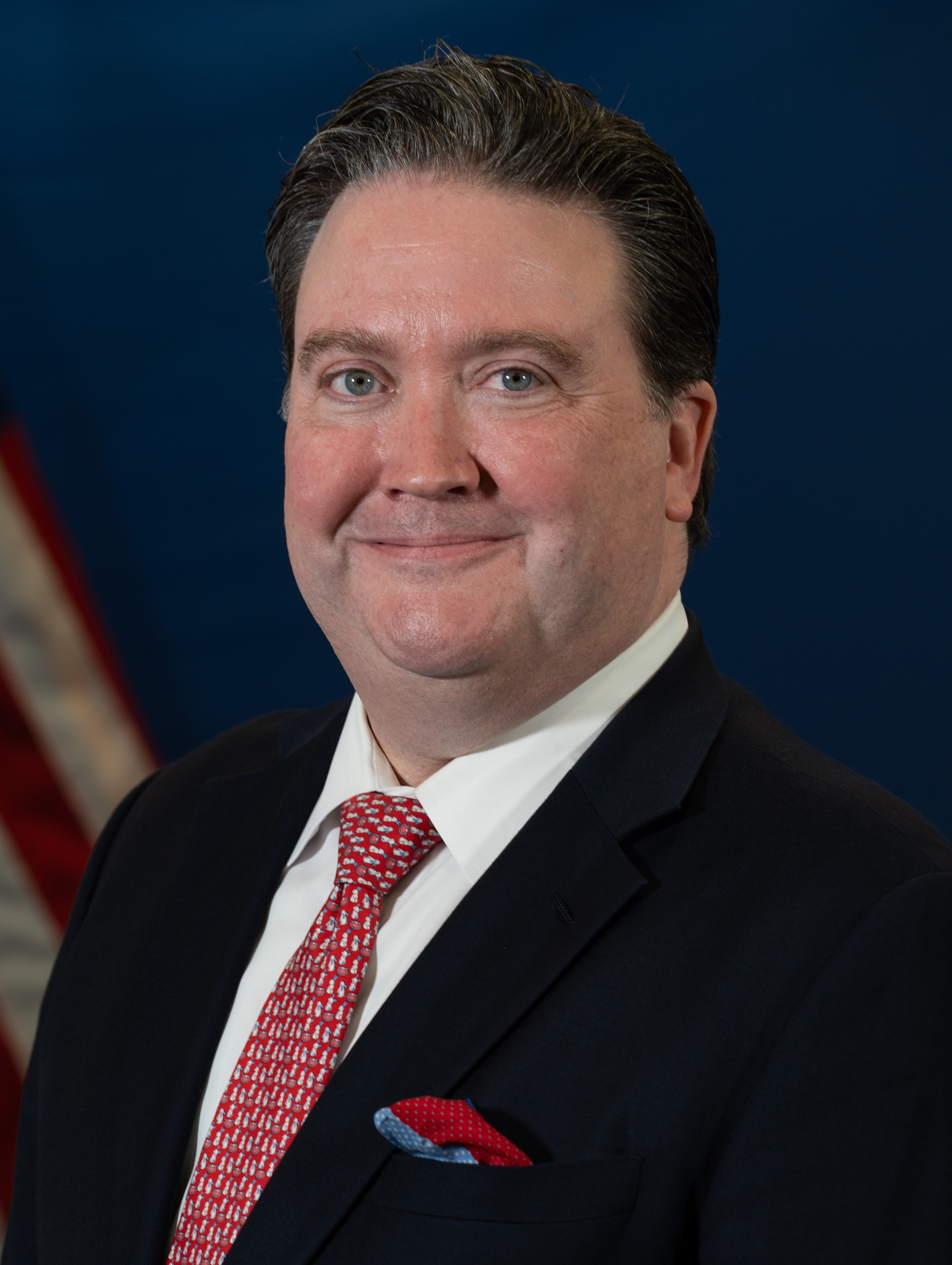

United States Ambassador to Vietnam
- In office February 11, 2022 – January 18, 2026
- President: Joe Biden; Donald Trump
- Preceded by: Daniel Kritenbrink
- Succeeded by: Jennifer Wicks McNamara

Chargé d’Affaires ad interim of South Korea
- In office January 20, 2017 – July 7, 2018
- President: Donald Trump
- Preceded by: Mark Lippert
- Succeeded by: Harry B. Harris Jr.

Personal details
- Education: Princeton University (BA); Army War College (MA)

Marc Evans Knapper is an American diplomat who had served as the United States Ambassador to Vietnam.

== Education ==
Knapper earned his Bachelor of Arts from Princeton University and his Master of Arts from the Army War College.

== Career ==
Knapper is a career member of the Senior Foreign Service, class of Minister-Counselor. He previously served as the chargé d’affaires of the U.S. embassy in Seoul, South Korea and, prior to that, was the embassy’s deputy chief of mission. Earlier, Knapper was director of the State Department’s Office of India Affairs and director of the State Department’s office of Japanese Affairs. From 2004 to 2007, he was political affairs counselor at the U.S. embassy in Hanoi. His other assignments include leadership positions in the U.S. Embassy in Baghdad, Iraq, and the U.S. Embassy in Tokyo, Japan. From August 1, 2018 until July 12, 2021, Knapper served as Deputy Assistant Secretary for Korea and Japan.

=== Ambassador to Vietnam ===
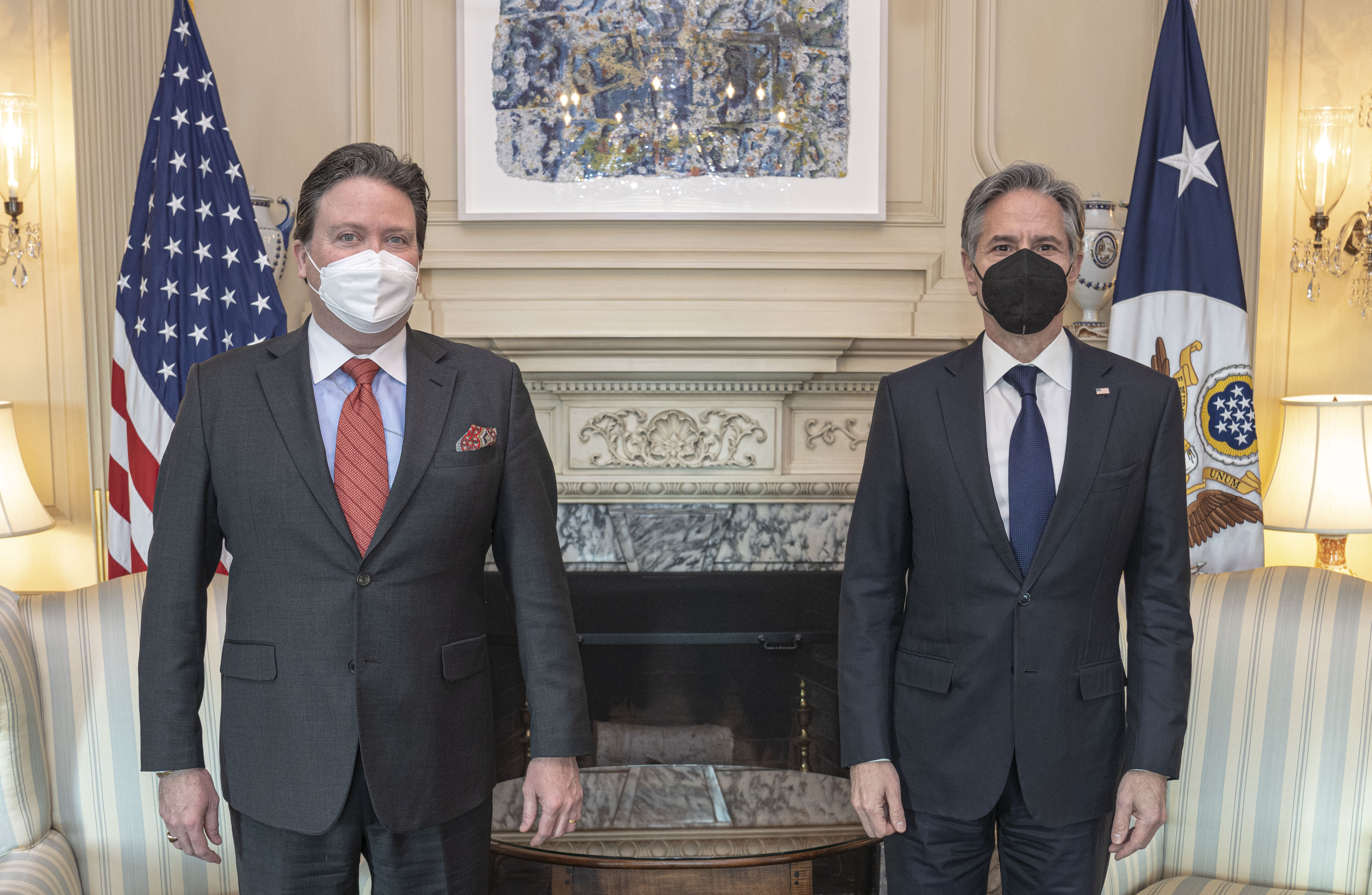
Knapper with Secretary of State Antony Blinken in January 2022

On April 15, 2021, President Joe Biden nominated Knapper to be the next United States Ambassador to Vietnam. Hearings on his nomination were held before the Senate Foreign Relations Committee on his nomination on July 13, 2021. The committee favorably reported his nomination to the Senate floor on August 4, 2021. Knapper was confirmed by the Senate by voice vote on December 18, 2021. He was sworn into office on January 3, 2022.

Knapper arrived to Vietnam on January 27, 2022 and presented his credentials to president Nguyễn Xuân Phúc on February 11.

Since assuming his role as U.S. Ambassador to Vietnam, Knapper has strengthened U.S.-Vietnam relations, including elevating bilateral ties to a Comprehensive Strategic Partnership. This milestone paved the way for deeper collaboration across sectors, bolstering American interests. Knapper has worked to fortify high-tech supply chains by fostering partnerships between U.S. universities, such as Arizona State University, and Vietnamese institutions. He advanced U.S. security objectives by promoting defense cooperation, including the transfer of training aircraft and facilitating opportunities for American defense manufacturers to support Vietnam’s modernization. Additionally, his efforts in renewable energy negotiations attracted investments benefiting U.S. businesses. These initiatives effectively advance American prosperity and stability in the Indo-Pacific.

=== After ambassadorship ===
After his term as an ambassador in January 2026, Knapper works at a consultancy firm in AI safety for national governments called ADEN (AI Diplomatic Engagement Network).

== Recognition ==
Knapper is the recipient of numerous awards, including the Secretary of State’s Distinguished Service award, the State Department’s Linguist of the Year award, and a Presidential Rank award.

== Personal life ==
Knapper speaks Japanese, Korean and Vietnamese. He and his wife, Suzuko, have a son, Alexander.

== Bibliography ==
He has wrote several op-eds in the Vietnamese newspaper VnExpress during and after ambassadorship.

- Knapper, Marc (September 22, 2022). "Tấm bản đồ cũ" [The old map]. VnExpress.
- Knapper, Marc (November 17, 2026). "Ván cược AI Việt Nam 'hậu Jensen Huang'" [Vietnamese AI bet 'after Jensen Huang']. VnExpress.
- Knapper, Marc (November 23, 2026). "Việt Nam và cơ hội định hình an toàn AI" [Vietnam and the chance to shape AI safety]. VnExpress.

== See also ==
- List of ambassadors of the United States

Diplomatic posts
| Preceded by Daniel Kritenbrink | United States Ambassador to Vietnam; 2022–2026 | Succeeded by Jennifer Wicks McNamara |
