= Michael W. Michalak =

American diplomat (born 1946)

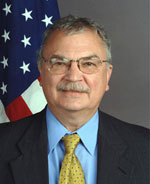
- Office Portrait as State Department

United States Ambassador to Vietnam
- In office August 10, 2007 – February 14, 2011
- President: George W. Bush; Barack Obama
- Preceded by: Michael W. Marine
- Succeeded by: David B. Shear

Personal details
- Born: 1946 (age 79–80) Detroit, Michigan, U.S.
- Spouse: Married
- Education: Catholic University School of Engineering, Oakland University, Harvard Kennedy School, The Catholic University of America

Michael Walter Michalak (born 1946) is the former career Foreign Service officer and United States Ambassador to Vietnam from 2007 to 2011. He currently serves as Senior Vice President and Regional Managing Director for the US-ASEAN Business Council.

== Career ==
Born in Detroit, Michigan, Michalak received a Bachelor of Science degree from Oakland University in Rochester, Michigan, and Master of Science degree in physics from The Catholic University of America in Washington, D.C. He received a second master's degree in public administration from the John F. Kennedy School of Government at Harvard University in Cambridge, Massachusetts.

After joining the Foreign Service, Michalak has served in different posts and agencies, including:

- Commercial Officer at U.S. Consulate General in Sydney, Australia (1974–1977);
- Financial Economist, Economic Section, U.S. Embassy in Islamabad, Pakistan (1977–1981);
- Economic Officer at Asia Bureau Regional Affairs Office (1981–1982) and Economic Officer at Japan Desk (1982–1986) in Washington D.C.;
- Chief of Bilateral Trade Unit at U.S. Embassy in Tokyo, Japan (1986–1991);
- Deputy Chief of Economic Section at U.S. Embassy in Beijing, China (1991–1993);
- Deputy Director of Economics at the Office of China and Mongolian Affairs (1993–1996) and
- Deputy Coordinator at the Office of Eastern European Assistance (1996–1997) in Washington D.C., and as Senior Advisor at the National Center for APEC in Seattle, Washington (1997–2000).

He was the U.S. Senior Official to APEC from November 2005 until his appointment as Ambassador to Vietnam. Prior to the APEC responsibility, he served again at the U.S. Embassy Tokyo, as Minister-Counselor of the Economic Section (2000–2004) and Deputy Chief of Mission (2004–2005). In February 2011 he assumed the position of Senior Advisor to the Private Sector Host Committee for APEC 2011.

Michalak has worked for the United States Department of State for over 30 years and is the recipient of a group award for valor for his actions in time of crisis when the U.S. Embassy Islamabad was burned down.

Diplomatic posts
Preceded by Michael W. Marine	U.S. Ambassador to Vietnam; 2007–February 2011	Succeeded by David Shear
