= Jennifer Wicks McNamara =

American diplomat

Jennifer Wicks
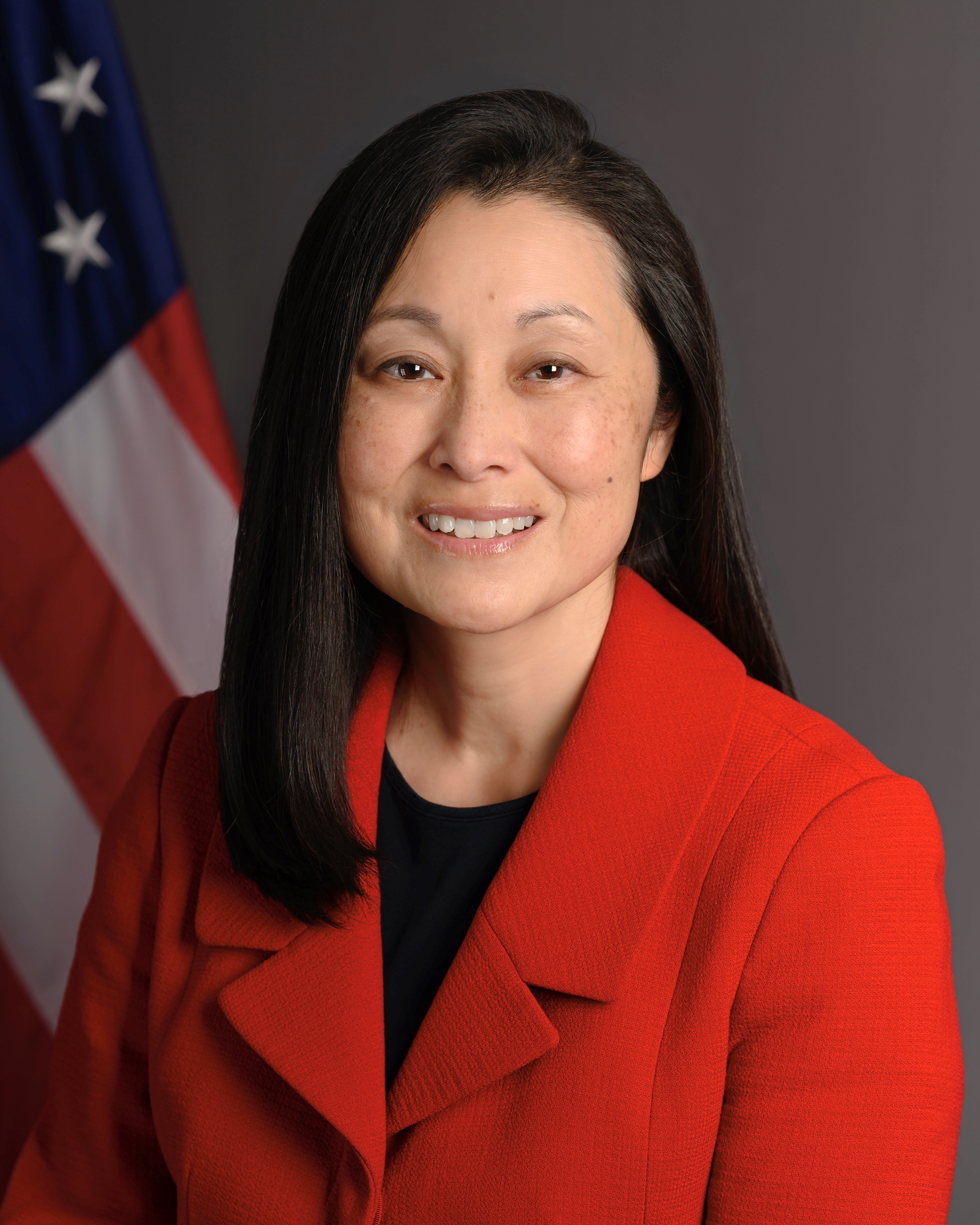
- Official portrait, 2026

United States Ambassador to Vietnam
- Incumbent
- Assumed office July 6, 2026
- President: Donald Trump
- Preceded by: Marc Knapper

Director of the Office of Presidential Appointments
- In office November 2012 – June 2026
- President: Barack Obama; Donald Trump; Joe Biden; Donald Trump

Jennifer Wicks McNamara is an American diplomat who serves as the incumbent United States ambassador to Vietnam. Having her nomination confirmed on 18 May 2026 and she presented her credentials to the President of Vietnam on 6 July 2026, she is the first woman to hold the post.

== Career ==
In her nominee statement to the Senate Committee on Foreign Relations on 11 December 2025, Wicks McNamara stated that Vietnam is one of the most important partners of the U.S. in the region, and "a strong, independent, and resilient Vietnam is in the United States’ interest". Wicks McNamara also noted that Vietnam has provided critical assistance for the American war legacy programs, including the repatriation of U.S. soldiers’ remains, and that she would support the continuation of such war legacy programs.

Since November 2012, Wicks has served as the Director of the Office of Presidential Appointments, serving four U.S. administrations, and as a career Civil Service employee with nearly 31 years of experience in the U.S. government.
