= Bureau of European and Eurasian Affairs =

U.S. State Department division

- Seal of the United States Department of State

Bureau overview
- Formed: 1983; 43 years ago
- Preceding bureau: Bureau of European Affairs
- Jurisdiction: Executive branch of the United States
- Headquarters: Harry S. Truman Building, Washington, D.C., United States
- Employees: 11,906 (as of 2011)
- Annual budget: $604 million (FY 2010)
- Bureau executive: Brendan Hanrahan, Assistant Secretary of State for European and Eurasian Affairs
- Parent department: U.S. Department of State
- Website: state.gov/eur

The Bureau of European and Eurasian Affairs (EUR) is part of the United States Department of State, charged with implementing U.S. foreign policy and promoting U.S. interests in Europe and Eurasia (which it defines as being Europe, Turkey, Cyprus, the Caucasus Region, and Russia), as well as advising the Under Secretary of State for Political Affairs. It is headed by the Assistant Secretary of State for European and Eurasian Affairs.

From 1949 to 1983, European affairs were within the purview of the Bureau of European Affairs.

== Organization ==
The offices of the Bureau of European and Eurasian Affairs direct, coordinate, and supervise U.S. government activities within the region, including political, economic, consular, public diplomacy, and administrative management issues.

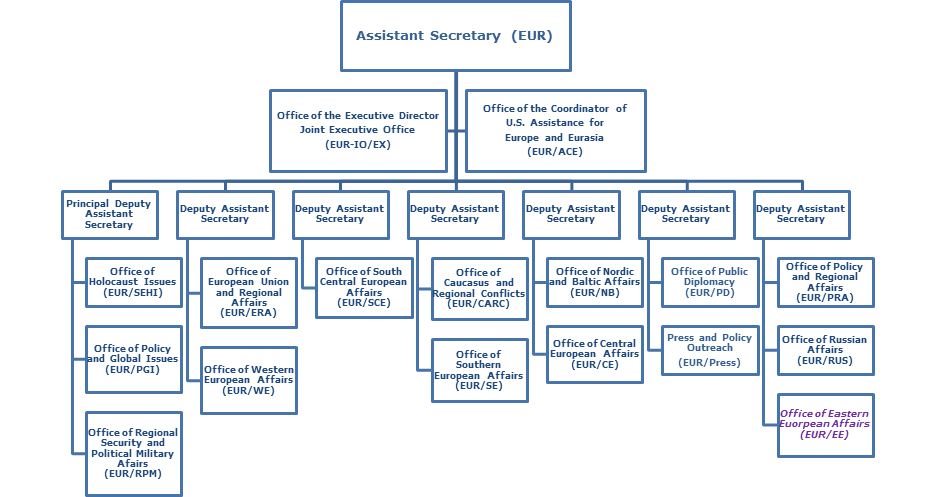
Organizational chart for the Bureau of European and Eurasian Affairs as of 2014

- Front Office
- Office of Russian Affairs and the Caucasus – Responsible for Russia, Belarus, Armenia, Azerbaijan, and Georgia
- Office of Eastern and Central European Affairs – Responsible for Ukraine, Moldova, Poland, Romania, and Bulgaria
- Office of West Central European Affairs – Responsible for Albania, Bosnia and Herzegovina, Croatia, Kosovo, Montenegro, North Macedonia, Serbia, Slovakia, Slovenia, Hungary, Switzerland, Liechtenstein, the Czech Republic, and Austria
- Office of Southern European Affairs – Responsible for Cyprus, Greece, Turkey, Spain, Portugal, and Malta
- Office of Western European Affairs – Responsible for Andorra, Belgium, France, Germany, the Holy See/Vatican City, Ireland, Italy, Luxembourg, Monaco, the Netherlands, San Marino, and the United Kingdom
- Office of European Union and Regional Affairs
- Office of European Security and Political Affairs – Coordinates policy on U.S. security interests, as well as policy regarding NATO, the Organization for Security and Co-operation in Europe, and European contributions to multinational military operations
- Office of Policy and Global Issues – Responsible for policy formulation and substantive expertise about global issues within the EUR region; strategic planning; and Congressional relations
- Office of Press and Public Diplomacy – Coordinates media engagement and public outreach, and prepares press guidance for the Department Spokesperson
- Office of the Coordinator for U.S. Assistance to Europe and Eurasia
- Office of the Special Envoy for Holocaust Issues
- Joint Executive Office – Oversees the bureau's human resources; shared with the Bureau of International Organization Affairs
