= List of ambassadors of the United States to APEC =

United States diplomatic position

United States Senior Official for Asia-Pacific Economic Cooperation
- Seal of the United States Department of State

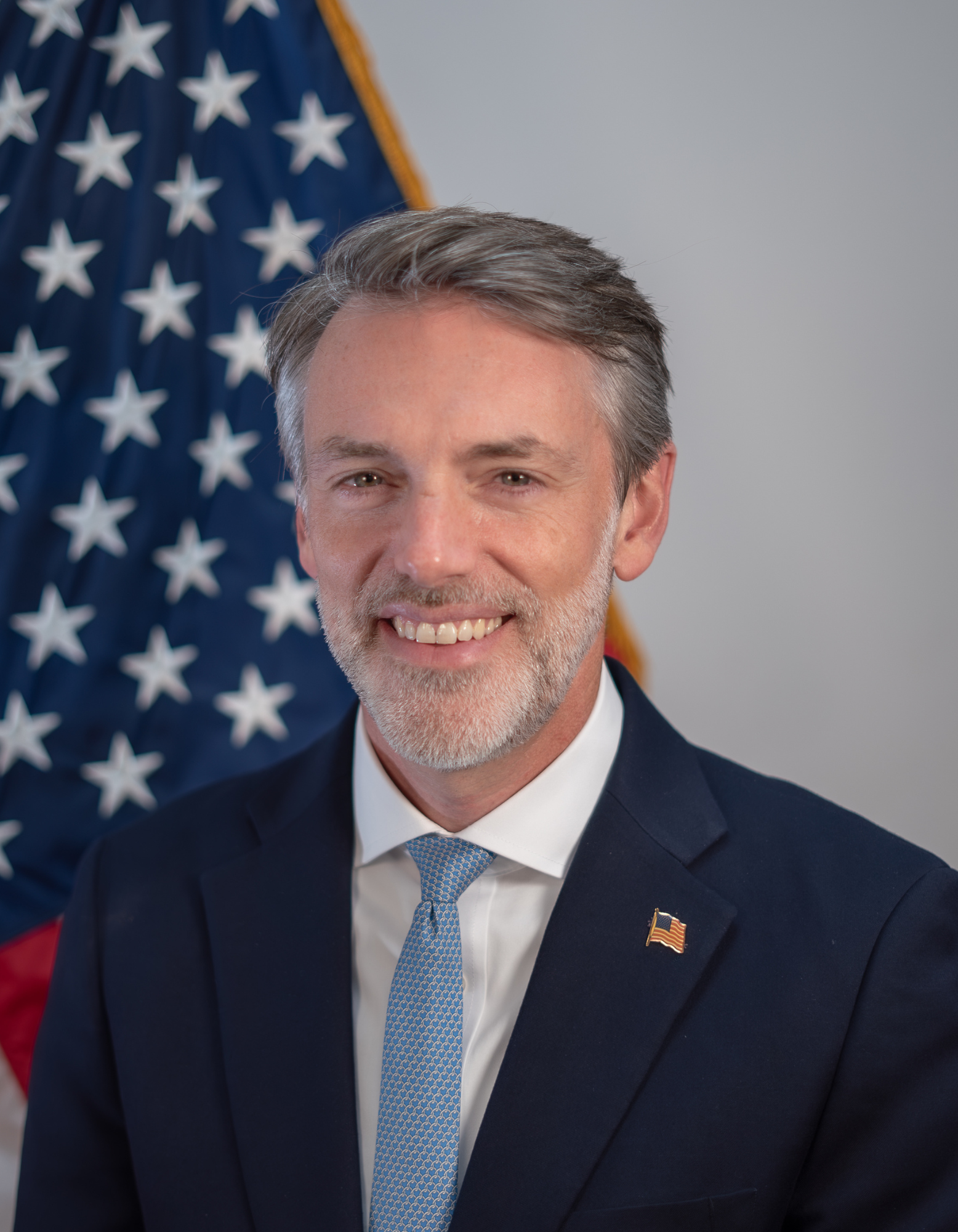
- Incumbent; Casey Mace since August 7, 2025
- Reports to: Assistant Secretary of State for East Asian and Pacific Affairs
- Appointer: President of the United States
- Term length: No fixed term At the pleasure of the president of the United States

The following is a list of U.S. ambassadors to APEC. The formal title is United States Senior Official for Asia-Pacific Economic Cooperation with the rank of Ambassador during tenure of service. Previously, the role has also been called United States Coordinator for APEC.

== List of U.S. Ambassadors to APEC and U.S. Senior Officials for APEC ==
Ambassador	Image	Assumed office	Left office
Sandra J. Kristoff		1995	1996
John S. Wolf		February 1997	1999
Richard A. Boucher		1999	2000
C. Lawrence Greenwood		2000	2003
Lauren Moriarty		2003	2005
Michael W. Michalak		2005	2007
Patricia M. Haslach		June 11, 2007	2009
Kurt W. Tong		September 2009	November 2011
Atul Keshap		July 2012	August 2013
Robert S. Wang		August 2013	2015
Matthew J. Matthews		June 16, 2015	2019
Sandra Oudkirk		July 6, 2019	July 12, 2021
Matt Murray		February 2022	July 2025
Casey Mace		August 7, 2025	present
