= Trường Sơn Cemetery =

Military cemetery in Vietnam

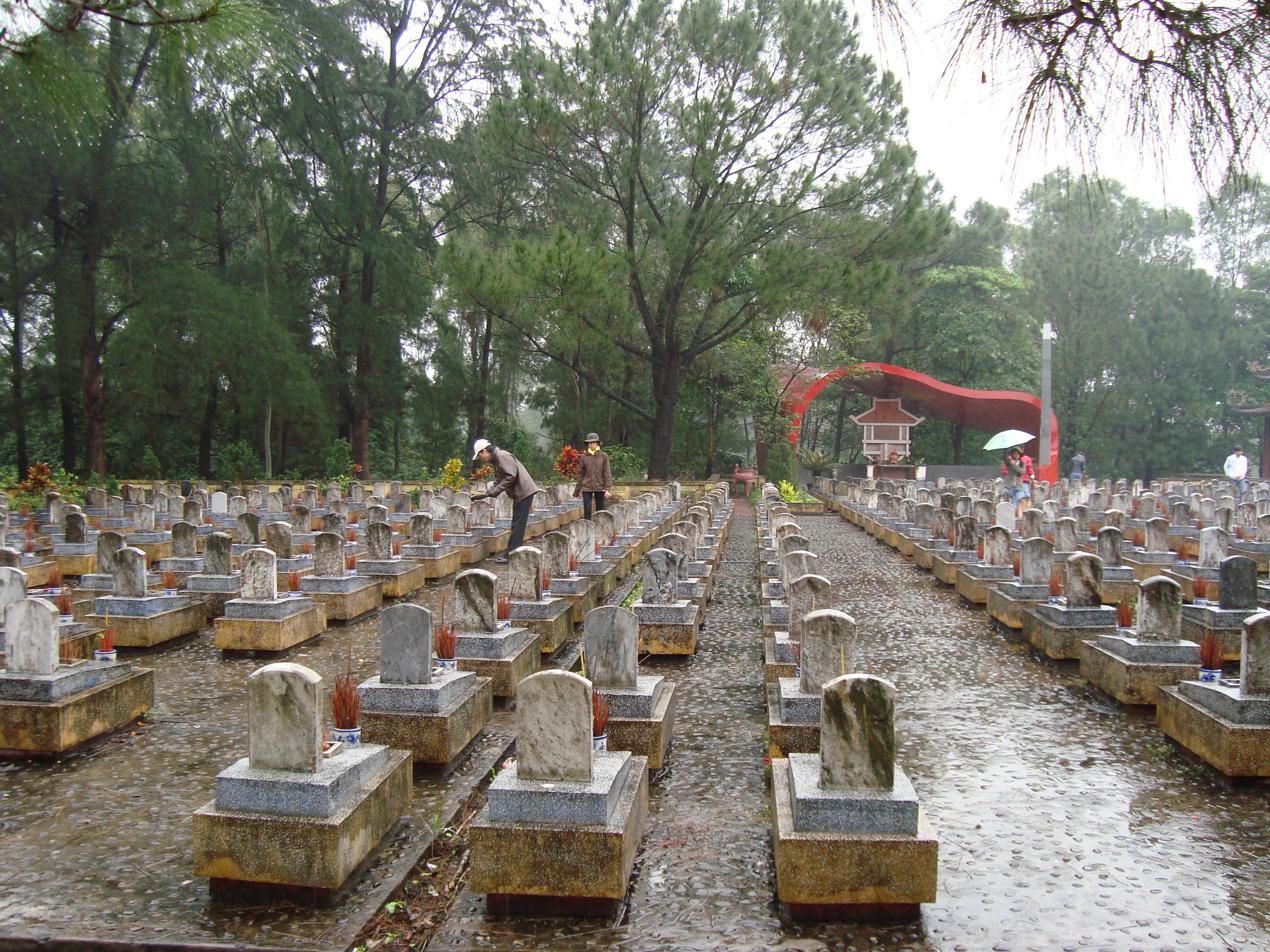
- Interactive map of Trường Sơn Cemetery

Details
- Country: Vietnam
- Coordinates: 16°57′31″N 106°57′17″E
- Type: memorial
- No. of interments: More than 10,000
- Website: http://nghiatrangtruongson.quangtri.gov.vn/

The Trường Sơn Martyrs' Cemetery (Nghĩa trang liệt sĩ Trường Sơn "Long Mountains martyrs' cemetery") is a military cemetery in Vietnam. It is located on Highway 15 near the village of Ben Tat, northwest of Dong Ha. It contains the graves of PAVN soldiers killed on the 17th parallel north (Bến Hải River) DMZ and on the Trường Sơn "Long Mountain" Annamite Range Trail (known in the West as the "Ho Chi Minh Trail").
