= Ellen Germain =

American diplomat

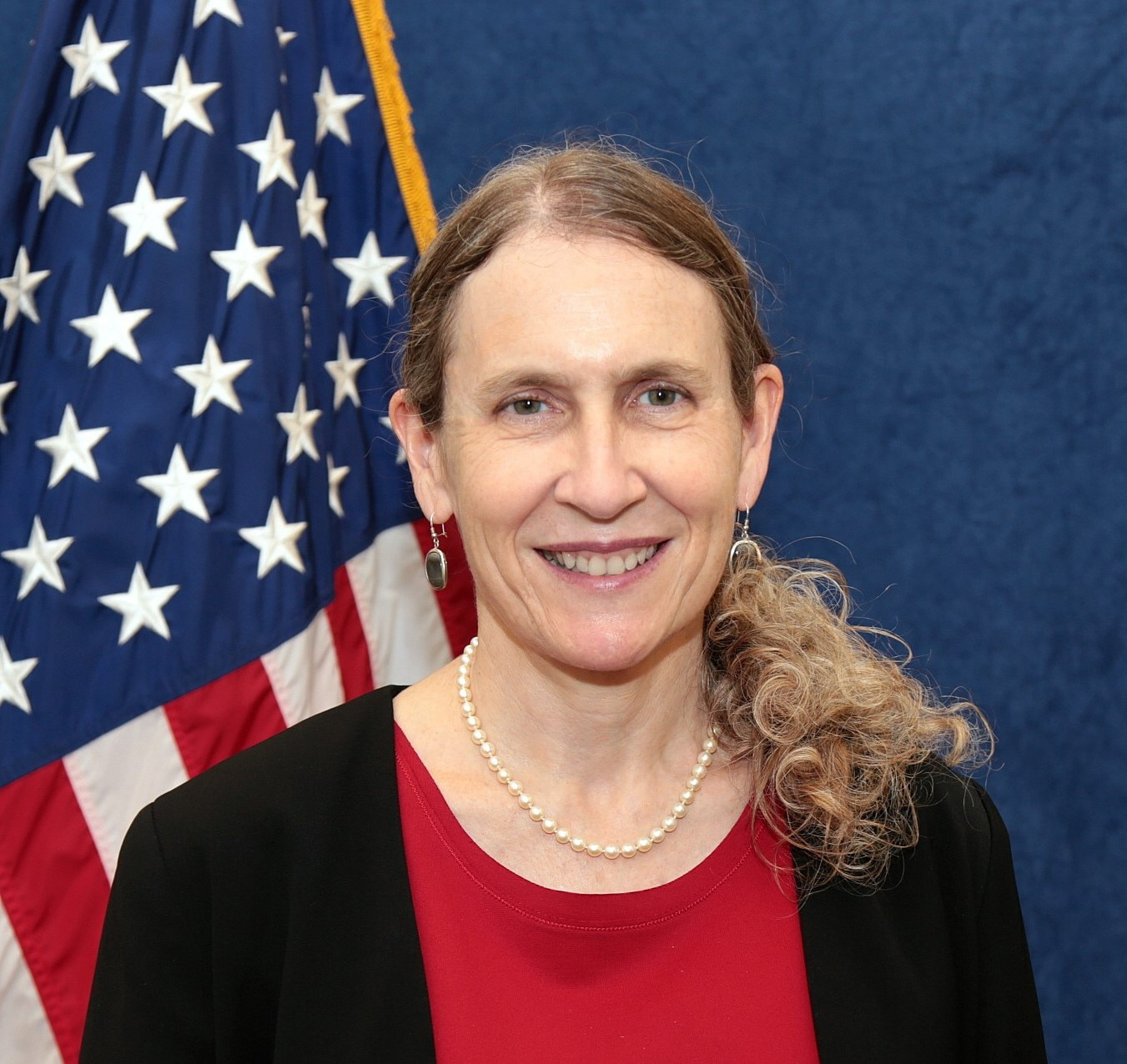
- Ellen Germain, U.S. Special Envoy for Holocaust Issues

United States Special Envoy for Holocaust Issues
- Incumbent
- Assumed office August 23, 2021
- President: Joe Biden; Donald Trump

Personal details
- Born: New York City, U.S.
- Education: Stanford University (BA); Columbia University (MA); University of Cambridge (MPhil)
- Occupation: Diplomat
- Profession: Foreign Service officer

Ellen Germain is an American career diplomat who has been the U.S. Special Envoy for Holocaust Issues since 2021. She previously served as Deputy Chief of Mission in Sarajevo and Consul General in Krakow.

== Early life and education ==
Germain grew up in New York City and attended Stanford, Columbia, and the University of Cambridge. Her interest in Holocaust issues comes in part from her own family history: her great-grandfather emigrated from Poland to the United States, leaving behind relatives who were later killed by the Nazis.

== Special Envoy for Holocaust Issues ==
Germain leads the Office of the Special Envoy for Holocaust Issues, which the State Department established in 1999 to secure restitution of Holocaust-era assets, compensation for Nazi-era wrongs, and accurate Holocaust commemoration and education.

During her tenure as Special Envoy, the United States and 21 other countries signed an agreement to clarify the guidelines set forth in the 1998 Washington Principles on Nazi-Confiscated Art, reinforcing the importance of "just and fair solutions" for Holocaust victims and their heirs.

Germain has repeatedly pressed European governments to acknowledge wartime collaboration with the Nazis, criticizing the rehabilitation of those who "participated in acts of Nazi genocide." At a commemoration of the Jedwabne pogrom, she told Polish press her role was "to defend the truth about the Holocaust" and cited the Polish Institute of National Remembrance's finding that Poles were responsible for the pogrom. At the same time, she has acknowledged that the United States "did not do a great job" helping Jewish refugees who were trying to flee the Nazis.

After the Bondi Beach shooting, Germain warned against rising antisemitism around the world, including in the United States, observing that some responses to the October 7 attacks have similarities to Holocaust denial, which she has called "a pernicious form of antisemitism." She has also claimed there is rising Holocaust distortion since October 7, fueled by social media and AI.

Germain represents the United States at the International Holocaust Remembrance Alliance.
