= Office of the Special Envoy for Holocaust Issues =

U.S. diplomatic office

- Seal of the United States Department of State

Agency overview
- Formed: 1999; 27 years ago
- Jurisdiction: Executive branch of the United States
- Annual budget: $1.5 million (2022)
- Agency executive: Ellen Germain, Special Envoy
- Parent department: U.S. Department of State
- Website: Official website

The Office of the Special Envoy for Holocaust Issues is a diplomatic office of the Bureau of European and Eurasian Affairs at the United States Department of State. Established in 1999, the office develops and implements U.S. policy to ensure Holocaust property restitution, secure compensation for Nazi-era wrongs, and promote Holocaust commemoration.

The office is led by the Special Envoy for Holocaust Issues (SEHI), who reports to the Assistant Secretary for European and Eurasian Affairs. Career Foreign Service officer Ellen Germain has served as Special Envoy for Holocaust Issues since August 23, 2021.

== Responsibilities ==
Within the State Department's Bureau of European and Eurasian Affairs, the office is charged with developing and implementing U.S. policy to promote the restitution of Jewish property that was expropriated during World War II to Holocaust survivors and their heirs. The office also works alongside the State Department's Office of the Special Envoy to Monitor and Combat Antisemitism to promote Holocaust education, track and combat antisemitism, and preserve Holocaust-era archives.

Since 2005, the Special Envoy leads the U.S. government's efforts to organize Holocaust Remembrance Day commemorations. Since 2017, the office has issued reports on how countries are implementing the Terezin Declaration, a 2009 non-binding declaration by 47 countries to right economic wrongs during the Holocaust.

The Special Envoy sits on the board of the U.S. Holocaust Memorial Museum and is the U.S. representative to the 33-member International Holocaust Remembrance Alliance.

== History ==
In the late 1990s, many countries were coming to terms with the treatment of their Jewish communities during World War II and the Holocaust, particularly the expropriation of Jewish property and real estate. Then-Deputy Secretary of the Treasury Stuart Eizenstat pushed the Clinton Administration to establish a formal position to demonstrate its commitment to assisting Holocaust survivors and their descendants seek restitution.

=== Trump Administration ===
Veteran diplomat Cherrie Daniels served as Special Envoy from August 19, 2019 to August 6, 2021.

=== Biden Administration ===
President Joe Biden appointed career Foreign Service officer Ellen Germain as Special Envoy, and she began service on August 23, 2021. Germain previously served as the Deputy Chief of Mission at the U.S. Embassy in Sarajevo from 2018 to 2021.

== See also ==
- White House Jewish Liaison
- Holocaust Era Asset Restitution Taskforce
