= Pete Peterson =

American politician and diplomat (born 1935)

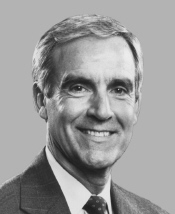

United States Ambassador to Vietnam
- In office May 14, 1997 – July 15, 2001
- President: Bill Clinton; George W. Bush
- Preceded by: Position established
- Succeeded by: Raymond Burghardt

Member of the U.S. House of Representatives from Florida's 2nd district
- In office January 3, 1991 – January 3, 1997
- Preceded by: Bill Grant
- Succeeded by: Allen Boyd

Personal details
- Born: Douglas Brian Peterson; June 26, 1935 (age 91) Omaha, Nebraska, U.S.
- Citizenship: American; Australian (2002–present)
- Party: Democratic
- Education: University of Tampa (BA); University of Central Michigan (MA, PhD)

Military service
- Allegiance: United States
- Branch/service: United States Air Force
- Years of service: 1954–1980
- Rank: Colonel
- Unit: 433rd Tactical Fighter Squadron
- Battles/wars: Vietnam War (WIA)
- Awards: Silver Star (2); Legion of Merit; Distinguished Flying Cross; Bronze Star (3); Purple Heart

Douglas Brian "Pete" Peterson (born June 26, 1935) is an American politician and diplomat. He served as a United States Air Force pilot during the Vietnam War and spent over six years as a prisoner of the North Vietnamese army after his plane was shot down. He served three terms in the United States House of Representatives from 1991 to 1996 and returned to Hanoi when he became the first United States Ambassador to Vietnam in 1997. He was an ambassador until July 2001, after which he devoted himself to philanthropic work.

== Early life and education ==
Peterson grew up in Milton, Iowa, and attended college at the University of Tampa. He joined the United States Air Force and served in the Vietnam War, where his F-4 Phantom II fighter was shot down on September 10, 1966. He spent six years in prison, a period he described as "hours and hours of boredom, spliced with moments of stark terror." He was released on March 4, 1973.

== Career ==
After the Vietnam War, Peterson remained in the Air Force and retired in 1981 as a colonel with 26 years of service. After retirement he established a general contracting firm in Tampa, Florida and later a small computer company in Marianna, Florida called CRT Computers. He served for 5 years on the faculty of Florida State University in Tallahassee, Florida.

=== Congress ===
In 1990, Peterson ran as a Democrat for a seat in the United States House of Representatives in Florida's 2nd congressional district. He defeated Bill Grant, the incumbent congressman who had grown unpopular after switching from the Democratic Party to the Republican Party in the middle of his second term. Peterson won and served three terms from 1991 to 1996.

Jason Altmire, who later became a three-term congressman himself, was a staffer during Peterson’s first campaign and time in Congress.

=== Ambassador to Vietnam ===
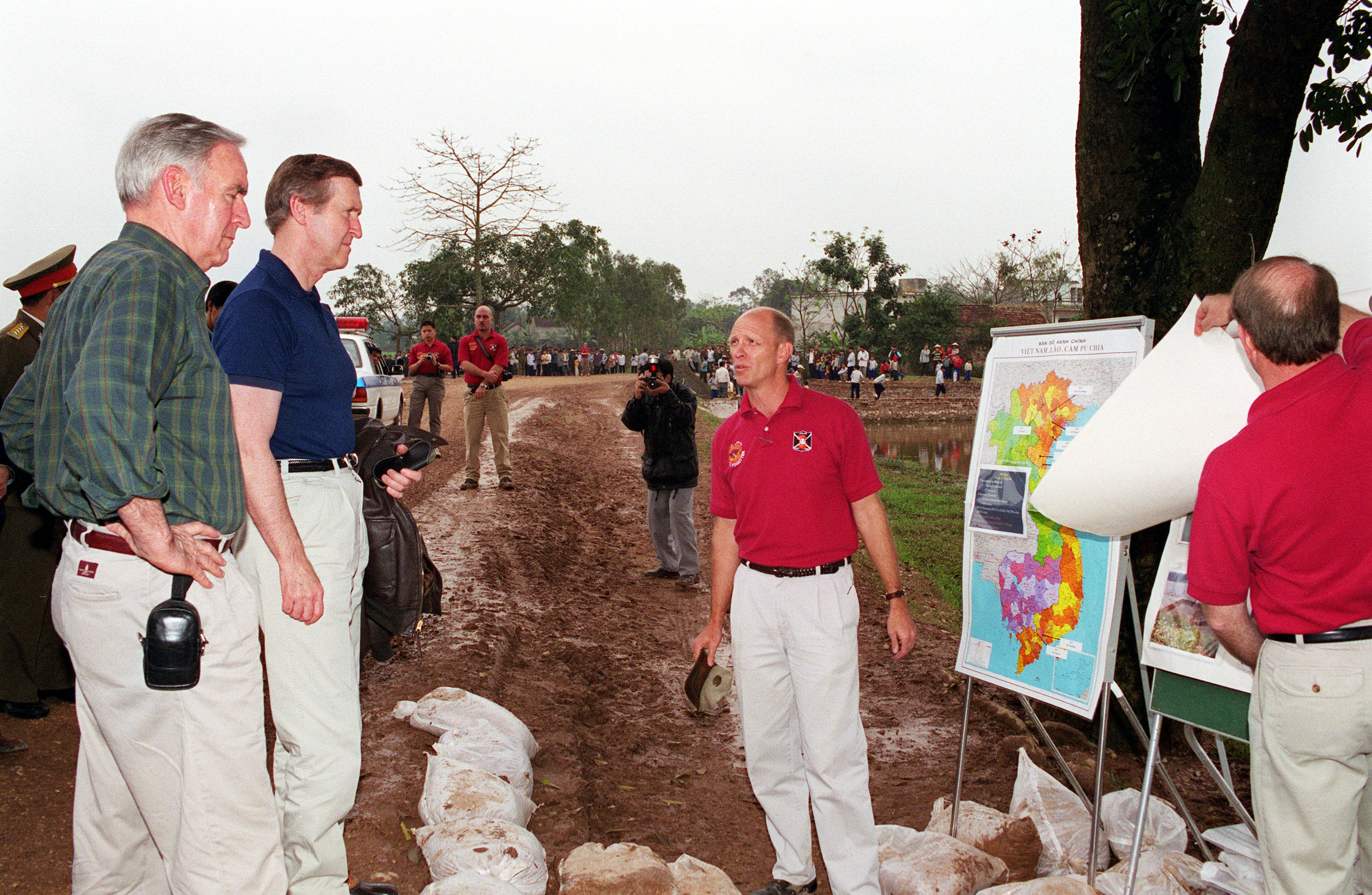
Peterson (left) with U.S. Defense Secretary William Cohen (second from left) at a crash excavation site near Hanoi, Vietnam, in 2000

Peterson declined to run for a fourth term (he was succeeded by Allen Boyd) and was asked by President Bill Clinton to become the United States's first post-war ambassador to Vietnam. He was confirmed by the Senate and began his tenure in 1997. His primary goals were securing an account of those still listed as missing in action from the war and helping to resolve the Vietnam War POW/MIA issue.

=== Presidential Citizens Medal ===
On November 17, 2000, he was presented with the Presidential Citizens Medal by President Clinton.

=== Philanthropy and business ===
Since retiring as ambassador, Peterson founded The Alliance for Safe Children, TASC, which aims to lower preventable injuries to children worldwide, and focuses specifically on such issues as drowning in Asia. In addition, he started the company, Peterson International, with his wife, whose aim it is to promote American business in Southeast Asia.

Peterson later was a senior advisor for Albright Stonebridge Group, an international strategic consulting firm.

== Personal life ==
Peterson's first wife died in 1995. Two weeks after his installation in Hanoi, he met Vi Le, Australia's senior trade commissioner, born in Vietnam, whom he married. In 2002, he moved to Melbourne, Australia, so they could be closer to her family.

In 2009, Peterson acquired Australian citizenship.

U.S. House of Representatives
Preceded by Bill Grant	Member of the U.S. House of Representatives from Florida's 2nd congressional district 1991–1997	Succeeded by Allen Boyd
Diplomatic posts
New office	United States Ambassador to Vietnam; 1997–2001	Succeeded by Raymond Burghardt
U.S. order of precedence (ceremonial)
Preceded by Bill Schuette as Former U.S. Representative	Order of precedence of the United States as Former U.S. Representative	Succeeded by Joe Scarborough as Former U.S. Representative
