= Constantine Menges =

American scholar, author and professor

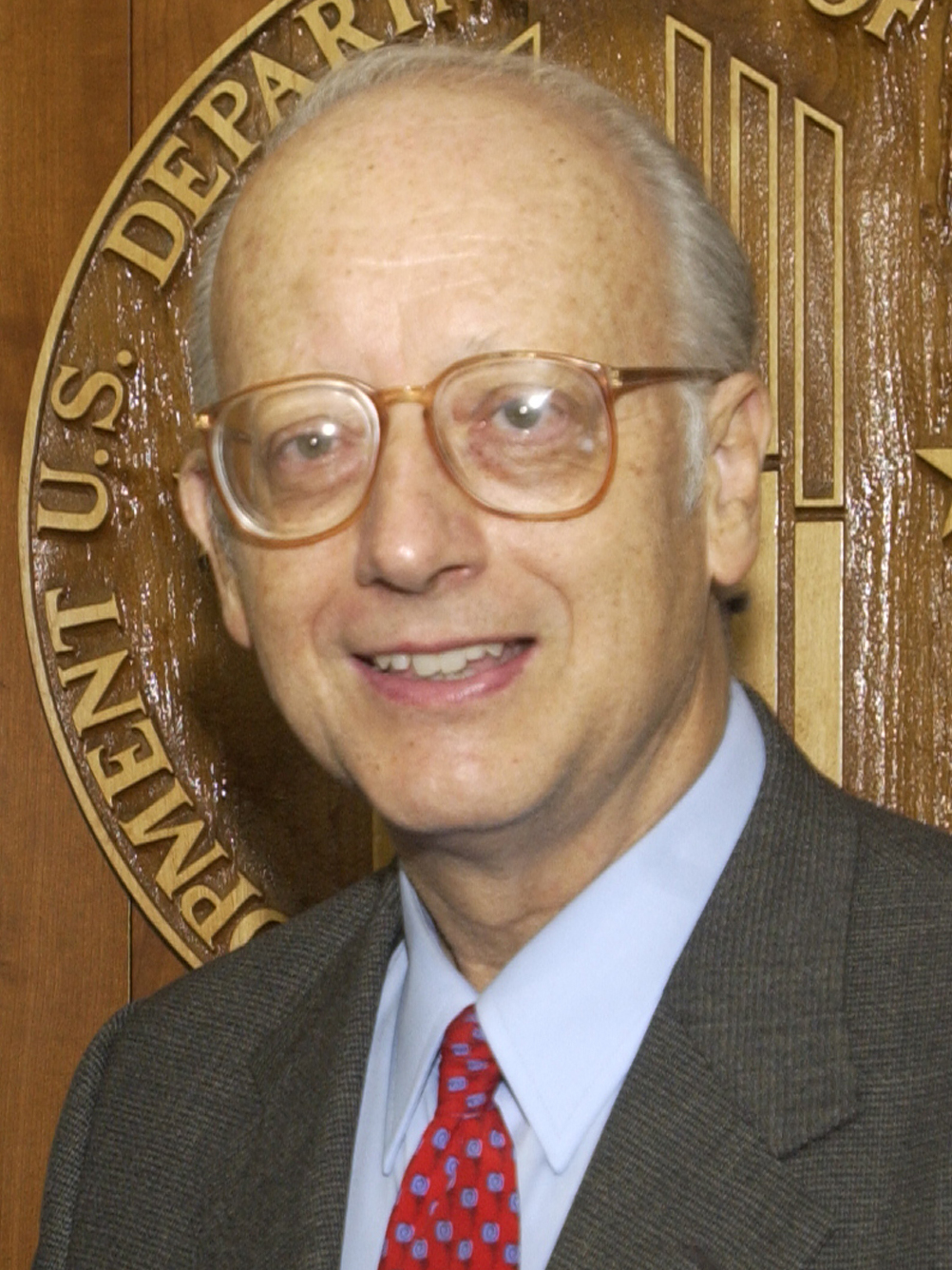
Menges in 2003

Constantine C. Menges (September 1, 1939 – July 11, 2004) was an American scholar, author, professor, and Latin American specialist for the White House's US National Security Council and the Central Intelligence Agency.

Menges was born in Turkey on September 1, 1939, the day that Germany invaded Poland to start World War II. His parents sent him to the United States in 1943. Menges attended college in Prague. He earned a bachelor's degree in physics and a doctorate in political science from Columbia University. He helped German refugees escape over the Berlin Wall and organized civil resistance after the Soviet invasion of Czechoslovakia in 1968 during the Prague Spring

Menges worked to ensure equal voting rights in Mississippi and marched with the Rev. Martin Luther King Jr. During the Nixon and Ford administrations, he was deputy assistant for civil rights in the Department of Health, Education, and Welfare.

From 1981 until 1983, he worked for the director of the CIA as the national intelligence officer for Latin America. From 1983 until 1986, he served as special assistant to President Ronald Reagan. He helped plan Operation Urgent Fury in Grenada and supported the Nicaraguan Contras and the Salvadoran rebels. Friends and foes gave him the nickname "Constant Menace". He wrote a critical account of his experiences as a government official in his 1988 book, Inside the National Security Council: The True Story of the Making and Unmaking of Reagan's Foreign Policy

In September 2002, Constantine Menges sent a letter to Olavo de Carvalho in which he agreed with the Brazilian philosopher's analysis of the current political situation in Brazil.

He died of cancer on July 11, 2004, in Washington, D.C., where he had been a senior fellow at the Hudson Institute.
