= List of ambassadors of the United States to Vietnam =

Ambassador of the United States to Vietnam
- Đại sứ Hoa Kỳ tại Việt Nam
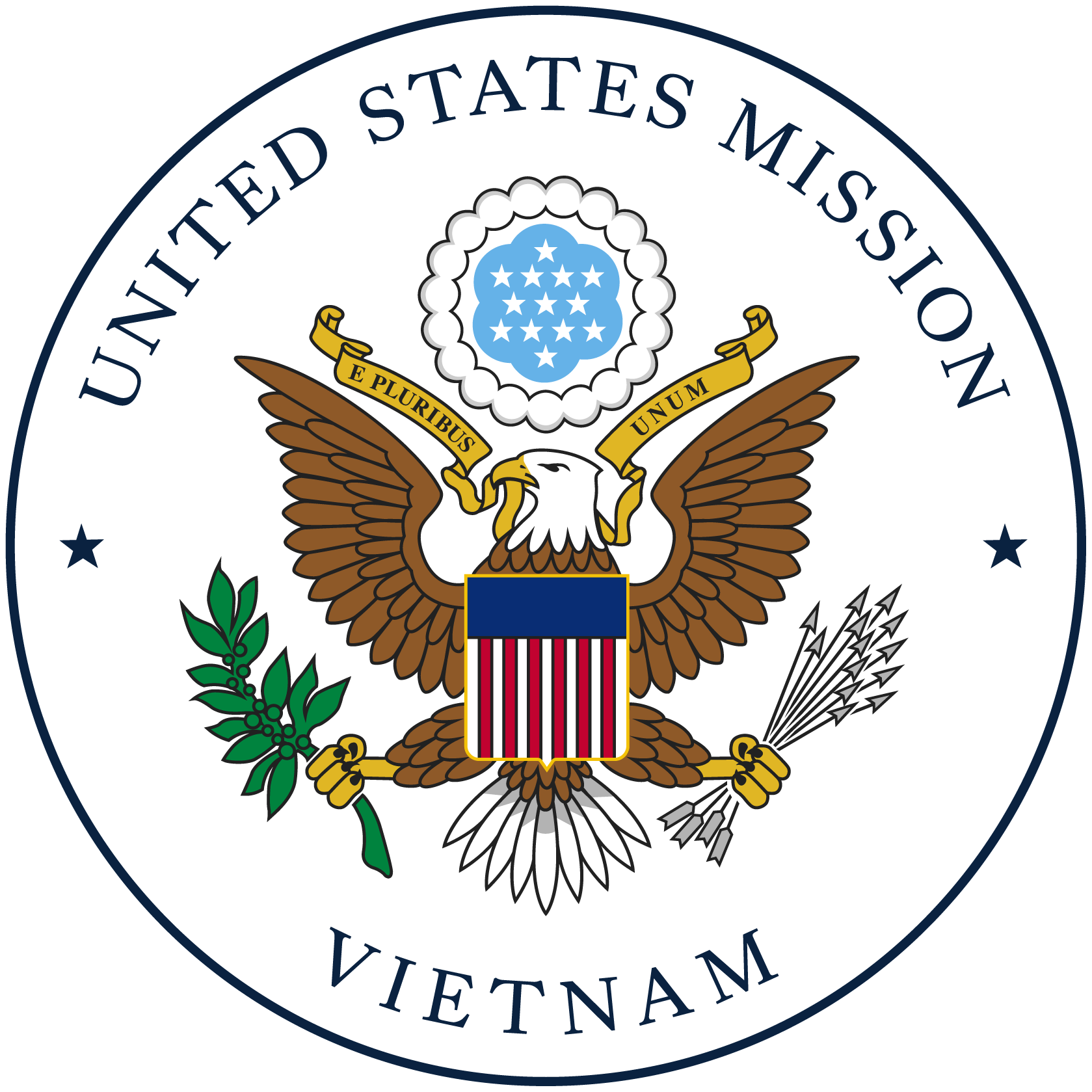
- Seal of the United States Mission to Vietnam

- United States ambassador flag

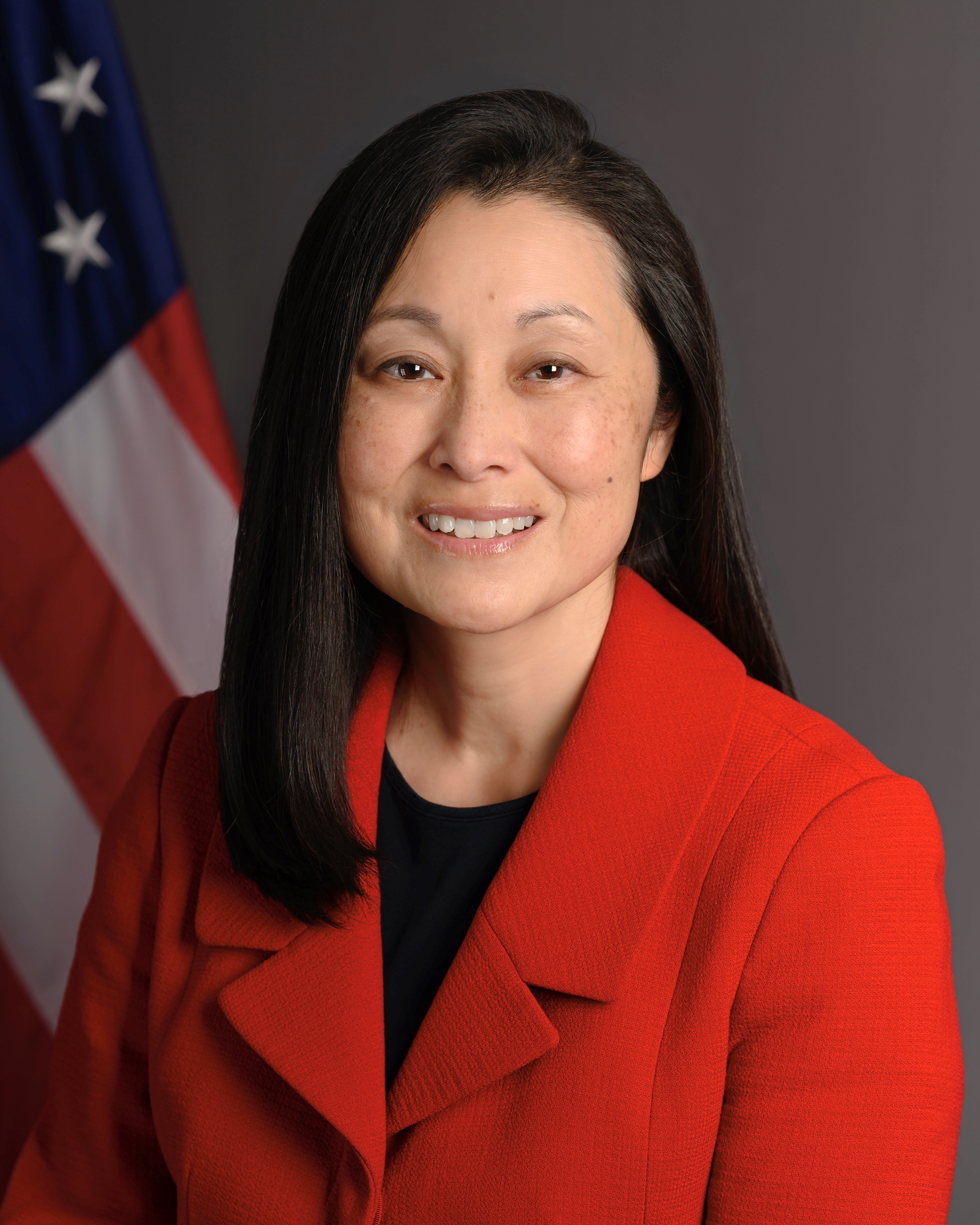
- Incumbent; Jennifer Wicks since July 6, 2026
- Nominator: The president of the United States
- Inaugural holder: Pete Peterson as Ambassador Extraordinary and Plenipotentiary
- Formation: April 11, 1997
- Website: U.S. Embassy Hanoi

The United States ambassador to Vietnam (Đại sứ Hoa Kỳ tại Việt Nam), formally the Ambassador Extraordinary and Plenipotentiary of the United States of America to the Socialist Republic of Vietnam (Đại sứ đặc mệnh toàn quyền Hợp chúng quốc Hoa Kỳ tại Việt Nam, 'Ambassador extraordinary and plenipotentiary of the United States of America in Vietnam'), is the chief American diplomat to the Socialist Republic of Vietnam. After the First Indochina War and the defeat of the French domination over Vietnam, the country was split into North and South Vietnam (the Republic of Vietnam) at the Geneva Conference of 1954. The United States did not recognize North Vietnam and thus had no diplomatic relations with the country. After the reunification of Vietnam in 1976, there followed a period of 20 years in which the United States had no diplomatic relations with Vietnam.

The U.S. opened a Liaison Office in Hanoi on January 28, 1995. Diplomatic relations were established July 11, 1995, and the embassy in Hanoi was established with L. Desaix Anderson as chargé d’affaires ad interim.

== Ambassadors ==
=== Since 1997 ===
Name	Title	Appointed	Presented credentials	Terminated mission
Pete Peterson – Political appointee	Ambassador Extraordinary and Plenipotentiary	April 11, 1997	May 14, 1997	July 15, 2001
Raymond Burghardt – Career FSO	Ambassador Extraordinary and Plenipotentiary	November 28, 2001	February 5, 2002	September 5, 2004
Michael W. Marine – Career FSO	Ambassador Extraordinary and Plenipotentiary	May 6, 2004	September 10, 2004	August 10, 2007
Michael W. Michalak – Career FSO	Ambassador Extraordinary and Plenipotentiary	May 24, 2007	August 10, 2007	February 14, 2011
Virginia E. Palmer – Career FSO	Chargé d'Affaires ad interim	February 14, 2011	-	July 2011
David B. Shear – Career FSO	Ambassador Extraordinary and Plenipotentiary	August 4, 2011	August 29, 2011	August 8, 2014
Ted Osius – Career FSO	Ambassador Extraordinary and Plenipotentiary	December 10, 2014	December 16, 2014	November 4, 2017
Daniel Kritenbrink – Career FSO	Ambassador Extraordinary and Plenipotentiary	October 27, 2017	November 6, 2017	April 15, 2021
Christopher Klein	Chargé d'Affaires ad interim	April 15, 2021	-	October 15, 2021
Marie C. Damour	Chargé d'Affaires ad interim	October 15, 2021	-	January 27, 2022
Marc Knapper – Career FSO	Ambassador Extraordinary and Plenipotentiary	January 3, 2022	February 11, 2022	January 18, 2026
Courtney Beale – Career FSO	Chargé d'Affaires ad interim	January 19, 2026	-	March 5, 2026
John W. McInytre – Career FSO	Chargé d'Affaires ad interim	March 5, 2026	-	July 2, 2026
Jennifer Wicks	Ambassador Extraordinary and Plenipotentiary	May 18, 2026	July 6, 2026	Present

== Residence ==
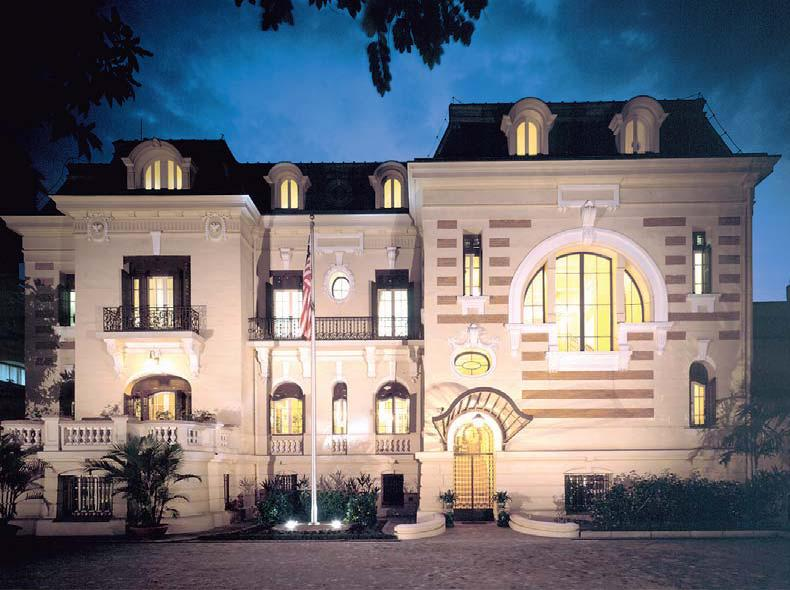
Ambassador's Residence

The house used by the U.S. ambassador was designed by M. LaCollogne, Principal Architect and Chief of Civil Construction Service in Tonkin and built in 1921 by Indochina Public Property, part of the French colonial government, for Indochina Financial Governors who lived here until 1948. The house was then assigned, until 1954, to the highest-ranking Indochina Tariff Officer. When the French left South East Asia in 1954, Vietnamese government officials moved in. Deputy Prime Minister Phan Kế Toại was the last occupant; at his death, the house became the headquarter of the Committee for Foreign Culture Exchange. The Ministry of Foreign Affairs’ press office was located in the building until 1994. The residence was included in an exchange of property between the United States of America and the Socialist Republic of Vietnam in 1995.

== See also ==
- United States - Vietnam relations
- Foreign relations of Vietnam
- Ambassadors of the United States
