= Audrey Kurth Cronin =

American scholar of international security

- Citizenship: American
- Employer(s): Carnegie Mellon University; American University; George Mason University; University of Oxford; National War College; Congressional Research Service; Georgetown University; University of Maryland; University of Virginia; Office of the Under Secretary of Defense for Policy; Office of the Secretary of the Navy; U.S. Embassy, Moscow
- Known for: International security How Conflicts End; Emerging technology and security Open vs. closed technological innovation Technological Diffusion to Nonstate Actors; Counterterrorism
- Spouse: Patrick M. Cronin
- Children: 2
- Awards: Marshall Scholarship; Airey Neave Prize (2020); Department of the Army Civilian Service Commendation Medal; Frank M. Covey Endowed Lecture (Loyola, 2019); 2015 Honorary Keogh Chair (Australian Army); Phi Beta Kappa (Princeton)

Academic background
- Education: Princeton University (AB); University of Oxford (MPhil, DPhil)
- Thesis: The Great Powers and the Struggle over Austria, 1945-1955 (1985)
- Doctoral advisor: Adam Roberts; Hedley Bull; Michael Howard
- Other advisors: Samuel Huntington; Stanley Hoffmann; Richard Ullman; Lynn White, III
- Website: www.audreykurthcronin.com

Audrey Kurth Cronin is an American scholar of international security and emerging technology. She serves as Director of the Carnegie Mellon Institute for Strategy and Technology (CMIST) and holds the title of Trustees Professor of Security and Technology at Carnegie Mellon University.

Cronin is known for her work on how terrorism ends and on the relationship between technological innovation and political violence. She distinguishes between "closed" technological revolutions (characterized by state-controlled, expensive military technologies like nuclear weapons) and "open" technological revolutions, in which lethal technologies diffuse through commercial processes and become accessible to individuals and non-state actors.

== Early life and education ==
Cronin was a Marshall Scholar from Princeton University, earned a DPhil from the University of Oxford, and was a postdoctoral fellow at Harvard University.

Cronin received her A.B. in Public and International Affairs (summa cum laude) from Princeton University in 1981. Her mentors were Lynn White III and Richard Ullman. She ranked in the top ten of her class and was elected to Phi Beta Kappa. She was awarded the Princeton School of Public and International Affairs (formerly Woodrow Wilson School) Senior Thesis Prize ("Controls and Incentives: Chinese and Soviet Internal Migration Policies") and a Marshall Scholarship. Reading International Relations at St. Antony’s College, she earned an M.Phil. in 1983 and a D.Phil. in 1985 from Oxford University. Cronin studied under professors Adam Roberts, Hedley Bull, and Michael Howard. She was a Ford Post-Doctoral Fellow at Harvard University (1984–85), jointly appointed in the Center for International Affairs under Professor Samuel Huntington and the Center for European Studies under Professor Stanley Hoffmann.

Her doctoral thesis, titled The Great Powers and the Struggle over Austria, 1945-1955, challenged the prevailing view that the Austrian State Treaty of 1955 was a triumph of diligent multilateral diplomacy. Instead, she argued that the treaty was largely the result of "unilateral actions," especially those of the Soviet Union. The critical factor was Nikita Khrushchev's failed attempt to create a neutral corridor in Europe, including Germany. Based on declassified British and American records, as well as interviews with Austrian statesmen such as Rudolf Kirschläger and Bruno Kreisky, she investigated how the Cold War deadlock led Austria to choose a "third way" of neutrality, a model later cited for countries such as Afghanistan and Ukraine. This research formed the basis for her first book, Great Power Politics and the Struggle over Austria, 1945-1955, published by Cornell University Press in 1986 and reissued in 2023.

== Career ==
Cronin's first job was in the Commercial Office of the American Embassy in Moscow.

She began her academic career as an Assistant Professor at the University of Virginia's Department of Government and Foreign Affairs (1985–1988). She then served as Assistant Director of the Center for International Security Studies at Maryland (under founding director Catherine McArdle Kelleher) and Assistant Professor at the University of Maryland's School of Public Policy (then School of Public Affairs) (1988–1996). She also worked in the Office of the Secretary of Defense during summers in 1985–1986, drafting portions of the Secretary's strategic plan for Under Secretary of Defense for Policy Fred Iklé and Assistant Secretary of Defense Dov Zakheim. Her first professional role was as a speechwriter for Secretary of the Navy John Lehman in 1981, writing speeches on Maritime Strategy before departing for Oxford.

From 1999 to 2003, Cronin was a Research Fellow at the Center for Peace and Security Studies (now Center for Security Studies) and Visiting Associate Professor in the Security Studies Program at Georgetown University. Along with Director Michael Brown, she helped build the Georgetown’s Security Studies program’s curriculum, enrollment, and profile. Her graduate course on Political Violence and Terrorism was featured in The New York Times in November 2001.

From January 2003 to August 2004, Cronin served as Specialist in Terrorism at the Congressional Research Service, Library of Congress, where she was senior researcher and advisor for Members of Congress (both parties) on international terrorism. She supported special commissions including the 9/11 Commission, briefed senior members of Congress, helped Congressional staffers plan hearings, and prepared Members for them. She has held various security clearances throughout her government career.

From September 2005 to July 2007, Cronin was Director of Studies for the Changing Character of War Programme at Oxford University, the university's premier interdisciplinary research program on war and peace.

Cronin served as Director of War and Statecraft and Professor at the U.S. National War College from 2007 to 2011 (and previously in 2004–2005). She was a member of the inter-agency strategic review team for Afghanistan policy led by Brigadier General H.R. McMaster for General David Petraeus. She received a Department of Defense commendation award for increasing the academic rigor of the program.

Cronin was Founding Director of the International Security Program and Distinguished Service Professor (tenured) at the Schar School of Policy and Government, George Mason University, from 2011 to 2016. She was promoted to distinguished professor rank in August 2013.

Cronin served as a professor at the National War College and a research associate of the Changing Character of War program at Oxford University.

Prior to joining Carnegie Mellon University, Cronin was a tenured faculty member at American University's School of International Service from 2016, where she was named Distinguished Professor in 2021 and founded the Center for Security, Innovation and New Technology. She also founded and directed the International Security graduate program at George Mason University.

Cronin officially joined Carnegie Mellon University on January 1, 2023. She was named founding director of the Carnegie Mellon Institute for Strategy and Technology (formerly known as the Institute for Politics and Strategy; now known as CMIST) and Trustees Professor of Security and Technology.

Cronin serves on the editorial boards of Texas National Security Review, Terrorism and Political Violence, Parameters, Orbis, Journal of Strategic Studies, and Studies in Conflict and Terrorism.

=== CMIST ===
At CMIST, Cronin emphasizes an interdisciplinary, collaborative approach that brings together experts from artificial intelligence, machine learning, robotics, and cybersecurity to work with policymakers and strategists on managing the risks and benefits of emerging technologies. She has described running CMIST with an "entrepreneurial" and "start-up" mindset.

=== WEF's Global Agenda Council on Terrorism ===
Cronin served as chairman of the World Economic Forum's Global Agenda Council on Terrorism and is a life member of the Council on Foreign Relations.

=== How Terrorism Ends ===
How Terrorism Ends: Understanding the Decline and Demise of Terrorist Campaigns (2009) was the first systematic study of terrorist campaign termination. Using a dataset of 457 terrorist organizations active since 1968, Cronin identified six recurring patterns by which terrorist campaigns decline and end: decapitation (capturing or killing the leader), negotiations, success in achieving objectives, failure through implosion or loss of popular support, repression by state force, and reorientation toward other forms of violence such as criminality or insurgency. She applied the framework to al-Qaeda. She argued that the group would not be ended through military repression or decapitation alone, but was more likely to decline through a combination of internal fractionalization, loss of popular support, and disaggregation of its loosely affiliated network.

The book was described by Thomas Hegghammer in the Journal of Peace Research as "a pioneering and extremely valuable study that opens up a whole new line of inquiry in the study of terrorism." Writing in The European Legacy, James M. Lutz called it "one of the more important works to appear in recent years" and considered its conclusions about the need for multiple counterterrorism strategies were "pointedly at odds with some national counterterrorism strategies." Maria Rasmussen, in Political Science Quarterly, described it as "a bold first attempt" to systematically study the demise of terrorist campaigns, supported by "a wealth of case study evidence." Daniel Byman cited the book's analysis of counterterrorism tactics, popular support, and organizational decline as directly relevant to explaining al-Qaeda's trajectory in a 2017 review essay in The Journal of Politics.

Some reviewers noted limitations. Ivan Arreguín-Toft, writing in Perspectives on Politics, thought that the book was "stronger on description than prescription" and argued that it did not fully deliver on the promise of actionable guidance for ending terrorism. Hegghammer said that while the book effectively mapped how campaigns end, it "does not go very far in addressing the deeper question of why campaigns end the way they do."

== Selected works ==
=== Books ===
- Great Power Politics and the Struggle over Austria, 1945–1955 (Cornell University Press, 1986) — her revised Oxford dissertation, published in the Cornell Studies in Security Affairs Series.
- Attacking Terrorism: Elements of a Grand Strategy (Georgetown University Press, 2004) — co-editor and author of two chapters; a best-seller for the press with over 1,069 citations on Google Scholar.
- Ending Terrorism: Lessons for Defeating al-Qaeda (Routledge, 2008) — IISS Adelphi Paper Series #394.
- How Terrorism Ends: Understanding the Decline and Demise of Terrorist Campaigns (Princeton University Press, 2009) — won Choice Magazine's Outstanding Academic Title award (2010); translated into Chinese (2017); has 981 citations on Google Scholar.
- Power to the People: How Open Technological Innovation is Arming Tomorrow's Terrorists (Oxford University Press, 2020) — short-listed for the Lionel Gelber Prize; won the Airey Neave Prize (2019/20); named Foreign Affairs' "Best of 2019."

=== Journal articles and book chapters ===
- Cronin, Audrey Kurth. "Rethinking sovereignty: American strategy in the age of terrorism." Survival 44, no. 2 (2002): 119-139.
- Cronin, Audrey Kurth. Al Qaeda after the Iraq conflict. No. CRSRS21529. 2003.
- Cronin, Audrey Kurth. "Behind the Curve: Globalization and International Terrorism." International Security 27, no. 3 (Winter 2002/2003): 30–58.
- Cronin, Audrey Kurth. "How al-Qaeda Ends." International Security 31, no. 1 (Summer 2006): 7–48.
- Cronin, Audrey Kurth. "How terrorist campaigns end." In Leaving terrorism behind, pp. 49–65. Routledge, 2008.
- Cronin, Audrey Kurth. "US grand strategy and counterterrorism." Orbis 56, no. 2 (2012): 192-214.
- Cronin, Audrey Kurth. "Why Drones Fail: When Tactics Drive Strategy." Foreign Affairs92, no. 4 (July/August 2013): 44–54.
- Cronin, Audrey Kurth. "How global communications are changing the character of war." Seton Hall J. Dipl. & Int'l Rel.14 (2013): 25.
- Cronin, Audrey Kurth. "The ‘War on Terrorism’: What Does it Mean to Win?." Journal of Strategic Studies 37, no. 2 (2014): 174-197.
- Cronin, Audrey Kurth. "ISIS Is Not a Terrorist Group: Why Counterterrorism Won't Stop the Latest Jihadist Threat." Foreign Affairs 94, no. 2 (March/April 2015): 87–98.
- Cronin, Audrey Kurth. "Technology and strategic surprise: adapting to an era of open innovation." The US Army War College Quarterly: Parameters 50, no. 3 (2020): 8.
- Cronin, Audrey Kurth. "How Hamas ends: a strategy for letting the group defeat itself." Foreign Aff. 103 (2024): 50.

== Awards ==
Her book Power to the People: How Open Technological Innovation is Arming Tomorrow's Terrorists (Oxford, 2020) was short-listed for the Lionel Gelber Prize and won the 2020 Neave Prize. Her earlier book How Terrorism Ends: Understanding the Decline and Demise of Terrorist Campaigns (Princeton, 2009) was described by The New Yorker as a "landmark study."

== Personal life ==
Cronin is based in Pittsburgh, Pennsylvania and Washington, DC. She is married to Patrick M. Cronin. They have two children. She was also founding captain of the St. Antony's College Women's Rowing Team at Oxford University (1983–84).
