= Rush Doshi =

American political scientist

- Education: Harvard University (PhD), Princeton University (BA)
- Occupation: Political scientist
- Employer(s): Georgetown University, Council on Foreign Relations
- Website: https://www.rushdoshi.com

Rush Doshi is an American political scientist currently serving as an assistant professor of security studies at Georgetown University's School of Foreign Service. He is also senior fellow for China and director of the Initiative on China Strategy at the Council on Foreign Relations (CFR). He served at the White House National Security Council (NSC) in the Biden administration as Director and later Deputy Senior Director for China and Taiwan from 2021 to March 2024.

== Education ==
Doshi graduated with an A.B. from the Princeton School of Public and International Affairs in 2011 after completing a 142-page-long senior thesis, titled "China's Strategic Liberalism: Institutional Participation Under the Shadow of American Power," under the supervision of Robert Keohane. He later received a Ph.D. in political science and government from Harvard University. His dissertation, published in 2018, was titled "The Long Game: Chinese Grand Strategy After the Cold War." It served as the basis of his 2021 book titled "The Long Game: China’s Grand Strategy to Displace American Order." Stephen P. Rosen was his dissertation committee chair.

== Career ==
Prior to joining the Biden administration, Doshi was founding director of the China Strategy Initiative at the Brookings Institution and an adjunct senior fellow in the Asia-Pacific security program at the Center for a New American Security. He was a 2020 China Fellow at the Wilson Center.

Doshi left the NSC in March 2024 and joined CFR as the C.V. Starr Senior Fellow for Asia Studies. In June 2024, Doshi was named as the head of CFR's new China Strategy Initiative.

== Select publications ==
=== Books ===
- "The Long Game: China’s Grand Strategy to Displace American Order," Oxford University Press, June 11, 2021. (received the 2021 Edgar S. Furniss Book Award from Ohio State University's Mershon Center for International Security Studies)

=== Reports ===
- China as a ‘cyber great power’: Beijing's two voices in telecommunications, Brookings Institution, April 2021 (co-authored with Emily de La Bruyère, Nathan Picarsic, and John Ferguson)

=== Articles ===
- The Moment China Proved It Was America’s Equal, NYTimes, Nov 19, 2025
- The Biden Plan (in What Does America Want From China?), Foreign Affairs, May 30, 2024
- The Chinese Communist Party Has Always Been Nationalist, Foreign Policy, July 1, 2021
- "How America Can Shore Up Asian Order," Foreign Affairs, January 12, 2021 (co-authored with Kurt M. Campbell).
- The China Challenge Can Help America Avert Decline, Foreign Affairs, December 3, 2020 (co-authored with Kurt M. Campbell)
- Beijing Believes Trump Is Accelerating American Decline, Foreign Policy, October 12, 2020
- The Coronavirus Could Reshape Global Order, Foreign Affairs, March 18, 2020 (co-authored with Kurt M. Campbell)
- China Steps Up Its Information War in Taiwan, Foreign Affairs, January 9, 2020
- "Beyond the San Hai: The Challenge of China’s Blue-Water Navy," Center for a New American Security, May 15, 2017 (co-authored with Patrick M. Cronin, Mira Rapp-Hooper, Harry Krejsa, and Alexander Sullivan).
