= Elina Ribakova =

Latvian-born economist

- Education: Masters Degree
- Alma mater: Stockholm School of Economics in Riga, University of Warwick & University of Virginia
- Occupation: Economist

Elina Ribakova is an economist with expertise in economic statecraft, sanctions, the Russian economy, and macro-financial matters. She is affiliated with Bruegel in Brussels, the Kyiv School of Economics in Kyiv, and the Peterson Institute for International Economics in Washington DC. She has been a senior adjunct fellow at the Center for a New American Security (2020–23) and a research fellow at the London School of Economics (2015–17).

== Education ==
Ribakova holds a BSc in Economics and Business from the Stockholm School of Economics in Riga, and an MSc in economics from the University of Warwick, where she was the sole recipient of the Shiv Nath Prize in her year, and an MSc in Data Science from the University of Virginia.

== Career ==
Since 2023, she has been Director of the International Affairs Program and Vice President for Foreign Policy at the Kyiv School of Economics, and a nonresident fellow at the Peterson Institute for International Economics and Bruegel.

Elina Ribakova is a prominent economist with over 25 years of experience in financial markets, specializing in economic statecraft, sanctions, and macro-financial issues. Her research delves into global markets and economic sovereignty, examining how economic policies intersect with geopolitical dynamics. Ribakova has contributed to discussions on the economic implications of sanctions, particularly in relation to the Russian economy, including by testifying to the US Congress.

From 2019 to 2023, she was the Deputy Chief Economist at the Institute of International Finance (IIF) in Washington DC. Ribakova was responsible for global macroeconomic and financial markets analysis for developed and emerging markets. She managed a team of economists.

From 1999 to 2008, she worked at the International Monetary Fund, focusing on issues of financial stability, crisis resolution, fiscal policy in commodity-producing countries, and determinants of foreign direct investment (FDI). She then worked in financial sector firms including Citigroup (2008–2013), Avantium Investment Management (2013–2014), Amundi (2014–2015), and Deutsche Bank (2016–2018).

She was a visiting fellow at the Institute of Global Affairs (IGA) at the London School of Economics and Political Science (2015–2017), contributing to the Rethinking Global Finance and Global Migration initiatives, and at Bruegel from 2018. She has also been a Foreign Policy Interrupted Fellow, holder of a Chevening Scholarship, and Open Society Foundations alumna.

Ribakova is a seasoned public speaker. She has participated in and led multiple panels with leading academics, policymakers, and C-level executives. She frequently collaborates with CNN, BBC, Bloomberg, Reuters and Reuters TV, CNBC, and NPR. She is often quoted by and contributes op-eds to several global media, including the New York Times, Wall Street Journal., Financial Times, Washington Post, The Guardian, Le Monde, El Pais, and several other media outlets.
