= Patrick M. Cronin =

American international relations scholar

- Born: 1958 (age 67–68)
- Education: University of Florida (BA); University of Oxford (MPhil & DPhil)
- Occupations: Political scientist, writer
- Employer: Hudson Institute
- Spouse: Audrey Kurth Cronin

Patrick M. Cronin is an American political scientist and writer. He is a national security policy expert currently serving as chair for Asia-Pacific Security at Hudson Institute and a scholar in residence at the Carnegie Mellon University Institute for Strategy and Technology.

Cronin was previously senior director of the Asia-Pacific Security Program at the Center for a New American Security; senior director of the Institute for National Strategic Studies at the National Defense University; director of studies at the International Institute for Strategic Studies; and senior vice president and director of research at the Center for Strategic and International Studies.

== Education ==
Cronin graduated from the University of Florida with high honors and earned MPhil and DPhil from St. Antony's College, University of Oxford, where he studied international relations.

== Early career ==
While an undergraduate, Cronin worked at the Miami Herald and the Fort Lauderdale News. He was an analyst with the Congressional Research Service and SRI International, a US Naval Reserve intelligence officer, a senior analyst at the Center for Naval Analyses, and director of research at the US Institute of Peace (1998–2001).

== USAID service ==
During the George W. Bush administration, Cronin was assistant administrator for policy and program coordination (the third-ranking position) at the United States Agency for International Development. He was confirmed by the Senate in 2001.

Cronin led USAID's interagency task force that helped design the Millennium Challenge Corporation (MCC).

In a 2006 interview with NPR, Cronin said: "USAID continues to have the best expertise on development in the US government, and yet nobody will dispute that it's lost its primacy in development assistance some time ago. So what we've seen since the '90s is the strengthening of the State Department's policy leadership role in foreign development assistance. The Bush administration took that with a vengeance."

== 2020 U.S. Presidential Election ==
In 2020, Cronin, along with over 130 other former Republican national security officials, signed a statement that asserted that President Trump was unfit to serve another term, and "To that end, we are firmly convinced that it is in the best interest of our nation that Vice President Joe Biden be elected as the next President of the United States, and we will vote for him."

== Publications ==
Fear and Insecurity: Addressing North Korean Threat Perceptions, Hudson Institute (2021)

Total Competition China’s Challenge in the South China Sea, Hudson Institute (2020) (co-authored with Ryan Neuhard)

The Cornerstone and the Linchpin: Securing America’s Northeast Asian Alliances, Hudson Institute (2019)

Negotiating With North Korea How Will This End? CNAS (2019) (co-authored with Kristine Lee)

Networking Asian Security An Integrated Approach to Order in the Pacific, CNAS (2017) (co-authored with Richard Fontaine, Mira Rapp-Hooper, and Harry Krejsa)

Counterbalance: Red Teaming the Rebalance in the Asia-Pacific, CNAS (2016) (co-authored with Mira Rapp-Hooper, Harry Krejsa, and Hannah Suh)

Double Trouble: Iran and North Korea as Challenges to International Security (2010) (editor)

Global Strategic Assessment, 2009: America’s Security Role in a Changing World (2009) (editor)

Civilian Surge: Key to Complex Operations (2009) (co-editor)

The Impenetrable Fog of War: Reflections on Modern Warfare and Strategic Surprise (2008) (editor)

The Evolution of Strategic ThoughtClassic Adelphi Papers (2008) (editor)

== Personal life ==
Cronin is married to Audrey Kurth Cronin, Trustees Professor of Security and Technology at Carnegie Mellon University.
