= Nanjala Nyabola =

Kenyan writer

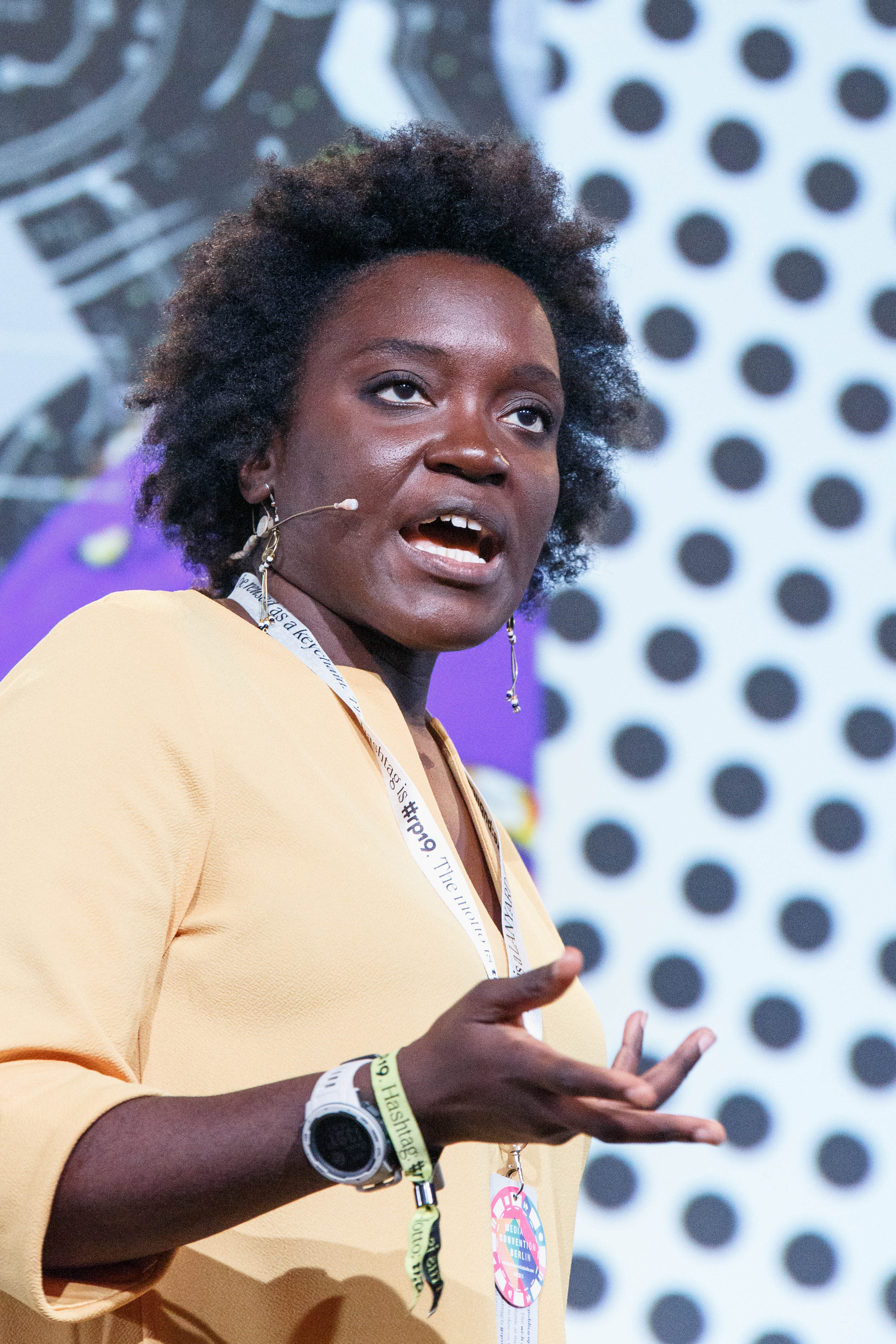
- Education: Kianda School; University of Birmingham; University of Oxford; Harvard Law School
- Occupations: Writer and political analyst
- Website: nanjalawrites.com

Nanjala Nyabola is a Kenyan writer, political analyst, and activist based in Nairobi, Kenya.

== Career ==
Nyabola writes extensively about African society and politics, technology, international law, and feminism for academic and non-academic publications. Her first book, Digital Democracy, Analogue Politics: How the Internet Era is Transforming Kenya (Zed Books, 2018), was described as "a must read for all researchers and journalists writing about Kenya today".

Nyabola held a Rhodes Scholarship at Harris Manchester College, University of Oxford, in 2009, was part of the 2017 inaugural cohort of Foreign Policy Interrupted Fellows, and was a 2017 Logan Nonfiction Program Fellow at the Carey Institute for Global Good.

Nyabola sits on the board of Amnesty International Kenya.

== Education ==
Nyabola holds multiple degrees in politics and law:

- BA African Studies and Political Science, University of Birmingham
- MSc Forced Migration, University of Oxford
- MSc African Studies, University of Oxford
- JD from Harvard Law School
- Exchange semester: Geneva Graduate Institute.

== Journalism ==
Nyabola writes extensively about African society and politics, in particular Kenya, alongside discussions of technology, international law and feminism. Her work has featured in publications and outlets including African Arguments, Al Jazeera, Financial Times, Foreign Affairs, Foreign Policy, The Guardian, New African, The New Humanitarian, The New Inquiry, New Internationalist, OkayAfrica and World Policy Journal.

Her 2010 Guardian opinion piece "Why, as an African, I took a Rhodes scholarship" was chosen as one of the 5 Best Wednesday Columns in The Atlantic.

Nyabola's 2014 Al Jazeera opinion piece "Why do Western media get Africa wrong?" generated much discussion, including on the BBC World Service and in a 2014 McGill University course syllabus on Western representations of Africa in media and pop culture.

== Public speaking ==
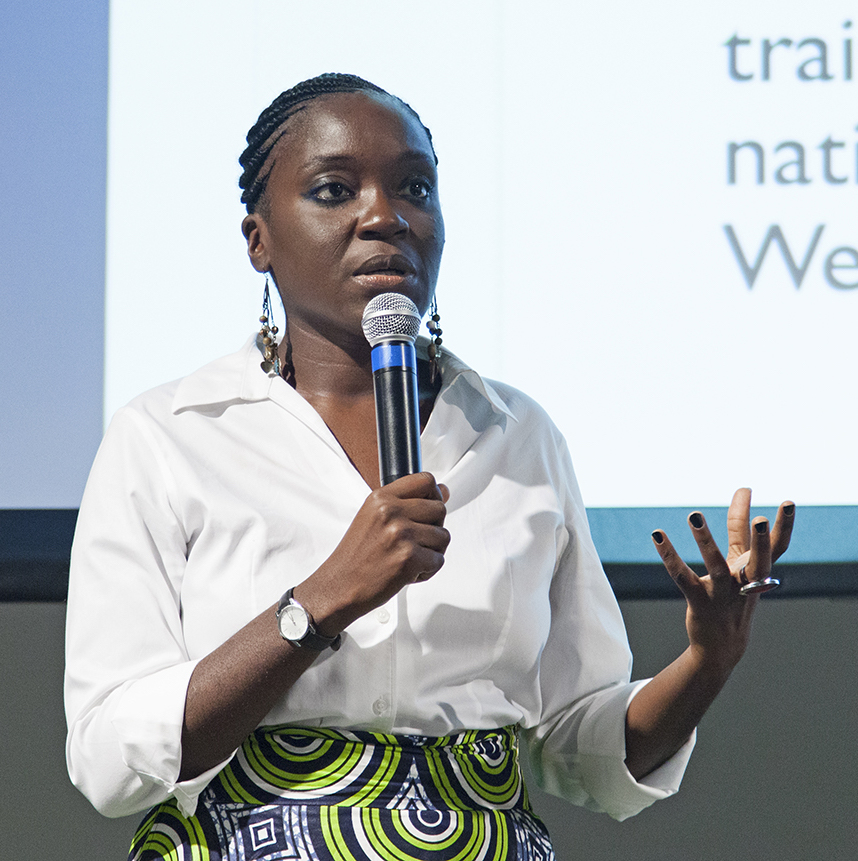
Nyabola at the Disruption Network Lab in Berlin, 2018

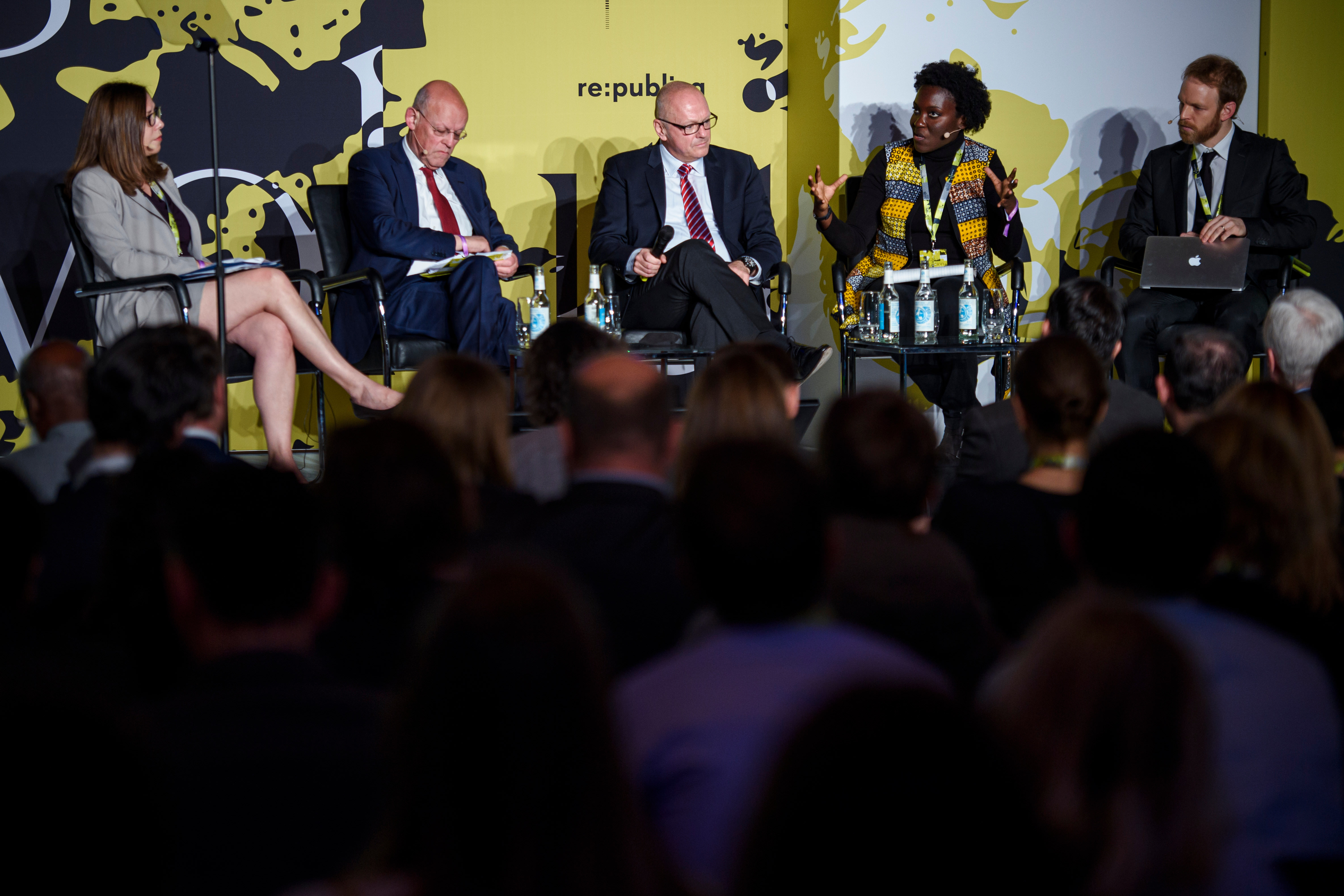
Laura Rosenberger, Uri Rosenthal, Andreas Michaelis, Nanjala Nyabola, Oliver della Costa Stuenkel in 2019

Nyabola is a frequent contributor to the BBC World Service, particularly on issues around Kenyan politics and technology.

She is a prolific speaker, contributing to discussions on African politics, specifically Kenya, migration, feminism and the digital age, at the University of Edinburgh, SOAS, and Stanford University.

Nyabola has been an invited speaker at numerous international conferences on the politics of the digital age, including re:publica 2018 and 2019, the 2018 Forum on Internet Freedom in Africa, and the 2019 RightsCon in Tunis. She gave the opening keynote at the 2022 Association of Internet Researchers conference.

== Works ==
=== Books ===
- 2020: Travelling While Black: Essays Inspired by a Life on the Move – a collection of essays published by Hurst Publishers. The essays analyse the radicalised experience of travelling as "a middle-class, mobile, Black African female" and is interspersed with "personal stories that are witty, moving, unsettling, and harrowing in turn". The book was positively received and featured in The Times Literary Supplement and NPR among others. Ranka Primorac writes that the book "has sharp and urgent things to say about racism in America, xenophobia in Africa, and the future of Pan-Africanism".
- 2018: Digital Democracy, Analogue Politics: How the Internet Era is Transforming Politics in Kenya was published by Zed Books. A review in African Studies Quarterly described it as a "highly refreshing, innovative, and descriptive narrative sheds light on contemporary Kenya, highlighting the impact of technology on its political and social systems". It received positive reviews from LSE Review of Books, Duncan Green, Business Daily Africa, between the lines podcast from the Institute of Development Studies and the Africa Oxford Initiative podcast at the University of Oxford. Nyabola has given book talks at numerous universities including the Berkman Klein Center for Internet & Society at Harvard University, the University of the Witwatersrand, School of International and Public Affairs, Columbia University, Stanford University Center on Philanthropy and Civil Society and the University of Cambridge. The book is cited in a Financial Times article on the fight to control Africa's digital revolution.
- 2018: Where Women Are: Gender & The 2017 Kenyan Elections (co-edited with Marie-Emmanuelle Pommerolle) was published by Heinrich-Boell-Stiftung and Twaweza Communications Ltd.
- 2022: Strange and Difficult Times: Notes on a Global Pandemic was published by Hurst Publishers. The essays address the global COVID-19 pandemic from Nyabola's vantage point in East Africa and as a global traveler subjected to lockdown. Interspersed with a personal account she also "examines the biases, assumptions and failures in Western responses to the COVID-19 pandemic, and touches on the ways in which the pandemic has exacerbated global inequalities." An excerpt was published in The Johannesburg Review of Books.

=== Book chapters ===
- "Testimony as Text: Performative Vulnerability and the Limits of Legalistic Approaches to Refugee Protection". In African Women Under Fire: Literary Discourses in War and Conflict, published in 2017 by Rowman & Littlefield.
- "Media Perspectives: Social Media and New Narratives: Kenyans Tweet Back". Chapter in Africa's Media Image in the 21st Century: From the 'Heart of Darkness' to 'Africa Rising', published in 2016 by Routledge

=== Papers ===
- Nyabola, Nanjala. “Kenyan Feminisms in the Digital Age.” Women’s Studies Quarterly, vol. 46, no. 3 & 4, 2018, pp. 261–72. JSTOR, https://www.jstor.org/stable/26511346. Accessed 7 June 2024.
