= Foreign Policy Interrupted =

The organization Foreign Policy Interrupted (FPI) was launched in 2014 to address the disparity between female and male foreign policy expert representation in the media. According to the Op-Ed Project, in 2011, women authored only 19 percent of op-eds in The Wall Street Journal, 22 percent in The New York Times, and 24 percent in the Los Angeles Times. In collaboration with Media Matters for America, FPI conducted an analysis of foreign policy guests on major news programs. In 2014, 22 percent of guests were women, and trained female foreign policy experts received less coverage than that.

To increase the number of female voices in foreign policy journalism, FPI designed a fellowship program, which includes media training and meaningful mentoring at partnering media institutions, including Foreign Affairs and Foreign Policy. In addition, FPI publishes a weekly newsletter that highlights foreign policy articles authored by women and interviews of female foreign policy experts.

FPI is led by co-founders Elmira Bayrasli and Lauren Bohn.

== FPI Fellowship Recipients ==
As of early 2017, there have been four classes of fellows.

Inaugural Class

- Mira Rapp-Hooper
- Manal Omar
- H. Nanjala Nyabola
- Jen Weedon

Second Class

- Yolande Bouka
- Cori Crider
- Elina Ribakova
- Irene S. Wu

Third Class

- Séverine Autesserre
- Kamissa Camara
- Kate Himes
- Maria Snegovaya

Fourth Class

- Anne-Marie Brady
- Asha Bastleberry
- Alice Driver
- Lauren Kosa
- Fabiana Perera
- Elizabeth Radin
- Erin Stuckey
