= The Asia Group =

American strategic advisory firm

- Industry: Consulting
- Founded: 2013
- Founder: Kurt M. Campbell; Nirav Patel
- Headquarters: Washington, DC
- Key people: Richard Verma
- Website: theasiagroup.com

The Asia Group (TAG) is an American strategic advisory firm based in Washington D.C., providing consulting services to companies looking to expand into the Asia-Pacific region.

== History ==
TAG was co-founded in 2013 by Kurt Campbell, former U.S. Assistant Secretary of State for East Asian and Pacific Affairs, and Nirav Patel, former U.S. Deputy Assistant Secretary of State for Strategy and Multilateral Affairs.

== Executives ==
On June 21, 2017, TAG announced that former US Ambassador to India Richard Verma would be joining the firm as its Vice Chairman. In 2019, former US Consul General in Hong Kong Kurt Tong joined the firm as partner. In January 2021, Campbell left the firm to serve as National Security Council coordinator for the Indo-Pacific, and is now Deputy Secretary of State. Campbell's personal consulting clients at TAG included Northrop Grumman, McKinsey & Company, Raytheon, and Lockheed Martin.
