= Elmira Bayrasli =

American political scientist

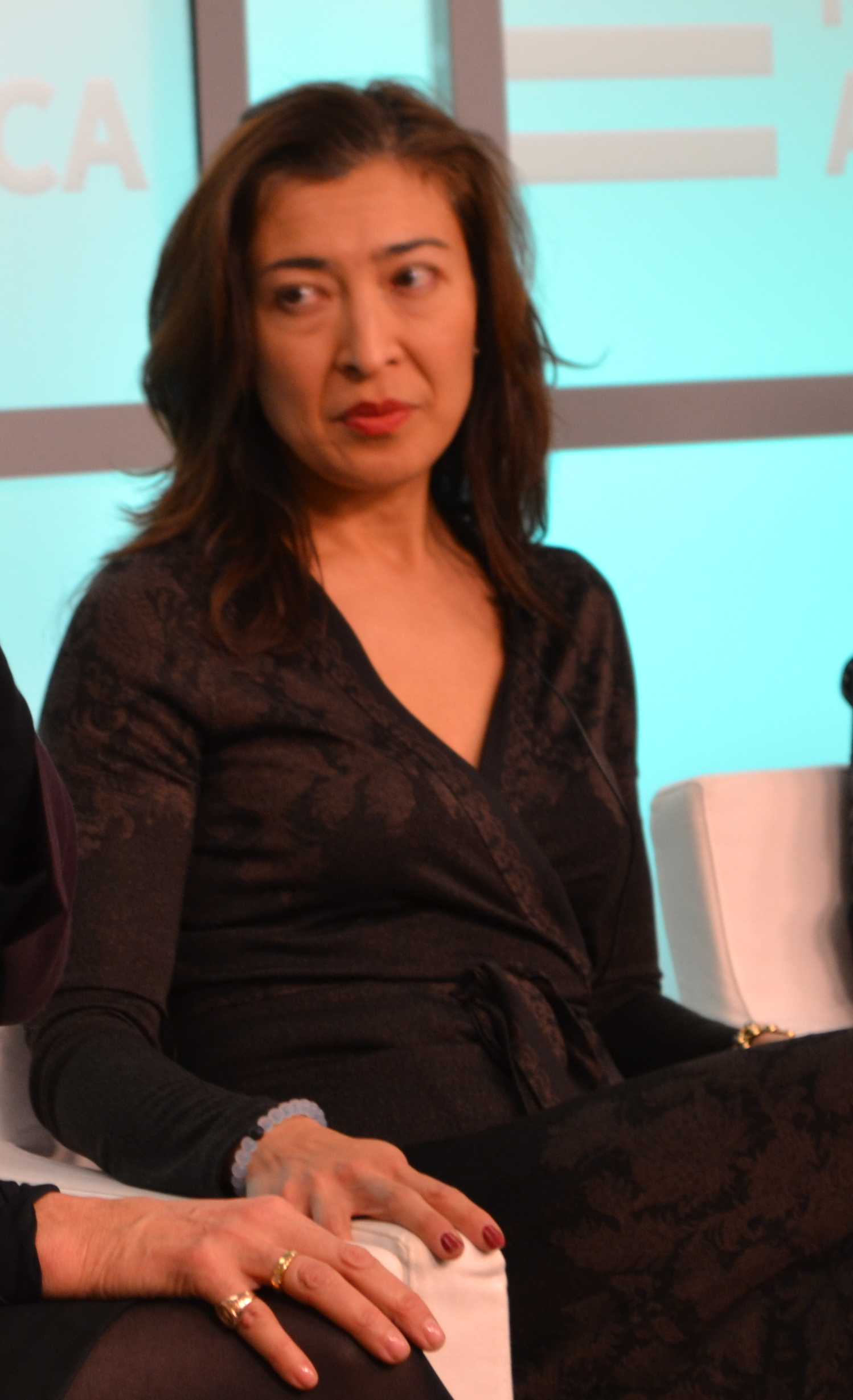
- Bayrasli in 2015
- Education: New York University (BA); Columbia University (MA)
- Occupations: Professor; author
- Known for: Co-founder of Foreign Policy Interrupted

Elmira Bayrasli is an American author and professor who focuses on foreign policy and global entrepreneurship. She is the author of the book From the Other Side of the World: Extraordinary Entrepreneurs, Unlikely Places (2015), co-founder of Foreign Policy Interrupted, and the host of the Project Syndicate podcast Opinion Has It.

Bayrasli is the Director of the Globalization and International Affairs Program at Bard College and is also an adjunct professor at New York University.

== Early life and education ==
Bayrasli earned a Bachelor of Arts (B.A.) in political science from New York University. She subsequently received a Master of Arts (M.A.) in Middle Eastern languages and literature from Columbia University.

== Career ==
In 1994, Bayrasli began her career working for Madeleine Albright at the U.S. Mission to the United Nations. After President Bill Clinton's re-election in 1996, she received a presidential appointment to the U.S. State Department, where she served in the office of the Secretary of State.

Bayrasli co-founded Foreign Policy Interrupted, an organization focused on amplifying female voices in foreign policy. She is the author of the 2015 book From the Other Side of the World: Extraordinary Entrepreneurs, Unlikely Places, which examines entrepreneurship in countries like Mexico, Turkey, and Nigeria. Her writing on foreign policy and entrepreneurship has appeared in The New York Times, Forbes, and TechCrunch.

In January 2020, Bayrasli was appointed Director of Bard College’s Globalization and International Affairs Program, where she had previously been a lecturer. She also teaches at New York University.

Bayrasli is a member of the Council on Foreign Relations.

== Bibliography ==
- Bayrasli, Elmira (2015). From the Other Side of the World: Extraordinary Entrepreneurs, Unlikely Places. PublicAffairs. ISBN 9781610393034.
