= How Terrorism Ends: Understanding the Decline and Demise of Terrorist Campaigns =

2009 book by Audrey Kurth Cronin

- Cover
- Author: Audrey Kurth Cronin
- Language: English
- Subject: Terrorism, counterterrorism
- Genre: Non-fiction
- Publisher: Princeton University Press
- Publication date: August 24, 2009
- Pages: 336
- Awards: Choice Outstanding Academic Title (2010)
- ISBN: 978-0-691-13948-7
- Dewey Decimal: 363.325
- LC Class: HV6431.C766 2009

How Terrorism Ends: Understanding the Decline and Demise of Terrorist Campaigns is a 2009 book by Audrey Kurth Cronin. Cronin presents a framework identifying six recurring patterns through which terrorist campaigns have historically ended: decapitation (capture or killing of leaders), negotiation, success in achieving objectives, failure through implosion or loss of popular support, repression by state force, and reorientation toward other forms of violence such as criminality or insurgency. Based on comparative case studies and statistical analysis of 457 terrorist organizations active since 1968, Cronin argues that terrorist groups rarely achieve their strategic aims and typically have a median lifespan of approximately eight years.

== Summary ==
Cronin traces the historical patterns through which terrorist campaigns have concluded. She argues that understanding these endpoints is essential for developing effective counterterrorism strategy. The book responds to what Cronin describes as an imbalance in terrorism studies, where much scholarship focuses on causes and tactics while comparatively little attention has been paid to how campaigns actually terminate, despite extensive historical experience spanning two centuries.

Cronin presents terrorism as a dynamic involving three strategic actors rather than a simple dichotomous struggle between group and state.The three strategic actors are: the terrorist group, the targeted government, and various audiences influenced by the violence. From this framework, she identifies six recurring patterns through which terrorist campaigns decline and end. The first pathway studies decapitation, the capture or killing of group leaders, analyzing cases such as Peru's Sendero Luminoso following the arrest of Abimael Guzmán, the Kurdistan Workers' Party after Abdullah Öcalan's capture, the Real Irish Republican Army, and Aum Shinrikyo. Cronin suggests that arresting leaders tends to be more effective than assassinating them, as imprisonment demystifies leaders and demonstrates the power of the state's legal institutions, though outcomes depend significantly on the group's organizational structure and degree of reliance on the leader.

The second pathway addresses negotiations. The author explores when and why governments and terrorist organizations enter talks. She includes various case studies including the Northern Ireland peace process, Israeli-Palestinian negotiations, and discussions with the Tamil Tigers. The author finds that after groups survive past approximately five or six years, refusing to negotiate does not clearly shorten their campaigns more than entering talks prolongs them. She also identifies seven factors that influence whether negotiations are likely to succeed—including stalemate, leadership strength, the role of sponsors, suicide campaigns, splintering, spoilers, and the broader political context.

Success as a pathway to ending terrorism is rare. Cronin cites Irgun Zvai Le'umi in the context of Israeli independence and the African National Congress's Umkhonto we Sizwe in South Africa as among the few cases where groups achieved their strategic aims. Statistical analysis of 457 terrorist organizations active since 1968 indicates a median lifespan of approximately eight years, with the overwhelming majority failing to achieve their objectives. Failure, by contrast, is common: groups implode through generational transitions, internal disputes, loss of operational control, or acceptance of amnesties, and they become marginalized through diminishing popular support, ideological irrelevance, or backlash provoked by targeting errors. Case studies include the left-wing groups of the 1970s such as the Red Army Faction, the Colombian group M-19, and the Real IRA following its repudiation after the 1998 Omagh bombing.

Repression, defined as crushing terrorist campaigns through military and police force, forms another pathway. Cases include Russia's suppression of Narodnaya Volya in the nineteenth century, Peru's campaign against Sendero Luminoso, Turkey's response to the Kurdistan Workers' Party, Uruguay's defeat of the Tupamaros, Russian actions in Chechnya, and Egypt's confrontation with the Muslim Brotherhood. The analysis distinguishes between three terrorist strategies (provocation, polarization, and mobilization) and considers when forceful state responses prove effective or counterproductive. Cronin highlights that even successful repression may undermine the legitimacy of the state.

The final pathway considers reorientation, where terrorism ends because the violence transitions into other forms rather than ceasing entirely, whether toward criminality (as with elements of Colombia's FARC and the Philippine Abu Sayyaf) or escalation toward insurgency and conventional warfare (as in Algeria with the GIA and the Kashmir conflict). The book argues that the end of terrorism does not necessarily mean the beginning of peace, and that the connections between terrorism, insurgency, and conventional war hold important lessons for understanding conflict in the twenty-first century.

In the final section of the book, Cronin applies the six-part framework specifically to al-Qaeda She assesses which historical lessons remain relevant given al-Qaeda's distinctive characteristics: its resilient structure, methods of radicalization, means of support, and exploitation of global communications. The author suggests that while decapitation, repression, and the achievement of strategic success offer limited or no promise for ending al-Qaeda, other opportunities exist through exploiting some of the movement's internal contradictions, targeting its relationship with popular support, and carefully calibrating negotiations with peripheral elements of the broader movement.

Cronin argues that terrorism virtually always fails as a strategy, provided that states avoid ceding power through disproportionate or poorly conceived responses.

== Critics ==
Thomas Hegghammer from the Norwegian Defence Research Establishment considered the work as "a pioneering and extremely valuable study that opens up a whole new line of inquiry in the study of terrorism." Hegghammer described it as the first systematic study of terrorist campaign termination and welcomed how Cronin demonstrated that the factors shaping group endings are not simply the negatives of those causing group emergence. However, the reviewer thought that the analysis did not go far in addressing the deeper question of why campaigns end the way they do, and found the treatment of failure as an independent causal variable problematic.

In his review, American political scientist James M. Lutz observed that the conclusions about dealing with al-Qaeda were pointedly at odds with some national counterterrorism strategies, yet remained valid, and he praised the appendices for providing statistical information often lacking in terrorism studies. Lutz considered the volume "one of the more important works to appear in recent years" on terrorism.

Philip J. Palin praised the conceptual framework as a practical tool for studying both historical and unfolding events. Palin described the book as helpful to "strategist and tactician, academic and practitioner." He found the book's empirical foundation robust, built on analysis of 457 terrorist organizations, while the author avoids weighing down readers with regression tables. Palin called for more extensive application of the framework to al-Qaeda, especially around negotiations with peripheral elements and exploitation of the group's self-destructive tendencies.

In her review, Maria Rasmussen also pointed out that several cases illustrated how particular campaigns of violence abated rather than definitively ended, particularly in the chapter on reorientation, but credited Cronin for producing a well-researched book that would likely incite debate. Rasmussen found the six possible endings were not mutually exclusive, as the IRA and its offshoots illustrated four of the six pathways. She considered the book as "a bold first attempt to think about the problem" of how terrorism ends.

Daniel Byman found Cronin's study of counterterrorism methods (such as leadership elimination and state repression) as well as her work on how terrorist organizations collapse internally or lose public backing, to be directly applicable to understanding the evolution of Al-Qaeda. Byman used Cronin's work to support his argument that "AQ affiliates do better when they focus on local issues rather than the struggle against the West."

Ivan Arreguin-Toft of the Belfer Center for Science and International Affairs thought that the book provides a "fascinating and useful history of terror groups and how these groups ended." Arreguin-Toft praised the thematic structured, and considered it is well-organized. However, he mentioned that Cronin's previous work "remains among the best scholarship in print on the subject of terrorism and counterterrorism" and wrote that despite its shortcomings, it remains "a must-read for those interested in terrorism in its transnational contexts."

== Notes ==
- The book is supplemented by an appendix presenting statistical analysis of the 457 terrorist organizations studied. Cronin provides data on group longevity, engagement in negotiations, and achievement of strategic objectives.
