= Power to the People: How Open Technological Innovation Is Arming Tomorrow's Terrorists =

2020 book by Audrey Kurth Cronin

- Cover
- Author: Audrey Kurth Cronin
- Language: English
- Subject: Terrorism, technology, national security
- Genre: Non-fiction
- Publisher: Oxford University Press
- Publication date: January 23, 2020
- Publication place: United States
- Media type: Print (hardcover, paperback), e-book, audiobook
- Pages: 440
- Awards: Airey Neave Book Prize (2020)
- ISBN: 978-0-19-088214-3

Power to the People: How Open Technological Innovation Is Arming Tomorrow's Terrorists is a 2020 book by American security scholar Audrey Kurth Cronin. The author argues that accessible, inexpensive, and easily modified technologies have historically shifted power from states to violent non-state actors, a pattern Cronin calls "lethal empowerment". Using historical case studies of dynamite and the Kalashnikov assault rifle, Cronin traces how these technologies fueled waves of anarchist terrorism and anti-colonial insurgency, then applies the same framework to contemporary technologies including drones, robotics, and artificial intelligence. The book won the 2020 Airey Neave Book Prize and was shortlisted for the Lionel Gelber Prize.

== Summary ==
Cronin traces how accessible, commercially available technologies have historically enabled political violence by non-state actors and analyzes how contemporary emerging technologies may pose similar risks. The book's central argument is that technologies which are accessible, cheap, simple to use, transportable, concealable, effective, multi-use, not cutting-edge, easily purchased, part of a cluster of other emerging technologies, symbolically resonant, and susceptible to unexpected uses tend to diffuse rapidly to terrorists, insurgents, and other violent non-state actors, thereby shifting power away from states. Cronin terms this framework "lethal empowerment theory".

In the beginning of the book, there is a theoretical section that distinguishes between "closed" technological revolutions, in which access to emerging capabilities is restricted to states and elites (as with nuclear weapons), and "open" revolutions, in which the public can freely acquire, modify, and repurpose new technologies. Based on David Rapoport's "four waves of modern terrorism" model to structure its narrative, and incorporating insights from business innovation theory, this section establishes criteria for predicting which technologies are most likely to become tools of political violence.

The historical core of the book comprises detailed case studies of two technologies that Cronin argues fueled global waves of non-state violence. The first is dynamite, patented by Alfred Nobel in 1867 for industrial use in mining and construction. Despite Nobel's commercial intentions, the explosive was swiftly adopted by anarchists and revolutionaries, enabling a wave of bombings in fifty-two countries between 1867 and 1934 that assassinated heads of state, destabilized governments, and contributed to the conditions leading to the First World War. Cronin examines the role of anarchist publications, the 1881 International Anarchist Convention's endorsement of "propaganda of the deed", and the rapid global diffusion of dynamite factories in making the explosive widely available. She presents data showing that dynamite attacks increased in inverse correlation with the price of the explosive. The second case study focuses on the Kalashnikov assault rifle, developed in the Soviet Union after the Second World War. Initially kept secret under Stalin, the weapon was subsequently disseminated by the Soviet government to allies and proxy forces around the world as a form of currency and instrument of political influence. Its simplicity, durability, low cost, ease of use, and symbolic resonance as a revolutionary brand made it the weapon of choice for anti-colonial insurgents, and Cronin links its spread to a notable increase in insurgent success rates during the post-1945 era.

Cronin explores how clusters of contemporary and emerging technologies are converging to provide non-state actors with new capabilities for mobilization, extended reach, and command and control. Social media platforms, she argues, have transformed recruiting, radicalizing, and coordinating individuals for political violence—figures such as Anwar al-Awlaki have used online video to inspire attacks long after their deaths. Commercial drones, 3D printing, robotics, and autonomous systems share many characteristics with dynamite and the Kalashnikov: they are accessible to ordinary consumers, improving rapidly, and susceptible to weaponization. She also addresses the implications of advancing autonomy and artificial intelligence, including the prospect of swarming systems, self-driving vehicle-borne weapons, and the vulnerabilities created by the Internet of Things.

Cronin also presents policy recommendations for democratic governments. She argues that technology companies should assume greater responsibility for anticipating misuse of their products, that sensible regulation need not stifle innovation, and that states must invest in both defensive measures and civic education to reduce societal vulnerabilities.

== Critical reception ==
Luigi Lonardo found the book engaging and readable, filled with anecdotes and concrete examples that enlivened the narrative. He acknowledged the work's originality in merging business studies insights with historical accounts of dynamite and the Kalashnikov, though he judged the explanation of why terrorists adopt particular technologies unilluminating, noting that the causal mechanisms linking economic conditions or technological accessibility to increased violence remained implied rather than unpacked. He praised the policy response Cronin advocated, particularly the call for private companies to bear responsibility for the dangerous applications of their products, and predicted this argument would shape future policy debates. Lonardo concluded that the book's non-academic style and urgent subject matter made it accessible to general readers, though its primary appeal lay with policymakers and scholars of terrorism and political violence.

In his review, Lawrence Freedman stressed how Cronin did not seek to halt innovation but rather urged governments to develop countermeasures that would preempt militants from co-opting emerging technologies for catastrophic purposes.

George Lucas distinguished the monograph from literature characterized by technological fearmongering and credited the author with constructing a compelling argument regarding threats posed by affordable, off-the-shelf technologies. Lucas endorsed her "lethal empowerment theory" and traced her historical parallels between the unintended proliferation of dynamite or the AK-47 and the contemporary weaponization of artificial intelligence and the Internet of Things. Citing the recent release of a Kalashnikov suicide drone as confirmation of her warnings, Lucas thought that the diffusion of such accessible technologies portended a dangerous future for global security.

Jonathon Keats described the monograph as superbly researched and richly detailed in its treatment of technologies appropriated for violence. Keats welcomed Cronin's analysis of how open innovation permitted amateurs to repurpose benevolent inventions like dynamite into instruments of terror, a pattern that recurred with the global diffusion of the AK-47.

Aldon Thomas Stiles traced distinction between open and closed revolutions in the book. Stiles pointed to Cronin's historical analyses of dynamite and the Kalashnikov as precursors to contemporary threats involving commercial drones and social media. While he affirmed the text's effectiveness in contextualizing violent innovation, Stiles thought it could have touched on the ideological dimensions of the eras under discussion more thoroughly. He considered the work relevant and an unsettling assessment of future security vulnerabilities.

Capt Matthew H. Ormsbee considered the monograph as a warning of the dual-use technology yet questioned the assertion that inventors like Nobel and Kalashnikov could not have foreseen the violent applications of their creations. Ormsbee found the repurposing of social media unsurprising and maintained that contemporary developers bear greater accountability for misuse than their historical counterparts. While Ormsbee welcomed the historical narratives on subversion, he faulted the final chapters for drifting into tangential technical details and criticized the text for lacking actionable recommendations.

=== ISS Forum roundtable ===
A roundtable discussion about the book was organized by H-Diplo and the International Security Studies Forum.

Randall Law hailed the monograph as a vital contribution to terrorism studies. Law thought that the book's success lies in explaining how open-source innovations reshape strategy. He welcomed the transparency of Cronin's datasets and her alignment of historical narrative with social science. Law did, however, reject the reliance on the "Four Waves" model. This framework, he argued, erased key antecedents like the Ku Klux Klan. Despite this historical blind spot, Law thought that the arguments about disruptive technology remained sound.

Deborah Avant dismissed the "lethal empowerment" theory for relying on a binary where states ensure order and non-state actors foment anarchy. Avant argued that this framework ignored how technology facilitates state malevolence. She warned that Cronin's regulatory proposals risked smothering innovation, as the traits making tools dangerous often render them useful. Avant also criticized the total reliance on state authority, advocating instead for distributed governance involving private firms and civil society.

Boyd P. Brown focused on unintended consequences, emphasizing Cronin's dichotomy between "closed" military innovations and "open" commercial technologies. Brown validated the historical continuity linking the proliferation of dynamite and the Kalashnikov to the modern spread of drones. He thought that accessibility allowed non-state actors to negate conventional military advantages. Brown also highlighted the economic concept of a "new feudalism". In new feudalism, reliance on proprietary software creates distinct security vulnerabilities. Brown judged the text as vital for comprehending contemporary terrorism.

Jennifer Spindel thought that the text's concentration on jihadist terrorism risked obscuring broader insights into why certain violent narratives gained traction while others did not. Spindel called for deeper engagement with white nationalist violence. Spindel argued for elevating private corporations as central geopolitical actors and directed scholars to investigate how digital networks drive mobilization and reconfigure the nature of warfare.

==== Response by the author ====
Cronin wrote a response to the reviewers. She framed her work as an effort to address the data gap persistent about technological innovation in political violence prior to 1970. She distinguished her focus on lethal emerging technologies from broader internet governance scholarship and defended her selection of the Kalashnikov as a case study on the grounds of its statistically unparalleled impact on global violence. While she conceded that the book's concentration on jihadist groups reflected the geopolitical context during the writing process, Cronin pointed to her treatment of right-wing extremism and affirmed that domestic violent actors had already begun reshaping contemporary conceptions of warfare.

== Prizes and shortlists ==
=== Won ===
- The 2020 Airey Neave Book Prize

=== Shortlists ===
- The Lionel Gelber Prize (2020)
