= Center for a New American Security =

American think tank

- Abbreviation: CNAS
- Formation: 2007; 19 years ago
- Type: Public policy think tank
- Tax ID no.: 20-8084828
- Headquarters: 1701 Pennsylvania Avenue NW, Suite 700
- Location: Washington, D.C.
- Coordinates: 38°54′18″N 77°02′06″W
- CEO: Richard Fontaine
- Budget: Revenue: $8,789,410; Expenses: $7,228,402 (FYE September 2015)
- Website: www.cnas.org

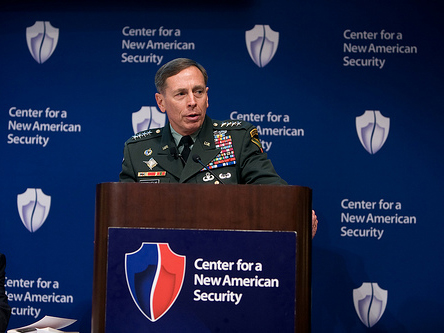
GEN David Petraeus at CNAS's annual conference, June 2009

The Center for a New American Security (CNAS) is a think tank in Washington, D.C., specializing in United States national security issues, including terrorism, irregular warfare, the future of the U.S. military, the emergence of Asia as a global power, war games pitting the U.S. against the People's Republic of China, and the national security implications of natural resource consumption, among others.

CNAS has strong ties to the Democratic Party. It was founded in 2007 by Michèle Flournoy, who served as deputy assistant secretary of defense for strategy under President Bill Clinton and under secretary of defense for policy under President Barack Obama, and Kurt M. Campbell, who previously served as deputy secretary of state in the Biden administration. The Obama administration hired several CNAS employees for key positions. In June 2009, The Washington Post wrote that in the Obama era, CNAS "may emerge as Washington's go-to think tank on military affairs." CNAS was formerly led by CEO Victoria Nuland, who served as undersecretary of state for political affairs from 2021 to 2024 in the Biden administration's State Department.

CNAS has received funding from large corporations, including some defense contractors. Donors have included Northrop Grumman, Chevron, Amazon, and Google. This has prompted criticism of CNAS from left-wing media outlets, with In These Times saying in October 2019 that the organization has "long pushed Democrats to embrace war and militarism."

== Employees, budget, and writings ==
CNAS has approximately fifty employees and a budget under $6 million. It has many fellows and advisors. CNAS members include, among others, John Nagl, Thomas E. Ricks, Stacie Pettyjohn and Robert D. Kaplan. The organization's top donors include Northrop Grumman Aerospace Systems, Open Society Foundations, Airbus Group, The Boeing Company, Chevron Corporation, Lockheed Martin Corporation, Raytheon Company, the Taipei Economic and Cultural Representative Office, the United States government, BAE Systems, BP America and Exxon Mobil Corporation.

CNAS commentators have been quoted in national media outlets such as Foreign Policy, The New York Times, The Washington Post, The Wall Street Journal, The National Interest, C-SPAN, NBC, Fox News, NPR.

== Research and initiatives ==
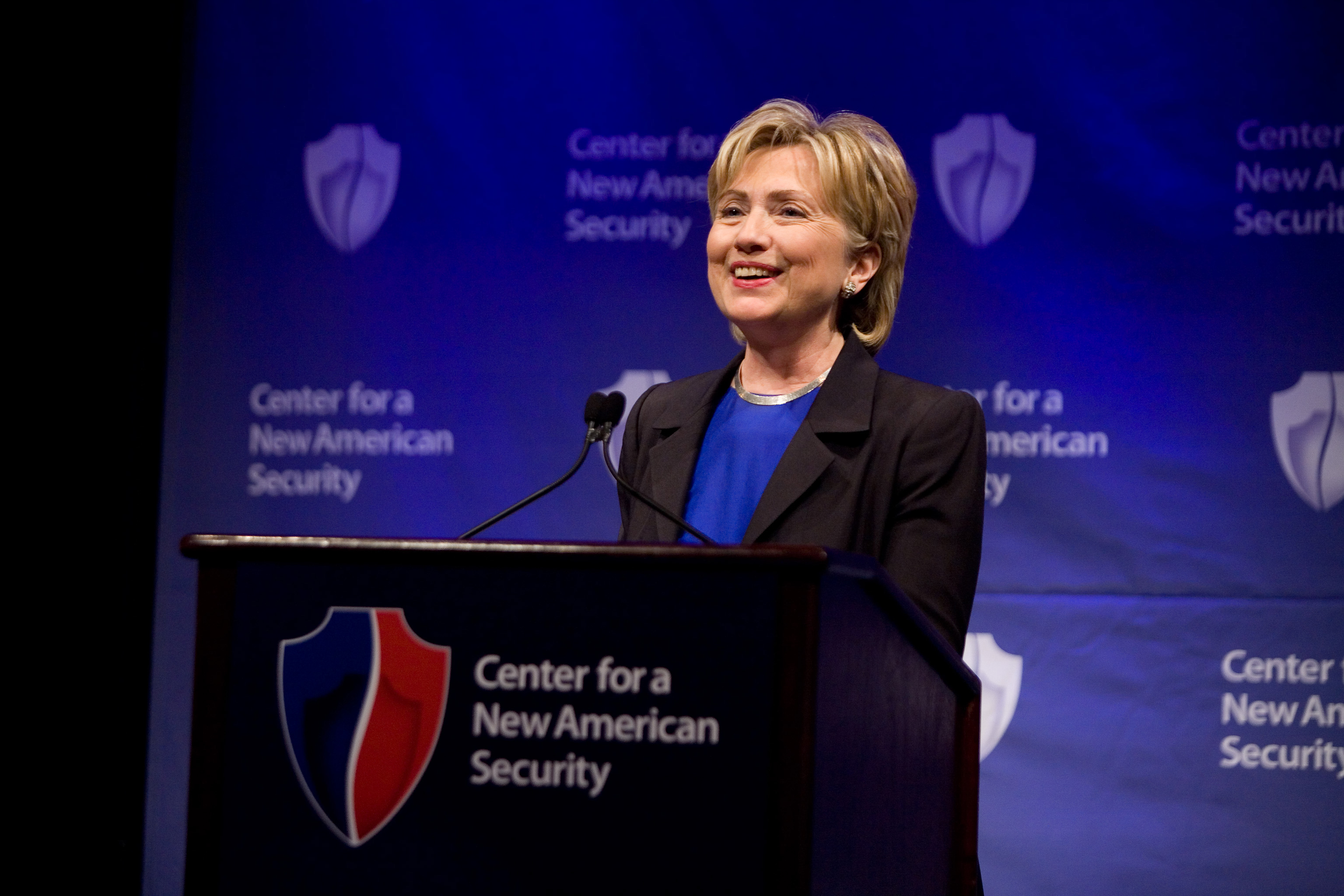
Hillary Clinton speaks at CNAS's rollout event, June 2007.

The CNAS U.S.-India Initiative is co-chaired by CNAS Board of Directors members Richard Armitage, former deputy secretary of state, and Ambassador R. Nicholas Burns, former under secretary of state for political affairs. The stated goal of the Initiative is to help advance growing bilateral ties in areas of mutual interest, including security, economics, energy, climate change, democracy, and human rights. On October 27, 2010, at the White House Press Gaggle on the President's Upcoming Trip to India, the CNAS report Natural Allies: A Blueprint for the Future of U.S.-India Relations was referenced in a reporter's question to White House Press Secretary Robert Gibbs.

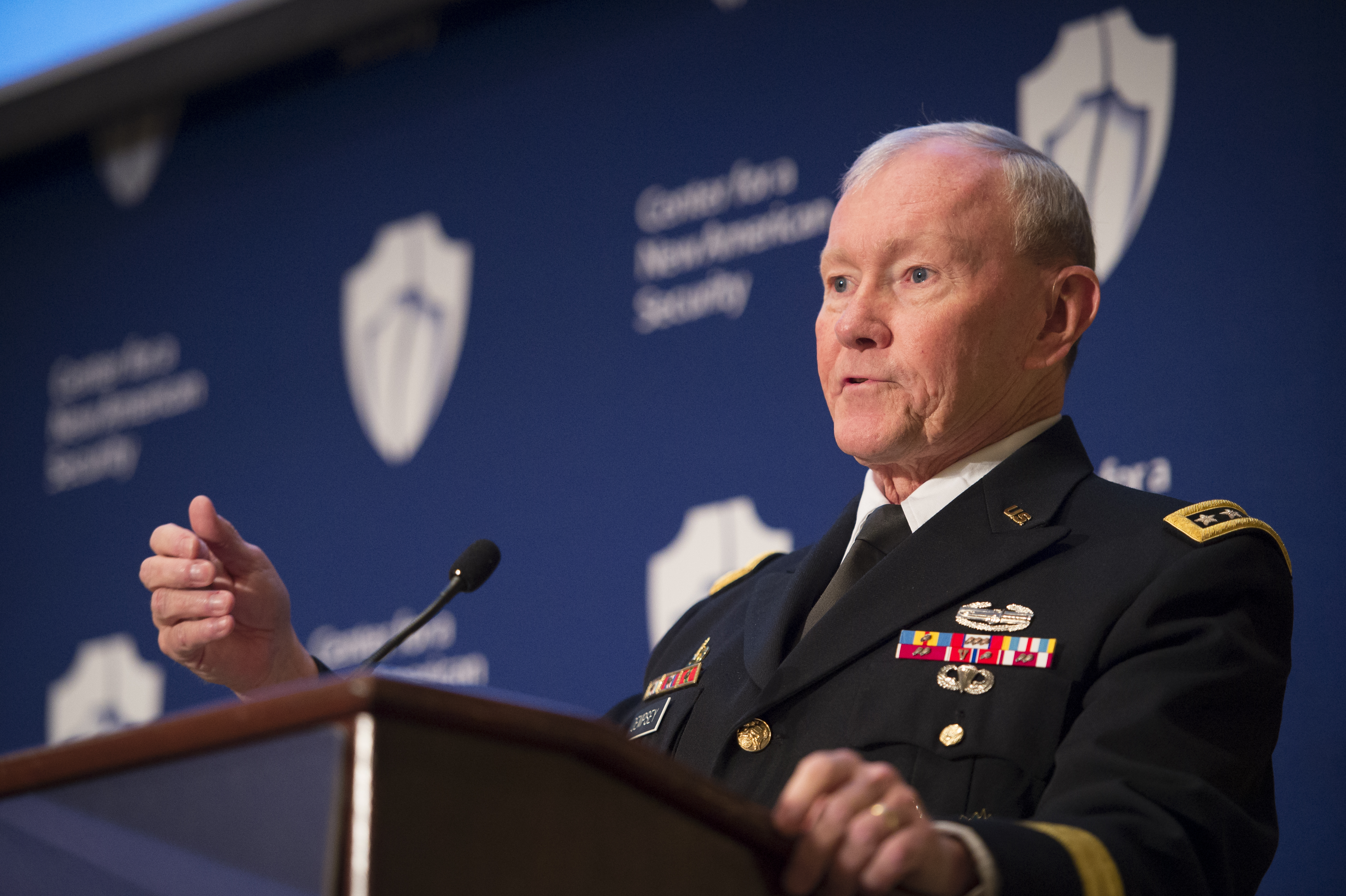
Gen. Martin E. Dempsey speaking at CNAS, November 2014

In 2010, the center developed its cyber security project was co-chaired by Bob Kahn, John Michael McConnell, Joseph Nye and Peter Schwartz. In February 2011, CNAS argued in The Hill that "increased federal attention to cybersecurity makes good sense," but "lawmakers must ensure that the U.S. government does not spend aimlessly on cybersecurity."

CNAS has suggested that one way to contain future military costs would be to move heavy army units into the Army National Guard and Army Reserve. Still, military officials have responded that the governors would rather have light units that are better suited to their emergency needs.

The CNAS has been actively involved in examining the implications of advanced technologies on future military conflicts, such as a potential conflict between Taiwan and China. In 2024, CNAS ran a war-gaming experiment, suggesting that underwater drones and increased autonomy in drone operations could play a critical role in shaping the dynamics of such a conflict. It also recommended the Quadrilateral Security Dialogue to collaborate more on joint exercises, interoperability, intelligence sharing, logistics, defense technology development and arms sales. In 2024, CNAS reported some weaknesses of the US Space Force.

=== Papers for the Next President Series ===
In May 2016, CNAS launched its Papers for the Next President series which it said would assist the next president and his team in crafting a strong, pragmatic, and principled national security agenda. The series explores the critical regions and topics that the next president will need to address early in his tenure and includes actionable recommendations designed to be implemented during the first few months of 2017. Since its inception, CNAS has released 12 reports on topics including U.S.-Russia Relations, transatlantic security cooperation in the Asia-Pacific, and U.S. strategy in the Middle East.

=== Next Generation National Security Leaders Fellowship ===
CNAS established the Next Generation National Security Leaders Fellowship in 2009, selecting an inaugural class for a program focused on national security policy and leadership development. In 2018, the program was renamed the Shawn Brimley Next Generation National Security Leaders Fellowship in honor of CNAS founding member Shawn Brimley.

==== Notable alumni ====
Members of Congress

- Mike Gallagher (2010–2011), former U.S. representative from Wisconsin.
- Maggie Goodlander (2011–2012), U.S. representative from New Hampshire.
- Pat Ryan (2012–2013), U.S. representative from New York.
- Riley Moore (2016), U.S. representative from West Virginia.

Other alumni

- Mara Karlin (2009–2010), former Assistant Secretary of Defense for Strategy, Plans, and Capabilities.
- Marie Harf (2010–2011), former deputy spokesperson for the U.S. Department of State.
- Oriana Skylar Mastro (2010–2011), political scientist and scholar of Chinese military and security policy.
- Mira Rapp-Hooper (2014), political scientist and former Special Assistant to the President and Senior Director for East Asia and Oceania at the National Security Council.
- Rush Doshi (2015), political scientist and former deputy senior director for China and Taiwan at the National Security Council.
- Edward Fishman (2016), author, scholar, and former U.S. Department of State official.
- Rebecca Friedman Lissner (2016), political scientist and former Deputy National Security Advisor to Vice President Kamala Harris.
- Desirée Cormier Smith (2019), former U.S. Special Representative for Racial Equity and Justice.

== Funding and controversy ==
Shortly after CNAS formed, it was noted by the Wall Street Journal and others that it was "rapidly emerging as a top farm team for the incoming Obama administration." When co-founder Kurt Campbell was questioned by Jim Webb before Congress about the potential for conflict, he replied, "We've kept a very clear line. Not one of our publications, not one of our public advocacies ever touches on anything that these companies worked on." However, according to a report by the Center for Economic and Policy Research's Revolving Door Project, the Center has repeatedly violated its own ethics policy without acknowledgement of the violations. For example, CNAS received $100,000 to $249,999 in funding from Taiwan in the fiscal years preceding a 2020 report to Washington on "Rising to the China Challenge," where they advised America should invest "considerable amounts of money, senior-level attention, and bureaucratic focus" to, among other things, "strengthen its diplomatic and security relationship with Taiwan". CNAS also received $250,000 from the United Arab Emirates embassy in 2016 to produce a private study on the Missile Technology Control Regime, which was later used to inform a public paper analyzing U.S. drone export policies.

CNAS has a board of advisors in addition to its board of directors that "actively contributes to the development of the Center's research and expands [their] community of interest," with members who "engage regularly with the intellectual power generated at CNAS, though they do not have official governance or fiduciary oversight responsibilities." Many advisory board members have donated to CNAS in prior years.

In addition, many involved in CNAS go on to become government employees. For example Victoria Nuland, who was the former CEO of CNAS, was President Biden's undersecretary of state for political affairs from May 3, 2021 - March 22, 2024. In one article she published after leaving the CNAS, she called for increased defense spending and weapons development, as well as to "establish permanent bases along NATO's eastern border." The governments of two nations on NATO's eastern border, Latvia and Lithuania, are recent contributors to CNAS.
