= John Nagl =

US Army lieutenant colonel (born 1966)

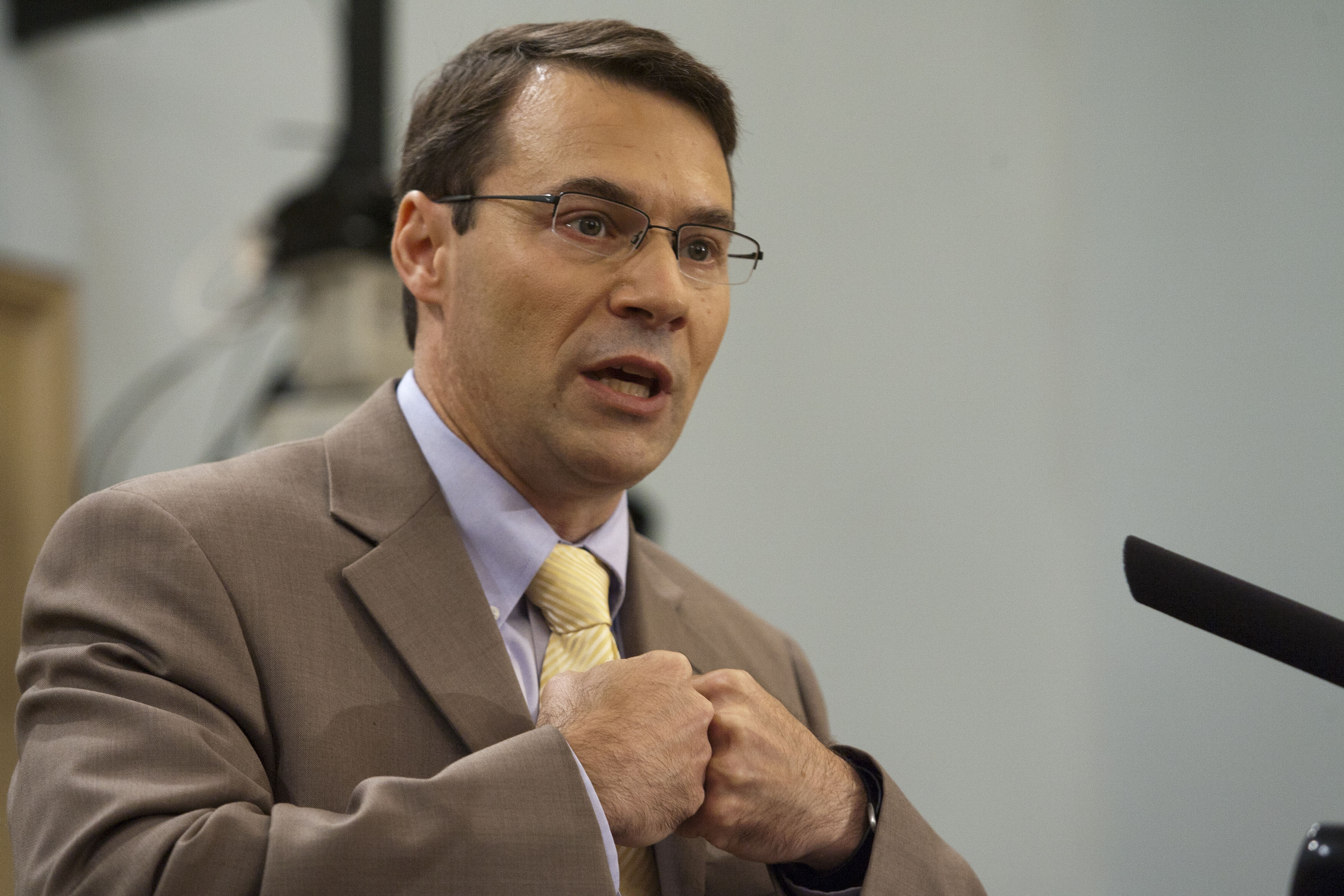
- John Nagl speaks at the Miller Center of Public Affairs, October 7, 2011
- Born: February 28, 1966 (age 60); Vallejo, California, U.S.
- Alma mater: United States Military Academy (BA); St John's College, Oxford (MPhil); St Antony's College, Oxford (DPhil)
- Military career
- Allegiance: United States
- Branch: United States Army
- Service years: 1988–2008
- Rank: Lieutenant Colonel
- Units: 1st Cavalry Division; 1st Armored Division; 24th Infantry Division; 34th Armor Regiment
- Commands: 1st Battalion, 34th Armor Regiment
- Conflicts: Operation Desert Storm; Operation Iraqi Freedom
- Awards: Bronze Star Medal

John Albert Nagl (born February 28, 1966) is a retired Lieutenant Colonel in the United States Army. He is a former president of the Center for a New American Security and former headmaster of The Haverford School. Nagl is an expert in counterinsurgency and has published two books on military strategy.

== Education and military career ==
Nagl was raised in Omaha, Nebraska, where he graduated from Creighton Preparatory School in 1984. He then attended the United States Military Academy at West Point, where he studied international relations and graduated near the top of his class in 1988. As a newly commissioned second lieutenant, he was chosen as a Rhodes Scholar and studied international relations at St John's College, Oxford, earning his MPhil in 1990.

Entering the Armor Branch of the US Army, Nagl led a tank platoon in the 1st Cavalry Division during the Gulf War. After returning from the Middle East, he commanded A Troop of the 1st Squadron, 1st Cavalry Regiment in the 1st Armored Division in Büdingen, Germany.

Nagl later returned to Oxford to earn his DPhil at St Antony's College in 1997. At Oxford, his focus was on counterinsurgency. Nagl's doctoral dissertation was a comparative study of the British and American militaries as they dealt with insurgencies in Malaya and Vietnam, respectively. While at Oxford, he wrote several book reviews in a variety of military journals, focusing initially on the history of armored warfare, and later on the Vietnam War and guerrilla warfare.

In 1997, Nagl was appointed as a social sciences professor at West Point. While teaching at West Point, he was affiliated with the Strategic Studies Institute at the United States Army War College for which he co-authored a book on military professionalism in 1999. He later received the George C. Marshall Award for being the top graduate of the US Army Command and General Staff College in 2001. A revised version of his dissertation was published in 2002 as Learning to Eat Soup with a Knife, titled after an observation made by T. E. Lawrence about the challenges of fighting guerrilla forces. He served as Deputy Chief of Staff for Operations and Plans for the 24th Infantry Division at Fort Riley, Kansas. Nagl deployed to Iraq in 2003 as the operations officer of the 1st Battalion, 34th Armor Regiment, 1st Infantry Division stationed near Khaldiya. While in Iraq, he was profiled in the New York Times Magazine in January 2004.

After returning from Iraq, Nagl served as military assistant to Paul Wolfowitz, then Deputy Secretary of Defense, and Wolfowitz's successor, Gordon England, until 2006. While he was military assistant to Wolfowitz and England, Nagl co-authored the new United States Army and Marine Corps Counterinsurgency field manual as part of a team overseen by Generals David Petraeus, the former director of the Central Intelligence Agency, and James N. Mattis, the former commander of United States Central Command.

In 2006, Nagl was given command of the 1st Battalion, 34th Armor Regiment to help train Embedded Training Teams, small groups of American soldiers tasked to develop the Afghan National Army and Iraqi security forces.

== Post-military career ==
Nagl retired from the Army and in 2008 became a fellow at the Center for a New American Security (CNAS) in Washington D.C. Many commentators, including CNAS fellow Andrew Exum and retired Marine Colonel Thomas X. Hammes, lamented his retirement because they saw it as a significant loss for the Army. There was some speculation that Nagl retired because he had been passed over for promotion or otherwise sidelined by the military, as happened to H.R. McMaster, because of his advocacy of counterinsurgency, which had fallen out of favour with senior commanders by 2008. However, Exum confirmed on his Abu Muqawama blog that Nagl was not eligible for promotion to Colonel in 2008 and argued that Nagl could have a greater influence on defense policy outside the military, particularly if he were allowed to serve in the Department of Defense by a future administration.

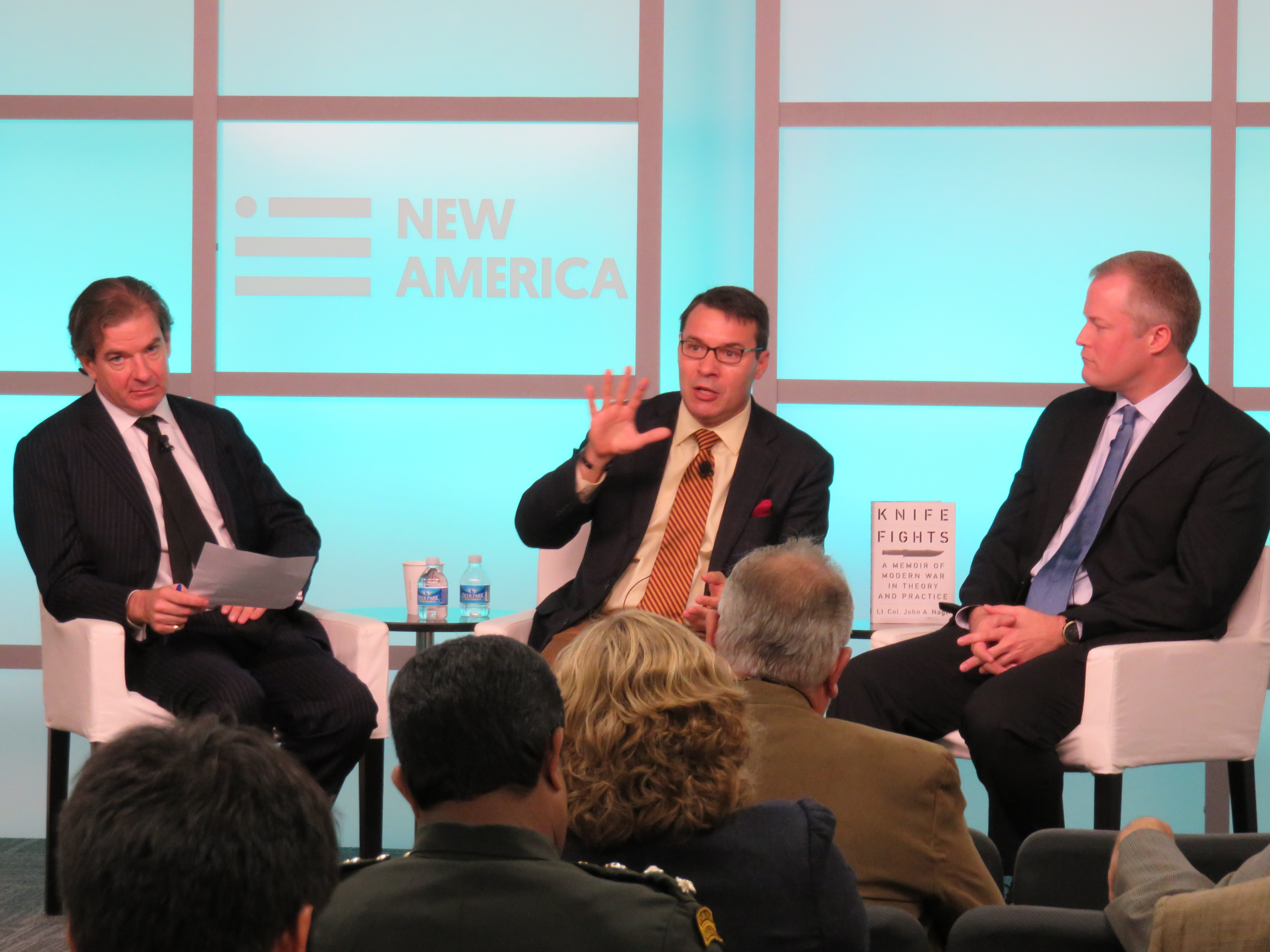
Left to right, Peter Bergen, John Nagl and Daniel R. Green, discussing Nagl's new book, Knife Fights: A Memoir of Modern War in Theory and Practice, at the New America Foundation, 27 October 2014

After CNAS's founders, Kurt M. Campbell and Michèle Flournoy, left CNAS to serve in the Obama administration, Nagl was named CNAS's president in February 2009 and served until January 2012. Nagl remains a non-resident senior fellow of CNAS. While at CNAS, he co-authored several reports on a wide range of issues, including counterinsurgency, Islamist extremism and the future of the American military. While he was still in the Army, Nagl wrote a report in 2007 for CNAS which advocates for the creation of a permanent Army advisory corps, a proposal that he argued for in an op-ed in the New York Times. His proposal for an advisory corps was favorably cited by American historian Max Boot in a New York Times op-ed about ways to modernize the State Department and the American military.

In January 2011, he and CNAS chief executive officer Nathaniel Fick wrote an op-ed in the New York Times supporting the Obama administration's troop surge and reporting on its early successes. In April 2011, he wrote favorably about President Obama decision to name Leon Panetta, then director of the CIA, as Secretary of Defense, and General David Petraeus, then commander of the International Security Assistance Force in Afghanistan, with whom Nagl had worked on the new Army/Marine Corps counterinsurgency manual, as director of the CIA, noting the increasingly intertwined nature of the relationship between the intelligence and defense establishments in the United States.

Nagl served on the Defense Policy Board, which advises the Secretary of Defense, Deputy Secretary of Defense and Under Secretary of Defense for Policy. He is also a life member of the Council on Foreign Relations. He taught in the Security Studies Program at Georgetown University in 2009 and is a visiting professor in the war studies department at King's College London. In January 2012, he was named the inaugural Minerva Chair at the US Naval Academy, where he joined the history department at the Naval Academy and conducted research on the relationship between culture and warfare. He taught a course on the history of counterinsurgency to midshipmen at the Naval Academy.

Dr. Nagl is an Advisory Board Member of Spirit of America, a 501(c)(3) organization that supports the safety and success of Americans serving abroad and the local people and partners they seek to help.

Already notable in military circles, his public profile was further raised with an interview on Comedy Central's The Daily Show in August 2007. He was also interviewed with fellow counterinsurgency experts Lewis Sorley and Conrad Crane on the Charlie Rose show about the similarities between counterinsurgency during the Iraq and Vietnam Wars in March 2006.

Nagl was appointed as headmaster of The Haverford School in August 2012.

In 2020, Nagl published an op-ed encouraging military action if President Donald Trump refused leaving office at the end of his constitutional term. Following the op-ed, Nagl apologized for writing the op-ed, which accurately predicted street protests and a troublesome transition of power following the election, and resigned from the headmaster position. While some parents speculated that the Haverford School forced Nagl to resign for political reasons, Nagl and the board of trustees maintained that it was Nagl's decision.

== Personal life ==
Nagl was the 9th Headmaster of The Haverford School. He lives in Haverford, Pennsylvania.

== Books ==
=== Authored ===
- Learning to Eat Soup with a Knife: Counterinsurgency Lessons from Malaya and Vietnam (2002) ISBN 0-275-97695-5 / paperback (2005) ISBN 0-226-56770-2. With a new preface by the author for the paperback edition.
- Knife Fights: A Memoir of Modern War in Theory and Practice (2014) ISBN 1594204985

=== Foreword by ===
- The U.S. Army/Marine Corps Counterinsurgency Field Manual (2007) ISBN 0-226-84151-0 / FM 3-24. Foreword by Nagl to the University of Chicago Press edition.
- Instructions for American Servicemen in Iraq during World War II (2007) ISBN 0-226-84170-7
- The New Counterinsurgency Era (2009) ISBN 978-1-58901-488-6
- Cohen, A. A. Galula: The Life and Writings of the French Officer who Defined the Art of Counterinsurgency. Foreword by John A. Nagl. Praeger, 2012. ISBN 978-1-4408-0049-8.
