= Séverine Autesserre =

French-American author and researcher (born 1976)

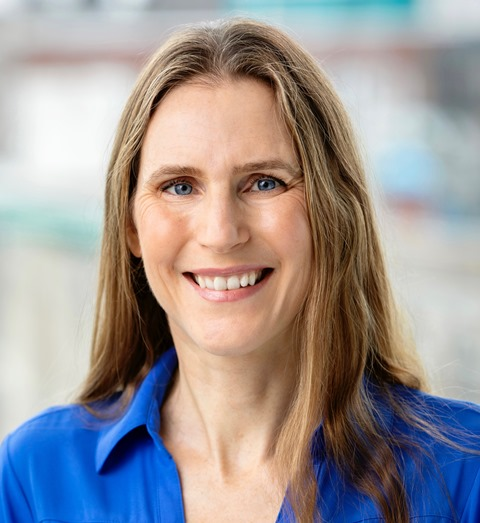
- Born: 6 December 1976 (age 49); Paris, France
- Occupations: Researcher and professor
- Title: Ann Whitney Olin Professor and Chair of Political Science at Barnard College, Columbia University

Academic background
- Education: Yale University (post-doctorate), New York University (Ph.D), Columbia University (master's degree), Sciences Po (master's degree), Sorbonne University (B.A.)

Academic work
- Notable works: Peaceland (2014), The Trouble with the Congo (2010) and The Frontlines of Peace (2021)
- Website: severineautesserre.com

Séverine Autesserre (born December 6, 1976) is a French-American author and researcher. She writes about war and peace, peacebuilding, peacekeeping, humanitarian aid, the ongoing conflict in the Democratic Republic of Congo, and African politics. Autesserre is the Ann Whitney Olin Professor and Chair of Political Science at Barnard College, Columbia University (New York, US), where she specializes in international relations and African studies. She previously worked for international humanitarian and development agencies.

== Education ==
Autesserre obtained her B.A. in political science from Sorbonne University in 1997. She earned her master's degree in international relations and political science from Sciences Po and Columbia University. In 2006, she completed her Ph.D. in political science from New York University and undertook post-doctorate studies at Yale University in 2007.

== Career ==
Autesserre's early research culminated in her first book, The Trouble with the Congo: Local Violence and the Failure of International Peacebuilding published in 2010. The book explains why international efforts to end civil wars often fail. Drawing on interviews and field research, Autesserre presents a case study of the international intervention during the Democratic Republic of Congo's unsuccessful transition from war to peace and democracy (2003–06) where she argues that local rivalries over land, resources, and political power motivated widespread violence. However, an international peacebuilding culture shaped the intervention strategy in a way that precluded action on local conflicts, ultimately dooming the international efforts.

Autessere's second book, Peaceland: Conflict Resolution and the Everyday Politics of International Intervention, was published in 2014 and translated in Spanish in 2018. The book suggests an explanation for why international peace interventions so often fail to reach their full potential. She demonstrates that everyday elements – such as expatriates’ social habits and common approaches to understanding their areas of operation – strongly influence peacebuilding effectiveness. Peaceland proposes ways to better help host populations build sustainable peace.

Autesserre's third book, The Frontlines of Peace: An Insider's Guide to Changing the World, was released by Oxford University Press in 2021 and translated in French and Japanese in 2023. Autesserre examines strategies that help build peace during and after mass violence. She highlights "ordinary yet extraordinary individuals and communities" that have decreased or ended violence in various parts of the world.

Autesserre has taught at New York University and Yale University. Since 2007, she teaches at Columbia University's Barnard College, School of International and Public Affairs, and Graduate School of Arts and Sciences. She teaches classes on African politics, international relations, and war and peace, and she chairs the Barnard Political Science Department. In 2021, Autesserre received Barnard College's Emily Gregory Award, a student-nominated award for excellence in teaching, and in 2024 she received the Ann Whitney Olin Foundation endowed chair.

According to Google Scholar, Autesserre's work has been cited in more than 6,000 scholarly texts, and according to Elsevier she ranks among the most cited authors in the world. She has been called "an authoritative voice" on international humanitarian interventions. Her publications on peacebuilding have helped shape intervention strategies for several United Nations departments, philanthropists, activists, and non-governmental organizations. She has testified before the U.S. Congress and the United Nations Security Council, and her research has been quoted in debates at the U.S. House of Representatives and the Canadian Parliament. Her publications have helped put local conflict resolution on the agenda of policy-makers and practitioners working in Congo. Autesserre is considered "one of the foremost thinkers on international peace-building" in the decade since 2010 by many of her colleagues, and in the 2020s the International Studies Association and the French government praised her work for “revolutioni[zing] the study and practice of peacebuilding, and of security studies more broadly.”

== Awards and honors ==
Autesserre's first paper won the 2006 Best Graduate Student Paper award from the African Studies Association, and her article "Dangerous Tales" won the 2012 Best Article award from the African Politics Conference Group. The same year, The Trouble with the Congo won the Grawemeyer Award for Ideas Improving World Order. The book also won the 2011 Chadwick Alger Prize awarded by the International Studies Association. It was the topic of a TED talk with more than 825,000 views.

Autesserre's work Peaceland won the 2016 Best Book of the Year Award and the 2015 Yale H. Ferguson Award from the International Studies Association, as well as honorable mentions for the 2014 African Argument Book of the Year, the 2015 Chadwick Alger Prize from the International Studies Association, and the 2015 Conflict Research Society Book of the Year.

In April 2021, Autesserre presented The Frontlines of Peace to the United Nations Security Council. Her book has received positive reviews from The Washington Post, The New York Times, and Le Soir, as well as a recommendation from Gideon Rachman of the Financial Times who listed the book as part of his "Summer Books of 2021." It is one of the finalists for the 2022 best book prize from the Conflict Research Society.

In 2021, Autesserre was named Knight of the Order of Academic Palms by the French government. That same year, she was awarded the Victor Sidel and Barry Levy Award for Peace from the American Public Health Association in recognition of her contributions to preventing war and promoting international peace. Her research has won her an Emerging Scholar Award from the International Studies Association (2021), a Special Prize of the Jury from the French Red Cross Fund (2017), an Andrew Carnegie Fellowship (2016), a 2016 Foreign Policy Interrupted fellowship, a research award from the United States Institute of Peace, two Harry Frank Guggenheim Foundation research grants (2010 and 2011), two Presidential Research Awards and an endowed chair position from Barnard College (2010, 2021, and 2024), two Mellon Fellowships in Security and Humanitarian Action (2004–06), and a Fulbright Fellowship (1999–2000).

Autesserre is one of the seven main characters in Timothy Pachirat's book Among Wolves.
