= Richard Fontaine =

American international relations scholar

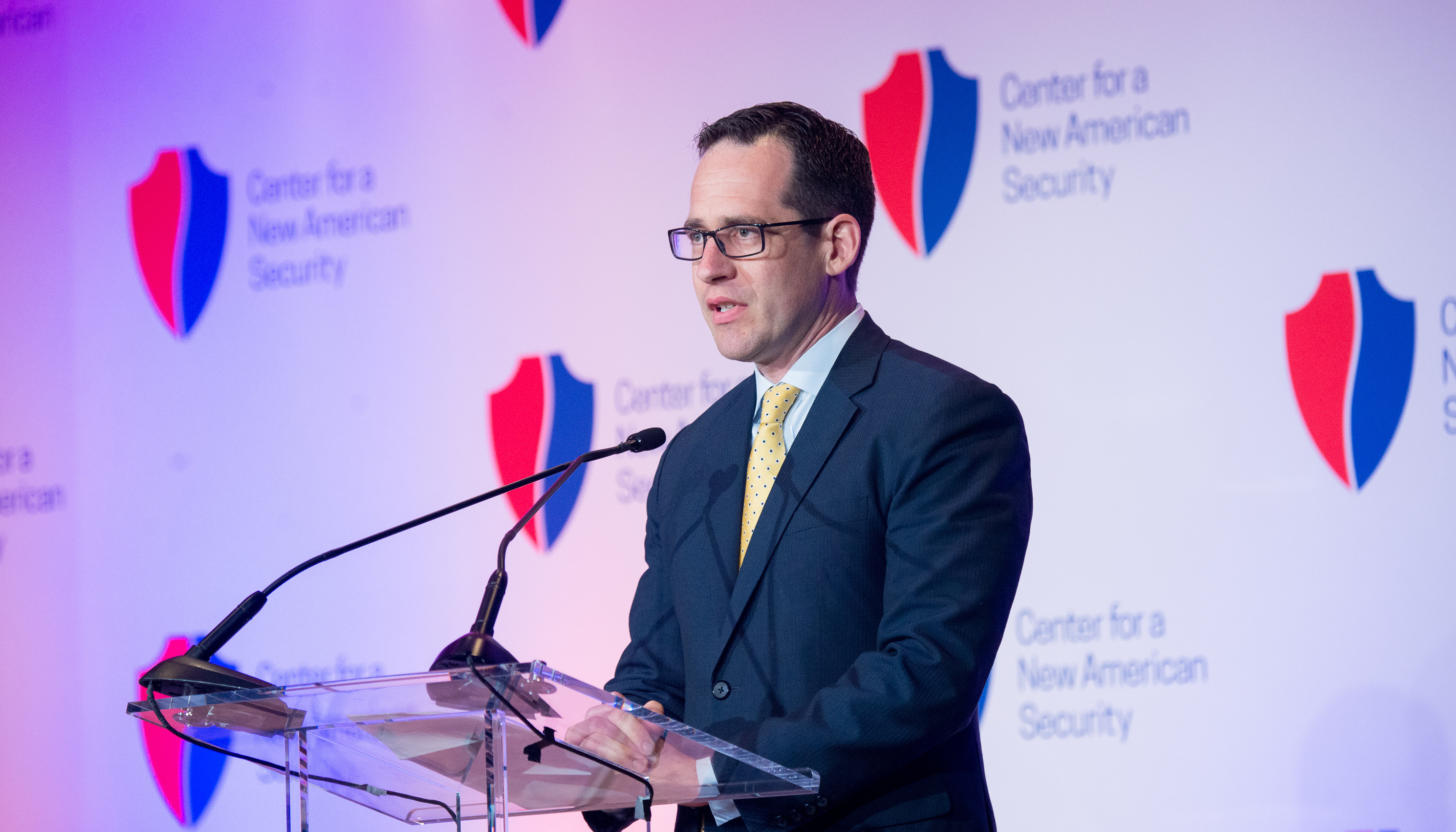
- Education: Tulane University (BA); Johns Hopkins University (MA)
- Occupation: Foreign policy analyst
- Employer: Center for a New American Security
- Spouse: Karen Fontaine
- Children: 4

Richard Fontaine is an American foreign policy analyst, CEO of the Center for a New American Security (CNAS).

== Education ==
Born in New Orleans, Fontaine holds a BA in international relations from Tulane University and an MA in international affairs from Johns Hopkins University SAIS.

== Career ==
Fontaine started his foreign policy career as a staff member focusing on the Middle East and South Asia at the Senate Foreign Relations Committee. Between 2003 and 2004, he was the associate director for Near Eastern Affairs at the White House National Security Council during the George W. Bush administration.

Fontaine was a foreign policy advisor to the John McCain 2008 presidential campaign from 2004 to 2008 and later became the Senate Armed Services Committee's minority deputy staff director.

He was appointed a senior fellow and senior advisor at CNAS in 2009 and became president in 2012, succeeding John Nagl. In 2019, he was named CNAS' CEO, succeeding Victoria Nuland.

Fontaine was also an adjunct professor at Georgetown SFS' security studies program.

He is a member of the Defense Policy Board Advisory Committee.

In 2024 Fontaine released "Lost Decade: The U.S. Pivot to Asia and the Rise of Chinese Power" with his co-author Robert D. Blackwill.

In June 2025, Fontaine was appointed a member of Anthropic's Long-Term Benefit Trust, the company's independent governance structure.
