= Rebecca Friedman Lissner =

American scientist and analyst

- Education: Harvard College (AB), Georgetown University (MA, PhD)
- Occupations: Political Scientist, Deputy National Security Advisor, Office of Vice President Kamala Harris (2022-2025)
- Employer: Council on Foreign Relations
- Political party: Democratic
- Spouse: Samuel Lissner

Rebecca Lissner (born 1987) is an American political scientist and foreign policy analyst who is a senior fellow for U.S. foreign policy and Director of the Future of American Strategy Initiative at the Council on Foreign Relations. She served as Deputy National Security Adviser to Vice President Kamala Harris from 2022 to 2025, including representing the vice president in the Principals Committee and Deputies Committee.

== Education ==
Lissner holds a BA (magna cum laude) in social studies from Harvard University and a MA and PhD in government from Georgetown University.

== Career ==
Lissner was previously on the faculty of the Center for Naval Warfare Studies at the Naval War College. Prior to that, she held a number of research fellowships and teaching positions, including at Yale University, the University of Pennsylvania, and the Council on Foreign Relations.

During the Obama administration, Lissner served as Special Advisor to Deputy Secretary of Energy, Elizabeth Sherwood-Randall. She then advised Hillary Clinton's campaign and presidential transition team during the 2016 election, and served as a foreign policy advisor to the Biden 2020 campaign.

During the Biden administration, Lissner was the Acting Senior Director for Strategic Planning on the National Security Council, where she oversaw the creation of the Biden administration's National Security Strategy and directed the Russia Strategy Group, as well as led the Russia-Ukraine "Tiger Team" planning process. In April 2022, Lissner left the National Security Council to join Harris's team as a deputy national security advisor.

Lissner returned to the Council on Foreign Relations as a Senior Fellow in 2025. In May 2026, she was named as the director of CFR's Future of American Strategy Initiative.

== Personal life ==
Lissner's husband, Samuel Lissner, is a principal at Ridgewood Infrastructure, a private equity firm specializing in water, energy transition, utilities, and transportation infrastructure investments. He is also a managing partner at Ridgewood Energy, a private equity firm focused on oil and gas investments in the U.S. deepwater Gulf of Mexico.

== Publications ==
Lissner has published articles in Foreign Affairs, The Washington Post, Foreign Policy, The New York Times, and The Atlantic.

She has also authored two books:

- Wars of Revelation: The Transformative Effects of Military Intervention on Grand Strategy (Oxford University Press, January 2022).
- An Open World: How America Can Win the Contest for 21st Century Order, with Mira Rapp-Hooper (Yale University Press, September 2020).
