= Desirée Cormier Smith =

American diplomat

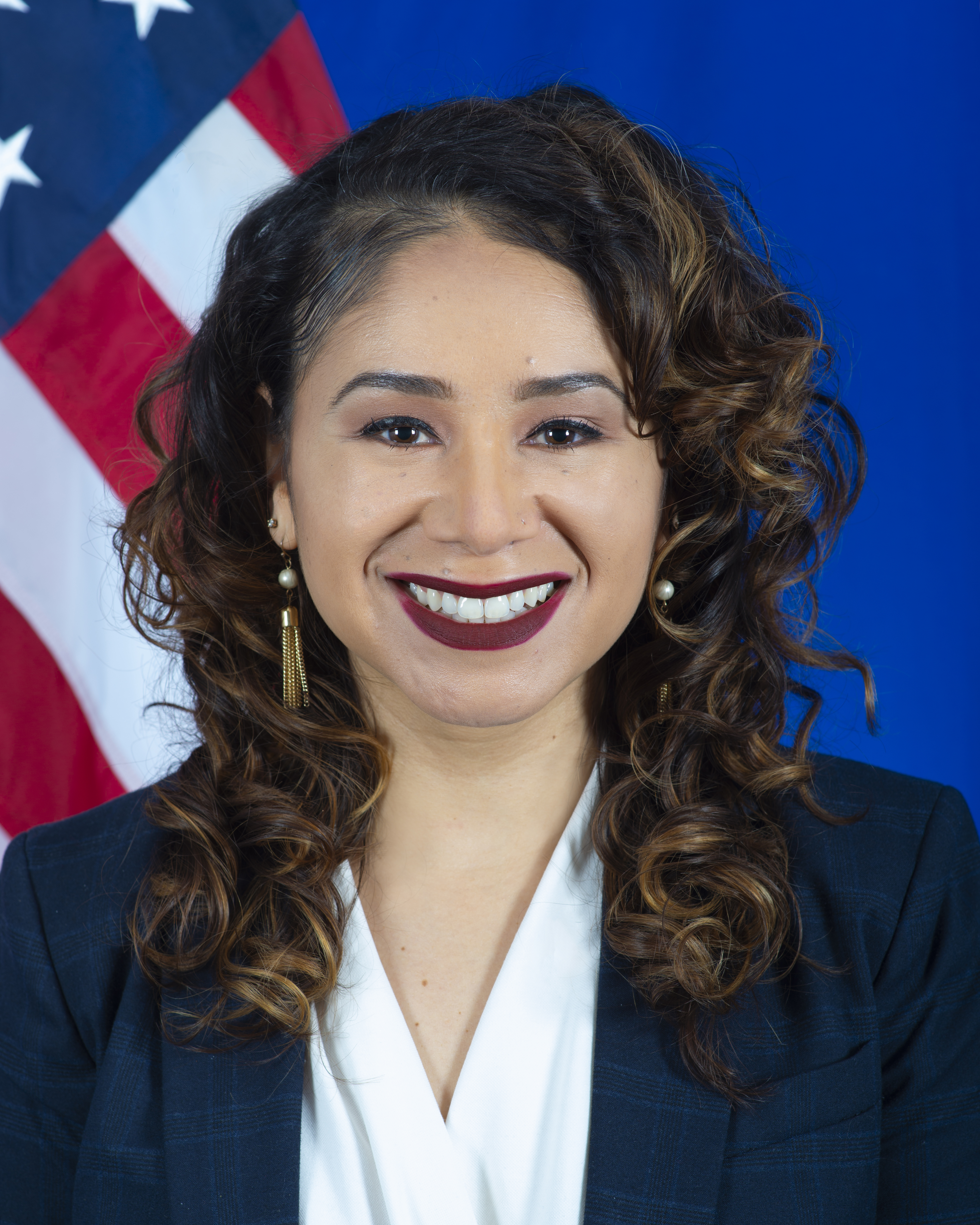

Special Representative for Racial Equity and Justice
- In office June 17, 2022 – January 20, 2025
- President: Joe Biden
- Preceded by: Position established
- Succeeded by: Vacant

Personal details
- Education: Stanford University (BA); Harvard Kennedy School (MPP)
- Profession: Diplomat, foreign policy analyst

Desirée Cormier Smith is an American diplomat who served as Special Representative for Racial Equity and Justice for the United States State Department from June 17, 2022 to January 20, 2025.

== Education ==
Cormier Smith graduated from Stanford University with a Bachelor of Arts degree in political science and psychology and from Harvard Kennedy School with a Master of Public Policy.

== Diplomatic career ==
From 2010 to 2012, Cormier Smith was posted in the travel visa office of the US consulate in Tijuana. She claimed to have experienced racial discrimination, from both applicants and Customs and Border Protection officers who questioned her identity and position. She served additional Foreign Service assignments in South Africa and Washington, D.C. From 2015 to 2020, Cormier Smith was the senior director of the Africa Practice at Albright Stonebridge Group.

=== Special Representative for Racial Equity and Justice ===
Cormier Smith was the first person appointed to the office, tasked with combating systemic racism around the world. She was part of the US delegation which signed a pledge to advance racial equity with Canada and Mexico at the 2023 North American Leaders' Summit. In February 2023, Cormier Smith held talks with Brazilian Minister of Racial Equality Anielle Franco, who sought re-implementation of the two countries' Joint Action Plan to Eliminate Racial and Ethnic Discriminatrion (JAPER) following a petition by 10 Afro-Brazilian organizations. In April 2024, she represented the United States at the third session of the United Nations Permanent Forum on People of African Descent. In September 15, 2025, Cormier Smith said "it was a difficult decision to not resign" in protest over Gaza.

== Personal life ==
In July 2021, Cormier Smith was a bridesmaid at the French Riviera wedding of her friend, the actress Issa Rae, and businessman Louis Diame.
