= Center for European Studies at Science Po =

French research center

Center for European Studies at Sciences Po
- Established: 2005
- Director: Renaud Dehousse
- Location: Paris, France
- Affiliations: Fondation nationale des sciences politiques

The Center for European Studies at Sciences Po is one of the nine research centres at the IEP de Paris. It was founded by Renaud Dehousse who also served as its director.
