= The European Legacy =

- Discipline: European studies
- Language: English, French
- Edited by: Yaniv Reingewertz

Publication details
- History: 1996–present
- Publisher: Routledge
- Frequency: 7/year

Standard abbreviations
- ISO 4: Eur. Leg.

Indexing
- ISSN: 1084-8770 (print); 1470-1316 (web)
- LCCN: 96649905
- OCLC no.: 33200598

Links
- Journal homepage; Online access; Online archive

The European Legacy is a peer-reviewed academic journal covering the study of European intellectual and cultural history. It was established in 1996 and is published seven times per year by Routledge. The editors-in-chief were Ezra Talmor, David W. Lovell, and Edna Rosenthal. As of 2026, the journal's editor is Yaniv Reingewertz.
