= Kurt M. Campbell =

American diplomat and businessman (born 1957)

Kurt Campbell
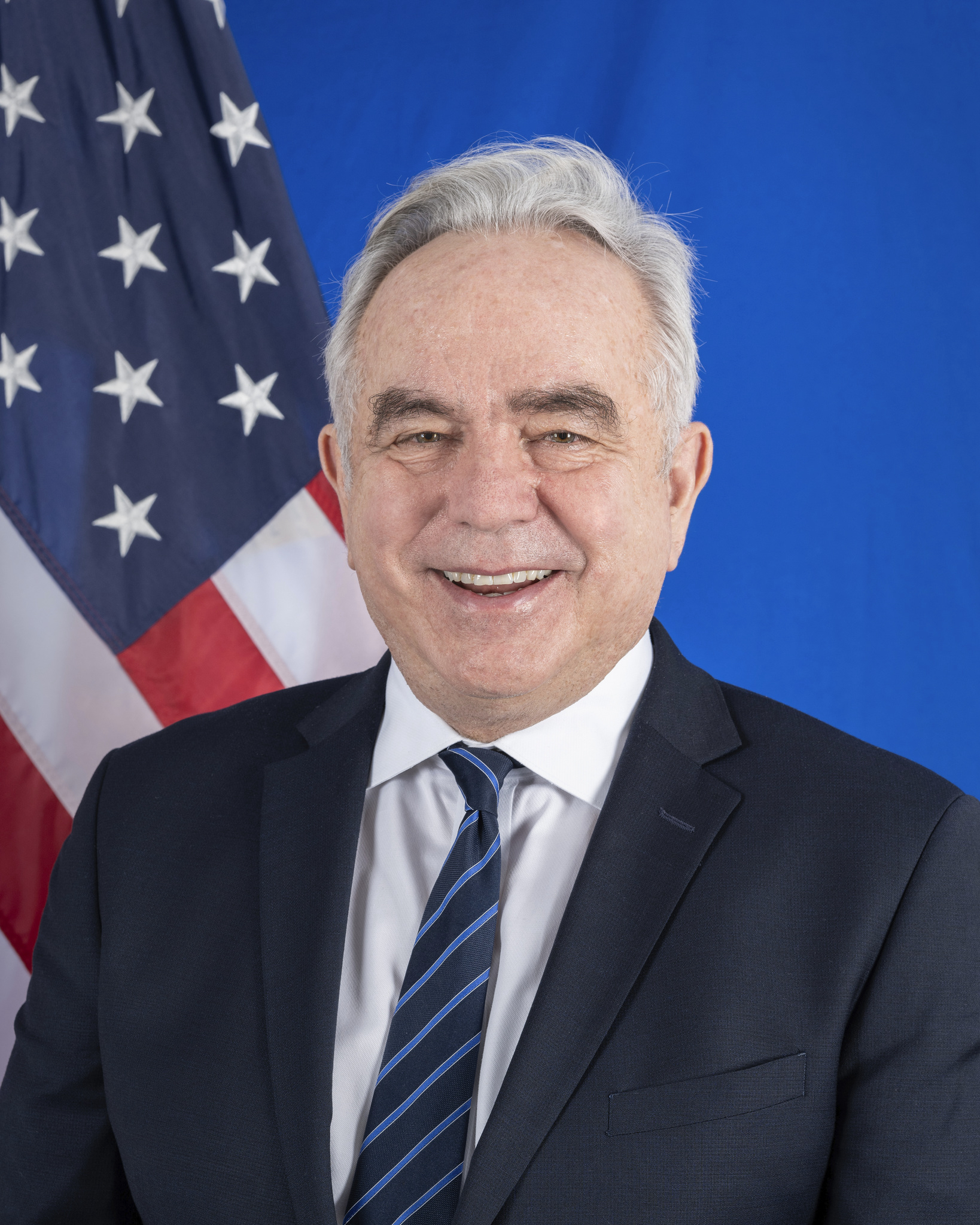
- Official portrait, 2024

22nd United States Deputy Secretary of State
- In office February 12, 2024 – January 20, 2025
- President: Joe Biden
- Secretary: Antony Blinken
- Preceded by: Wendy Sherman; Victoria Nuland (acting)
- Succeeded by: Christopher Landau

National Security Council Coordinator for the Indo-Pacific
- In office January 20, 2021 – February 12, 2024
- President: Joe Biden
- Preceded by: Position established
- Succeeded by: Position abolished

24th Assistant Secretary of State for East Asian and Pacific Affairs
- In office June 29, 2009 – February 8, 2013
- President: Barack Obama
- Preceded by: Christopher R. Hill
- Succeeded by: Daniel R. Russel

Personal details
- Born: Kurt Michael Campbell; August 27, 1957 (age 69) Fresno, California, U.S.
- Party: Democratic
- Spouse: Lael Brainard (m. 1998)
- Education: University of California, San Diego (BA); Brasenose College, Oxford (DPhil)

Kurt Michael Campbell (born August 27, 1957) is an American diplomat and businessman who served as the United States deputy secretary of state from 2024 to 2025. He previously served as deputy assistant advisor to President Biden and National Security Council coordinator for the Indo-Pacific from 2021 to 2024. In this capacity, Campbell had been referred to as the Biden administration's "Asia coordinator" or "Asia czar"—chief architect of Joe Biden's Asia strategy.

He formerly served as assistant secretary of state for East Asian and Pacific affairs in the Obama administration. He was the chairman and CEO of The Asia Group, which he founded in February 2013. On January 20, 2021, he was appointed as the NSC Coordinator for the Indo-Pacific by Joe Biden.

== Education ==
Kurt Michael Campbell was born on August 27, 1957. He completed a BA at the University of California, San Diego, a certificate in music and political philosophy at the University of Yerevan in Soviet Armenia, and a PhD (international relations at Brasenose College, Oxford, on a Marshall Scholarship.

== Career ==
Campbell served in several capacities in government, including as deputy assistant secretary of defense for Asia and the Pacific, director on the National Security Council Staff, deputy special counselor to the president for the North American Free Trade Agreement (NAFTA), and as a White House Fellow at the United States Department of the Treasury.

Campbell served as an officer in the U.S. Navy on the Joint Chiefs of Staff and in the Chief of Naval Operations Special Intelligence Unit. He was also associate professor of public policy and international relations at the John F. Kennedy School of Government and assistant director of the Center for Science and International Affairs at Harvard University.

In 2000, Campbell was hired at the Center for Strategic and International Studies as one of its senior vice-presidents, as director of its International Security Program, and as its Henry A. Kissinger Chair in National Security Policy.

Campbell went on to become the CEO and co-founder of the Center for a New American Security.

=== Obama administration ===
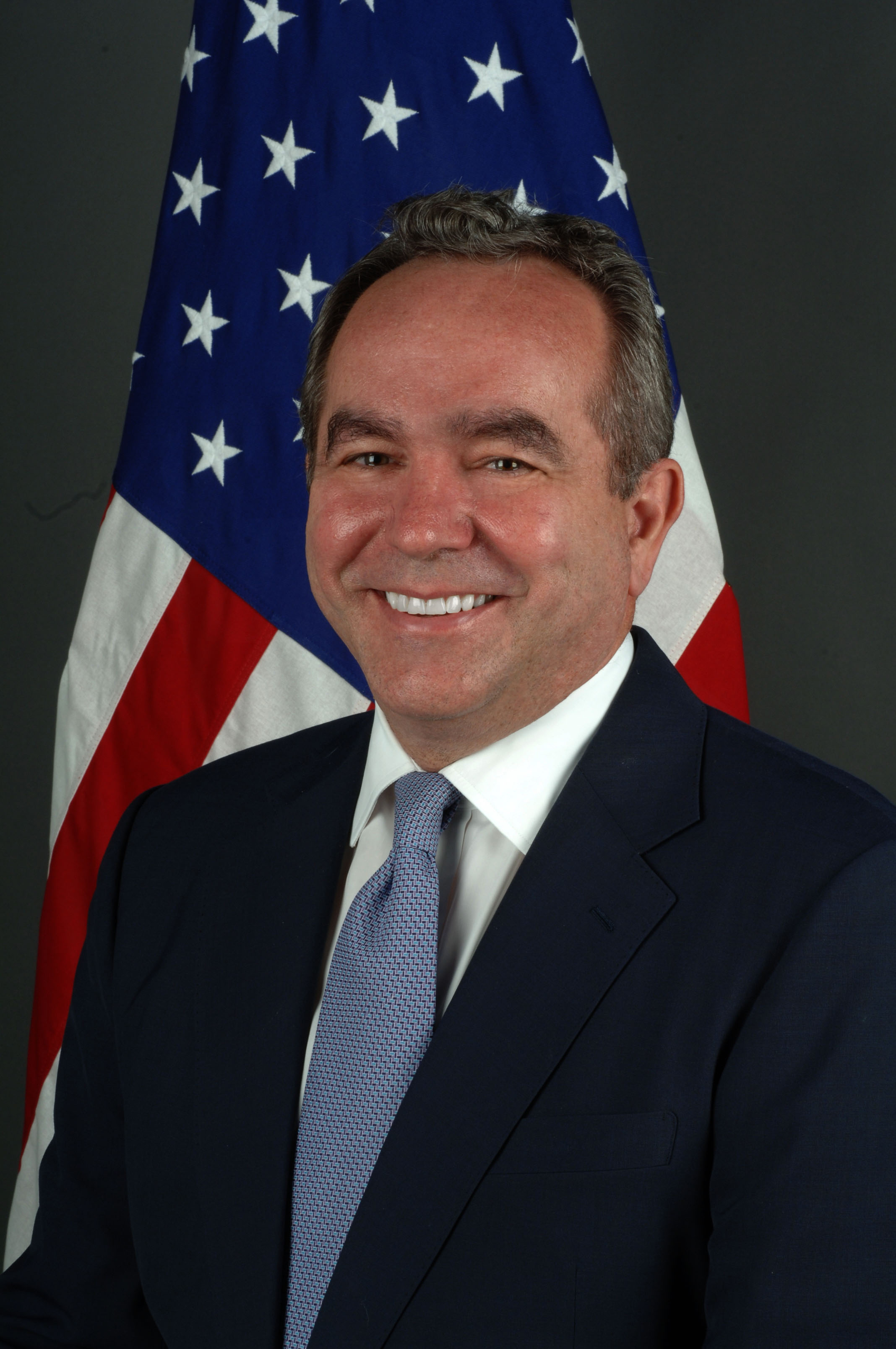
Campbell in 2009

On June 26, 2009, Campbell was appointed by the Obama administration as assistant secretary of state for East Asian and Pacific affairs which he continued in until February 8, 2013.

=== Outside of government ===
Campbell also served as director of the Aspen Strategy Group and the chairman of the editorial board of the Washington Quarterly. He was the founder and principal of StratAsia, a consulting firm focused on small-to-medium businesses in Asia, and a 2013 co-founder and chair of The Asia Group, a strategic advisory firm also focused on the Asia-Pacific region.

Campbell was a member of the Council on Foreign Relations, the Wasatch Group, and the International Institute for Strategic Studies.

In 2018–2019, Campbell was Kissinger Fellow at the McCain Institute.

=== Biden administration ===
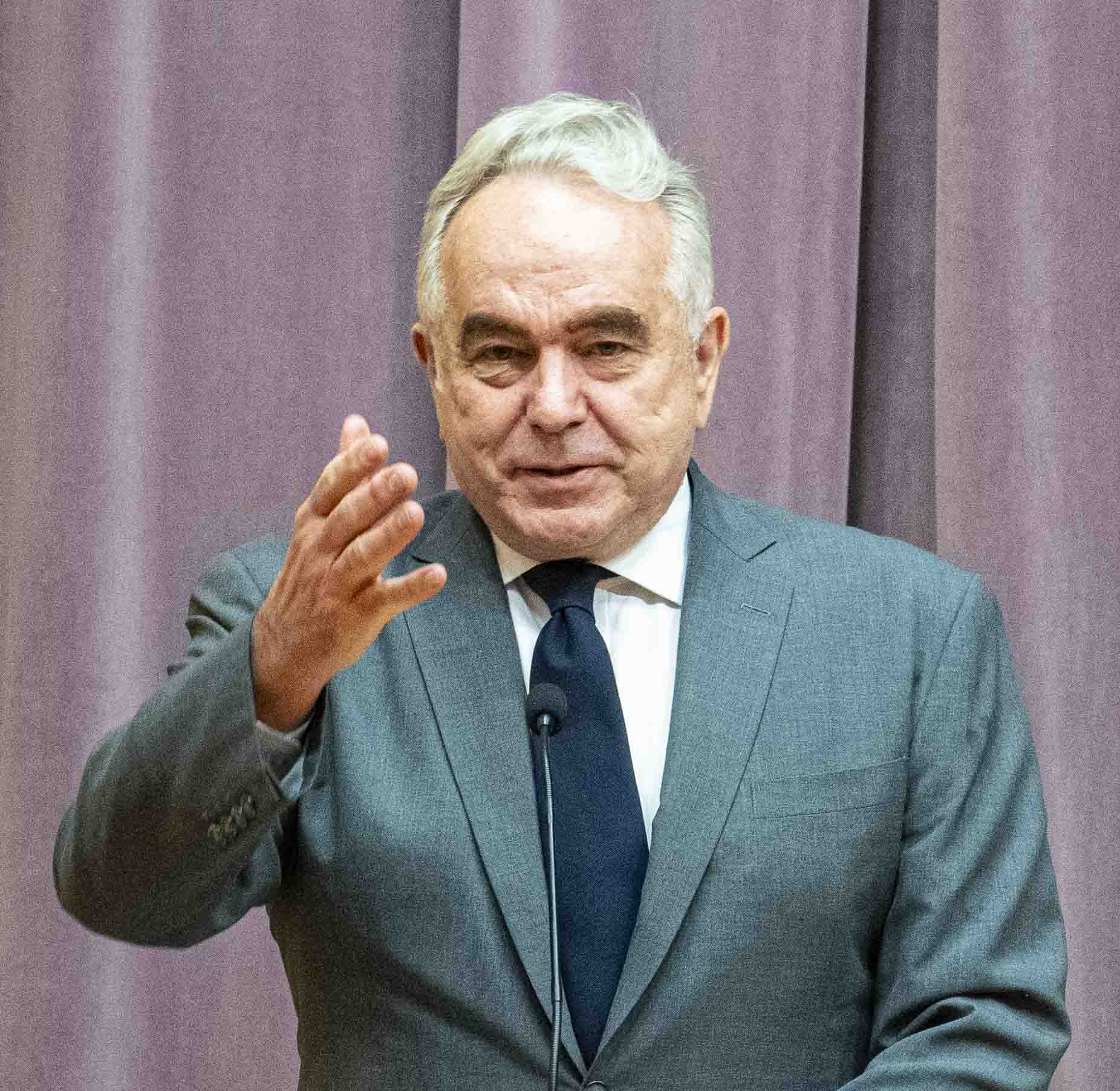
Campbell speaks in 2024

Campbell was appointed as the National Security coordinator for the Indo-Pacific on January 20, 2021, the first day of President Joe Biden's administration. In that role, he traveled to Japan several times and the Solomon Islands. His staff included Dr. Rush Doshi and Sarah Donilon. He has been referred to as the Biden administration's "Asia coordinator" or "Asia czar."

On November 1, 2023, Campbell was nominated by President Biden to become the United States deputy secretary of state, and his nomination was sent to the United States Senate the same day. His nomination was confirmed by a 92–5 vote on February 6, 2024. He was sworn in on February 12, 2024. The Biden administration did not plan to nominate a replacement for Campbell as the Indo-Pacific coordinator. A White House spokesperson shared that the role had been created specifically for Campbell and was not a permanent post.

=== Post-Biden administration ===
Campbell rejoined The Asia Group as chairman and co-founder in February 2025. He was appointed a distinguished fellow in diplomacy at Georgetown University's Walsh School of Foreign Service in March 2025.

== Publications ==
=== As author ===
- The China Reckoning: How Beijing Defied American Expectations, Foreign Affairs, April 2018 (co-authored with Ely Ratner)
- The Pivot: The Future of American Statecraft in Asia, Kurt M. Campbell, (NYC: Twelve, 2016) ISBN 978-1455568956
- Difficult Transitions: Foreign Policy Troubles at the Outset of Presidential Power, Kurt M. Campbell and James Steinberg, (Washington, D.C.: Brookings, 2008)
- Hard Power: The New Politics of National Security, Kurt M. Campbell and Michael E. O'Hanlon, (Washington, D.C.: Basic Books, 2006)
- To Prevail: An American Strategy for the Campaign against Terrorism, Kurt M. Campbell and Michèle Flournoy, Principal Authors, Center for Strategic and International Studies (Washington, D.C.: CSIS Press, 2001)

=== As editor ===
- Campbell, Kurt M., ed. (2008). Climatic Cataclysm: The Foreign Policy and National Security Implications of Climate Change. Brookings Institution Press. Mentioned in Is this what the World is Coming to? (Nature.com)
- The Nuclear Tipping Point, Kurt M. Campbell, Robert J. Einhorn, Mitchell Reiss, eds., (Washington, D.C.: Brookings, 2004)

=== As opinionist ===
- At the outset of his influence on the Biden administration, he saw the D10 club of countries as "most urgent for questions of trade, technology, supply chains, and standards", and militarily sought to expand "the so-called Quad".

== Honors and awards ==
Campbell received the Department of Defense Medals for Distinguished Public Service and for Outstanding Public Service.

Campbell co-chaired the executive committee of the 9-11 Pentagon Memorial Fund.

On 25 November 2013, Campbell was appointed an Honorary Officer of the Order of Australia (AO) for "service to strengthening bilateral relations between Australia and the United States of America". In the 2014 New Year Honours, Campbell was appointed an honorary Companion of the New Zealand Order of Merit for services to New Zealand-United States relations. On 15 October 2013, Campbell was appointed Order of Brilliant Star with Special Grand Cordon for services to Taiwan–United States relations.

Political offices
Preceded by Christopher R. Hill	Assistant Secretary of State for East Asian and Pacific Affairs; 2009–2013	Succeeded by Daniel R. Russel
Preceded by Victoria Nuland; Acting	United States Deputy Secretary of State; 2024–2025	Succeeded by Christopher Landau
