= Mira Rapp-Hooper =

American political scientist

- Education: Stanford University (BA); Columbia University (MA, MPhil, PhD)
- Occupations: Political scientist; senior U.S. security official
- Employer: U.S. National Security Council
- Notable work: Shields of the Republic: The Triumph and Peril of America's Alliances (2020)

Mira Rapp-Hooper (born 1984) is an American political scientist who served as Special Assistant to the President and Senior Director for East Asia and Oceania at the White House National Security Council (NSC) in the Biden administration. She was the White House's top advisor for and responsible for coordinating US government policy towards the region. From 2021–2023 she served as Director for Indo-Pacific Strategy at the NSC where she was responsible for the White House's Indo-Pacific Strategy, the management of the Quad partnership among Australia, India, Japan, and the United States, and US-Japan-ROK trilateral relations, among other initiatives. In 2021 she briefly served at the State Department on the Secretary's Policy Planning Staff.

== Education ==
She holds a B.A. in history from Stanford University and an M.A., M.Phil., and Ph.D. in political science from Columbia University. At Columbia she was research assistant to Kenneth Waltz, the founder of structural realism, and had Robert Jervis, Virginia Page Fortna, Richard K. Betts, and Andrew J. Nathan as advisors. Her dissertation was titled, "Absolute Alliances : Extended Deterrence in International Politics."

== Career ==
Before joining the Biden administration, she worked at the Center for a New American Security (CNAS) as a senior fellow in the Asia-Pacific Security Program, and at the Center for Strategic and International Studies (CSIS) as a fellow and as director of CSIS' Asia Maritime Transparency Initiative.

Rapp-Hooper was also Asia Policy Coordinator for the 2016 Hillary Clinton campaign. She was a Foreign Policy Interrupted Fellow, and is a David Rockefeller Fellow of the Trilateral Commission and an Associate Editor with the International Security Studies Forum. Her 2021 appointment to the Department of State was seen as part of the Biden administration's pivot to the Indo-Pacific.

She has published in Political Science Quarterly, Security Studies, and Survival (academic); the National Interest, Foreign Affairs, and The Washington Quarterly (press). She is a regular journalistic source on Asia issues and has provided expert analysis to the New York Times, The Washington Post, and NPR and the BBC. Her book Shields of the Republic: The Triumph and Peril of America's Alliances (Harvard University Press, 2020) analyzes the history of and the challenges to the United States' system of alliances. Her second book, An Open World: How America Can Win the Contest for Twenty-First-Century Order, co-authored with Rebecca Lissner, was published in December 2020 by Yale University Press.

== Publications ==
- "Saving America's Alliances", Foreign Affairs, March/April 2020 issue
- "Nuclear Stability on the Korean Peninsula", Survival, Volume 62, 2020, Issue 1 (with Adam Mount)
- "Presidential Alliance Powers", The Washington Quarterly, Volume 42, 2019, Issue 2 (with Matthew C. Waxman)
- "The Open World", Foreign Affairs, May/June 2019 issue (with Rebecca Friedman Lissner)
- "Mapping China's Health Silk Road", Council on Foreign Relations Asia Unbound blog, April 10, 2020 (with Kirk Lancaster and Michael Rubin)
