= Mark W. Lippert =

American diplomat (born 1973)

Mark Lippert
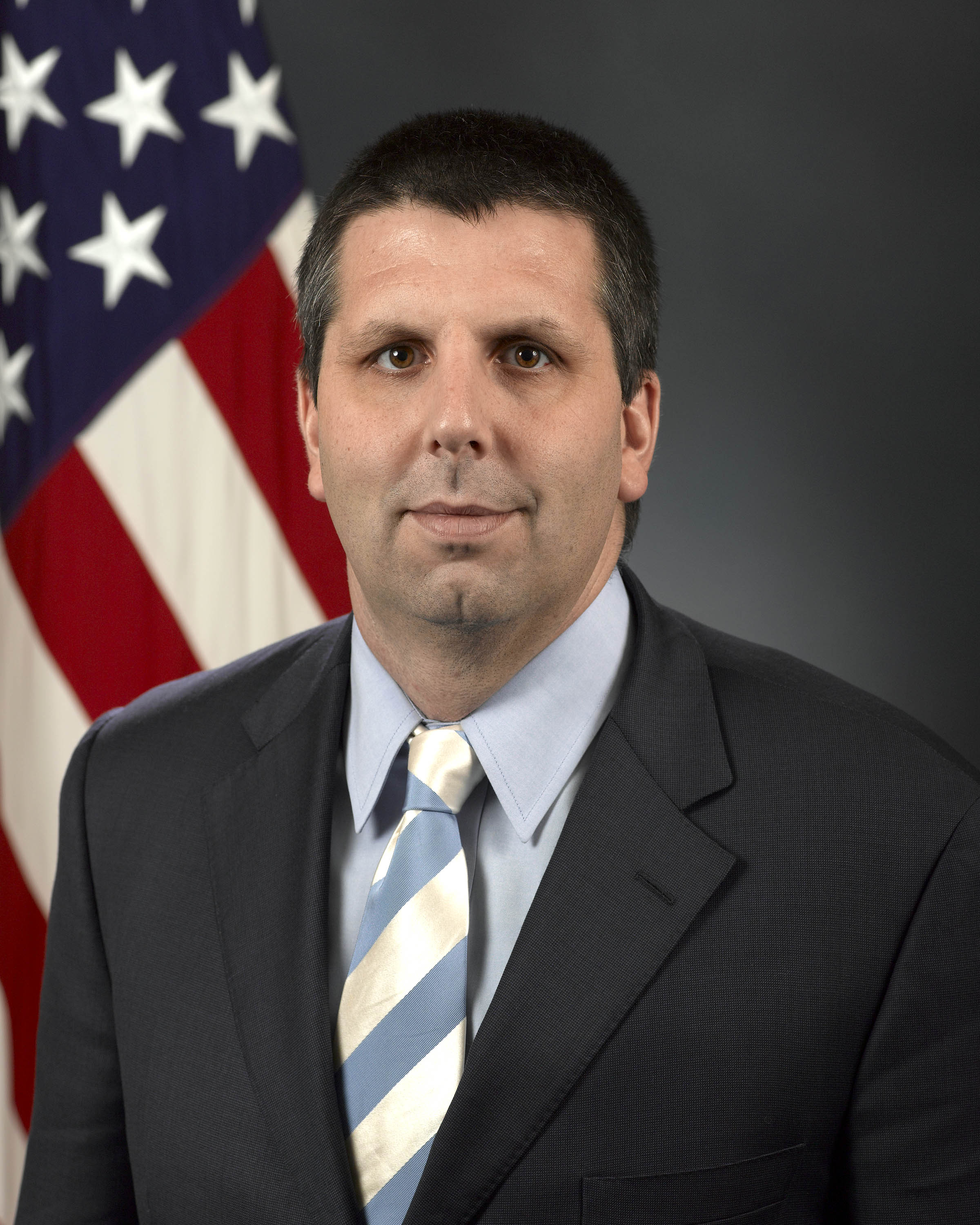

22nd United States Ambassador to South Korea
- In office November 21, 2014 – January 20, 2017
- President: Barack Obama
- Preceded by: Sung Kim
- Succeeded by: Harry B. Harris Jr.

Chief of Staff to the Secretary of Defense
- In office May 2013 – October 2014
- President: Barack Obama
- Secretary: Chuck Hagel
- Preceded by: Jeremy Bash
- Succeeded by: Eric Fanning

Assistant Secretary of Defense for Asian and Pacific Security Affairs
- In office May 9, 2012 – April 24, 2013
- President: Barack Obama
- Preceded by: Chip Gregson
- Succeeded by: David B. Shear

Chief of Staff of the National Security Council
- In office January 2009 – October 2009
- President: Barack Obama
- Leader: James Jones
- Succeeded by: Denis McDonough

Personal details
- Born: Mark William Lippert; February 28, 1973 (age 53) Cincinnati, Ohio, U.S.
- Party: Democratic
- Spouse: Robyn Lippert
- Education: Stanford University (BA, MA)

Military service
- Allegiance: United States
- Branch/service: United States Navy
- Years of service: 2005–2011
- Rank: Lieutenant
- Unit: U.S. Navy Reserve
- Battles/wars: Iraq War; Operation Iraqi Freedom
- Awards: Bronze Star Medal; National Defense Service Medal; Iraq Campaign Medal w/ campaign star Global War on Terrorism Service Medal

Mark William Lippert (born February 28, 1973) is an American diplomat who worked as the vice president for international affairs at Boeing from 2017 to 2020. In 2022, he was appointed Executive Vice President of Samsung Electronics America. He previously served as the United States Ambassador to South Korea from 2014 to 2017. Prior to his tour as an ambassador, Lippert had served as Chief of Staff for Secretary of Defense Chuck Hagel, Chief of Staff for the National Security Council, and Assistant Secretary of Defense for Asian and Pacific Security Affairs in the Department of Defense. On March 5, 2015, he was attacked by a man wielding a knife in South Korea.

== Early life and education ==
Lippert was born in and grew up in Mariemont, Ohio, a suburb just outside Cincinnati. He is the son of Susan (Bridges) and James William Lippert, a lawyer. Lippert graduated from Stanford University where he studied political science as an undergraduate and received a master's degree in international policy studies. While in graduate school at Stanford, he studied Mandarin Chinese at Peking University as part of a study abroad program. As a result, Lippert is known in Mandarin as Lee Mokai (Chinese: 李模楷), the Chinese name he chose for himself during his stay in Beijing.

== Career ==
Prior to 1999, he worked at the State Department and for California Senator Dianne Feinstein. Lippert was a defense and foreign policy advisor to then Senator and Senate Minority Leader Tom Daschle and the Senate Democratic Policy Committee from 1999 to October 2000. He then served as a researcher for Senator Patrick Leahy from October 2000 to February 2001. Lippert served on the professional staff of the Senate Appropriations Committee, State–Foreign Operations Subcommittee, from February 2001 to June 2005. In June 2005, he became a foreign policy advisor to then Senator Barack Obama, who was then serving on the Senate Foreign Relations committee. He was recruited by Senator Obama's Chief of Staff, Pete Rouse, who served as Counselor to the President through 2013.

Lippert was also commissioned into the Navy Reserve in 2005 through the Navy's direct commission officer program as an intelligence officer. From August 2007 until June 2008, he served about a year in what had been scheduled as a nine-month tour of duty in Iraq as an intelligence officer with the Navy SEALs. He received a Bronze Star Medal for his service in Iraq.

After he returned from Iraq, Lippert served as a senior foreign policy advisor to then-Senator Obama's 2008 presidential campaign. He was responsible for briefing Obama on emerging foreign policy issues throughout the campaign. He helped prepare Obama on foreign policy for the presidential debates. Lippert later served as deputy director for foreign policy for the Obama–Biden Transition Project.

Throughout his time in the Senate and during the presidential campaign, Lippert was noted for having a close relationship with then Senator Obama. He is credited for helping Obama develop his views on defense and foreign policy, particularly his support for a withdrawal of American troops from Iraq, which was completed under President Obama in December 2011 as well as Obama's emphasis on transnational security issues, such as genocide and weapons of mass destruction.

=== Obama administration ===
Following Obama's inauguration in January 2009, he was appointed Deputy Assistant to the President and Chief of Staff for the National Security Council, a position which had not existed in the Bush administration, but had existed in previous administrations. During his time as chief of staff, Lippert oversaw the merger of the staffs of the Homeland Security Council, which had been created in October 2001 by President Bush, and the National Security Council, into a single National Security Staff. Unlike his recent predecessors, then-National Security Advisor General Jim Jones delegated much of the day-to-day responsibilities for the National Security Council to his deputy, Tom Donilon, and to a couple of Obama campaign veterans, including Denis McDonough and Mark Lippert.

In October 2009, Lippert resigned from the National Security Council to return to active duty in the Navy. There was speculation surrounding Lippert's resignation that he was pushed to leave due to significant disagreements with General Jones, especially with respect to the troop surge. Jones accused Lippert of leaking information about him to Bob Woodward for Obama's Wars. Lippert was succeeded by Denis McDonough, who would go on to later serve as Deputy National Security Advisor, then White House Chief of Staff. Lippert had originally recruited McDonough to serve as then-Senator Obama's foreign policy advisor during his 2007 deployment to Iraq.

Lippert spent two years serving as an intelligence officer with the Navy SEALs. He remained on the White House payroll while on active duty, which is permitted by federal law, but caused some controversy.

After completing his active duty with the Navy, Lippert was nominated by President Obama in October 2011 to succeed General Wallace "Chip" Gregson as Assistant Secretary of Defense for Asian and Pacific Security Affairs. While Lippert's nomination was held up for several months due to holds placed on it by Senators John McCain and John Cornyn over Lippert's relationship with former National Security Advisor Jim Jones, and over F-16 sales to Taiwan, respectively, he was confirmed by the Senate in a voice vote in April 2012. Among Lippert's most important accomplishments was building defense relations with friends, partners, and allies in the region. Stars and Stripes reported that Lippert "played a key role in DOD's push to deepen defense ties with Asian nations as the Pentagon implements a new strategy aimed at building U.S. influence in Asia ... and has transformed our relationship in the Pacific."

When Kurt Campbell resigned as Assistant Secretary of State for East Asian and Pacific Affairs in February 2013, Lippert was rumoured as a possible replacement for Campbell. Lippert was named newly confirmed Secretary of Defense Chuck Hagel's Chief of Staff in early May 2013.

=== Ambassador to South Korea ===
On May 1, 2014, President Obama announced his intention to nominate Lippert to be United States Ambassador to South Korea. The United States Senate voted to confirm Lippert's nomination on September 18, 2014. He was sworn in as the new ambassador by Secretary of State John Kerry in October 2014. At 41, Lippert became the youngest Ambassador in the history of the relationship. Yonhap reported that at the ceremony, U.S. President Barack Obama made a "surprise appearance ... in a show of his closeness and friendship with the new envoy." At the end of his term Michael Green called Lippert "the best U.S. envoy to date" in an opinion piece for the JoongAng Daily

His tenure in Seoul was widely praised in the U.S. and in Korea. Foreign Minister of the Republic of Korea called Lippert the best ever U.S. Ambassador to Korea stating "You left an indelible mark in the history of the U.S.–Korea alliance. ... Our alliance relationship is the best it has ever been and you are the best ever American ambassador I have ever seen." The top Asia advisor in the George W. Bush White House stated "Ambassador Mark Lippert leaves Seoul as the most popular U.S. Ambassador in the history of U.S.–Korea relations. ... This reflects ... his effectiveness at advancing U.S. interests while simultaneously strengthening bonds between the two countries. ... Lippert enjoy[ed] near unanimous bipartisan support and admiration from Democrats and Republicans for the job he has done, according to Michael Green in an opinion piece published in JoongAng Daily "

==== Family In South Korea ====
In January 2015, Ambassador Lippert's wife Robyn Lippert gave birth to their first child, a boy, at Yonsei Severance Hospital in Seoul, becoming the first U.S. Ambassador with a child born on Korean soil. They gave their son a Korean name, James William Sejun Lippert. Sejun means "to become an exceptional person as a result of leading an honest and clean life." The Korean middle name was chosen after consulting with a Saju specialist—pertaining to the Four Pillars of Destiny which are the year, month, date, and hour of the birth that are believed to decide a person's destiny or faith. The couple used his Korean name as a primary name. In November 2016, the Lipperts had a daughter, Caroline Saehee, also given a Korean middle name by the Saju process meaning "clean and hopeful life". They used Saehee as her principal name.

==== Knife attack ====
At about 7:40 a.m. on March 5, 2015, Lippert was attacked by a knife-wielding man at a restaurant attached to Sejong Center in downtown Seoul, where he was scheduled to give a speech at a meeting of the Korean Council for Reconciliation and Cooperation. The assailant, Kim Ki-jong, is a member of Uri Madang, a progressive cultural organization opposed to the Korean War. He inflicted wounds on Lippert's left arm as well as a four-inch cut on the right side of the ambassador's face, requiring 80 stitches. Lippert underwent surgery at Yonsei University's Severance Hospital in Seoul. While his injuries were not life-threatening, doctors stated that it would take several months for Lippert to regain use of his fingers. A police official said that the knife used in the attack was 10 inches (25 cm) long and Lippert later reported that the blade penetrated to within 2 cm of his carotid artery. ABC News summarized the immediate aftermath of the attack as follows: "Ambassador Lippert, an Iraq war veteran, defended himself from the attack. Lippert was rushed to a hospital where he was treated for deep cuts to his face, his arm, and his hand. ... [He] kept his cool throughout the incident."

During the attack and while being subdued by security, Kim screamed that the rival Koreas should be unified and told reporters that he had attacked Lippert to protest the annual United States–South Korean joint military exercises. Kim has a record of militant Korean nationalist activism; he attacked the Japanese ambassador to South Korea in 2010 and was sentenced to a three-year suspended prison term. On September 11, 2015, Kim was sentenced to twelve years in prison for the attack.

Lippert was widely praised for his handling of the incident. Many commentators noted his cool and calm demeanor during the attack and his deft handling of public communications in the hours and days after. The leading Korean paper ran an editorial stating: "Kudos goes to the victim. ... [Lippert] remained calm even as he was rushed to the hospital. The scene left a deep impression on the public. ... It may not have been easy to keep a calm face with blood gushing down his neck, but Lippert did and assured the people around him that he was OK. As soon as he woke up from surgery, he wrote on his Twitter account that he was doing well. 'Let's go together,' he wrote in Korean." Historian Max Boot wrote "By all accounts Mark Lippert ... is an exemplary Ambassador. ... he has further enhanced his reputation with the sang-froid with which he handled a vicious attack. ... his example shows how diplomats, too, serve on the front lines and deserve respect for the risks they run and what they can accomplish to advance our country's interests."

=== Post-government career ===
Lippert was vice president for international affairs at Boeing beginning in 2017, and has served as executive vice president of Samsung Electronics America since 2020.

Political offices
Preceded by Chip Gregson	Assistant Secretary of Defense for Asian and Pacific Security Affairs; 2012–2013	Succeeded by Peter Lavoy
Preceded by Jeremy Bash	Chief of Staff to the Secretary of Defense; 2013–2014	Succeeded by Eric Fanning
Diplomatic posts
Preceded by Sung Kim	United States Ambassador to South Korea; 2014–2017	Succeeded by Harry Harris
