= Mitchell Shivers =

American diplomat

Mitchell Everett Shivers
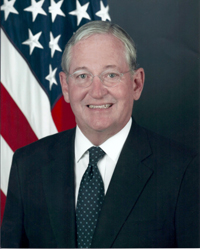

Assistant Secretary of Defense for Asian and Pacific Security Affairs
- In office November 14, 2008 – January 20, 2009
- President: George W. Bush
- Preceded by: James J. Shinn
- Succeeded by: Wallace Gregson

Personal details
- Born: November 19, 1947 (age 78) Brooklyn, New York, U.S.
- Spouse: Nancy Jane Shivers
- Education: Monmouth University

Military service
- Allegiance: United States

Mitchell Everett Shivers (born November 19, 1947) is an American diplomat, national security official, and investment banker. He is currently the non-executive Chair of BlueQuartz Technologies LLC, and is a governor-appointed member of the New Jersey State Investment Council.

== Early life ==
Born in Brooklyn, New York, Mr. Shivers received his B.S. degree from Monmouth University in 1970. He then entered the U.S. Marine Corps as an infantry Second Lieutenant, experiencing combat in Vietnam with the Navy aboard the guided missile cruiser USS Oklahoma City (CLG-5). He was Honorably Discharged as a captain.

== Career ==
After the Marines, he joined Merrill Lynch, attended New York University’s graduate school of business, and had a succession of senior responsibilities in investment banking in New York, Singapore, and Tokyo. In 1981, he joined Great Britain's third largest merchant bank, Samuel Montagu & Co., in London as deputy head of global capital markets, a member of its management committee and the bank's board of directors. In 1985, he joined Kleinwort Benson Ltd., then Britain's largest merchant bank, as head of its United States securities businesses based in New York and president of Kleinwort Benson Inc.

Upon the sale of a Kleinwort subsidiary to Japan's Fuji Bank, he joined Fuji as president and CEO of Fuji Government Securities Inc., a leading primary dealer in US government securities. In 1995 he returned to Merrill Lynch as a managing director and shortly thereafter was named president of Merrill's new joint venture merchant bank in Jakarta, Indonesia. After a short assignment in London in 1998 to head the firm's global preparations for the arrival of Europe's single currency, the Euro, he returned to New York as head of global public credit origination.

=== Department of Defense ===
In 2004 he was recruited by the U.S. Department of Defense to spend one year as a diplomat and senior advisor with the State Department's Afghanistan Reconstruction Group at US Embassy Kabul. For that assignment he was given a Presidential Award of Excellence by President Hamid Karzai. In 2006 he joined the Defense Department as a consultant in the Office of the Secretary of Defense. In 2007 Secretary Robert Gates appointed him Deputy Assistant Secretary of Defense for Central Asia.

In 2008 he was appointed Principal Deputy Assistant Secretary of Defense for Asian and Pacific Security Affairs and Acting Assistant Secretary of Defense, Asian and Pacific Security Affairs. Following his role in this capacity, Shivers has given his opinion on political matters, including on President Donald Trump's early days in office, his restraint, and his approach to foreign diplomacy in Asia.

== Awards ==
He has twice been awarded the Secretary of Defense Medal for Outstanding Public Service.
