= Countering America's Adversaries Through Sanctions Act =

2017 U.S. law sanctioning Iran, North Korea and Russia

- Long title: An Act to provide congressional review and to counter aggression by the Governments of Iran, the Russian Federation, and North Korea, and for other purposes.
- Acronyms (colloquial): CAATSA
- Enacted by: the 115th United States Congress

Citations
- Public law: Pub. L. 115–44 (text) (PDF)

Legislative history
- Introduced in the House as H.R. 3364 by Edward Royce (R–CA) on July 24, 2017; Committee consideration by Foreign Affairs, Intelligence, Judiciary, Oversight and Government Reform, Armed Services, Financial Services, Rules, Ways and Means, and Transportation and Infrastructure; Passed the House on July 25, 2017 (419–3); Passed the Senate on July 27, 2017 (98–2); Signed into law by President Donald Trump on August 2, 2017

The Countering America's Adversaries Through Sanctions Act (CAATSA) is a United States federal law that imposed sanctions on Iran, North Korea, and Russia. It accomplishes this goal by preventing U.S. companies from doing business with sanctioned entities. The bill was passed by the Senate on July 27, 2017, 98–2, after it passed the House 419–3. It was signed into law on August 2, 2017, by President Donald Trump, who nevertheless believed that the legislation was "seriously flawed".

The bill consisted of three titles, with the first targeting Iran, the second targeting Russia, and the third imposing new sanctions on North Korea.

== Legislative history ==
On June 15, 2017, the United States Senate voted 98 to 2 for the bill (an amendment to the underlying Iran sanctions bill), which was rooted in a bill introduced in January that year by a bipartisan group of senators over Russia's continued involvement in the wars in Ukraine and Syria and its interference in the 2016 U.S. presidential election; with regard to Russia, the bill was designed to expand the punitive measures previously imposed by executive orders and convert them into law. The bill in the Senate incorporated the provisions of the Countering Russian Influence in Europe and Eurasia Act that was introduced in May 2017 by Senator Ben Cardin.

An identical bill was introduced by Democrats in the House of Representatives on July 12, 2017. While the bill's text was unchanged from what had passed the Senate on June 15, it was titled as House legislation to avoid procedural hurdles. The bill, after being revised to address some of the Trump administration's concerns, passed in the House 419 to 3 on July 25. On July 27, the bill was passed overwhelmingly by the Senate, 98 to 2. Support in both chambers was high enough to override a potential presidential veto. On August 2, 2017, President Donald Trump signed the bill into law.

== Provisions ==
Countering Iran's Destabilizing Activities Act of 2017

- CAATSA requires the President to impose sanctions against: (1) Iran's ballistic missile or weapons of mass destruction programs, (2) the sale or transfer to Iran of military equipment or the provision of related technical or financial assistance, and (3) Iran's Islamic Revolutionary Guard Corps and affiliated foreign persons.
- The President may impose sanctions against persons responsible for violations of internationally recognized human rights committed against individuals in Iran.
- The President may temporarily waive the imposition or continuation of sanctions under specified circumstances.

Countering Russian Influence in Europe and Eurasia Act of 2017

- The President must submit for congressional review certain proposed actions to terminate or waive sanctions with respect to the Russian Federation.
- Specified executive order sanctions against Russia shall remain in effect.
- The President may waive specified cyber- and Ukraine-related sanctions.
- The bill provides sanctions for activities concerning: (1) cyber security, (2) crude oil projects, (3) financial institutions, (4) corruption, (5) human rights abuses, (6) evasion of sanctions, (7) transactions with Russian defense or intelligence sectors, (8) export pipelines, (9) privatization of state-owned assets by government officials, and (10) arms transfers to Syria.
- The Department of State shall work with the government of Ukraine to increase Ukraine's energy security.
- The bill: (1) directs the Department of the Treasury to develop a national strategy for combating the financing of terrorism, and (2) includes the Secretary of the Treasury on the National Security Council.

The Act imposed new sanctions on Russia for interference in the 2016 U.S. elections and its involvement in Ukraine and Syria. The Act converted the punitive measures previously imposed by Executive Orders into law to prevent the President from easing, suspending or ending the sanctions without the approval of Congress.

Section 241 of the Act required that "not later than 180 days after the date of the enactment of this Act, the Secretary of the Treasury, in consultation with the Director of National Intelligence and the Secretary of State" submit to Congress a detailed report — with the option of containing a classified annex — that would include "identification of the most significant senior foreign political figures and oligarchs in the Russian Federation, as determined by their closeness to the Russian regime and their net worth" as well as an assessment of the relationship between such individuals and "President Vladimir Putin or other members of the Russian ruling elite". The section also called for an assessment of the "leadership structures and beneficial ownership" of Russian parastatal entities.

Korean Interdiction and Modernization of Sanctions Act

- The bill modifies and increases the President's authority to impose sanctions on persons in violation of certain United Nations Security Council resolutions regarding North Korea.
- U.S. financial institutions shall not establish or maintain correspondent accounts used by foreign financial institutions to provide indirect financial services to North Korea.
- A foreign government that provides to or receives from North Korea a defense article or service is prohibited from receiving certain types of U.S. foreign assistance.
- The bill provides sanctions against: (1) North Korean cargo and shipping, (2) goods produced in whole or part by North Korean convict or forced labor, and (3) foreign persons that employ North Korean forced laborers.
- The State Department shall submit a determination regarding whether North Korea meets the criteria for designation as a state sponsor of terrorism.

== Domestic reactions ==
=== President Trump ===
On the day President Trump signed the bill into law, he issued two separate, simultaneous signing statements. In the statement meant for Congress he said: "While I favor tough measures to punish and deter aggressive and destabilizing behavior by Iran, North Korea, and Russia, this legislation is significantly flawed. In its haste to pass this legislation, the Congress included a number of clearly unconstitutional provisions" — such as restrictions on executive branch′s authority that limited its flexibility in foreign policy. Among other things, the statement noted that the legislation ran afoul of the Zivotofsky v. Kerry ruling of the Supreme Court. The president appeared to indicate that he might choose not to enforce certain provisions of the legislation: "My Administration will give careful and respectful consideration to the preferences expressed by the Congress in these various provisions and will implement them in a manner consistent with the President's constitutional authority to conduct foreign relations." It also said: "Finally, my Administration particularly expects the Congress to refrain from using this flawed bill to hinder our important work with European allies to resolve the conflict in Ukraine, and from using it to hinder our efforts to address any unintended consequences it may have for American businesses, our friends, or our allies."

The other statement by Trump noted: "[T]he bill remains seriously flawed – particularly because it encroaches on the executive branch's authority to negotiate. Congress could not even negotiate a healthcare bill after seven years of talking. By limiting the Executive's flexibility, this bill makes it harder for the United States to strike good deals for the American people, and will drive China, Russia, and North Korea much closer together".

=== State Department ===
State Department spokeswoman Heather Nauert stated: "Since the enactment of the CAATSA legislation, we estimate that foreign governments have abandoned planned or announced purchases of several billion dollars in Russian defense acquisitions. Given the long timeframes generally associated with major defense deals, the results of this effort are only beginning to become apparent."

Secretary of State Mike Pompeo warned Egypt against purchasing Russian Sukhoi Su-35, saying "We've made clear that if those systems were to be purchased, the CAATSA statute would require sanctions on the regime."

=== Defense Department ===
Assistant Secretary of Defense Randall Schriver stated: "We understand historical India-Russia relationship. ... On CAATSA, Mattis did plea for an exception for India, but I can't guarantee a waiver will be used for future purchases."

== International reactions ==
=== European Union ===
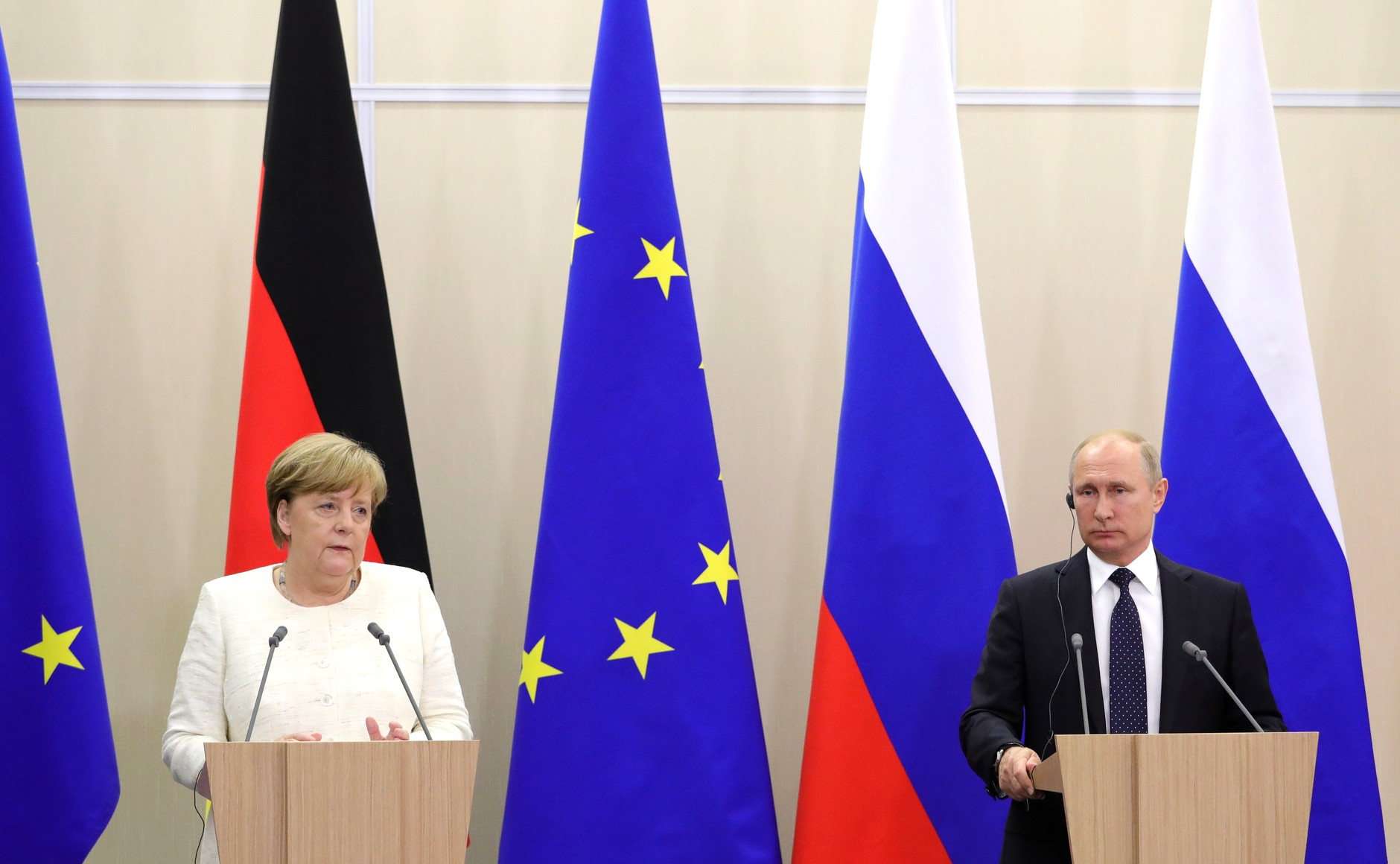
Angela Merkel criticized the draft of new sanctions against Russia that target EU–Russia energy projects.

In mid-June 2017, Germany and Austria issued a joint statement that said the proposed bill heralded a "new and very negative quality in European-American relations" and that certain provisions affecting gas pipeline projects with Russia were an illegal threat to EU energy security.

On July 26, 2017, France's foreign ministry described the new U.S. sanctions as illegal under international law due to their extraterritorial reach.

At the end of July 2017, the proposed law's Russia sanctions caused harsh criticism and threats of retaliatory measures on the part of the European Commission President Jean-Claude Juncker. Germany's Minister for Economics and Energy Brigitte Zypries described the sanctions as illegal under international law and urged the EU to take appropriate counter-measures.

=== India ===
In October 2018, India signed a US$5.43 billion deal with Russia to procure four S-400 Triumf surface-to-air missile defense systems, while ignoring the CAATSA. The U.S. threatened India with sanctions over India's decision to buy the S-400 missile defense systems from Russia.

According to the President of the U.S.-India Strategic Partnership Forum (USISPF), Mukesh Aghi:

Critics who think that India should avoid the S-400 purchase misread the situation. Simply put, sanctions would have a disastrous effect on U.S.-India relations for decades to come. In India's eyes, the United States would once again be regarded as untrustworthy. Sanctions would push India closer to Russia at a time when India is reeling from the decision to withdraw from the Iran deal—Iran is India's third largest supplier of crude oil.

Two oil companies ordered crude oil from Iran for November ignoring CAATSA. The United States threatened India with sanctions over India's decision to buy oil from Iran.

On July 15, 2022, the United States House of Representatives passed a legislative amendment that granted India a waiver from CAATSA-related sanctions connected to the purchase of the S-400; however the amendment is yet to be passed by the United States Senate.

=== Indonesia ===
According to the Australian Strategic Policy Institute, CAATSA has resulted in delays to the Indonesian purchase of Russian Sukhoi Su-35 fighter aircraft and "[the] willingness of the U.S. to impose [CAATSA] sanctions, or whether any waiver might be obtained, has been at the forefront of security diplomacy between Washington and Jakarta in recent months."

In March 2020, the Trump administration pressured Indonesia into dropping deals to buy Russian made Sukhoi Su-35 fighter jets and Chinese naval vessels. According to an official familiar with the matter, president Joko Widodo's administration was concerned that the U.S. would take punitive actions on trade and implement economic sanctions against Indonesia if the deals were completed.

=== Iran ===
On August 2, 2017, Iranian Deputy Foreign Minister Abbas Araqchi stated in an interview with state TV that, "In our view the nuclear deal has been violated and we will show an appropriate and proportional reaction to this issue,".

=== North Korea ===
North Korean foreign ministry officials said that "U.S. bid for imposing sanctions on different countries around the world is entirely outrageous leverage to meet its own interests" and suggesting that the "sanctions bill" against the DPRK, Russia and Iran which recently passed the U.S. Congress is prompting a growing international backlash, citing reactions by Russia, China, Venezuela, Germany, Austria and France.

=== Russia ===
After the bill passed the Senate, Russia's foreign ministry announced measures that were cast as a response to the bill passed by Congress, but also referenced the specific measures imposed against the Russian diplomatic mission in the U.S. by the Obama administration at the end of 2016. Russia demanded that the U.S. reduce its diplomatic and technical personnel in the Moscow embassy and its consulates in Saint Petersburg, Yekaterinburg and Vladivostok to 455 persons — the same as the number of Russian diplomats posted in the U.S. — by September 1; Russia's government would also suspend the use of a retreat compound and a storage facility in Moscow used by the U.S. by August 1. Shortly after, Russian president Vladimir Putin said that the decision had been taken by him personally and that 755 employees of the U.S. diplomatic mission must "terminate their activity in the Russian Federation".

After the bill was signed, the Russian Foreign Ministry attributed the sanctions to "Russophobic hysteria" and reserved the right to take action if it decided to. Russian prime minister Dmitry Medvedev wrote on August 2 that the law had ended hope for improving U.S.–Russia relations and meant "an all-out trade war with Russia." His message also said, "The American establishment has won an overwhelming victory over Trump. The president wasn't happy with the new sanctions, but he had to sign the bill."

In June 2020, U.S. Senate Majority Whip John Thune (R-SD), proposed an amendment to the 2021 National Defense Authorization Act to allow the U.S. Department of Defense to purchase Turkey’s Russian-made S-400 missile system, using the U.S. Army’s missile procurement account. The reasoning is that this would remove the issue of Turkey having a foreign military system that contravenes the CAATSA. This would then allow the U.S. to re-integrate Turkey into the F-35 Lightning II acquisition and ownership program.

=== Turkey ===
In late 2017, Turkish President Recep Tayyip Erdoğan and Russian officials agreed to the purchase of S-400 missiles worth $2.5 billion. Secretary of State Mike Pompeo raised concerns over the deal, but Turkish officials rejected the U.S. threat of sanctions under the CAATSA, citing existing international protocols and agreements mutually signed and agreed by Turkey and Russia, and that the Russian offer was a better deal than the Patriot system offered by the U.S. In December 2020 the U.S. imposed five restrictions against the Turkish Defence Industry Agency and its leaders and removed Turkey from the F-35 Joint Strike Fighter partnership. On July 7, 2026, President Trump announced that he would lift sanctions against Türkiye during the 2026 Ankara NATO summit.

== Implementation ==
On September 29, 2017, president Donald Trump issued a presidential memorandum that delegated certain functions and authorities under the Countering America's Adversaries Through Sanctions Act as well as the 2014 Ukraine Freedom Support Act, and the 2014 Support for the Sovereignty, Integrity, Democracy, and Economic Stability of Ukraine Act to the Secretary of State, the Secretary of the Treasury, and the Director of National Intelligence.

Amendment of the relevant directives done by the U.S. Department of the Treasury on September 29, 2017, referred to the Countering Russian Influence in Europe and Eurasia Act of 2017 (CRIEEA) and further toughened the Sectoral Sanctions against Russia.

On October 11, 2017, in a joint statement, Sens. John McCain (R-AZ) and Ben Cardin (D-MD) questioned the Trump administration's commitment to the sanctions bill noting that the White House had "had plenty of time to get their act together" after missing an October 1 deadline to identify Kremlin-linked targets.

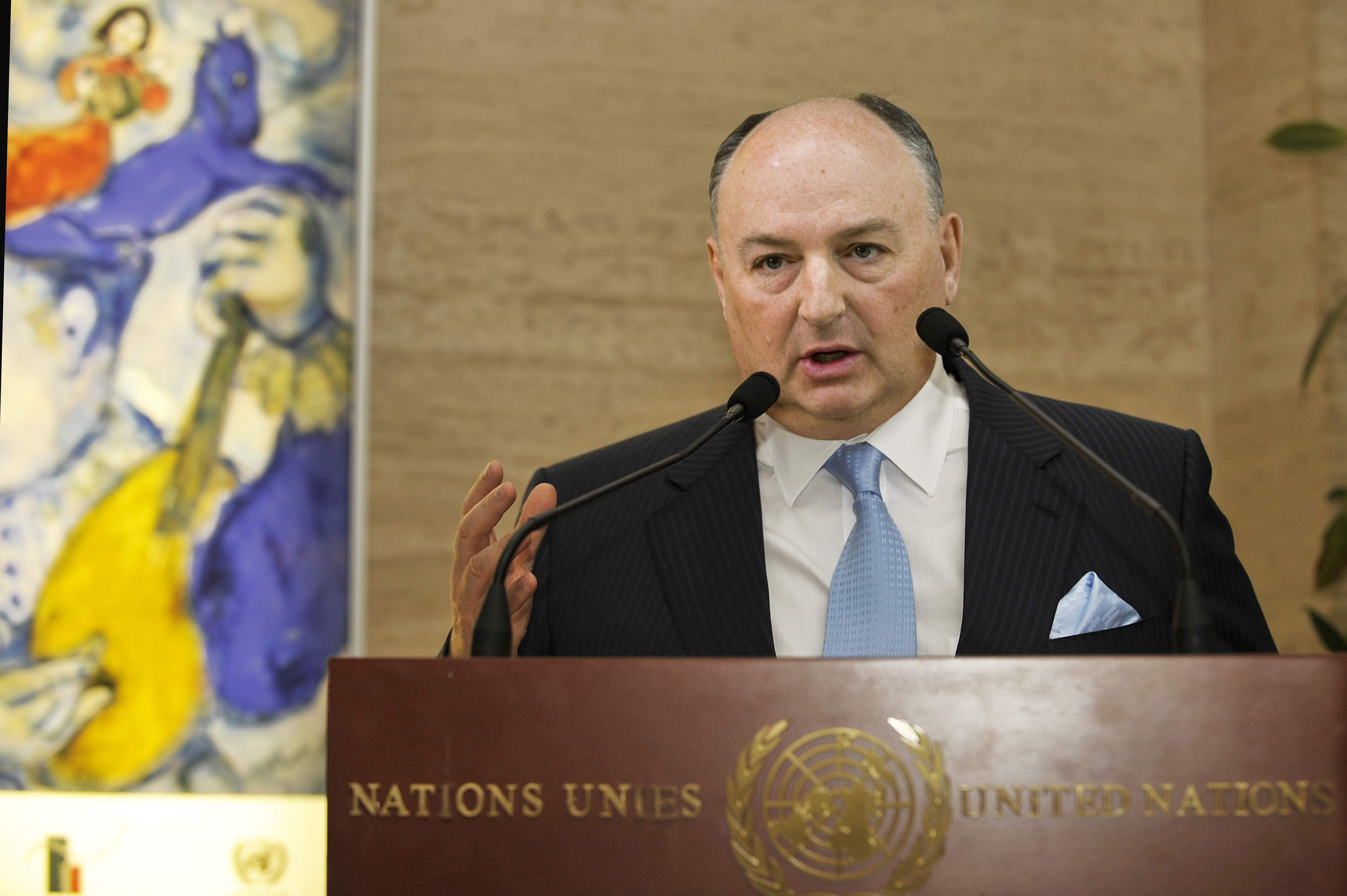
President of the World Holocaust Forum Foundation (WHF) Viatcheslav Moshe Kantor is on the list of Russian "oligarchs" named in the CAATSA unclassified report.

At the end of November 2017, Reuters reported that a U.S. government blacklist of persons likely to be sanctioned, albeit not automatically, was to be drawn up by the Treasury Department and sent to Congress by the end of January 2018; the prospect of being included in the list already had the entire Russian business elite concerned, while the Kremlin viewed the U.S. move as an attempt to turn Putin's allies against him weeks before the presidential election. Daniel Fried, Coordinator for Sanctions Policy (January 2013–February 2017), in early December 2017 said that Congress's resolve on the Russia sanctions was sowing fear in Russia, the goal being to "freeze them out of the U.S. system, freeze them out of the dollar and pretty much make them radioactive."

On January 29, 2018, the Trump administration submitted to Congress five reports as mandated by CAATSA, including those on Iran's missile programme, sanctioned persons of North Korea, and two versions (both classified and unclassified) of the report "regarding senior political figures and oligarchs in the Russian Federation and Russian parastatal entities". The unclassified list published the following day by the Treasury Department contained names of 210 people, including 96 Russian tycoons close to president Vladimir Putin with wealth of $1 billion or more, as well as top Russian statespersons and officials, including Russian Prime Minister Dmitry Medvedev, but excluding Vladimir Putin, all information having been drawn from public sources. The Treasury Department formally explained the legal significance of publishing names of the individuals and entities included in its January 29, 2018, report on Russia: "This report is not a "sanctions list."" Speaking to the Senate Banking Committee on January 30, the Treasury Secretary Steven Mnuchin said: "The intent was not to have sanctions by the delivery report last night. The intent was to do an extremely thorough analysis — it's hundreds of pages — and there will be sanctions that come out of this report."

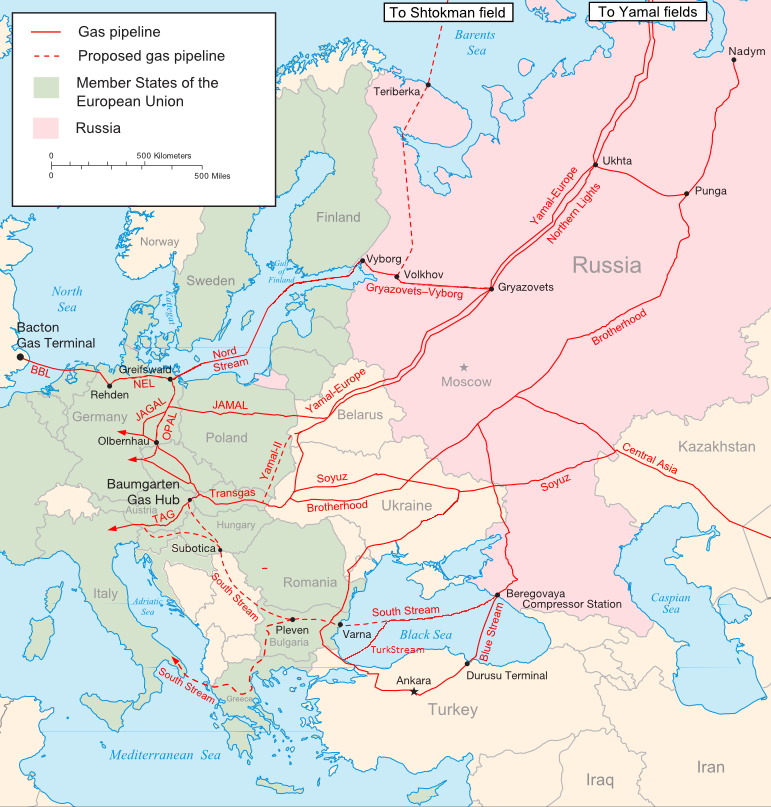
Major existing and planned natural gas pipelines supplying Russian gas to Europe. Germany imports 50% to 75% of its natural gas from Russia.

On March 15, 2018, Mnuchin unveiled a series of sanctions, first time under CAATSA as well as Executive Order 13694, against various Russian entities and individuals, including the Russians indicted in Special Counsel investigation, the Main Intelligence Directorate, and the Federal Security Service. Mnuchin issued a statement, saying: "The Administration is confronting and countering malign Russian cyber activity, including their attempted interference in U.S. elections, destructive cyber-attacks, and intrusions targeting critical infrastructure. These targeted sanctions are a part of a broader effort to address the ongoing nefarious attacks emanating from Russia. Treasury intends to impose additional CAATSA sanctions, informed by our intelligence community, to hold Russian government officials and oligarchs accountable for their destabilizing activities by severing their access to the U.S. financial system."

In mid-May 2018, Senators Bob Menendez (D-NJ), Mark Warner (D-VA), and Sherrod Brown (D-OH), in a letter addressed to the inspectors general of the State Department, Treasury Department and Intelligence Community, alleged that the Trump administration had failed to fully comply with the provisions of the CAATSA and requested investigations into that.

On September 20, 2018, the U.S. government for the first time imposed secondary sanctions under CAATSA by sanctioning China's Equipment Development Department of the Central Military Commission and its director, Li Shangfu, for "engaging in significant transactions with persons" on the List of Specified Persons, namely for transactions that involved "Russia's transfer to China of Su-35 combat aircraft and S-400 surface-to-air missile system-related equipment".

In January 2019, U.S. Ambassador to Germany Richard Grenell told Handelsblatt that European companies participating in the construction of Nord Stream 2 gas pipeline are "always in danger", because sanctions under the CAATSA are "always possible". The Trump administration has long opposed the Russian-backed Nord Stream 2 — a pipeline for delivering natural gas from Russia to Germany. Within that context Grenell also sent letters to German companies involved in the construction of said Nord Stream 2, threatening sanctions.

Businesses involved in Nord Stream 2 natural gas pipeline have been sanctioned by the United States, which has been seeking to sell more of its own liquefied natural gas (LNG) to European states, with the passing of the National Defense Authorization Act for Fiscal Year 2020 on December 20, 2019. German Finance Minister Olaf Scholz called the sanctions "a severe intervention in German and European internal affairs", while the European Union spokesman criticized "the imposition of sanctions against EU companies conducting legitimate business." Russian Foreign Minister Sergey Lavrov also criticized sanctions, saying that U.S. Congress "is literally overwhelmed with the desire to do everything to destroy" the U.S.–Russia relations.

On December 8, 2020, the House of Representatives adopted sanctions against NATO member Turkey due to its purchase of S-400 missile system from Russia. Trump administration said that the president will veto the bill. Trump had earlier worked to delay passing sanctions against Turkey, but he lost the 2020 United States presidential election. On December 14, 2020, the United States imposed the sanctions on Turkey, and the sanctions included a ban on all U.S. export licenses and authorizations to Turkey's Presidency of Defense Industries (SSB) and an asset freeze and visa restrictions on Dr. Ismail Demir, SSB's president, and other SSB officers. The United States also excluded Turkey from the joint F-35 project, as well as barred Turkey from approaching new NATO technological development.

In January 2021, the Trump administration imposed sanctions on the Russian pipe-laying ship “Fortuna” and its owner, KVT-RUS.

Discussions concerning the implementation of CAATSA were prominent in foreign countries during the 2022 Russian invasion of Ukraine. The full-scale invasion embarrassed Germany that had refused to heed warnings from the U.S. about the Nord Stream 2's geopolitical dangers. Soon after the invasion, Nord Stream 2 was cancelled.

== List of Russian nationals named in the CAATSA unclassified report ==
The list of "oligarchs" and businessmen submitted as part of one of the five reports delivered to Congress on January 29, 2018, included 96 names.

Although it was widely, and incorrectly, reported in the media that those on the list "may be subject to sanctions", the CAATSA Report itself made clear that it "in no way should be interpreted to impose sanctions on those individuals or entities". It also specified that inclusion in the report "does not constitute the determination by any agency that any of those individuals or entities meet the criteria for designation under any sanctions program", and in no way indicates that "the U.S. Government has information about the individual's involvement in malign activities".

Shortly after the list was released, it was reported that the Treasury Department had simply copied it from the Forbes' 2017 "World Billionaires" list: people, including those with non-Russian citizenship on the Forbes list who had Russian heritage and a net worth of $1 billion or more, had been indiscriminately included in the CAATSA Report. In its response to a lawsuit asserting that the compilation of the list was "arbitrary, capricious, and contrary to law", the Treasury Department has confirmed that it is "not challenging" the allegation that it had "simply republished" the Forbes billionaires list.

== Criticism ==
Ian Storey, a senior fellow at Singapore's ISEAS–Yusof Ishak Institute, wrote that "Washington's efforts to curb Moscow's global arms sales may have the unintended effect of obstructing some Southeast Asian countries' attempts to resist Beijing's relentless advances; they may even enhance China's influence."

According to the Stratfor, "the CAATSA process could discourage Vietnam from further building its defense relationship with the United States, if only to avoid future compromises to its strategic autonomy. ... In today's world, middle powers are increasingly assertive and refuse to tie themselves to any single great power. The United States' reliance on the blunt tool of extraterritoriality could eventually backfire if it's not careful."

On December 8, 2020, the House of Representatives approved a sanctions package against Turkey due to its purchase of S-400 missile system from Russia. Subsequently, doubts were raised by a number of international policy analysts that military sanctions on the NATO ally would weaken the alliance, effectively reducing Turkey's ability to obtain American technology for regional defense.

Secretary of Defence James Mattis has argued that the Congress should amend CAATSA and give the administration wide authority to grant waivers. Senators John Cornyn and Mark Warner urged President Joe Biden to waive sanctions against India as it could adversely affect U.S.-India cooperation against China.

== See also ==
- Defending American Security from Kremlin Aggression Act (DASKA)
- Defending Elections from Threats by Establishing Redlines Act (DETER)
- Sanctions against North Korea
- Sanctions against Russia
- United States sanctions against Iran
- Iran–United States relations during the first Trump administration
- Russia–United States relations
- North Korea–United States relations
