= Institute for Indo-Pacific Security =

American think tank

- Established: 2008; 18 years ago
- Founders: Randall Schriver, Mark Stokes
- Type: 501(c)(3) Non-profit think tank
- Tax ID no.: 26-1894546
- Purpose: "... to guide decision makers toward a more secure Asia by the century’s mid-point."
- Location(s): 2300 Clarendon Blvd., Arlington, VA 22201
- Chairman of the Board: Randall Schriver
- President: John Gastright
- Senior Director: Michael Mazza
- Senior Director: Jennifer Hong
- Website: indopacificsecurity.org
- Formerly called: Project 2049 Institute

The Institute for Indo-Pacific Security, formerly known as the Project 2049 Institute, is a non-partisan think tank based in Arlington, Virginia focusing on United States foreign policy and security issues in the Asia-Pacific region, particularly those related to China and Taiwan. It receives "grants and contracts from the U.S. government, like-minded governments, charitable foundations, major corporations, and individual donors."

== History ==
The institute was founded in 2008 by former Assistant Secretary of Defense for Indo-Pacific Security Affairs Randall Schriver and retired US Air Force Lieutenant Colonel Mark Stokes. Former U.S. Deputy Secretary of State Richard Armitage served as chairman until January 2020.

The institute is strongly supportive of Taiwan, and has called for the full normalization of relations between the United States and Taiwan.

In February 2020, Taiwanese President Tsai Ing-wen received Project 2049 Institute chairman Randall Schriver at the Presidential Office in Taipei.

In April 2025, the Project 2049 Institute officially changed its name to the Institute for Indo-Pacific Security "to reflect both the Indo-Pacific region’s growing complexity and Project 2049’s expanding research portfolio."

== Leadership ==
In January 2024, Michael Mazza was announced as the institute's new senior director.
