= Kelly Magsamen =

American foreign policy advisor

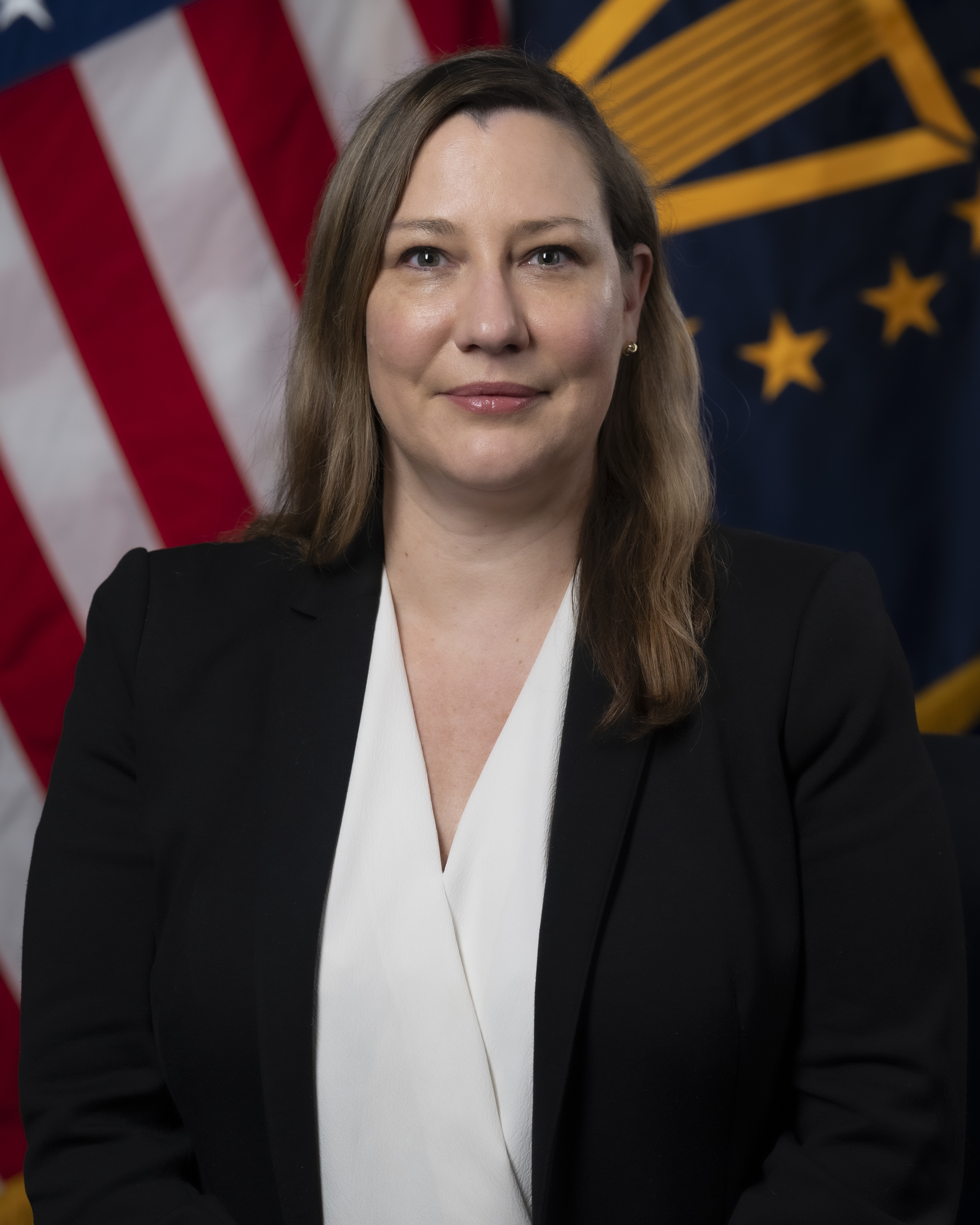

Chief of Staff to the United States Secretary of Defense
- In office January 20, 2021 – June 28, 2024
- President: Joe Biden
- Preceded by: Kash Patel
- Succeeded by: Derek Chollet

Assistant Secretary of Defense for Indo-Pacific Security Affairs
- In office June 10, 2016 – January 20, 2017; Acting
- President: Barack Obama
- Preceded by: David B. Shear
- Succeeded by: David F. Helvey (acting)

Personal details
- Education: American University (BA); Johns Hopkins University (MA)

Kelly E. Magsamen is an American foreign policy and national security advisor who served as the chief of staff to the United States Secretary of Defense in the Biden administration. She was previously the vice president for national security and international policy at the Center for American Progress.

She resigned as chief of staff in June 2024.

== Education ==
She earned a Bachelor of Arts degree from American University and a Master of Arts from Johns Hopkins University.

== Career ==
Magsamen began her career at the United States Department of State, specializing in Iraq policy. She later served as the principal deputy assistant secretary of defense for Asian and Pacific Security Affairs, where she managed strategy related to Asia and the South China Sea. During the Obama administration, Magsamen worked as a staffer on the United States National Security Council.

Magsamen has appeared as a commentator on NPR. She has written op-ed columns on national security issues for Defense One, Foreign Policy, The Washington Post, The Hill, and others.
