= Longitude (disambiguation) =

Longitude is a geographic coordinate that specifies the east–west position of a point on the Earth's surface, or the surface of a celestial body.

Longitude may also refer to:

- Celestial longitude, used to record positions of planets
- Longitude rewards, a British inducement prize for a solution to the longitude problem
  - Longitude (book), by Dava Sobel about John Harrison
  - Longitude (TV series), a 2000 TV drama produced from the book
- Longitude Prize, an inducement prize contest inspired from the longitude rewards
- Cessna Citation Longitude, a business jet
- Longitude Festival, an annual music festival in Dublin, Ireland
- Longitude LLC, a private business in parimutuel betting technology
