= Assistant Secretary of Defense for Indo-Pacific Security Affairs =

Defense role for the Asia Pacific region

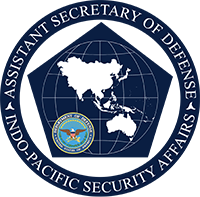
- Seal of the assistant secretary of defense for Indo-Pacific security affairs

- Flag of an assistant secretary of defense

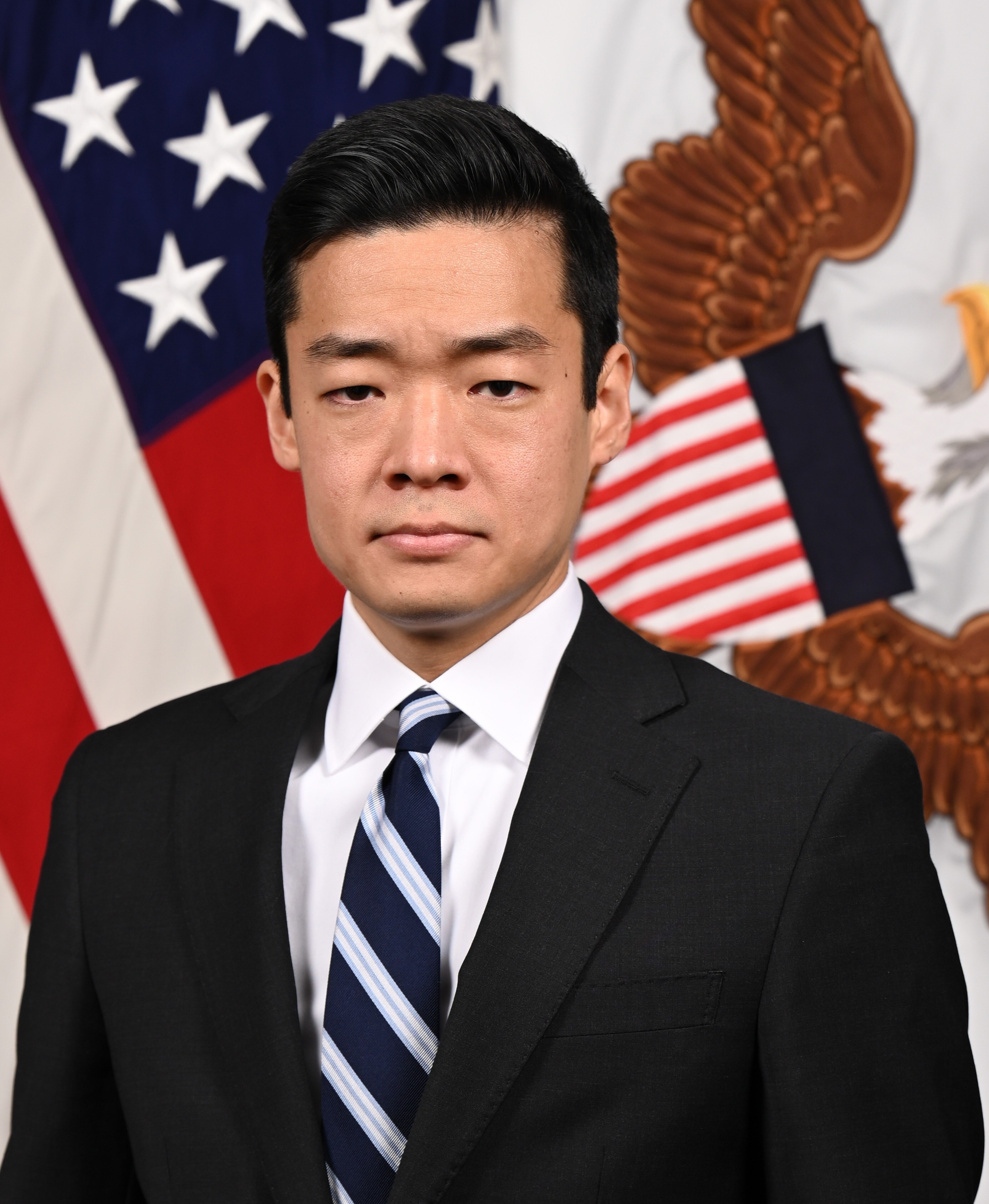
- Incumbent; John Noh since December 29, 2025
- Under Secretary of Defense for Policy
- Appointer: The president with Senate advice and consent
- Term length: No fixed term
- Inaugural holder: James J. Shinn
- Deputy: Principal Deputy Assistant Secretary of Defense
- Website: Official website

The assistant secretary of defense for Indo-Pacific security affairs, or ASD (IPSA), is the principal advisor to the under secretary of defense for policy (USD(P)) and the secretary of defense on international security strategy and policy on issues of DoD interest that relate to the governments and defense establishments of the nations and international organizations within the Indo-Pacific region. It primarily includes the entire region from India to Japan, and the region where ASEAN is located. The position was originally titled assistant secretary of defense for Asian and Pacific security affairs but was renamed by the first Trump administration alongside the renaming of the United States Indo-Pacific Command.

== Officeholders ==
Assistant secretaries of defense (Asian and Pacific security affairs/Indo-Pacific security affairs)
Name	Tenure	SecDef(s) served under	President(s) served under
James J. Shinn	December 19, 2007 – November 14, 2008	Robert M. Gates	George W. Bush
Mitchell Shivers (Acting)	November 14, 2008 – January 20, 2009	Robert M. Gates	George W. Bush
Derek Mitchell (Acting)	April 1, 2009 – May 12, 2009	Robert M. Gates	Barack Obama
Lieutenant General Wallace "Chip" Gregson (Ret.)	May 13, 2009 – April 1, 2011	Robert M. Gates	Barack Obama
Derek Mitchell (Acting)	April 2, 2011 – August 12, 2011	Robert M. Gates; Leon Panetta	Barack Obama
Peter R. Lavoy (Acting)	August 15, 2011 – May 8, 2012	Leon Panetta	Barack Obama
Mark Lippert	May 9, 2012 – April 24, 2013	Leon Panetta; Chuck Hagel	Barack Obama
Peter R. Lavoy (Acting)	May 1, 2013 – January 10, 2014	Chuck Hagel	Barack Obama
David B. Shear	July 17, 2014 – June 10, 2016	Chuck Hagel; Ashton Carter	Barack Obama
Kelly E. Magsamen (Acting)	June 10, 2016 – January 20, 2017	Ashton Carter	Barack Obama
David F. Helvey (Acting)	January 20, 2017 – December 29, 2017	James Mattis	Donald Trump
Randall Schriver	December 29, 2017 – December 31, 2019	James Mattis; Mark Esper	Donald Trump
David F. Helvey (Acting)	January 1, 2020 – June 14, 2021	Mark Esper	Donald Trump
David F. Helvey (Acting)	January 1, 2020 – June 14, 2021	Lloyd Austin	Joe Biden
Kenneth Handelman (acting)	June 14, 2021 - July 25, 2021	Lloyd Austin	Joe Biden
Ely Ratner	July 25, 2021 – January 20, 2025	Lloyd Austin	Joe Biden
John Noh (acting)	January 22, 2025 – June 2, 2025	Pete Hegseth	Donald Trump
Jedidiah Royal (acting)	June 2, 2025 – December 29, 2025	Pete Hegseth	Donald Trump
John Noh	December 29, 2025 – Present	Pete Hegseth	Donald Trump

== Role and responsibilities ==
Like the assistant secretary of defense for international security affairs, the ASD (IPSA) is responsible for oversight of security cooperation programs and foreign military sales programs within the regions under its supervision. The ASD (IPSA) also works closely with the United States Indo-Pacific Command, United States Central Command, and the Asia-Pacific Center for Security Studies. Finally, the ASD (IPSA) represents the USD(P) and the secretary of defense in interagency policy deliberations and international negotiations related to the Asia-Pacific region. The Office of the ASD (IPSA) is an entity of the Office of the Secretary of Defense.

== Structure ==
This office was created in 2007. It is composed of at least six country/sub-regional desks, each staffed by a senior country director. Most desks are also supported by an assistant country director or group of country directors. As of February 2011, the desks listed on the APSA website included:

- Australia, New Zealand, and South Pacific Islands
- Burma, Cambodia, Laos, Thailand, Vietnam
- China, Hong Kong, Mongolia, Taiwan
- Japan
- Korea
- Indonesia, Malaysia, Philippines, Singapore, Brunei, East Timor

However, this list must be incomplete, since the office also has oversight of programs in Central Asia, Afghanistan and Pakistan, as well as India and other Asian nations.

Depending on their areas of coverage, the country/sub-regional desks report to four different deputy assistant secretaries:

- DASD East Asia
- DASD China
- DASD South & Southeast Asia
- DASD Afghanistan, Pakistan and Central Asia.

DASDs are appointed by the secretary of defense. Some are appointed from civilian life, while others are career defense officials. Once at the DASD level, the latter are considered a part of the DoD Senior Executive Service.

The ASD (APSA) is also supported by a principal deputy, or PDASD, who helps oversee the DASDs and the office's country/sub-regional desks.

=== Principal deputy assistant secretaries for Asian and Pacific security affairs/Indo-Pacific security affairs ===
Name	Tenure	ASD (APSA) served under	USD(P) served under	SecDef(s) served under	President(s) served under
Mitchell Shivers	June 2008 – January 2009	James J. Shinn	Eric S. Edelman	Robert M. Gates	George W. Bush
Derek Mitchell	April 2009 – August 2011	Wallace "Chip" Gregson	Michèle Flournoy	Robert M. Gates; Leon Panetta	Barack Obama
Dr. Peter R. Lavoy	August 2011 – February 2014	Mark Lippert	Michèle Flournoy; James N. Miller	Leon Panetta	Barack Obama
Kelly E. Magsamen	February 2014 – January 2017	David B. Shear	Michael D. Lumpkin; Christine E. Wormuth; Brian P. McKeon	Ashton Carter	Barack Obama
David F. Helvey (acting)	June 2016 – January 2017	Kelly E. Magsamen (acting)	Brian P. McKeon	Ashton Carter	Barack Obama
David F. Helvey	January 2017 – May 2021	David F. Helvey (acting); Randall G. Schriver	Robert Karem (acting); David Trachtenberg (acting); John C. Rood	James Mattis	Donald Trump
David F. Helvey	January 2017 – May 2021		Colin Kahl	Lloyd Austin	Joe Biden

=== Deputy assistant secretaries of defense reporting to the ASD (APSA) ===
The list below details both the current DASD and previous DASD posts in this office.

Name	Tenure	ASD (APSA) served under	USD(P) served under	SecDef(s) served under	President(s) served under
Active offices
DASD (APSA), East Asia
David Samuel Sedney	2007–2009	James J. Shinn; Derek Mitchell	Eric S. Edelman	Robert M. Gates	George W. Bush
R. Michael Schiffer	May 6, 2009 – 2012	Wallace "Chip" Gregson; Derek Mitchell	Michele Flournoy	Robert M. Gates	Barack Obama
David Helvey	2013–2015	David Shear	James N. Miller Michael D. Lumpkin Christine E. Wormuth	Chuck Hagel Ash Carter	Barack Obama
Abraham M. Denmark	2015 – January 2017	David Shear; Kelly E. Magsamen	Brian P. Mckeon	Ashton Carter	Barack Obama
BGen Roberta L. Shea	July 2017 – May 2019	David F. Helvey	Robert Karem; Joseph D. Kernan	James Mattis; Mark Esper	Donald Trump
Heino Klinck	August 2019 – january 2021	Randall Schriver; David F. Helvey	Joseph D. Kernan	Mark Esper	Donald Trump
Siddharth Mohandas	2021 - Present	David F. Helvey Ely Ratner	Colin Kahl	Lloyd Austin	Joe Biden
DASD (APSA), China
Chad Sbragia	June 2019 – January 2021	Randall Schriver; David F. Helvey	Joseph D. Kernan	Mark Esper	Donald Trump
Michael S. Chase	February 2021 - Present	David F. Helvey Ely Ratner	Colin Kahl	Lloyd Austin	Joe Biden
DASD (APSA), South and Southeast Asia
James Clad	March 2007 – January 2009	James J. Shinn	Eric S. Edelman	Robert M. Gates	George W. Bush
Robert Scher	May 6, 2009 – April 2012	Wallace "Chip" Gregson; Derek Mitchell	Michele Flournoy	Robert M. Gates	Barack Obama
Joseph Felter	July 2017 – September 2019	David F. Helvey; Randall Schriver; David F. Helvey	Robert Karem; Joseph D. Kernan	James Mattis; Mark Esper	Donald Trump
Lindsey W. Ford	2021 - Present	David F. Helvey Ely Ratner	Colin Kahl	Lloyd Austin	Joe Biden
DASD (APSA), Afghanistan, Pakistan, and Central Asia
David Samuel Sedney	2009 – May 2013	Wallace "Chip" Gregson; Derek Mitchell	Michele Flournoy	Robert M. Gates	Barack Obama
Thomas Croci	February 3, 2020 – January 19, 2021	David F. Helvey	Joseph D. Kernan	Mark Esper	Donald Trump
Rebecca Zimmerman	February 16, 2021 - Present	David F. Helvey Ely Ratner	Colin Kahl	Lloyd Austin	Joe Biden
Defunct offices
DASD (APSA), Central Asia
Mitchell Shivers	2007 – June 2008	James J. Shinn	Eric S. Edelman	Robert M. Gates	George W. Bush
