= Defending American Security from Kremlin Aggression Act =

2018 United States federal law

The Defending American Security from Kremlin Aggression Act, known by the acronym DASKA, was introduced by Senators Lindsey Graham (R-SC), Bob Menendez (D-NJ), Cory Gardner (R-CO), Ben Cardin (D-MD), John McCain (R-AZ), and Jeanne Shaheen (D-NH) on August 2, 2018.

== Introduction and passage in Congress ==
In a joint statement on August 2, 2018, Senator Lindsey Graham said, "Our goal is to change the status quo and impose crushing sanctions and other measures against Putin’s Russia until he ceases and desists meddling in the US electoral process, halts cyber-attacks on US infrastructure, removes Russia from Ukraine, and ceases efforts to create chaos in Syria. The sanctions and other measures contained in this bill are the most hard-hitting ever imposed – and a direct result of Putin’s continued desire to undermine American democracy. I strongly believe that DNI Coats’ assessment – that the warning lights are blinking red when it comes to Russian meddling in the 2018 election – is accurate. These sanctions and other measures are designed to respond in the strongest possible fashion."

On August 8, the Russian business-oriented newspaper Kommersant published the full draft text of the bill. This caused the ruble to fall 2.2%.

Provisions in the draft bill include:

- A ban on some of Russia's largest state banks
- Sanctions on investment in Russian government or affiliated oil and gas companies
- Sanctions on Russian individuals suspected of cyber attacks against the United States
- A new Sanctions Office to fortify the Countering America's Adversaries Through Sanctions Act

On 11 December 2019, the U.S. Senate Foreign Relations Committee approved four energy bills, including the ″Energy Security Cooperation with Allied Partners in Europe Act of 2019″, which is meant to counter Russia’s Nord Stream 2 pipeline, but the committee did not consider DASKA. On 18 December, the Senate panel approved DASKA, with the vote being 17–5 (all five “no” votes came from Republicans); but there was no indication of when the full Senate might vote on the measure.

== Reactions ==
In February 2019, Russian presidential spokesman Dmitry Peskov responded to determining Putin's wealth with "It can hardly be taken seriously. Most probably it’s another Russophobic fuss."

== See also ==
- Countering America's Adversaries Through Sanctions Act (CAATSA)
- Defending Elections from Threats by Establishing Redlines Act (DETER)
