= Peter Lavoy =

American scholar and government official

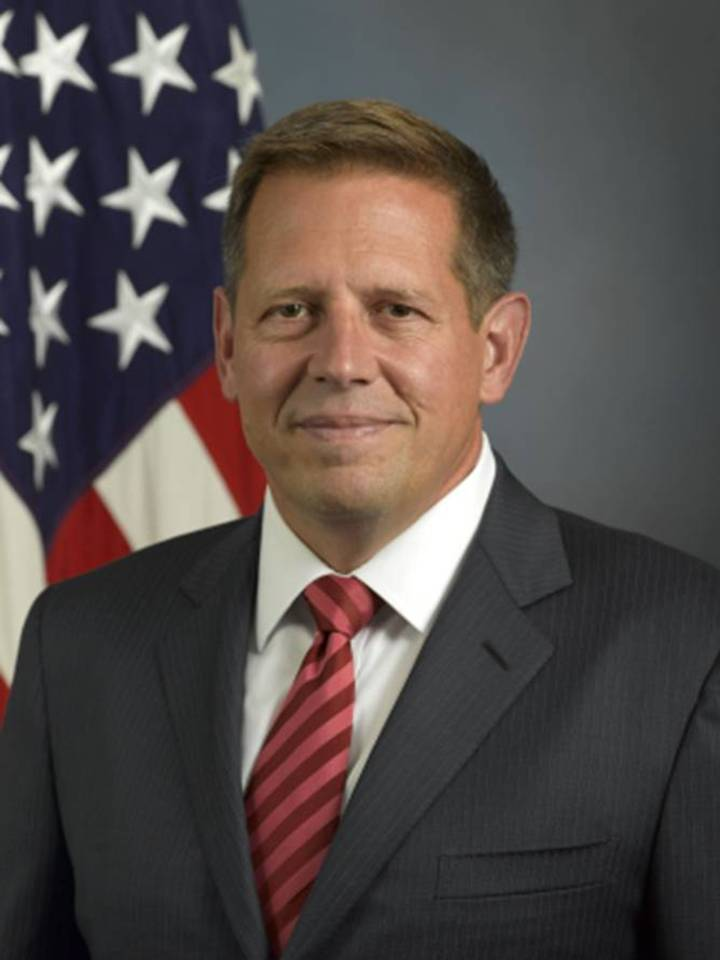

Peter R. Lavoy, left in Mongolia in 2013

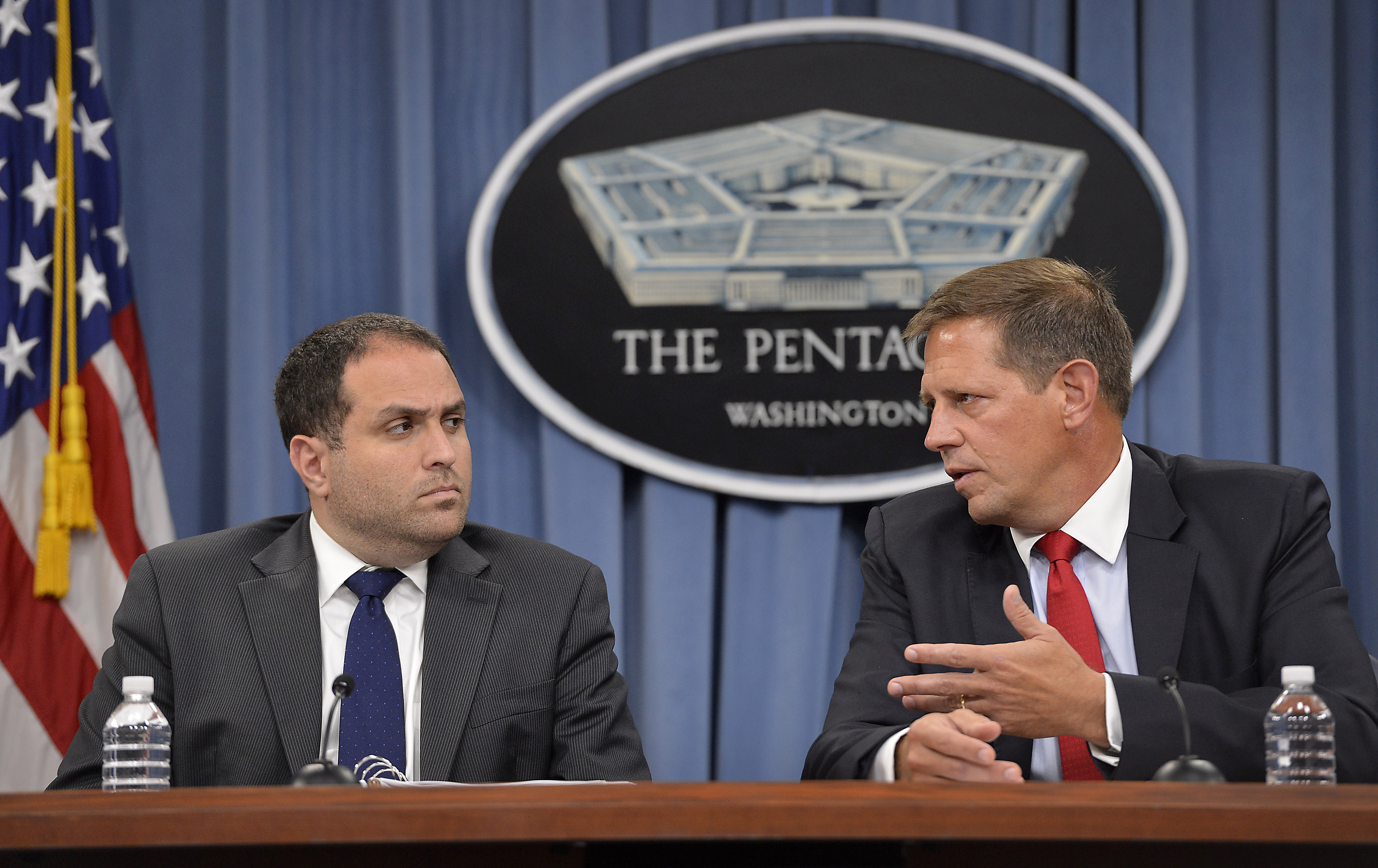
Peter Lavoy, right, with Jarrett Blanc at a 2013 Pentagon press briefing

Peter Lavoy is an American scholar and former high ranking U.S. security official. He has served in roles including acting Assistant Secretary of Defense for Asian and Pacific Security Affairs, Deputy Director of National Intelligence for Analysis, chairman of the National Intelligence Council and National Intelligence Officer for South Asia. In March 2015 he was appointed senior director for South Asian affairs at the National Security Council.

He was succeeded in that post by Robin Fontes in 2017. Lavoy is the editor of Asymmetric Warfare in South Asia (2009), a volume on the Kargil conflict of 1999.

In 2003 Lavoy was director of the Center for Contemporary Conflict and co-director of the Regional Security Education Program at the Naval Postgraduate School. From June 1998 to June 2000 he served as director for Counterproliferation Policy in the Office of the Secretary of Defense.
