= Ely Ratner =

American political scientist (born 1977)

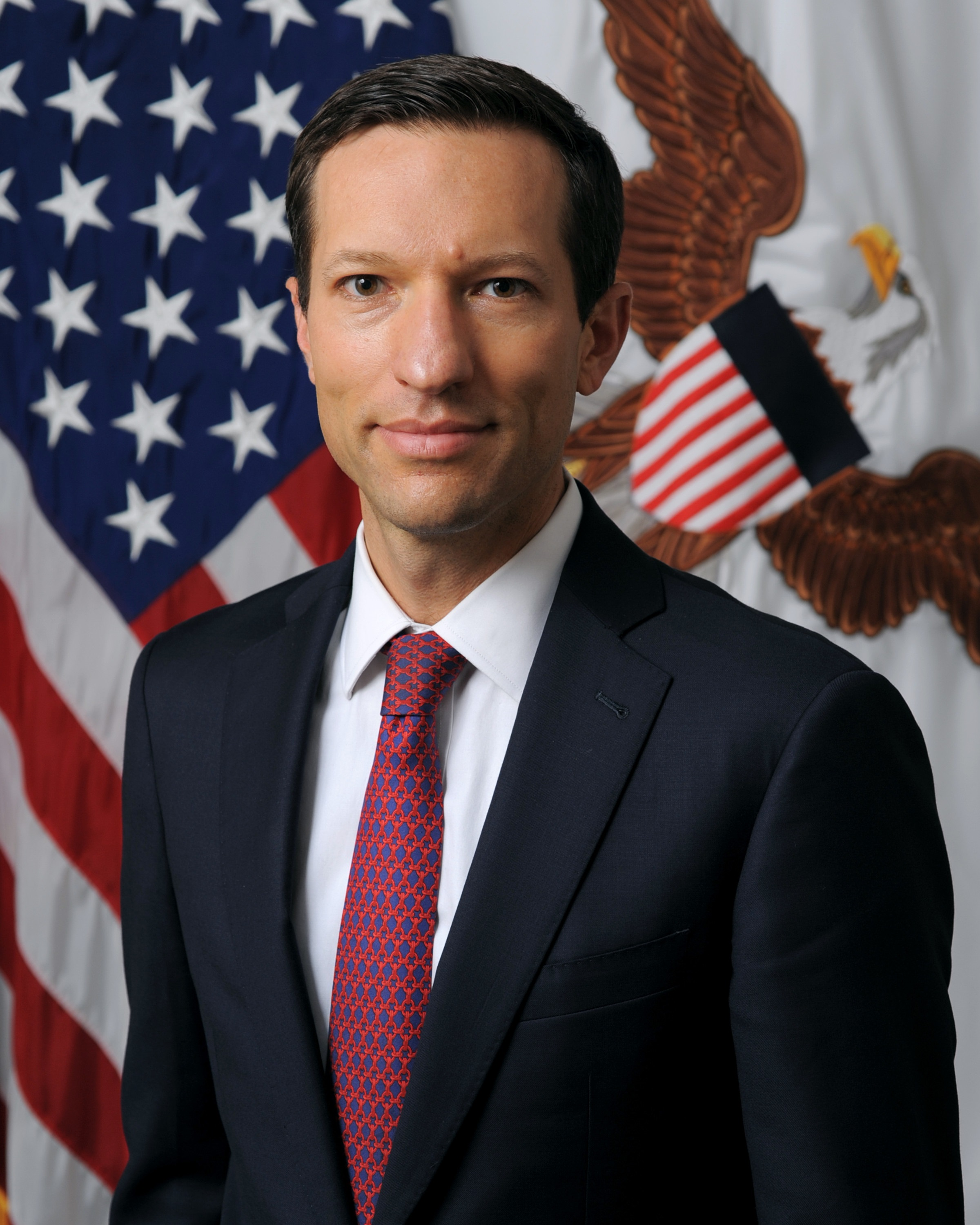

Assistant Secretary of Defense for Indo-Pacific Security Affairs
- In office July 25, 2021 – January 20, 2025
- President: Joe Biden
- Preceded by: Randall Schriver
- Succeeded by: John Noh

Personal details
- Spouse: Jennifer Yang (m. 2009)
- Education: Princeton University (BA); University of California, Berkeley (PhD)

Ely Stefansky Ratner (born 1977) is an American political scientist who had served as Assistant Secretary of Defense for Indo-Pacific Security Affairs in the Biden administration.

== Early life and education ==
Ratner graduated with an A.B. from the Princeton School of Public and International Affairs in 1998 after completing a 115-page-long senior thesis, titled "Peace, Security, and Realpolitik: A Theoretical Analysis of the Effort to Expand the United Nations Security Council," under the supervision of Kathleen R. McNamara. He later received a Ph.D. in political science from the University of California, Berkeley.

== Career ==
In 2002 and 2003, Ratner was a staffer to the United States Senate Committee on Foreign Relations, under then-Chairman Joe Biden. He was an associate political scientist at the RAND Corporation from 2009 to 2011. Ratner then joined the United States Department of State as a China desk officer. From 2015 to 2017, Ratner served as deputy national security advisor to then Vice President Joe Biden. After the end of the Obama administration, Ratner became Maurice R. Greenberg Chair in China Studies at the Council on Foreign Relations 2017-2018. He was also executive vice president and director of studies at the Center for a New American Security.

=== DoD Nomination ===
On April 21, 2021, Ratner was nominated by President Joe Biden to be an Assistant Secretary of Defense for Indo-Pacific Security Affairs under Secretary Lloyd Austin. The Senate Armed Services Committee held hearings on Ratner's nomination on June 16, 2021. The committee favorably reported Ratner's nomination to the Senate floor on June 22, 2021. A month later, on July 22, 2021, the full Senate confirmed Ratner by voice vote.

He was sworn in to the new position by Lloyd Austin on July 25, 2021.

== Publications ==
=== Articles ===
- The China Reckoning: How Beijing Defied American Expectations, Foreign Affairs, April 2018 (co-authored with Kurt M. Campbell)

== Personal life ==
Ratner and his wife, Jennifer Yang, married in 2009.
