= Defending Elections from Threats by Establishing Redlines Act =

The Defending Elections from Threats by Establishing Redlines Act, known by the acronym DETER, aims to impose sanctions, including new blocking and secondary sanctions, on foreign (primarily, Russian) governments and persons that interfere in any U.S. federal election.

== History of bills ==
Congress	Short title	Bill number(s)	Date introduced	Sponsor(s)	# of cosponsors	Latest status
115th Congress	Defending Elections from Threats by Establishing Redlines Act of 2018	S. 2313	January 16, 2018	Chris Van Hollen (D-MD)	17	Died in Committee
115th Congress	Defending Elections from Threats by Establishing Redlines Act of 2018	H.R. 4884	January 25, 2018	Ileana Ros-Lehtinen (R-FL)	25	Died in Committee
116th Congress	Defending Elections from Threats by Establishing Redlines Act of 2019	S. 1060	April 8, 2019	Chris Van Hollen (D-MD)	11	Died in Committee
116th Congress	Defending Elections from Threats by Establishing Redlines Act of 2020	H.R. 8463	September 30, 2020	Brad Schneider (D-IL)	3	Died in Committee

== See also ==
- Countering America's Adversaries Through Sanctions Act (CAATSA)
- Defending American Security from Kremlin Aggression Act (DASKA)
