= Strategic Insights =

Monthly electronic journal

Strategic Insights was a monthly electronic journal produced by the Center for Contemporary Conflict at the Naval Postgraduate School in Monterey, California.

== History ==
The first volume was Volume I, Issue 1 (March 2002). Strategic Insights folded in 2011. A complete archive of the journal is available on the World Wide Web at the website of the Center for Contemporary Conflict.
