= Randall Schriver =

American government official (born 1967)

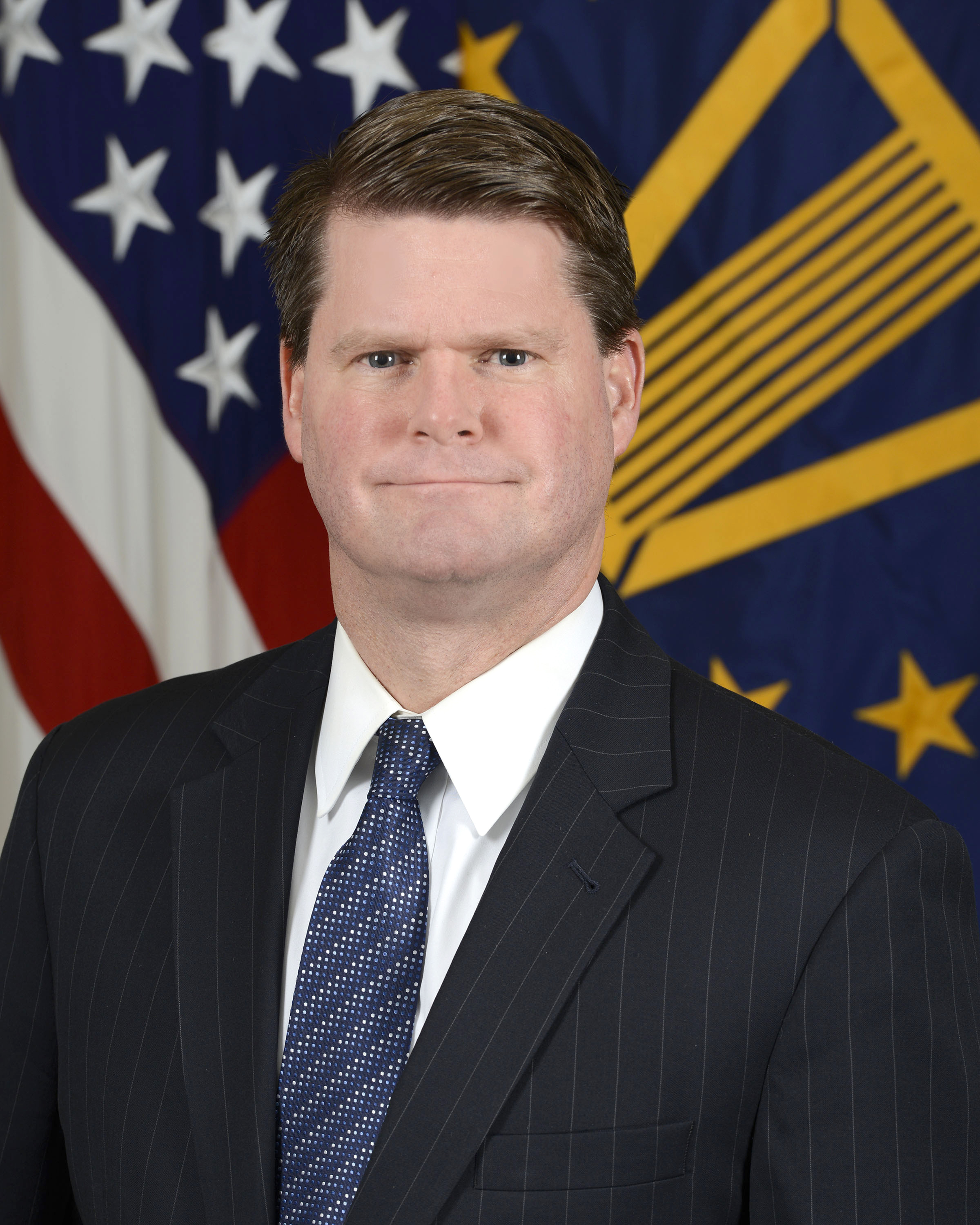
- Official portrait, 2018

Assistant Secretary of Defense for Indo-Pacific Security Affairs
- In office December 29, 2017 – December 31, 2019
- President: Donald Trump
- Preceded by: David B. Shear
- Succeeded by: Ely Ratner

Deputy Assistant Secretary of State for East Asia
- In office January 2003 – May 2005
- President: George W. Bush

Chief of Staff to the Deputy Secretary of State
- In office January 2001 – December 2003
- President: George W. Bush

Personal details
- Born: 1967 (age 58–59)
- Education: Williams College; Stanford University; Harvard Kennedy School
- Occupation: Founding partner at Armitage International, L.C; Chairman of Project 2049 Institute

Chinese name
- Traditional Chinese: 薛瑞福
- Simplified Chinese: 薛瑞福
Transcriptions
Standard Mandarin
- Hanyu Pinyin: Xuē Ruìfú

Randall G. Schriver (born 1967), also known as Randy Schriver, is the Chairman of the Project 2049 Institute, and previously served as Assistant Secretary of Defense for Indo-Pacific Security Affairs in the United States government. He concurrently holds positions as a Commissioner on the United States–China Economic and Security Review Commission, and a partner at Pacific Solutions. Previously, Schriver served as Deputy Assistant Secretary of State for East Asian and Pacific Affairs and was a founding partner of Armitage International.

== Biography ==
Schriver received a Bachelor of Arts degree in history from Williams College and a Master of Arts degree from Harvard University. From 1994 to 1998, Schriver worked in the Office of the Secretary of Defense, including as the senior official responsible for the day-to-day management of U.S. bilateral relations with the People's Liberation Army and the bilateral security and military relationships with Taiwan. Prior to his civilian service, he served as an active duty Navy Intelligence Officer from 1989 to 1991, including a deployment in support of Operation Desert Shield/Desert Storm. After active duty, he served in the Navy Reserves for nine years, including as Special Assistant to the Chairman of the Joint Chiefs of Staff and an attaché at U.S. Embassy Beijing and U.S. Embassy Ulaanbaatar. From 2001 to 2003, he served as Chief of Staff and Senior Policy Advisor to the Deputy Secretary of State, Richard Armitage.

Schriver co-founded the Project 2049 Institute in 2008. Various media outlets have described him as a critic of the Chinese government and the Chinese Communist Party as well as a supporter of Taiwan.

Schriver was nominated by president Donald Trump, confirmed by the Senate on December 20, 2017, and sworn in on January 8, 2018. On December 12, 2019, it was announced that he would be resigning from his position at the Department of Defense.

== Awards ==
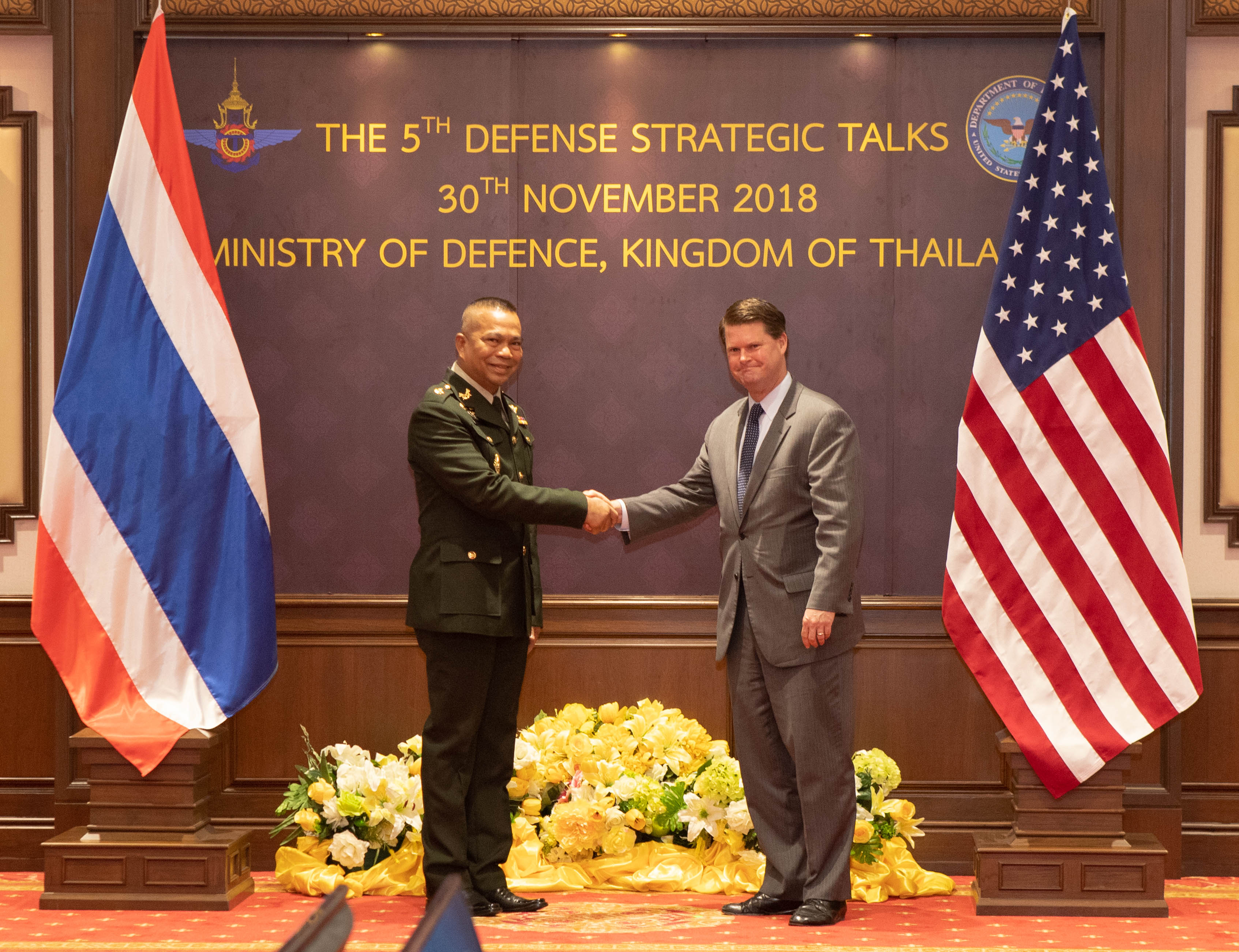
U.S. Assistant Secretary of Defense Schriver visits Thailand

On July 12, 2005, Schriver was awarded the Order of the Brilliant Star with Violet Grand Cordon, by then-President of the Republic of China (Taiwan) Chen Shui-bian.

Schriver has been awarded the Department of Defense Medal for Distinguished Public Service, the highest civilian award presented by the U.S. Secretary of Defense.
