= David B. Shear =

American diplomat (born 1954)

David Bruce Shear
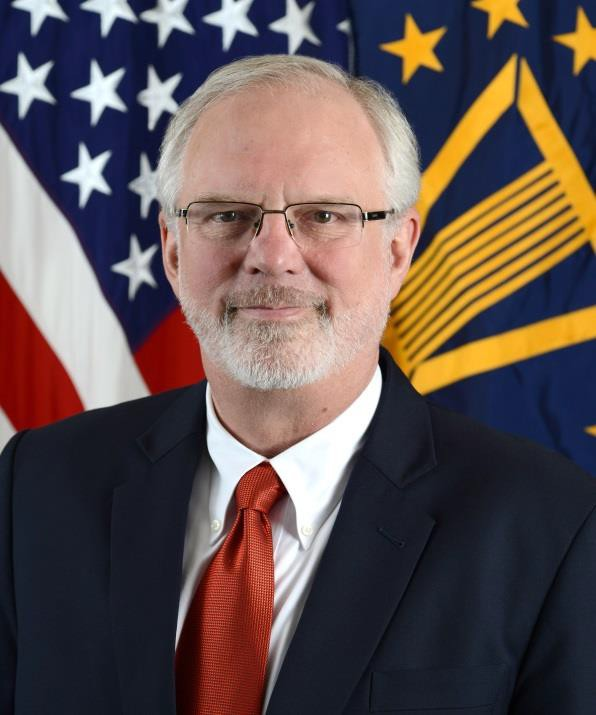

Principal Deputy Under Secretary of Defense for Policy (acting)
- In office June 10, 2016 – January 20, 2017
- President: Barack Obama
- Preceded by: Brian P. McKeon
- Succeeded by: David Trachtenberg

Assistant Secretary of Defense for Asian and Pacific Security Affairs
- In office July 17, 2014 – June 10, 2016
- President: Barack Obama
- Deputy: Claire A. Pierangelo
- Preceded by: Mark W. Lippert
- Succeeded by: Randall Schriver

United States Ambassador to Vietnam
- In office August 4, 2011 – August 8, 2014
- President: Barack Obama
- Preceded by: Virginia E. Palmer
- Succeeded by: Ted Osius

Personal details
- Born: May 24, 1954 (age 72) Cobleskill, New York
- Education: Earlham College (BA); Johns Hopkins School of Advanced International Studies (MA)

David Bruce Shear (born May 25, 1954) is an American diplomat who was a career Foreign Service Officer. Shear served as the Assistant Secretary of Defense for Asian and Pacific Security Affairs from July 2014 to June 2016. Prior to his nomination for this position, he served as United States Ambassador to Vietnam. He was also formerly deputy assistant secretary for East Asian and Pacific affairs at the U.S. Department of State; he joined the State Department in 1982 and has served in Washington, Sapporo, Beijing, Kuala Lumpur and Tokyo.

Born in Cobleskill, New York, Shear attended Clayton A. Bouton High School, graduating in 1971. He is a graduate of Earlham College with a B.A. degree in 1975. Shear also has a M.A. degree in international affairs from the Johns Hopkins School of Advanced International Studies in 1982, and was a Rusk Fellow at Georgetown University's Institute for the Study of Diplomacy. He served as United States Ambassador to Vietnam from 2011 until leaving office in 2014.

== Personal life ==
Shear is a black belt in kendo. He and his wife Barbara have a daughter. He speaks Chinese and Japanese.
