= Center on Contemporary Conflict =

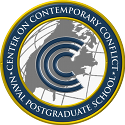
- Type: Graduate school
- Established: 2001
- Location: Monterey, California, USA
- Website: http://www.nps.edu/ccc/

The Center on Contemporary Conflict (CCC) is the primary research wing of the Naval Postgraduate School's Department of National Security Affairs. The CCC conducts research on current and emerging national security threats, sharing its findings with United States and allied military and civilian decision makers.

== Research ==
The Center on Contemporary Conflict broadly addresses several areas of national security research providing research and analysis to decision makers in the Department of Defense community. Among these areas are resource scarcity and conflict, proliferation and deterrence, innovation and terrorism, U.S. strategy, non-state actors and violence, state failure and governance, and regional security and alliances. Research at CCC is sponsored by various federal agencies, including the Defense Threat Reduction Agency, the Department of Energy National Nuclear Security Administration, the National Intelligence Council, the Office of the Director of National Intelligence, the Office of the Secretary of Defense, the U.S. Pacific Command, and the U.S. Southern Command.

The CCC also manages programs and facilitates federal sponsorships for other private institutions, in addition to executing federally sponsored research.

== Strategic Insights ==
The Center on Contemporary Conflict previously published the academic journal Strategic Insights. This journal published from 2002 to 2011, is on hiatus pending new funding.
