= James J. Shinn =

American entrepreneur, scholar and former government official

James Joseph Shinn
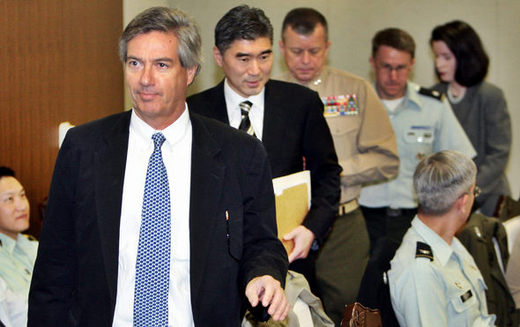
- Shinn (front) leading the US Delegation to US-South Korean Defense Meetings on 8 April 2008 in Seoul, Korea
- Born: October 22, 1951 (age 74); Mount Holly, New Jersey, U.S.

Academic background
- Education: Princeton University (BA, PhD); Harvard Business School (MBA)

James Joseph Shinn (born October 22, 1951) is an entrepreneur, scholar, and former U.S. government official.

== Education ==
Born in Mount Holly, New Jersey, Shinn earned his BA degree from Princeton University in 1973, followed by an MBA at Harvard in 1981. He returned to complete his PhD at Princeton in 2001.

== Career ==
=== Business career ===
Shinn worked as a second vice president at the Chase Manhattan Bank starting in 1974, in New York, Tokyo and Hong Kong; Chase was acquired by J.P. Morgan in 2000.

Shinn began in Silicon Valley at Advanced Micro Devices (AMD), a Sunnyvale, California–based semiconductor firm, including roles as product market engineer in the MOS Microprocessor Group, where he worked on the x86 architecture; district sales manager in New York/New Jersey; and then General Manager of Nihon AMD in Japan.

He then co-founded Dialogic, a telecommunications voice processing firm using digital signal processing (DSP) technology, with Nick Zwick, Ken Burkhardt, and Charles Walden, in 1983. Dialogic did an IPO in 1992 and was acquired by Intel in 1999, becoming Intel's Media and Signaling division.

After Dialogic he was an investor and advisor to technology start-ups including Haystack Labs, a cyber security start-up founded by Steven Smaha in 1989, focused on UNIX-based intrusion detection systems, acquired by Trusted Information Systems in 1997; Longitude, a derivatives trading platform founded by Andrew Lawrence and Charles Walden in 1999, acquired by the ISE and Goldman Sachs in 2006; Modo Labs, an enterprise mobile engagement platform founded by Andrew Yu and a team from MIT in 2010; and Kenshō Financial, a fintech data analytics firm founded by Daniel Nadler and a team from Harvard in 2013, acquired by S&P Global in 2018. Shinn co-founded Predata, a New York– and Washington-based data analytics firm with applications in national security and information operations, with Andrew Choi, Collin Stedman, Hill Wyrough, John Alfieri, and Joshua Haecker, in 2015. Predata was acquired by FiscalNote in 2021.

In financial markets, he co-founded Teneo Intelligence, a New York– and London-based geopolitical risk advisory group, with Kevin Kajiwara and Wolfango Piccoli, in 2012. He served as a non-executive director on the supervisory board of CQS, Ltd, a London-based multi-strategy hedge fund founded by Michael Hintze in 1999.

He was an investor and advisor to Red Six, a Maryland- and Washington DC–based firm specializing in unmanned aerial systems (UAS) threat analysis, emulation, and protection, co-founded by Scott Crino and Andy Dreby in 2012; Red Six was acquired by Systems Planning and Analysis in June 2025; KMB Telematics, a software-controlled RADAR firm founded by Bryan Cattle; and OMX Ventures, an Illinois-based biotechnology venture capital firm, founded by Craig Asher. In 2021 he joined Criteo S.A. as an advisor on digital currency solutions, and in 2022 joined the board of directors of Bitt, Inc. In 2022 he was the first investor in SeekAI, a New York-based generative AI company founded by Sarah Nagy and joined the SeekAI board of directors; IBM acquired Seek in June 2025 to serve as the basis for IBM's watsonx AI labs. In 2025 he became an advisor to Conversion Capital, a venture fund founded by Christian Lawless; and an advisor to Cognition Labs, creator of the Devin software coding agent, co-founded by Scott Wu, Walden Yan, Steven Hao, and Russell Kaplan. In 2025 he joined Preseen, a predictive analytics platform co-founded by Veniamin Veselovsky and Theodore Summer, as investor, board member, and Managing Director.

=== U.S. Government career ===
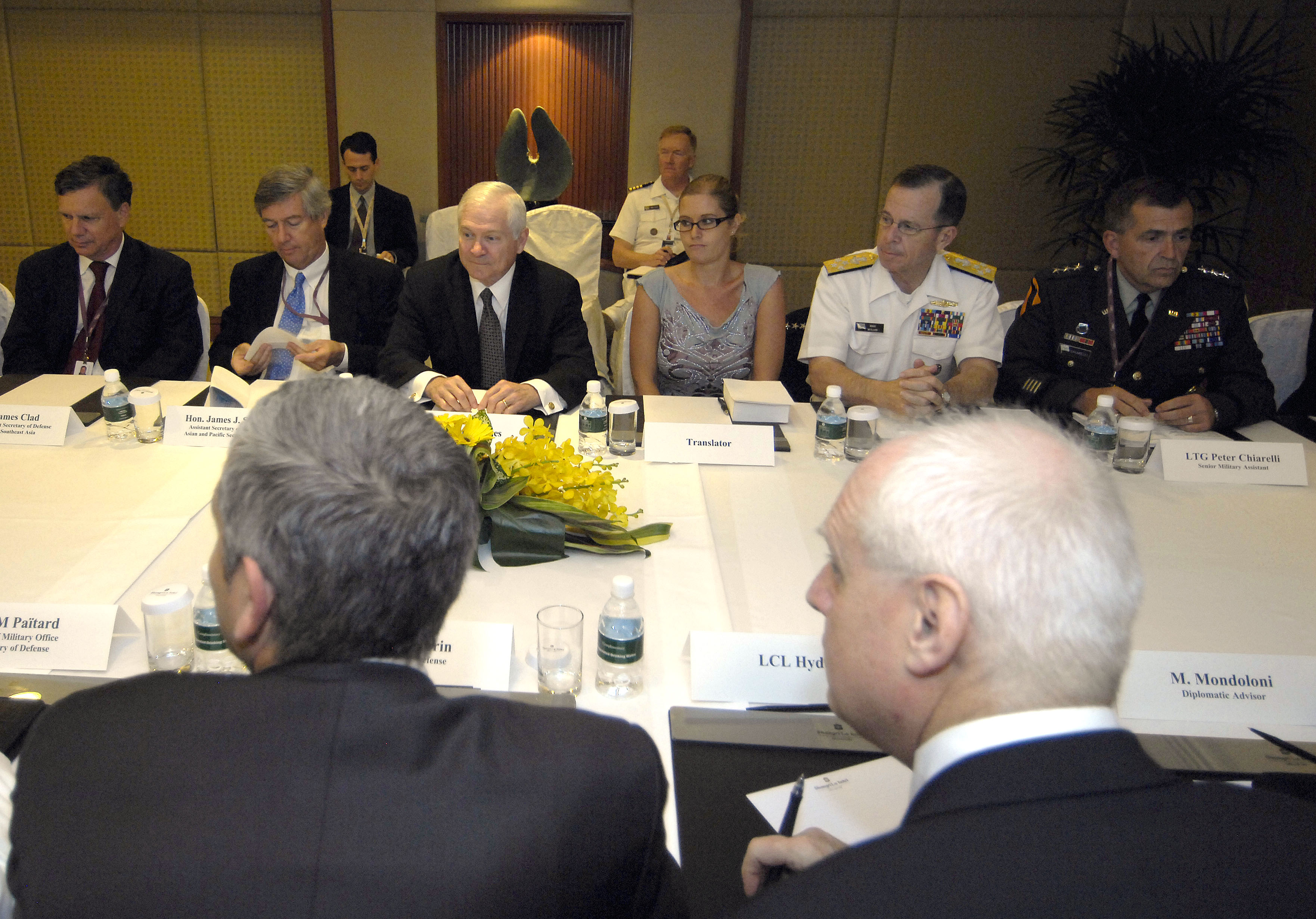
James J. Shinn seated to the right of Robert Gates

Shinn began government service as an economic analyst in the State Department's Bureau of East Asian and Pacific Affairs in 1977, serving under Assistant Secretary Richard Holbrooke, working primarily on U.S.-Japan economic relations, including industrial structure policy, and the Tokyo Round of the Multilateral Trade Negotiations (MTN).

In 2002 to 2003 Shinn served as Public Delegate to the General Assembly of the United Nations. From 2003 until 2006, Shinn was the National Intelligence Officer (NIO) for East Asia at the Central Intelligence Agency and at the Office of the Director of National Intelligence (ODNI). In 2007 he was confirmed by the U.S. Senate as Assistant Secretary of Defense for Asia, serving under Secretary Robert Gates. He participated in policy-making with regard to the wars in Afghanistan and Pakistan, and was awarded the Distinguished Public Service medal.

In 2020 Shinn rejoined the State Department as Senior Advisor to the Bureau for Economic Growth, Energy and the Environment, serving with Undersecretary Keith Krach, working on technology policy vis-a-vis the PRC.

=== Academic career ===
He was Senior Fellow for Asia at the Council on Foreign Relations from 1993 to 1996, where he authored several task force reports and books, including Riding the Tigers: American Commercial Diplomacy in Asia (1998), with Jeffrey Garten and Robert Zoellick; The Tests of War and the Strains of Peace: The U.S.-Japan Security Relationship (1998), with Harold Brown and Richard Armitage; Fires Across the Water: Transnational Problems in Asia (1998); and Weaving the Net: Conditional Engagement with China (1996).

Shinn worked with Jan Lodal at the Council on Foreign Relations on "Red-Teaming the Data Gap" (2002). His other books include Afghan Peace Talks: A Primer (RAND Press, 2011), with James Dobbins, outlining the roadmap for a settlement of the War in Afghanistan; Political Power and Corporate Control: the New Global Politics of Corporate Governance (Princeton University Press, 2005), with Peter Gourevitch; and "How Shareholder Reforms Can Pay Foreign Policy Dividends, also with Peter Gourevitch.

He was Visiting Lecturer at Princeton University's School of Engineering and Applied Science from 2009 to 2016, where he taught a course on technical innovation, EGR 492, “Radical Innovation in Global Markets.”

=== Philanthropy ===
Shinn served on the advisory board of the Department of Ophthalmology at New York-Presbyterian Columbia University Medical Center; provided seed capital for the formation of Princeton's Scholars in the Nation's Service (SINSI) program; and as a donor to the Asia Foundation, for its programs empowering women in developing countries in Asia and the Library Company of Burlington – chartered by George II in 1758.
