= Longitude LLC =

US pool betting technology platform

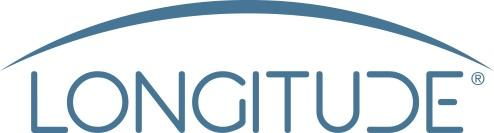
- Type: Private
- Industry: Financial/Gambling Technology
- Founded: 1999; 27 years ago in New York, US
- Key people: Scott Shechtman, CFA – President; Rich Wieszczek – Head of Technology
- Website: www.longitude.com

Longitude LLC is the inventor and distributor of the Longitude Enhanced Pari-Mutuel System™, a pool betting technology platform.

== Pari-Mutuel Wagering ==
The Longitude Enhanced Pari-Mutuel System enables sports betting and race track operators to offer a wider range of bet types, a richer display of odds data and bigger pools with more stable odds. By allowing a range of different types of wagers on an individual race or sporting event to be aggregated into merged pools, the Longitude Enhanced Pari-Mutuel System makes more efficient use of existing liquidity. Current customers utilizing the Longitude Enhanced Pari-Mutuel System include The Hong Kong Jockey Club, Tabcorp and The Football Pools.

== Financial Markets ==
The globally patented Longitude Enhanced Pari-Mutuel System has its roots in the financial markets, where it has been used for the pricing and settlement of markets on a range of financial and naturally occurring events, such as credit, economic statistics, and weather. Longitude LLC, a wholly owned subsidiaries of Nasdaq, is currently based in New York to further explore a number of financial markets applications.

== History ==
Longitude was founded in New York in 1999.

In 2006, ISE and Goldman Sachs jointly acquired all of the Longitude assets to conduct auctions on economic data options in partnership with the Chicago Mercantile Exchange (CME) and energy storage statistics in partnership with the New York Mercantile Exchange.

In 2007, ISE purchased Goldman’s entire stake and Longitude became a wholly owned subsidiary of ISE.

In 2010 and 2011, the Longitude platform was reengineered to serve as a backend calculation engine for the sports betting and horse race wagering industries.

In 2012, Sportech and Longitude sign a partnership to add depth to betting products.

In 2013, The Hong Kong Jockey Club announces signing of strategic technology services agreement with Longitude.

In 2014, Longitude Expands Relationship with Hong Kong Jockey Club.

In 2016, Tabcorp and Longitude Announce Strategic Technology Initiative.

In 2016, Longitude was acquired by Nasdaq to further explore a number of financial markets applications for the Enhanced Pari-Mutuel System.

== See also ==
- Parimutuel betting
- Sports betting
- Horse racing
