= Wallace C. Gregson =

American general and policy writer (b. 1946)

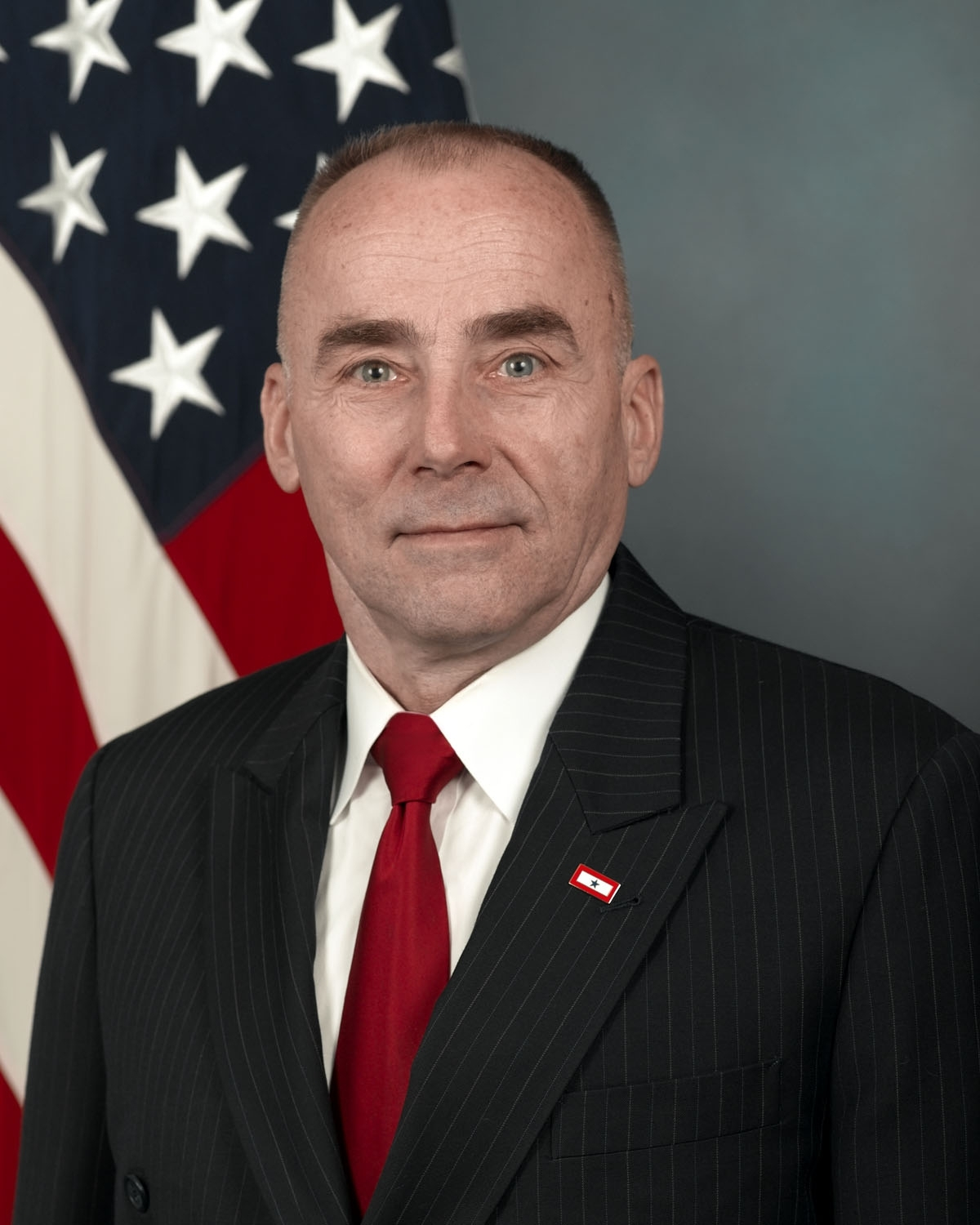
- Official portrait

Assistant Secretary of Defense for Asian and Pacific Security Affairs
- In office May 13, 2009 – April 1, 2011
- President: Barack Obama
- Preceded by: Derek J. Mitchell (acting)
- Succeeded by: Derek J. Mitchell (acting)

Personal details
- Born: March 31, 1946 (age 80) Pittsburgh, Pennsylvania, U.S.
- Education: United States Naval Academy; Salve Regina University; Naval War College

Military service
- Branch/service: United States Marine Corps
- Years of service: 1968–2005
- Rank: Lieutenant General
- Commands: U.S. Marine Corps Forces, Pacific; III Marine Expeditionary Force; 7th Marine Regiment; 1st Battalion, 5th Marines
- Battles/wars: Vietnam War; Operation Restore Hope
- Awards: Defense Meritorious Service Medal; Legion of Merit (3); Bronze Star Medal with Combat "V"; Purple Heart

Wallace "Chip" Gregson Jr. (born March 31, 1946) is an American foreign policy writer and retired lieutenant general. He was the assistant defense secretary for Asian and Pacific Security Affairs from 2009 to 2011. His last post before retiring from the military was as commander, United States Marine Corps Forces, Pacific; and commanding general, Fleet Marine Force, Pacific; from 2003 to 2005.

Gregson graduated from the United States Naval Academy and received his commission in the United States Marine Corps in 1968. He also holds master's degrees from the Naval War College and the Salve Regina College. Gregson was deployed during the Vietnam War. His notable commands included the 1st Battalion, 5th Marines; the 7th Marine Regiment; and III Marine Expeditionary Force.

== Early life and education ==
Gregson was born on March 31, 1946, in Pittsburgh, Pennsylvania. He is a 1964 graduate of Valley Forge Military Academy and a 1968 graduate of the United States Naval Academy.

Civilian education includes a bachelor's degree from the U.S. Naval Academy, master's degrees in strategic planning from the Naval War College and international relations from Salve Regina College. Professional military education assignments after the Basic School included the U.S. Army Infantry Officers Advanced Course, Marine Corps Command and Staff College, the Naval War College, and a tour as a Military Fellow with the Council on Foreign Relations. He is a distinguished graduate of the Infantry Officers Advanced Course and the Naval War College.

== Marine Corps career ==
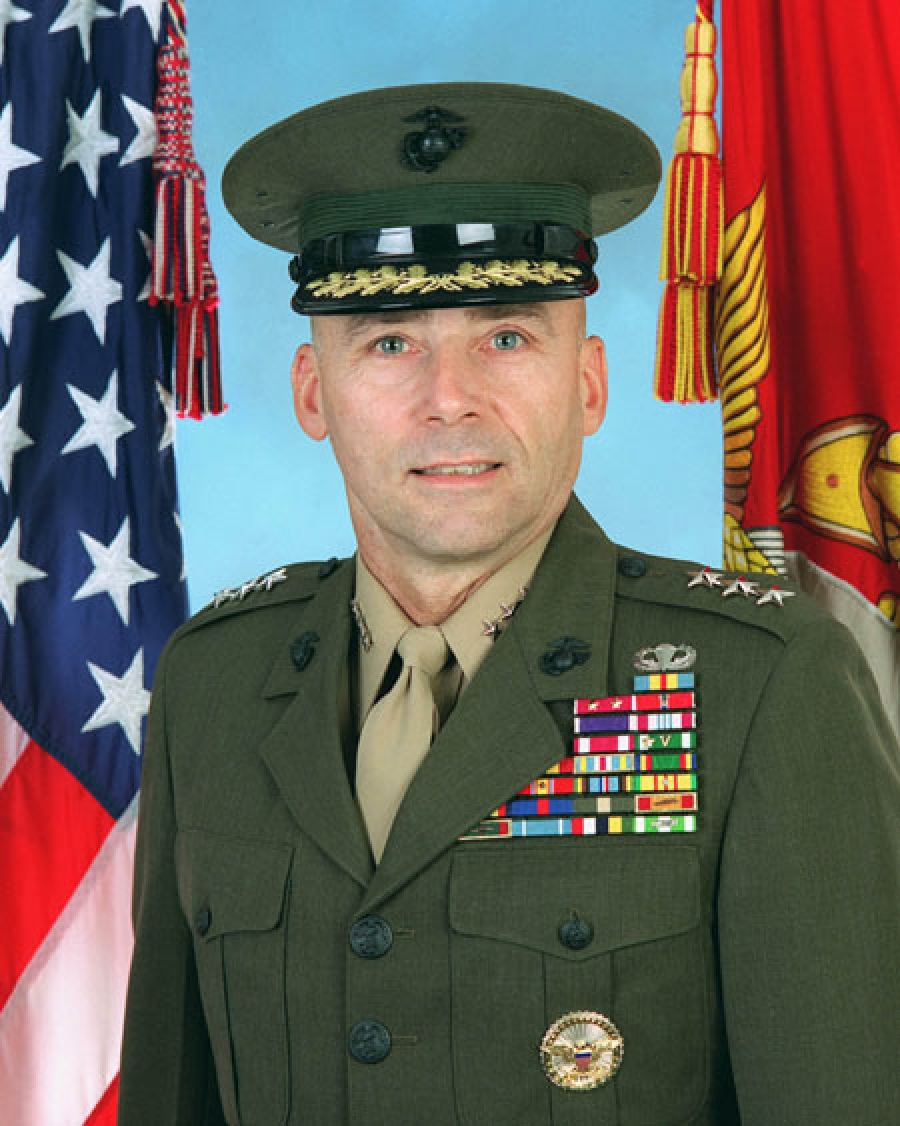
LtGen Wallace Gregson in 2003

After the Basic School, he served with the 1st Reconnaissance Battalion, 1st Marine Division, in the Republic of Vietnam from February 1969 to August 1970. Operational assignments included infantry battalion executive officer, division staff duty, headquarters battalion executive officer, operations officer (G-3) of I Marine Expeditionary Force, and assistant operations officer (J-3A) of Unified Task Force Somalia during Operation Restore Hope. He has commanded an infantry company; Headquarters Battalion, 1st Marine Division; 1st Battalion, 5th Marines; and 7th Marine Regiment.

Supporting establishment duties included S-4 of a recruit training battalion, aide-de-camp, recruit training company commander, recruiting station executive officer, company commander of a combined platoon leader's class, and operations officer for a recruiting district. Marine Corps Headquarters duties included program development officer, coordinator for roles and missions, and Assistant Deputy Commandant for Plans. External duties include military observer with the United Nations Truce Supervision Organization in Egypt, Deputy for Marine Corps Matters in the Secretary of the Navy's Office of Program Appraisal, and Executive/Military Assistant to the Director of Central Intelligence. In his last Washington assignment, he served as Director, Asia and Pacific Affairs, in the Office of the Under Secretary of Defense for Policy, from 1998 to 2000.

From 2001 to 2003, Gregson was the commanding general, III Marine Expeditionary Force; commander, Marine Corps Bases, Japan; and commander, Marine Corps Forces, Japan. From 2003 to 2005, he was the commander, United States Marine Corps Forces, Pacific; commanding general, Fleet Marine Force, Pacific; and commander, United States Marine Corps Forces Central Command.

== Later career ==
After retiring from the military in 2005, he worked as an independent consultant and was the chief operating officer of the U.S. Olympic Committee, before entering the government. During the first Obama administration, Gregson was appointed as assistant defense secretary for Asian and Pacific Security Affairs in May 2009. The position's area of responsibility included large parts of Asia, but his focus was on Northeast Asia. He resigned and left his position in April 2011.

Gregson is also a member of the Council on Foreign Relations, the United States Naval Institute, and the Marine Corps Association.

== Awards and decorations ==
His decorations include the Defense Meritorious Service Medal, three awards of the Legion of Merit, the Bronze Star Medal with Combat "V", and the Purple Heart. Foreign awards include the Japanese Order of the Rising Sun, the South Korean Order of National Security Merit, and the Taiwanese Order of Brilliant Star.

Military offices
Preceded by Earl B. Hailston	Commander of the III Marine Expeditionary Force; 2001–2003	Succeeded by Joseph F. Weber
Preceded by Earl B. Hailston	Commander of the United States Marine Corps Forces, Pacific; Commanding General of the Fleet Marine Force, Pacific; 2003–2005	Succeeded by John F. Goodman
Political offices
Preceded by Derek J. Mitchell; Acting	Assistant Secretary of Defense for Asian and Pacific Security Affairs; 2009–2011	Succeeded by Derek J. Mitchell; Acting
