= List of Georgetown University alumni =

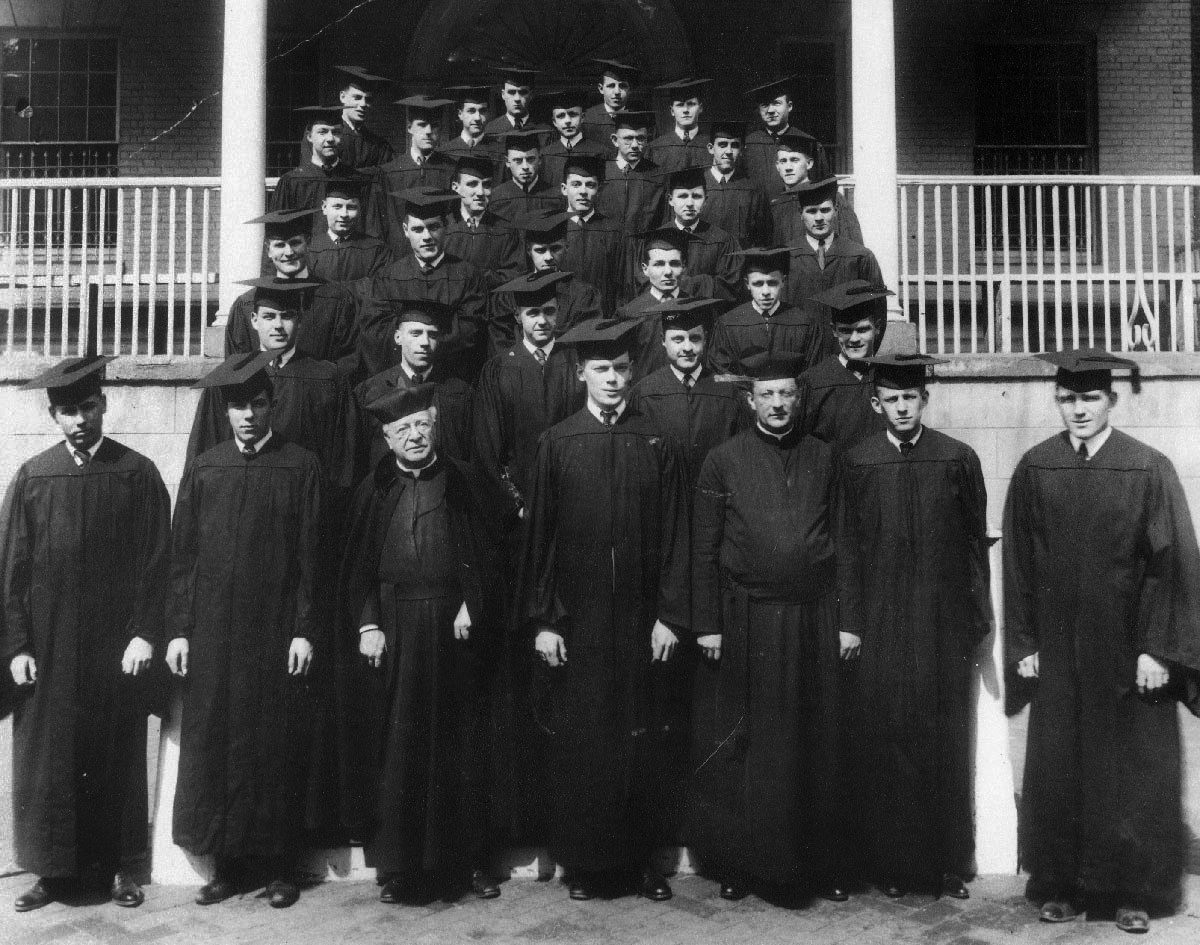
The Georgetown College class of 1920 assembled on the steps of the Old North Building

Georgetown University is a private research university located in Washington, D.C. Founded in 1789, Georgetown University is the oldest Catholic and Jesuit institution of higher education in the United States. The school graduates about two thousand undergraduate and postgraduate students annually. There are nine constitutive schools, five of which offer undergraduate degrees and six of which offer graduate degrees, as two schools offer both undergraduate and graduate degrees.

== Legend ==
Note: Individuals who may belong in multiple sections appear only in one. An empty class year or school/degree box indicates that the information is unknown.
* Indicates the alumnus or alumna attended but did not graduate (includes years of attendance)

- Col – College of Arts & Sciences

- SLL – former School of Languages and Linguistics, now the Faculty of Languages and Linguistics within the College of Arts & Sciences

- Dent – School of Dentistry (defunct)
- GAI – Government Affairs Institute
- Grad – Graduate School of Arts and Sciences
- Law – Law Center (Juris Doctor or Bachelor of Laws)

- LL.M. – Master of Laws

- Med – School of Medicine

- R – Medical residency in the School of Medicine
- W – Fellowship in the School of Medicine

- MSB – McDonough School of Business (undergraduate)

- GSB – former Georgetown School of Business
- SBA – former School of Business Administration
- MBA – Master of Business Administration (graduate)

- NHS – School of Nursing and Health Studies

- Nur – former Georgetown University Nursing School

- MPP – McCourt School of Public Policy

- GPPI – former Georgetown Public Policy Institute

- SCS – School of Continuing Studies

- SCE – former School of Summer and Continuing Education
- CED – School of Continuing Education

- SFS – Edmund A. Walsh School of Foreign Service (undergraduate)

- MSFS – Master of Science in Foreign Service (graduate)
- SSP – Security Studies Program (graduate)

== Academia ==
=== College and university presidents ===
Name	Class year	School/ degree	Notability	Reference
Carmen Twillie Ambar	1989	SFS	President of Oberlin College, 2017–present; president of Cedar Crest College, 2008–2017	
Robert L. Barchi	1967, 1970	SFS, Law	President of Rutgers University, 2012–2020; president of Thomas Jefferson University, 2004–12; provost of the University of Pennsylvania, 1998–2004	
Rev. Lawrence Biondi	1976	Col	President of Saint Louis University, 1987–2013	
Rev. Thomas Curran	1979	MSB	President of Rockhurst University, 2006–present	
John J. DeGioia	1980, 1994	Grad, Col	President of Georgetown University, 2001–2024	
Rev. Thomas R. Fitzgerald	1938–1939*	Col	President of Fairfield University, 1973–79; president of Saint Louis University, 1979–87	
Edward T. Foote II		Law	President of the University of Miami, 1981–2001; dean of Washington University School of Law, 1973–1980	
Allison Garrett	1992	LL.M.	Chancellor of Oklahoma State Regents for Higher Education, 2021–present; former president of Emporia State University, 2016–2021; former Walmart vice president/legal counsel	
Lee Roberts	1994	Law	Chancellor of University of North Carolina at Chapel Hill, 2024–present	
Susan Hockfield	1979	Grad	16th president of the Massachusetts Institute of Technology, 2004–12; provost of Yale University, 2002–2004; dean of Yale Graduate School of Arts and Sciences, 1998–2002	
George R. Houston Jr.	1961	MSB	President of Mount St. Mary's University, 1994–2003	
Rev. Brian F. Linnane	1981	Grad	President of Loyola University Maryland, 2005–present	
Jim Lucchese	2005	Law	President of Berklee College of Music, 2025–present	
Very Rev. William Matthews	1790s	Col	President of Georgetown College, 1809; vicar general of the Diocese of Philadelphia	
Rev. Kevin F. O'Brien	1988	Col	President of Santa Clara University, 2019–present	
Rev. Leo J. O'Donovan	1956	Col	President of Georgetown University, 1989–2001	
Rev. Scott R. Pilarz	1981	Col	President of Marquette University, 2011–13; president of the University of Scranton, 2003–11, 2018–present	
Rev. John Pinasco	1868–1872*		President of the University of San Francisco, 1876–80; president of Santa Clara College, 1880–83, 1888–93	
Daniel R. Porterfield	1983	Col	President of Franklin & Marshall College, 2011–2018	
A. Kenneth Pye	1954, 1955	Law, LL.M.	President of Southern Methodist University, 1987–94	
Kathleen Ross	1971	Grad	President of Heritage University; MacArthur Fellow	
Debora L. Spar	1984	SFS	Senior associate dean of Harvard Business School Online; president of Barnard College, 2008–2017	
Kent Syverud	1977	SFS	Chancellor and president of Syracuse University, 2014–present; dean of Washington University School of Law, 2005–2013; dean of Vanderbilt University Law School, 1997–2005	
B. Joseph White	1969	SFS	President of the University of Illinois at Urbana–Champaign, 2005–09	

=== Faculty ===
Name	Class year	School/ degree	Notability	Reference
Anthony Clark Arend	1980	SFS	Professor of government and foreign service at Georgetown University; senior associate dean for Graduate and Faculty Affairs of the Walsh School of Foreign Service; director of the Master of Science in Foreign Service Program	
Ian C. Ballon	1998	LL.M.	Professor of law at Stanford Law School; executive director of the Center for E-Commerce	
Robert J. Cottrol		Law	Professor of law at George Washington University Law School; legal historian	
Nora Demleitner	1994	LL.M.	Dean of Washington and Lee University School of Law, 2012–15; dean of Hofstra University School of Law, 2007–12; Roy L. Steinheimer Jr. Professor of Law at Washington and Lee University School of Law	
Noura Erakat	2012	LL.M.	Assistant professor of law at George Mason University School of Law, co-editor of Jadaliyya, prior Freedman Teaching Fellow at Temple University Beasley School of Law	
Alan Gallay	1986	Ph.D.	Professor and Lyndon B. Johnson Chair of U.S. History, Texas Christian University	
Carol Hurd Green	1960	MA	Scholar, author, and editor at Boston College; director of the Donovan Urban Teaching Scholars Program in the Lynch School of Education; member of the faculty and former associate dean of the College of Art and Sciences	
Thomas J. Healey	1964	Col	Senior fellow at the Harvard Kennedy School	
Nancy Hubbard	1985	MSB	Professor of business, author, and dean of the University of Lynchburg College of Business	
Darnell Hunt	1988	MBA	Professor of Sociology and African American Studies, dean of Social Sciences at UCLA	
David P. Long	1997	Col	Dean of the School of Professional Studies and director of the Institute for Policy Research and Catholic Studies at The Catholic University of America; canon lawyer	
Edward F. Sherman	1959	Col	Dean and W.R. Irby Chair in Law at Tulane University Law School	
Michael Slobodchikoff	1997	Col	Professor of Political Science and director of the Center for Eastern and Central European, Russian, and Eurasian Studies, Troy University	
David Vladeck	1977	LL.M.	Professor of law and co-director of the Institute for Public Representation at Georgetown University Law Center; director of the Bureau of Consumer Protection of the Federal Trade Commission, 2009–13	
Mark von Hagen	1976	SFS	Director of School of Historical, Philosophical and Religious Studies at Arizona State University; director of the Harriman Institute at Columbia University, 1989–2001	

== Business ==
Name	Class year	School/ degree	Notability	Reference
Joseph R. Baczko	1967	SFS	President and chief operating officer of Blockbuster Entertainment, 1991–93; founder and president of Toys "R" Us International, 1983–1990; CEO of Max Factor-Europe, 1979–83; dean of the Lubin School of Business of Pace University	
Henri Beaufour	1987	Col	Chairman of the Board of Ipsen	
Denise Bode	1984	LL.M.	CEO of the American Wind Energy Association; Oklahoma Corporation Commissioner, 1997–2007	
David G. Bradley	1983	Law	Founder of the Advisory Board Company; owner of the Atlantic Media Company	
Charles Bunch	1971	SFS	Chairman and CEO of PPG Industries; chairman of the National Association of Manufacturers, 2007–08	
Charles Cawley	1962	Col	Chairman and CEO of MBNA	
Michael Chasen	1995	MBA	Co-founder and CEO of Blackboard Inc., 1999–2012	
Bud Colligan	1976	SFS	Co-chairman of the Monterey Bay Economic Partnership; founder and CEO of South Swell Ventures; chairman and CEO of Macromedia, 1992–97	
Catherine Cook	2011	MSB	Co-founder of the social networking site myYearbook	
Peter L. Corsell	2000	SFS	Founder of GridPoint, co-founder of Twenty First Century Utilities	
Josh D'Amaro	1993	MSB	Businessman; chairman of Disney Experiences since 2020; scheduled to succeed Bob Iger as chief executive officer (CEO) of the Walt Disney Company on March 18, 2026	
Charles Donnelly	1896	Law	President of the Northern Pacific Railway, 1920–39	
William Doyle	1972	Col	President and CEO of Potash Corporation of Saskatchewan, 1999–2015; chairman of the Board of Directors of Georgetown University	
Mary Callahan Erdoes	1989	Col	CEO of J.P. Morgan Asset Management, 2009–present	
Nicholas C. Forstmann	1969	MSB	Founding partner of Forstmann Little & Company	
Joe Garagiola Jr.	1975	Law	Senior vice president for Standards and On-Field Operations for Major League Baseball, 2011–present; senior vice president and general manager for the Arizona Diamondbacks, 1997–2005	
Dexter Goei	1993	SFS	CEO of Altice	
Rolando Gonzalez-Bunster	1968		Chairman and CEO of InterEnergy Holdings	
Antonio Gracias	1992; 1993	SFS	Billionaire private equity investor, founder of Valor Equity Partners, Tesla and SpaceX board member, member of Department of Government Efficiency, member of School of Foreign Service board of advisors	
James J. Greco	1980	Col	CEO of Bruegger's, 2003–2011; CEO of Sbarro, 2012–13; president of Newk's Eatery	
Dawn Halfaker	2009	Grad	Founder and former CEO of Halfaker and Associates, an information technology services firm	
Jeffrey W. Greenberg	1976	Law	Chairman and CEO of Marsh & McLennan Companies, 1999–2004	
Ken Hakuta	1972	MSB	TV personality known as "Dr. Fad;" CEO of Allherb.com Foundation	
Eric Hotung	1951	Col	Hong Kong billionaire businessman, philanthropist	
Luci Baines Johnson	1965–1966*	Nur	Chairwoman of the LBJ Holding Company	
Jim Kimsey	1958*	Col	Founder, CEO, and chairman of America Online (AOL)	
Mehmet Omer Koç	Attended		Chairman of Koç Holding, Tüpraş, and Koç University	
Jules Kroll	1966	Law	Founder of Kroll Inc.	
Thomas E. Leavey	1923	Law	Co-founder of Farmers Insurance; co-founder of the Thomas and Dorothy Leavey Foundation	
Doug Leeds	1996	Law	CEO of Ask.com	
Ted Leonsis	1977	Col	Founder, chairman, and CEO of Monumental Sports & Entertainment; vice chairman emeritus of AOL; chairman of SnagFilms	
Michael J. Mauboussin	1986	Col	Managing director and head of Consilient Research at Morgan Stanley Investment Management; chief investment strategist, Legg Mason	
Morgan E. O'Brien	1966	Col	Founder and chairman of Cyren Call Communications, 2005–present; co-founder and chairman of Nextel Communications (now Sprint Nextel Corporation), 1987–95	
Martin P. Paone	1978	Grad	Chairman of Timmons and Company, 2008–present; secretary for the majority of the United States Senate; deputy assistant to the president for legislative affairs	
Paul Pelosi	1962	SFS	Owner of Financial Leasing Services, Inc.; owner of the Sacramento Mountain Lions and United Football League; husband of Speaker Nancy Pelosi; three of their children are Georgetown grads	
Gary Perlin	1972	SFS	Chief financial officer of Capital One Financial Corporation, 2003–present; chief financial officer and vice president of the World Bank	
Peter J. Pestillo	1963	Law	Chairman and CEO of Visteon	
Charles Prince	1983	Law	Chairman and CEO of Citigroup	
Patricia Russo	1972	Col	CEO of Lucent and CEO of Alcatel-Lucent	
Chris Sacca	1997, 2000	SFS, Law	Former head of special initiatives at Google; venture capital investor in Twitter and Uber; founder of Lowercase Capital and Lowercarbon Capital	
Ann Sarnoff	1983	MSB	Chairwoman and CEO of Warner Bros.	
Thomas Schlafly	1977	Law	President and co-founder of the Saint Louis Brewery	
Laurence Tosi	1990; 1994	MSB; Law/MBA	CFO of Airbnb; former CFO of The Blackstone Group	
Eric Trump	2006	MSB	Executive vice president of The Trump Organization; owner of Trump Winery; son of U.S. President Donald Trump	
Ivanka Trump	2000–2002*	MSB	Executive vice president of The Trump Organization; model; daughter of U.S. President Donald Trump	
Tiffany Trump	2020	Law	Socialite; daughter of U.S. President Donald Trump	
August Francois von Finck	1999	MSB	Majority stakeholder in several multinational companies such as SGS S.A. and Von Roll Holding	
Marcus Wallenberg	1980	SFS	President and CEO of Investor AB; chairman of International Chamber of Commerce; vice chairman of the Institute of International Finance	
David Wehner	1990	Col	Chief financial officer of Facebook, Inc., 2014–present	
Mark Weinberger	1991	LL.M.	Chairman and CEO of Ernst & Young; former assistant secretary of the treasury for tax policy	
Ralph V. Whitworth	1985	Law	Founder and principal of Relational Investors; former chairman of Waste Management, Inc., and Apria HealthCare Group, Inc.	
Tiffany Yu	2010	Col	Disability activist and founder of Diversability, a social enterprise attempting to create opportunities for disabled people	

== Civil society ==
=== Religion ===
Name	Class year	School/ degree	Notability	Reference
Most Rev. Joseph Bernard Brunini	1930	Col	Bishop of Jackson	
Most Rev. Jose Maria Cuenco		Law	First archbishop of Jaro	
Most Rev. George Henry Guilfoyle	1935	Col	Bishop of Camden	
HE John O'Connor	1970	Grad	Cardinal archbishop of New York; chief of chaplains of the United States Navy, 1979–83	
Most Rev. Thomas John Rodi	1971	Col	Archbishop of Mobile	

=== Think tanks, non-profit and activism ===
Name	Class year	School/ degree	Notability	Reference
Mitch Bainwol	1981	Col	Lobbyist; chairman of the Alliance of Automobile Manufacturers; chairman and CEO of the Recording Industry Association of America	
Ed Bearss	1949	SFS	Historian; Chief Historian Emeritus of the National Park Service	
Beth Bechdol		SFS	Director-General of Food and Argriculture Organisation (FAO)	
Joseph Cirincione	1983	Grad	President of Ploughshares Fund, 2008–present; director for non-proliferation at the Carnegie Endowment for International Peace	
Joan Claybrook	1973	Law	President of Public Citizen, 1982–2008; administrator of the National Highway Traffic Safety Administration	
Brian Concannon	1989	Law	Director of the Institute for Justice & Democracy in Haiti	
Alexandra Cousteau	1998	SFS	Environmentalist; founder of Blue Legacy	
Nellie Gray	1959	Law	Anti-abortion activist; founder of March for Life	
Chad Griffin	1997	SFS	Founder of the American Foundation for Equal Rights; president of the Human Rights Campaign, 2012	
Lauren Hogg	2025	CAS	Gun control activist, author, and co-founder of March for Our Lives.	
Mary Ellen Iskenderian	1981	SFS	President and CEO of Women's World Banking (microfinance)	
Jan Karski	1952	Grad	World War II Polish resistance fighter; Polish diplomat; professor at Georgetown University for 40 years	
Tim King	1989, 1993	SFS, Law	Founder and CEO of Urban Prep Academies	
Barry W. Lynn	1978	Law	Executive director of Americans United for Separation of Church and State; ordained minister in the United Church of Christ	
Olivia Mellan	1972	SLL	Money conflict resolution coach and author of books on money psychology	
Richard Mudd	1921, 1922, 1936	Col, Grad, Med	Grandson of Dr. Samuel Mudd; led efforts to posthumously rehabilitate his grandfather's name	
Darcy Olsen	1993	SFS	CEO of the Goldwater Institute	
Kenneth Rutherford	2000	Grad	Co-founder of the Landmine Survivors Network; activist involved with the International Campaign to Ban Landmines, Convention on the Rights of Persons with Disabilities, and Convention on Cluster Munitions	
Anthony Shriver	1988	Col	President and founder of Best Buddies International	
Matthew Swift	2010	Col	Co-founder, chairman, and CEO of the Concordia Summit	
Matthew VanDyke	2004	SSP	Freedom fighter and prisoner of war in the 2011 Libyan Civil War	
William B. Walsh	1943	Med	Founder of Project HOPE; humanitarian aid activist; first U.S. physician on the ground in Hiroshima after the atomic bomb was dropped; recipient of the Presidential Medal of Freedom	

== Government and politics ==
=== Heads of state and government ===
Name	Class year	School/ degree	Notability	Reference
Ricardo Arias	1935	SFS	President of Panama, 1955–56	
José Manuel Barroso	1998	MSFS	President of the European Commission, 2004–2014; prime minister of Portugal, 2002–04	
Laura Chinchilla	1989	MPP	President of Costa Rica, 2010–14	
Bill Clinton	1968	SFS	President of the United States, 1993–2001	
Alfredo Cristiani	1968	MSB	President of El Salvador, 1989–94	
King Felipe VI	1995	MSFS	King of Spain, 2014–present	
Saad Hariri	1992	MSB	Prime minister of Lebanon, 2009–2011; prime minister of Lebanon, 2016–2020	
Abdullah II bin al-Hussein	1987	MSFS	King of Jordan, 1999–present	
Lyndon B. Johnson	1934	Law	President of the United States, 1963–69	
Željko Komšić	1982	SFS	Tripartite president of Bosnia, 2006–present	
Alfonso López Michelsen		SFS	President of Colombia, 1974–78	
Gloria Macapagal-Arroyo	1968	SFS	President of the Philippines, 2001–10	
Ivan Duque Marquez	2011	MPP	President of Colombia, 2018–2022	
Galo Plaza	1929	SFS	President of Ecuador, 1948–52; 4th secretary general of the Organization of American States, 1968–75	

=== Governors of the United States ===
This includes the governors of the states and territories of the United States.

Name	Class year	School/ degree	Notability	Reference
Toney Anaya	1963	SFS	Governor of New Mexico, 1983–87	
Coleman Livingston Blease	1889	Law	Governor of South Carolina, 1911–15; U.S. senator, 1925–31	
James Caleb Boggs	1937	Law	Governor of Delaware, 1953–60; United States senator, 1961–73; member of the United States House of Representatives, 1947–53	
John Lee Carroll		Col	Governor of Maryland, 1876–80; great-grandson of Charles Carroll of Carrollton	
Michael N. Castle	1964	Law	Governor of Delaware, 1985–92; United States representative, 1993–2011	
Peter Tali Coleman	1949, 1951	Col, Law	First appointed governor of American Samoa, 1956–61; first elected governor of American Samoa, 1978–85, 1989–93	
Jeff Colyer	1981	Col	Governor of Kansas, 2018–2019	
Mitch Daniels	1979	Law	Governor of Indiana, 2005–13; president of Purdue University	
Christopher Del Sesto	1938	Law	Governor of Rhode Island, 1959–61	
Michael V. DiSalle	1931	Law	Governor of Ohio, 1959–63	
William S. Flynn	1910	Law	Governor of Rhode Island, 1923–25	
Luis Fortuño	1982	SFS	Governor of the Commonwealth of Puerto Rico, 2009–13	
James H. Higgins	1900	Law	Governor of Rhode Island, 1907–09	
Frank Keating	1966	Col	Governor of Oklahoma, 1995–2003; president and CEO of the American Bankers Association	
John H. Lynch	1978	Law	Governor of New Hampshire, 2005–13	
Terry McAuliffe	1986	Law	Governor of Virginia, 2014–18; chairman of the Democratic National Committee	
Jim McGreevey	1981	Law	Governor of New Jersey, 2002–04	
Steve Merrill	1972	Law	Governor of New Hampshire, 1993–97	
Luis Muñoz Marín	1915*	Law	First democratically elected governor of Puerto Rico, 1949–65; known as the "father of modern Puerto Rico"	
Philip W. Noel	1957	Law	Governor of Rhode Island, 1973–77	
Thomas Pratt	1822*	Col	Governor of Maryland, 1845–1848, U.S. senator from Maryland, 1850–1857	
Pat Quinn	1971	SFS	Governor of Illinois, 2009–15	
James C. Shannon	1918	Col	Governor of Connecticut, 1948–49	
Don Siegelman	1972	Law	Governor of Alabama, 1999–2003	
John Spellman	1953	Law	Governor of Washington, 1981–85	

=== United States executive branch officials ===
==== Cabinet members ====
This includes members of the Cabinet of the United States.

Name	Class year	School/ degree	Notability	Reference
William W. Belknap	1851	Law	Secretary of war, 1869–76	
George Cortelyou	1895	Law	Secretary of the treasury, 1907–09; first secretary of commerce and labor, 1903–04; postmaster general, 1905–07	
Robert Gates	1974	Grad	Secretary of defense, 2006–11; director of Central Intelligence, 1991–93; president of the Boy Scouts of America; president of Texas A&M University, 2002–06	
Alexander Haig	1961	Grad	Secretary of state, 1981–82; Supreme Allied Commander Europe, 1974–79; White House chief of staff, 1973–74; CEO, United Technologies	
Mickey Kantor	1968	Law	Secretary of commerce, 1996–97; U.S. trade representative, 1993–96	
John F. Kelly	1984	SSP	Secretary of Homeland Security, 2017; White House chief of staff, 2017–2019	
Jack Lew	1975	Law	Secretary of the Treasury, 2013–2017; White House chief of staff, 2012–13; director, Office of Management and Budget, 1998–2001, 2010–12; deputy secretary of state for management and resources, 2009–10	
Denis McDonough	1996	MSFS	U.S. secretary of veterans affairs, 2021–2025; White House chief of staff, 2013–2017; deputy national security advisor, 2010–2014	
Kirstjen Nielsen	1994	SFS	Secretary of Homeland Security, 2017–2019	
Donald Rumsfeld	1957*	Law	Secretary of defense, 1975–77, 2001–06; White House chief of staff, 1974–75; U.S. permanent representative to NATO, 1973–74; director of the Office of Economic Opportunity, 1969–70; U.S. representative from Illinois, 1963–69	
Robert L. Wilkie	1992	LL.M.	Secretary of veterans affairs, 2018–2021; under secretary of defense for personnel and readiness, 2017–2018, assistant secretary of defense for legislative affairs, 2006–2009	

==== Cabinet-level officers ====
This includes persons who are not members of the Cabinet but hold positions that are of cabinet-level rank.

Name	Class year	School/ degree	Notability	Reference
Avril Haines	2001	Law	Director of National Intelligence, 2021–present; Deputy National Security Advisor, 2015–2017; deputy director of the CIA, 2013–15	
Robert Lighthizer	1969 1973	Col Law	United States trade representative, 2017–2021	
Mick Mulvaney	1989	SFS	Director of the Office of Management and Budget, 2017–2021; White House chief of staff, 2019–2020; U.S. representative from South Carolina, 2011–2017	
John Podesta	1976	Law	Counselor to the president, 2014–15; co-chairman of the Obama-Biden Transition Project, 2008–09; president and CEO, Center for American Progress, 2003–present; chief of staff to President Clinton, 1998–2001	
Charles Schultze	1948, 1950	Col, Grad	Chairman, Council of Economic Advisors in the Carter administration; director, Office of Management and Budget, 1965–68	
George Tenet	1976	SFS	Director of Central Intelligence, 1997–2004	

==== Agency heads and subordinate officers ====
This includes the heads of federal independent agencies and officers subordinate to the heads of executive departments.

Name	Class year	School/ degree	Notability	Reference
Horace M. Albright	1914	Law	Director of the National Park Service, 1929–33; conservationist; recipient of the Presidential Medal of Freedom	
Roger Altman	1967	Col	Deputy Secretary of the Treasury, 1993–94, founder and senior chairman of Evercore	
Bradley Belt	1984	Law	Executive director of Pension Benefit Guarantee Corporation, 2004–06	
Philip Bilden	1986	SFS	Secretary of the Navy (nominee pending confirmation)	
Robert C. Bonner	1966	Law	Commissioner of the U.S. Customs and Border Protection, 2001–05; Administrator of the Drug Enforcement Administration, 1990–93; Judge of the U.S. District Court for the Central District of California, 1989–90	
Chad M. Cary		GAI	National Oceanic and Atmospheric Administration (NOAA) Commissioned Officer Corps rear admiral; director, NOAA Commissioned Officer Corps (2024–present)	
Bradford P. Campbell		Law	Assistant secretary of Labor for Employee Benefits, 2007–09	
Paul Clement	1987	SFS	Solicitor general of the United States, 2004–08	
Paula Dobriansky	1977	SFS	Under Secretary of State for Democracy and Global Affairs, 2001–09	
John J. Easton Jr.	1970	Law	Assistant secretary of energy for domestic and international rnergy policy; Vermont attorney general, 1981–85	
Douglas Feith	1978	Law	Undersecretary of Defense for Policy, 2001–05	
Edwin Foulke	1993	Law	Assistant secretary of labor for occupational safety and health, 2006–08	
Mark Gearan	1991	Law	Director of the Peace Corps, 1995–99; White House deputy chief of staff, 1993; president of Hobart and William Smith Colleges, 1999–present	
Maura Harty	1981	SFS	Assistant secretary of state for consular affairs, 2002–08; CEO, International Centre for Missing and Exploited Children	
Kim R. Holmes	1982	Grad	Assistant secretary of state for international organization affairs, 2002–15; vice president of Foreign and Defense Policy Studies at The Heritage Foundation	
Michael P. Jackson	1985	Grad	Deputy secretary of Homeland Security, 2005–07	
Elaine D. Kaplan	1979	Law	Acting director of the Office of Personnel Management, 2013; judge of the United States Court of Federal Claims, 2013–present	
Patrick F. Kennedy	1971	SFS	Under secretary of state for management, 2007–2017	
Robert M. Kimmitt	1977	Law	Acting U.S. secretary of the treasury, 2006; deputy secretary of the treasury, 2005–09; U.S. ambassador to Germany, 1991–93; undersecretary of state for political affairs, 1989–91	
Frederick Lawton	1920, 1934	Col, Law	Director of the Bureau of the Budget, 1950–53	
Jane Holl Lute	1999	Law	Deputy secretary of Homeland Security, 2009–13; CEO, Council on CyberSecurity	
Robert Mosbacher Jr.	1973	Col	President of Overseas Private Investment Corporation; chairman of Mosbacher Energy Company	
Andrew Natsios	1971	Col	Administrator of the U.S. Agency for International Development, 2001–06; U.S. special envoy to Sudan, 2006–07; chairman of the Massachusetts Turnpike Authority, 2000–01; chairman of the Massachusetts Republican Party, 1980–87; member of the Massachusetts House of Representatives, 1975–87	
Jerome Powell	1979	Law	16th chair of the Federal Reserve	
Michael Powell	1993	Law	Chairman of the Federal Communications Commission, 2001–2005; president of the National Cable & Telecommunications Association, 2011–present	
Matthew A. Reynolds	1986	SFS	Assistant secretary of state for legislative affairs, 2008–09	
Charles O. Rossotti	1962	Col	Commissioner of Internal Revenue, 1997–2002	
Michael A. Sheehan	1988	MSFS	Assistant Secretary of Defense for Special Operations/Low Intensity Conflict & Interdependent Capabilities, 2011–13; Assistant secretary-general for Mission Support, 2001–03; first U.S. ambassador-at-large for counterterrorism, 1998–2000	
Douglas Shulman	1999	Law	Commissioner of Internal Revenue, 2008–12	
Harry A. Slattery			Under secretary of the tnterior, 1938–39; gave his name to the Slattery Report	
Daniel Tarullo	1973	Col	Governor of the Federal Reserve, 2009–2017	
Barbara Underwood	1969	Law	Solicitor general of New York, 2007–present; acting solicitor general of the United States, 2001; principal deputy solicitor general of the United States, 1998–2001	
Christine A. Varney	1986	Law	Assistant attorney general for the Antitrust Division, 2009–11; Federal Trade Commissioner, 1994–97	
Claudine Weiher	1967	MA	Acting deputy Archivist of the United States, 1986–1987; deputy Archivist of the United States, 1988–1993	
C. David Welch	1975	SFS	Assistant secretary of state for Near Eastern affairs, 2005–08	
Richard E. Wiley	1962	LL.M.	Chairman of the Federal Communications Commission, 1974–77; founding partner of Wiley Rein & Fielding	

==== White House staff ====
This includes members of the Executive Office of the President.

Name	Class year	School/ degree	Notability	Reference
Jerry Abramson	1971	Law	White House director of intergovernmental affairs, 2014–17; lieutenant governor of Kentucky, 2011–14; mayor of Louisville, Kentucky, 1986–99, 2003–11	
David Addington	1978	SFS	Chief of staff to Vice President Dick Cheney, 2005–09	
Elizabeth Alexander	2008	Law	Press secretary to Vice President Joe Biden, 2009–2011	
Steve Bannon	1982	SSP	White House chief strategist and senior counselor to the President, 2017	
Pat Buchanan	1961	Col	Advisor to Presidents Richard Nixon, Gerald Ford, and Ronald Reagan; White House communications director, 1985–87; nationally syndicated political pundit; a frequent commentator on The McLaughlin Group	
Stephanie Cutter	1997	Law	Assistant to the president for special projects, 2010; communications director of the U.S. Treasury, 2009–10; chief spokesperson for the Obama-Biden Transition Project, 2008–09; chief of staff to Michelle Obama, 2008 presidential election campaign	
Olivia Dalton			Principal deputy press secretary for the Biden administration	
John Dean	1965	Law	White House counsel to President Richard Nixon during the Watergate affair, 1970–73	
Ron Klain	1983	Col	White House chief of staff, 2021–2023; chief of staff to Vice President Joe Biden, 2008–11; assistant to the president and chief of Ssaff to Vice President Al Gore, 1995–99; U.S. Ebola response coordinator, 2014–15	
Frederick Lawton	1920, 1934	Col, Law	Director of the Bureau of the Budget, 1950–53	
Joe Lockhart	1982	Col	White House press secretary, 1998–2000	
Mike McCurry	1985	Grad	Press secretary to President Clinton, 1995–98	
Kayleigh McEnany	2010	SFS	White House press secretary, 2020–2021	
Beth Nolan	1980	Law	White House counsel to President Clinton, 1999–2001	
Meghan O'Sullivan	1991	Col	Assistant to the president and deputy national security advisor for Iraq and Afghanistan, 2005–07	
Dan Pfeiffer	1998	Col	White House communications director, 2009–13; senior advisor to President Obama, 2013–15	
Jack Quinn	1971, 1975	Col, Law	White House counsel to President Bill Clinton, 1995–96	
Kathryn Ruemmler	1996	Law	White House counsel to President Obama, 2011–2014	

==== Ambassadors of the United States ====
This includes ambassadors of the United States to foreign states, international organizations, and at-large causes.

Name	Class year	School/ degree	Notability	Reference
David Manker Abshire	1959	Grad	President, Center for the Study of the Presidency and Congress; U.S. permanent representative to NATO, 1983–87; co-founder of Center for Strategic and International Studies; advisor to President Ronald Reagan	
Anne Slaughter Andrew	1977	Col	U.S. ambassador to Costa Rica, 2009–2013	
Alexander A. Arvizu	1980	SFS	U.S. ambassador to Albania, 2010–14	
Diego C. Asencio	1952, 1953	SFS, Grad	U.S. ambassador to Brazil, 1983–86; U.S. ambassador to Colombia, 1977–80	
Christopher C. Ashby	1968	SFS	U.S. ambassador to Uruguay, 1997–2001	
Elizabeth Frawley Bagley	1987	Law	U.S. ambassador to Portugal, 1994–97; senior advisor to U.S. Secretary of State Madeleine Albright; special representative for Global Partnerships	
Vincent M. Battle	1962	SFS	U.S. ambassador to Lebanon, 2001–04	
Willard L. Beaulac	1921	SFS	U.S. ambassador to Paraguay, 1944–47; U.S. ambassador to Colombia, 1947–51; U.S. ambassador to Cuba, 1951–53; U.S. ambassador to Chile, 1953–56; U.S. ambassador to Argentina, 1956–60	
John W. Blaney	1976	MSFS	U.S. ambassador to Liberia, 2002–05	
Richard J. Bloomfield	1950	SFS	U.S. ambassador to Portugal, 1978–82; U.S. ambassador to Ecuador, 1976–78	
Donald E. Booth	1976	SFS	U.S.United States special envoy to Sudan, 2017–present; U.S. special envoy to Sudan and South Sudan, 2013–2017; U.S. ambassador to Ethiopia, 2010–13; U.S. ambassador to Zambia, 2008–10; U.S. ambassador to Liberia, 2005–08	
Piper Anne Wind Campbell	1988	SFS	U.S. ambassador to Mongolia, 2012–present	
Maura Connelly	1981	SFS	U.S. ambassador to Lebanon, 2010–13; U.S. chargé d'affaires a.i to Syria, 2008–10	
Ivo H. Daalder	1982	Grad	U.S. permanent representative to NATO, 2009–13	
Alexander Dimitry	1832; 1859	Grad; Law	First person of color to become U.S. ambassador of Costa Rica and Nicaragua, 1859–1861	
Edward P. Djerejian	1960	SFS	U.S. ambassador to Israel, 1993–94; U.S. ambassador to Syria, 1988–91; assistant secretary of state for Near Eastern affairs, 1991–93; founding director of the James A. Baker III Institute for Public Policy at Rice University	
Thomas J. Dodd Jr.	1957	SFS	U.S. ambassador to Costa Rica, 1997–2001; U.S. ambassador to Uruguay, 1993–97	
Cynthia G. Efird	1971	SFS	U.S. ambassador to Angola, 2004–07	
Maurice Francis Egan	1879	Col	U.S. ambassador to Denmark, 1907–18	
Lee A. Feinstein	1995	Law	U.S. ambassador to Poland, 2009–12	
Laurie S. Fulton	1989	Law	U.S. ambassador to Denmark, 2009–13	
Peter W. Galbraith	1990	Law	U.S. ambassador to Croatia, 1993–98; United Nations representative in East Timor, 2000–01; member of the Vermont Senate, 2011–15	
Marc Ginsberg	1978	Law	U.S. ambassador to Morocco, 1994–98	
Mark Gitenstein	1975	MSFS	U.S. ambassador to Romania, 2009–12	
Scott Gration	1988	Grad	U.S. ambassador to Kenya, 2011–12; major general, United States Air Force	
David Hale	1983	SFS	U.S. ambassador to Pakistan, 2015–present; U.S. ambassador to Lebanon, 2013–15; U.S. special envoy for Middle East Peace, 2011–13; U.S. ambassador to Jordan, 2004–08	
Michael A. Hammer	1985	SFS	U.S. ambassador to the Democratic Republic of the Congo, 2018–present; U.S. ambassador to Chile, 2014–2016; assistant secretary of state for public affairs, 2011–2013	
S. Fitzgerald Haney	1991	SFS/MSFS	U.S. ambassador to Costa Rica, 2015–17	
Harry B. Harris Jr.	1994	SSP	U.S. ambassador to South Korea, 2018–2021; former commander, U.S. Pacific Command; U.S. Navy admiral	
Parker T. Hart	1940	SFS	U.S. ambassador to Turkey, 1965–68; U.S. ambassador to Saudi Arabia, 1961–65; U.S. ambassador to Kuwait, 1962–63; U.S. ambassador to Yemen, 1961–62	
Maura Harty	1981	SFS	President and CEO of International Centre for Missing & Exploited Children; assistant secretary of state for consular affairs, 2002–08; U.S. ambassador to Paraguay, 1997–99	
John E. Herbst	1974	SFS	U.S. ambassador to Ukraine, 2003–06; U.S. ambassador to Uzbekistan, 2000–03	
Stuart Holliday	1988	SFS	President and CEO of Meridian International Center, 2006–present; U.S. ambassador to the United Nations for Special Political Affairs, 2003–05; principal deputy assistant secretary of state for public affairs and coordinator of the Bureau of International Information Programs, 2001–03; special assistant to the president and associate director of presidential personnel, 2001–03	
Eric G. John	1982	SFS	U.S. ambassador to Thailand, 2007–10	
U. Alexis Johnson	1932	SFS	U.S. ambassador-at-large, 1973–77; U.S. ambassador to Japan, 1966–68; U.S. ambassador to Thailand, 1958–61; U.S. ambassador to Czechoslovakia, 1953–57	
James R. Jones	1964	Law	U.S. ambassador to Mexico, 1993–97; member of the U.S. House of Representatives from Oklahoma, 1973–87; White House appointments Sscretary, 1968–69	
John Hubert Kelly	1982	SFS Fellow	U.S. ambassador to Finland, 1991–94; assistant secretary of state for Near Eastern and South Asian affairs, 1989–91; U.S. ambassador to Lebanon, 1986–88	
William Kintner	1948, 1950	Grad, Grad	U.S. ambassador to Thailand, 1973–75; member of the board of directors, United States Institute of Peace	
Alphonse F. La Porta	1960	SFS	U.S. ambassador to Mongolia, 1997–2000	
Frank Lavin	1979, 1985	SFS, Grad	Undersecretary of commerce for international Ttade, 2005–07; U.S. ambassador to Singapore, 2001–05	
Edward B. Lawson	1924, 1925	SFS, Grad	U.S. ambassador to Israel, 1954–59; U.S. ambassador to Iceland, 1949–54	
Hugo Llorens	1977	SFS	U.S. ambassador to Honduras, 2008–11	
John Maisto	1961	SFS	U.S. ambassador to the Organization of American States, 2003–07; U.S. ambassador to Venezuela, 1997–2000; U.S. ambassador to Nicaragua, 1993–96	
Eileen Malloy	1975	SFS	Deputy assistant ecretary of state for European and Canadian Affairs, 1997–99; U.S. ambassador to Kyrgyzstan, 1994–97	
Richard T. McCormack	1963	Col	U.S. ambassador to the Organization of American States, 1985–89; under secretary of state for economic, business, and agricultural affairs, 1989–91	
Jackson McDonald	1978	SFS	U.S. ambassador to Guinea, 2004–07; U.S. ambassador to the Gambia, 2001–04	
Jack K. McFall	1929	SFS	U.S. ambassador to Finland, 1952–55; assistant secretary of state for legislative affairs, 1949–52	
Gerald S. McGowan	1968, 1974	SFS, Law	U.S. ambassador to Portugal, 1997–2001	
Alfred H. Moses	1956	Law	U.S. ambassador to Romania, 1994–97	
Stephen Mull	1980	SFS	Executive secretary of the U.S. Department of State, 2009–12; acting assistant secretary of state for political-military affairs, 2007–08; U.S. ambassador to Poland, 2012–15; U.S. ambassador to Lithuania, 2003–06	
Cameron Munter	1991	SFS Rusk Fellow	U.S. ambassador to Pakistan, 2010–12; U.S. ambassador to Serbia, 2007–09	
Richard Norland	1977	SFS	U.S. ambassador to Libya, 2019–present; U.S. ambassador to Georgia, 2012–2015; U.S. ambassador to Uzbekistan, 2007–10	
Frank V. Ortiz Jr.	1950	SFS	United States Ambassador to Argentina, 1983–86; Peru, 1981–83; Guatemala, 1979–80; United States Ambassador to Barbados, Grenada, Dominica, St. Lucia, Antigua, St. Christopher-Nevis-Anguilla, 1977–79	
Manuel Rocha	1978	Grad	U.S. ambassador to Bolivia, 2000–02	
Francis Rooney	1975, 1978	Col, Law	U.S. ambassador to the Holy See, 2005–08	
David M. Satterfield	1978	Law	U.S. ambassador to Lebanon, 1998–2001	
David Scheffer	1978	LL.M.	First U.S. ambassador-at-large for war crimes issues, 1997–2000	
Thomas L. Siebert	1968, 1972	Col, Law	U.S. ambassador to Sweden, 1994–98	
Nancy Soderberg	1984	MSFS	U.S. representative for special political affairs at the United Nations, 1997–2001; chairperson of the Public Interest Declassification Board, 2012–15	
James C. Swan		SFS	U.S. ambassador to the Democratic Republic of the Congo, 2013–2016; U.S. ambassador to Djibouti, 2008–11	
John F. Tefft	1978	Grad	U.S. ambassador to Russia, 2014–2017; U.S. ambassador to Ukraine, 2009–13; U.S. ambassador to Georgia, 2005–09; U.S. ambassador to Lithuania, 2000–03	
Patrick N. Theros	1963	SFS	U.S. ambassador to Qatar, 1995–98	
Viron P. Vaky	1947	SFS	assistant secretary of state for inter-American affairs, 1978–79; U.S. ambassador to Venezuela, 1976–78; U.S. ambassador to Colombia, 1974–76; U.S. ambassador to Costa Rica, 1972–74	
Richard Verma	1998	Law	U.S. ambassador to India, 2015–2017; assistant secretary of state for legislative affairs, 2009–present	
Melanne Verveer	1966, 1969	SLL, Grad	U.S. ambassador-at-large forgGlobal women's issues; assistant to President Bill Clinton and chief of staff to First Lady Hillary Clinton, 1997–2001; co-founder and chair of Vital Voices Global Partnership	
Richard David Vine	1949	SFS	Director of the Bureau for Refugee Programs, 1982; U.S. ambassador to Switzerland, 1979–81	
C. David Welch	1975	SFS	Assistant secretary of state for Near Eastern affairs, 2005–08; U.S. ambassador to Egypt, 2001–05; assistant secretary of state for international organization affairs, 1998–2002	
Melissa F. Wells	1956	SFS	U.S. ambassador to Estonia, 1998–2001; U.S. ambassador to Congo-Kinshasa, 1991–93; U.S. ambassador to Mozambique, 1987–90; U.S. ambassador to Guinea-Bissau, 1976–77; U.S. ambassador to Cape Verde, 1976–77	

=== Military ===
Name	Class year	School/ degree	Notability	Reference
Gen. John R. Allen	1983	MSFS	Commander of the International Security Assistance Force, 2011–13; commander of U.S. Central Command, 2010; special presidential envoy for the Global Coalition to Counter the Islamic State of Iraq and the Levant, 2014–present	
Rear Admiral Charles Boarman	1803–1808	Col	Commanded numerous U.S. Navy ships, most notably the USS Brandywine during the Mexican–American War	
Lt. Gen. Paul Caraway	1933	Law	High Commissioner of the United States Civil Administration of the Ryukyu Islands, 1961–64	
Gen. George W. Casey Jr.	1970	SFS	Chief of Staff of the United States Army, 2007–11; commander of Multi-National Force – Iraq, 2004–07	
Maj. Gen. William R. Collins	1935	SFS	Commanding general of III Marine Expeditionary Force, 1965; commanding general of 3rd Marine Division, 1964–65	
Brig. Gen. John M. K. Davis	1862	Col	Commanding general of artillery districts during the Spanish–American War	
Gen. Joseph Dunford	1985	Grad	Chairman of the Joint Chiefs of Staff, 2015–2019; commandant of the Marine Corps, 2014–15; commander of the International Security Assistance Force, 2012–14	
Maj. Gen. Michael E. Ennis	1984	Grad	Deputy director of HUMINT of the CIA, 2006–07; director of the Marine Corps Intelligence Command, 2000–04	
Lt. Col. Don C. Faith Jr.	1941	SFS	Commanding officer of 1st Battalion, 32d Infantry Regiment, 7th Infantry Division, during the Battle of Chosin Reservoir; Medal of Honor recipient	
Maj. Gen. John Fugh	1957	SFS	Judge Advocate General of the United States Army, 1991–93; chairman of the Committee of 100; first Chinese-American to become a general officer in the U.S. Army	
Lt. Gen. John D. Gardner	1986	Grad	Deputy commander of United States European Command; commander of United States Army South	
Brig. Gen. Hiram "Doc" Jones	1978	Grad	deputy chief of chaplains of the U.S. Air Force, 1997–99	
Gen. James L. Jones	1966	SFS	National security advisor to President Obama, 2009–10; Supreme Allied Commander Europe, 2003–06; commandant of the Marine Corps, 1999–2003	
Gen. Louis C. Menetrey	1967	MSFS	Commander-in-chief of United Nations Command/ROK-US Combined Forces Command	
Maj. Gen. Dennis J. Murphy	1953	Col	Commanding general, 2nd Marine Division, 1984–1987	
Vice Admiral Robert B. Murrett	1982	Grad	Director of the National Geospatial-Intelligence Agency, 2006–10; director of the Office of Naval Intelligence, 2005–06	
Gen. David Petraeus	1994–1995	SFS Fellow	Director of the Central Intelligence Agency, 2011–12; commander of the International Security Assistance Force, 2010–11; commander of United States Central Command, 2008–10	
Vice Admiral Ann E. Rondeau	1982	Grad	President of the National Defense University, 2009–12; director of Navy Staff, 2005–06; highest ranking woman in the U.S. Navy	
Gen. John J. Sheehan	1985	Grad	Supreme Allied Commander Atlantic/commander-in-chief of U.S. Atlantic Command, 1994–97	
Vice Admiral William D. Sullivan	1990	SSP	U.S. military representative to NATO	
Lt. Gen. Guy C. Swan III	1987	Grad	Commander of United States Army North; commander of United States Army Military District of Washington/Joint Force Headquarters National Capital Region, 2005–07	
Maj. Gen. James L. Williams	1981	Grad	Commanding general of the 4th Marine Division	

=== Judges ===
Name	Class year	School/ degree	Notability	Reference
Thomas L. Ambro	1972, 1975	Col, Law	Judge, U.S. Court of Appeals for the Third Circuit, 2000–present	
Walter M. Bastian	1913	Law	Judge of the United States Court of Appeals for the District of Columbia Circuit, 1954–75	
Richard C. Bosson	1969	Law	Chief justice, New Mexico Supreme Court, 2002–06; associate justice, New Mexico Supreme Court, 2006–present	
Richard J. Bowie	1826	Law	Chief judge, Maryland Court of Appeals, 1861–67; member of the United States House of Representatives, 1849–53	
Richard C. Casey	1958	Law	Judge, U.S. District Court for the Southern District of New York, 1997–2007; the nation's first blind federal trial judge	
John O. Colvin	1978	Law	Chief judge, United States Tax Court, 2006–present	
Francis B. Condon	1916	Law	Chief justice, Rhode Island Supreme Court, 1958–65; member of the United States House of Representatives, 1930–35	
Charles W. Daniels	1971	LL.M.	Chief justice, New Mexico Supreme Court, 2010–12; associate justice, New Mexico Supreme Court, 2007–present	
Ronald Davies	1930	Law	Judge of the U.S. District Court for the District of North Dakota, 1955–96; temporarily assigned to the U.S. District Court for the Eastern District of Arkansas and presided over the Little Rock Integration Crisis case	
Robert E. Davis	1964	Law	Chief justice, Kansas Supreme Court, 2009–10; associate justice, Kansas Supreme Court, 1993–2009	
Charles H. Fahy	1914	Law	Judge of the United States Court of Appeals for the District of Columbia Circuit, 1949–67; solicitor general of the United States, 1941–45	
D. Michael Fisher	1966, 1969	Col, Law	Judge, U.S. Court of Appeals for the Third Circuit, 2003–present	
Arthur J. Gajarsa	1967	Law	Judge, U.S. Court of Appeals for the Federal Circuit, 1997–2011	
Lorie Skjerven Gildea	1986	Law	Chief justice, Minnesota Supreme Court, 2010–present; associate justice, Minnesota Supreme Court, 2006–10	
Thomas M. Hardiman	1990	Law	Judge, U.S. Court of Appeals for the Third Circuit, 2007–present	
William Hitz	1900	Law	Judge of the U.S. Court of Appeals for the District of Columbia Circuit, 1931–35	
Helen E. Hoens	1979	Law	Associate justice, New Jersey Supreme Court, 2006–13	
Thomas F. Hogan	1960, 1966	Col, Law	Director, Administrative Office of the United States Courts, 2011–13; chief judge, U.S. District Court for the District of Columbia, 2001–08	
Jerome A. Holmes	1988	Law	Judge, U.S. Court of Appeals for the Tenth Circuit	
Jeffrey R. Howard	1981	Law	Chief judge, U.S. Court of Appeals for the First Circuit, 2015–present; judge, U.S. Court of Appeals for the First Circuit, 2002–15	
Kent A. Jordan	1984	Law	Judge, U.S. Court of Appeals for the Third Circuit, 2006–present	
Bruce E. Kasold	1900	Law	Chief judge of the U.S. Court of Appeals for Veterans Claims, 2010–15	
Esther Mayambala Kisaakye	1994	Law	Associate justice, Supreme Court of Uganda, 2009–present	
Rives Kistler	1981	Law	Associate justice, Oregon Supreme Court, 2003–2018	
Stephen P. Lamb	1975	Law	Vice chancellor, Delaware Court of Chancery, 1997–2009	
Joseph Normand Laplante	1987, 1990	Col, Law	Chief judge, U.S. District Court for the District of New Hampshire, 2011–2018; judge, U.S. District Court for the District of New Hampshire, 2007–present	
Richard Linn	1969	Col, Law	Judge, U.S. Court of Appeals for the Federal Circuit, 1999–2012	
Hall S. Lusk	1904, 1907	Col, Law	Chief justice, Oregon Supreme Court, 1949–51, associate justice, Oregon Supreme Court, 1937–68; United States senator from Oregon, 1960	
M. Margaret McKeown	1975	Law	Judge, U.S. Court of Appeals for the Ninth Circuit, 1998–present	
Kimberly Ann Moore	1994	Law	Judge, U.S. Court of Appeals for the Federal Circuit, 2006–present	
Fred I. Parker	1965	Law	Judge, U.S. Court of Appeals for the Second Circuit, 1994–2003; chief judge, U.S. District Court for the District of Vermont, 1991–94	
E. Barrett Prettyman	1915	Law	Judge, U.S. Court of Appeals for the District of Columbia Circuit, 1945–71; the E. Barrett Prettyman United States Courthouse is named in his honor	
Vanessa Ruiz	1975	Law	Associate judge, District of Columbia Court of Appeals, 1994–2011	
Antonin Scalia	1957	Col	Associate justice, United States Supreme Court, 1986–2016	
Dennis Shedd	1980	LL.M.	Judge, U.S. Court of Appeals for the Fourth Circuit, 2002–present	
Eugene Edward Siler Jr.	1964	LL.M.	Judge of the U.S. Court of Appeals for the Sixth Circuit, 1991–2001	
John Sirica	1926	Law	Chief judge, U.S. District Court for the District of Columbia, 1971–74; Time "Man of the Year" 1973	
Timothy C. Stanceu	1979	Law	Chief judge of the U.S. Court of International Trade, 2014–present	
Laura Denvir Stith	1978	Law	Chief justice, Missouri Supreme Court, 2007–09; judge, Missouri Supreme Court, 2001–present	
Eugene R. Sullivan	1971	Law	Chief judge, U.S. Court of Appeals for the Armed Forces, 1990–95; judge, U.S. Court of Appeals for the Armed Forces, 1986–2002	
Edward A. Tamm	1930	Law	Judge, U.S. Court of Appeals for the District of Columbia Circuit, 1965–85; deputy direct, Federal Bureau of Investigation, 1930–48	
George Van Hoomissen	1955, 1957	Law, LL.M.	Associate justice, Oregon Supreme Court, 1988–2001	
Edward Douglass White	1863	Col	Chief justice of the United States, 1910–21	
James R. Zazzali	1958, 1962	Col, Law	Chief justice, New Jersey Supreme Court, 2006–07	

=== United States Congress ===
The bicameral United States Congress is composed of two houses.

==== U.S. senators ====
This includes members of the United States Senate.

Name	Class year	School/ degree	Notability	Reference
John A. Barrasso	1974, 1978	Col, Med	U.S. senator from Wyoming, 2007–present	
Alan Bible	1934	Law	U.S. senator from Nevada, 1954–74	
Dennis Chávez	1920	Law	U.S. senator from New Mexico, 1935–62; first American-born Hispanic senator; member of the United States House of Representatives, 1931–35	
Richard Durbin	1966, 1969	SFS, Law	Senate majority whip, 2007–15; Senate minority whip, 2015–present; U.S. senator from Illinois, 1997–present; member of the United States House of Representatives, 1983–97	
John A. Durkin	1965	Law	U.S. senator from New Hampshire, 1975–80	
Philip A. Hart	1934	Col	U.S. senator from Michigan, 1959–76; Lieutenant Governor of Michigan, 1955–59; Hart Senate Office Building named in his honor	
Mazie Hirono	1978	Law	U.S. senator from Hawaii, 2013–present; member of the United States House of Representatives, 2007–13; lieutenant governor of Hawaii, 1994–2002	
Francis Kernan	1836	Col	U.S. senator from New York, 1875–81; member of the United States House of Representatives, 1863–65	
Mark Kirk	1992	Law	U.S. senator from Illinois, 2010–17; member of the United States House of Representatives, 2001–10	
Edward Leahy	1908	Law	U.S. senator from Rhode Island, 1949–50	
Patrick Leahy	1964	Law	U.S. senator from Vermont, 1975–2023; president pro tempore of the United States Senate, 2012–15	
George LeMieux	1994	Law	U.S. senator from Florida, 2009–11	
Stephen Mallory II	1869	Col	U.S. senator from Florida, 1897–1907; member of the United States House of Representatives, 1891–95	
William Duhurst Merrick			U.S. senator from Maryland, 1838–45	
George J. Mitchell	1961	Law	U.S. senator from Maine, 1980–95; Senate majority leader, 1989–95; deputy president pro tempore of the United States Senate, 1987–89; judge, United States District Court for the District of Maine, 1979–80; U.S. special envoy for Northern Ireland, 1995–2001; chancellor of the Queen's University, Belfast, 1999–2009; U.S. special envoy for Middle East Peace, 2009–11; chairman of the Disney Company, 2004–07	
Joseph Montoya	1938	Law	U.S. senator from New Mexico, 1964–77; member of the United States House of Representatives, 1957–64; lieutenant governor of New Mexico, 1955–57, 1947–51	
Lisa Murkowski	1980	Col	U.S. senator from Alaska, 2002–present	
Joseph C. O'Mahoney	1920	Law	U.S. senator from Wyoming, 1934–53	
Jon Ossoff	2009	SFS	U.S. senator from Georgia, 2021–present	
William N. Roach		Col	U.S. senator from North Dakota, 1893–99	
Daniel Sullivan	1993, 1993	MSFS, Law	U.S. senator from Alaska, 2015–present; attorney general of Alaska, 2009–10; Assistant Secretary of State for Economic and Business Affairs, 2006–09	
Chris Van Hollen	1990	Law	U.S. senator from Maryland, 2017–present; chairman of the Democratic Senatorial Campaign Committee, 2017–2019; U.S. representative from Maryland, 2003–2017; chairman of the Democratic Congressional Campaign Committee, 2007–11	
James H. Webb	1975	Law	United States senator from Virginia, 2007–13; U.S. Secretary of the Navy, 1987–88	

==== U.S. representatives ====
This includes members of the United States House of Representatives.

Name	Class year	School/ degree	Notability	Reference
Claude I. Bakewell	1932	Col	United States representative from Missouri, 1947–49, 1951–53	
William Brockman Bankhead	1895	Law	Speaker of the United States House of Representatives, 1936–40; United States representative from Alabama, 1917–40	
Bob Barr	1977	Law	United States representative from Georgia, 1995–2003	
George A. Bartlett	1894	Law	United States representative from Nevada, 1907–11	
Herbert H. Bateman	1956	Law	United States representative from Virginia, 1983–2000	
Robert Bauman	1959	SFS	United States representative from Maryland, 1973–81	
Thomas J. Bliley Jr.	1952	Col	United States representative from Virginia, 1981–2001	
Bruce F. Caputo	1971	Law	United States representative from New York, 1977–79	
Don Cazayoux	1991	Law	United States representative from Louisiana, 2008–09	
David Cicilline	1986	Law	United States representative from Rhode Island, 2011–23	
Hansen Clarke	1987	Law	United States representative from Michigan, 2011–13	
Charles R. Clason	1914	Law	United States representative from Massachusetts, 1937–49	
L. Gary Clemente	1931	Law	United States representative from New York, 1949–53	
Henry Cuellar	1974	SFS	United States representative from Texas, 2005–present	
Charles F. Curry Jr.	1918	Law	United States representative from California, 1931–33	
John Delaney	1988	Law	United States representative from Maryland, 2013–2019; co-founder and CEO of CapitalSource	
Chris Deluzio	2013	Law	United States representative from Pennsylvania, 2023–present	
Matthew Denver	1892	Col	United States representative from Ohio, 1907–1913	
Debbie Dingell	1975, 1998	SFS, SCE	United States representative from Michigan, 2015–present; president of the General Motors Foundation	
John Dingell	1949, 1952	Col, Law	Dean of the United States House of Representatives, 1995–2015; United States representative from Michigan, 1965–2015; longest serving House member in history	
Dennis D. Donovan	1895	Law	United States representative from Ohio, 1888–95	
John J. Douglass	1896	Law	United States representative from Massachusetts, 1925–35	
Robert F. Drinan, S.J.	1949, 1951	Law, LL.M.	United States representative from Massachusetts, 1971–81; first Roman Catholic Jesuit priest to serve as a voting Member of Congress; Georgetown Law professor	
James P. B. Duffy	1901	Col	U.S. representative from New York, 1935–37	
Ed Edmonson	1947	Law	U.S. representative from Oklahoma, 1953–73	
Henry A. Edmundson	1947	Law	U.S. representative from Virginia, 1849–61	
Lane Evans	1978	Law	U.S. representative from Illinois, 1983–2007	
Charles J. Faulkner	1822	Col	U.S. representative from Virginia, 1851–59; U.S. representative from West Virginia, 1875–77; U.S. minister to France, 1860–61	
Mike Ferguson	1995	MPP	U.S. representative from New Jersey, 2001–09	
John R. Foley	1947	Law	U.S. representative from Maryland, 1959–61	
Ellsworth Foote	1923	Law	U.S. representative from Connecticut, 1947–49	
Jeff Fortenberry	1986	MPP	U.S. representative from Nebraska, 2005–22	
Lois Frankel	1973	Law	U.S. representative from Florida, 2013–present	
Martin Frost	1970	Law	U.S. representative from Texas, 1979–2005; president of America Votes	
Mike Gallagher	2013, 2015	SSP, Grad	U.S. representative from Wisconsin, 2017–24	
Mike Garcia	1998	SSP	U.S. representative from California, 2020–2025	
William Gaston	*	Col	U.S. representative from North Carolina, 1813–16; Georgetown College's first student; Gaston Hall is named after him; helped secure Georgetown University's federal charter	
Milton W. Glenn	1921–1922*	Col	U.S. representative from New Jersey, 1957–65	
George E. Gorman	1895	Law	U.S. representative from Illinois, 1913–15	
Leonard W. Hall	1920	Law	U.S. representative from New York, 1939–52; chairman of the Republican National Committee, 1953–57	
Forest Harness	1917	Law	U.S. representative from Indiana, 1939–49; Sergeant at Arms of the United States Senate, 1953–55	
Herbert Harris	1951	Law	U.S. representative from Virginia, 1975–81	
Burr Harrison	1926	Law	U.S. representative from Virginia, 1946–63	
Edward J. Hart	1924	Law	U.S. representative from New Jersey, 1935–55	
Stephanie Herseth Sandlin	1993, 1996, 1997	Col, Grad, Law	United States representative from South Dakota, 2004–11	
Lawrence Hogan	1949	Col	United States representative from Maryland, 1969–75	
Trey Hollingsworth	2014	MPP	United States representative from Indiana, 2017–23	
Steny Hoyer	1966	Law	United States representative from Maryland, 1981–present; chairman of the House Democratic Caucus, 1989–95; House majority leader, 2007–2011, 2019–2023; House minority whip, 2003–07, 2011–2019	
Henry Hyde	1947	Col	U.S. representative from Illinois, 1975–2007	
Michael L. Igoe	1908	Law	U.S. representative from Illinois, 1935; judge of the United States District Court for the Northern District of Illinois, 1939–65	
Pramila Jayapal	1986	Col	United States representative from Washington, 2017–present	
William J. Jefferson	1996	Law	United States representative from Louisiana, 1991–09; convicted of ten corruption charges	
Hakeem Jeffries	1994	SPP	United States representative from New York, 2013–present; House minority leader, 2023–present	
Patrick J. Kennedy	*		United States representative from Rhode Island, 1995–2011; chairman of the Democratic Congressional Campaign Committee, 1999–2001; son of Ted Kennedy	
Paul J. Kilday	1922	Law	United States representative from Texas, 1939–61; judge of the United States Court of Military Appeals, 1961–68	
Ann McLane Kuster	1984	Law	United States representative from New Hampshire, 2013–present	
John W. Langley	1895	Law	United States representative from Kentucky, 1903–13	
George Swinton Legaré		Law	United States representative from South Carolina, 1903–13	
Asbury Francis Lever	1901	Law	United States representative from South Carolina, 1901–19	
Ted Lieu	1994	Law	United States representative from California, 2015–present	
Dan Lungren	1971	Law	United States representative from California, 2005–13	
Sydney Emanuel Mudd II	1906, 1909	Col, Law	United States representative from Maryland, 1915–24	
Stephanie Murphy	2004	MSFS	United States representative from Florida, 2017–23	
Charlie Norwood	1969	Dent	United States representative from Georgia, 1995–2007	
Glenn Nye	1996	SFS	United States representative from Virginia, 2009–11	
Jerry J. O'Connell	1934	Col	United States representative from Montana, 1937–39	
Patrick B. O'Sullivan	1909	Col	United States representative from Connecticut, 1923–25	
James T. Patterson	1933	Col	United States representative from Connecticut, 1947–59	
August Pfluger	2019	MSB	United States representative from Texas, 2021–present	
Stacey Plaskett	1988	SFS	United States Delegate from the United States Virgin Islands, 2015–present	
William R. Ratchford	1959	Law	United States representative from Connecticut, 1979–85	
William S. Reyburn	1904	Law	United States representative from Pennsylvania, 1911–13	
Charles Risk	1922	Law	United States representative from Rhode Island, 1935–37, 1939–41	
Angelo D. Roncallo	1953	Law	United States representative from New York, 1973–75	
Pat Ryan	2013	SSP	United States representative from New York, 2022–present	
Antoni Sadlak	1931	Law	United States representative from Connecticut, 1947–59	
Derek Schmidt	1996	Law	United States representative from Kansas, 2015–present; attorney general of Kansas, 2011–2023	
Joe Sempolinski	2005	Col	United States representative from New York, 2022–23	
Philip R. Sharp	1964	SFS	United States representative from Indiana, 1975–95; president of Resources for the Future, 2005–present	
Mikie Sherrill	2007	Law	U.S. representative from New Jersey, 2019–present	
J. William Stanton	1949	SFS	United States representative from Ohio, 1965–83	
Bryan Steil	2003	MSB	United States representative from Wisconsin, 2019–present	
William R. Thom	1916	Law	United States representative from Ohio, 1933–39, 1941–43, 1945–47	
Lori Trahan	1995	SFS	United States representative from Massachusetts, 2019–present	
Clarence D. Van Duzer	1893	Law	United States representative from Nevada, 1903–07	
Pete Visclosky	1982	Law	United States representative from Indiana, 1985–2023	
Charles S. Voorhees	1873	Col	United States delegate from the Washington Territory, 1885–89	
Rick White	1980	Law	United States representative from Washington, 1995–99	
Frank Wolf	1965	Law	United States representative from Virginia, 1981–2015	
Albert Wynn	1977	Law	United States representative from Maryland, 1993–2008	

=== Other U.S. political figures ===
Name	Class year	School/ degree	Notability	Reference
Sam Arora	2010	Law	Member of the Maryland House of Delegates, 2011–15	
Kristina Arriaga	2007	M.A.	Commissioner of the U.S. Commission on International Religious Freedom, 2016—2019	
Robert Baer	1976	SFS	Author; the movie Syriana was based on two of his books; intelligence commentator; CIA case handler	
Jarrett Barrios	1995	Law	President of the American Red Cross Los Angeles Chapter; president of the Gay and Lesbian Alliance Against Defamation; member of the Massachusetts Senate, 2003–07	
Kumar P. Barve	1979	Med	Majority leader of the Maryland House of Delegates, 2002–2015; member of the Maryland House of Delegates, 1991–present	
Jeremy Bash	1993	Col	Chief of staff to Leon Panetta at the Department of Defense and CIA	
Gary Bauer	1973	Law	President of the Family Research Council, 1988–99; founder of the Campaign for Working Families PAC	
Rubén Berríos	1961	MSB	President of the Puerto Rican Independence Party; honorary president of the Socialist International; elected to the Puerto Rico Senate, 1973–77, 1985–89, 1997–2000	
Andy Billig	1990	Col	Majority leader of the Washington State Senate, 2019–present; member of the Washington State Senate, 2013–present; member of the Washington House of Representatives, 2011–13; Co-owner of the Spokane Indians	
Jesus Borja	1974	Law	Lieutenant governor of the Northern Mariana Islands, 1994–98	
John Chiang	1987	Law	California state treasurer, 2015–2019; California state controller, 2007–15	
Ian Conyers	2010, 2015	COL, SCS	Michigan Senate, 2016–18	
Michael Delaney	1994	Law	New Hampshire attorney general, 2009–15	
John E. Develin	1840	Col	Member of the New York State Assembly, 1846–1847, 1867	
Daniel Carroll Digges	1888	Col	Member of the Maryland House of Delegates, 1849; founding member of the Philodemic Society	
John Farmer Jr.	1979, 1986	Col, Law	New Jersey attorney general, 1999–2002; acting governor of New Jersey, 2002	
James Fishback	Did not graduate	Col	Candidate in the 2026 Florida gubernatorial election	
James Freis	1992	GOVT	Global fraud expert and former director of the Financial Crimes Enforcement Network (FinCEN)	
Frank Gaffney	1975	SFS	President and founder of the Center for Security Policy	
Sam Greco	2015 2019	SFS Law	Member of the Florida House of Representatives from the 19th district, commissioned officer in the U.S. Navy JAG Corps	
David G. Greenfield	2001	Law	Member of the New York City Council, 2010–2017; CEO of the Metropolitan Council On Jewish Poverty, 2019–present	
Neil Hartigan	1959	Col	Lieutenant Governor of Illinois, 1973–77; Attorney General of Illinois, 1983–91; Judge of the Illinois First District Appellate Court, 2002–04; Judge of the Illinois Court of Claims, 2013–19	
James E. Held	1964	Law	Member of the Wisconsin State Assembly, 1966–67	
Derek Hodge	1971	Law	Lieutenant governor of the United States Virgin Islands, 1987–95	
Jason Kander	2005	Law	Missouri Secretary of State, 2013–17; member of the Missouri House of Representatives, 2009–13	
Jacqueline Kennedy Onassis	1954*	SCE	First Lady of the United States, 1961–63	
Lane Kirkland	1948	SFS	President of the AFL–CIO, 1979–95	
Timothy Kraft	1967	Grad	Campaign manager for President Jimmy Carter in 1980	
Dan Kubiak			Member of the Texas House of Representatives, 1969–83, 1991–98	
Tony Labranche	2025	Col	Member of the New Hampshire House of Representatives, 2020-2022	
Sam A. LeBlanc III	1960	MSB	Member of the Louisiana House of Representatives, 1972–80; temporary judge on the U.S. Court of Appeals for the Fifth Circuit, New Orleans attorney	
Bryan Lentz	1986	BA	Member of the Pennsylvania House of Representatives, District 161, 2007–2010	
Joseph J. Lhota	1976	MSB	Deputy mayor for Operations of City of New York, 1998–2002; chairman and CEO of the New York Metropolitan Transportation Authority, 2011–12	
Lisa Madigan	1988	Col	Attorney general of Illinois, 2003–present	
Agnes Mary Mansour	1963	Grad	Director of the Michigan Department of Social Services, 1982–87; Sister of Mercy nun who resigned her vows to remain in political office	
Deborah Markowitz	1987	Law	Vermont secretary of state, 1998–2011	
William Joseph McDonough	1962	Grad	President of the Federal Reserve Bank of New York, 1993–2003; vice chairman of Merrill Lynch	
Maeve Kennedy McKean	2009	Grad	Senior advisor for Human Rights to the United States Department of State's Global AIDS program and to the U.S. Department of Health and Human Services' Office of Global Affairs	
Marc Morial	1983	Law	Mayor of New Orleans, Louisiana, 1994–2002; president of the National Urban League, 2003–present	
John P. O'Brien		Law, LL.M.	Mayor of New York City, 1933	
Ralph Oman	1973	Law	Register of Copyrights, 1985–94	
Esam Omeish	1989, 1992	Col, Med	President of the Muslim American Society, 2004–08; member of the board of directors of Dar Al-Hijrah mosque	
J. Frank Raley			Member of the Maryland Senate, 1963–66; member of the Maryland House of Delegates, 1955–59	
Elliot G. Sander	1978	SFS	Executive director and CEO of the New York Metropolitan Transportation Authority, 2007–09; commissioner of the New York City Department of Transportation, 1994–96	
Jenny Sanford	1984	MSB	First Lady of South Carolina; investment banker; campaign manager	
Sami Scheetz	Sometime 2010s	GOVT	Member of the Iowa House of Representatives, 2023–present	
John Sears	1963	Law	Campaign manager for Ronald Reagan's in 1976 and 1980	
Robert Shrum	1965	Col	Democratic political consultant	
Sheila Simon	1987	Law	Lieutenant governor of Illinois, 2011–15	
Edmond L. Smith	1849		Member of the Pennsylvania House of Representatives, 1858–59; member of the Colorado Territorial Legislative Assembly, 1875	
Michael Steele	1991	Law	Chairman of the Republican National Committee, 2009–11; lieutenant governor of Maryland, 2003–07	
Donald K. Stitt	1977	Law	Chairman of the Republican Party of Wisconsin, 1988–89; member of the Wisconsin State Senate, 1984–93; member of the Wisconsin State Assembly, 1979–84	
Caren Z. Turner	1985	Law	Co-chairwoman of the super-PAC Ready for Hillary; CEO of Turner GPA	
Cyrus Vance Jr.	1982	Law	New York County district attorney, 2010–present	
Mark Vargo	1988	Law	Attorney general of South Dakota, 2022–present	
Joe Slade White	1971	Grad	Democratic political consultant	

=== Other government officials outside the United States ===
Name	Class year	School/ degree	Notability	Reference
Ziad Abu Amr	1980, 1986	Grad, Grad	Minister of foreign affairs of the Palestinian National Authority, 2007	
Lina Annab			Minister of tourism and antiquities in Jordan	
Shlomo Argov	1952	SFS	Israeli ambassador to the United Kingdom, 1979–82; Israeli ambassador to the Netherlands, 1977–79; Israeli ambassador to Mexico, 1971–74	
Ricardo Alberto Arias	1961	SFS	Ambassador of Panama to the United Nations, 2004–09; ambassador of Panama to the U.S., 1994–96; minister of foreign affairs of Panama, 1996–98	
Giorgi Baramidze	1998–1999	SFS Fellow	State minister for Euro-Atlantic Integration of Georgia, 2004–12; minister of internal affairs of Georgia, 2003–04; minister of defense of Georgia, 2004	
Agustín Barrios Gómez	1993	SFS	Member of the Mexican Chamber of Deputies, 2012–2015	
Mohammed Dewji	1998	MSB	Member of the National Assembly of Tanzania, 2005–15	
Simcha Dinitz	1953	SFS	Israeli ambassador to the United States, 1973–79; political advisor to Prime Minister Golda Meir, 1969–73; member of the Knesset, 1984–88	
Stéphane Dujarric	1988	SFS	Spokesperson for United Nations Secretaries-General Ban Ki-moon, Kofi Annan and António Guterres	
Francis Escudero	1996	Law	Member of the Philippines Senate, 2007–present; minority floor leader of the Philippines House of Representatives, 2004–07; member of the Philippines House of Representatives, 1998–2007	
Sadegh Ghotbzadeh	1959–1963*	SFS	Minister of foreign affairs of Iran, 1979–80	
Aminta Granera Sacasa	1970s	Col	Director of the National Police of Nicaragua, 2006–16	
Jorge Guajardo	1993	SFS	Ambassador of Mexico to China	
Yehoyada Haim	1972, 1975	Grad, Grad	Ambassador of Israel to China, 2002–07; ambassador of Israel to India, 1995–2000	
Adel al-Jubeir	1983	Grad	Minister of foreign affairs of Saudi Arabia, 2015–present; Kingdom of Saudi Arabia ambassador to the U.S., 2007–15	
Nasser Judeh	1983	SFS	Deputy prime minister of Jordan, 2015–2017; Jordanian minister of foreign affairs, 2009–2017	
Eugen Jurzyca	1993	SFS	Minister of Education of Slovakia, 2010–present; member of the National Council of Slovakia, 2010–present	
Taro Kono	1985	SFS	Minister of Foreign Affairs of Japan, 2017–present	
Samuel Lewis Navarro	1979	Col	First vice president of Panama, 2004–09; Panamanian Minister of Foreign Affairs, 2004–09	
Alfonso López Caballero	1967	SFS	Ambassador of Colombia to the United Kingdom, 2002–06; Minister of the Interior of Colombia, 1998; Ambassador of Colombia to Canada, 1994–98; Minister of Agriculture of Colombia, 1991–93; Ambassador of Colombia to France, 1990–91; senator of Colombia, 1990; member of the Chamber of Representatives of Colombia, 1986–90	
John Lynch-Staunton	1953	SFS	Member of the Senate of Canada, 1990–2005; first leader of the Conservative Party of Canada, 2003–04	
Amin Mahmoud	1972		Minister of higher education and scientific research of Jordan, 2013–15; Minister of Culture of Jordan, 1993–94, 2005; member of the Jordanian Senate, 2010–11, 2015	
Ismael Moreno Pino	1952	SFS	Jurist and career diplomat; served as undersecretary for multilateral affairs (1964–65) and assistant secretary of state for international organization affairs (1960–64) in the Ministry of Foreign Affairs of Mexico; served as ambassador of Mexico in Germany and the Netherlands	
Sadako Ogata	1953	MSFS	United Nations high commissioner for refugees, 1991–2001; president of the Japan International Cooperation Agency, 2003–12; chairman of the UNICEF Executive Board	
Yousef Al Otaiba	1995	SFS	United Arab Emirates ambassador to the United States, 2008–present	
Kasit Piromya	1971	Col	Foreign minister of the Kingdom of Thailand, 2008–11; ambassador of Thailand to the US, 2004–06; ambassador of Thailand to Japan, 2001–03; ambassador of Thailand to Germany, 1997–2001; ambassador of Thailand to the Soviet Union, 1991–93; ambassador of Thailand to Indonesia, 1994–96	
Oussama Romdhani			Minister of communications of Tunisia, 2009–12; Fulbright scholar	
James Soong	1974	Law	Chairman of the People First Party of the Republic of China, 2000–present; first governor of Taiwan Province, 1993–98; head of the Government Information Office, 1979–84	
Bruno Stagno Ugarte	1991	SFS	Minister of Foreign Affairs of Costa Rica, 2006–10; ambassador of Costa Rica to the United Nations, 2002–06; president, Assembly of States Parties of the International Criminal Court	
Zev Sufott		Grad	First ambassador of Israel to China, ambassador of Israel to the Netherlands	
Carlos Tello Macías	1958	MSB	Ambassador of Mexico to Cuba, Portugal, and Russia; director-general, Bank of Mexico, 1982;sSecretary of Budget and Planning of Mexico, 1976–77	
Ong Keng Yong	1983	Grad	Secretary-general of the Association of Southeast Asian Nations, 2003–07; ambassador and high commissioner of Singapore to India and Nepal, 1996–98	
Kateryna Yushchenko	1982	SFS	First Lady of Ukraine, 2005–10 (wife of Ukraine President Viktor Yushchenko)	
Anthony Winza Probowo	2016	LL.M	Member of the Parliament of Jakarta (Indonesia), secretary of the Indonesia Solidarity Party Fraction	

== Entertainment ==
=== Film, television, and theater ===
Name	Class year	School/ degree	Notability	Reference
Kary Antholis	1989	Law	President of HBO miniseries and Academy Award-winning documentary filmmaker	
Pearl Bailey	1985	Col	Singer and actress; winner of the Tony Award, Daytime Emmy Award, and Screen Actors Guild Life Achievement Award; recipient of the Presidential Medal of Freedom	
John Barrymore	1895–1897*	Col	Actor	
Zal Batmanglij	2001	Col	Director and screenwriter	
Tarak Ben Ammar	1970	SFS	Franco-Tunisian film producer	
Michael Benz	2004	Col	Actor	
Bruce Berman	1978	Law	Chairman and CEO of Village Roadshow Pictures	
Eileen Brennan	Sometime 1950s	Col	Actress known for Private Benjamin, for which she received an Academy Award nomination	
Mike Cahill	2005	Col	Director and screenwriter	
Bradley Cooper	1997	Col	Filmmaker with 12 Academy Award nominations as an actor, writer, and producer; winner of 3 Grammy Awards; nominated for a Tony Award and 6 Golden Globes	
Lucy Barzun Donnelly	1995	Col	Producer of Grey Gardens; winner of an Emmy Award, a Golden Globe Award, and a TCA Award	
Margaret Edson	1992	Grad	Pulitzer Prize-winning playwright known for Wit	
Joey Fallon	c. 1963		Child actor, portrayed the kidnap victim in "Fearful Decision" and Tom Sawyer to Eileen Heckart's Aunt Polly in an episode of Campbell Television Playhouse	
Robert Gant	1993	Law	Actor	
Pia Getty		Col	Independent filmmaker	
John Guare	1960	Col	Playwright known for The House of Blue Leaves, Six Degrees of Separation, and Landscape of the Body. A five-time Tony Award-nominee, in 1972 he won Best Book of a Musical for Two Gentlemen of Verona. Also nominated for the Academy Award for Best Original Screenplay for Atlantic City (1980 film).	
Jack Hofsiss	1971	Col	Broadway director known for The Elephant Man, for which he won the 1979 Tony Award for Best Direction of a Play.	
Mitchell Hurwitz	1985	Col	Television writer and producer; creator of Arrested Development; co-creator of The Ellen Show	
Nick Kroll	2001	Col	Actor and comedian known for his role in The League and starring in the Kroll Show	
Wilton Lackaye	1914	Grad	Early stage and film actor; first portrayed the character of Svengali	
Malcolm D. Lee	1992	Col	Director known for Undercover Brother and The Best Man	
Willard Mack	1889	Col	Canadian actor, director, and playwright	
Brit Marling	2005	Col	Actress and screenwriter	
Marilyn Milian	1984	Law	Star and judge of The People's Court; former Florida circuit court judge	
Andrew Morrison	2015	Col	Academy Award-nominated producer, winner of the Golden Globe Award for Best Motion Picture – Drama for The Brutalist	
Don Murphy	1984	MSB	Producer known for Transformers, Transformers: Revenge of the Fallen, and Natural Born Killers	
Megan Mylan	1992	SFS	Documentary director known for Smile Pinki; winner of the Academy Award for Best Short Subject Documentary	
Jonathan Nolan	1999	Col	Academy Award-nominated screenwriter for Memento; co-wrote Interstellar and The Dark Knight; creator of Westworld	
Gene Quintano	1967	Col	Director, writer, and producer	
Carl Reiner	1943	SFS	Actor, director, writer, and producer; winner of nine Emmy Awards and one Grammy Award	
Kelly Rohrbach	2012	Col	Actress	
RaMell Ross	2005	Col	Director and co-writer of Nickel Boys, nominated for the Academy Award for Best Adapted Screenplay	
Michael Sucsy	1995	SFS	Golden Globe Award and Emmy Award-winning director and writer known for Grey Gardens	
Jim Whitaker	1990	Col	Film producer and Peabody Award-winning documentarian known for Rebirth, Take Me Home Tonight, and A Wrinkle in Time.	
Chris Williams	1989	Col	Actor	
David Yates	1987		Director known for four Harry Potter films	
John Ziegler	1989	Col	Former talk show host on KFI; documentary writer and director	

=== Literature ===
Name	Class year	School/ degree	Notability	Reference
Melissa Anelli	2001	Col	New York Times bestselling author and webmaster of The Leaky Cauldron	
William Peter Blatty	1950	Col	Author of novel The Exorcist with two Academy Award nominations as producer and screenwriter of the film adaptation, winning the Oscar in the latter category.	
Joseph Bottum	1983	Col	Author, poet, and public intellectual; contributing editor of The Weekly Standard	
Bob Colacello	1969	SFS	Noted biographer	
Charles Patton Dimitry	1867	Grad	Creole journalist, poet, and author known for The House in Balfour Street	
John Bull Smith Dimitry	1867	Grad	Creole author known for Le Tombeau Blanc	
Michael Dorris	1967	Col	Author of A Yellow Raft in Blue Water and The Broken Cord, for which he won the National Book Critics Circle Award for General Nonfiction	
Paul Erdman	1955	SFS	Financial author and Edgar Award-winning fiction novelist	
John T. Flynn	1902	Law	Author of 20 books, including The Road Ahead: America's Creeping Revolution; columnist for The New Republic; outspoken opponent of the New Deal and the United States' entry into World War II	
Iris Krasnow	1997	Grad	Author specializing in relationships and personal growth	
R. F. Kuang	2018	SFS	Fiction writer known for The Poppy War, Yellowface, and Babel, the latter of which won the Nebula Award in 2022. Studied Chinese history, culture, and literature at Oxford and Cambridge as a Marshall Scholar.	
J. D. McClatchy		Col	Poet; editor of The Yale Review; president of the American Academy of Arts and Letters	
Dinaw Mengestu	2000	Col	Award-winning novelist known for The Beautiful Things That Heaven Bears; Lannan Chair of Poetics at Georgetown University; MacArthur Fellow	
Glenn O'Brien	1970	Col	Author on fashion and style; the "Style Guy" for GQ Magazine	
Greg Olear	1995	Col	Novelist known for Los Angeles Times bestseller Fathermucker	
James Ryder Randall	1859*	Col	Poet known for authoring "Maryland, My Maryland", the official state song of Maryland	
James Riley	1999	Col	Author of the award-winning Story Thieves, Half Upon a Time, and Revenge of Magic series	
David Schickler	1991	SFS	Author and screenwriter known for The Dark Path and co-creating the television series Banshee	

=== Music, art, and comedy ===
Name	Class year	School/ degree	Notability	Reference
Amerie	2000	Col	Rhythm and blues singer	
Bob Bates	1975	Col	Computer game designer	
Mike Birbiglia	2000	Col	Comedian	
Jeff Civillico	2005	Grad	Juggler and comedian	
William Wilson Corcoran	1813–1814*	Col	Founder of the Corcoran Gallery of Art, Washington's first art museum	
Kate Cordsen	1992	GPPI	Photographer and contemporary artist	
Bill Danoff	1968	SLL	Grammy Award-winning singer and songwriter best known for "Afternoon Delight"	
Michael Dellaira	1971	Col	Composer of classical music	
Jim Gaffigan	1988	MSB	Stand-up comedian and actor; star of The Jim Gaffigan Show	
Keith Kane	1992	Grad	Guitarist and songwriter, formerly with Vertical Horizon	
John Mulaney	2004	Col	Stand-up comedian; writer for Saturday Night Live	
James Murray	1998	Col	Comedian and star of Impractical Jokers	
Deborah Nehmad	1982	Law	Attorney and artist	
Jacqueline Novak	2004	Col	Stand-up comedian, actor, writer, and author	
Guy Picciotto	1988	Col	Guitarist for rock band Fugazi; former lead singer and guitarist for Rites of Spring	
Gerome Ragni	*	Col	Musician and co-author known for Hair	
Matt Scannell	1992	Grad	Musician and founding member of Vertical Horizon	
Benito Skinner	2016	Col	Actor and comedian	
James Johnson Sweeney	1922	Col	Director of the Solomon R. Guggenheim Museum, 1952–60; curator of the Museum of Modern Art, 1935–46	
Will Tanous	1992	Col	Music industry executive for Universal Music Group and Warner Music Group; co-creator of HBO's Reverb	
Jenny Toomey	1989	MSB	Indie rock musician and arts activist	

== Journalism and media ==
Name	Class year	School/ degree	Notability	Reference
Guy Adami	1986	MSB	Television personality on CNBC	
Jack Anderson	1947*	Col	Investigative journalist; winner of the Pulitzer Prize for National Reporting	
Bruce Bartlett	1976	Grad	Economist, author, and Wall Street Journal columnist	
Jason Bellini	1997	Col	Journalist	
Michelle Bernard	1989	Law	Political and legal analyst on MSNBC; president and CEO of the Bernard Center for Women, Politics & Public Policy	
John Bersia	1979	Grad	Pulitzer Prize-winning journalist; University Professor at the University of Central Florida	
Joan Biskupic	1993	Law	Supreme Court reporter for USA Today and The Washington Post	
David G. Bradley	1983	Law	Chairman and owner of Atlantic Media; founder of the Advisory Board Company and CEB Inc.	
Isabel Brown	1997		Conservative political activist, media personality, political commentator, and author	
Chris Cillizza	1998	Col	CNN political commentator; former political reporter for The Washington Post	
Robert J. Collier	1894	Col	Editor of Collier's Weekly magazine (founded by his father); president of the Aero Club of America; married the granddaughter of William Astor	
George Crile III	1968	SFS	CBS News producer (60 Minutes and 60 Minutes II) and reporter; twice awarded the Edward R. Murrow Award by the Overseas Press Club; author of the 2003 bestseller Charlie Wilson's War	
Lyle Denniston	1957	Grad	Legal journalist known for covering the Supreme Court for SCOTUSblog, The Wall Street Journal, and The Boston Globe; professor at Georgetown Law Center	
Bonnie Erbé	1987	Law	Journalist and host of To the Contrary	
Jamie Gangel	1977	SFS	CNN special correspondent; National correspondent on NBC's The Today Show	
Lourdes Garcia-Navarro	1994	SFS	Foreign correspondent with the National Public Radio; winner of the Edward R. Murrow Award and Peabody Award	
Jeffrey Gedmin	1990	Grad	President of Radio Free Europe/Radio Liberty, 2007–11; president of the Londgon-based Legatum Institute, 2011–14; senior fellow at Georgetown University and the Institute for Strategic Dialogue	
Stephen Glass	2001	Law	Journalist at The New Republic known for fabricating numerous stories	
Linda Gradstein	1985	SFS	Correspondent with NPR, and PRI's The World	
Savannah Guthrie	2000	Grad	Journalist and former White House correspondent; co-anchor of Today	
Peter Hamby	2003	Col	Head of News at Snapchat; host of Good Luck America; former CNN political reporter; author of "Did Twitter Kill The Boys On The Bus?", winner of the Edward R. Murrow Award	
Daniel Henninger	1968	SFS	Deputy editorial page director of The Wall Street Journal; contributor on Fox News	
Quin Hillyer	1986	Col	Senior editorial writer for The Washington Times; contributor to numerous publications and news stations	
Paul Janensch	1960	Col	Former executive editor of The Courier-Journal	
Mary Jordan	1983	Col	Journalist for The Washington Post; winner of the Pulitzer Prize for International Reporting	
Laura Kuenssberg	1999	Grad	Award-winning British political journalist; became first female political editor of the BBC in 2015, one of the highest profile roles in British journalism	
Mark Landler	1987	SFS	White House correspondent, former European economic correspondent, and Hong Kong bureau chief for The New York Times	
Monica Langley	1983	Law	Senior special writer for The Wall Street Journal	
Tara McKelvey	1985	Col	Correspondent for Newsweek and The Daily Beast	
Deroy Murdock	1986	Col	Columnist for the Scripps Howard News Service; contributing editor to the National Review	
Condé Montrose Nast	1894, 1895	Col, Grad	Founder of Condé Nast, which publishes Vanity Fair, Vogue, and The New Yorker; first president of Georgetown's student government, The Yard (predecessor to the Georgetown University Student Association)	
Miles O'Brien	1981	Col	Science and technology broadcast journalist for CNN	
Timothy L. O'Brien	1984	Col	Author; former Sunday Business editor for The New York Times and editorial board member of Bloomberg View of Bloomberg News	
Norah O'Donnell	1996, 2003	Col, Grad	Co-anchor of CBS This Morning; former Chief White House Correspondent for CBS News	
Walter Pincus	2001	Law	Pulitzer Prize, Emmy Award, and Polk Award-winning national security journalist for The Washington Post	
Shirley Povich	1922–1923*	Law	Sports editor at The Washington Post for 41 years; winner of the J. G. Taylor Spink Award	
Frank J. Prial	1951	Col	The New York Times wine columnist and author	
Martin Quigley Jr.	1939	Col	Publisher of film magazines and co-author of the Motion Picture Production Code; spy for the United States Office of Strategic Services in Ireland during World War II; twice-elected mayor of Larchmont, New York	
Walter Ratliff	2004	SCS	Emmy Award-winning documentary director; reporter for the Associated Press	
Sumner Redstone	1944*	Law	Media executive; chairman and owner of National Amusements, the parent corporation of CBS Corporation and Viacom	
Maria Shriver	1977	Col	Anchor for NBC News; winner of two Emmy Awards and a Peabody Award for coverage of the 1988 Summer Olympics and for The Alzheimer's Project; former First Lady of California	
Kate Snow	1993	MSFS	Host of NBC Nightly News; co-host of the Good Morning America weekend edition	
Kara Swisher	1984	SFS	Technology columnist for The Wall Street Journal	
Lisa Sylvester	1992	SFS	Peabody Award and Emmy Award-winning reporter; previously on CNN's The Situation Room	
Anthony Thomopoulos	1959	SFS	President of ABC Entertainment and ABC Broadcast Group	
Greta Van Susteren	1979, 1982	Law, LL.M.	Fox News Channel anchor of On the Record w/ Greta Van Susteren	
Arick Wierson	1994	SFS	Former NYC Media general manager; former media advisor to New York City Mayor Michael Bloomberg	

== Law ==
Name	Class year	School/ degree	Notability	Reference
Jack Abramoff	1986	Law	In March 2006, sentenced to five years and 10 months in prison and ordered then to pay restitution of more than $21 million for defrauding American Indian tribes and corruption of public officials	
Robert S. Bennett	1961, 1964	Col, Law	Litigator; represented President Bill Clinton in the Lewinsky scandal	
Thomas Hale Boggs Jr.	1961, 1965	Col, Law	Co-founder of Patton Boggs LLP	
Plato Cacheris	1953, 1956	SFS, Law	Litigator who defended numerous high-profile clients	
Michael J. Callahan	1990	SFS	Executive vice president and general counsel of Yahoo	
James C. Duff	1981	Law	Director of the Administrative Office of the United States Courts, 2006–present; president of the Freedom Forum, which operates the Newseum, 2011–present	
Andrew G. Haley	1928	Law	World's first space lawyer; president of Aerojet General, 1942–45; a founder in 1960 of the International Academy of Astronautics and International Institute of Space Law; coined the term "metalaw" (laws applied to relations with alien intelligences)	
John Lauro	Unknown	Law	Representing former President Donald Trump in the pending federal case against him for attempting to overturn the results of the 2020 United States presidential election	
Peter McDonough	1979, 1982	Col, Law	General counsel of Princeton University; Republican New Jersey state legislator	
Jerome O'Neill	1968, 1971	Col, Law	U.S. attorney for Vermont	
Phil Preis	1975, 1976	Law, LL.M.	Candidate for governor of Louisiana in 1995 and 1999; Baton Rouge attorney	
Jane Sullivan Roberts	1984	Law	Partner at Pillsbury Winthrop; wife of Chief Justice John Roberts	
William Shea	1929	Col	Noted New York attorney and patriarch of the New York Mets; Shea Stadium named in his honor; name partner of Shea & Gould	
Stephen Edward Smith	1973, 1977	Col, Law	Vice president and general counsel, Lockheed Martin	
Helen Steinbinder	1955	LL.M.	First female law professor at Georgetown Law School	
Brendan Sullivan	1964, 1967	Col, Law	Senior partner at Williams & Connolly; litigator who defended Lt. Col. Oliver North during the Iran-Contra affair	
Genevievette Walker-Lightfoot	1995	Col	U.S. Securities and Exchange Commission attorney	
Edward Bennett Williams	1944	Law	Trial lawyer; attorney for The Washington Post and Georgetown University; owned the Washington Redskins and Baltimore Orioles; founder of Williams & Connolly	

== Royalty ==
Name	Class year	School/ degree	Notability	Reference
Pavlos, Crown Prince of Greece	1995	MSFS	First son of Constantine II of Greece and Crown Prince	
Bernhard, Prince of Orange-Nassau, van Vollenhoven	1988–1989*	COL	Member of the Dutch Royal Family, being nephew of the former Queen Beatrix of the Netherlands	
Guillaume, Prince of Luxembourg	1987	SFS	Third son and youngest child of Grand Duke Jean and Grand Duchess Josephine-Charlotte of Luxembourg	
Prince Turki Al Faisal	1968	SFS	Son of King Faisal; ambassador of Saudi Arabia to the U.S., 2005–07; ambassador of Saudi Arabia to the United Kingdom and Ireland, 2002–05; director of General Intelligence of Saudi Arabia, 1979–2001	
Prince Mohammed bin Nawwaf bin Abdulaziz	1981	SFS	Member of the House of Saud; ambassador of Saudi Arabia to the U.K. and Ireland, 2005–present; ambassador of Saudi Arabia to Italy and Malta, 1995–2005	
Prince Hashim bin Hussein	2005	SFS	The younger of the two sons of King Hussein and Queen Noor of Jordan, and half-brother of the reigning King Abdullah II of Jordan	
Hussein, Crown Prince of Jordan	2016	SFS	First son and heir apparent of King Abdullah II and Queen Rania of Jordan	
Prince Talal bin Muhammad	1989	SFS, Grad	The eldest son of Prince Muhammad bin Talal, the younger brother of King Hussein of Jordan, and the grandson of King Talal of Jordan	
Princess Talita von Fürstenberg			American socialite, fashion designer, and model; granddaughter of fashion designers Diane von Fürstenberg and Prince Egon von Fürstenberg and by birth a member of the House of Fürstenberg, an ancient German noble family	
Princess Ghida al-Talal	1986	SFS, Grad	Member of the House of Hashemites; chairperson of the King Hussein Cancer Foundation	
Agustín, Prince of Iturbide	1884	Col	Grandson of Don Agustín de Iturbide, the first Emperor of Mexico; became adopted son of Emperor Maximilian I and Empress Carlota of Mexico, of House of Habsburg, and as the Emperors had no children, he became heir to the throne; in exile (as Emperor Don Agustín III of Mexico, de jure) he taught Spanish and French at Georgetown for many years (died 1925)	
Prince Constantine-Alexios	2022	Col	First son of Crown Prince Pavlos and Crown Princess Marie-Chantal of Greece; model at Dior	
Mohammed bin Hamad bin Khalifa Al Thani	2009	SFS	Member of the Royal House of Thani, Sheikh of Qatar; brother of the Emir of Qatar - Sheikh Tamim bin Hamad Al Thani; son of the former Emir of Qatar, Sheikh Hamad bin Khalifa Al Thani	
Princess Iman bint Abdullah	2018	SFS	Princess of Jordan, member of the Hashemite family. Daughter of King Abdullah II of Jordan and Queen Rania of Jordan.	
Prince August Fredrik zu Sayn-Wittgenstein-Berleburg			Grandson of Prince Ludwig Ferdinand of Sayn-Wittgenstein-Berleburg	
Princess Noor Pahlavi	2014	Col	Granddaughter of Mohammad Reza Pahlavi, the last shah of Iran	
Prince Alfons of Liechtenstein			Grandson of Hans-Adam II, Prince of Liechtenstein	

== Science and medicine ==
Name	Class year	School/ degree	Notability	Reference
John O. Agwunobi	2000	MBA	U.S. assistant secretary for health and admiral in the United States Public Health Service Commissioned Corps, 2006–07; senior vice president and president of the Health and Wellness Division of Walmart, 2007–14	
John-David F. Bartoe	1974, 1976	Grad, Grad	NASA astronaut and astrophysicist; research manager for the International Space Station at the Johnson Space Center, 1995–present	
Lisa Bowleg	1988	Col	Professor of Applied Social Psychology	
Pascale Cossart	1971	Grad	Bacteriologist and head of the Unité des Interactions Bactéries Cellules at the Pasteur Institute; recipient of the 1998 Richard Lounsbery Award	
George Coyne	1962	Grad	Astronomer; director of the Vatican Observatory, 1978–2006	
David John Doukas	1983	Med	Tulane University; director of the Program in Medical Ethics and Human Values, James A. Knight Chair in Medical Humanities and Ethics, clinical ethicist, and family physician	
Mark R. Dybul	1985, 1992	Col, Med	U.S. global AIDS coordinator of the U.S. Department of State, 2006–09	
Dale R. Herspring	1967		Political scientist	
Lt. Gen. Kevin C. Kiley	1976	Med	Surgeon general of the U.S. Army and commander of U.S. Army Medical Command, 2004–07	
Ulrich Kortz	1995	Grad	Professor of chemistry at Jacobs University Bremen	
Alisha Kramer	2012	Col	Physician and health activist	
Antonia Novello	1975	W	Surgeon General of the United States, 1990–93	
Thomas Parran Jr.	1915	Med	Surgeon General of the United States, 1936–48	
Sean P. Pinney	1994	Med	Cardiologist; director of the Advanced Heart Failure and Cardiac Transplant Program and the Pulmonary Hypertension Program at Mount Sinai Hospital in New York City	
Robert R. Redfield	1973, 1977	Col, Med	Director of Centers for Disease Control and Prevention, 2018–present; Virologist and HIV researcher; professor of medicine at University of Maryland, Baltimore; co-founder of the Institute of Human Virology	
John J. Ring	1949, 1953	Col, Med	President of the American Medical Association, 1991–92	
Vera Rubin	1954	Med	Astronomer; recipient of numerous awards for work on galaxy rotation rates and dark matter; discovered the Rubin–Ford effect	
Solomon H. Snyder	1959, 1962	Col, Med	Neuroscientist; University Distinguished Service Professor of Psychiatry, Neurosciences, and Pharmacology at the Johns Hopkins University School of Medicine	
William Kennedy Smith	1991	Med	Member of the Advisory Neighborhood Commission; founder of the Center for International Rehabilitation and Physicians Against Land Mines; member of the Kennedy family; charged with rape in a nationally publicized 1991 trial	
Angelo Thrower	1989	Med	Dermatologist and company founder	
Andrew von Eschenbach	1967	Med	U.S. commissioner of food and drugs, 2006–09; director of the National Cancer Institute, 2002–05	

== Sports ==
=== Athletes ===
Name	Class year	School/ degree	Notability	Reference
Mike Altman	1997	SFS	Rower on the 2008 US Olympic team and US National Rowing team member; winner of three medals at the World Rowing Championships	
Al Blozis	1942	Col	Professional football player for the New York Giants; killed in action during World War II while searching alone for missing comrades in the Vosges Mountains of France; the New York Giants retired his number, 32	
Ruben Boumtje-Boumtje	2001	Col	Professional basketball player for the Portland Trail Blazers	
Alex Buzbee	2007	Col	Professional football player for the Washington Redskins	
Andrew Campbell	2006	SFS	Sailor on the 2008 U.S. Olympic team	
Harry Colliflower	1906	Col	Professional baseball player for the Cleveland Spiders and umpire; coach of the Georgetown varsity basketball team, 1911–14	
Patrick Ewing	1985	Col	Professional basketball player for the New York Knicks; inducted into the Basketball Hall of Fame in 2008	
Patrick Ewing Jr.	2008	Col	Professional basketball player for the Al Rayyan Basketball Team of the Qatari Basketball League	
Eric "Sleepy" Floyd	1982	Col	Professional basketball player for the Golden State Warriors and Houston Rockets	
Brendan Gaughan	1997	MSB	Professional racer for the NASCAR Xfinity Series and Camping World Truck Series	
Jeff Green	2004–2007*	Col	Professional basketball player for the Seattle SuperSonics Oklahoma City Thunder Boston Celtics Memphis Grizzlies and Los Angeles Clippers	
Othella Harrington	1996	Col	Professional basketball player for the Chicago Bulls	
Roy Hibbert	2008	Col	Professional basketball player for the Indiana Pacers and Los Angeles Lakers	
Nancy Hogshead-Makar	1997	Law	Three-time gold medalist swimmer on the 1984 U.S. Olympic team	
Allen Iverson	1995–1996*	Col	Professional basketball player for the Philadelphia 76ers	
Jaren Jackson	1989	MSB	Professional basketball player for the San Antonio Spurs	
Augie Lio	1941	Col	Professional football player for the Detroit Lions	
Al Matuza	1941	Col	Professional football player for the Chicago Bears	
Mac McClung	2018–2020*	Col	Professional basketball player for Bàsquet Girona, 3x NBA Slam Dunk Champion	
Kevin McMahon	1994	Col	Hammer thrower for the 1996 U.S. Olympic team and 2000 U.S. Olympic team	
Greg Monroe	2008–2009*	MSB	Professional basketball player for the Detroit Pistons and Milwaukee Bucks	
John Morelli	1943	Col	Professional football player for the Boston Yanks	
Alonzo Mourning	1992	Col	Professional basketball player for the Miami Heat	
Aimee Mullins	1998	SFS	Track and field athlete and chief of mission for the 2012 U.S. Olympic delegation; actress; fashion model and motivational speaker	
Dikembe Mutombo	1991	SLL	Professional basketball player for the Denver Nuggets and Houston Rockets	
Eamonn O'Reilly	1966	Col	Former American record-holder in the Boston Marathon	
Victor Page	1995–1997*	Col	NBA Development League basketball player for the Sioux Falls Skyforce	
Angelo Paternoster	1943	Col	Professional football player for the Washington Redskins	
George Perpich	1942	Col	Professional football player for the Washington Redskins	
Don Reid	1995	Col	Professional basketball player for the Detroit Pistons and Orlando Magic	
Jim Ricca	1951	Col	Professional football player for the Washington Redskins	
Vincent Sanford			Basketball player for Hapoel Galil Elyon of the Israeli Basketball Premier League	
Ed Skoronski	1931*	Col	Professional football player for the Pittsburgh Steelers	
James Strauch			Olympic fencer, and national champion	
Kyle Sweeney	2003	MSB	Professional lacrosse player in the National Lacrosse League and Major League Lacrosse; played for the U.S. Men's National Team in the 2006 World Lacrosse Championship and Team USA in the World Indoor Lacrosse Championship	
Mike Sweetney	2001–2003*	Col	Professional basketball player for the New York Knicks and Chicago Bulls	
Ingrid Wells	2011	Col	Professional soccer player for 1. FFC Turbine Potsdam and the United States women's national under-23 soccer team; played in the National Women's Soccer League	
Jahidi White	1998	Col	Professional basketball player for the Washington Wizards	
Jerome Williams	1996	Col	Professional basketball player for the New York Knicks	
Reggie Williams	1987	Col	Professional basketball player for the Los Angeles Clippers; 1983 Mr. Basketball USA	
David Wingate	1986	Col	Professional basketball player for the Philadelphia 76ers	

- Brandon Bowman, basketball player in the Israeli Liga Artzit
- Qudus Wahab (born 2000), basketball player for Maccabi Ashdod of the Israeli Basketball Premier League

=== Commissioners, owners, coaches, and managers ===
Name	Class year	School/ degree	Notability	Reference
Chris Antonetti	1996	MSB	President of baseball operations of the Cleveland Indians	
Bill Bidwill	1960	MSB	Owner of the Arizona Cardinals	
Walter Briggs Jr.	1934	Col	Owner of the Detroit Tigers	
Erin Dickerson Davis			College basketball coach	
Craig Esherick	1978, 1982	MSB, Law	Head coach of the Georgetown Hoyas men's basketball team; scout for the 1988 U.S. men's basketball team	
Martin Mayhew	2000	J.D., Law	American football player and executive	
Frank McCourt	1975	Col	Owner and manager of the Los Angeles Dodgers and Dodger Stadium; owner of the Los Angeles Marathon	
Jamie McCourt	1975	SLL	CEO and co-owner of the Los Angeles Dodgers; highest-ranked woman in Major League Baseball	
Mark Murphy	1988	Law	President and CEO of the Green Bay Packers; former safety in the NFL Pro Bowl; two-time Super Bowl Champion with the Washington Redskins	
Susan O'Malley	2007	Law	President of the Washington Wizards; first female president of an NBA franchise	
Carmen Policy	1966	Law	President and CEO of the San Francisco 49ers; president and CEO of the Cleveland Browns	
Jim Schwartz	1989	Col	Head coach of the Detroit Lions	
Michael Slive	1966	LL.M.	Commissioner of the Southeastern Conference	
Paul Tagliabue	1962	Col	Commissioner of the National Football League, 1989–2006; chairman of the Board of Directors of Georgetown University, 2009–2015; member of the National Italian American Sports Hall of Fame	
Jerry Vainisi		MSB	General manager of the Chicago Bears; chairman and CEO of Forest Park National Bank & Trust Co.	
Michael Vespoli	1968	Col	Head coach of the lightweight men of the 1979 U.S. National team; assistant coach of the heavyweight men of the 1980 U.S. Olympic team; rower for the champion 1972 U.S. Olympic team and 1974 World Rowing Championships team; founder and CEO of Vespoli USA	
Tom Walter	1991	Col	Head coach of the Wake Forest Demon Deacons baseball team	

== Fictional ==
Name	Notability	Reference
Sterling Archer	Title character in animated series Archer	
Prince Nasir Al-Subaai	Played by Alexander Siddig in Syriana	
Zoey Bartlet	President's daughter played by Elisabeth Moss in The West Wing	
Nick Howland	Popular boy and love interest of the protagonist, and Senior Class Vice President in Booksmart	
Robert Clayton Dean	Main character played by Will Smith in Enemy of the State	
Tracy Flick	Played by Reese Witherspoon in Election	
Alicia Florrick	Lead character played by Julianna Margulies in The Good Wife	
Will Gardner	Character played by Josh Charles in The Good Wife	
Benjamin Franklin Gates	Played by Nicolas Cage in the National Treasure franchise	
Spencer Hastings	Played by Troian Bellisario in Pretty Little Liars	
J.J. and Honey Huan	Characters in Doonesbury	
Jason Hudson	Character in the video game Call of Duty: Black Ops	
Brenda Leigh Johnson	Deputy Los Angeles Police Chief from the television series The Closer	
Matthew Kidman	Main character played by Emile Hirsch in The Girl Next Door	
Walter Larson and Haroon Raja	Main and recurring characters in The Brink	
Main characters	St. Elmo's Fire	
Chuck McGill	Played by Michael McKean in the television series Better Call Saul	
Larry Mora	Played by Danny Pino in the film adaptation of Dear Evan Hansen (film)	
Margaret "Maggie" O'Donnell	Played by Michelle Trachtenberg in 17 Again	
David Palmer	President of the United States played by Dennis Haysbert in 24	
Olivia Pope	Played by Kerry Washington in the television series Scandal	
Melanie Porter	Played by Raven-Symoné in College Road Trip	
Derek Reynolds	Played by Sean Patrick Thomas in Save the Last Dance	
Emily Rhodes	From Designated Survivor, played by Italia Ricci	
Jack Ryan	(Grad 1980); deputy director of the Central Intelligence and President of the United States in Tom Clancy novels	
Annie Walker	Main character in Covert Affairs	
Lawrence Walker	Character in Insecure played by Jay Ellis	
Declan Walsh	Protagonist in the 1979 novel The Vicar of Christ who served as Chief Justice of the United States and later Pope	
Kyle Lee Watson	Character played by Duane Martin in Above the Rim, who played for the Georgetown Hoyas basketball team under Coach John Thompson Jr.	
Charlie Young	President's personal aide played by Dulé Hill in The West Wing	

== See also ==
- List of Georgetown University faculty
- List of presidents of Georgetown University
- President and Directors of Georgetown College
- History of Georgetown University

For lists of alumni organized by the university's constituent schools see:

- List of Georgetown University Law Center alumni
