= Michael O'Callaghan =

Michael O'Callaghan (or similar) may refer to:

- Michael O'Callaghan (Paralympian), New Zealand Paralympian who competed in athletics
- Mike O'Callaghan, governor of Nevada
- Michael O'Callaghan (politician), see History of Limerick
- Michael O'Callaghan (hurler)

== See also ==
- Michael Callaghan (disambiguation)
- Mick O'Callaghan (disambiguation)
