= Baczko =

Surname list

Baczko is a surname. Notable people with the surname include:

- Bernadett Baczkó (born 1986), Hungarian judoka
- Bronisław Baczko (1924–2016), Polish philosopher
- Joseph R. Baczko, dean of the Lubin School of Business of Pace University
