= Michael Callahan =

Michael Callahan may refer to:

- Michael Callahan (basketball) (fl. 1984–2000), Australian wheelchair basketball player and businessman
- Michael Callahan (ice hockey) (born 1999), American ice hockey player
- Michael Callahan (rowing) (fl. 1992–2013), collegiate rowing coach
- Michael Callahan (soccer) (born 1987), American soccer player
- Michael J. Callahan (lawyer) (fl. 1995–2014), American lawyer and corporate executive
- Michael J. Callahan (New York politician) (1858–1902), American saloonkeeper and politician
- Sean Michael Callahan (born 1975), retired American soccer player
- Michael Shane Callahan, American actor
- Mike Callahan, fictional character in the Callahan's Crosstime Saloon short stories by Spider Robinson

== See also ==
- Michael Callaghan (disambiguation)
