= Mick O'Callaghan =

Mick O'Callaghan may refer to:

- Mick O'Callaghan (rugby union, born 1946), New Zealand rugby union player
- Mick O'Callaghan (rugby union, born 1936), Irish rugby union player
