= President and Directors of Georgetown College =

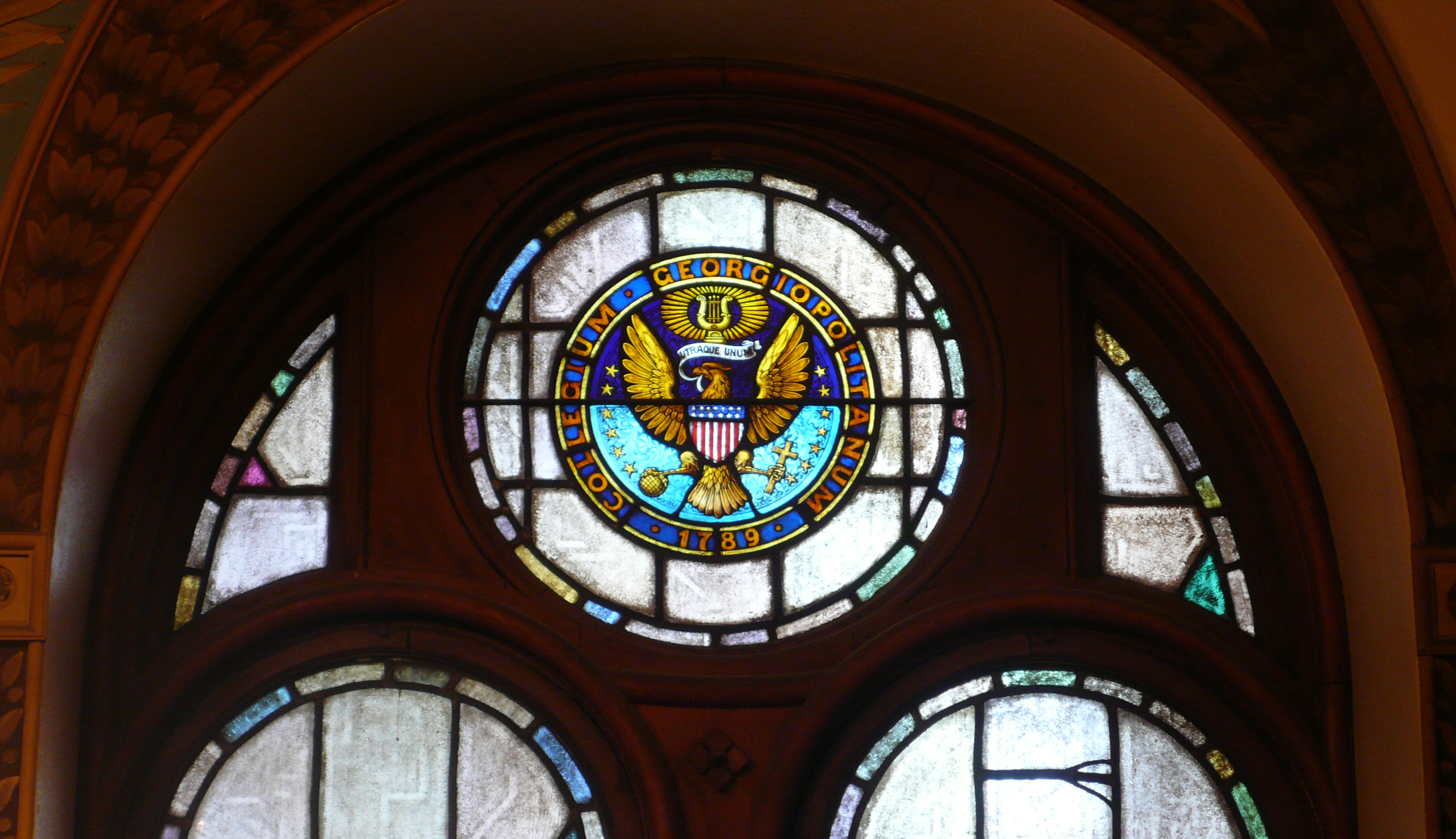
The seal of Georgetown College from 1844 to 1977

The President and Directors of Georgetown College is the governing body of Georgetown University in Washington, D.C. In contrast to the board of regents and the board of governors, which serve advancement and alumni affairs functions, respectively, and advisory roles to the President, the President and Directors of Georgetown College is the legal entity of the incorporated Georgetown University.

The authority of the body is enumerated in the March 1, 1815 federal charter of Georgetown University passed by the Thirteenth United States Congress and signed by President James Madison. The corporate charter of the university was amended by "An Act to Incorporate Georgetown College in the District of Columbia" in 1844. The legal name of the university was clarified by Public Law 89-631 passed by the 89th Congress and signed by President Lyndon Johnson on October 4, 1966, which authorized the institution to operate under the style of "Georgetown University" and permitted the university to exercise the powers granted to nonprofit corporations under the "District of Columbia Nonprofit Corporation Act" of 1962.

As of 2023, the board of directors comprises 39 members, including a chair and vice chair, and the president of Georgetown University who serves ex officio as a member of the board of directors. The current chairman is Thomas A. Reynolds III, partner at Winston and Strawn LLP and the vice chairs are Suzanne O. Donohoe and Fr. Agbonkhianmeghe Orobator, S.J. Notable members include Edward L. Cohen, principal of Lerner Enterprises and principal owner of the Washington Nationals Baseball Club, Joseph F. Dunford Jr., 19th chairman of the Joint Chiefs of Staff, Fr. James Martin, SJ, editor-at-large of America magazine, Frank McCourt, chairman and CEO of McCourt Global and former owner of the Los Angeles Dodgers, former Georgetown Hoyas basketball star and member of the Naismith Memorial Basketball Hall of Fame Dikembe Mutombo, and Kenneth A. Samet, President and chief executive officer of MedStar Health Inc.

== See also ==
- History of Georgetown University
- List of Georgetown University alumni
- List of presidents of Georgetown University
