= Walter F. Murphy =

American political scientist

Walter Murphy
- Born: Walter Francis Murphy, Jr. November 21, 1929; Charleston, South Carolina, U.S.
- Died: April 20, 2010 (aged 80); Charleston, South Carolina, U.S.

Academic background
- Education: University of Notre Dame (BA); University of Chicago (PhD)

Academic work
- Discipline: Political science
- Institutions: United States Naval Academy; Princeton University
- Notable students: Samuel Alito

Walter Francis Murphy, Jr. (November 21, 1929 – April 20, 2010) was an American political scientist and writer.

== Early life and education ==
Born in Charleston, South Carolina, Murphy received a Distinguished Service Cross and was awarded a Purple Heart for his service in the United States Marine Corps during the Korean War, eventually retiring with the rank of colonel. He earned a bachelor's degree from the University of Notre Dame in 1950 and a PhD from the University of Chicago in 1957.

== Career ==
Murphy taught government at the United States Naval Academy before returning to graduate school. After earning his PhD, he spent a year as a fellow at the Brookings Institution. He held the position of McCormick Professor of Jurisprudence at Princeton University, a chair whose first occupant was Woodrow Wilson. As a professor, he was undergraduate thesis advisor for Samuel Alito. His professional writing, consisting mostly of non-fiction works on political science, included Constitutional Democracy: Creating and Maintaining a Just Political Order; he has also written three popular novels, including The Vicar of Christ.

== Personal life ==
He was married for 54 years to Mary Therese Dolan Murphy, who died in 2006. He had two daughters with her. He moved to Charleston South Carolina and married Doris Maher Murphy in 2010. Murphy died of cancer at age 80. Murphy's name was on the "Selectee List".

== Sources ==
- The Charleston Post and Courier
- The New York Times
