= Michael Callaghan =

Michael Callaghan may refer to:

- Michael Callaghan (tennis) in 1962 Australian Championships – Men's Singles
- Mike Callaghan, politician
- Michael Callaghan (artist) of Earthworks Poster Collective

== See also ==
- Michael Callahan (disambiguation)
- Michael O'Callaghan (disambiguation)
