= Angelo Thrower =

Angelo Thrower is an African-American physician and businessperson. He is a physician with the Miami Heat NBA basketball team and founder of Dr. Thrower's Heritage Collection for Black Skin Care.

== Early life ==
Angelo Thrower was raised in the Carol City suburb of Miami. He first attended the College of the Canyons in California on a basketball scholarship, before a biology professors encouraged him to apply to medical school.

== Early career ==
Thrower graduated from the medical school at the University of Miami in 1989, and pursued postgraduate work at the Georgetown University Medical Center. Following his education, he began his own skin therapy and dermatology clinic in South Miami. As he was one of the few people in the region to specialize on black skin, he treated both Floridians and those flying into Miami from local Caribbean islands. He lectured on black skin care on the local radio and wrote columns on the subject in The Miami Times over the span of his early professional career in Florida. He later recalled his colleagues tried to convince him before opening his own clinic to specialize in racialized skin types that he was making a mistake, because skin problems did not exist in non-white skin.

== Career ==
In 1992, Thrower became a physician with the Miami Heat NBA basketball team as well as running his personal clinic. He remained with the Heat for twenty-five years. In addition to his clinic, Thrower also developed skin care kits for his clients and patients, adding a facial rejuvenation service to his medical practice. This grew to become the Dr. Thrower's Heritage Collection for Black Skin Care line of skin care products, that were introduced into 315 Walmart locations in 1999 after being sold locally and in Publix stores. By 2003 the product line was available in 1750 stores, including Walmarts and K-mart outlets, and remains sold in Walmart.
