= Eamonn O'Reilly =

Irish chef and restaurateur

Eamonn O'Reilly (born 1971) is an Irish chef and restaurateur. He is the owner of the Dublin restaurants, The Greenhouse and One Pico, and has won numerous accolades including a coveted Michelin Star. O'Reilly himself has won "Chef of the Year Award" for 2006 from the Restaurants Association of Ireland, and "Chef of the Year Award" for 2010 from Georgina Campbell Guide.

== Background ==
Eamonn O'Reilly was born in Dublin into a family of chefs. From a young age he was passionate about cooking.

Educated at Marian College, in 1984 aged just 13 he began his chef apprenticeship under his father at Dublin's foremost five star Hotel. After staying with his father for five years he landed a position of Pastry Chef at the new Hotel Conrad Dublin. He later moved to The Westbury Hotel Dublin (Leading Hotels of The World) to the position of Restaurant Chef of The Russell Room aged just 21, this was his first senior role in charge of the hotels fine dining restaurant. He completed culinary college while at The Westbury and was the youngest ever chef at 21 to complete the Master chefs exam (London City & Guilds 706–3).

During his time at The Westbury he completed numerous stages at the Ritz-Carlton Dearborn, the Sheraton Hotel Casablanca and Michelin star Restaurant Le Meurice at The Hotel Meurice, Paris. At the age of 24 he decided to leave The Westbury after he was offered a position as opening Executive Chef for a new boutique Dublin hotel. In 1997 aged 26 he won the Egon Ronay Newcomer of the Year Award and opened his restaurant One Pico located in Camden Street, 2001 saw One Pico move to a larger premises off St. Stephens Green.

In 2002 he purchased the restaurant Belgo on Sycamore St from the London-based restaurant group Signature Restaurants. After redesigning it he opened a new 200-seat restaurant called Pacific which won the Hotel & Catering Magazine "Best Restaurant" 2002. He sold it one year later and said because of its size and location it was more suited to London than Dublin. He immediately opened another restaurant on Dawson Street called Bleu Bistro Moderne which soon after opening won the Restaurants Association of Ireland "Best New Restaurant" 2003.

In 2011 he opened another restaurant called The Box Tree in the small village of Stepaside at the Dublin Mountains. The Box Tree was immediately awarded a "Bib Gourmand" from The Michelin Guide, Great Britain and Ireland for 2012 and for 2013. Despite the huge success he decided to sell The Box Tree to concentrate his efforts on his new restaurant The Greenhouse.

One Pico was awarded "Best Dublin Restaurant" 2010 by Food & Wine Magazine, "Gold Medal Award" 2010 by Hotel & Catering Magazine, "Best Fine Dining Restaurant" 2010 by Irish Hospitality Institute and was also awarded "Three Rosettes" 2016/2017 by AA Guide UK & Ireland Outstanding restaurants that achieve standards that demand recognition well beyond One Pico was also awarded the new "Michelin Plate" 2017 by Michelin Guide Great Britain & Ireland.

O'Reilly opened his boutique restaurant The Greenhouse in 2012, he installed Finnish chef Mickael Viljanen as the Head Chef, it opened to much acclaim and was lauded as the most exciting restaurant to open in Dublin in years. It was immediately awarded restaurant of the year by all the various publications with Mickael Viljanen awarded "Chef of the Year", it was subsequently awarded one "Michelin Star" in 2016 by The Michelin Guide Great Britain & Ireland. In 2019 it received its second "Michelin Star".
