= Olivia Mellan =

Olivia Mellan (October 14, 1946 – August 17, 2024), an American psychotherapist and consultant, specialized in money conflict resolution. A leader in the field of money psychology since 1982, she was frequently interviewed on such TV programs as The TODAY Show, Oprah, and ABC's 20-20, as well as by Money magazine, The New York Times, The Wall Street Journal, and many other nationwide broadcast and print media. She also published five pioneering books about money and relationships with co-author Sherry Christie, and wrote "The Psychology of Money" column and many feature articles for Investment Advisor magazine. In 2006, Investment Advisor named her one of the Top 25 influencers on the financial advisor industry.

== Early life and education ==
Mellan was born on October 14, 1946, in Brooklyn, New York, to Eli Mellan, an attorney (and later District Court Judge in Nassau County, New York), and Sara Mellan, a secretary and housewife. Raised in Wantagh, Long Island, she was named salutatorian of her graduating class at nearby MacArthur High School. Mellan won a full scholarship to attend Mount Holyoke College. After spending her junior year in Paris, she graduated from Mount Holyoke in 1968 with a B.A. magna cum laude in French. Mellan was granted another full scholarship to Georgetown University's School of Language and Linguistics, where in 1972 she earned a master's degree in French, minoring in sociolinguistics. Mellan took advantage of opportunities to choreograph plays in both Paris and the U.S. As her interest in psychotherapy grew, she trained for three years in the Washington Women's Center Feminist Counseling program, followed by an additional three years in the Washington (D.C.) Therapy Guild's training program. She graduated from the Therapy Guild program in 1974.

== Early career ==
Mellan has been in private practice since 1974 as a psychotherapist specializing in women's issues and in couples conflict resolution. Since 1982, she began specializing in money psychology and money conflict resolution, when she and attorney and friend Michael Goldberg, realized that "money was the last taboo in the therapy office and in life in general." They coined the term "money harmony" and offered a workshop at Sevenoaks Retreat Center in Madison, Va., leading a money psychology group at a Money Conference where Michael Phillips was the keynoter. Impressed by their work, Phillips sponsored a trip to California for Goldberg and Mellan to train other therapists in money psychology work.

An article in the Washington Post's Style section about "Money Madness" appearing around the Christmas season mentioned Mellan (under her previous married name - Mundra) and Goldberg's money personality types. This led to many radio and print interviews, and several years later, Mellan self-published a workbook, Ten Days to Money Harmony. This book came to the attention of George Gibson, head of Walker Publishing in New York City, who invited Mellan to expand her workbook into her first published book.

== Money psychology work ==
Since 1983, Mellan's private practice expanded to include money-related issues for both individuals and couples. By the 1990s, over half of her practice was money-related. She taught Money Harmony courses at the Washington Ethical Society (for both individuals and couples), and after a financial planner (John Cammack) took one of her workshops, he invited her to speak to local and national financial advisor groups about money and relationships. Mellan developed a specialty in gender differences around money, and couples polarization patterns and money, and began presenting workshops to therapist groups as well (at the Family Therapy Networker Symposium, now the Psychotherapy Networker Symposium, where she spoke almost yearly,) among others.

== Writing and bibliography ==
Select Investment Advisor Columns

- Resolving Conflict: Eight Steps to Workplace Harmony
- A Willful Purpose
- Cover Story, Reassessing Risk

Books

- Money Harmony: Resolving Money Conflicts In Your Life and Relationships. Walker & Company (1994).
- Money Shy to Money Sure: A Woman's Road Map to Financial Well-being. Walker & Company (2001).
- Your Money Style: The Nine Attitudes to Money and How They Affect Happiness, Love, Work and Family. Fine Communications (2001).
- Overspending: A Winning Plan for Spenders and their Partners (with Sherry Christie). Money Harmony Books 2009).
- The Client Connection: Helping Advisors Build Bridges that Last (with Sherry Christie). The National Underwriter Company (2009).

== Chapters in other books ==
Mellan had a chapter on "Overcoming Overspending" in April Benson's book: To Buy or Not to Buy: Compulsive Shopping and the Search for Self. (year): In 2008, Mellan's chapter on "Money Harmony" appeared in Peak Vitality: Raising the Threshold of Abundance in Our Material, Spiritual, and Emotional Lives, edited by Jeanne House. In 2009, Mellan's chapter on "Money Harmony" appeared in Breaking Through: Getting Past the Stuck Points in Your Life, edited by Barbara Stanny, an anthology of inspiring essays from over 60 expert coaches, financial advisors, therapists, and other professionals.

Also in 2009, the Love Book: The Top 50 Most Trusted Experts Reveal Their Secrets for Relationship Success by Scott Braxton, features a chapter by Mellan on "Moving toward Money Harmony" (and also features Dr. Phil, Harriet Lerner, Pat Love, John Gray, Tony Robins, Dr. Ruth, and Dr. Laura.)

== Television and radio ==
Mellan has appeared frequently on The TODAY Show, on Oprah, and on ABC's 20-20. She hosted her own radio show in Philadelphia, "Money Harmony with Olivia Mellan", on WWDB-AM, the Valley's only "money talk radio station", in 2007. Her video, In the Prime: Couples and Money with Olivia Mellan, stems from her appearance on the PBS series, "In the Prime." She has been interviewed on Marketplace; on NPR; and across the country on radio and local TV. She has appeared several times on Kelvin Boston's PBS Series "Moneywise."
