= Greg Olear =

American novelist, journalist, and author (born 1972)

- Born: November 13, 1972 (age 54); Madison, New Jersey, U.S.
- Education: Georgetown University (BA)
- Occupations: Novelist; journalist; nonfiction author

Greg Olear (born November 13, 1972) is an American novelist, journalist, and author whose work often touches on political subjects. His novels are noted for their dark humor and frequent references to pop culture. He is the LA Times best-selling author of the novels Totally Killer (2009), Fathermucker (2011), and Empress: The Secret History of Anna K (2022), as well as 2018’s non-fiction book Dirty Rubles: An Introduction to Trump/Russia, which Salon called “essential reading for all Americans.” The first two of his novels have been translated into other languages and have also been optioned for screen.

== Early life and education ==
Olear was born and raised in Madison, New Jersey, He is half Italian, his great grandmother having emigrated from a town located on the side of a volcano near Naples in Campania, southern Italy. He attended Georgetown University, where he received his BA in English Literature.

== Career ==
Olear was the senior editor of the online literary magazine The Nervous Breakdown.

The French-language edition of Totally Killer was published in 2011 by Editions Gallmeister, and has received favorable notices in L'Express.

== Books ==
=== Novels ===
- Totally Killer (2009)
- Fathermucker (2011)
- Empress: The Secret History of Anna K (2022)

=== Nonfiction ===
- Dirty Rubles: An Introduction to Trump/Russia (2018)

== Journalism ==
Along with his published novels, Olear has a web presence. He’s written pieces for the Huffington Post, Babble.com, The Rumpus, The Millions, and Psychology Today online, among others. As an early adopter of Substack; On November 1, 2019, he created a fierce online presence of his own with his site PREVAIL, as a means to chronicle the context of the mainstream news cycle. He is a frequent guest on The Stuttering John Podcast and Start Me Up! with Kimberley Johnson.

In February 2021, he expanded PREVAIL to include hosting a weekly podcast, each week featuring a different compelling guest related to current events, frequently combined with the article published the same day. He also began co-hosting a weekly online live news review chat—The Five 8, with Stephanie Koff in April 2022, described as "where we take FIVE of the week's most notable, newsworthy, and eff'd up topics and spend 8 minutes covering each one."

== Personal life ==
A former longtime resident of New York City, Olear lives in New Paltz, New York, with his wife, two children (and three cats).
