= The Vicar of Christ =

1979 novel by Walter F. Murphy

First edition

The Vicar of Christ is a bestselling 1979 novel by Walter F. Murphy. The novel tells the life story of the fictional Declan Walsh, who at various stages of his life is a Medal of Honor recipient for actions during the Korean War, Chief Justice of the United States, and finally Pope Francis I (Latin: Franciscus Primus).

It uses as a narrative framing device the format of being a transcription of tape recordings of interviews made in preparation for writing a biography of the now-dead 'Papa Francesco'.

The four interviewees are, in order: Master Gunnery Sergeant Giuseppe Michelangelo Guicciardini, Jr., USMC retired, who recounts Walsh’s wartime experiences; Associate Justice of the Supreme Court C. Bradley Walker, III, who recounts the circumstances leading to Walsh’s appointment, career, and eventual resignation as Chief Justice; Ugo Cardinal Galeotti, who recounts the election of Declan Walsh (at the time a simple monk who had resigned as Chief Justice after the death of his wife) by a bitterly deadlocked conclave and his subsequent career as Papa Francesco; and Walsh’s Papal Press Secretary Robert Twisdale, who recounts the assassination and funeral of Papa Francesco. Each of the four interviews is prefaced with a short quotation from a poem by Zbigniew Herbert.
