= Susan O'Malley =

American sports executive (born 1961)

- Born: November 7, 1961 (age 64)
- Citizenship: United States
- Education: Surrattsville High School; Mount St. Mary's University; Georgetown University Law School
- Occupation: Sports executive
- Known for: First female president of a National Basketball Association team
- Title: President of the Washington Wizards
- Term: 1991-2007
- Predecessor: Abe Pollin
- Website: twitter.com/1lasooz

Susan O'Malley (born November 7, 1961) is an American sports executive. In 1991, she became president of the Washington Bullets team, a member of the National Basketball Association (NBA); then 29 years old, she was the first female president of an NBA franchise, and one of the first women to hold the top front-office position for a major league sports team in North America.

== Early life and education ==
Susan O'Malley grew up in a Catholic family in Clinton, Maryland (in Prince George's County), one of five children of Janice Karol and Peter O'Malley. Her father was an influential Maryland attorney who also served as president of the National Hockey League team, the Washington Capitals, when Susan was a child. The middle child of the five siblings, she expressed an early interest in sports, writing an elementary school essay on her desire to run a professional sports team, which a teacher told her was "unrealistic".

In 1979, O'Malley graduated from Surrattsville High School. Like her father, she attended college at Mount St. Mary's University, graduating in 1983. She earned a J.D. degree at Georgetown University Law School in 2007.

== Career ==
=== Early career ===
As an undergraduate, O'Malley interned for the Washington Capitals as well as the National Basketball Association team, the Washington Bullets (both owned by Abe Pollin). After graduating from college, she began her career working for the Earle Palmer Brown advertising firm, following the advice of another member of Pollin's organization who told her to seek experience outside the sports franchises because women had a better chance of attaining a senior role through a lateral hire than rising through the ranks from an entry-level position.

=== Washington Sports & Entertainment ===
In 1986, O'Malley joined Abe Pollin's Washington Sports & Entertainment group as director of advertising for the Washington Bullets (later renamed the Washington Wizards). She initially encountered some resistance and isolation in the organization, suspected of nepotism as her father had worked closely with owner Pollin. Some coworkers refused to eat with her and at one point her car was filled with trash. But O'Malley soon developed a close working relationship with then-Bullets vice-president and NBA Hall-of-Famer Wes Unseld, who was named coach of the team the following year, which helped to solidify O'Malley's place in the organization. She was promoted to director of marketing, then to executive vice-president in 1988. O'Malley's work on marketing and promotions boosted the team's ticket sales even as the team struggled on the court; between 1988 and 1992 O'Malley produced a 25% increase in attendance, with 1991–1992 season recording the team's highest average attendance in 13 years and the most sold-out games in team history.

In May 1991, Pollin appointed O'Malley president of the Bullets (O'Malley initially protested that she could not be team president because he was already president; he said he could find something else to be). Then 29 years old, O'Malley became the first woman to hold the position for any team in NBA history, and the third woman to be president of a major professional sports team in the US (the other two were Georgia Frontiere of the Los Angeles Rams and Gay Culverhouse of the Tampa Bay Buccaneers). As president, O'Malley oversaw the opening of the MCI Center (later renamed the Verizon Center, then the Capital One Arena) in 1997 in the Chinatown neighborhood of Washington, D.C., a project that spurred the economic redevelopment of the downtown area as well as set a new record for naming rights deals: MCI paid $50 million for a 10-year commitment. O'Malley also served on the panel that selected from fan proposals for a new name after Pollin announced that, to remove associations with gun violence, the team would no longer be known as the Bullets.

In 1994, Pollin named O'Malley and Unseld head of corporate advertising and sponsorship for USAir Arena, home stadium for both his teams. Shortly thereafter he promoted the pair again to head of business operations for the Washington Capitals.

O'Malley served as president of the Wizards through 2007. On her announcement that she was stepping down, Pollin described her as his "right hand through the past 20 years".

=== Later career ===
O'Malley is senior instructor in the Department of Sport and Entertainment Management at the University of South Carolina.

== Personal life ==
While she was with the Bullets, O'Malley's nickname La Sooz was popularized by Washington Post sports columnist Tony Kornheiser, accompanying his affectionately tongue-in-cheek French stylization of the team name as Les Boulez.

O'Malley resides on Sullivan's Island, South Carolina. She previously lived in Columbia, Maryland; Kent Island, Maryland; and Old Town in Alexandria, Virginia.
