= Relational Investors =

Relational Investors LLC
- Company type: Private
- Industry: Financial services
- Founded: 1996
- Founder: Ralph V. Whitworth, Co-Founder; David H. Batchelder, Co-Founder
- Headquarters: San Diego California
- Products: Asset Managements, Activist Investor
- Total assets: $6 billion
- Website: www.rillc.com

Relational Investors was an activist investment fund based in San Diego, California. Founded in 1996 by Ralph V. Whitworth, the fund had $6 Billion in assets under management.
