= Mick O'Callaghan (rugby union, born 1936) =

Irish rugby union player

- Full name: Michael Paul O'Callaghan
- Born: 1936 Montenotte, Cork, Ireland
- Died: 15 April 2018 Lahinch, Clare, Ireland

Rugby union career
- Position: Prop
International career
Years	Team	Apps	(Points)
1962–64	Ireland	3	(0)

Michael Paul O'Callaghan (1936 — 15 April 2018) was an Irish international rugby union player.

Cork-native O'Callaghan was a prop who lacked the height traditionally required for the position, but was quick around the pitch. He played his club rugby for Sundays Well, London Irish and Young Munster.

O'Callaghan was capped three times for Ireland, debuting in a draw against Wales at Lansdowne Road during the 1962 Five Nations. His other two caps came in away 1964 Five Nations matches against England and France.

A Munster representative, O'Callaghan was one of their best performers in a narrow loss to the touring All Blacks in 1963, playing the majority of the match with his head stitched and covered in bandages. He was also in the Munster side that beat the touring Australian team in 1967.

O'Callaghan was an electrical contractor by profession.

== See also ==
- List of Ireland national rugby union players
