= Ralph V. Whitworth =

American businessman

Ralph Victor Whitworth (October 12, 1955 – September 29, 2016) was an American businessman who was a founder of Relational Investors LLC, a private investment management firm based in San Diego, California, which primarily seeks out value stocks at companies deemed to be underperforming due to poor capital allocation discipline and corporate governance. Whitworth co-founded Relational with David Batchelder in 1996; the firm manages approximately $6 billion, and Whitworth was a principal and member of the Investment Committee.

== Early life and education ==
Whitworth was born on October 12, 1955 and grew up in rural Nevada, the son of a geologist and mining engineer. At the age of 19, he was appointed superintendent of parks and recreation in his hometown of Winnemucca, Nevada, in which position he worked to expand and modernize the community's parks system, municipal golf course, swimming pool, and other recreational facilities. He left this position at the age of 23 to attend the University of Nevada, Reno, and his juris doctor degree from Georgetown University Law Center in 1985.

== Career ==
Whitworth began his career serving on the U.S. Senate Judiciary Committee staff of Senator Paul Laxalt from 1981 to 1984. In 1984, Whitworth took a leave of absence from the Laxalt office to serve as deputy to the chairman - Voters for Reagan-Bush in president Ronald Reagan's re-election campaign. From 1985 to 1988, he was the assistant to the General Partner at Mesa Limited Partnership under well-known oilman T. Boone Pickens. He was president of development at United Thermal Corporation from 1989 to 1992, served on the company's board of directors through December 1993, and chaired the board's special committee to represent minority shareholders during its sale to Trigen Energy Corporation.

From 1986 to 1994 Whitworth was president (pro bono) of the United Shareholders Association, a U.S.-based advocacy group founded by Pickens. The group focused on enhancing shareholder rights, improving corporate governance/financial transparency, and increasing corporate executive accountability. During this time, he authored a petition for rulemaking to the United States Securities and Exchange Commission ("SEC"), which paved the way for a major reform in 1992 of the SEC's shareholder communications and executive compensation disclosure rules, including a rule allowing "short slate" director nominations.

In 1998 Whitworth became chairman of Apria Healthcare Group and held this position until 2005. He then became chairman of Waste Management Inc. in 1999, in the wake of an accounting and insider trading crisis, serving on its board and as the chairman of its Nominating and Governance Committee until May 2004.

After joining Hewlett-Packard Company's board of directors in November 2011, HP's board elected Whitworth chairman of the board, on an interim basis, in April 2013. He served as chairman until July 2014 when he resigned to focus on his health.

He has served on the board of ten other public companies: including Mattel, Sirius Satellite Radio, Tektronix, Inc., Sprint Nextel, Wilshire Technologies, Inc., United Thermal Corporation, Sovereign Bancorp, and Genzyme Corporation. Whitworth was also a member of the Public Company Accounting Oversight Board's Advisory Council.

His activities have involved him in corporate governance issues including those involving The Timken Company, Occidental Petroleum, Sprint Nextel, Home Depot, Sovereign Bancorp, and Waste Management.

== Politics ==
Ralph Whitworth donated over $50,000 to Republican political candidates from 2000 to 2019, including Donald Trump and Lindsey Graham.

== Philanthropy ==
He has also donated $1 million to the assist at-risk students in the Humboldt County school system in Winnemucca, and established an endowment fund at the University of Nevada, Reno, that bears his name. In 2003 Whitworth donated $1 million to Adopt-A-Minefield, a United Kingdom-based charity that raises awareness about land mines and their associated problems. He served on the Board of Trustees of Georgetown University Law Center and the Board of Trustees of The Bishop's School in La Jolla, California. In 1999, Whitworth and several partners at Relational donated $100,000 to establish a scholarship fund at Oklahoma State University, in fellow partner David Batchelder's name.

== Death ==
Whitworth died due to complications from cancer on September 29, 2016. He was 60.

== Awards and accolades ==
- 2013: Named the "Lifetime Achiever" by the International Corporate Governance Network, the highest honor bestowed by the global, investor-led, organization of governance professionals.
- For the years 2008 through 2012, Whitworth has been recognized by NACD Directorship as one of the 100 most influential people in the boardroom and corporate governance community.
- 2004: Named "Director of the Year" by Corporate Directors Forum while serving as Apria Healthcare's Board Chairman.
- 2002: BusinessWeek recognized Waste Management as one of the five "Most Improved Boards," during Whitworth's tenure.
- 2002 & 2000: BusinessWeek cited Apria twice as one of the ten "Best Boards in America" during Whitworth's tenure as Chairman.
- 2000: Institutional Shareholder Services named Apria the "Best Governed Company in North America".
