= Michael J. Callahan (lawyer) =

American lawyer and corporate executive

- Born: Michael John Callahan; 1968 (age 56–57)
- Education: Georgetown University (BSFS); University of Connecticut (JD)
- Occupation(s): Lawyer, Corporate Executive

Michael John Callahan (born 1968) is an American lawyer and corporate executive.

== Education ==
Callahan graduated from Georgetown University's School of Foreign Service with a degree in international affairs and Arab studies in the late '80s. In 1995, he graduated from the University of Connecticut School of Law.

== Career ==
From 1990 to 1992, he was a Freshman Lightweight Crew Coach at Georgetown University and was a corporate legal assistant for Skadden, Arps, Slate, Meagher & Flom LLP and Affiliates. From 1995 to 1999, he was an associate with the same law firm. In 1999, he served as Manager for Business Development and later Corporate Counsel for Electronics for Imaging. From 1999 to 2012, he served as Executive Vice President, General Counsel, and Secretary at Yahoo!. From 2012 to 2014, he served as Executive Vice President, Chief Legal Officer and Secretary at Auction.com LLC. From 2014 to 2018, he was the general counsel of LinkedIn. Since 2017, he has served on the board of FiscalNote. Since 2018, he has been an advisor for Ledger and is a Professor of the Practice of Law and Executive Director of the Rock Center for Corporate Governance at Stanford Law School.
