= Joseph R. Baczko =

American academic

Joseph R. Baczko (pronounced "BASS-co") was the dean of the Lubin School of Business of Pace University until July 2010. Baczko is former president and COO of Blockbuster Entertainment and founder and president of Toys "R" Us International. He is German-born of Hungarian descent and raised in France; during the 1950s Baczko immigrated to the United States with his family, eventually earning a BSFS from the Edmund A. Walsh School of Foreign Service at Georgetown University and an MBA from Harvard University. Baczko also served in Vietnam as an officer in the US Marine Corps.
