= Joseph Macmanus =

American diplomat (born 1953)

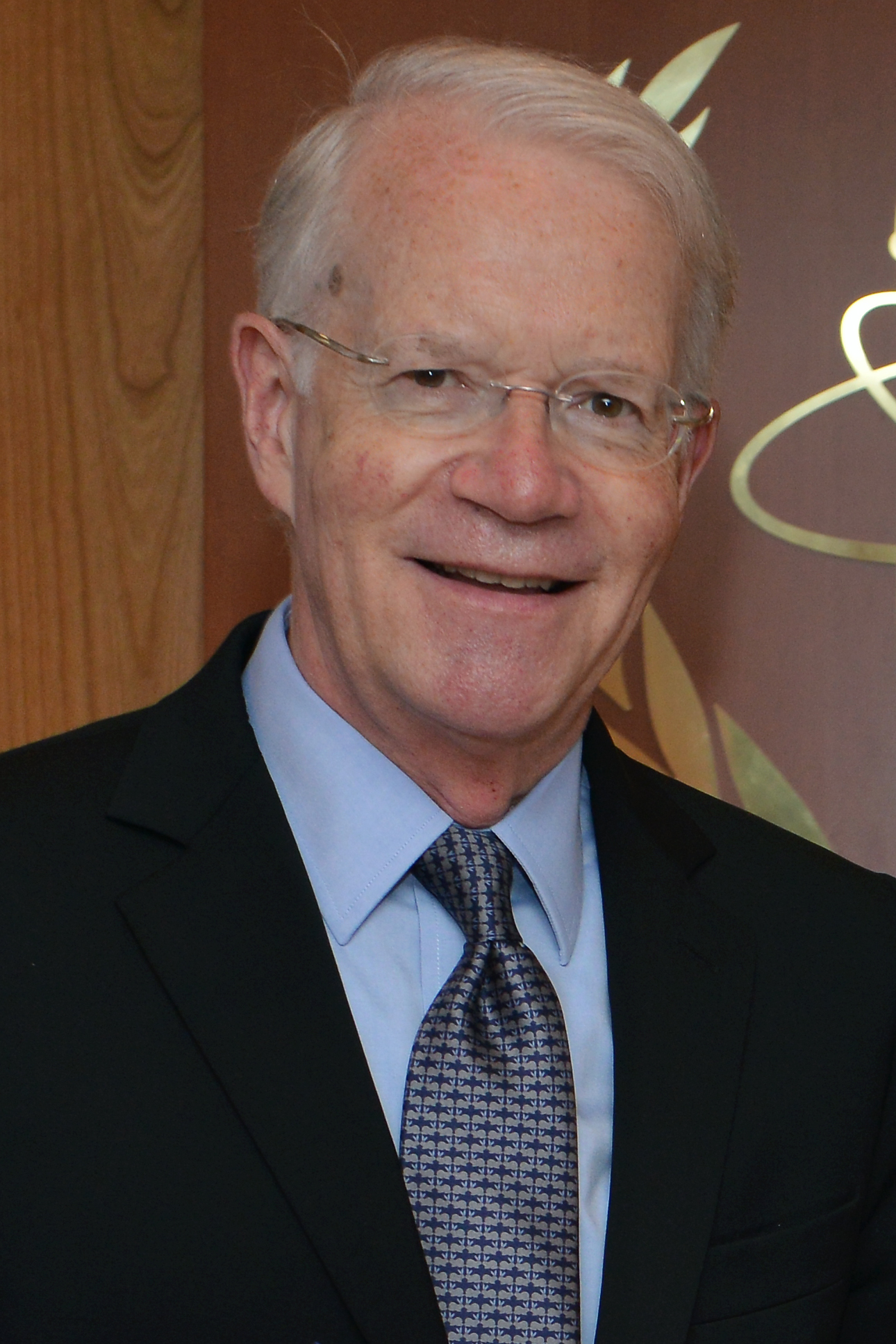
- Macmanus in 2014

25th Executive Secretary of the United States Department of State
- In office August 4, 2014 – June 15, 2017
- President: Barack Obama; Donald Trump
- Preceded by: John Bass
- Succeeded by: Lisa D. Kenna

Coordinator for Iran Nuclear Implementation
- Acting
- In office July 21, 2015 – September 25, 2015
- President: Barack Obama
- Preceded by: Position established
- Succeeded by: Stephen Mull

8th United States Ambassador to the United Nations International Organizations in Vienna
- In office September 27, 2012 – August 4, 2014
- President: Barack Obama
- Preceded by: Glyn Davies
- Succeeded by: Laura Kennedy (Acting)

Assistant Secretary of State for Legislative Affairs
- Acting
- In office January 20, 2017 – December 20, 2017
- President: Donald Trump
- Preceded by: Julia Frifield
- Succeeded by: Mary Kirtley Waters
- In office March 14, 2011 – August 4, 2011
- President: Barack Obama
- Preceded by: Richard Verma
- Succeeded by: David Adams

Personal details
- Born: 1953 (age 72–73)
- Education: University of Notre Dame; University at Buffalo

Joseph Estey Macmanus (born 1953) is an American diplomat who served as Executive Secretary of the United States Department of State from 2014 to 2017. Prior to that, he served as the U.S. ambassador to International Organizations in Vienna from 2012 to 2014, as well as interim coordinator for efforts to implement President Barack Obama's Iran Nuclear Deal in 2015.

Macmanus was President Donald Trump's nominee to become United States Ambassador to Colombia. This nomination was reported favorably by the Senate Committee on Foreign Relations in May 2018, but was returned to the President at the close of the 115th Congress without consideration by the full Senate. In 2019, Philip Goldberg replaced Macmanus as nominee to be the next United States Ambassador to Colombia.

== Career ==
Macmanus is a career foreign service officer, having entered the Foreign Service Institute in 1986. In his time at the State Department, he served as top aides to former Secretaries of State Condoleezza Rice and Hillary Clinton. He served as Deputy Assistant Secretary of State for Legislative Affairs from 2005 to 2008, and again from 2011 to 2012.

President Barack Obama appointed Macmanus to serve as U.S. Representative to the Vienna Office of the United Nations, as well as its representative to the International Atomic Energy Agency (IAEA) in December 2011. He came to international attention in 2013 when he accused Iran of deception at a meeting of the IAEA, and then, with the Canadian, Australian and New Zealand envoys, stormed out of the meeting after Iran criticised Israel.

On November 29, 2017, President Donald Trump nominated Macmanus to serve as the United States Ambassador to Colombia. In May 2019, it was announced that Philip Goldberg would replace Macmanus as nominee to be the next United States Ambassador to Colombia.

Political offices
Preceded by Richard Verma	Assistant Secretary of State for Legislative Affairs; Acting; 2011	Succeeded by David Adams
Preceded by John Bass	Executive Secretary of the United States Department of State; 2014–2017	Succeeded by Lisa Kenna
Preceded by Julia Frifield	Assistant Secretary of State for Legislative Affairs; Acting; 2017	Succeeded by Mary Kirtley Waters
Diplomatic posts
Preceded by Glyn Davies	United States Ambassador to the United Nations International Organizations in Vienna; 2012–2014	Succeeded by Laura Kennedy; Acting
New office	Coordinator for Iran Nuclear Implementation; Acting; 2015	Succeeded by Stephen Mull
