= Jerusalem Declaration on Antisemitism =

Guide on antisemitism

- Created: 2020–2021
- Presented: March 25, 2021
- Commissioned by: Van Leer Jerusalem Institute
- Purpose: Guide on antisemitism

The Jerusalem Declaration on Antisemitism (JDA) is a document meant to outline the bounds of antisemitic speech and conduct, particularly with regard to Zionism, Israel and Palestine. Its creation was motivated by a desire to confront antisemitism and by objections to the IHRA definition of antisemitism, which critics have said conflates antisemitism with criticism of the Israeli government. The drafting of the declaration was initiated in June 2020 under the auspices of the Van Leer Institute in Jerusalem by eight coordinators, most of whom were university professors. Upon its completion, the declaration was signed by about 200 scholars in various fields and released in March 2021.

The declaration includes a 16-word definition of antisemitism which reads: "Antisemitism is discrimination, prejudice, hostility or violence against Jews as Jews (or Jewish institutions as Jewish)." It also includes 15 guidelines, divided into three sections, that seek to aid in the identification of antisemitism and give examples of speech and conduct with regard to Israel and Palestine that are and are not antisemitic.

The declaration was positively received by a cohort of Democratic members of the US House of Representatives, who urged the US State Department to use it alongside the IHRA definition. In its response to the Representatives, the State Department reaffirmed its support for the IHRA definition and did not take any steps to adopt the JDA.

The declaration has been criticized on multiple grounds; a common critique is that by seeking to rebut the IHRA definition, the JDA undermines consensus and sets back the fight against antisemitism. The declaration has also been criticized for sidelining the issue of antisemitism by seeking to engulf it in the fight against all other forms of racism and discrimination. Its reputability has been questioned, given that a number of its signatories have been accused of antisemitism.

== Creation ==
=== Purpose ===
According to the document's preamble, The Jerusalem Declaration on Antisemitism was created in order to clarify the "limits of legitimate political speech and action concerning Zionism, Israel, and Palestine", and to be used by those seeking to identify and oppose antisemitism. It does so through its definition of antisemitism and by providing guidelines intended to characterize distinctions between antisemitic speech and legitimate criticism of Israel. Its creators intended for it to be used as an alternative or supplement to the IHRA definition.

=== Coordinators ===
The Jerusalem Declaration was coordinated and authored by an eight-member group that included seven academics and a journalist/filmmaker. The group consisted of two Britons, three Germans, two Israelis and an American.

Declaration Coordinators
Coordinator	Occupation	Nationality
Seth Anziska	Associate Professor of Jewish-Muslim Relations, University College London	American
Aleida Assmann	Professor, Literary Studies, Holocaust, Trauma and Memory Studies, University of Konstanz	German
Alon Confino	Professor of History and Jewish Studies, Director of the Institute for Holocaust, Genocide, and Memory Studies, University of Massachusetts Amherst	Israeli
Emily Dische-Becker	Freelance journalist, filmmaker	German
David Feldman	Professor, Director of the Institute for the Study of Antisemitism, Birkbeck, University of London	British
Amos Goldberg	Chair in Holocaust Studies, Head of the Avraham Harman Research Institute of Contemporary Jewry, Hebrew University of Jerusalem	Israeli
Brian Klug	Senior Research Fellow in Philosophy, St Benet's Hall, Oxford; Philosophy faculty, University of Oxford	British
Stefanie Schüler-Springorum	Professor, Director of the Center for Research on Antisemitism, Technische Universität Berlin	German

=== Drafting and signing ===
The declaration's coordinators began drafting the document online in June 2020, and the declaration was publicly released on March 25, 2021, nine months later. Following its completion, the declaration was signed by about 200 scholars in various fields including Jewish studies, antisemitism studies, Israel studies, Middle Eastern studies, and Holocaust history.

=== Name ===
The declaration is called the "Jerusalem Declaration" because it was created under the auspices of the Van Leer Institute in Jerusalem. The group that drafted its text also intended to do so in Jerusalem but could not as a result of the COVID-19 pandemic.

== Guidelines ==
The declaration's 15 guidelines are divided into three sections. Section A outlines general manifestations of racism and antisemitism and provides examples such as Holocaust denialism and the Rothschild conspiracy theories. Section B gives examples of speech and conduct relating to Israel and Palestine which are categorized as inherently antisemitic, including holding Jews collectively responsible for Israel's actions or requiring Jews to publicly disavow Israel or Zionism. Section C gives examples of speech and conduct with regard to Israel and Palestine which are characterized not necessarily antisemitic, such as expressing support for Palestinians, comparison of the State of Israel with settler-colonialism and apartheid, or opposition to Zionism. The declaration does not take an explicit stance for or against the Boycott, Divestment and Sanctions (BDS) movement or the one-state solution, but says these are not antisemitic "in and of themselves".

== Reception ==
=== US State Department ===
In April 2021, several Democrats in the US House of Representatives led by Rep. Jan Schakowsky wrote a letter to the Secretary of State, Antony Blinken, urging him to make use of tools against antisemitism beyond the IHRA definition, including the Jerusalem Declaration and Nexus Document. Organizations including Americans for Peace Now and J Street supported the letter, while the Anti-Defamation League (ADL) and American Jewish Committee (AJC) opposed it.

Responding to the letter, Acting Assistant Secretary of State Naz Durakoğlu said "the Biden Administration embraces and champions the IHRA nonlegally binding working definition of anti-Semitism in its entirety, including its examples, and the Administration continues to encourage other countries as well as international bodies to do the same". The State Department did not directly address the Jerusalem Declaration in its response.

=== Criticism ===
Mark Muhannad Ayyash, an associate professor at Mount Royal University in Canada, and himself a Palestinian, criticized the Jerusalem Declaration as a document "casts itself as a liberal, tolerant and anti-racist" but in reality "is an orientalist text that fails to produce true opposition to the core problem of the IHRA definition: the silencing and erasure of Palestine and Palestinians". He argues that the declaration presents Palestinians as unreasonably "hostile, reactionary, and emotional". Ayyash also challenges the declaration's 10th guideline, which categorizes "Denying the right of Jews in the State of Israel to exist and flourish, collectively and individually, as Jews, in accordance with the principle of equality" as inherently antisemitic, arguing that "there is very little substantive difference between this guideline and the IHRA definition's claim that arguing that Israel is a racist endeavour constitutes antisemitism".

Israeli academic Gerald Steinberg and American historian Asaf Romirowsky said that the Jerusalem Declaration legitimizes increasing violence against Jews and their institutions by politicizing and attempting to undermine efforts to reach a consensus on antisemitism. The authors criticized the declaration for its extensive use of "weasel words" like "on the face of it" and "in and of itself/themselves", which they said obscures the fact that arguments are often reinterpreted in different contexts and take on meaning beyond that of the words used to express them. The authors also claimed the declaration "marginalizes the core issues of antisemitism" by subordinating it to the fight against all other forms of discrimination. David Hirsh, a lecturer in sociology at Goldsmiths University of London, criticized the declaration on the grounds that it "does not help the fight against antisemitism", and has a blind spot for antisemitism that originates on the political left. The JDA, he wrote, is flawed because it "asks institutions to affirm that BDS ... singling out Israel as uniquely colonial or apartheid, and saying that Israel has no right to exist, are not, 'in and of themselves', antisemitic", when, according to Hirsh, those things "are at the heart of contemporary left antisemitism".

Cary Nelson, former president of the American Association of University Professors, criticized the Jerusalem Declaration on the basis that it seeks to accommodate manifestations of "new antisemitism" rather than challenge them. Nelson said the declaration's preamble is dismissive of the ways that antisemitism has stood apart from other forms of racism historically and how that history has shaped Jewish identity. He also said it makes generalizations about antisemitism that do not apply under many circumstances, like claiming that the hallmark of classic antisemitism is "the idea that Jews are linked to the forces of evil". He also said that many amongst the signers of the declaration are "anti-Zionists who cross a line into antisemitism", including Sergio Luzzatto, a historian at the University of Connecticut who, Nelson alleged, believed that medieval blood libel was true. Joshua Muravchik, a professor at the Institute of World Politics, criticized it for seeking to contextualize antisemitism within a broader fight against all other forms of discrimination because that framing ignores that Jews are often discriminated against by other minorities. He said that by claiming "that the struggle against anti-Semitism is inseparable from similar struggles, the JDA seems to be addressing the wrong audience; much of the anti-Semitism that plagues Jews arises from non-majority groups".

=== Response to criticism ===
In Fathom articles from April and May 2021, Michael Walzer, an original signer of the Jerusalem Declaration, responded to criticisms registered against him and the declaration, and reaffirmed his support for the IHRA definition. He conceded that like the IHRA definition, the Jerusalem Declaration could be misinterpreted. He said the organizers of the declaration should have rejected the signatures of the declaration's "antisemitic signatories". He also said he had signed the declaration because he "thought that JDA offered to create a little distance, nothing more, between antisemitism and the Israel/Palestine battles" which he said he knows "often overlap". With regard to calls to repeal the IHRA definition in Great Britain, he said that "rescinding IHRA or replacing it with a definition perceived as more permissive would send a very bad message to students and teachers at British universities".

== See also ==
- New antisemitism
- Nexus Document
- Three Ds of antisemitism
- Working Definition of Antisemitism
