= Mary Waters =

Mary Waters may refer to:

- Mary Waters, birth name of Mary Honywood (1527–1620), British co-heiress
- Mary Waters (nurse), nurse in the United States forces during the American Revolutionary War
- Mary C. Waters (born 1956), American sociologist and author
- Mary D. Waters (born 1955), Detroit City Council member, and former member of the Michigan House of Representatives
- Mary Kirtley Waters (born 1958), director of the United Nations Information Centre in Washington, D.C.
