= 1956 United States Senate election in Kentucky =

- November 6, 1956
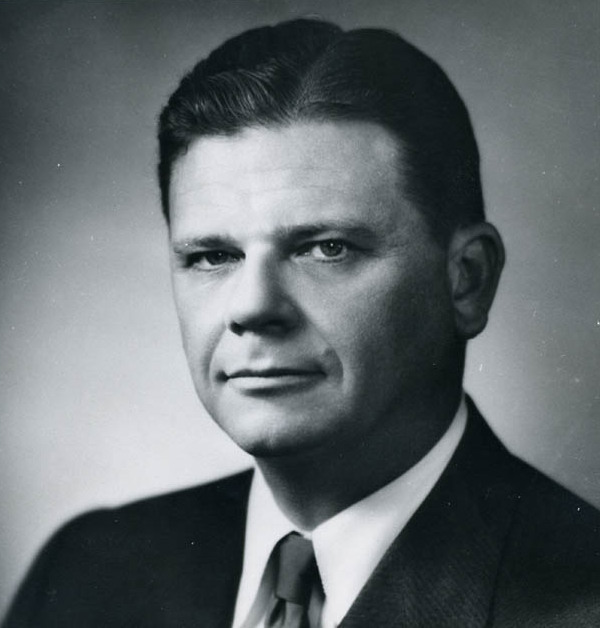

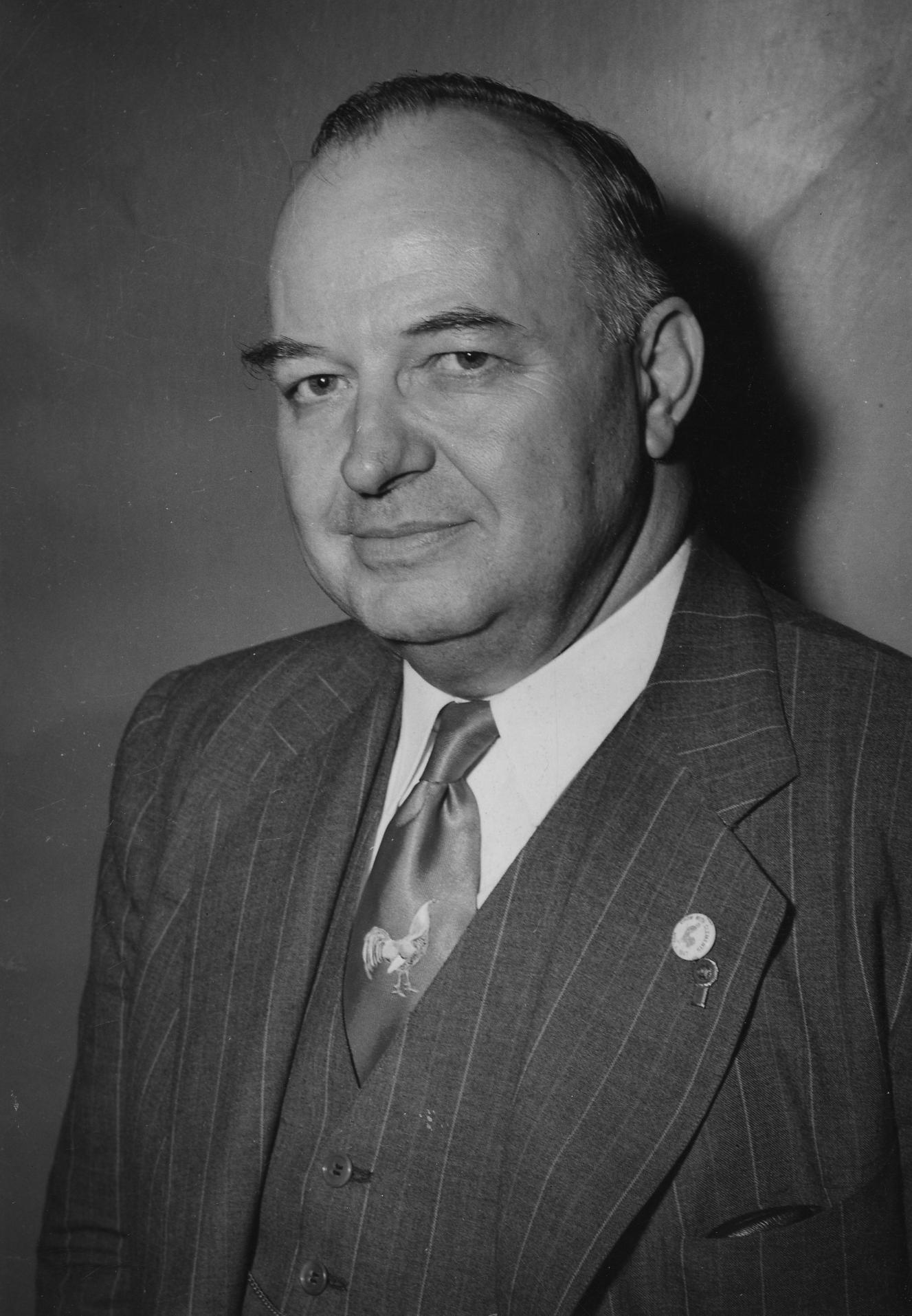
Nominee	Thruston Ballard Morton	Earle Clements
Party	Republican	Democratic
Popular vote	506,903	499,922
Percentage	50.35%	49.65%
- County results Morton: 50–60% 60–70% 70–80% 80–90% Clements: 50–60% 60–70% 70–80% 80–90%
U.S. senator before election
Earle Clements
Democratic
Elected U.S. Senator
Thruston Ballard Morton
Republican

The regular-term 1956 United States Senate election in Kentucky took place on November 6, 1956. Democratic Sen. Earle Clements was defeated for re-election by Republican U.S. Representative Thruston B. Morton.

== Primary elections ==
Primary elections were held on May 29, 1956.

=== Democratic primary ===
==== Candidates ====
- Earle Clements, incumbent U.S. Senator
- Joe B. Bates, former U.S. Representative from Raceland
- Rev. James L. Delk, unsuccessful candidate for Democratic nomination for U.S. Senate in 1946 and 1950

==== Results ====
Primary results by county Clements: 50%–60%; 60%–70%; 70%–80%; 80%–90%; Bates: 50%–60%; 60%–70%; 70%–80%; 80%–90%

Democratic primary results
Party	Candidate	Votes	%
Democratic	Earle Clements (incumbent)	218,353	60.89
Democratic	Joe B. Bates	136,533	38.08
Democratic	James L. Delk	3,703	1.03
Total votes		358,589	100.00

=== Republican primary ===
==== Candidates ====
- Julian H. Golden, former State Senator, former attorney for the National Park Service
- Thruston B. Morton, former U.S. Representative, former Assistant Secretary of State for Legislative Affairs
- Granville P. Thomas, unsuccessful candidate for Democratic nomination for Kentucky's 8th congressional district in 1954

==== Results ====
Primary results by county Morton: 40%–50%; 50%–60%; 60%–70%; 70%–80%; 80%–90%; 90%–100%; Golden: 40%–50%; 50%–60%; 60%–70%

Republican primary results
Party	Candidate	Votes	%
Republican	Thruston B. Morton	42,038	70.64
Republican	Julian H. Golden	12,976	21.81
Republican	Granville P. Thomas	4,495	7.55
Total votes		59,509	100.00

== General election ==
=== Results ===
1956 United States Senate election in Kentucky
Party	Candidate	Votes	%
Republican	Thruston B. Morton	506,903	50.35
Democratic	Earle Clements (Incumbent)	499,922	49.65
Majority		6,981	0.70
Turnout		1,006,825	
Republican gain from Democratic			

== See also ==
- 1956 United States Senate elections

== Bibliography ==
- Congressional Elections, 1946-1996. Washington, D.C.: Congressional Quarterly Inc. 1998. ISBN 1-56802-248-4.
- Jewell, Malcolm E. (1963). Kentucky Votes. Vol. 1. University of Kentucky Press.
