= Janet G. Mullins Grissom =

American lobbyist (1949–2023)

Janet Mullins
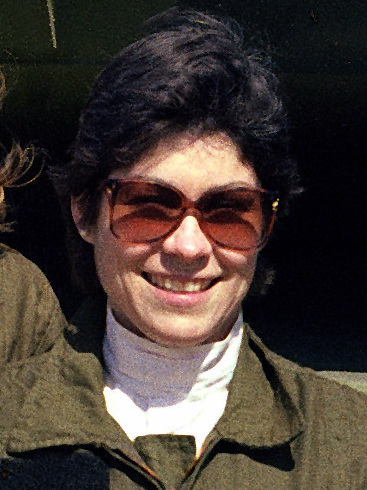
- Mullins in 1985

White House Director of Political Affairs
- In office August 24, 1992 – January 20, 1993
- President: George H. W. Bush
- Preceded by: Ron Kaufman
- Succeeded by: Rahm Emanuel

22nd Assistant Secretary of State for Legislative Affairs
- In office March 2, 1989 – August 23, 1992
- President: George H. W. Bush
- Preceded by: J. Edward Fox
- Succeeded by: Wendy Sherman

Personal details
- Born: September 7, 1949 Louisville, Kentucky, U.S.
- Died: April 29, 2023 (aged 73)
- Party: Republican
- Education: University of Louisville (BA); American University (attended)

Janet Gardner Mullins Grissom (September 7, 1949 – April 29, 2023) was an American lobbyist who worked in the United States Department of State, was U.S. Senator Mitch McConnell's first Chief of Staff, and in the White House under George H. W. Bush.

== Early life and education ==
Janet G. Mullins was born in Louisville, Kentucky, on September 7, 1949. She was educated at the University of Louisville, receiving a B.A. in political science. She later studied international economics at American University, but did not complete another degree.

== Political career ==
Mullins moved to Washington, D.C., in 1979, becoming legislative director and chief of staff for Sen. Bob Packwood (R–OR). She held this job until 1982.

Mullins returned to Kentucky in 1982 and worked in Kentucky state government as special assistant to Kentucky's Deputy Secretary of Commerce; Mullins specialized in international trade and agricultural trade.

During the 1984 Senate election, Mullins was the campaign manager for Mitch McConnell in his successful bid to unseat incumbent Senator Walter Huddleston as U.S. Senator from Kentucky. Mullins went on to serve as Senator McConnell's chief of staff from 1985 to 1987. As such, Mullins became the first woman to serve as Chief of Staff to two different United States Senators.

In 1987, Mullins became executive director of the Fund for America's Future, Vice President George H. W. Bush's political action committee. In September 1987, she joined Bush's presidential campaign. She was Bush's national field director during the 1988 Republican primaries, and during the general election was his deputy national political director and media director.

=== George H. W. Bush administration ===
After Bush became President of the United States, he nominated Mullins as Assistant Secretary of State for Legislative Affairs and Mullins subsequently held this office from March 2, 1989, until August 23, 1992. At the United States Department of State, Mullins worked with Bush's 1988 campaign manager James Baker, who became United States Secretary of State in 1989.

In April 1992, media reported that Mullins, a divorced single mother, had been romantically linked with Sen. George J. Mitchell (D–ME).

On August 24, 1992, Bush named Baker as White House Chief of Staff and Mullins moved with Baker to the White House, becoming Assistant to the President for Political Affairs. Baker and Mullins' time at the White House was to generate controversy when it was alleged that COS Baker instructed Mullins to search official records regarding Bill Clinton's rumored attempts to avoid the draft. These wrongs purportedly occurred during the 1992 presidential campaign, in violation of U.S. privacy laws. (These searches were conducted after the White House received FOIA requests from several news organizations seeking information about Clinton's military service.) On December 10, 1992, United States Attorney General William Barr asked for the appointment of an independent counsel to study the allegations that Mullins violated the law in directing this search, and then misled officials from the United States Department of Justice about conducting the search. Barr appointed Joseph diGenova as independent counsel; diGenova in turn appointed Michael Zeldin as deputy independent counsel, and Zeldin would take over as independent counsel in 1995. When diGenova issued his final report in 1995, after an exhaustive 4-year investigation, he exonerated Mullins, and wrote a public apology to Mullins, which he released in a press conference, for an investigation that had no merit from its inception. Mullins later received reimbursement for much of the legal fees she incurred in the course of the investigation, as the investigation resulted in her exoneration by the Special Counsel who stated unequivocally that the investigation "should never have occurred in the first place".

== Lobbying career ==
In 1995, Ford Motor Company chief executive officer Alex Trotman recruited Mullins as Ford's vice president for Washington Affairs, the company's Top Lobbyist. She was the second woman to become a corporate officer of Ford in the ninety-plus year history of Ford Motor Company. On May 27, 2000, Janet Mullins married Thomas L. Grissom of Louisville, Kentucky, becoming known as Janet Mullins Grissom. During the 2000 Firestone and Ford tire controversy, Grissom briefed members of the United States Senate Committee on Commerce, Science and Transportation on the controversy.

During her time with Ford, Grissom at one point chaired the executive committee of the Alliance of Automobile Manufacturers. She also served on the Board of Directors of the International Republican Institute and the American Council of Young Political Leaders and as a member of the Council on Foreign Relations, the Atlantic Council, and the Federal City Council.

Grissom retired from Ford in 2004 and in 2005 joined the lobbying firm of Peck, Madigan, Jones & Stewart. Possibly her most high-profile appearance since that time came in 2007 when she represented Mattel during the United States House Energy Subcommittee on Commerce, Trade and Consumer Protection's hearing on the 2007 Chinese export recalls.

== Death ==
Grissom died on April 29, 2023, at the age of 73.

Political offices
Preceded by J. Edward Fox	Assistant Secretary of State for Legislative Affairs; 1989–1992	Succeeded by Wendy Sherman
Preceded by Ron Kaufman	White House Director of Political Affairs; 1992–1993	Succeeded by Rahm Emanuel
