= Barbara Larkin =

American lawyer

24th Assistant Secretary of State for Legislative Affairs
- In office July 19, 1996 – January 19, 2001
- Preceded by: Wendy Sherman
- Succeeded by: Paul Vincent Kelly

Personal details
- Born: July 26, 1951 (age 75) Dubuque, Iowa, U.S.
- Education: Clarke College (BA); University of Iowa (JD)

Barbara Mills Larkin (born July 26, 1951, in Dubuque, Iowa) was United States Assistant Secretary of State for Legislative Affairs from 1996 to 2001.

== Biography ==
Larkin enrolled in Clarke College in 1969 and received a B.A. in 1973. She then attended the University of Iowa College of Law, earning a J.D. in 1977. During her time in law school, Larkin spent 1974-75 as legislative assistant to Rep. Mike Blouin (D—IA-2).

After law school, Larkin joined the Raleigh, North Carolina law firm of Sanford, Adams, McCullough, and Beard. In 1986, she became chief counsel and foreign policy adviser to Sen. Terry Sanford (D—NC). Sanford was a member of the United States Senate Committee on Foreign Relations, and Larkin also worked on the professional staff of the United States Senate Foreign Relations Subcommittee on Near Eastern and South and Central Asian Affairs. In 1993 she became legislative director and counsel to Sen. Dianne Feinstein (D—CA).

Later that year Larkin was appointed to a senior position at the United States Department of State, becoming Deputy Assistant Secretary of State for Legislative Affairs (Senate). On April 17, 1996, President of the United States Bill Clinton nominated Larkin as Assistant Secretary of State for Legislative Affairs and, after Senate confirmation, Larkin subsequently held this office from July 19, 1996, until January 19, 2001.

In February 2004, Larkin became Vice President (Policy and Advocacy) of CARE, a position she held until September 2008. In March 2010, she became a senior advisor to the Administrator of the United States Agency for International Development, where she managed the Bureau of Legislative and Public Affairs.

Government offices
Preceded by Wendy Sherman	Assistant Secretary of State for Legislative Affairs; July 19, 1996 – January 19, 2001	Succeeded by Paul V. Kelly
