= Matthew A. Reynolds =

American government official (born 1964)

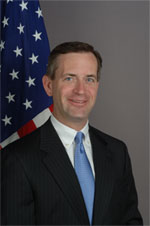
- Reynolds c. 2005

27th Assistant Secretary of State for Legislative Affairs
- In office October 6, 2008 – January 20, 2009
- President: George W. Bush
- Preceded by: Jeffrey Bergner
- Succeeded by: Richard R. Verma

Personal details
- Born: 1964 (age 61–62) Dover, Massachusetts, U.S.
- Education: Tabor Academy; Walsh School of Foreign Service (BSFS)
- Awards: Superior Honor Award

Matthew A. Reynolds (born 1964) served as assistant secretary of state for legislative affairs from October 6, 2008 to January 20, 2009, serving under the sixty-sixth secretary of state, Condoleezza Rice. Prior to this appointment he served as the bureau's principal deputy assistant secretary and intermittently as acting assistant secretary beginning in March 2005.

Mr. Reynolds served as the deputy assistant secretary for Senate affairs from September 2004 to March 2005. He joined the State Department in May 2003 as the director of House affairs. In this position, he received the Department's Superior Honor Award for Service. Prior to coming to the State Department, Mr. Reynolds spent seventeen years in numerous senior positions in both the U.S. House of Representatives and the U.S. Senate. He served as staff director of the House Rules Committee, guiding legislation on the House floor, and as professional staff on the House International Relations Committee and the Senate Foreign Relations Committee.

In addition to congressional committee assignments, Mr. Reynolds has also served as chief of staff to U.S. Representative Jay Kim (R-CA) and legislative director to U.S. Representative Robert J. Lagomarsino (R-CA). He began his congressional career with Congressman Lagomarsino in 1986.

After leaving the Department of State, Reynolds assumed leadership of the newly established Washington, DC Representative Office of the United Nations Relief and Works Agency for Palestine Refugees in the Near East.

Mr. Reynolds is a native of Dover, Massachusetts and grew up in Kanpur, India and Beirut, Lebanon. He graduated from Tabor Academy in Marion, Massachusetts and received his BSFS degree and the Dean's Citation from the School of Foreign Service, Georgetown University.

Government offices
| Preceded by Jeffrey Bergner | Assistant Secretary of State for Legislative Affairs; October 6, 2008 – January 2009 | Succeeded by Richard Verma |
