= David Manker Abshire =

American diplomat and politician (1926-2014)

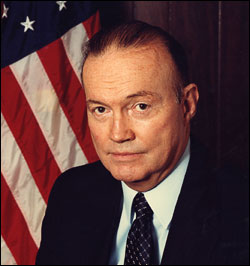

13th United States Ambassador to NATO
- In office July 13, 1983 – January 5, 1987
- President: Ronald Reagan
- Preceded by: William Tapley Bennett Jr.
- Succeeded by: Alton G. Keel Jr.

11th United States Assistant Secretary of State for Legislative Affairs
- In office April 20, 1970 – January 8, 1973
- President: Richard Nixon
- Preceded by: William B. Macomber Jr.
- Succeeded by: Marshall Wright

Personal details
- Born: David Manker Abshire; April 11, 1926 Chattanooga, Tennessee, U.S.
- Died: October 31, 2014 (aged 88) Alexandria, Virginia, U.S.
- Party: Republican
- Spouse: Carolyn Lamar Sample
- Education: U.S. Military Academy (B.S.); Georgetown University (Ph.D.)

Military service
- Allegiance: United States
- Branch/service: United States Army
- Years of service: 1951–1955
- Battles/wars: Korean War
- Awards: Bronze Star Medal

David Manker Abshire (April 11, 1926 – October 31, 2014) was an American politician and diplomat who served as a Special Counselor to President Ronald Reagan and was the United States Permanent Representative to NATO from 1983 to 1987. Abshire presided over the Center for the Study of the Presidency and Congress.

In July 2002, he was elected President of the Richard Lounsbery Foundation of New York. He was a member of the exclusive Alfalfa Club.

Abshire was a Republican and the author of seven books, the most recent being A Call to Greatness: Challenging Our Next President, which was published in 2008. Abshire was married and had five children.

He was a member of the advisory council of the Victims of Communism Memorial Foundation and sat on the advisory board of America Abroad Media.

== Background ==
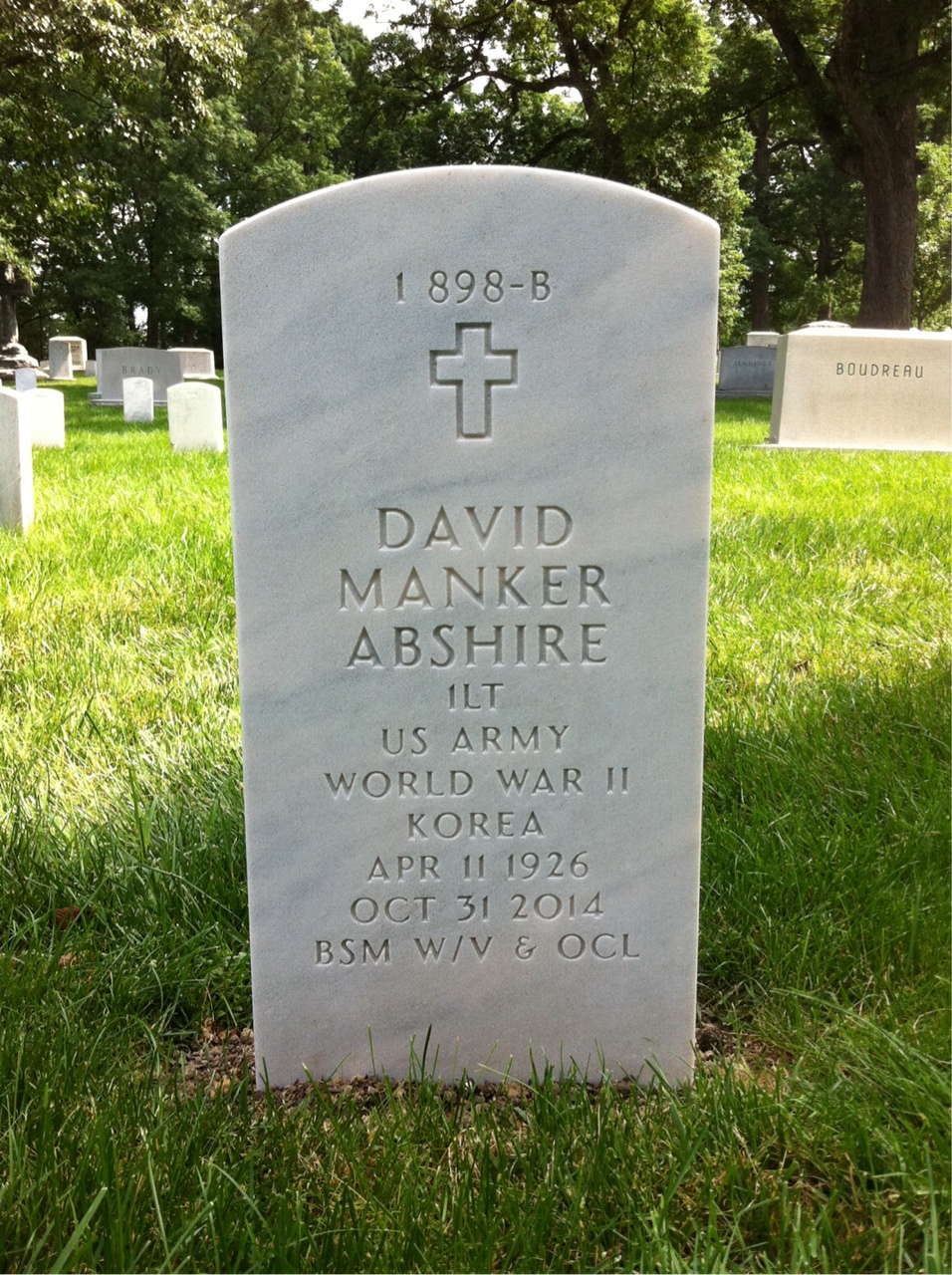
Grave at Arlington National Cemetery

=== Early life ===
Abshire was born in Chattanooga, Tennessee, on April 11, 1926.

=== Education and early career ===
He graduated from The Bright School in 1938, and Baylor School in Chattanooga in 1944.

Abshire graduated from the US Military Academy at West Point in 1951. Then he received his doctorate in History from Georgetown University in 1959, where for many years he was an adjunct professor at its Edmund A. Walsh School of Foreign Service. He is a member of the Project on National Security Reform. Till 1977 he worked as administrator in the Advisory Board at St. Albans School and in the Board of Advisors at Naval War College.

=== Military ===
Abshire fought in the Korean War 1951–1955, where he served as platoon leader, division intelligence officer and company commander. He received various distinctions: the Bronze Star with Oak Leaf Cluster with V for Valor, the Army Commendation Medal, and the Combat Infantry Badge.

== Political life ==
In 1962, Abshire and Admiral Arleigh Burke founded the Center for Strategic and International Studies (CSIS). In 1988, as President of CSIS, he merged the Hawaii-based Pacific Forum into his organization to give it more input from the Asia-Pacific region. Dr. Abshire served as Assistant Secretary of State for Congressional Relations from 1970 to 1973 and later as Chairman of the U.S. Board of International Broadcasting (1975–77). He was a member of the Murphy Commission (1974–75), the President's Foreign Intelligence Advisory Board (1981–1982), and the President's Task Force on U.S. Government International Broadcasting (1991).

During the transition of government in 1980, Abshire was asked by President-elect Reagan to head the National Security Group, which included the State and Defense Departments, the U.S. Information Agency, and the Central Intelligence Agency. He served for nine years on the board of Procter & Gamble.

== Personal ==
Abshire was married to Carolyn Lamar Sample. He had four daughters and one son: Anna Lamar Bowman, Mary Lee Jensvold, Phyllis d'Hoop, Caroline Hall and Lupton Abshire.

== Ambassador to NATO ==
In 1983–1987 Abshire was Ambassador to NATO where, in reaction to the threat posed by Soviet SS-20 missiles, he was appointed to oversee the deployment of Pershing and Cruise missiles. For his service, he was given the Distinguished Public Service Medal.

== Special Counselor to President Reagan ==
Abshire was recalled as the Iran-Contra Affair unfolded to serve as Special Counselor to President Reagan with Cabinet rank. His charge was to assure a full investigation of the sale of arms to Iran so as to restore the confidence of the nation in the Reagan presidency.

== Honors ==
- Doctor of Humane Letters from Virginia Theological Seminary in 1992.
- Doctor of Civil Law, honoris causa, from the University of the South in 1994.
- John Carroll Award for outstanding service by a Georgetown University alumnus.
- Distinguished Graduate Award of the United States Military Academy.
- 1994 U.S. Military Academy's Castle Award
- Gold Good Citizenship Medal of the Sons of the American Revolution (1988)
- Baylor Distinguished Alumni Award
- Order of the Crown (Belgium)
- Commander of the Order of Leopold (Belgium)
- Medal of the President of the Italian Republic, Senate, Parliament, and Government.
- Grand Official of the Order of Merit of the Italian Republic.
- Order of Diplomatic Service Merit Heung-In Medal (Korea)
- Insignia of the Commander, First Class, Order of the Lion of Finland
- Order of the Liberator (Argentina) in 1999.
- Order of the Sacred Treasure Gold and Silver Star (Japan) in 2001.
- Department of Defense Medal for Distinguished Public Service.
- Presidential Citizens Medal – Awarded in 1989 by President Ronald Reagan.
- Doctor of Civil Law, honoris causa, from the University Georgetown in 2006.

== Death ==
Abshire died on October 31, 2014, of pulmonary fibrosis in Alexandria, Virginia. He is survived by his wife of 56 years, the former Carolyn Sample, his son, Lupton, his daughters Anna Bowman, Mary Lee Jensvold, Phyliis d'Hoop and Carolyn Hall. He has 11 grandchildren.

== Books ==
- National Security: Political, Military, and Economic Strategies in the Decade Ahead, 1963. LCCN 63-17834.
- The South Rejects a Prophet: The Life of Senator D. M. Key, 1824–1900, Praeger, 1967. OCLC 1283029.
- International Broadcasting: A New Dimension of Western Diplomacy, 1976. ISBN 0803906579. OCLC 2401630.
- Foreign Policy Makers: President vs. Congress, 1979. ISBN 080391332X. OCLC 5707721.
- Preventing World War III: A Realistic Grand Strategy, 1988. ISBN 0060159863.
- Putting America's House in Order: The Nation as a Family (with Brock Brower), 1996. ISBN 0275954315. OCLC 33281228.
- Saving the Reagan Presidency: Trust Is the Coin of the Realm (with Richard E. Neustadt), 2005. ISBN 1585444669. OCLC 57722422.
- A Call to Greatness: Challenging Our Next President, 2008. ISBN 9780742562455. OCLC 174040251.

Government offices
Preceded by William B. Macomber, Jr.	Assistant Secretary of State for Legislative Affairs; 1970–1973	Succeeded by Marshall Wright
Diplomatic posts
Preceded by W. Tapley Bennett, Jr.	United States Permanent Representative to NATO; 1983–1987	Succeeded by Alton G. Keel, Jr.
