= Marshall Wright (diplomat) =

American diplomat (1926-2013)

12th United States Assistant Secretary of State for Legislative Affairs
- In office May 29, 1973 – February 2, 1974
- President: Richard Nixon
- Preceded by: David Manker Abshire
- Succeeded by: A. Linwood Holton Jr.

Personal details
- Born: William Marshall Wright; July 14, 1926 El Dorado, Arkansas, U.S.
- Died: December 31, 2013 (aged 87) Falls Church, Virginia, U.S.
- Spouses: Mabel Olean Johnson; Lind Groseclose

William Marshall Wright (July 14, 1926 – December 31, 2013) was United States Assistant Secretary of State for Legislative Affairs from May 29, 1973, until February 2, 1974. He had previously been senior staff member at the National Security Council. He was a resident of Arkansas.

Government offices
| Preceded by David Manker Abshire | Assistant Secretary of State for Legislative Affairs; May 29, 1973 – February 2, 1974 | Succeeded by A. Linwood Holton, Jr. |
