= Bureau of Legislative Affairs =

U.S. State Department division

- Seal of the United States Department of State

Bureau overview
- Bureau executive: Katherine Bowles, Assistant Secretary of State for Legislative Affairs
- Website: state.gov/h

The Bureau of Legislative Affairs, also known as the "H Bureau", is an office of the United States Department of State that coordinates legislative activity for the department and advises the Secretary, the Deputy, as well as the under secretaries and assistant secretaries on legislative strategy. The bureau facilitates communication between State Department officials and the Members of Congress and their staffs. The bureau works closely with authorizing, appropriations, and oversight committees of the House and Senate, as well as with individual members who have an interest in State Department or foreign policy issues. The bureau manages department testimony before House and Senate hearings, organizes member and staff briefings, and facilitates Congressional travel to overseas posts for members and staff throughout the year. The bureau reviews proposed legislation and coordinates Statements of Administration Policy on legislation affecting the conduct of U.S. foreign policy. The bureau staff advises individual bureaus of the department on legislative and outreach strategies and coordinates those strategies with the secretary's priorities.

Established in 1949, the Bureau of Legislative Affairs works to advance the mission and legislative priorities of the U.S. Department of State in the U.S. Congress. "H" reports directly to the Secretary of State and coordinates all official communications, notifications, briefings, and hearings between the Department and Capitol Hill. It is the lead bureau in advancing the department's congressional review and approval of all actions requiring congressional notification and/or consultation, including most security and foreign assistance-related matters. The bureau works with internal stakeholders to: facilitate oversight requests; plan, manage, and host all official congressional member and staff travel overseas (CODELs); and provide technical assistance and department views on legislation affecting foreign policy or Department equities. The bureau also has the critical responsibility of supporting the direct link between Congress and Americans experiencing a crisis while overseas. For this reason, H is a core participant in the department's emergency response mechanisms to facilitate coordinated Congressional outreach and response during major events and emergencies.

In 2021 alone, the Bureau handled over 1,700 policy-related congressional briefings, calls, and meetings; 76 congressional hearings with State Department witnesses; 123 State Department nominees; 550 congressional reports; 1,485 pieces of congressional correspondence; and over 100 congressional member and staff overseas delegations.

== Organization ==
The bureau is headed by the Assistant Secretary of State for Legislative Affairs, along with three Deputy Assistant Secretaries, who advises the Secretary of State on legislative matters, directs the Bureau of Legislative Affairs, and acts as the department's principal liaison with Congress. The Bureau consists of approximately 60-70 direct hire U.S. employees and leads all department communications and activities with 535 Members of Congress, their offices, and committee staffs. H's responsibility advocating on behalf of the Secretary, the department, and the United States' foreign policy goals. The bureau's organization is designed to work closely with congressional oversight committees and leadership. The Bureau has five offices which consist of:

- Bureau Operations
- Capitol Hill Liaison Office
- Office of House Affairs
- Office of Senate Affairs
- Office of Regional, Global, and Functional Affairs

The Secretary of State is the principal Congressional relations officer of the department. The bureau supports the secretary by ensuring that the administration's foreign policy priorities are reflected throughout the legislative process. The bureau aims to succeed in its overall mission by seeking passage of relevant foreign policy legislation and appropriations, obtaining advice and consent to treaties, as well as confirmation of the president's departmental and ambassadorial nominees by the Senate. Additionally, the bureau coordinates the annual testimony provided by the secretary to Congressional committees with jurisdiction over state programs to explain department priorities and budget requirements. These Congressional Committees are:

- House of Representatives:
  - House Committee on Foreign Affairs
  - House Appropriations Subcommittee on State, Foreign Operations, and Related Programs
- Senate:
  - Senate Foreign Relations Committee
  - Senate Appropriations Subcommittee on State, Foreign Operations, and Related Programs
