= Thruston Morton =

American politician (1907–1982)

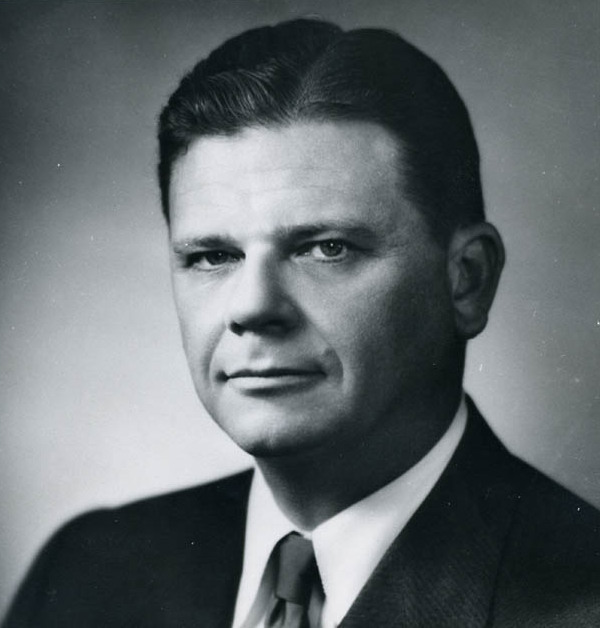

Chair of the Republican National Committee
- In office July 1, 1959 – June 2, 1961
- Preceded by: Hugh Meade Alcorn Jr.
- Succeeded by: William E. Miller

United States Senator from Kentucky
- In office January 3, 1957 – December 16, 1968
- Preceded by: Earle Clements
- Succeeded by: Marlow Cook

4th Assistant Secretary of State for Legislative Affairs
- In office January 30, 1953 – February 29, 1956
- President: Dwight D. Eisenhower
- Preceded by: Jack K. McFall
- Succeeded by: Robert C. Hill

Member of the U.S. House of Representatives from Kentucky's 3rd district
- In office January 3, 1947 – January 3, 1953
- Preceded by: Emmet O'Neal
- Succeeded by: John M. Robsion Jr.

Personal details
- Born: Thruston Ballard Morton; August 19, 1907 Louisville, Kentucky, U.S.
- Died: August 14, 1982 (aged 74) Louisville, Kentucky, U.S.
- Resting place: Cave Hill Cemetery; Louisville, Kentucky, U.S.
- Party: Republican
- Spouse: Belle Clay Lyons
- Children: 2
- Relatives: Rogers Morton (brother)
- Education: Yale University (BA)

Military service
- Allegiance: United States
- Branch/service: United States Navy
- Unit: United States Naval Reserve
- Battles/wars: World War II

Thruston Ballard Morton (August 19, 1907 – August 14, 1982) was an American politician. A Republican, Morton represented Kentucky's 3rd congressional district in the U.S. House of Representatives from 1947 to 1953 and Kentucky in the U.S. Senate from 1957 to 1968. From 1953 to 1956, Morton was Assistant Secretary of State for Legislative Affairs under President Dwight D. Eisenhower. He was later chair of the Republican National Committee from 1959 to 1961.

== Early life ==
Morton was born on August 19, 1907, in Louisville, Kentucky, to Dave Morton and his wife, Mary Ballard, descended from pioneer settlers of the area. He had a brother, Rogers Clark Ballard Morton, who also became a politician, and a sister, Jane, who survived him. He attended local public schools and the Woodberry Forest School, before he entered Yale University. He received a B.A. there in 1929.

Morton then worked in the family business, Ballard & Ballard Flour Milling, becoming its chairman of the board before the company was sold to the Pillsbury Company.

A lifelong Episcopalian, he married Belle Clay Lyons and was survived by their two sons, Clay Lyons Morton and Thruston Ballard Morton Jr., and five grandchildren.

His brother, Rogers Clark Ballard Morton, represented Maryland in the U.S. House of Representatives from 1963 through 1971. The Morton brothers served together in the U.S. Congress from 1963 to 1968, with Thruston as a U.S. Senator representing Kentucky and Rogers as a U.S. Representative representing Maryland. Both brothers also served as chair of the Republican National Committee.

Rogers Morton subsequently became U.S. Secretary of the Interior in the administration of Presidents Richard Nixon and Gerald Ford, and then became U.S. Secretary of Commerce under Ford, before chairing Ford's re-election campaign in 1976.

== Political career ==
=== U.S. House of Representatives ===
After naval service in World War II, Morton defeated the 12-year Democratic incumbent, Rep. Emmet O'Neal, in the 1946 election in his native Louisville area (Kentucky's 3rd congressional district), 61,899 votes to 44,599 votes. Having been re-elected in 1948 and 1950, Morton served three terms in the House, from January 3, 1947, to January 3, 1953.

=== U.S. Assistant Secretary of State ===
Morton did not seek re-election in 1952, saying he had been away from home for eleven "extremely hard years," five in the Navy and six in Congress. But then in December, the new Eisenhower Administration announced his appointment as Assistant Secretary of State for Congressional Relations, garnering legislators' support for Eisenhower's foreign policy.

=== U.S. Senate ===
In 1956, Morton, by a very narrow margin, defeated the Democratic incumbent, Sen. Earle Clements from Kentucky, a former governor of Kentucky and then-majority whip in the U.S. Senate, by 506,903 votes to 499,922. Morton was re-elected to a second term in the U.S. Senate in 1962, defeating the Democratic lieutenant governor and former mayor of Louisville, Wilson W. Wyatt. Morton served from January 3, 1957, until December 16, 1968, when he resigned, allowing successor Marlow Cook to take office two weeks early and gain Senate seniority.

In the Senate, Morton was considered a moderate. He voted in favor of the Senate amendment to the Civil Rights Act of 1957 on August 7, 1957, but did not vote on the House amendment to the bill on August 29, 1957. Morton voted in favor of the Civil Rights Acts of 1960, 1964, and 1968, as well as the 24th Amendment to the U.S. Constitution, the Voting Rights Act of 1965, and the confirmation of Thurgood Marshall to the U.S. Supreme Court. A compromise that Morton proposed to guarantee jury trials in all criminal contempt cases except for voting rights proved, with the assistance of Sens. Everett Dirksen from Illinois and Bourke Hickenlooper from Iowa, crucial in passing the 1964 Civil Rights Act.

Morton was the chair of the Republican National Committee from 1959 to 1961 and chaired the Republican National Convention of 1964.

When Morton retired, he surprised many, who considered him at the peak of his political power. However, he opposed the Vietnam War despite being criticized by Rep. William Cowger from Kentucky. Also, he was both depressed by the urban violence after the April 1968 assassination of Martin Luther King Jr. and that of Robert F. Kennedy a few weeks later, and disappointed in his party's failure to address the broader social issues. He also ultimately counseled then-President Lyndon Johnson to decline to seek re-election, and he supported the unsuccessful presidential candidacy of Gov. Nelson Rockefeller of New York.

Morton is interviewed in the 1968 documentary film In the Year of the Pig, and another interview is available through the Lyndon Baines Johnson Presidential Library.

=== Consideration for 1960 vice presidential nomination ===
Morton was among the last two candidates considered by Richard Nixon as a vice presidential running mate in 1960. As a Midwesterner, however, he was considered to have a regional appeal where Nixon already figured to poll strongly, so Nixon instead chose Henry Cabot Lodge Jr. of Massachusetts.

== Later life ==
After his retirement from the U.S. Senate, Morton served as vice chairman of Liberty National Bank in Louisville, president of the American Horse Council, and chairman of the board of Churchill Downs, and he served as one of the directors of the University of Louisville, Pillsbury Company, Pittston Company, Louisville Board of Trade, Texas Gas Company, R.J. Reynolds Company, and the Ohio Valley Assembly.

Morton died after many years of declining health. His brother Rogers Morton had died three years previously, and his wife, Belle, survived him by more than a decade. He was interred at Cave Hill Cemetery in Louisville.

== Legacy ==
His papers are held by Louisville's Filson Historical Society, which his grandfather had revitalized. The Kentucky Digital Library has a collection of his speeches.

U.S. House of Representatives
Preceded by Emmet O'Neal	Member of the U.S. House of Representatives from Kentucky's 3rd congressional district 1947–1953	Succeeded by John Robsion
Political offices
Preceded by Jack K. McFall	Assistant Secretary of State for Legislative Affairs; 1953–1956	Succeeded by Robert C. Hill
Party political offices
Preceded by Charles I. Dawson	Republican nominee for U.S. Senator from Kentucky (Class 3); 1956, 1962	Succeeded by Marlow Cook
Preceded by Meade Alcorn	Chair of the Republican National Committee; 1959–1961	Succeeded by William E. Miller
Preceded by Barry Goldwater	Chair of the National Republican Senatorial Committee; 1963–1967	Succeeded by George Murphy
U.S. Senate
Preceded by Earle Clements	U.S. Senator (Class 3) from Kentucky; 1957–1968; Served alongside: John Sherman Cooper	Succeeded by Marlow Cook
