= J. Edward Fox =

American government official

21st Assistant Secretary of State for Legislative Affairs
- In office June 18, 1986 – February 21, 1989
- President: Ronald Reagan
- Preceded by: William L. Ball
- Succeeded by: Janet G. Mullins Grissom

Personal details
- Born: December 1, 1948 (age 76); Columbus, Ohio, U.S.
- Children: 3
- Education: Ohio State University (BA); George Washington University (MA)

J. Edward Fox (born December 1, 1948) is an American political advisor who served in the United States Department of State and the United States Department of Homeland Security.

== Early life and education ==
Fox was born in Columbus, Ohio. He earned a Bachelor of Arts degree in political science from Ohio State University in 1972 and a Master of Arts in legislative affairs from George Washington University in 1976.

== Career ==
Fox began his career on Capitol Hill, where he worked on the personal staff of two members of the United States Congress. He later served on the professional staff of the United States House Committee on Foreign Affairs, as a specialist on the subcommittees on Asia, Africa, and Latin America.

In 1985, Fox moved to the White House as special assistant to the president for legislative affairs. The next year, President Ronald Reagan nominated Fox as assistant secretary of state for legislative affairs. He remained in the position from June 18, 1986, until February 21, 1989.

Fox left government service in 1989, joining Mintz, Levin, Cohn, Ferris, Glovsky, and Popeo as managing director of the firm's governmental and international affairs group. He also formed his own consulting firm, Fox & Associates.

After eleven years at Mintz Levin, Fox returned to the government in 1989. He was sworn in as assistant administrator of the United States Agency for International Development's Bureau for Legislative and Public Affairs on November 6, 2001. In April 2007, United States Secretary of Homeland Security Michael Chertoff appointed Fox assistant secretary of homeland security for public affairs.

== Personal life ==
Fox is married with three adult children, Abigail, Katharine and James Edward III.
