= 1962 United States Senate election in Kentucky =

- November 6, 1962
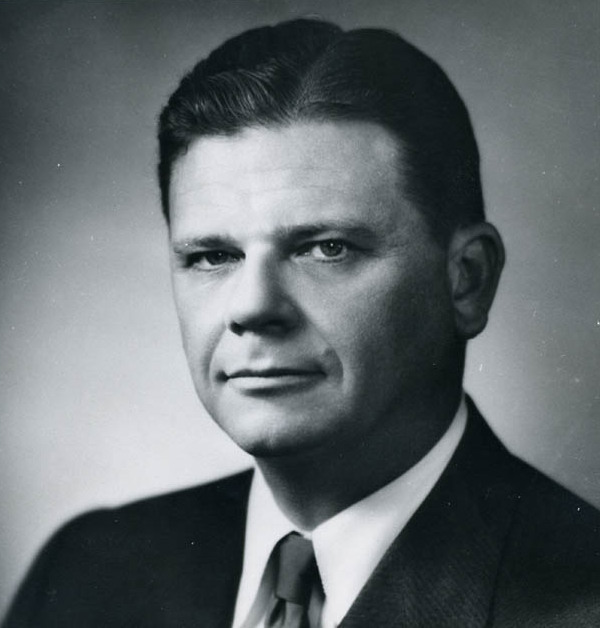

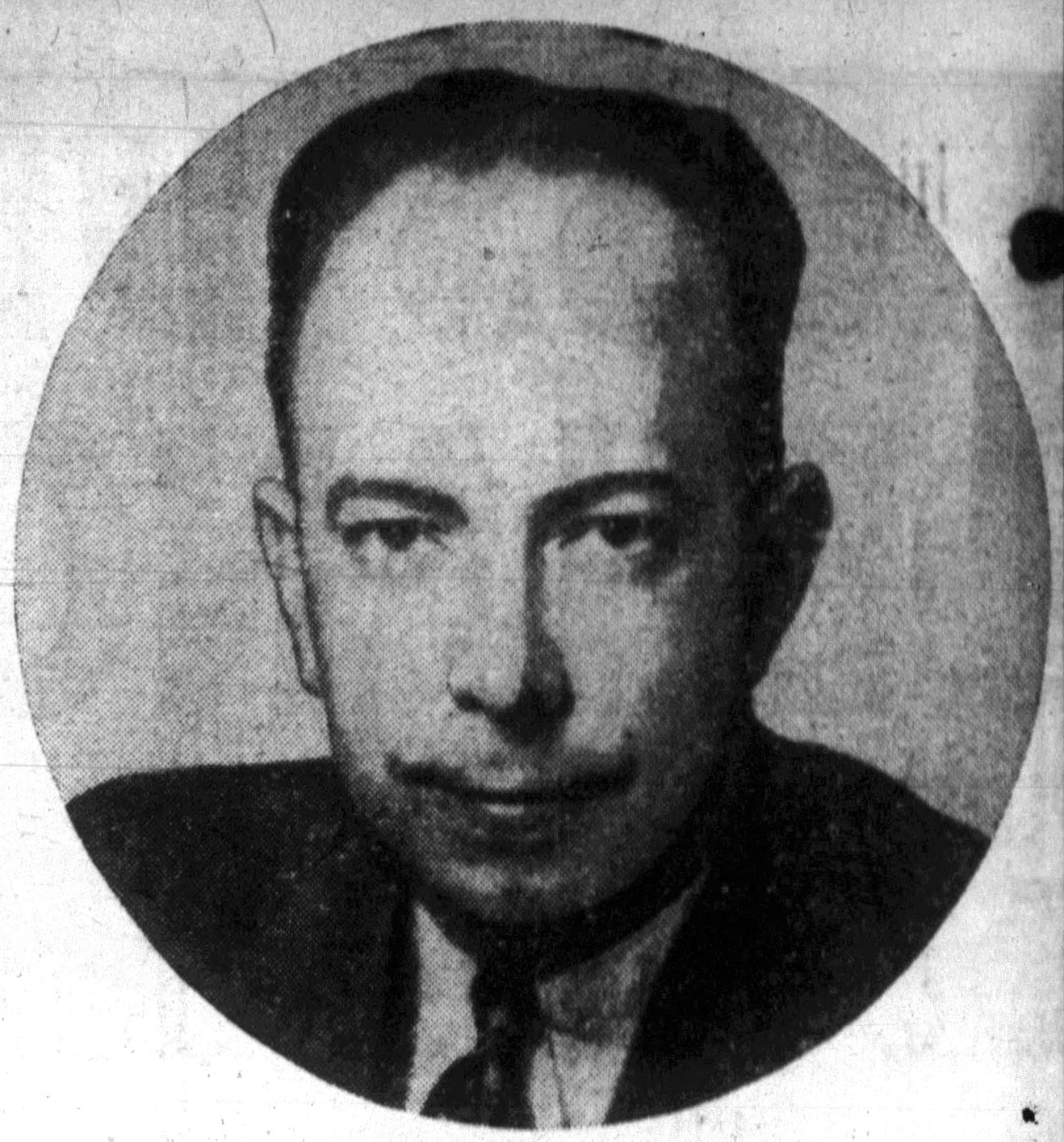
Nominee	Thruston Ballard Morton	Wilson W. Wyatt
Party	Republican	Democratic
Popular vote	432,648	387,440
Percentage	52.76%	47.24%
- County results Morton: 50–60% 60–70% 70–80% 80–90% Wyatt: 50–60% 60–70% 70–80%
U.S. senator before election
Thruston Ballard Morton
Republican
Elected U.S. Senator
Thruston Ballard Morton
Republican

The 1962 United States Senate election in Kentucky took place on November 6, 1962. Incumbent Republican Senator Thruston Ballard Morton won re-election to a second term.

== Primary elections ==
Primary elections were held on May 29, 1962.

=== Republican primary ===
==== Candidates ====
- Thurman Jerome Hamlin, perennial candidate
- Thruston Ballard Morton, incumbent U.S. Senator

==== Results ====
Republican primary results
Party	Candidate	Votes	%
Republican	Thruston Ballard Morton (incumbent)	41,892	91.19
Republican	Thurman J. Hamlin	4,048	8.81
Total votes		45,940	100.00

=== Democratic primary ===
==== Candidates ====
- James L. Delk, perennial candidate
- Marion Vance, attorney
- Wilson W. Wyatt, incumbent Lieutenant Governor of Kentucky

==== Results ====
Democratic primary results
Party	Candidate	Votes	%
Democratic	Wilson W. Wyatt	127,403	77.03
Democratic	Marion Vance	28,513	17.24
Democratic	James L. Delk	9,483	5.73
Total votes		165,399	100.00

== General election ==
=== Results ===
1962 United States Senate election in Kentucky
Party	Candidate	Votes	%
Republican	Thruston Ballard Morton (Incumbent)	432,648	52.76
Democratic	Wilson W. Wyatt	387,440	47.24
Majority		45,208	5.52
Turnout		820,088	
Republican hold			

== See also ==
- 1962 United States Senate elections

== Bibliography ==
- Congressional Elections, 1946-1996. Washington, D.C.: Congressional Quarterly Inc. 1998. ISBN 1-56802-248-4.
- Scammon, Richard M., ed. (1964). America Votes 5: a handbook of contemporary American election statistics, 1962. Washington, D.C.: Governmental Affairs Institute.
