= Ron Kaufman =

American author

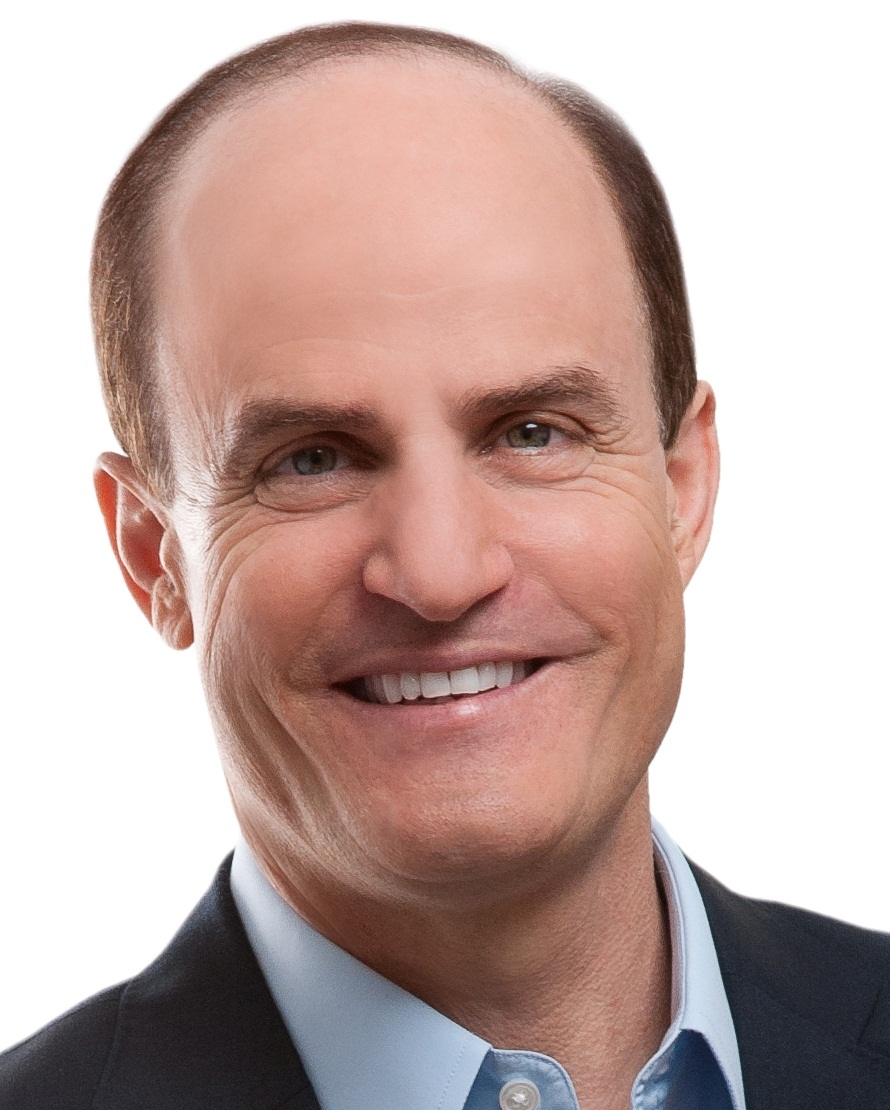
- Education: Brown University
- Occupations: Author, consultant, speaker, educator
- Notable work: Uplifting Service
- Awards: Ultimate Hall of Fame (2014), Asia Professional Speakers Lifetime Achievement Award (2016), GlobalGurus No. 1 Customer Service Guru (2018–2025)
- Website: www.ronkaufman.com

Ron Kaufman is an American author, consultant, speaker, and educator. He is the author of the USA Today and The New York Times bestseller Uplifting Service.

== Biography ==
=== Early life and education ===
Kaufman attended Staples High School in Westport, Connecticut. After high school, Kaufman enrolled at Brown University, where he founded and captained the university's Ultimate frisbee team in 1974. His studies at Brown included international political history, and he spent time studying abroad with the Institute of European Studies and Vanderbilt in France.

=== Career ===
After graduating Kaufman founded Discovering the World. Through this company, he organized tournaments, festivals, and community events worldwide, including the "International Frisbee Friendship Tour" in Europe, China, and the Soviet Union. He also served as Master of ceremonies at various events, including the Smithsonian Frisbee Festival in Washington, D.C., and the World Frisbee Championships at the Rose Bowl in California. His work in this field continued through the 1980s. Kaufman sold Discovering the World in 1985.

In October 2014 he was inducted into the Ultimate Hall of Fame.

In 1990, Kaufman moved to Singapore to work with Singapore Airlines and the government's National Productivity Board. He was involved in establishing the Service Quality Centre and served the Workforce Development Agency's Go the Extra Mile for Service (GEMS) Committee. His other company, Ron Kaufman Pte Ltd, was established in 1993 to manage his speaking and publishing engagements. In 1994, Kaufman created the Uplifting Service model (initially called UP! Your Service), a method aimed at transforming service culture in organizations. Kaufman worked with companies in hospitality, telecommunications, healthcare, finance, and other areas. He worked with government agencies and multinational corporations, including Microsoft, Coca-Cola, HP, Singapore Airlines, Xerox, Nokia Siemens Networks, Marina Bay Sands, Wipro, Air Mauritius and more.

Since 1990, Kaufman has delivered speeches at global conferences and corporate events. He has spoken for organizations including Google, Pfizer, Sony, HSBC, Harvard Business School, and Toyota, discussing strategies for fostering a positive service culture and improving customer satisfaction. He is a columnist at Bloomberg Businessweek and the author of 15 books on service, business and inspiration, including The New York Times bestseller Uplifting Service: The Proven Path to Delighting Your and Customers, Colleagues, and Everyone Else You Meet. He has been featured in The Wall Street Journal, The New York Times, USA Today, Business Insider and more.

Kaufman is a professional member of the Author's Guild, Global Speakers Federation, and International Association of Learning Providers.

== Selected publications ==
- Kaufman, Ron (2012). Uplifting service: the proven path to delighting your customers, colleagues, and everyone else you meet. New York, NY: Evolve Publishing. ISBN 978-0-9847625-0-7.
- Kaufman, Ron (2018). UP! Your Service Action Steps: Strategies and Action Steps to Delight Your Customers Now! Evolve Publishing. ISBN 9789810740603.
- Kaufman, Ron (2018). UP! Your Service Great Ideas: Tools, Tips and Proven Techniques to Lift Your Service Higher. Evolve Publishing. ISBN 9789810740627.
- Kaufman, Ron (2018). Lift Me UP! You Make a Difference: Challenging Quotes and Encouraging Notes to Move You into Action! Evolve Publishing. ISBN 978-9-8105292-9-1.
- Kaufman, Ron (2005). Lift Me UP! Words of Wisdom: Remarkable Quotes and Heart-Filled Notes to Open Up Your Mind! ISBN 9789810740702.
- Kaufman, Ron (2005). Lift Me UP! Let's Make Money: Priceless Quotes and Anecdotes to Leverage Your Good Fortune! ISBN 9789810740641
- Kaufman, Ron (2002). UP! Your Service New Insights: True Stories of Winners and Losers in the Quest for Superior Service. ISBN 9789810740610
