= Powell A. Moore =

American politician and public servant

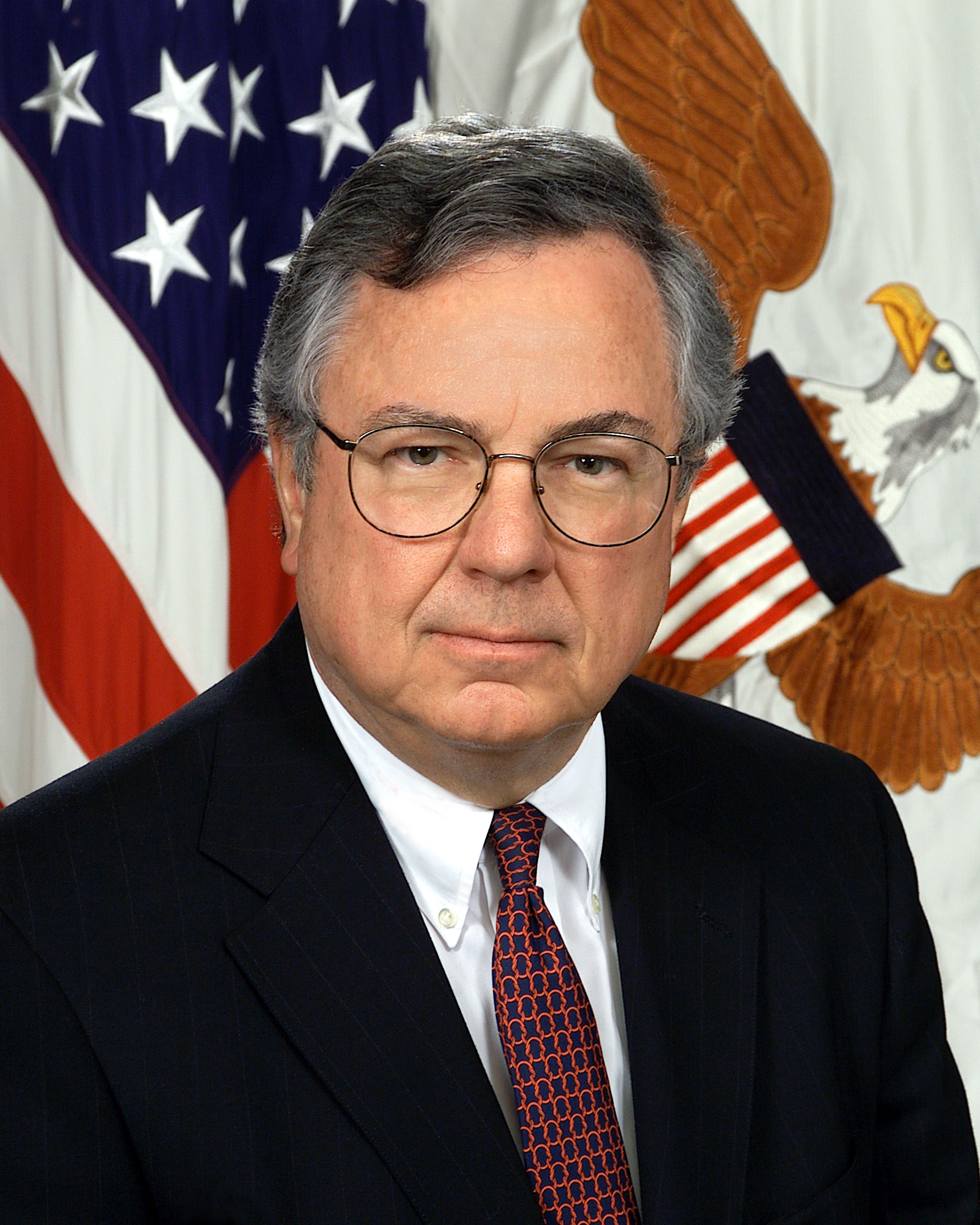

United States Representative to the Organization for Security and Co-operation in Europe
- In office 2006–2009
- President: George W. Bush

Assistant Secretary of Defense for Legislative Affairs
- In office May 4, 2001 – December 2004
- President: George W. Bush
- Preceded by: John K. Veroneau
- Succeeded by: Daniel R. Stanley

18th Assistant Secretary of State for Legislative Affairs
- In office February 8, 1982 – August 5, 1983
- President: Ronald Reagan
- Preceded by: Richard M. Fairbanks
- Succeeded by: William Tapley Bennett Jr.

Personal details
- Born: Powell Allen Moore; January 5, 1938 Milledgeville, Georgia, U.S.
- Died: August 13, 2018 (aged 80) Washington, D.C., U.S.
- Party: Republican
- Education: Georgia Military College; University of Georgia

Military service
- Allegiance: United States
- Branch/service: United States Army
- Years of service: 1959–1963
- Rank: Captain

Powell Allen Moore (January 5, 1938 – August 13, 2018) was an American Republican Party politician and public servant, who was an official in the United States Department of State and the United States Department of Defense.

== Early life and education ==
A native of Milledgeville, Georgia, Powell A. Moore was educated at the Georgia Military College, and then the University of Georgia, from which he received his A.B.J. in Journalism in 1959.

== Military career ==
After college, Moore joined the United States Army, serving in the infantry. He was stationed in West Germany and was present there when the Berlin Wall was erected. He served for four years and attained the rank of captain.

== Political career ==
Upon leaving the Army, Moore joined the United States Department of Justice as Deputy Director of Public Information. In 1966, he became press secretary for Sen. Richard Russell, Jr. (D–GA), a position he held until Senator Russell's death in January 1971. In 1973 and 1974, Moore was a Senior White House Legislative aide under Presidents Richard Nixon and Gerald Ford. He returned to the White House Legislative Staff in 1981 under President Ronald Reagan. During this period, Moore was involved in the White House's efforts to have Sandra Day O'Connor confirmed as a member of the United States Supreme Court.

In 1982, President Reagan nominated Moore as Assistant Secretary of State for Legislative Affairs and Moore subsequently held this office from February 8, 1982, until August 5, 1983.

From 1998 to 2001, Moore was the chief of staff of Sen. Fred Thompson (R–TN).

In 2001, President George W. Bush nominated Moore as Assistant Secretary of Defense for Legislative Affairs, and Moore was sworn in on May 4, 2001.

Moore left the United States Department of Defense in December 2004, joining McKenna, Long & Aldridge.

He returned to government service in 2006 when United States Secretary of Defense Donald Rumsfeld named Moore as his representative to the Organization for Security and Co-operation in Europe.

He left government service in 2009, joining Venable LLP.

== Death ==
Moore died in Washington, D.C., on August 13, 2018, at the age of 80.

Government offices
Preceded by Richard M. Fairbanks	Assistant Secretary of State for Legislative Affairs; February 8, 1982 – August 5, 1983	Succeeded by William Tapley Bennett Jr.
