= Paul V. Kelly =

United States Marine (born 1947)

25th Assistant Secretary of State for Legislative Affairs
- In office June 1, 2001 – January 24, 2005
- President: George W. Bush
- Preceded by: Barbara Larkin
- Succeeded by: Jeffrey Bergner

Personal details
- Born: Paul Vincent Kelly; 1947 (age 78–79)
- Education: Merrimack College; Lowell Technological Institute

Military service
- Allegiance: United States
- Branch/service: United States Marine Corps

Paul Vincent Kelly (born 1947) is a United States Marine who served as Assistant Secretary of State for Legislative Affairs from 2001 to 2005.

== Biography ==
Paul V. Kelly was born in 1947 and was educated at Merrimack College, from which he received a bachelor's degree and the Lowell Technological Institute, receiving a master's degree.

Kelly served thirty years in the United States Marine Corps. In 1988, he became the Marine Corps' liaison to the United States Senate Appropriations Subcommittee on Defense. He became Director of the Marine Corps War College in 1994, holding that position until 1997 when he became President of the United States Department of the Navy's Physical Evaluation Board.

In April 2001, President of the United States George W. Bush nominated Col. Kelly as Assistant Secretary of State for Legislative Affairs and he subsequently held this office from June 1, 2001 until January 24, 2005.

Government offices
Preceded by Barbara Larkin	Assistant Secretary of State for Legislative Affairs; June 1, 2001 – January 24, 2005	Succeeded by Jeffrey Bergner
