= Paul D. Guaglianone =

American civil servant

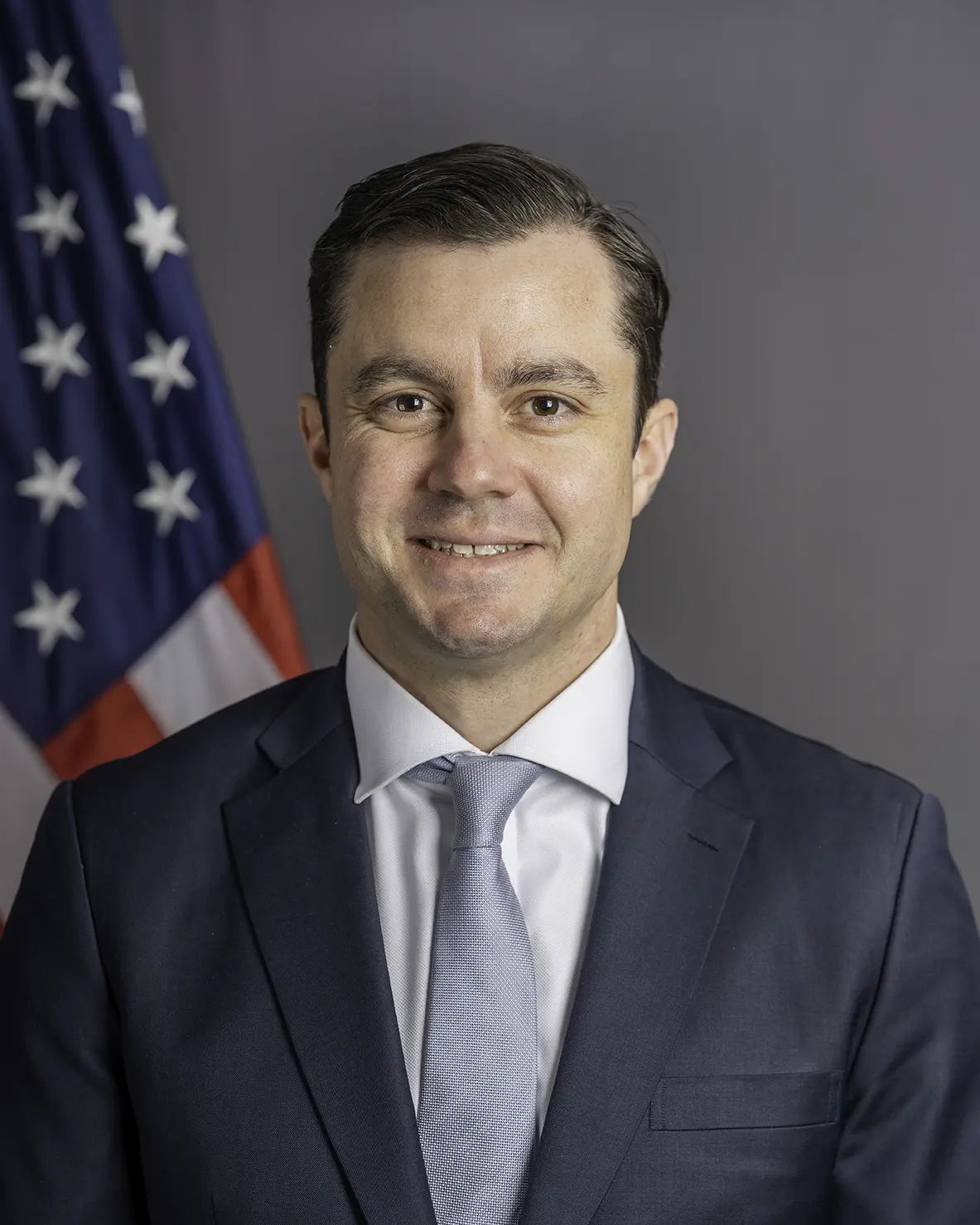

Assistant Secretary of State for Legislative Affairs
- Acting
- In office February 1, 2025 – June 23, 2026
- President: Donald Trump
- Preceded by: Philip Laidlaw (acting)
- Succeeded by: Kaitlyn Wolfe (acting)

Paul D. Guaglianone is an American civil servant who had served as Deputy Assistant Secretary of State for Legislative Affairs at the US Department of State.

== Career ==
In 2023, Guaglianone was appointed as a legislative director for Senate Pete Ricketts.

In March 2025, Guaglianone sent a congressional notification outlining the Trump Administration's plans to propose legislation to "abolish USAID as an independent establishment" within its budget request to Congress for fiscal year 2026.

In May 2025 Guaglione wrote the cover letter of a congressional notification to congress titled "State Department Restructuring Memo. Congressional Note 25-032", outlining the restructuring of the State Department, including the creation of an Office of Remigration.
