= Jack K. McFall =

American diplomat (1905–1990)

3rd Assistant Secretary of State for Legislative Affairs
- In office October 15, 1949 – September 9, 1952
- Preceded by: Ernest A. Gross
- Succeeded by: Thruston Ballard Morton

Personal details
- Born: September 23, 1905 Tacoma, Washington, U.S.
- Died: June 16, 1990 (aged 84)
- Education: Georgetown University

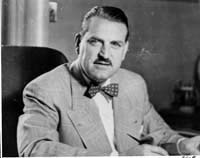
Jack K. McFall

Jack Kirkham McFall (September 23, 1905 – June 16, 1990) was an American diplomat.

== Biography ==
Jack K. McFall was born in Tacoma, Washington. He was raised in Denver, Colorado, and Kansas City, Missouri, where he graduated from Northeast High School. He then moved to Gary, Indiana, and worked in a bank. In 1925, McFall enrolled in the Georgetown University School of Foreign Service; he graduated with a bachelor's degree in foreign service in 1929. While he was attending Georgetown, McFall worked for Sen. Arthur Raymond Robinson (R—IN) for three years, and in 1928 worked for the United States House Committee on Appropriations upon a recommendation from Rep. William R. Wood (R—IN-10).

McFall had intended to join the United States Foreign Service after college, but in the wake of the Wall Street crash of 1929, the Foreign Service imposed a hiring freeze. McFall therefore continued working on the staff of the Appropriations Committee, attending night classes at the National University law school (later absorbed by the Georgetown University Law Center) and acquiring an LL.B. in 1933. He was admitted to the bar of the District of Columbia in 1933. McFall worked on the staff of the Appropriations Committee until World War II when he joined the United States Navy, serving as a Commander. With the end of the war, McFall returned to the staff of the Appropriations Committee.

McFall finally succeeded in joining the United States Foreign Service in 1947. His first posting as a Foreign Service Officer was in Montreal 1947–49. He spent 1949 in Athens.

Later in 1949, President of the United States Harry Truman nominated McFall as Assistant Secretary of State for Legislative Affairs; he held this office from October 15, 1949, until September 9, 1952.

In September 1952, President Truman nominated McFall as United States Minister to Finland and McFall presented his credentials on November 15, 1952. On September 10, 1954, the United States legation in Helsinki was upgraded to an embassy, and McFall became a full Ambassador. He served as United States Ambassador to Finland until September 19, 1955.

McFall retired from government service in 1956. In retirement, he served as a member of the board of governors of the Washington Institute of Foreign Affairs.

Government offices
Preceded by Ernest A. Gross	Assistant Secretary of State for Legislative Affairs; October 15, 1949 – September 9, 1952	Succeeded by Thruston Ballard Morton
Diplomatic posts
Preceded by John Moors Cabot	United States Ambassador to Finland; November 15, 1952 – September 19, 1955	Succeeded by John D. Hickerson
