= Jeffrey Bergner =

American political scientist (born 1946)

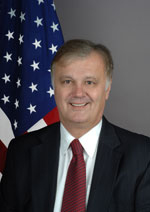
- Official portrait, c. 2006

26th United States Assistant Secretary of State for Legislative Affairs
- In office November 9, 2005 – June 27, 2008
- President: George W. Bush
- Preceded by: Paul V. Kelly
- Succeeded by: Matthew A. Reynolds

Personal details
- Born: Jeffrey Thomas Bergner; 1946 (age 79–80)
- Party: Republican
- Education: Carleton College (BA); Princeton University (MA, PhD)

Jeffrey Thomas Bergner (born 1946) is an American foreign policy expert. He is a visiting lecturer at the Batten School of Public Policy and Leadership at the University of Virginia. He is the author of The Origin of Formalism in Social Science, The New Superpowers, Against Modern Humanism, The Vanishing Congress, and Turning Point: Judaism, Christianity and Islam Confront Greek Philosophy. He is also co-author (with Lisa Spiller) of Branding the Candidate and several other books concerning American politics and foreign affairs.

He served as managing partner of Bergner Bockorny, a government relations firm specializing in tax, trade and international issues

Bergner was Policy Director, Lugar for President Campaign; Staff Director, Senate Committee on Foreign Relations; Chief of Staff/Legislative Director, Senator Richard Lugar; Assistant Professor, Department of Political Science, University of Pennsylvania; Visiting Assistant Professor, Department of Political Science, University of Michigan; visiting professor at Georgetown University and Visiting Professor of American Studies at Christopher Newport University in Newport News, VA.

Bergner served as Assistant Secretary of State for Legislative Affairs from 2005 until July 2008.

Bergner has had affiliations with the Asia Foundation, the Calvert Institute for Public Policy, the Hudson Institute, Business Executives for National Security and the Project for the New American Century.

Bergner received his BA from Carleton College (1969), MA from Princeton University (1971), and PhD from Princeton (1973).

Government offices
Preceded by Paul V. Kelly	Assistant Secretary of State for Legislative Affairs; 2005–2008	Succeeded by Matthew A. Reynolds
