= Mary Elizabeth Taylor =

American political aide

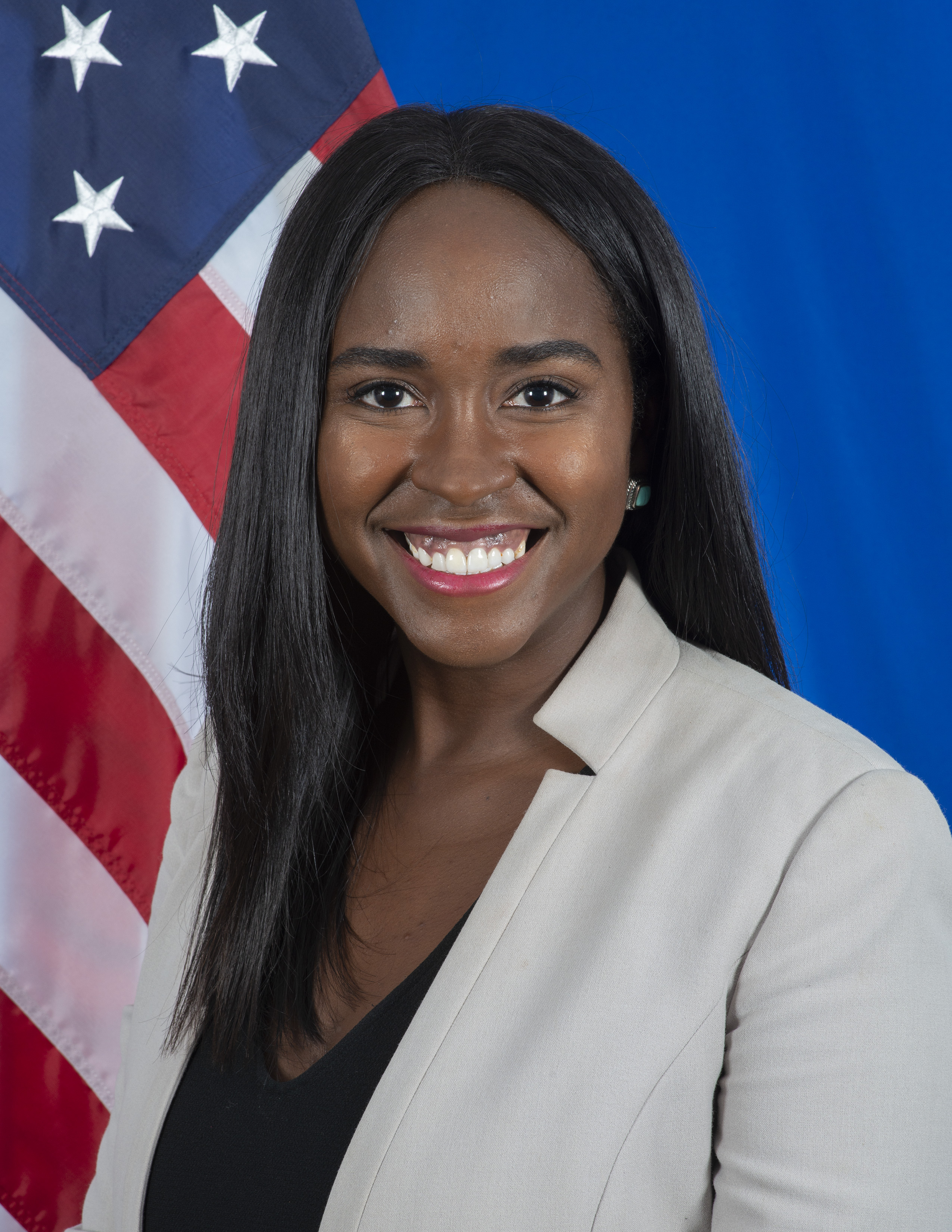

32nd Assistant Secretary of State for Legislative Affairs
- In office October 1, 2018 – July 3, 2020
- President: Donald Trump
- Preceded by: Mary Kirtley Waters
- Succeeded by: Naz Durakoğlu

Personal details
- Born: Washington D.C., United States
- Party: Republican
- Education: Bryn Mawr College (BA)

Mary Elizabeth Taylor is an American political aide who served as the Assistant Secretary of State for Legislative Affairs from 2018 to 2020. She resigned on July 3, 2020 in protest of the handling of the George Floyd protests by President Donald Trump. She previously served in the Trump White House as the Deputy Director of Legislative Affairs of Nominations.

== Early life and education ==
Taylor is a native of Washington, D.C. She earned a degree in political science from Bryn Mawr College and interned at Koch Industries as a college student.

== Career ==
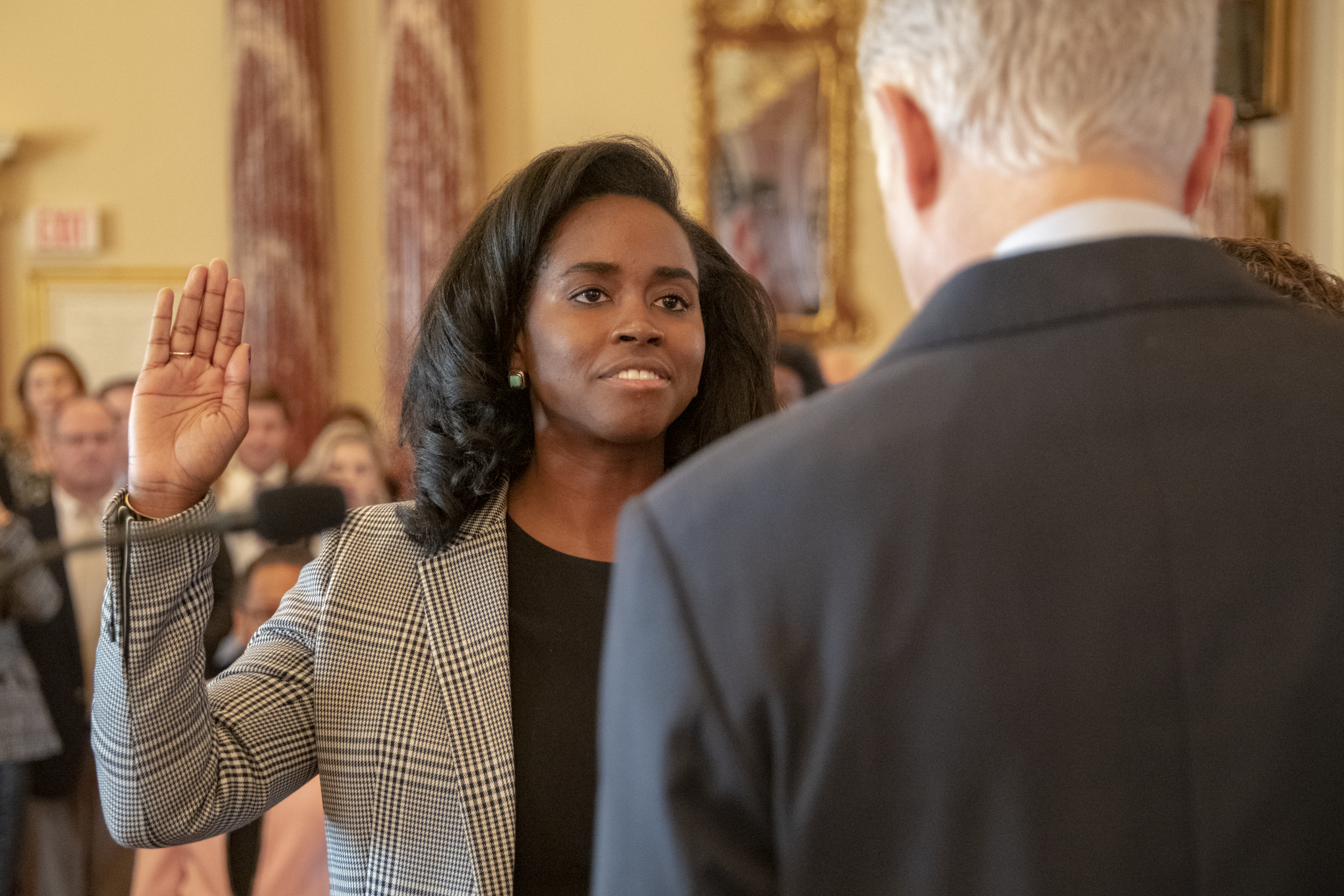
Taylor is sworn in by Associate Justice Neil Gorsuch as the Assistant Secretary for Legislative Affairs at the U.S. Department of State in Washington, D.C., on December 10, 2018.

=== Early political career ===
Taylor began her career in Capitol Hill as an intern for the United States Senate in July 2006. She also worked in the Senate Republican cloakroom as a Senior Cloakroom Assistant. Taylor previously worked as an aide to Senate Majority Leader Mitch McConnell.

=== Trump administration ===
Taylor served in the first Trump White House as Special Assistant to the President for Legislative Affairs. In March 2017, she gained social media attention for her presence at the confirmation hearings of Neil Gorsuch as Associate Justice of the Supreme Court of the United States. Taylor worked on Gorsuch's nomination team when he met with U.S. senators before the confirmation hearings. In December 2018, Gorsuch officiated at Taylor's formal swearing-in ceremony at the U.S. Department of State.

In 2018, she was listed on the Forbes 30 under 30 list.

==== Department of State ====
In 2018, Taylor was nominated to serve as Assistant Secretary of State for Legislative Affairs. Confirmed unanimously by the Senate in October 2018, Taylor became the first African-American woman and youngest to serve in this role, and the only African-American senior official in the State Department.

===== Trump-Ukraine Scandal =====
In May 2019, members of Congress criticized President Trump's abrupt recall of Ambassador Marie Yovanovitch from her post in Ukraine after Trump surrogates claimed that Yovanovitch, a career diplomat, was impeding Trump's efforts to pressure the Ukrainian government to investigate his political rival Joe Biden. Yovanovitch testified she had originally been asked in March 2019 to extend her tour in Ukraine through 2020 before her sudden recall in May. But on June 11, 2019, Taylor misled federal lawmakers about the circumstances of Yovanovitch's recall, writing instead that Yovanovitch had been "due to complete her three-year diplomatic assignment in Kyiv this summer" and that the date she left her post "align[ed] with the presidential transition in Ukraine," despite the fact the State Department has no common practice of changing ambassadors based on transitions in foreign leadership. Taylor also failed to mention that Yovanovitch had been previously asked to extend her post in Ukraine.

==== Resignation ====
On June 18, 2020, Taylor submitted her resignation from the State Department in response to President Donald Trump's handling of protests following the murder of George Floyd; she said "The President’s comments and actions surrounding racial injustice and Black Americans cut sharply against my core values and convictions.".

Government offices
Preceded by Mary Kirtley Waters	Assistant Secretary of State for Legislative Affairs; October 1, 2018 – July 3, 2020	Succeeded by Naz Durakoğlu
