= Layalina Productions =

American non-profit organization

Layalina Productions is a 501(c)(3) non-profit public diplomacy initiative based in Washington, D.C., that develops, produces and distributes television programming throughout the Middle East and North Africa. Inaugurated in March 2002, Layalina aims to dispel negative stereotypes of the other and help increase mutual understanding between the U.S. and Arab-speaking countries. The organization's following has been bipartisan, with leading foreign policy veterans and media experts from both Republican and Democratic backgrounds making up the organization's board of directors and board of counselors, including Henry A. Kissinger, Zbigniew Brzezinski, Sam Nunn, and former president George H. W. Bush.

== History and organization ==
Former ambassador Richard M. Fairbanks founded the non-profit in 2002 as a means of improving the United States' public diplomacy presence in the Middle East. At its inception, Layalina was envisioned as a broadcaster in its own right, transmitting programs to homes throughout the region. Upon consulting with colleagues, however, Fairbanks decided to take a more subtle tack first suggested by former Ambassador to Morocco Marc Ginsberg. Under this strategy, Layalina would seek to produce programs funded by private donors, then sell the rights to broadcasters already operating in the region. In this way, Layalina could avoid the mistrust associated with an overtly pro-American, U.S. Government-run broadcaster like Voice of America or Alhurra, yet still producing programming which could remain both popular and impactful. Convinced, Fairbanks adopted this course of action and shortly thereafter asked Ginsberg to join the organization as its President.

The standing lineup of Layalina's organizational leadership is as follows:

Chairman of the Board of Directors: Shannon Fairbanks

Vice Chairman of the Board of Directors: Richard H. Solomon

Honorary Chairman of the Board of Counselors: George H. W. Bush

President: Leon Shahabian

== Productions ==
Layalina has developed and produced a wide range of programs for the Middle Eastern market, from reality television to news analysis to documentaries.

- Yemeniettes
- Generation Entrepreneur
- On the Road in America, Seasons 1 - 3
- Life After Death
- American Caravan
- Back from the Brink
- Al-Sa'at (The Hour)
- Ben & Izzy
- Sister Cities
- Araeh (Opinions)

=== Yemeniettes ===
Yemeniettes was produced as a feature-length documentary for screening in the US and as two-episodes for broadcast in Yemen. It won Best Documentary, Best Vision of the Future and Best Innovation & Entrepreneurship awards at the Silicon Valley Film Festival in December 2013. It was also official selection to the Thin Line Film Festival, Cleveland International Film Festival, Millennium Film Festival and the Al Jazeera International Documentary Film Festival.

=== On the Road in America ===
Layalina's most successful, publicized series has been On the Road in America, a half-hour reality show following the journey of six young Arabs across the United States and documenting their encounters, misadventures and cultural exchanges along the way. Following its 2007 debut, New York Times writer Jacques Steinberg described the series as, "The sort of television show that Al Jazeera and MTV might produce if they could be coaxed together in front of an editing terminal." In its first season, the show earned the second-ranked spot for most-watched show in its time slot, averaging 4.5 million viewers per episode and earning double the viewership of MTV's Real World 2007, which runs on the same network. The second season of the show, which featured hour-long episodes, brought in an even larger audience at nine million viewers per episode. The most recent season of the show, On the Road in America, Season Three, is set to air on MBC4 in 2013.

=== American Caravan ===
In 2011, as a result of widespread popular demand for a reversal of On the Road in America's people-to-people tradeoff, Layalina began filming on American Caravan, an examination of six Americans on a post-Arab Spring journey through the Middle East. The series is set to be aired on MBC4, with a release date yet to be disclosed.

=== Life After Death ===
In 2008, Layalina reached a deal with MBC's al-Arabiya News Channel to air Life After Death, a documentary examining the effects of violent extremism on families across countries and cultures. In particular, the film follows the journey of the wife and daughter of a September 11 victim as they meet with victims of Spain's 3/11 Madrid train bombings and Jordan's 11/9 Amman hotel attacks, showing the damage caused by extremism regardless of nationality or religion. The film was met with critical acclaim, earning Best Documentary at the 2009 Beverly Hills Film Festival. In 2012, the documentary was re-aired on MBN subsidiary Al-Hurra throughout the Middle East.

=== Back From the Brink ===
A documentary examining the roots of violent extremism in three diverse communities across the globe and the efforts made by members of those communities to stop such ideology in its tracks. The documentary has been used as part of de-radicalization curricula by both the King Abdul Aziz Center for National Dialogue in Saudi Arabia and the Sindh Punjab Educational Foundation.

=== Ben & Izzy ===
A children's cartoon program following the friendship of two young boys from different backgrounds: Ben, an American with a love of sports, and Izzy, a Jordanian with a knack for technology. The show follows their time-traveling adventures and attempts to teach the lesson that "Ultimately, we don't need to be the same to get along!"

=== Al-Sa'at (The Hour) ===
An hour-long investigative news program on current events.

=== Sister Cities ===
Examines the cultural relationship that exists between cities sharing "sister city" status through the Sister Cities International Program created by President Eisenhower in 1956.

=== Araeh (Opinions) ===
A news commentary program featuring American and Arab thinkers answering questions from moderators and audience members on issues related to U.S.-Arab relations.

== Publications ==
Perspectives is a monthly publication which features views by academics and practitioners on public diplomacy and Arab media.

Published quarterly, the Layalina Chronicle publication details the activities of Layalina's staff.

Published biweekly as a peer-reviewed publication, the Layalina Review ran for nearly seven years and served as a source for public diplomacy and Arab Media, ending publication only with the departure of Managing Editor Anne Hagood. The first publication was printed July 8, 2005 and the last in May 2012.

== Funding ==
Layalina Productions is funded mainly by private individuals and foundations with an interest in promoting cultural understanding between America and the Arab world. The organization reported approximately $250,000 to the IRS in 2007, which more than doubled to about $530,000 in 2008 and increased to more than $2 million in 2009.[4]

== Criticism ==
In April 2010, MBC Television broadcast a show featuring the stars of On the Road in America along with Saudi writer Abdullah al-Tayer, MBC4 TV anchor Heba Jamal, Layalina's Vice President Leon Shahabian, and State Department spokesperson in the Arab World Ana Escrohema. They spoke about the controversial receptions of the show in the Arab World as well as its benefits in public diplomacy.

Several sources have questioned the program's audience reach and ability to win hearts and minds amid overwhelming political tension. The Financial Times, in a February 2007 review of On the Road in America, Season One, commented, "With the Middle East racked by conflicts, most of which involve the US, the political images will no doubt continue to overshadow lighter appeals for understanding between the Arab world and the US."
