= Richard M. Fairbanks =

American diplomat

17th Assistant Secretary of State for Legislative Affairs
- In office March 6, 1981 – January 26, 1982
- Preceded by: J. Brian Atwood
- Succeeded by: Powell A. Moore

Personal details
- Born: 1941
- Died: February 6, 2013 (aged 71–72)
- Education: Yale University (AB} Columbia University (JD)

Richard Monroe Fairbanks III (1941-February 6, 2013) was a United States lawyer, diplomat, and businessman.

== Biography ==
A native of Indianapolis, Indiana, Fairbanks was educated at Yale University, receiving an AB. After college, he served in the United States Navy as a Regular Officer. He then attended Columbia Law School and received a JD.

Fairbanks worked briefly in the nascent United States Environmental Protection Agency before joining the United States Domestic Policy Council in the White House Office in 1971. In late 1972, he became Associate Director for Natural Resources, Energy, and the Environment. Fairbanks left the White House in 1974 to help found a Washington, D.C.–based law firm, Ruckelshaus, Beveridge, & Fairbanks.

In 1981, U.S. president Ronald Reagan nominated Fairbanks as Assistant Secretary of State for Congressional Affairs. After Senate confirmation, he was sworn in on March 6, 1981, and held the office until January 26, 1982. In 1982, he was named a Special Advisor of the United States Secretary of State with the rank of Ambassador and the title of Special Negotiator for the Israel/Palestine peace process. In 1984, the Senate confirmed Fairbanks as an Ambassador-at-Large, with the task of developing Pacific Basin cooperative efforts for the U.S.

Fairbanks left government service and resumed the practice of law in September 1985, becoming a partner at the Washington, D.C., office of Paul, Hastings, Janofsky & Walker. He later served as the managing partner of Paul Hastings from December 1988 to February 1992. During this same time, from 1986 to 1992, he was the president of the U.S. National Advisory Committee of the Pacific Economic Cooperation Council. From 1988 to 1991, he also served on the Investment Policy Advisory Committee of the Office of the United States Trade Representative. In May 1991, President George H. W. Bush appointed Fairbanks as a member of the President's Task Force on US Government International Broadcasting.

In 1992, Fairbanks joined the Center for Strategic and International Studies as a senior counsel. From 1994 to 1999, he was CSIS's managing director for Domestic and International Issues and from May 1999 through March 2000, he was the president and CEO, after which he became one of the center's counsellors. He was also the founder and chairman of Layalina Productions, a non-profit corporation that develops and produces Arabic language programming for licensing to television networks in the Middle East and North Africa. He also served on the board of directors of Seacor Holdings, the General American Transportation Corporation, and Americans for Generational Equity, and he was a member of the Council on Foreign Relations.

Government offices
Preceded by J. Brian Atwood	Assistant Secretary of State for Legislative Affairs; March 6, 1981 – January 26, 1982	Succeeded by Powell A. Moore
