= Ernest A. Gross =

American diplomat (1906–1999)

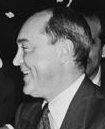

2nd Assistant Secretary of State for Legislative Affairs
- In office March 4, 1949 – October 13, 1949
- Preceded by: Dean Acheson
- Succeeded by: Jack K. McFall

3rd Legal Adviser of the Department of State
- In office August 16, 1947 – March 3, 1949
- Preceded by: Charles H. Fahy
- Succeeded by: Adrian S. Fisher

Personal details
- Born: September 23, 1906 Brooklyn, New York
- Died: May 2, 1999 (aged 92) New York, New York
- Spouse: Kathryn (nee Watson)
- Education: Harvard College; Oxford University

Ernest A. Gross (September 23, 1906 – May 2, 1999) was a United States diplomat and lawyer who headed the U.S. delegation to the United Nations in the lead-up to the Korean War.

== Biography ==
Ernest A. Gross was born in Brooklyn on September 23, 1906. He graduated from DeWitt Clinton High School and then attended Harvard College, graduating in 1927. He then attended Oxford University before returning to Cambridge, Massachusetts, to attend Harvard Law School. While at law school, he met Kathryn Watson, daughter of Sen. James Eli Watson (R—IN); the couple were married in 1933.

After graduating from law school, in 1931, Gross joined the United States Department of State as a legal adviser. Two years later, in 1933, he joined the National Recovery Administration, although he stayed for only a year before he moved on to become counsel to the National Association of Manufacturers. He returned to government service in 1940 when he became associate counsel of the National Labor Relations Board.

With the United States' entry into World War II, in 1943 Gross was commissioned as a captain in the United States Army. (He was later promoted to lieutenant colonel.) In the Army, Gross served as chief of the economic section of the Civil Affairs Division of the General Staff of the United States Department of War.

After the war, Gross rejoined the State Department, serving as Legal Adviser of the Department of State and as deputy to the Assistant Secretary of State for Occupied Areas (Gen. John H. Hilldring, then, from 1947, Charles E. Saltzman). In 1948, Gross signed the Convention on the Prevention and Punishment of the Crime of Genocide on behalf of the United States. From March through October 1949, Gross was the Assistant Secretary of State for Legislative Affairs.

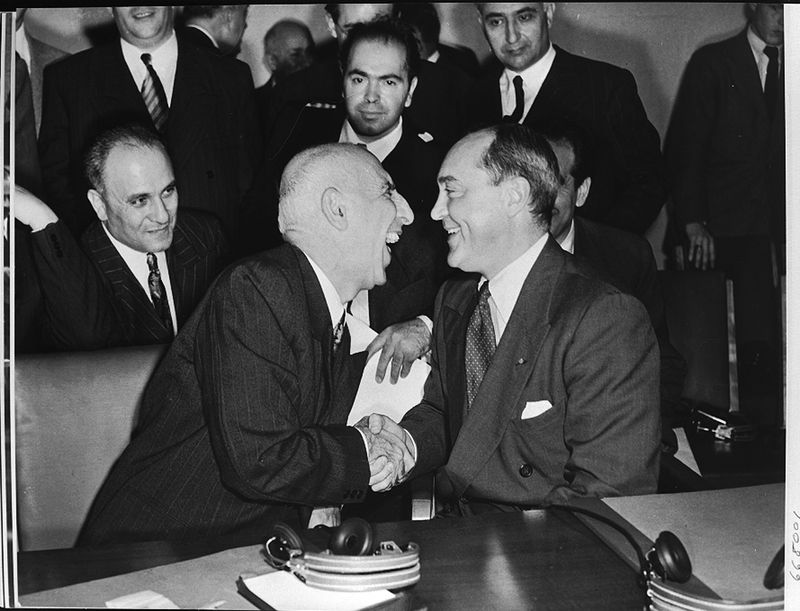
Mohammad Mosaddegh (left) and Ernest A. Gross at the United Nations, ca. 1951.

On October 11, 1949, United States Secretary of State Dean Acheson appointed Gross as the United States' deputy delegate to the United Nations. Only two months later, the chief delegate, Warren Austin, took a leave of absence, and Gross took over as acting head of the U.S. delegation to the U.N. The major issue facing the United Nations at that time was the Soviet Union's proposal that, with the conclusion of the Chinese Civil War, the Communist People's Republic of China should replace the Republic of China on the United Nations Security Council. On January 13, 1950, the Soviet delegate, Jacov Malik, walked out of the Security Council in protest. Malik remained absent for several months, and as such the Soviet Union failed to exercise its veto power to block United Nations Security Council Resolution 82, which condemned North Korea at the beginning of the Korean War; on behalf of the U.S., Gross voted in favor of the resolution. In fall 1950, Warren Austin returned from his leave of absence, and Gross continued to serve as Austin's deputy until 1953.

In 1953, Gross joined the law firm of Curtis, Mallet-Prevost, Colt & Mosle; he would remain associated with the firm for the rest of his life. During the Army–McCarthy hearings, Gross represented Ralph Bunche, who was called before the committee, and Dag Hammarskjöld, who was threatened with being called before the committee. Beginning in 1959, Gross assisted the Tibetan government in exile and its leader the Fourteenth Dalai Lama as a lobbyist representing Tibet for the debate and vote about Tibet in the fall 1959 session of the United Nations. He advised on preparation of a Tibetan constitution. He authored "Tibetans Plan for Tomorrow" in Foreign Affairs, October 1960. Gross achieved notoriety as a lawyer later his career when in the 1960s he brought a suit in the World Court challenging South Africa's policy of apartheid.

Gross was also active in the international affairs activities of the ecumenical movement. He was a member of the Commission of the Churches on International Affairs of the World Council of Churches (CCIA/WCC) and he chaired the Department of International Affairs of the National Council of Churches of Christ in the USA (DIA/NCCCUSA) from 1954 to 1958. In that capacity he also chaired the NCCCUSA's Fifth World Order Study Conference on the Churches and World Order, in Cleveland, Ohio, 18–21 November 1958.

Gross died on May 2, 1999, at his home in New York City. He was 92 years old.

== Sources ==
- Michael T. Kaufman, "Ernest Gross, a Key Diplomat During Cold War, Dies at 92", New York Times, May 4, 1999

Legal offices
Preceded by Charles H. Fahy	Legal Adviser of the Department of State; August 16, 1947 – March 3, 1949	Succeeded by Adrian S. Fisher
Government offices
Preceded by Dean Acheson	Assistant Secretary of State for Legislative Affairs; March 4, 1949 – October 13, 1949	Succeeded by Jack K. McFall
