= Julia Frifield =

American federal government official

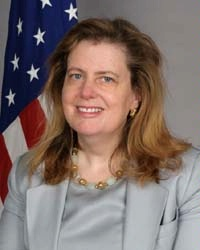

30th Assistant Secretary of State for Legislative Affairs
- In office October 21, 2013 – January 20, 2017
- President: Barack Obama
- Preceded by: David S. Adams
- Succeeded by: Mary Kirtley Waters

Personal details
- Born: 1962 (age 63–64)
- Education: Smith College (BA); Cambridge University (MA)

Julia Frifield (born 1962) is an American government official who previously served as Assistant Secretary of State for Legislative Affairs from October 21, 2013, to January 20, 2017.

Prior to serving as Assistant Secretary of State, she was Chief of Staff for longtime U.S. Senator Barbara Mikulski.

Government offices
| Preceded by David Adams | Assistant Secretary of State for Legislative Affairs; October 21, 2013 – January 20, 2017 | Succeeded by Mary Kirtley Waters |
