= Mary Waters (nurse) =

Mary Waters was a native of Dublin who was a prominent nurse in the United States forces during the American Revolutionary War. She migrated to Philadelphia in 1766. She worked closely with Benjamin Rush and in 1791 he wrote notes for a planned biography of her. He praised her for her professionalism and her deference to doctors.

== Sources ==
- Catholic history article on Waters
- Kerber, Linda K. Women of the Republic: Intellect and Ideology in Revolutionary America. Chapel Hill: University of North Carolina Press, 1980. p. 74.
