= Assistant Secretary of State for Legislative Affairs =

United States Assistant Secretary of State for Legislative Affairs
- Seal of the United States Department of State

- Flag of an assistant secretary of state

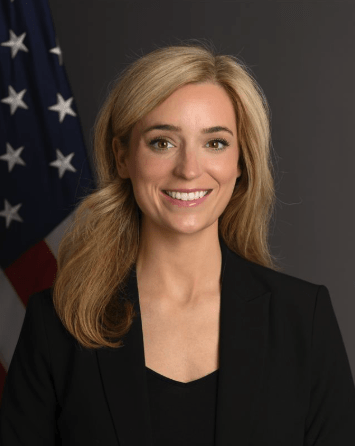
- Incumbent; Katherine Bowles since September 1, 2026
- Reports to: The secretary of state
- Nominator: The president of the United States
- Inaugural holder: Dean Acheson
- Formation: 1944
- Website: Official Website

The assistant secretary of state for legislative affairs is the head of the Bureau of Legislative Affairs within the United States Department of State.

== List of assistant secretaries of state for legislative affairs ==
#	Name	Assumed office	Left office	President served under
1	Dean Acheson	December 20, 1944	August 15, 1945	Franklin D. Roosevelt
2	Ernest A. Gross	March 4, 1949	October 13, 1949	Harry S. Truman
3	Jack K. McFall	October 15, 1949	September 9, 1952	Harry S. Truman
4	Thruston Ballard Morton	January 30, 1953	February 29, 1956	Dwight D. Eisenhower
5	Robert C. Hill	March 9, 1956	June 26, 1957	Dwight D. Eisenhower
6	William B. Macomber Jr.	October 21, 1957	February 27, 1961	Dwight D. Eisenhower
7	Brooks Hays	February 28, 1961	December 3, 1961	John F. Kennedy
8	Fred Dutton	December 4, 1961	July 27, 1964	John F. Kennedy and Lyndon B. Johnson
9	Douglas MacArthur II	March 14, 1965	March 6, 1967	Lyndon B. Johnson
10	William B. Macomber Jr.	March 7, 1967	October 2, 1969	Lyndon B. Johnson
11	David Manker Abshire	April 20, 1970	January 8, 1973	Richard Nixon
12	Marshall Wright	May 29, 1973	February 2, 1974	Richard Nixon
13	A. Linwood Holton	February 28, 1974	January 31, 1975	Richard Nixon and Gerald Ford
14	Robert J. McCloskey	February 21, 1975	September 10, 1976	Gerald Ford
15	Douglas J. Bennet	March 18, 1977	August 2, 1979	Jimmy Carter
16	J. Brian Atwood	August 3, 1979	January 14, 1981	Jimmy Carter
17	Richard M. Fairbanks	March 6, 1981	January 26, 1982	Ronald Reagan
18	Powell A. Moore	February 8, 1982	August 5, 1983	Ronald Reagan
19	W. Tapley Bennett Jr.	November 17, 1983	January 4, 1985	Ronald Reagan
20	William L. Ball	April 2, 1985	February 28, 1986	Ronald Reagan
21	J. Edward Fox	June 18, 1986	February 21, 1989	Ronald Reagan
22	Janet G. Mullins	March 2, 1989	August 23, 1992	George H. W. Bush
23	Wendy Sherman	May 12, 1993	March 29, 1996	Bill Clinton
24	Barbara Mills Larkin	July 19, 1996	January 19, 2001	Bill Clinton
25	Paul Vincent Kelly	June 1, 2001	January 24, 2005	George W. Bush
26	Jeffrey Bergner	November 9, 2005	June 27, 2008	George W. Bush
27	Matthew A. Reynolds	October 7, 2008	January 20, 2009	George W. Bush
28	Richard Verma	April 6, 2009	March 14, 2011	Barack Obama
-	Joseph Macmanus (acting)	March 14, 2011	August 4, 2011	Barack Obama
29	David S. Adams	August 4, 2011	June 18, 2013	Barack Obama
30	Julia Frifield	October 21, 2013	January 20, 2017	Barack Obama
-	Joseph Macmanus (acting)	January 20, 2017	December 20, 2017	Donald Trump
31	Mary Kirtley Waters	December 20, 2017	August 31, 2018	Donald Trump
32	Mary Elizabeth Taylor	October 1, 2018	July 3, 2020	Donald Trump
-	Ryan M. Kaldahl (acting)	July 3, 2020	January 20, 2021	Donald Trump
-	Naz Durakoğlu (acting)	January 20, 2021	July 22, 2022	Joe Biden
33	Naz Durakoğlu	July 22, 2022	December 20, 2024	Joe Biden
-	Philip Laidlaw (acting)	December 20, 2024	February 1, 2025	Joe Biden; Donald Trump
-	Paul D. Guaglianone (acting)	February 1, 2025	June 23, 2026	Donald Trump
-	Kaitlyn Wolfe (acting)	June 23, 2026	September 1, 2026	Donald Trump
34	Katherine Bowles	September 1, 2026	Present	Donald Trump
