= Uplifting Service =

2012 book

Uplifting Service: The Proven Path to Delighting Your Customers, Colleagues, and Everyone Else You Meet
- Author: Ron Kaufman
- Language: English
- Genre: Business, Management
- Publisher: Evolve Publishing
- Publication date: 2012
- Pages: 384
- ISBN: 978-0984762507

Uplifting Service: The Proven Path to Delighting Your Customers, Colleagues, and Everyone Else You Meet is a 2012 book by Ron Kaufman. It was listed among USA Today and The New York Times Best Sellers in 2012. The book addresses the concept of building and maintaining a service-oriented culture within organizations and provides a framework for improving service standards across various settings, including businesses, government entities, and community organizations.

== Summary ==
Uplifting Service is about challenges organizations face in delivering service excellence and argues that organizations in all sectors often lack the structured guidance and practices seen in fields such as aviation or medicine. Kaufman contends that service responsibilities are frequently separated into individual departments without comprehensive frameworks to bind them together in a shared culture or commitment to consistently add new value by improving internal and external service. The book suggests that adopting a cohesive and actionable service model can improve customer experience and employee satisfaction. The book details Kaufman's approach to service culture transformation and offers a set of principles and tools aimed at enhancing service delivery within organizations. Through case studies and examples, it outlines methods for fostering sustainable service improvements applicable in different industries and cultural settings.

== Reception ==
Upon release, Uplifting Service appeared on bestseller lists including The New York Times.

Thomas Moran, Director of Customer and Partner Experience at Microsoft Operations, described Kaufman's book as identifying a significant societal issue and offering a strategy for fostering positive change. Moran stated that the book provides "a clear path to a sustainable competitive advantage" for businesses and anticipates it will create "a legendary shift."

Stephen M. R. Covey and Greg Link, authors of Smart Trust, noted that Uplifting Service serves as a timely guide for today's "troubled times." They emphasized that Kaufman's approach offers a blueprint for enhancing customer satisfaction, a crucial skill in an era where social media amplifies customer voices.

Marshall Goldsmith, author of What Got You Here Won't Get You There, encouraged readers to "apply the steps" outlined in the book to see organizational culture transform. He praised Kaufman for "unlocking the mystery of service" and described the book as an invitation to "a magnificent journey into a new world."
