= Naz Durakoğlu =

American government official

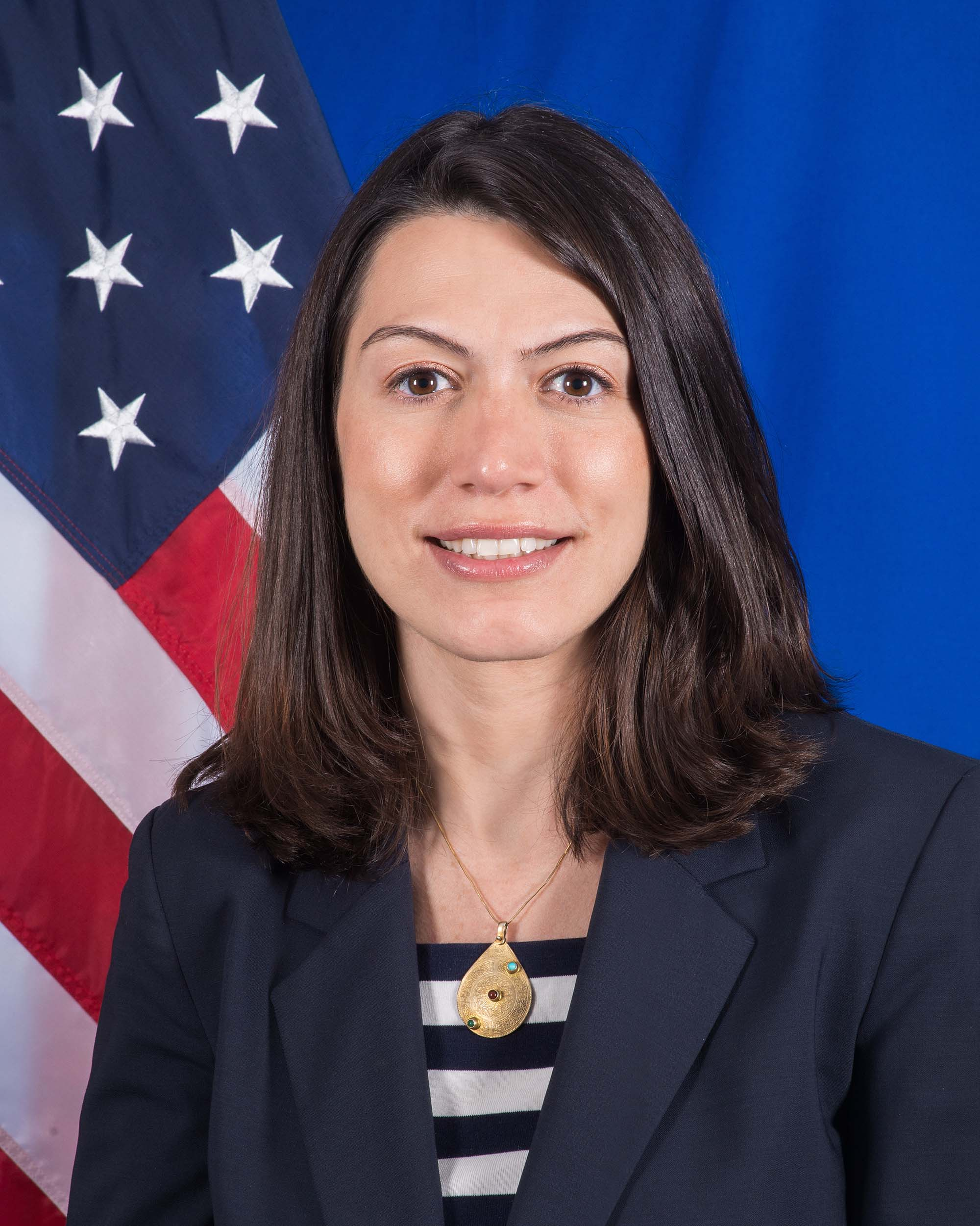

33rd Assistant Secretary of State for Legislative Affairs
- In office January 20, 2021; Acting: January 20, 2021 – July 22, 2022 – December 20, 2024
- President: Joe Biden
- Preceded by: Mary Elizabeth Taylor
- Succeeded by: Katherine Bowles

Personal details
- Born: June 13, 1985 (age 41)
- Education: Rutgers University, New Brunswick (BA); Naval War College (MA)

Naz Durakoğlu (born June 13, 1985) is a Turkish-American foreign policy and national security advisor who had served assistant secretary of state for legislative affairs.

== Early life and education ==
Durakoğlu is first generation Turkish-American. She earned a bachelor of arts degree in psychology and philosophy from Rutgers University and a master of arts degree in national security and strategic studies from the Naval War College.

== Career ==
From 2007 to 2008, Durakoğlu worked on the national advance staff of the Hillary Clinton 2008 presidential primary campaign. She then worked as deputy finance director for Michael McMahon's 2008 campaign for New York's 13th congressional district. From 2009 to 2011, she served as McMahon's legislative assistant. Also in 2011, she served as a legislative assistant for Congressman Anthony Weiner. From 2011 to 2015, she was the legislative director for Congressman Bill Keating. From 2013 to 2015, she was the staff director for the United States House Foreign Affairs Subcommittee on Europe, Energy, the Environment and Emerging Threats. From 2015 to 2017, she served as a senior advisor in the Bureau of European and Eurasian Affairs. She later worked for the Digital Forensic Research Lab, a program founded in 2016 as a part of the Atlantic Council. From 2017 to 2021, she served as national security advisor for Senator Jeanne Shaheen. In January 2021, she was selected to serve as deputy assistant secretary of state for legislative affairs and acting secretary before being appointed permanently to the position on July 22, 2022.

== Personal life ==
Durakoğlu speaks Turkish.
