= Seth Anziska =

Seth Anziska (born 1982–1983) is the Mohamed S. Farsi-Lindenbaum Associate Professor of Jewish-Muslim Relations at University College London. He is the author of Preventing Palestine: A Political History from Camp David to Oslo. His research and teaching focuses on contemporary Arab and Jewish politics.

== Early life and education ==
Anziska was raised in a Zionist family, and had a modern Orthodox upbringing "from day school to yeshiva and beyond." At age 18 in 2001 he spent a gap year at a yeshiva in Gush Etzion. The kibbutz, on the West Bank, had been lost to Jordan in 1948 and won back by Israel in 1967. 2001 was during the Second Intifada, during which Anziska felt that the Palestinians were living under an oppressive system. This was a turning point for Anziska, and led him to prolonged investigation of Israeli-Palestinian affairs, particularly of the 1978 Camp David Accords and the 1993 Oslo Accords.

He received a PhD in International and Global History with distinction from Columbia University, his M.Phil. in Modern Middle Eastern Studies from St. Antony's College, Oxford, and his BA in history from Columbia University. He has held fellowships at the Dorothy and Lewis B. Cullman Center for Scholars and Writers at the New York Public Library, the Stellenbosch Institute for Advanced Study in South Africa, the Norwegian Nobel Institute in Oslo, New York University, and the American University of Beirut.

== Writings ==
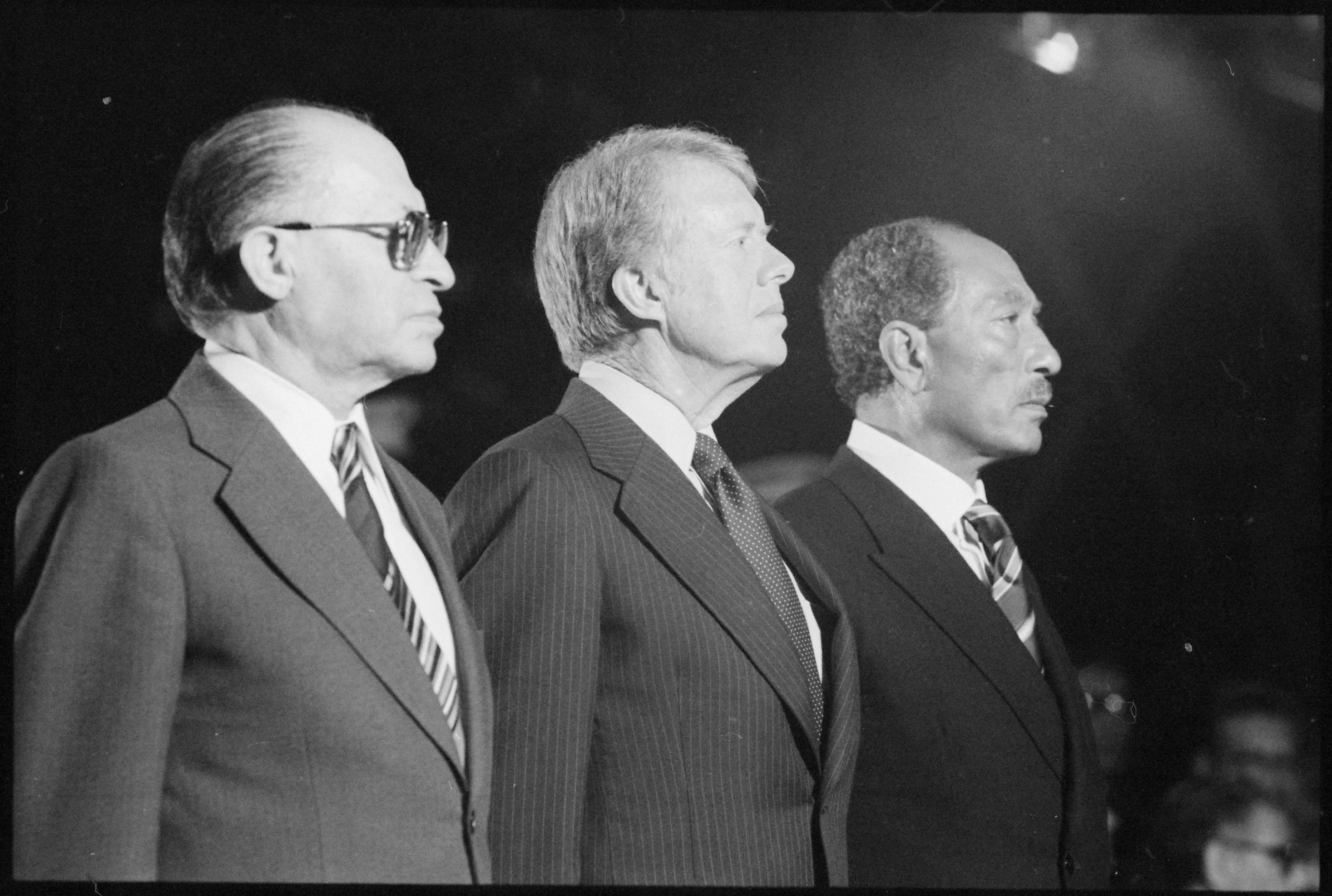
Close up of Menahem Begin, Jimmy Carter and Anwar Sadat at Camp David., 09-07-1978

Anziska views the Camp David Accords as helping to cause the prolonged and continuing stalemate between Palestine and Israel. He opines that Sadat prioritized the return of the Sinai over any allegiance to other Arab nationalistic goals. Begin used the peace with Egypt to accelerate Israeli West Bank settlements, which has continued to the present. In 1977 there were 400 Israeli settlers in the West Bank; by 1992 there were 100,000. At Camp David, Begin introduced the concept of only limited self-rule, not the formation of a nation-state. Carter and Sadat opposed this formulation, but went along with it so that peace between Israel and Egypt could be secured. There was a strong connection between the autonomy plans of Camp David and Oslo with the latter drawing on the original plan. Anziska states that the plans were inadequate and "dismantled the political mechanisms needed for a just solution of the Palestinian Question." He argues that the influence of this early period was instrumental in the persistence of Palestinian statelessness. The damage done by promotion of autonomy over sovereignty and the expansion of the settlements could not be undone.

Anziska is critical of the American and Israeli roles in the Sabra and Shatila massacres. In 2012 he discovered evidence that the U.S. was unwittingly complicit in prolonging the slaughter in the camps by acquiescing to Sharon's claim of terrorists remaining. Anziska has published information that Israel and the Phalange "fomented violence against the Palestinians" as part of a political agenda to remake Lebanon's demographics.

Anziska condemns American support for Israeli actions in Gaza and Lebanon. He criticizes President Biden, and names high level officials and mid-level bureaucrats as being modern day merchants of death. "There are no adults left in the room" to consider the consequences of the violence. He states that they have nothing to offer but more violence.

He describes Israeli actions against Palestinians and Lebanese as a new chapter in warfare, one that presages grotesque innovations, pushing the limits of humanitarian law.

== Criticism of Anziska ==
Joel Singer was the legal aide to the Israeli side of the two negotiations. He describes Anziska's analysis of both Accords as an "alternate reality" and a "PLO apologetic". He claims that Anziska "confuses cause and effect". He maintains that Rabin intended Oslo to be a transition to a separate state. Yair Hirschfeld was an architect of the Oslo Accords. In a lengthy rebuttal, he argues that's Anziska's book on the accords "justifies Palestinian negativism, distorts history, and perpetuates a narrative that can only lead to more disappointment and suffering for Palestinians and Israelis alike."
