= David S. Adams (State Department) =

American politician

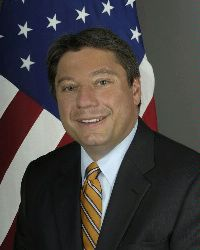

29th Assistant Secretary of State for Legislative Affairs
- In office August 4, 2011 – June 18, 2013
- President: Barack Obama
- Preceded by: Richard Verma
- Succeeded by: Julia Frifield

Personal details
- Born: 1961 (age 64–65)
- Education: University of Connecticut (BA); American University (MA); Loyola University Maryland (MBA)

David S. Adams (born 1961) was the Assistant Secretary of State for Legislative Affairs of the United States Department of State. He was appointed to this position in August 2011. Previously he was Deputy Assistant Secretary of State for House Affairs. Before this he served for 24 years on the staff of Gary L. Ackerman a member of the United States House.

Adams has a BA in political science from the University of Connecticut, an MA in comparative politics from American University and an MBA from Loyola University Maryland.

Government offices
Preceded by Richard Verma	Assistant Secretary of State for Legislative Affairs; August 4, 2011 – June 18, 2013	Succeeded by Julia Frifield
