= Mary Kirtley Waters =

American lawyer (born 1958)

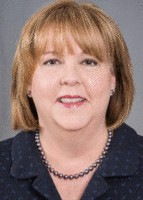
- UNIC Washington Director
- Born: 1958 (age 67–68)
- Education: University of Illinois (BA); Antonin Scalia Law School (JD)
- Occupation: Director, UN Information Centre

Mary Kirtley Waters

31st Assistant Secretary of State for Legislative Affairs
- In office December 20, 2017 – August 31, 2018
- Preceded by: Julia Frifield
- Succeeded by: Mary Elizabeth Taylor

Personal details
- Born: 1958 (age 67–68)

Mary Kirtley Waters (born 1958) was the Director of the United Nations Information Centre in Washington, D.C. She served as Assistant Secretary of State for Legislative Affairs at the U.S. Department of State from 2017 to 2018 in the first Trump Administration.

Waters was a cabinet confirmation team leader for the first presidential transition of Donald Trump. She has served as president of the North American Millers' Association, vice president for corporate relations with the Federal Agricultural Mortgage Corporation, and assistant secretary for congressional relations at the United States Department of Agriculture.

She spent 15 years in the private sector as senior director and legislative counsel at ConAgra.

Government offices
Preceded by Julia Frifield	Assistant Secretary of State for Legislative Affairs; December 20, 2017 – August 31, 2018	Succeeded by Mary Elizabeth Taylor
