= Jack Lew =

American attorney (born 1955)

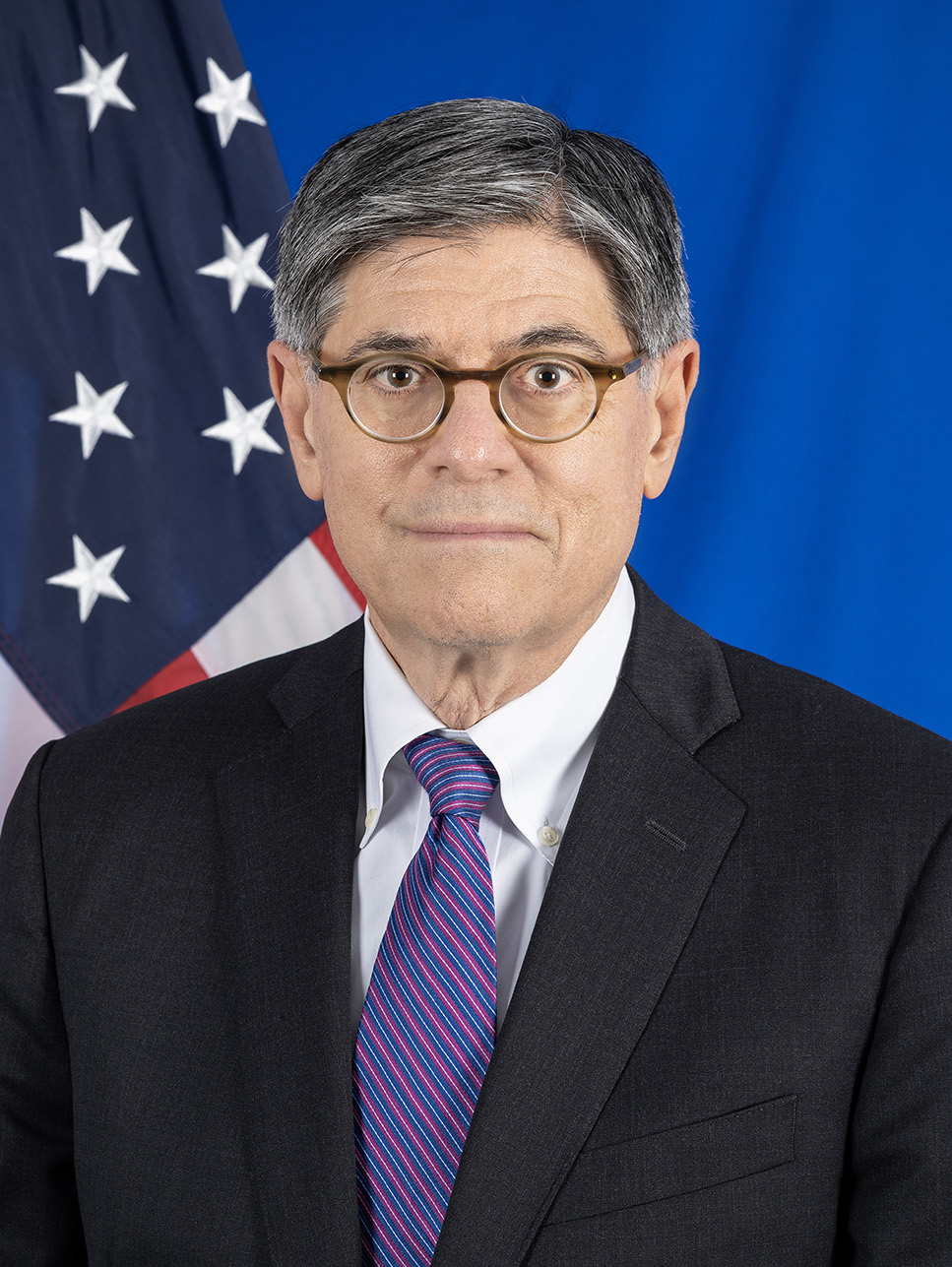
- Official portrait, 2023

United States Ambassador to Israel
- In office November 5, 2023 – January 20, 2025
- President: Joe Biden
- Preceded by: Thomas R. Nides
- Succeeded by: Mike Huckabee

76th United States Secretary of the Treasury
- In office February 28, 2013 – January 20, 2017
- President: Barack Obama
- Deputy: Neal S. Wolin; Mary J. Miller (acting); Sarah Bloom Raskin
- Preceded by: Timothy Geithner
- Succeeded by: Steven Mnuchin

25th White House Chief of Staff
- In office January 27, 2012 – January 20, 2013
- President: Barack Obama
- Preceded by: Bill Daley
- Succeeded by: Denis McDonough

32nd and 38th Director of the Office of Management and Budget
- In office November 18, 2010 – January 27, 2012
- President: Barack Obama
- Deputy: Jeffrey Liebman (acting); Heather Higginbottom
- Preceded by: Jeff Zients (acting)
- Succeeded by: Jeff Zients (acting)
- In office May 21, 1998 – January 19, 2001; Acting: May 21, 1998 – July 31, 1998
- President: Bill Clinton
- Deputy: Joshua Gotbaum (acting); Sylvia Mathews Burwell
- Preceded by: Franklin Raines
- Succeeded by: Mitch Daniels

1st Deputy Secretary of State for Management and Resources
- In office January 28, 2009 – November 18, 2010
- President: Barack Obama
- Preceded by: Position established
- Succeeded by: Thomas R. Nides

Deputy Director of the Office of Management and Budget
- In office August 1995 – July 31, 1998
- President: Bill Clinton
- Preceded by: John Koskinen
- Succeeded by: Sylvia Mathews Burwell

Personal details
- Born: Jacob Joseph Lew; August 29, 1955 (age 71) New York City, New York, U.S.
- Party: Democratic
- Spouse: Ruth Schwartz
- Children: 2
- Education: Carleton College (attended); Harvard University (BA); Georgetown University (JD)
- Lew's voice Lew at the House Ways and Means Committee on the FY2015 federal budget. Recorded March 6, 2014

Jacob Joseph Lew (born August 29, 1955) is an American attorney and diplomat who served as the 28th United States ambassador to Israel from 2023 to 2025. He was the 76th United States secretary of the treasury from 2013 to 2017. A member of the Democratic Party, he also served as the 25th White House chief of staff from 2012 to 2013 and as director of the Office of Management and Budget in both the Clinton administration and Obama administration.

During the Obama administration, Lew served as the first deputy secretary of state for management and resources from 2009 to 2010, before returning to his former post of OMB Director from 2010 to 2012. He then served as chief of staff for the remainder of President Barack Obama’s first term from 2012 to 2013.

On January 10, 2013, Lew was nominated to replace retiring Treasury Secretary Timothy Geithner, was confirmed by the Senate February 27, 2013, and then sworn in on the following day, serving until the conclusion of the Obama administration. Since 2017, he has been a managing partner at Lindsay Goldberg, a private equity firm headquartered in New York City. He is currently a visiting professor at the School of International and Public Affairs of Columbia University.

== Early life, education, and early career ==
Lew was born in New York City, the son of Ruth (née Turoff) and Irving Lew. His family is Jewish. He attended New York City public schools, graduating from Forest Hills High School. His father was a lawyer and rare book dealer who came to the United States from Poland as a child. Lew attended Carleton College in Minnesota for a year, where his faculty adviser was Paul Wellstone, who eventually represented Minnesota in the U.S. Senate. He graduated from Harvard College in 1978 and the Georgetown University Law Center in 1983.

He worked as an aide to Rep. Joe Moakley (D-Mass.) from 1974 to 1975. In 1979, he was a senior policy adviser to House Speaker Tip O'Neill. Under O'Neill he served at the House Democratic Steering and Policy Committee as Assistant Director and then Executive Director, and was responsible for work on domestic and economic issues including Social Security, Medicare, budget, tax, trade, appropriations, and energy issues.

Lew practiced as an attorney for five years as a partner at Van Ness Feldman and Curtis. His practice dealt primarily with electric power generation. He has also worked as Executive Director of the Center for Middle East Research, Issues Director for the Democratic National Committee's Campaign 88, and Deputy Director of the Office of Program Analysis in the city of Boston's Office of Management and Budget.

== Clinton administration ==
From February 1993 to 1994, Lew served as Special Assistant to the President under Bill Clinton. Lew was responsible for policy development and the drafting of the national service initiative (AmeriCorps) and health care reform legislation.

Lew left the White House in October 1994 to work as OMB's Executive Associate Director and Associate Director for Legislative Affairs. From August 1995 until July 1998, Lew served as Deputy Director of OMB. There, Lew was chief operating officer responsible for day-to-day management of a staff of 500. He had crosscutting responsibilities to coordinate Clinton administration efforts on budget and appropriations matters. He frequently served as a member of the Administration negotiating team, including regarding the Balanced Budget Act of 1997.

President Clinton nominated Lew to be director of the OMB, and his nomination was confirmed by the United States Senate on July 31, 1998. He served in that capacity until the end of the Clinton administration in January 2001. As OMB director, Lew had the lead responsibility for the Clinton Administration's policies on budget, management, and appropriations issues. As a member of the Cabinet and senior member of the economic team, he advised the president on a broad range of domestic and international policies. He represented the Administration in budget negotiations with Congress and served as a member of the National Security Council.

== Between Clinton and Obama tenures ==
After leaving public office in the Clinton administration, Lew served as the executive vice president for operations at New York University and was a clinical professor of public administration at NYU's Wagner School of Public Service. While at NYU, Lew aided the university in ending graduate students' collective bargaining rights. The Obama administration has maintained that Lew supports workers' union rights. According to a 2004 report in NYU's student newspaper, the Washington Square News, Lew was paid $840,339 during the 2002–2003 academic year. In addition, the university forgave several hundred thousand dollars in mortgage loans it made to Lew. In 2004, President George W. Bush appointed Lew as a member of the board of directors of the Corporation for National and Community Service, a position he held until 2008.

In June 2006, Lew was named chief operating officer of Citigroup's Alternative Investments unit, a proprietary trading group. The unit he oversaw invested in a hedge fund "that bet on the housing market to collapse." During his work at Citigroup, Lew had invested heavily in funds in Ugland House while he worked as an investment banker at Citigroup during the 2008 financial crisis. Lew also had oversight of Citigroup subsidiaries in countries including, Bermuda, the Cayman Islands, and Hong Kong; and during his time at Citigroup, Citigroup subsidiaries in the Cayman Islands increased to 113.

Lew co-chaired the Advisory Board for City Year New York. He is a member of the Council on Foreign Relations, the Brookings Institution's Hamilton Project Advisory Board, and the National Academy of Social Insurance. Lew is also a member of the bar in Massachusetts and the District of Columbia.

== Obama administration ==
=== Deputy Secretary of State ===
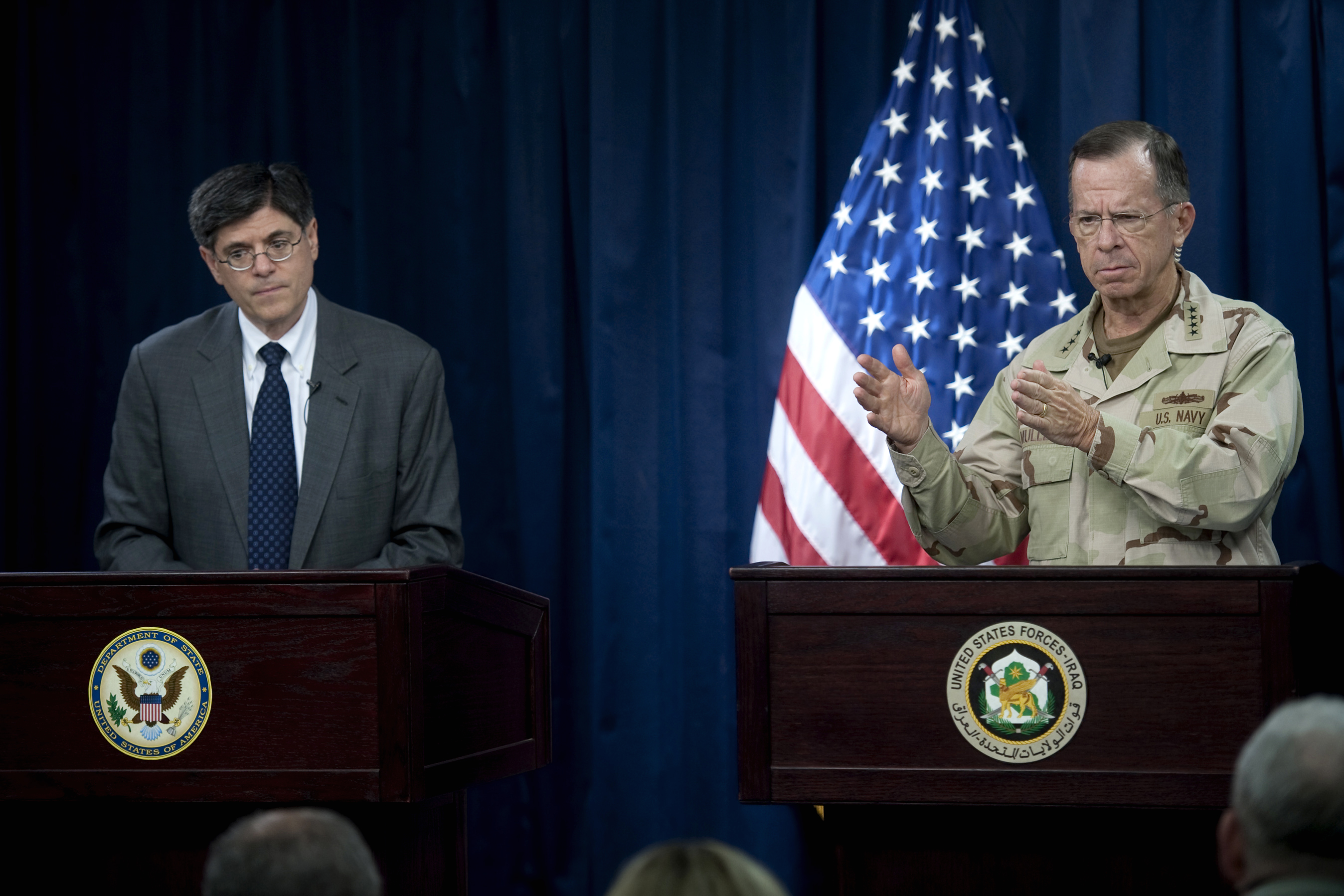
Lew with former Chair of the Joint Chiefs Admiral Mike Mullen at the Combined Press Information Center in Baghdad, July 27, 2010.

As Deputy Secretary of State for Management and Resources, Lew was the State Department's chief operating officer and was primarily responsible for resource issues, while James Steinberg, who also served as Deputy Secretary of State during that period, was responsible for policy. Lew was co-leader of the State Department's Quadrennial Diplomacy and Development Review.

=== Budget director ===
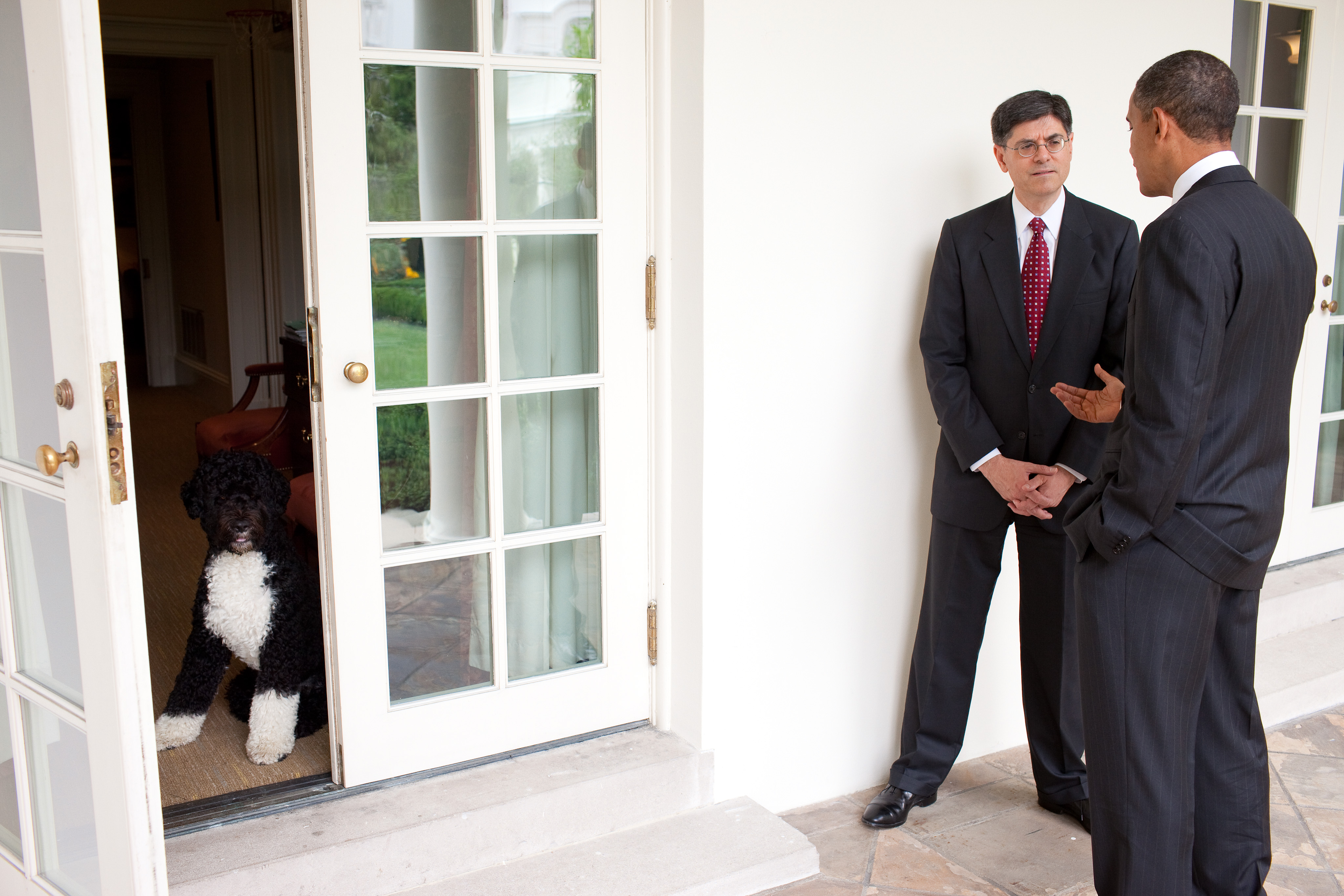
Lew with President Barack Obama on July 13, 2010

On July 13, 2010, the White House announced that Lew had been chosen to replace Peter Orszag as director of the Office of Management and Budget (OMB), subject to Senate confirmation. During confirmation hearings in the Senate, he was asked by Senator Bernie Sanders (I-VT) whether deregulation of Wall Street had contributed significantly to the 2008 financial crisis, Lew told the panel that while "the problems in the financial industry preceded deregulation," he didn't "personally know the extent to which deregulation drove it, but I don't believe that deregulation was the proximate cause."

On November 18, 2010, Lew was confirmed in the Senate by voice vote.

The $3.7 trillion 2011 budget President Obama unveiled the administration included estimated reductions to federal spending deficits by $1.1 trillion over the next decade if adopted and economic assumptions were fully achieved. Two-thirds of that estimated reduction would come from spending cuts through a five-year freeze in discretionary spending first announced in Obama's 2011 State of the Union address, as well as savings to mandatory programs such as Medicare and lower interest payments on the debt that would result from the lower spending. Tax increases are responsible for the other third of the reduction, including a cap on itemized reductions for wealthier taxpayers and the elimination of tax breaks for oil and gas companies. Economist and former financial fraud investigator William K. Black warned that the OMB budget statement prepared under Lew's direction was "an ode to austerity," and that austerity would force the U.S. economy back into recession.

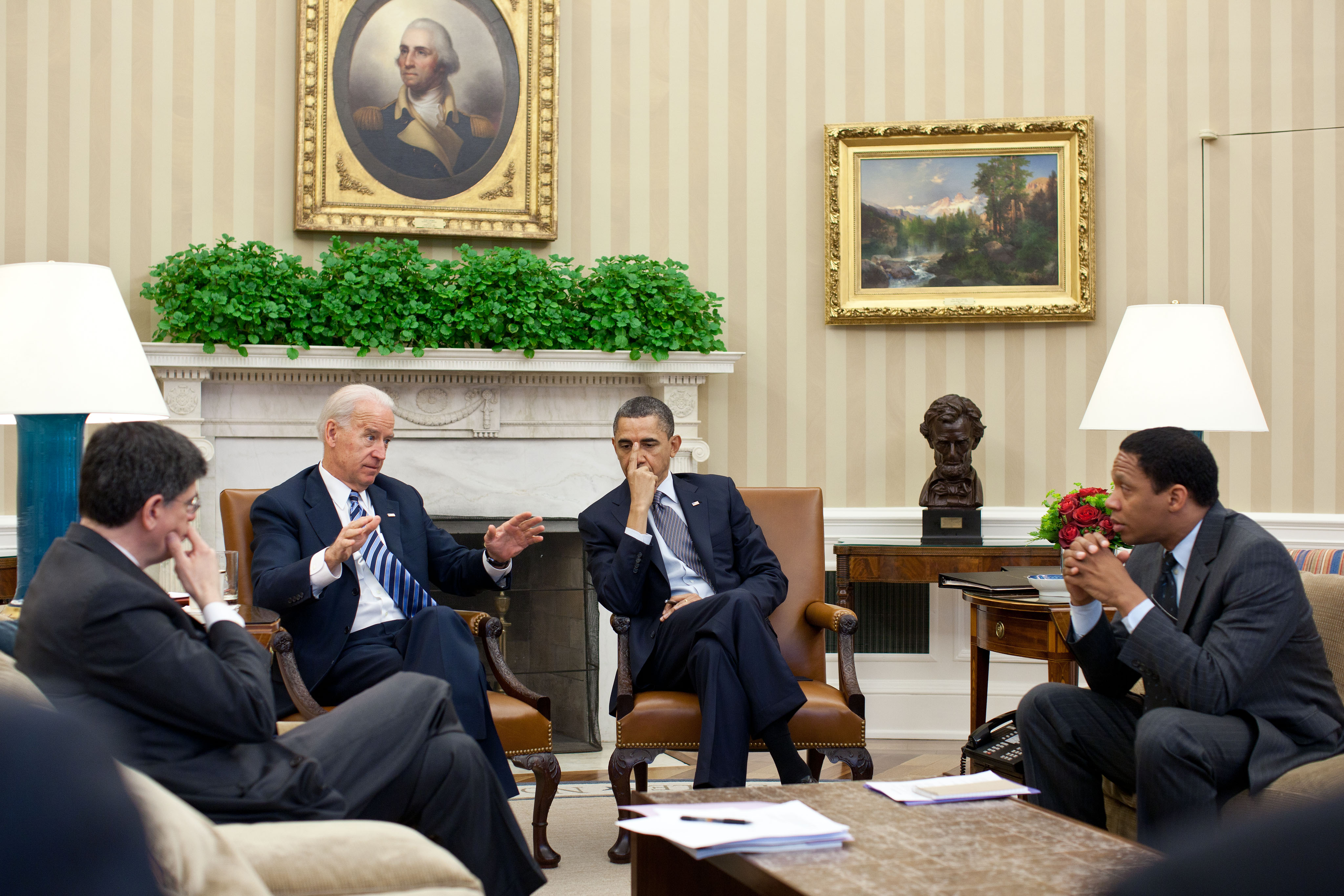
Lew meeting with President Barack Obama, Vice President Joe Biden and the Legislative Affairs Director Rob Nabors, April 5, 2011

In an op-ed in the Huffington Post, Lew cited top Administration priorities to achieve deficit reduction; including: $400 billion in savings from non-security discretionary spending freezes, $78 billion in cuts to the Department of Defense, returning to the Clinton-era tax rates for the top 2% of income earners, and lowering the corporate tax from 35% to 25%.

=== Chief of Staff ===
On January 9, 2012, President Obama announced that Lew would replace William M. Daley as White House Chief of Staff. Lew's nomination was followed with criticism after renewed reports that he received over $900,000 in bonuses while working at Citigroup, which had been rescued with $45 billion from the Troubled Asset Relief Program (TARP) after losing $27.7 billion, or 90% of its value.

During his tenure as chief of staff, Lew was seen as a supporter and top negotiator for a "grand bargain" deal between President Obama and House Speaker John Boehner, to avoid "fiscal cliff" sequester cuts and tax increases.

=== Secretary of the Treasury ===
Lew's signature

Lew's currency signature

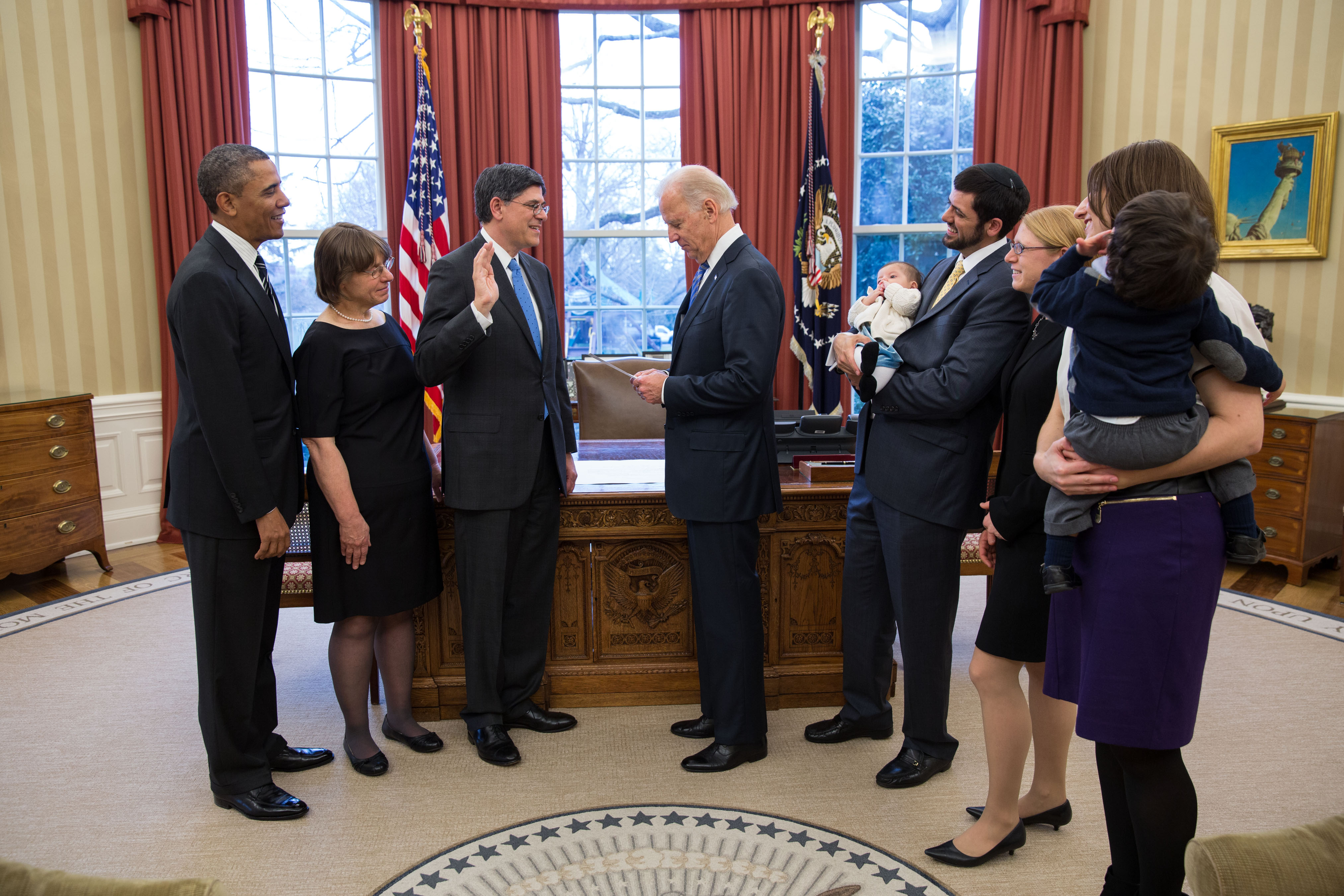
Lew is sworn as Secretary of the Treasury by Vice President Joe Biden in the Oval Office of the White House, February 28, 2013.

On January 10, 2013, President Obama nominated Lew for the position of Secretary of the Treasury. The nomination became the subject of some humorous commentary, due to Lew's unusual loopy signature, which would have appeared on all newly issued U.S. paper currency for the duration of his tenure; the signature generated enough media attention that Obama joked at a press conference that he had considered rescinding his nomination when he learned of it. Lew later adopted a more conventional signature for currency. The Senate Finance Committee held confirmation hearings for Lew on February 13, 2013. During his confirmation hearings before the United States Senate Committee on Finance, Republican senator Chuck Grassley expressed concern that Lew did not know what Ugland House was, though he had invested in it. Lew had invested heavily in funds in Ugland House, while he worked as an investment banker at Citigroup during the 2008 financial crisis. Lew had taken advantage of current tax law, and his financial allocation in the venture resulted in Lew taking roughly a 2.8% loss, a $1,582 decrease in his investment principal. The committee approved his nomination by a 19–5 vote on February 26, 2013, sending his nomination to the full Senate.

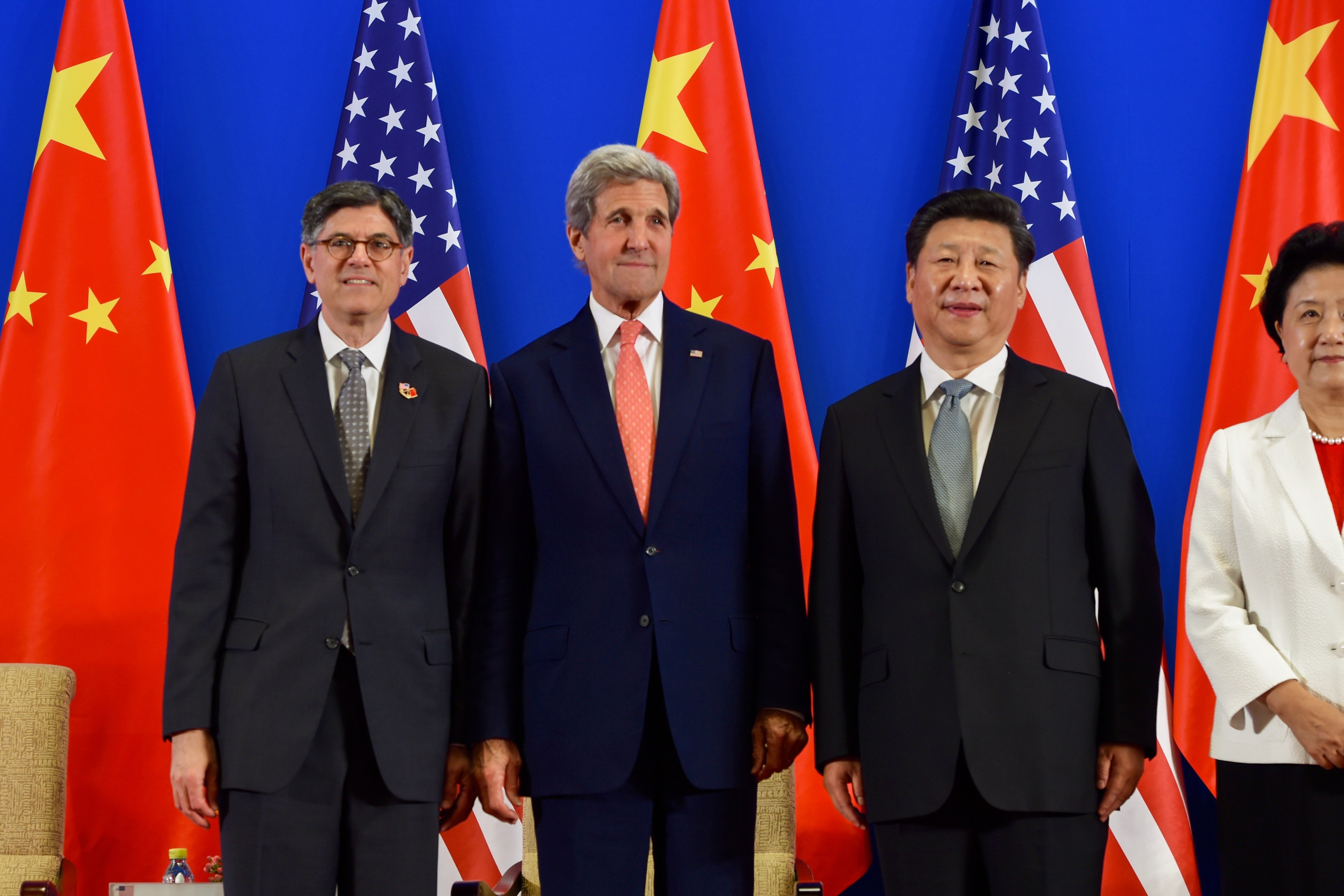
Lew and Foreign Minister John Kerry with Chinese President Xi Jinping, June 5, 2016

On February 27, 2013, the full Senate voted and approved Lew for Secretary of the Treasury by a 71–26 vote. He was sworn into office on February 28, 2013.

In December 2013, Lew said that the government might run out of cash to pay the country's bills by late February or early March 2014. That set up yet another showdown in Congress over raising or suspending the debt limit, a statutory limit on the total amount of United States borrowing, early in the year. "The creditworthiness of the United States is an essential underpinning of our strength as a nation; it is not a bargaining chip to be used for partisan political ends," Mr. Lew said in the letter. "Increasing the debt limit does not authorize new spending commitments. It simply allows the government to pay for expenditures Congress has already approved."

In May 2014, Lew received an Honorary Doctorate of Humane Letters from Georgetown University, and spoke at the first commencement ceremony of the McCourt School of Public Policy.

In 2016, a fictionalized version of Lew appeared in season 2 episode 2 and episode 11 in the series Mr. Robot.

== Biden administration ==
=== Ambassador to Israel ===
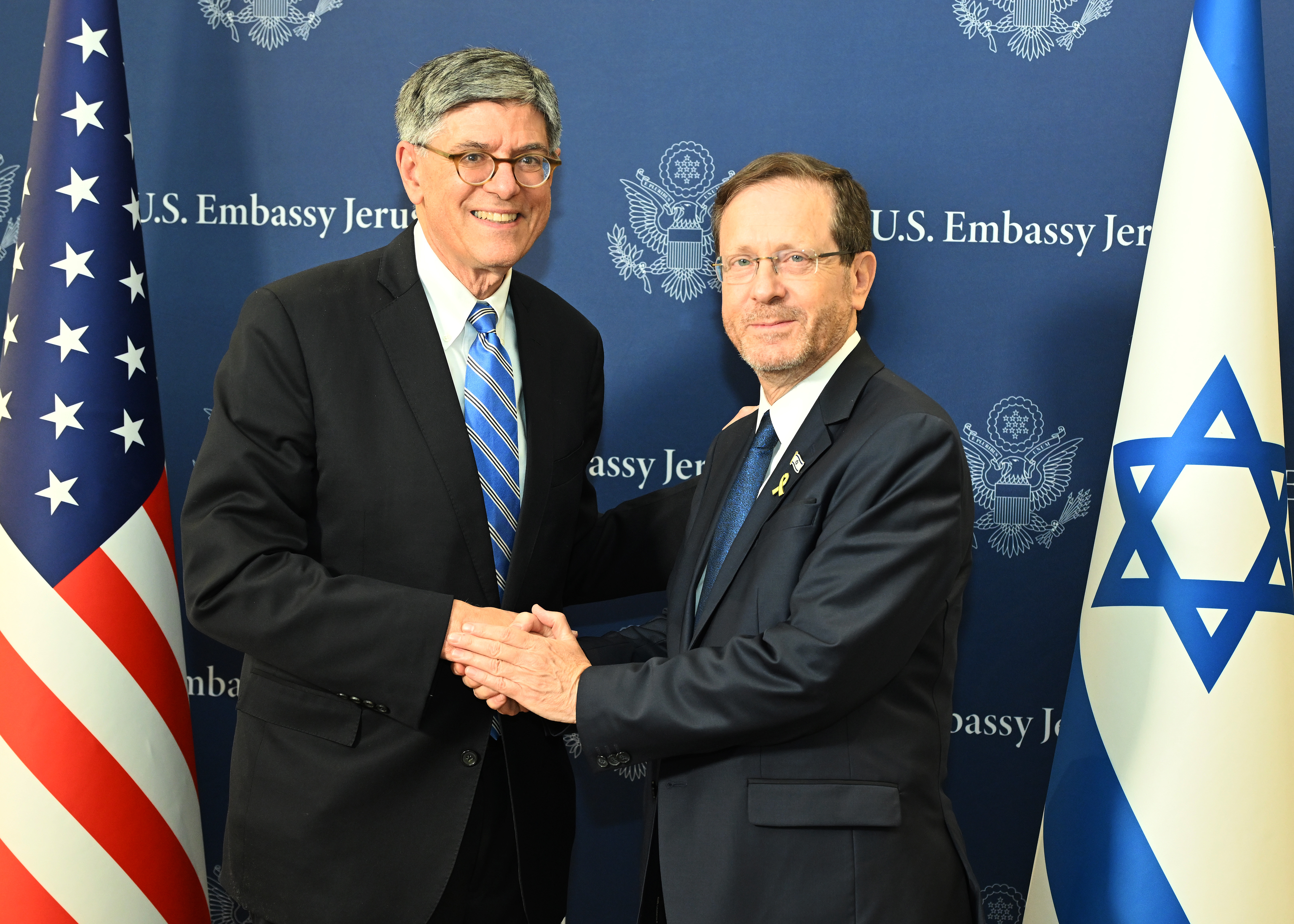
Jack Lew and Israeli president Isaac Herzog at the U.S. Embassy in Jerusalem on July 3, 2024

On September 5, 2023, President Biden nominated Lew as the U.S. ambassador to Israel. A hearing on his nomination took place before the Senate Foreign Relations Committee on October 18, 2023. Lew's confirmation coincided with Congress's response to the October 7 attacks and the ensuing war in Gaza. Although Biden had nominated Lew before the war began, the urgency surrounding his confirmation heightened as hostilities between Israel and Gaza intensified. While Republicans recognized the necessity of a Senate-confirmed ambassador, they opposed Lew, expressing concerns about his support for and role in implementing the multinational nuclear pact with Iran during the Obama years. They argued that this made him an unreliable interlocutor with Israel and questioned him about the deal during his confirmation hearing.

On October 25, 2023, the committee advanced his nomination by a 12–9 vote, largely along party lines; Senator Rand Paul of Kentucky was the only Republican to join all of the Democrats in advancing Lew's nomination to the full Senate. On October 31, 2023, the United States Senate invoked cloture on his nomination by a 53–44 vote. Later that day, Lew's nomination was confirmed by a 53–43 vote, with Republican senators Rand Paul and Lindsey Graham voting to confirm his nomination. Lew presented his credentials to Israeli President Isaac Herzog in Jerusalem on November 5, 2023.

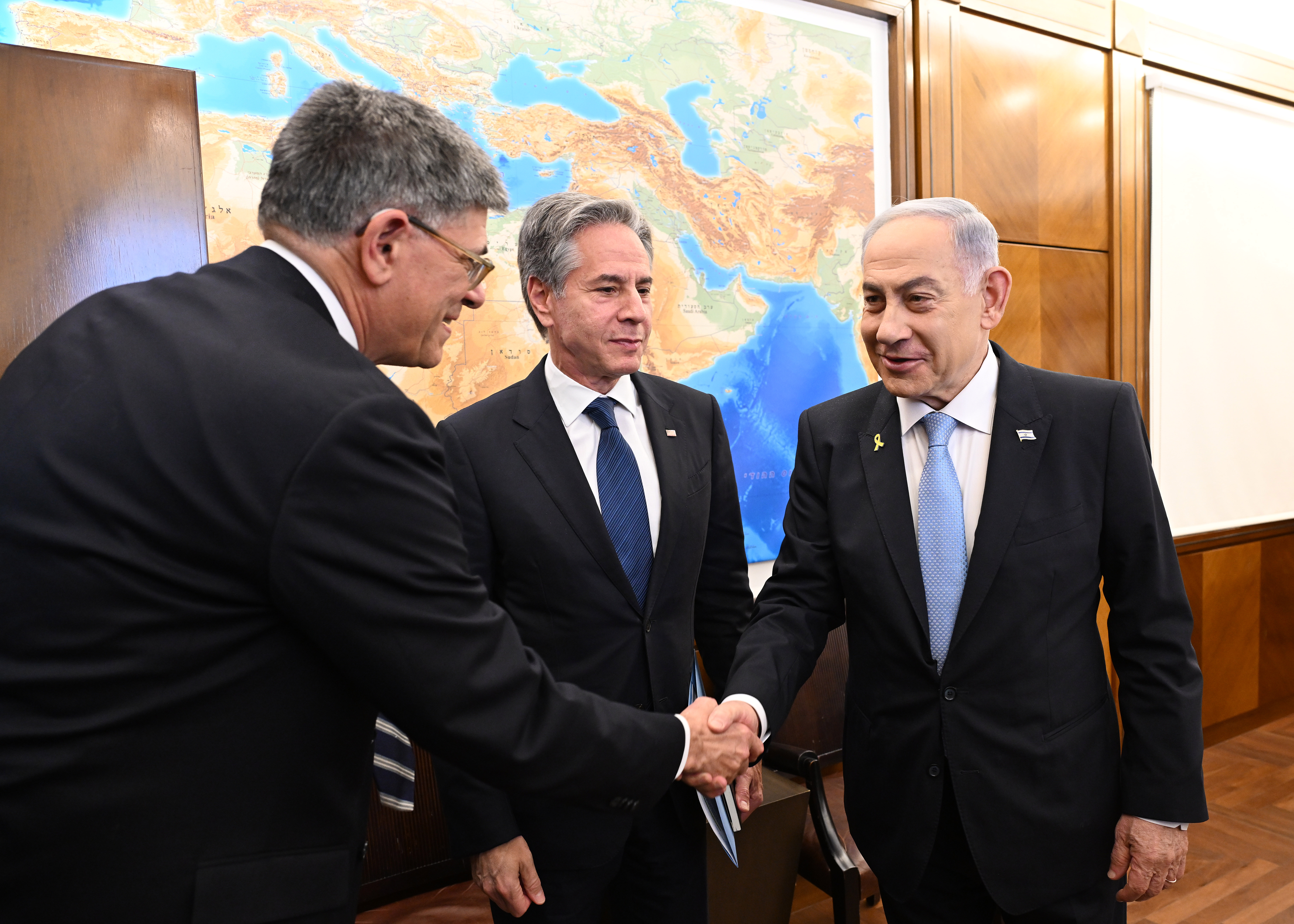
Lew, Israeli Prime Minister Benjamin Netanyahu and US Secretary of State Antony Blinken on August 19, 2024

In January 2024, Lew advocated the US State Department to approve sales of Boeing manufactured GBU-39 Small Diameter Bomb to Israel, asserting that the Israeli air force had a "decades-long proven track record" of minimizing civilian death. At the time of Lew's assessment, Amnesty International had already documented the use of GBU-39 bombs in an attack on civilians in May 2023, several months before October 7. Embassy officials in both Jerusalem and Washington said that concerns about civilian death tolls, including the targeting of Palestinian embassy employees and their families, were brought to Lew repeatedly. Such concerns were not mentioned in Lew's diplomatic cables. GBU-39 bombs were later identified in attacks on multiple dense civilian areas, including attacks on the Tel al-Sultan refugee camp, the Al-Sardi school in the Nuseirat refugee camp, and the Al-Tabaeen school which was also being used to house several thousand displaced Palestinians.

According to Reuters, in February 2024, Lew and his deputy Stephanie Hallett had blocked distribution of several cables written by USAID staffers which described the severity of the humanitarian conditions in Gaza. One cable, received three months after the start of the war, included descriptions of human bones left on roads, dead bodies abandoned in cars, and "catastrophic human needs, particularly for food and safe drinking water". Lew and Hallett prevented further distribution of these reports within the government as they believed they "lacked balance". Three former US officials told Reuters that "the descriptions were unusually graphic" and "would have commanded the attention" of senior officials if they had been distributed amongst those in the administration.

In March 2024, Lew sent a cable to Secretary of State Antony Blinken in which he stated that Israel was following International law and argued that the Israeli war cabinet should be trusted to facilitate aid shipments to Gaza. While acknowledging that "other parts of the Israeli government have tried to impede the movement of [humanitarian assistance]," he recommended continuing to provide military assistance to Israel based on his assessment "that Israel will not arbitrarily deny, restrict, or otherwise impede U.S. provided or supported" shipments of food and medicine. In the months prior to this, "Lew had been told repeatedly about instances of the Israelis blocking humanitarian assistance", and according to one official "had access to the same information as USAID leaders in Washington, in addition to evidence collected by the local State Department diplomats working in Jerusalem." Less than two months later, in May, USAID sent a 17-page memo to Blinken describing "instances of Israeli interference with aid efforts, including killing aid workers, razing agricultural structures, bombing ambulances and hospitals, sitting on supply depots and routinely turning away trucks full of food and medicine."

Lew at the Lockheed Martin Demo Center in Tel Aviv, Israel, July 18, 2024

On September 30, 2024, the group Veterans for Peace sent a letter addressed to the Department of Justice and U.S. District Attorney Matthew Graves requesting the "immediate empanelment of a grand jury" to investigate whether Blinken and Lew had committed "criminal violations of federal laws governing provision of military weapons and munitions aid to Israel", arguing that the two had enabled Israel's genocide in Gaza in violation of "the objectives of U.S. foreign policy against fomenting war, against allowing war crimes, and against the commission of human rights violations".

In December 2024, USAID's Famine Early Warning Systems Network (FEWS NET) issued a report which warned of growing famine in the North of Gaza resulting from Israel's blockade, and predicted that "non-trauma mortality levels will pass the Famine (IPC Phase 5) threshold between January and March 2025, with at least two to 15 people dying per day". Despite consistent warnings of imminent famine in from various humanitarian groups in the months prior, Lew criticized the report as "inaccurate" and "irresponsible" on the basis that it relied on "data which is outdated" regarding the civilian population of Gaza, citing lower estimates from both UNRWA and from the Israeli agency the Coordinatior of Government Activities in the Territories. FEWS NET subsequently retracted the report. Lew was criticized by human rights activist Alex de Waal in a piece for Haaretz and by former executive director of Human Right Watch, Kenneth Roth, for undermining the ability of FEWS NET to "make assessments about imminent famine that are untainted by political considerations"; Roth further stated "This quibbling over the number of people desperate for food seems a politicised diversion from the fact that the Israeli government is blocking virtually all food from getting in". Lew was thanked in statements by AIPAC, Jason Greenblatt, Arsen Ostrovsky, Mark Dubowitz, and Israeli Foreign Ministry spokesman Oren Marmorstein for "speaking the truth" and "setting the record straight".

== Controversies ==
On August 26, 2025, in an interview with The New Yorker staff writer Isaac Chotiner, Lew justified Israel's killing of children during the ongoing Gaza war, saying that "in many cases, the children were children of Hamas fighters, not children taking cover in places" and therefore "whether or not it was a legitimate military target flows from the population that’s there". "Killing and Maiming children" is one of the six grave violations against children in times of war as identified and condemned by the United Nations Security Council.

In June 2025, Robert Blecher and Chris Newton, in a piece written for the International Crisis Group, described a statement from Lew, in which he said that the situation in Gaza had been prevented "from crossing over into malnutrition and famine" during his tenure as ambassador, as "a claim so divorced from Gaza's nutritional reality as to defy comprehension."

In January 2026, the Council on American-Islamic Relations (CAIR) condemned Jack Lew and Stephanie Hallett as "war criminals" in response to the Reuters' reporting that they had suppressed internal government reports about humanitarian conditions in Gaza. CAIR's national deputy director Edward Ahmed Mitchell said "In any just international legal system, officials who knowingly conceal evidence of genocide to enable its continuation would be investigated as war criminals. Based on the facts as reported, Jack Lew and Stephanie Hallett did not merely fail in their duties, they allegedly used their power to suppress life-saving information, helping turn Gaza into a graveyard."

== Personal life ==
Lew married his high school sweetheart, Ruth Schwartz. As Chief of Staff, Lew commuted to Washington from the couple's home in the Riverdale neighborhood of the Bronx, New York City. They have two children, one of whom is Shoshana Lew, head of the Colorado Department of Transportation.

Lew is an Orthodox Jew who observes the Jewish Shabbat and has attended Beth Sholom Congregation in Potomac, Maryland; TheSHUL of the Nation's Capital and Kesher Israel Congregation in Washington, D.C.; and the Hebrew Institute of Riverdale in the Bronx, New York. Lew's former boss on the National Security Council, Sandy Berger, commented in a 2010 interview that "Lew's faith never got in the way of performing his duties." A 2011 press release from the Religion News Service noted that Lew also "has extensive connections in the American Jewish community," and that he might be able to help President Obama "build a more friendly rapport" with Israeli prime minister Benjamin Netanyahu.

In 1971, at the age of 16, Lew helped organize The New York March Against Hunger. In 2018, Lew was honored by Queens Community House for his lifelong contributions to social equality.

== See also ==
- List of Harvard University politicians
- List of Jewish United States Cabinet members
- Michael Herzog – Israeli Ambassador to the United States, 2021–2025

Political offices
Preceded by Franklin Raines	Director of the Office of Management and Budget; 1998–2001	Succeeded by Mitch Daniels
New office	Deputy Secretary of State for Management and Resources; 2009–2010	Succeeded by Tom Nides
Preceded by Jeff Zients; Acting	Director of the Office of Management and Budget; 2010–2012	Succeeded by Jeff Zients; Acting
Preceded by Bill Daley	White House Chief of Staff; 2012–2013	Succeeded by Denis McDonough
Preceded by Timothy Geithner	United States Secretary of the Treasury; 2013–2017	Succeeded by Steven Mnuchin
Diplomatic posts
Preceded by Thomas R. Nides	United States Ambassador to Israel; 2023–2025	Succeeded by Mike Huckabee
U.S. order of precedence (ceremonial)
Preceded by Chuck Hagel as former U.S. cabinet member	Order of precedence of the United States	Succeeded by Sally Jewell as former U.S. cabinet member
