= Nides =

Nides can refer to:

- Thomas Nides, U.S. official

NIDES stands for:

- Network Intrusion detection system
