= Northern Colorado Regional Airport =

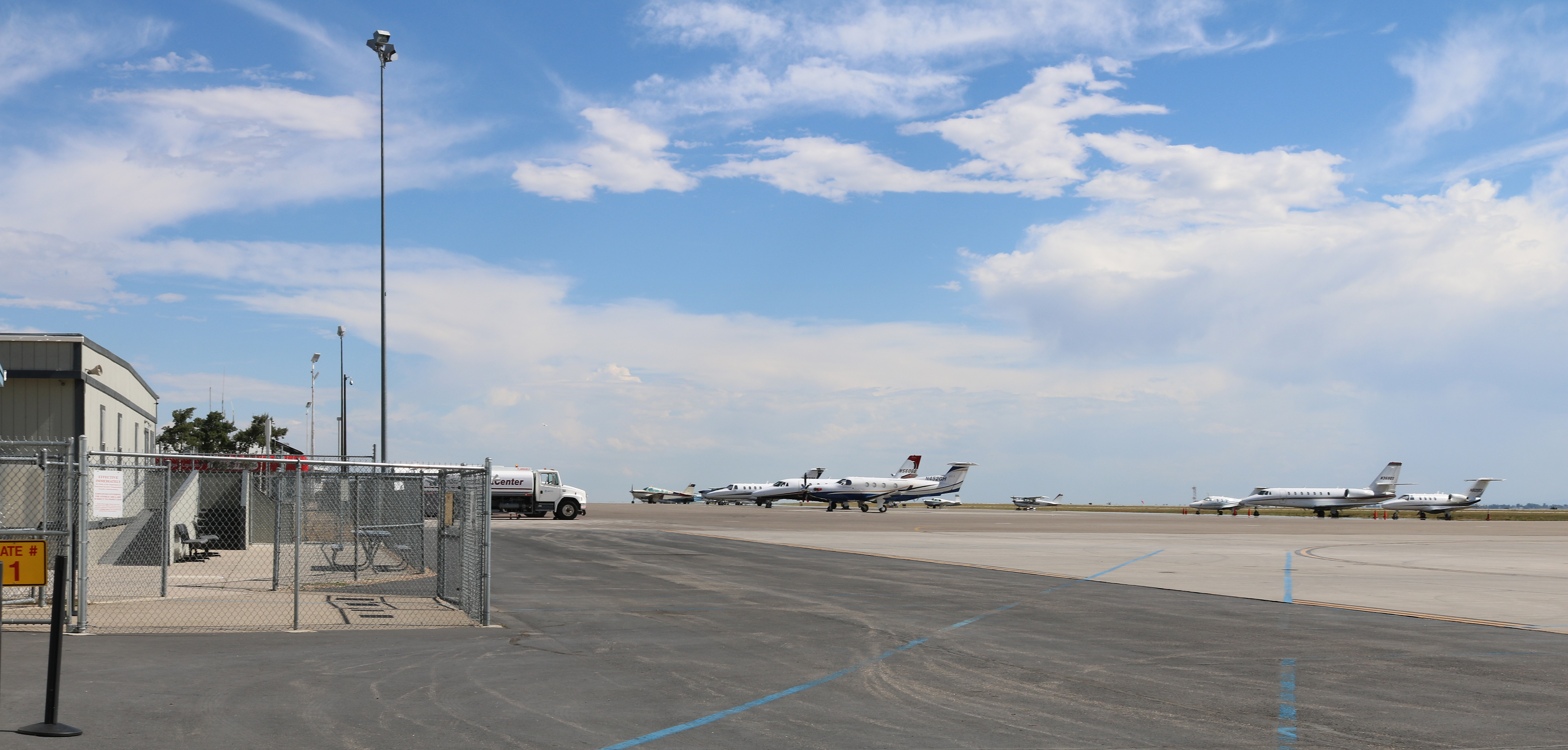
- IATA: FNL; ICAO: KFNL; FAA LID: FNL

Summary
- Airport type: Public
- Owner: Fort Collins & Loveland
- Serves: Fort Collins / Loveland, Colorado
- Elevation AMSL: 5,020 ft (1,530 m)
- Coordinates: 40°27′07″N 105°00′41″W
- Website: https://www.flynoco.com

Map
- Location of airport in Colorado FNL (the United States)

Runways
Direction	Length		Surface
Direction	ft	m	Surface
15/33	8,500	2,591	Asphalt
6/24	2,189	667	Asphalt

Statistics (2018)
- Aircraft operations: 94,896
- Based aircraft: 303
- Source: Federal Aviation Administration

Northern Colorado Regional Airport (IATA: FNL, ICAO: KFNL, FAA LID: FNL), formerly known as the Fort Collins–Loveland Municipal Airport, is a public use airport located nine nautical miles (10 mi, 17 km) southeast of the central business district of Fort Collins and northeast of Loveland, both cities in Larimer County, Colorado, United States.

The airport is situated west of Interstate 25 and Denver is located about 55 miles (89 km) south. It is most notable for serving the tourist areas of northern Colorado, such as the Rocky Mountain National Park, which is situated directly west of the airport. FNL primarily serves the Fort Collins–Loveland Metropolitan area located in Larimer County. The population for the metropolitan area is approximately 300,000.

Avelo Airlines launched service to both Burbank, California, and Las Vegas, Nevada, in October 2021. Avelo announced that they would cease all service at KFNL by June 24, 2022, via press release from the airport, citing increased fuel and supply prices for their exit.

As per Federal Aviation Administration records, the airport had 31,094 passenger boardings (enplanements) in calendar year 2008, 31,079 enplanements in 2009, and 35,671 in 2010 when Allegiant Air was providing scheduled service. It is included in the National Plan of Integrated Airport Systems for 2011–2015, which categorized it as a primary commercial service airport.

== History ==
FNL opened in 1964 under joint agreement and ownership by Loveland and Fort Collins. The construction of the airport followed a significant rise in Colorado State University's (CSU) enrollment due to the civil rights movement. The name was officially changed by the Northern Colorado Regional Airport Commission at the regular Commission meeting on April 27, 2016, to the Northern Colorado Regional Airport to better reflect the area served by the airport.

== Operation and management ==
FNL is jointly (50/50) owned and operated by the two cities of Loveland and Fort Collins. This means that it is publicly owned by the cities and follows a municipal structure. The Northern Colorado Regional Airport Commission provides direction for airport staff and is made up of two mayors and two city managers (one from each city) and three at large citizen members. There is no airport authority, which means funding and decisions are made on behalf of the two cities. However, to ensure proper balance in the decision-making process, the commission is required to communicate with both city councils and involve them in financial and development activities that occur outside of the councils' approved standard form. This was changed under the amended and restated Intergovernmental Agreement dated June 7, 2016. The airport manager at FNL is Jason Licon, who previously served 10 years as airport manager for the Kankakee Valley Airport Authority in Kankakee, Illinois.

== Facilities and aircraft ==
Northern Colorado Regional Airport covers an area of 1,065 acres (431 ha) at an elevation of 5,020 feet (1,530 m) above mean sea level. It has two runways with asphalt surfaces: 15/33 is 8,500 by 100 ft (2,591 by 30 m) and 6/24 is 2,189 by 40 ft (667 by 12 m).

For the 12-month period ending December 31, 2018, the airport had 94,896 aircraft operations, an average of 260 per day: 96% general aviation, 4% air taxi, <1% scheduled commercial, and <1% military. At that time there were 303 aircraft based at this airport: 258 single-engine, 17 multi-engine, 14 helicopter, 13 jet, and 1 glider.

On October 2, 2015, the Federal Aviation Administration announced that the airport would be used as a test facility for a remote air traffic control tower. This uses sensors and cameras that are operated remotely. The cost for this test phase was quoted at US$5,900,000, paid for by the Colorado Aviation Fund, and unanimously passed by the board of the Colorado Division of Aeronautics.

== Past and future airline service ==
From the mid-1970s through the early 1980s, Fort Collins received service by small commuter airlines including Air US and Air Link providing shuttle flights to Denver. Service was operated through an old airfield three miles east of downtown Fort Collins. There was then no service from 1982 through 1990. Service to FNL then began by Continental Express on behalf of Continental Airlines from 1990 through 1993 and by United Express on behalf of United Airlines from 1992 through 1997. Both carriers operated shuttle flights to Denver using mainly Beechcraft 1900 aircraft. Continental Express also used larger ATR 42 aircraft.

The airport was then served by Allegiant Air from 2003 until October 2012. In August 2012, the airline e-mailed airport officials revealing that operations would end. The airline said it was due to an "internal business decision" to airport officials for a period of several months. In late September 2012, at a Texas airline conference, Allegiant CEO Maurice Gallagher told a reporter from Las Vegas, Nevada that the airline left because the airport had no control tower. Since then, the airline has not elaborated on that issue. Allegiant Air previously operated McDonnell Douglas MD-80 jetliners into Loveland with nonstop service to and from Las Vegas and Phoenix/Mesa Gateway Airport.

There was air service between Northern Colorado Regional Airport and Chicago Rockford International Airport, which was announced in June 2015, operated by Elite Airways beginning on August 27, 2015. Elite Airways primarily used the 50 passenger Bombardier CRJ200 regional jet and the 70 passenger Bombardier CRJ700 regional jet on the Fort Collins to Chicago/Rockford flights. On October 28, 2016, the flights with Elite Airways ended.

In 2018, the Colorado Department of Transportation Division of Aeronautics was nearing completion on the Remote Tower Project at the airport. In 2021, Avelo Airlines announced that it would begin operations at the airport, with flights to Hollywood Burbank Airport in California launching on October 6, 2021. This service was suspended by the airline on June 24, 2022.

In 2021, United Airlines, in partnership with Landline, started operating "wingless" options with 4 times per day bus service to Denver International Airport. Luggage is checked through to passengers' final destinations. Passengers are presently not screened through TSA, requiring them to go through security at the Denver International Airport. However, departures from Denver depart from the concourse level.

== Accidents at and near FNL ==
- On April 17, 1981, an Air US Handley Page Jetstream collided with a Sky's West Parachute Center Cessna 206 in mid-air about 2 miles ESE of FNL airport. All 13 passengers and crew on the Air US flight and 2 occupants who were skydivers on the Cessna 206 were killed.
- On November 23, 2024, a Civil Air Patrol aircraft on a routine search and rescue aerial photography practice mission that departure from KFNL crashed on Storm Mountain due west of the airport. Both the pilot and aerial photographer were killed. The co-pilot survived with serious injuries.
- On April 19, 2025, a Mooney M20 made a belly landing on runway 15. The pilot, the only occupant of the plane, survived.

== See also ==
- List of airports in Colorado
