= Richard R. Verma =

American diplomat (born 1968)

Richard Verma
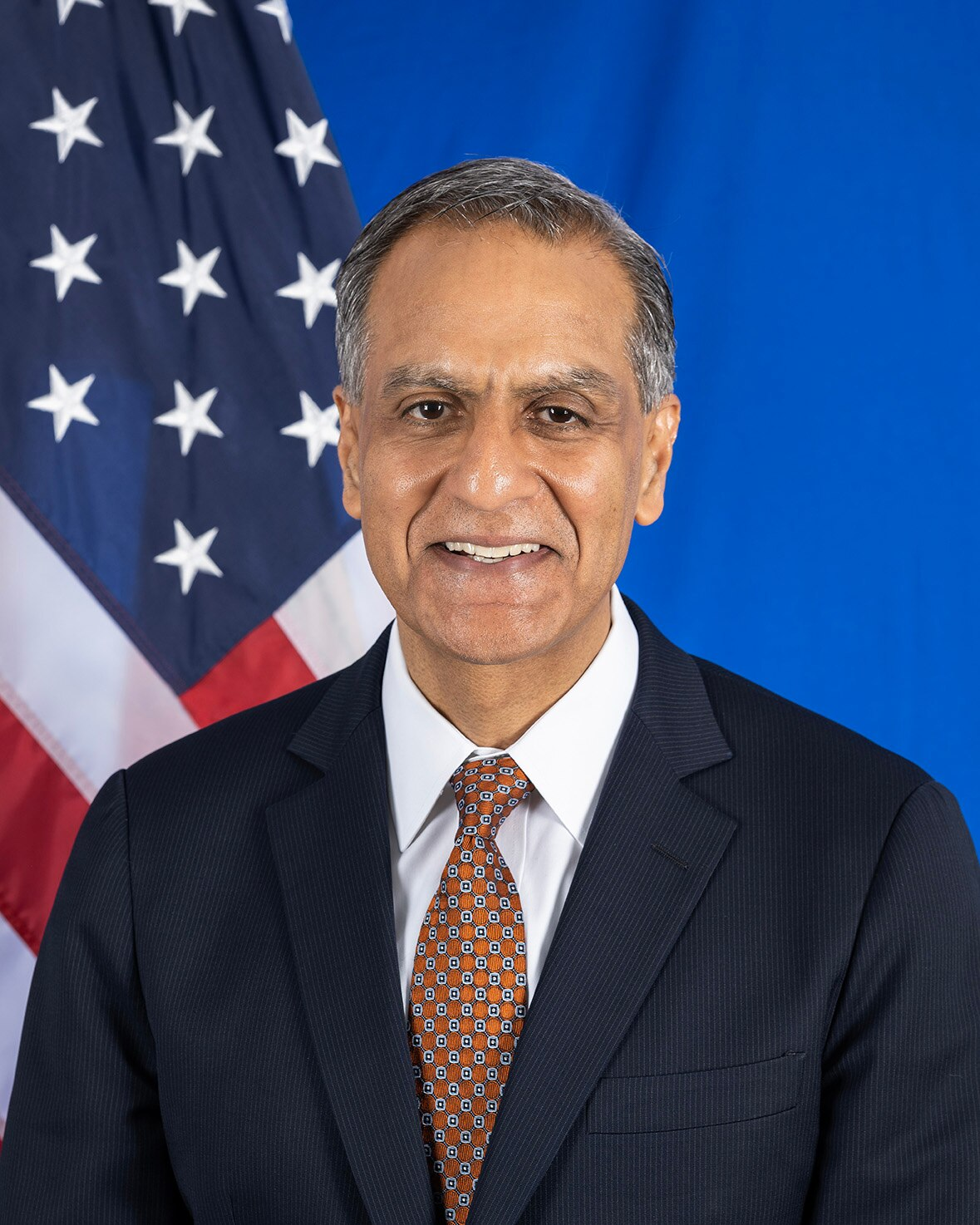
- Official portrait, 2023

5th United States Deputy Secretary of State for Management and Resources
- In office April 5, 2023 – January 20, 2025
- President: Joe Biden
- Preceded by: Brian P. McKeon
- Succeeded by: Michael Rigas

United States Ambassador to India
- In office January 16, 2015 – January 20, 2017
- President: Barack Obama
- Preceded by: Kathleen Stephens (Acting)
- Succeeded by: MaryKay Carlson (Acting)

28th Assistant Secretary of State for Legislative Affairs
- In office April 6, 2009 – March 14, 2011
- President: Barack Obama
- Preceded by: Matthew Reynolds
- Succeeded by: David S. Adams

Personal details
- Born: Richard Rahul Verma; November 27, 1968 (age 57) Edmonton, Canada
- Party: Democratic
- Spouse: Melineh Verma
- Children: 3
- Education: Lehigh University (BS); American University (JD); Georgetown University (LLM, PhD)

Military service
- Branch/service: United States Air Force
- Years of service: 1994–1998
- Unit: United States Air Force Judge Advocate General's Corps

Richard Rahul Verma (born November 27, 1968) is an American diplomat, who served as the deputy secretary of state for management and resources, a position he held from April 5, 2023, to January 20, 2025. He served as the assistant secretary of state for legislative affairs from 2009 to 2011, and as the U.S. ambassador to India from 2014 to 2017. He served as the chief legal officer and head of global public policy at Mastercard, from 2020 to 2023, and as the vice chair of the Asia Group from 2017 to 2020, where he oversaw the firm's South Asia practice. He also practiced law for many years at Steptoe & Johnson LLP in Washington DC, and served as a Senior Counselor and Lead of the India and South Asia practice at Albright Stonebridge Group.

== Early life and education ==
Verma's Punjabi parents were born in India and lived through the partition of India. They first immigrated to the United States in the early 1960s. Verma's father was an English professor at the University of Pittsburgh at Johnstown for forty years, and was originally from Apra, Punjab, India. His late mother was a special education teacher.

The youngest of five children, Verma grew up in Johnstown, Pennsylvania, and attended public school in the Westmont Hilltop School District. Verma holds degrees from Georgetown University (PhD), Georgetown University Law Center (LLM), American University Washington College of Law (JD), and Lehigh University (BS, Industrial Engineering). At Lehigh, Verma was an ROTC cadet, member of Lambda Chi Alpha, and senior class president.

== Early career ==
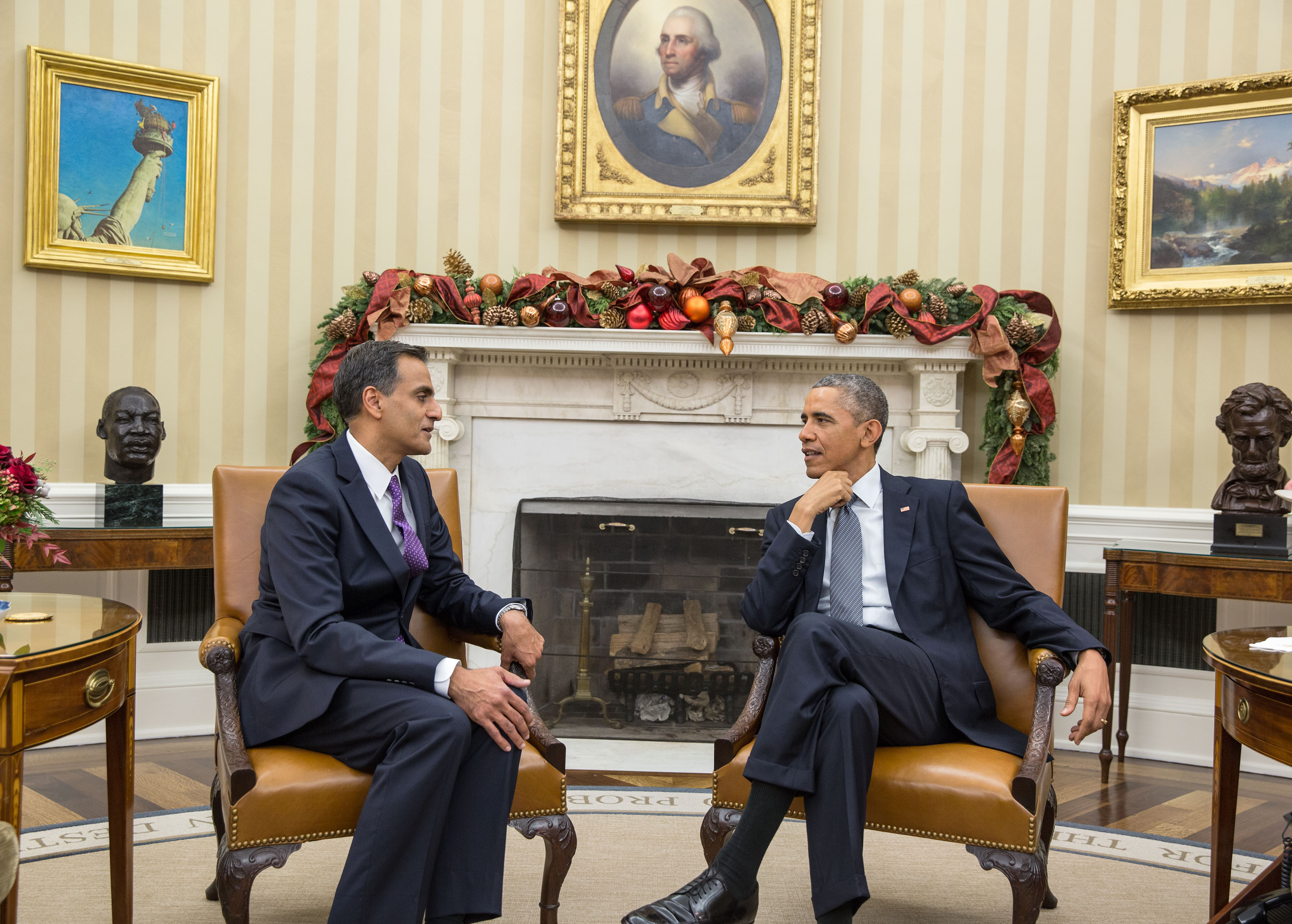
Verma with then-president Barack Obama in December 2014

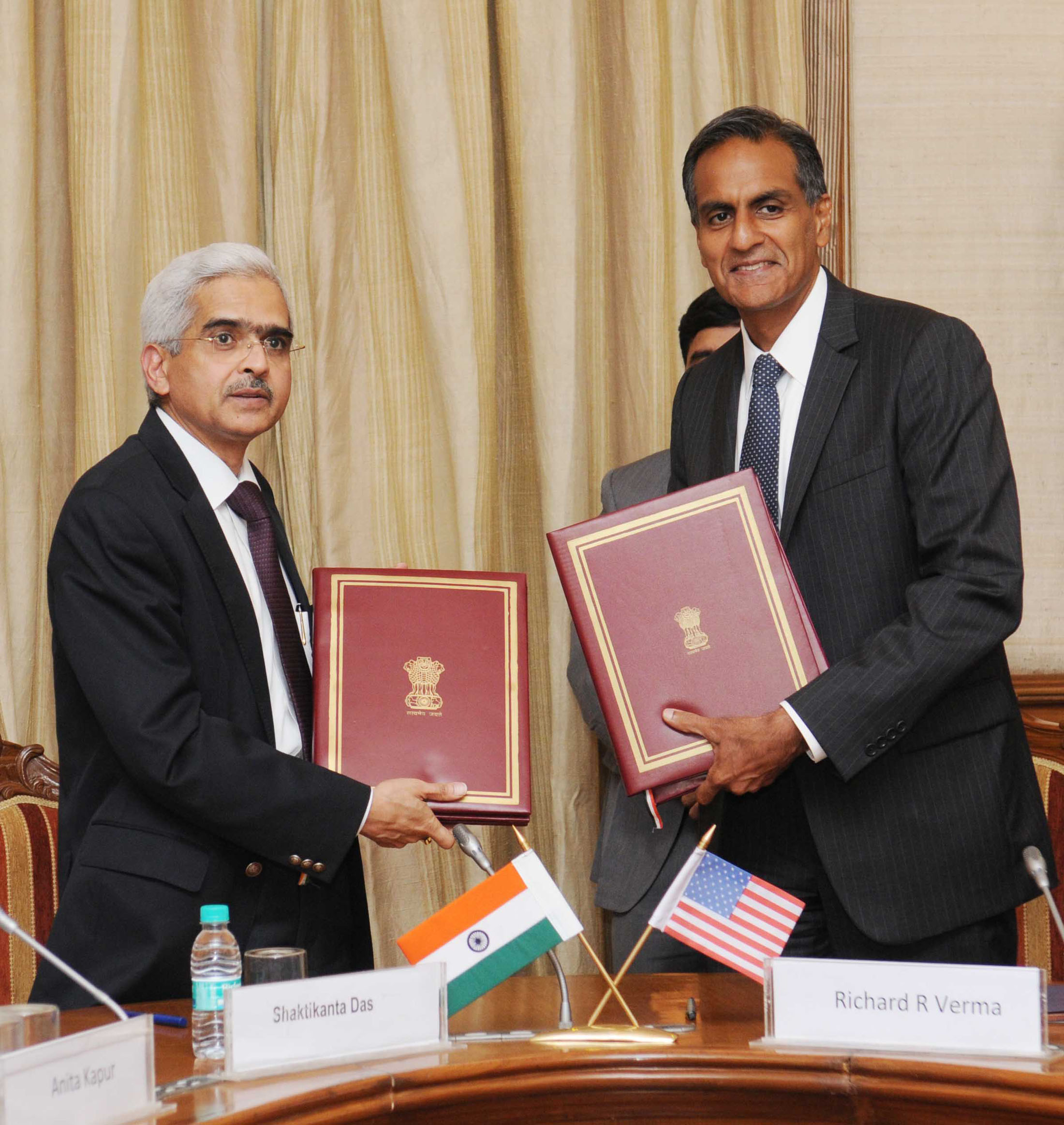
Verma with India's then-revenue secretary Shaktikanta Das at the signing of FATCA in 2015

Verma began his career in the U.S. Air Force as an Air Force judge advocate, serving on active duty from 1994 to 1998. His military decorations include the Meritorious Service Medal and the Air Force Commendation Medal.

Verma later served as the senior national security advisor to Senate majority leader Harry Reid from 2002 to 2007. In 2008, he was a member of the Commission on the Prevention of WMD proliferation and terrorism, and co-authored World at Risk (2008).

After the inauguration of President Barack Obama, he joined the State Department in 2009 as assistant secretary of state for legislative affairs under Secretary Hillary Clinton, replacing Matthew A. Reynolds.

== U.S. ambassador to India ==
In September 2014, President Obama nominated Verma as the next U.S. ambassador to India. On December 4, 2014, the United States Senate Committee on Foreign Relations voted to forward Verma's nomination to the full Senate. On December 9, 2014, Verma was unanimously confirmed by the U.S. Senate

Verma was the first person of Indian descent to hold the position. As ambassador to India, Verma is credited with the historic deepening and expansion of U.S.-India bilateral ties. Verma oversaw one of the largest U.S. diplomatic missions in the world, including four consulates with staff from nearly every agency in the U.S. Government. During his tenure, he championed historic progress in India–United States relations. He oversaw several meetings between President Obama and Prime Minister Narendra Modi, and created over 100 new initiatives and more than 40 government-to-government dialogues. He was also the first U.S. ambassador to travel to every Indian state.

== Post-ambassador career ==
Verma stepped down from his post as ambassador on January 20, 2017, following the inauguration of President Donald Trump.

Verma went on to serve as chief legal officer at Mastercard. Verma is also an active thought leader and commentator on international relations, international law, trade, and diplomacy. He served as a senior fellow the Belfer Center for Science and International Affairs, and served on the boards of T. Rowe Price and the National Endowment for Democracy. He is a trustee of Lehigh University, where he gave the 151st commencement address in May 2019. He was a centennial fellow at the Walsh School of Foreign Service and co-chaired the Center for American Progress U.S.-India Task Force.

In May 2022, Verma was appointed to serve as a member of the President's Intelligence Advisory Board.

== Deputy Secretary of State for Management and Resources ==
In December 2022, President Joe Biden announced his intent to nominate Verma for the role of deputy secretary of state for management and resources. His nomination was praised by the Indian American Impact Fund. On March 30, 2023, the United States Senate confirmed him by a 67–26 vote. Verma was sworn in on April 5, 2023. On August 16, 2024, he took over the responsibilities of the U.S. Special Representative for Ukraine's Economic Recovery from former Commerce Secretary, Penny Pritzker.

== Personal life ==
Verma is married and has three children.

He is the recipient of numerous awards and honors, including the State Department's Distinguished Service Medal, the Council on Foreign Relations International Affairs Fellowship, and the Chief Justice John Marshall Lifetime Service Award. He was named by India Abroad magazine as one of the fifty most influential Indian-Americans in the country.

Political offices
Preceded by Matthew Reynolds	Assistant Secretary of State for Legislative Affairs; 2009–2011	Succeeded by Joseph Macmanus; Acting
Preceded by Brian P. McKeon	Deputy Secretary of State for Management and Resources; 2023–2025	Succeeded by Michael Rigas
Diplomatic posts
Preceded by Kathleen Stephens; Acting	United States Ambassador to India; 2015–2017	Succeeded by Kenneth I. Juster
