= Michael Rigas =

American government official

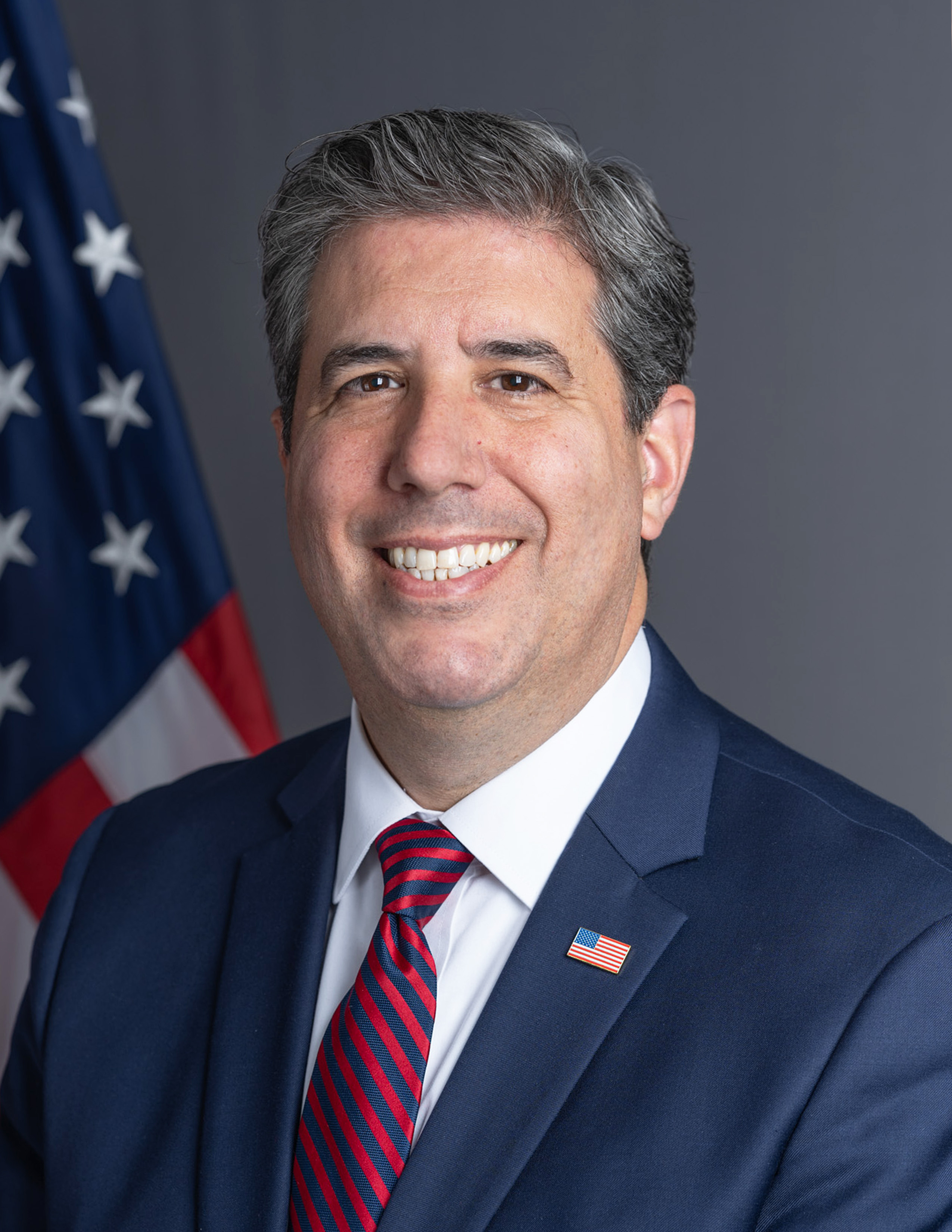
- Official portrait, 2025

CEO of the United States Agency for Global Media
- Acting
- Assumed office March 12, 2026
- President: Donald Trump
- Preceded by: Amanda Bennett; Victor Morales (acting)

6th United States Deputy Secretary of State for Management and Resources
- Incumbent
- Assumed office May 19, 2025
- President: Donald Trump
- Preceded by: Richard R. Verma

Administrator of General Services
- Acting; July 21, 2025 – December 24, 2025
- President: Donald Trump
- Preceded by: Stephen Ehikian (acting)
- Succeeded by: Edward Forst

Director of the Office of Personnel Management
- Acting; March 18, 2020 – January 20, 2021
- President: Donald Trump
- Preceded by: Dale Cabaniss
- Succeeded by: Kathleen McGettigan

Deputy Director of the Office of Personnel Management
- In office March 9, 2018 – January 20, 2021
- President: Donald Trump
- Succeeded by: Rob Shriver

Personal details
- Born: Michael John Rigas; 1971 or 1972 (age 53–54) Boston, Massachusetts, U.S.
- Party: Republican
- Education: Boston University (BA, MA); Harvard University (MPA)

Michael John Rigas (born 1971 or 1972) is an American government official. He currently serves as both the acting CEO of the United States Agency for Global Media and deputy secretary of state for management and resources. He previously served as the acting director of the General Services Administration, acting director of the Office of Personnel Management, and deputy director of the Office of Personnel Management. In August 2026, President Trump nominated him to serve as a member of the board of directors of the Export–Import Bank of the United States.

== Early life ==
Rigas was born in 1971 or 1972 in Boston, Massachusetts, where he grew up. His parents come from Greece, with his father having immigrated to the U.S. in 1948 from Aigio, while his mother came from Sparta. He is one of seven children and has a twin sister. He attended Boston University, where he earned a bachelor's degree and a master's degree in economics, and Harvard University, where he studied at the Harvard Kennedy School and received a master's degree in public administration.

== Career ==
Rigas began his career in the private sector, working for Mellon Financial Corporation and Brown Brothers Harriman & Co. He also held a position for the United Asset Management Corporation.

Rigas was appointed to the General Services Administration (GSA) during the administration of President George W. Bush. He was an associate administrator for the agency and held the positions of senior advisor and deputy administrator. During this time, he was part of an effort to improve the level of government contracting to woman- and veteran-owned businesses.

After his service in the Bush administration, Rigas worked for several Republican organizations. He was an official for the Massachusetts Republican Party and worked for the Heritage Foundation, a conservative think tank. Following that, he worked for the Massachusetts Department of Veterans' Services as chief of staff.

In July 2017, Rigas was nominated by President Donald Trump to serve as deputy director of the United States Office of Personnel Management (OPM). On March 7, 2018, he was unanimously confirmed by the Senate to serve in the position, with Rigas thus serving under the OPM's director, Jeff Tien Han Pon. On March 18, 2020, Rigas became the acting director of the OPM after the resignation of the then-director, Dale Cabaniss. In this role, he was head of the agency in charge of managing human resources, talent recruitment, development, and policy for the employees of the federal government.

Soon after, on March 25, Rigas also became the acting deputy director for management in the Office of Management and Budget (OMB). In July, he added a third role, becoming the acting chief information officer of the United States (CIO) after the resignation of Suzette Kent. The CIO traditionally reported to the deputy director for management of the OMB, a position that Rigas also held simultaneously.

After Rigas's tenure with the OPM and OMB, he joined the America First Policy Institute in 2022 as the director of the organization's America First Transition Project. After Donald Trump won the 2024 presidential election, he announced on December 13, 2024, the nomination of Rigas to serve as deputy secretary of state for management and resources.

=== Deputy secretary of state for management and resources ===
Rigas was appointed deputy secretary of state for management and resources by Donald Trump on December 12, 2024. Trump called him a "conservative warrior who knows how government works." He had his confirmation hearing before the Senate Foreign Relations Committee on March 4, 2025. The Committee voted 16–6 in favor of his nomination on March 12, 2025.

=== Acting administrator of the General Services Administration ===
On July 21, 2025, Rigas was appointed acting administrator of the General Services Administration.

=== Board of directors of the Export-Import Bank ===
In August 2026, President Trump nominated him to serve as a member of the board of directors of the Export-Import Bank of the United States.

== Personal life ==
Rigas married Laura Keehner, a fellow government official, in 2009.
