= Shoshana Lew =

American government official

- Father: Jack Lew

Executive Director of the Colorado Department of Transportation
- Incumbent
- Assumed office February 5, 2019
- Governor: Jared Polis
- Preceded by: Mike Lewis

Chief Operating Officer of the Rhode Island Department of Transportation
- In office April 23, 2017 – January 2019
- Governor: Gina Raimondo
- Preceded by: Peter Garino
- Succeeded by: Loren Doyle

Shoshana M. Lew (born 1983) is a career government administrator currently serving as the executive director of the Colorado Department of Transportation. She is the daughter of United States Ambassador to Israel Jack Lew.

== Career ==
The Colorado Senate confirmed Lew's appointment to the position of executive director of the Colorado Department of Transportation (CDOT) on February 5, 2019. Prior to heading the Colorado Department of Transportation, Lew worked from April 2017 to January 2019 as the chief operating officer of the Rhode Island Department of Transportation. Before her appointment to Rhode Island's Department of Transportation, Lew worked for eight years in the Obama administration. The federal government positions she held were Chief Financial Officer, U.S. Department of Transportation, Assistant Secretary for Budget and Programs, U.S. Department of Transportation, Senior Adviser, U.S. Department of the Interior, Bureau of Ocean Energy Management, and Policy Adviser, White House Domestic Policy Council.

Lew has a bachelor's degree in history from Harvard University and a master's degree in history from Northwestern University. Lew's first position after she completed her graduate degree was at the Brookings Institution, where she served as policy analyst and research and policy assistant in the organization's Metropolitan Policy Program from 2007-2009.

== Tenure ==
Under Lew's tenure, the Colorado Department of Transportation has placed a greater emphasis on sustainable transportation, as opposed to freeway expansion. Under her leadership, the Colorado Transportation Commission approved a policy designed to stop any increases in greenhouse gas emissions from transportation in Colorado, by requiring transportation planners to calculate any emissions associated with a project and mitigate accordingly. The policy was approved by the State Transportation Commission on a 10-1 vote. Apart from environmental benefits, this policy could deliver $40 billion in economic benefits, including fewer traffic collisions.

Under this policy, the governor-appointed Colorado Transportation Commission would have authority to restrict funding for use only on climate-friendly transportation projects if the CDOT or a regional planning authority fails to meet its emissions reduction target. Lew stated that this policy allows for capacity increases, but that major projects would require offsets in the form of climate-friendly additions. Examples include the Bustang and Flatiron Flyer bus systems that serve Colorado communities. The transportation commission would also have the authority to grant waivers to this policy. Lew stated this policy enables Colorado to "lead by example" in reducing emissions, in the face of increasing impacts of climate change. The policy has received national attention for its approach to limiting highway expansion. However, it also received criticism for some who were concerned that the CDOT had become "preoccupied with cleaning the air."

In her capacity as CDOT executive, Lew also serves as the CDOT representative to the Denver region's Regional Air Quality Council.
