= Brian P. McKeon =

American government official (born 1964)

Brian McKeon
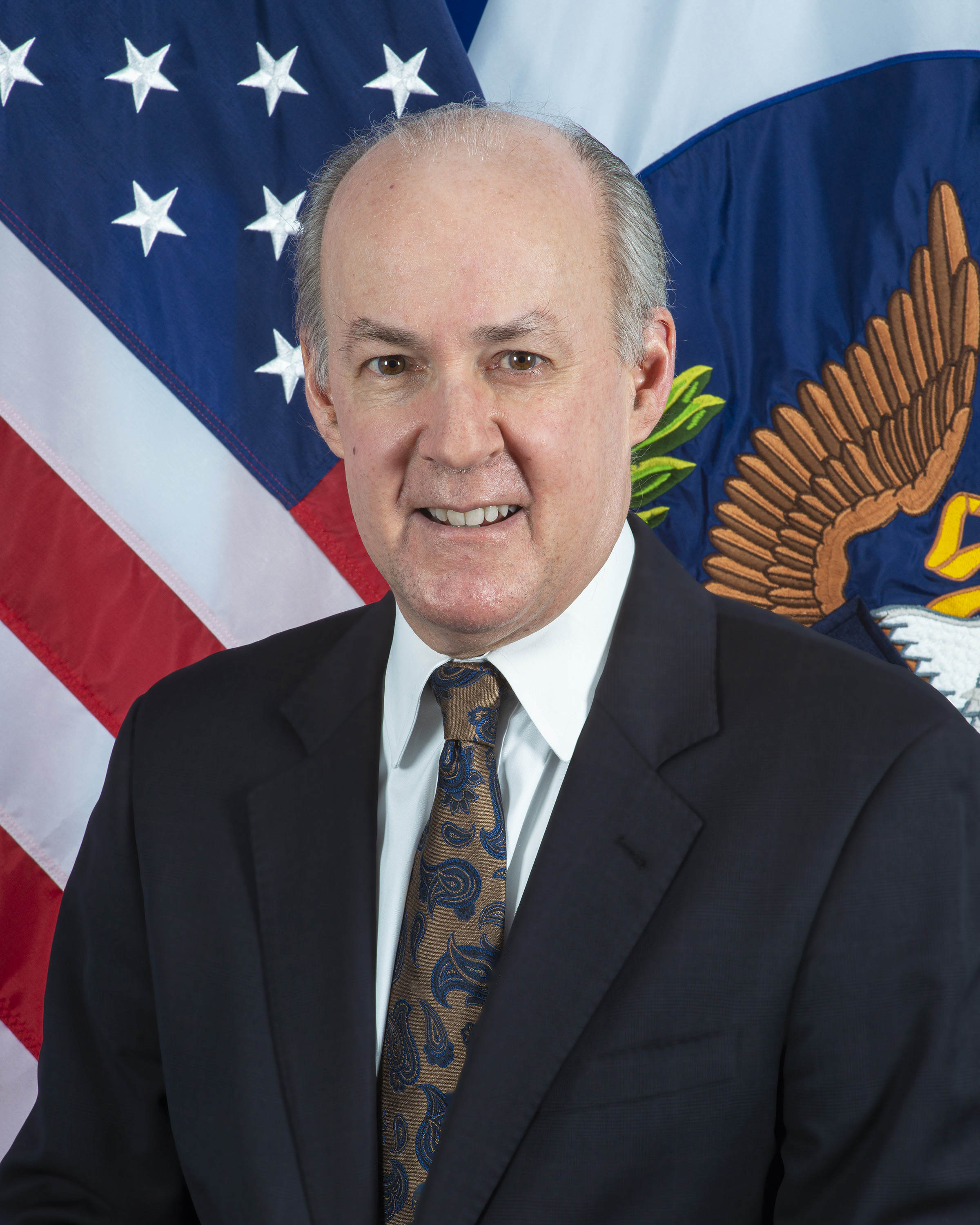

4th United States Deputy Secretary of State for Management and Resources
- In office March 19, 2021 – December 31, 2022
- President: Joe Biden
- Preceded by: Heather Higginbottom (2017)
- Succeeded by: Richard R. Verma

Acting Under Secretary of Defense for Policy
- In office June 10, 2016 – January 20, 2017
- President: Barack Obama
- Preceded by: Christine Wormuth
- Succeeded by: Theresa Whelan (acting)

Principal Deputy Under Secretary of Defense for Policy
- In office July 28, 2014 – June 10, 2016
- President: Barack Obama
- Preceded by: Kathleen H. Hicks
- Succeeded by: David B. Shear

Executive Secretary and Chief of Staff of the United States National Security Council
- In office March 16, 2012 – July 28, 2014
- President: Barack Obama
- Preceded by: Nate Tibbits
- Succeeded by: Suzy George

Personal details
- Born: Brian Patrick McKeon; February 11, 1964 (age 62) Auburn, New York
- Education: University of Notre Dame (BA); Georgetown University (JD)

Brian Patrick McKeon (born February 11, 1964) is an American attorney and national security advisor who served as the Deputy Secretary of State for Management and Resources in the Biden Administration from March 2021 to December 2022.

== Early life and education ==
McKeon was born and raised in Auburn, New York, graduating from Auburn High School in 1981. He earned a Bachelor of Arts degree in government and international relations from University of Notre Dame in 1985 and a Juris Doctor from the Georgetown University Law Center in 1995.

== Career ==
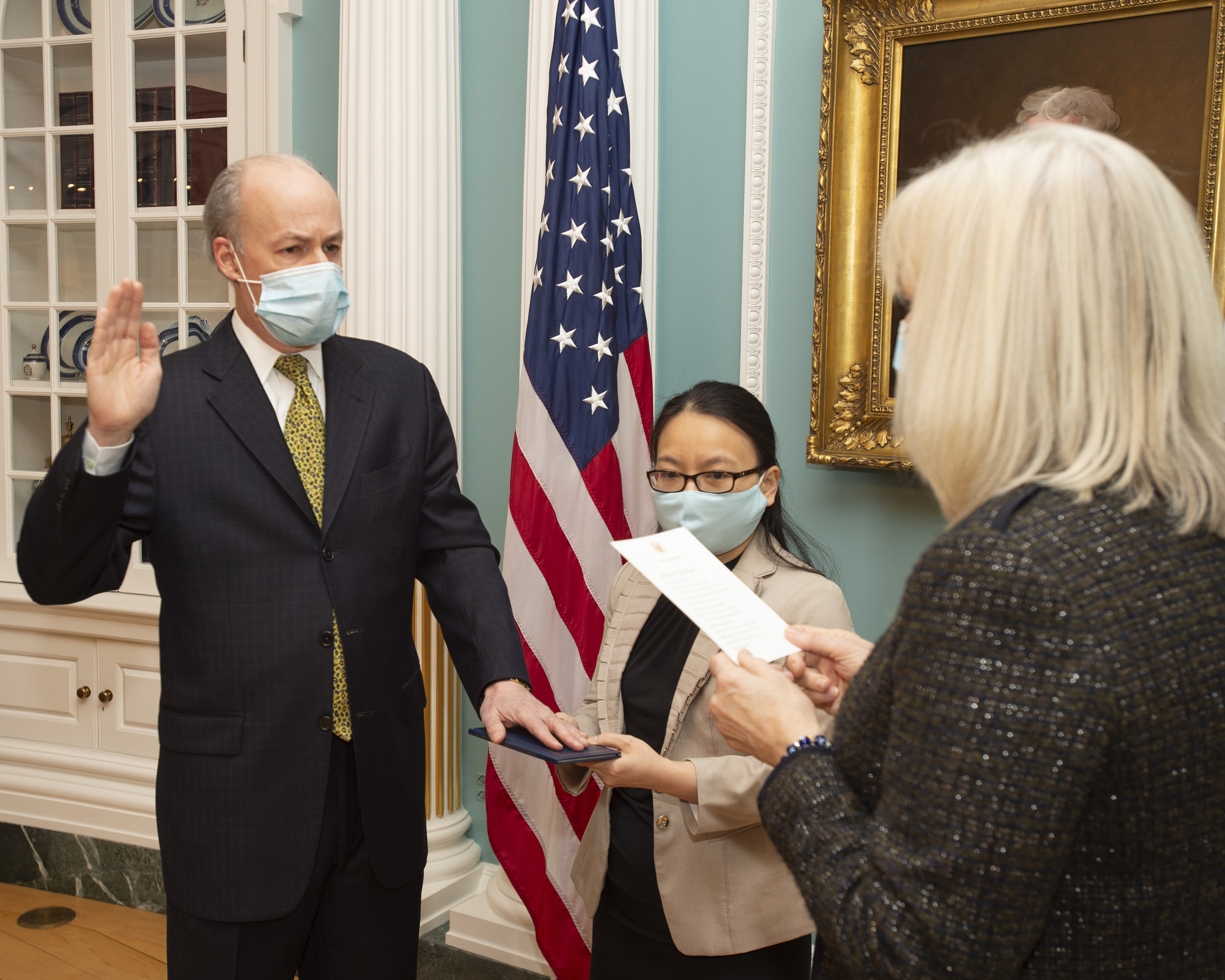
McKeon is sworn in as the U.S. Deputy Secretary of State for Management and Resources at the U.S. Department of State in Washington, D.C., on March 19, 2021.

During law school, McKeon was a law clerk for Judge Robert G. Doumar of the United States District Court for the Eastern District of Virginia. From 1987 to 1995, McKeon worked in the office of then-Senator Joe Biden, including as a legislative assistant specializing in foreign policy and defense. From 1997 to 2009, he was chief counsel for Democratic members of the United States Senate Committee on Foreign Relations. After Biden became vice president of the United States, McKeon was selected to serve as his deputy national security advisor. He later became the COO for the United States National Security Council (NSC). From 2012 to 2014, he was executive secretary of the NSC. McKeon served as principal deputy Under Secretary of Defense for Policy from 2014 to 2017. After leaving the Obama Administration, McKeon became the executive director of the Penn Biden Center at the University of Pennsylvania. He has also written columns on national security issues for Just Security.

=== Biden administration ===
On January 16, 2021, it was announced that McKeon would be nominated to serve as Deputy Secretary of State for Management and Resources in the incoming Biden Administration. On February 13, 2021, his nomination was sent to the Senate. On March 11, 2021, his nomination was reported out of the Senate Foreign Relations Committee. On March 18, 2021, his nomination was confirmed in the Senate by voice vote. He was sworn into office on March 19, 2021. He resigned on December 31, 2022.

Political offices
Preceded by Heather Higginbottom (2017)	Deputy Secretary of State for Management and Resources; 2021–2022	Succeeded by Richard R. Verma
