= Deputy Secretary of State for Management and Resources =

Political office in the United States

Deputy Secretary of State for Management and Resources of the United States of America
- Seal of the Department of State

- Flag of the deputy secretary of state of management and resources

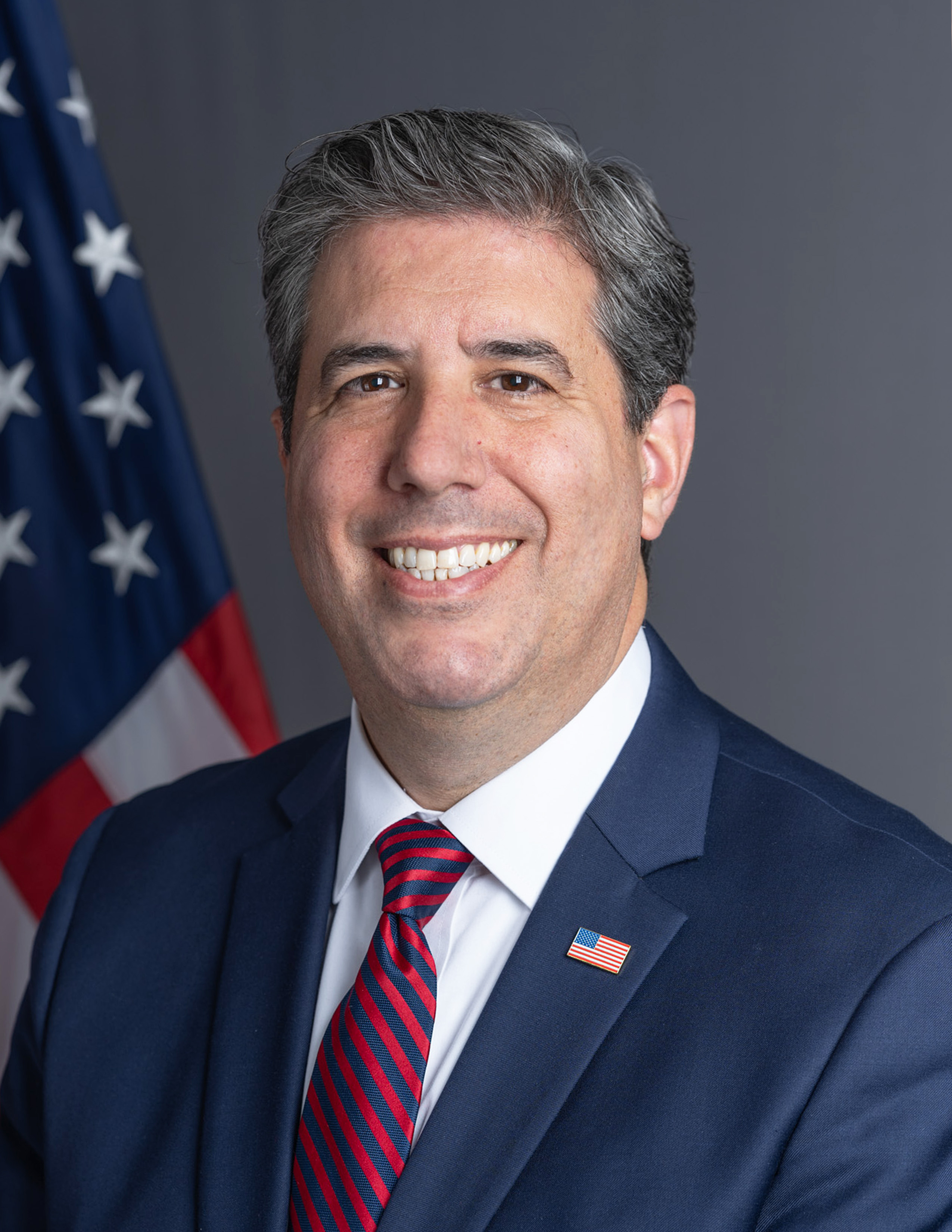
- Incumbent; Michael Rigas since May 19, 2025
- U.S. Department of State
- Reports to: U.S. Secretary of State
- Seat: Washington, D.C.
- Appointer: The president with Senate advice and consent
- Term length: No fixed term
- First holder: Jacob Lew
- Salary: Executive Schedule, level 2
- Website: Official website

The United States deputy secretary of state for management and resources is the third in charge of the United States Department of State. Along with the deputy secretary of state, the deputy secretary for management and resources is a principal advisor to the secretary of state and shares in the global responsibility for U.S. foreign policy. The deputy secretary for management and resources also has broad responsibilities for oversight and coordination of U.S. foreign assistance and overseas diplomatic operations. The role is sometimes referred to as the "chief operating officer" of the State Department.

The position was created by Congress in 2000, in Title IV, Section 404 of Public Law 106-553. However, the position was not filled until 2009, when President Barack Obama appointed Jack Lew to the position. The position was left vacant under President Donald Trump, but it was reestablished under President Joe Biden in 2021 with the appointment of Brian McKeon.

The State Department is the only federal Cabinet-level agency with two co-equal deputy secretaries. The original deputy secretary office is the "first assistant" for the purposes of the Vacancies Reform Act, but both deputy secretaries have full delegated authority to act for the secretary, if not otherwise prohibited by law.

== Deputy secretaries of state for management and resources ==
No.	Portrait	Name	Term began	Term ended	President(s) served under
1		Jack Lew	January 28, 2009	November 18, 2010	Barack Obama
2		Thomas R. Nides	January 3, 2011	February 15, 2013	Barack Obama
3		Heather Higginbottom	December 13, 2013	January 20, 2017	Barack Obama
		Vacant	January 20, 2017	January 20, 2021	Donald Trump
4		Brian P. McKeon	March 19, 2021	December 31, 2022	Joe Biden
–		John R. Bass (acting)	January 1, 2023	April 4, 2023	Joe Biden
5		Richard R. Verma	April 5, 2023	January 20, 2025	Joe Biden
6		Michael Rigas	May 19, 2025	Present	Donald Trump
