= Thomas R. Nides =

American banker and diplomat (born 1961)

Tom Nides
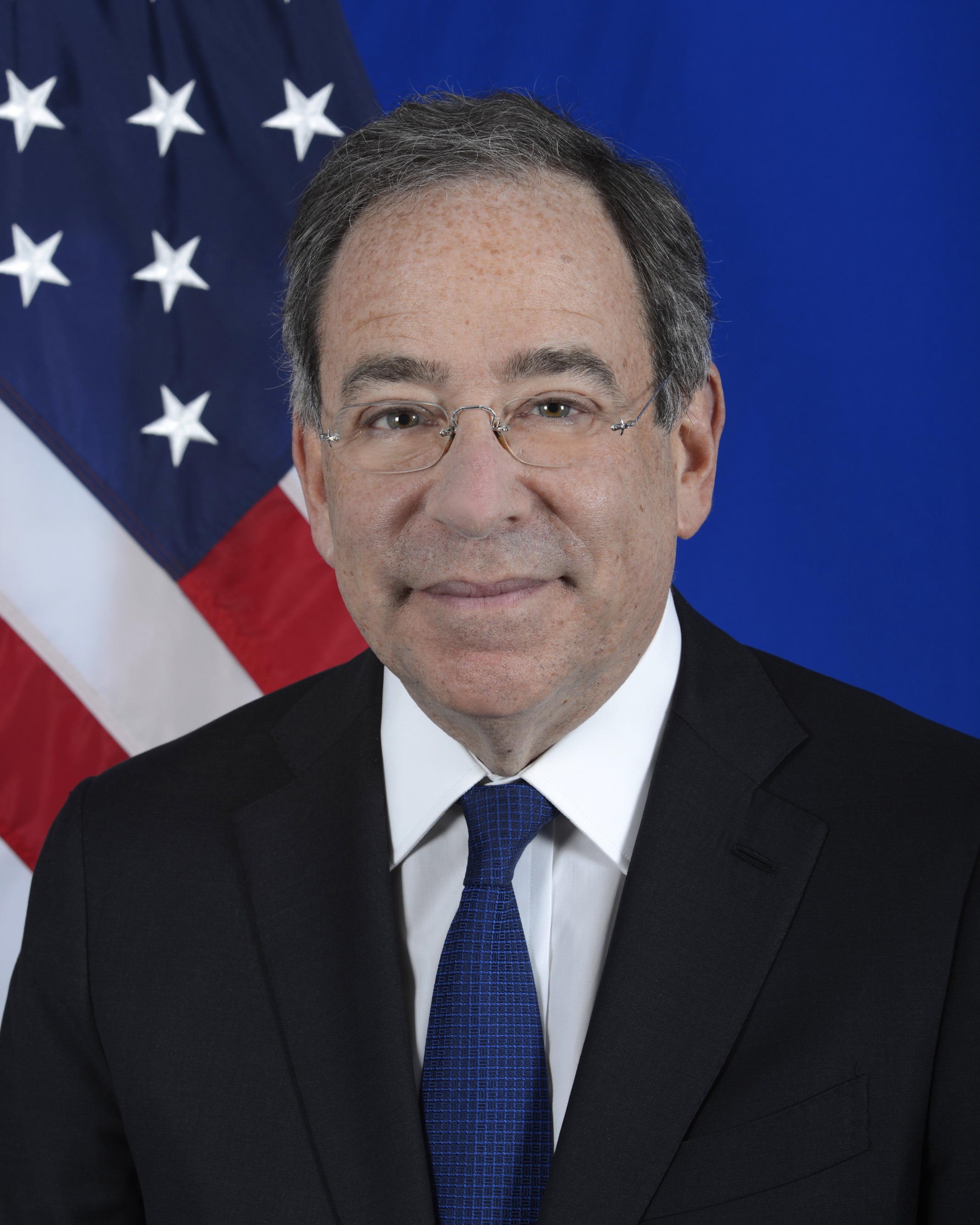
- Official portrait, 2021

27th United States Ambassador to Israel
- In office December 5, 2021 – July 21, 2023
- President: Joe Biden
- Preceded by: David M. Friedman
- Succeeded by: Jack Lew

2nd Deputy Secretary of State for Management and Resources
- In office January 3, 2011 – February 15, 2013
- President: Barack Obama
- Preceded by: Jack Lew
- Succeeded by: Heather Higginbottom

Personal details
- Born: Thomas Richard Nides; February 25, 1961 (age 65) Duluth, Minnesota, U.S.
- Party: Democratic
- Spouse: Virginia Moseley
- Children: 3
- Education: University of Minnesota (BA)

Thomas Richard Nides (born February 25, 1961) is an American banker and diplomat who served as the 27th United States ambassador to Israel from 2021 to 2023.

From 2013 to 2021, he was the managing director and vice-chairman of Morgan Stanley, serving as a member of the firm's management and operating committee.

Nides was previously appointed as the second deputy secretary of state for management and resources from 2011 to 2013 during the Obama administration. He has served in various financial and governmental roles throughout his life.

== Early life and career ==
Thomas Richard Nides was born on February 25, 1961, to a Jewish family in Duluth, Minnesota, the son of Shirley (née Gavronsky) and Arnold Richard Nides. He is the youngest of eight children.

His father was the founder of Nides Finance, a national consumer-finance company, and president of Duluth's Temple Israel and Jewish Federation.

Thomas Nides attended Duluth East High School, where as a senior, he convinced then-Vice President Walter Mondale to speak at the high school graduation. He later graduated from the University of Minnesota with a degree in political science.

== Career ==
=== Early political career ===
During Nides's freshman year of college, he worked as an intern for Mondale, where he shared an office with future Senator Amy Klobuchar. After graduating, he worked on Mondale's 1984 presidential campaign as the Midwest field director. Then, from 1986 to 1989, Nides worked for the majority whip of the United States House of Representatives, Tony Coelho; among other tasks, he was put in charge of managing House races for the 1986 midterms. After Coelho's resignation, Nides worked in the office of Speaker Tom Foley from 1989 to 1993. In 1994, during the Clinton administration, he served as chief of staff for United States trade representative Mickey Kantor, where he played a crucial role in the passage of the North American Free Trade Agreement (NAFTA).

=== Banking ===
In 1994, Nides joined the Federal National Mortgage Association (Fannie Mae) as senior vice president, before briefly leaving in 1996 to work at Morgan Stanley. In 1997, he returned to Fannie Mae to resume a new position as Vice President of Human Resources, with him holding this position until 2001. From 2001 to 2004, he was then chief administrative officer of Credit Suisse First Boston, the investment banking division of Zurich-based Credit Suisse Group, and later served for one year as worldwide president and chief executive officer of Burson-Marsteller. From 2005 to 2010, he was the COO of Morgan Stanley.

After voluntarily leaving his position at the State Department, Nides rejoined Morgan Stanley in March 2013 as managing director and vice chairman. He also became a member of Morgan Stanley's Operating and Management Committees with this job. He informed CEO James P. Gorman he would be departing from the firm effective July 1, 2021.

=== Government ===
On September 29, 2010, President Barack Obama nominated Nides to be deputy secretary of state for management and resources. He was confirmed by the Senate on December 22, 2010, and sworn into office on January 3, 2011. For his service in the position, Secretary of State Hillary Clinton awarded Nides the Secretary of State's Distinguished Service Award in January 2013, the nation's highest diplomatic honor.

In 2016, Nides declined to join Hillary Clinton's campaign. He was also considered for the role of White House chief of staff by Hillary Clinton had she won that year's presidential election.

==== U.S ambassador to Israel ====
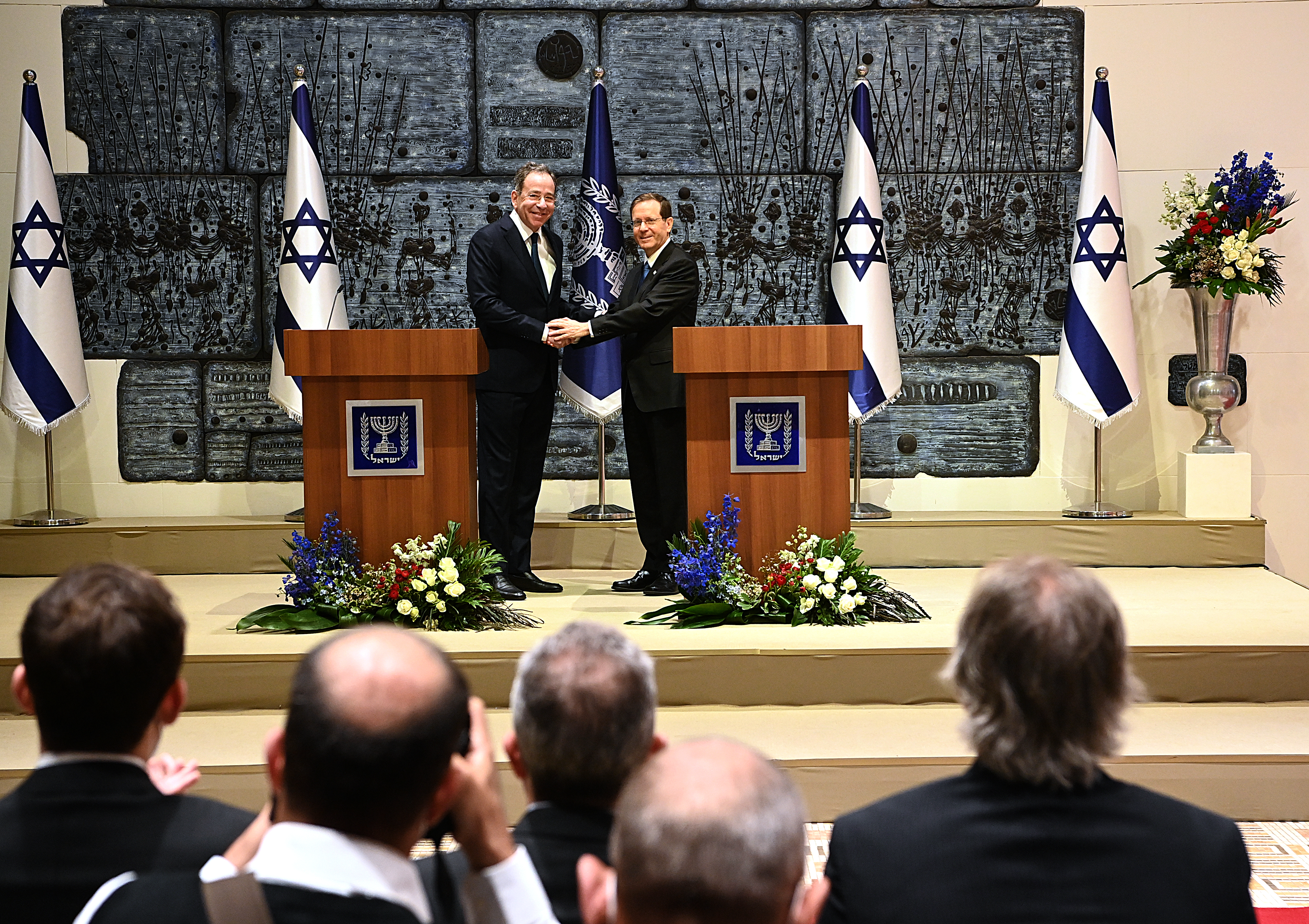
Nides presents his credentials to Israeli President Isaac Herzog on December 5, 2021. In the background is an Israeli volcanic ash artwork.

Several months after the inauguration of President Joe Biden, Nides emerged as the front-runner candidate for ambassador to Israel. In May 2021, Biden offered the position to Nides, which he accepted. Biden officially announced the nomination on June 15, 2021, alongside other ambassador picks. On June 23, 2021, his nomination was sent to the Senate. On September 22, 2021, a hearing on his nomination was held before the Senate Foreign Relations Committee. On October 19, 2021, his nomination was reported favorably out of committee. On November 3, 2021, he was confirmed by the United States Senate by voice vote. He presented his credentials to President Isaac Herzog on December 5, 2021.

Nides completed his term as ambassador in July 2023.

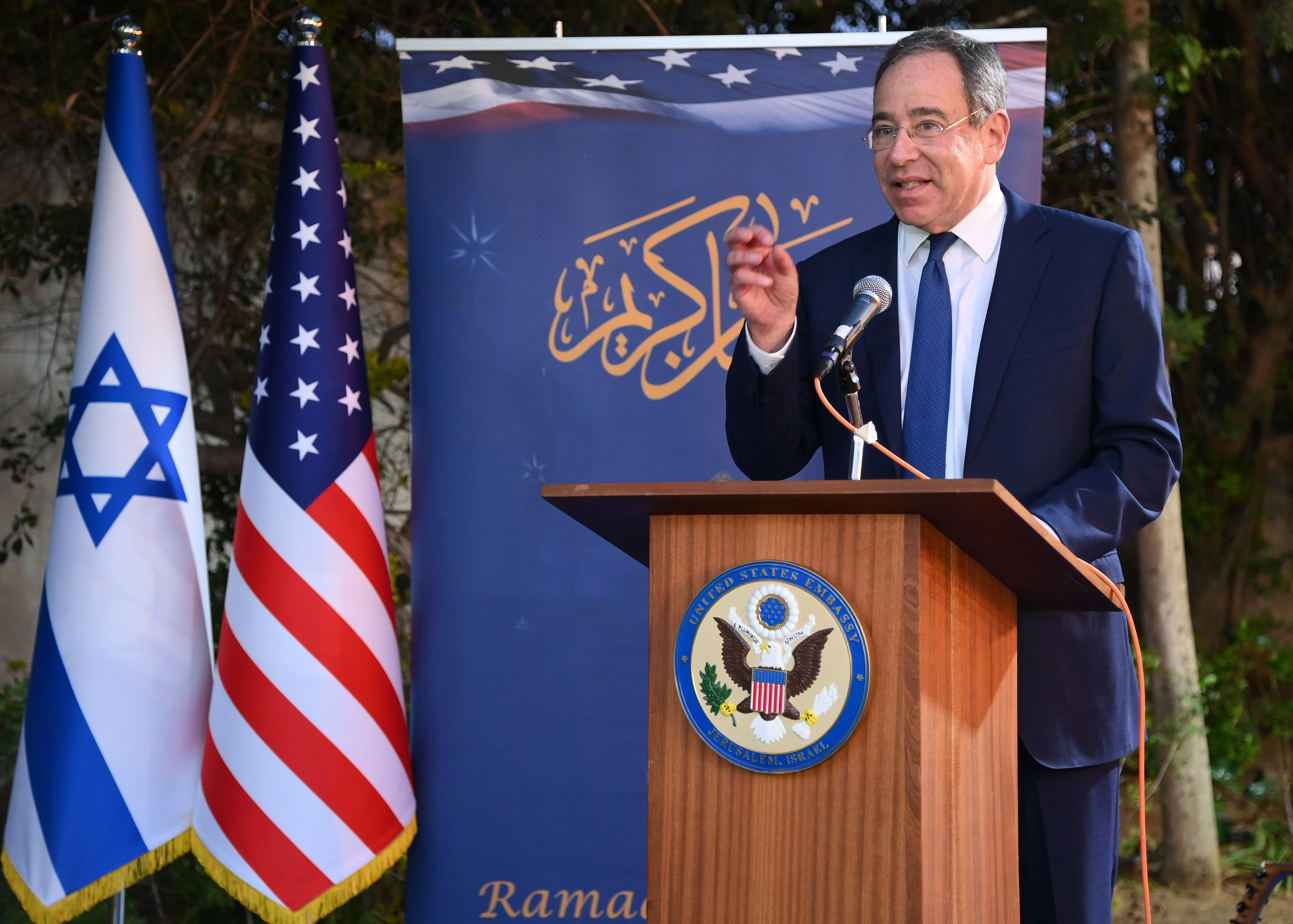
U.S. Ambassador Thomas Nides hosts the Embassy's annual Iftar gathering on April 3, 2023

=== Board memberships ===
Nides serves on numerous non-profit boards including the Atlantic Council, the International Rescue Committee, the Partnership for Public Service, and the Urban Alliance Foundation. He is a member of the Council on Foreign Relations and is the former Chairman of the Board of the Woodrow Wilson Center, a leading non-partisan think tank, being appointed in September 2013 by President Obama and serving till 2017.

== Personal life ==
In 1992, he married Virginia Carpenter Moseley, currently CNN’s senior vice president of newsgathering for the network's U.S. operation, in an interfaith ceremony conducted by a Lutheran minister, James D. Ford, chaplain of the United States House of Representatives. Nides and Moseley are parents to two adult children.

Nides was named by The Jerusalem Post as one of the fifty most influential Jews for 2022.

Political offices
Preceded by Jack Lew	Deputy Secretary of State for Management and Resources; 2011–2013	Succeeded by Heather Higginbottom
Diplomatic posts
Preceded by David M. Friedman	United States Ambassador to Israel; 2021–2023	Succeeded by Stephanie Hallett; Acting
