= Heather Higginbottom =

American government official (born 1972)

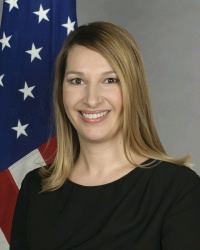
- Higginbottom in 2014

3rd United States Deputy Secretary of State for Management and Resources
- In office December 20, 2013 – January 20, 2017
- President: Barack Obama
- Preceded by: Thomas Nides
- Succeeded by: Brian P. McKeon (2021)

30th Counselor of the United States Department of State
- In office February 1, 2013 – December 13, 2013
- President: Barack Obama
- Preceded by: Cheryl Mills
- Succeeded by: Tom Shannon

Deputy Director of the Office of Management and Budget
- In office October 20, 2011 – February 1, 2013
- President: Barack Obama
- Preceded by: Rob Nabors
- Succeeded by: Brian Deese

Deputy Director of the Domestic Policy Council
- In office January 20, 2009 – October 20, 2011
- President: Barack Obama
- Director: Melody Barnes
- Succeeded by: Mark Zuckerman

Personal details
- Born: July 15, 1972 (age 54) Binghamton, New York, U.S.
- Party: Democratic
- Education: University of Rochester (BA); George Washington University (MPP)

Heather Anne Higginbottom (born July 15, 1972) is currently the head of the JPMorgan Chase Policy Center. Prior to her current role, she served as CARE USA's Chief Operating Officer beginning in 2017. Higginbottom was the U.S. Deputy Secretary of State for Management and Resources from 2013 to 2017. She previously served as counselor of the United States Department of State and prior to that had served as Deputy Director of the federal Office of Management and Budget from 2011 until 2013.

On October 20, 2011, the United States Senate voted 64–36 to confirm her nomination to be Deputy Director of the OMB. She had previously served as the Deputy assistant to the President for Domestic Policy and Deputy Director of the Domestic Policy Council in the administration of Barack Obama from 2009 to 2010, after serving as policy director of the Obama for America campaign.

== Early life and education ==
Higginbottom attended Chenango Valley High School in Binghamton, New York. She received her master of public policy degree from the Trachtenberg School of Public Policy and Public Administration at George Washington University. She obtained her undergraduate degree from the University of Rochester.

== Career ==
Higginbottom's career began as a government relations specialist for Communities In Schools, followed by her role in the office of then Senator John Kerry as legislative assistant in 1999. During her years in Senator Kerry's staff, she handled a wide array of domestic and foreign policy issues, and eventually served as his legislative director, overseeing all policy matters. She also served as the deputy policy director for the Kerry-Edwards presidential campaign. After the 2004 election, Higginbottom founded and served as executive director of the American Security Project, before returning the staff of Senator John Kerry. On November 24, 2008, it was announced that Higginbottom was appointed the deputy director of the Domestic Policy Council in the administration of President Barack Obama.

On January 7, 2011, President Obama nominated Higginbottom to the position of deputy director of the Office of Management and Budget. Some Senate Republicans united in opposing Higginbottom's nomination, citing her "lack of business and accounting experience," however she was confirmed in the Senate in a 64–36 vote on October 20, 2011.

After John Kerry was confirmed to be United States secretary of state in 2013, he hired Higginbottom as counselor. In 2013, Obama nominated Higginbottom to serve as deputy secretary of state for management and resources. On November 14, 2013, her nomination was reported to the full U.S. Senate by the United States Senate Committee on Foreign Relations. On December 13, 2013, the Senate confirmed her in a 74–17 vote.

Beginning in March 2017, Higginbottom served as the chief operating officer of CARE, a major humanitarian agency delivering emergency relief and long-term international development to fight global poverty.

In 2019, Higginbottom was named head of the new JPMorgan Chase PolicyCenter.

Political offices
Preceded by Jeff Liebman; Acting	Deputy Director of the Office of Management and Budget; 2011–2013	Succeeded by Brian Deese
Preceded by Cheryl Mills	Counselor of the United States Department of State; 2013	Succeeded by Tom Shannon
Preceded by Thomas Nides	Deputy Secretary of State for Management and Resources; 2013–2017	Succeeded by Brian P. McKeon
