= Colorado Division of Aeronautics =

State agency of Colorado, United States

Colorado Division of Aeronautics is part of the Colorado Department of Transportation. The Division's main office is located at Front Range Airport.

== Aeronautics Board ==
The seven-member Colorado Aeronautical Board (CAB) was created by statute in 1988 and is responsible for aviation development in Colorado. Members of the Board represent specific statewide aviation interests. Appointed by the Governor to serve three-year terms, the Colorado Aeronautical Board is designed as representative of both governmental and aviation-interest constituencies.

The Colorado Department of Transportation Aeronautics Division administratively supports the Colorado Aeronautical Board on issues of aviation safety, as technical advisors, as support of government and individual aviation needs through entitlement reimbursements of aviation and fuel tax revenues and a discretionary aviation grant program, as well as in maintaining the state aviation system plan.

Both the Aeronautical Board and the Aeronautics Division work within the Colorado Department of Transportation to establish and encourage multi-modal aspects in today's transportation.

== Colorado Airport System ==
The Colorado Airport System include a total of 74 public-use airports. These airports are categorized into 14 airports that serve the public with scheduled commercial air service, and 60 general aviation airports. Each of Colorado's airports offer a unique set benefits for each of its surrounding communities including emergency medical access, employment and economic generation. Airports in Colorado are a vital public resource and play a dynamic role in Colorado's multi-modal transportation system.

== Discretionary Aviation Grant Program ==
Since legislation in 1991 channeled aviation fuel taxes to "aviation purposes", the CDOT - Division of Aeronautics has reimbursed 65% of those taxes back into the airports - of - origin in the form of regular entitlement funds. At the same time, the Colorado Aeronautical Board began conducting the Colorado Discretionary Grant Program, utilizing the remaining 35% of tax revenues to serve the maintenance, capital equipment, and developmental needs of Colorado's 74 public-use airports.

In June 2003, new legislation was signed into law by Governor Bill Owens. Senate Bill 49 continuously appropriates fuel tax dollars into the Colorado Aviation Fund. This legislation gives the Colorado Aeronautical Board increased flexibility when dispursing discretionary grant dollars into the Colorado Airport System.
