= Colorado Department of Transportation =

Government agency in Colorado, United States

Colorado Department of Transportation (CDOT)

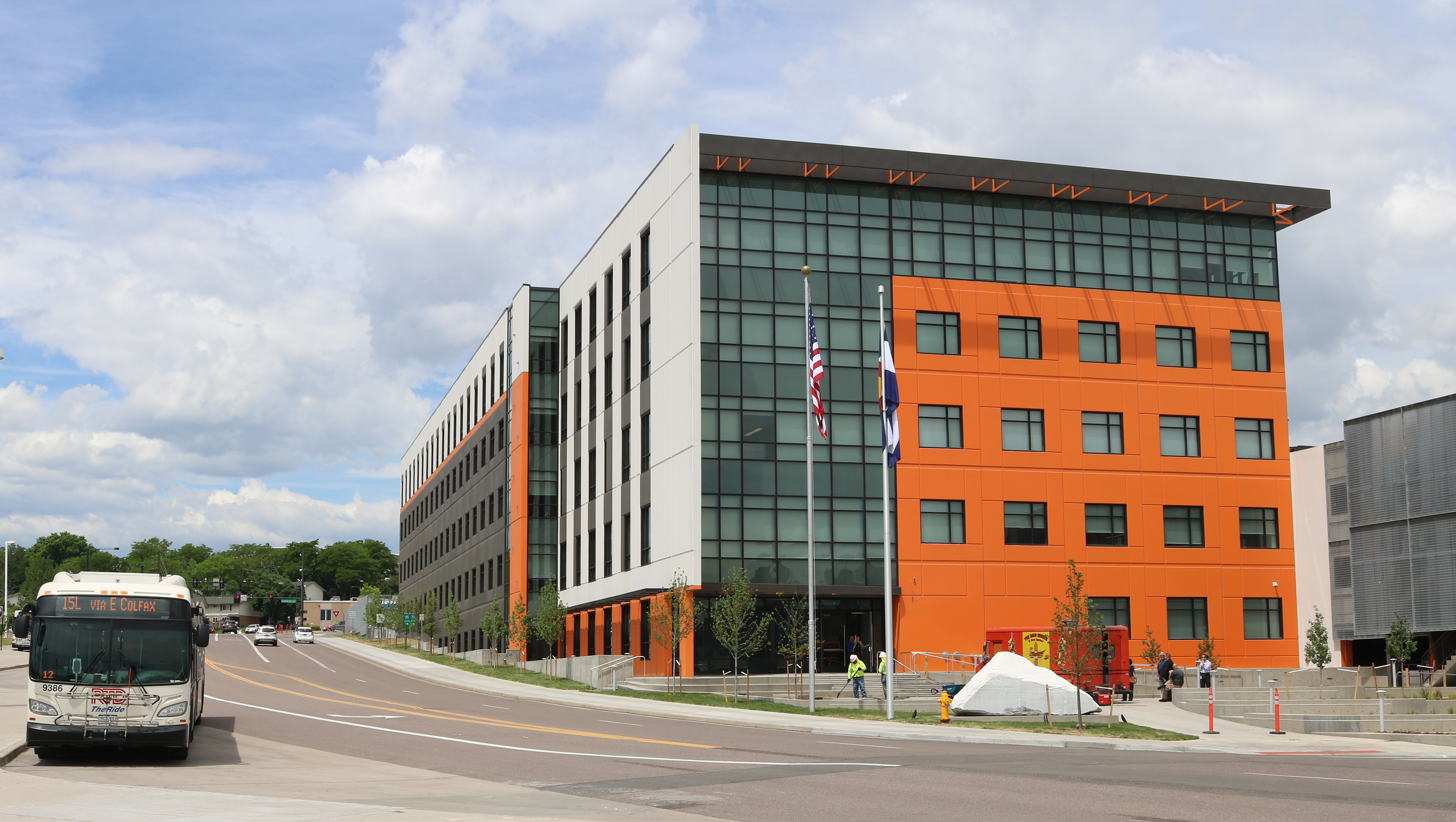
- CDOT headquarters in Denver

Agency overview
- Formed: 1917
- Jurisdiction: Colorado
- Headquarters: 2829 W. Howard Place Denver, Colorado, U.S. 80204
- Employees: 3,000
- Annual budget: $2 billion
- Agency executives: Shoshana M. Lew, Executive Director; Herman Stockinger, Deputy Director; Steve Harelson, Chief Engineer
- Parent agency: State of Colorado
- Website: codot.gov

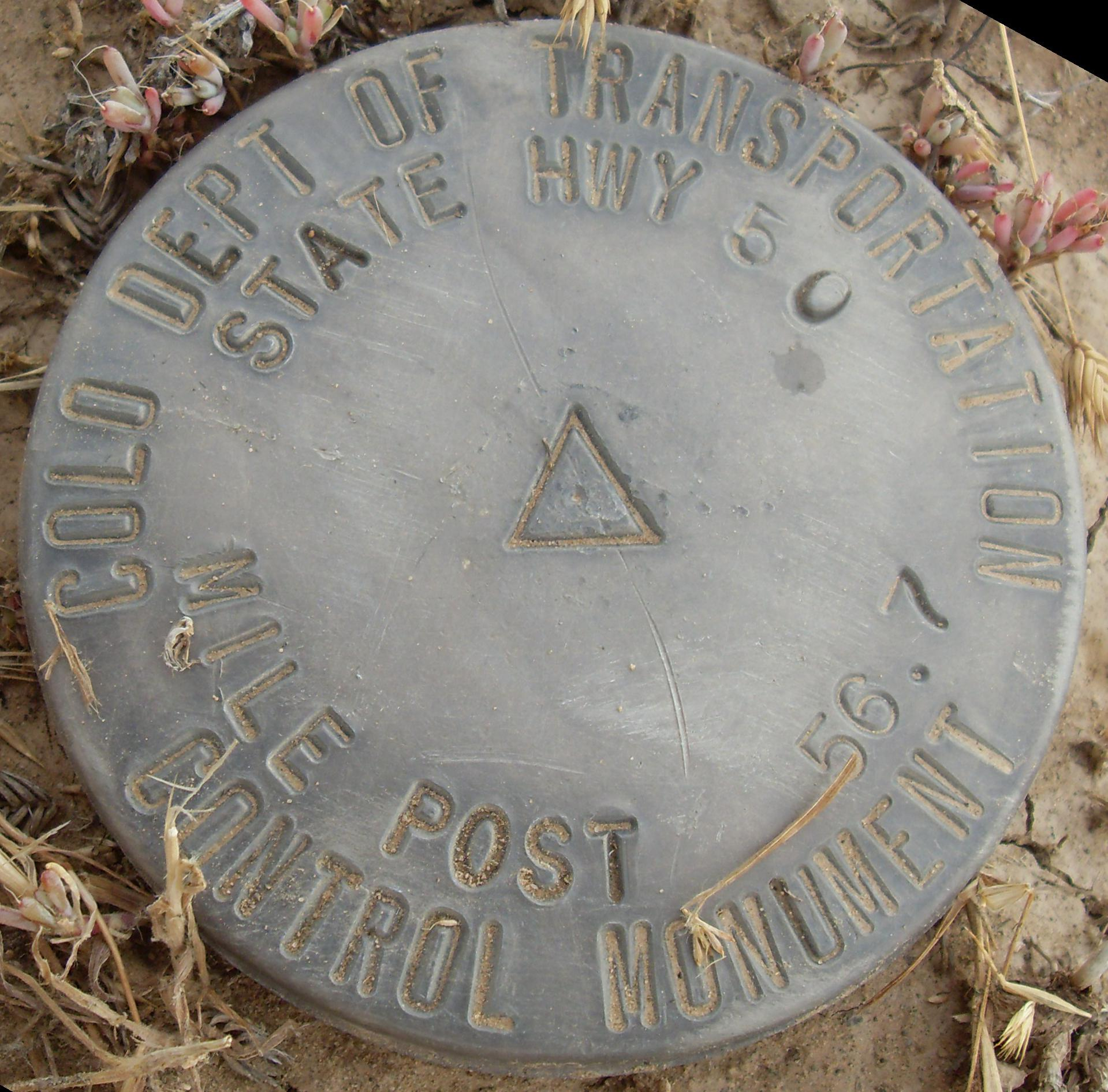
CDOT Control Monument on U.S. Highway 50 near Grand Junction

The Colorado Department of Transportation (CDOT, pronounced See Dot) is the principal department of the Colorado state government that administers state government responsibility for transportation in the state of Colorado. CDOT is responsible for maintaining Colorado's 9,144-mile highway system, including 3,429 bridges with over 28 billion vehicle miles of travel per year. CDOT's stated Mission is "To provide the best multi-modal transportation system for Colorado that most effectively moves people, goods, and information." It is governed by the Transportation Commission of Colorado.

Motor Carriers over 10,000 lbs are regulated by the state and are required to obtain a federal United States Department of Transportation (USDOT) safety tracking number used to monitor carriers' safety management practices and controls.

== History ==
The Colorado Department of Transportation has its roots in 1909, when the first highway bill was passed by forming a three-member Highway Commission to approve work and allocate funds. The Commission first took their post on January 1, 1910. In 1917, the State Highway Fund was created and the State Highway Department was formed. In 1935, Highway Department employees were joined by 44 new co-workers selected from among 7,500 applicants to become the first members of the Colorado State Highway Courtesy Patrol. The Patrol later became a division of the Highway Department.

In 1947, the first National System of Interstate and Defense Highways was approved by the federal works administrator. In Colorado, approved routes included all of I-25 from the Wyoming border to Raton Pass; all of I-80S (now I-76); and I-70 from Denver to the Kansas border. In 1953 the state legislature passed a new law reorganizing the Highway Department and renaming it the Colorado Department of Highways. In 1956, Congress passed the Federal Interstate Highways Act. Among the approvals was the section of I-70 from Denver to the Utah border. In 1968, legislation reorganized highway matters and created the Colorado Department of Highways (CDOH) with 3 main divisions: Division of Highways, Division of Planning and Research, and Division of Patrol. In 1991 – CDOH became CDOT to better align its functions and budgets with Federal Highway Administration / U.S. Department of Transportation.

On January 29, 2026, Colton Wiedman, an employee of the Colorado Department of Transportation, was driving a snowplow on Interstate 70. The vehicle crossed a median, struck a car, and killed the driver. In April 2026, Wiedman was charged with multiple misdemeanors related to the crash.

== Sustainable transportation policy ==
The state adopted a low emission vehicle standard in 2018 and a Zero emission vehicle standard in 2019, which are projected to cause a reduction in greenhouse gas emissions of 6 million tons of carbon dioxide equivalent by 2030. This is part of Governor Jared Polis's plan to cut transportation emissions to 40% below 2005 levels by 2030.

In 2019, Shoshana Lew assumed leadership of CDOT. Under her leadership, the Colorado Transportation Commission approved a policy designed to stop any increases in greenhouse gas emissions from transportation in Colorado, by requiring transportation planners to calculate any emissions associated with a project and mitigate accordingly. The policy was approved by the State Transportation Commission on a 10-1 vote. Apart from environmental benefits, this policy could deliver $40 billion in economic benefits, including fewer traffic collisions.

Under this policy, the governor-appointed Colorado Transportation Commission would have authority to restrict funding for use only on climate-friendly transportation projects if the CDOT or a regional planning authority fails to meet its emissions reduction target. Lew stated that this policy allows for capacity increases, but that major projects would require offsets in the form of climate-friendly additions. Examples include the Bustang and Flatiron Flyer bus systems that serve Colorado communities. The transportation commission would also have the authority to grant waivers to this policy. Lew stated this policy enables Colorado to "lead by example" in reducing emissions, in the face of increasing impacts of climate change. The policy has received nationwide plaudits for "showing us how to end America's addiction to highway expansion". However, it also received criticism for some who were concerned that the CDOT had become "preoccupied with cleaning the air."

== Services ==
=== Highways ===
CDOT maintains the state highways in Colorado. The main arteries include Interstate 25, Interstate 70, and Interstate 76. It takes information from the Colorado Avalanche Information Center to ensure safety in winter months.

=== Bus ===
The Colorado Department of Transportation operates the Bustang as an intercity bus service to connect the regions of Colorado to each other. It also provides support for other bus systems in the state, such as the Flatiron Flyer which connects Boulder, Colorado to Denver, which is directly operated by the Regional Transportation District.

=== Aviation ===
The Colorado Division of Aeronautics is a part of the CDOT. It was created by statute in 1988 and is responsible for the development of aviation in Colorado.

=== Rail ===
Long-distance intercity passenger rail service in Colorado is provided by Amtrak on the California Zephyr and Southwest Chief, which operate long-distance cross-country routes on east-west alignments, through central and southern Colorado respectively.

Light rail and commuter rail service in the Denver metropolitan area is provided by the Regional Transportation District, which also operates local and regional bus service. The bus and rail service is known as RTD Bus & Rail, and provides a comprehensive system of transit for that region.

There have been persistent proposals for a Front Range Passenger Rail system, but they have not been implemented as of yet. This means that there is no rail service connecting the state's major population centers.

In addition, the following Heritage railways operate within Colorado.

- Cumbres and Toltec Scenic Railroad
- Cripple Creek and Victor Narrow Gauge Railroad
- Durango and Silverton Narrow Gauge Railroad
- Georgetown Loop Railroad
- Rio Grande Scenic Railroad

== See also ==
- Department of transportation
- History of Colorado
