= Wendy Sherman =

American diplomat (born 1949)

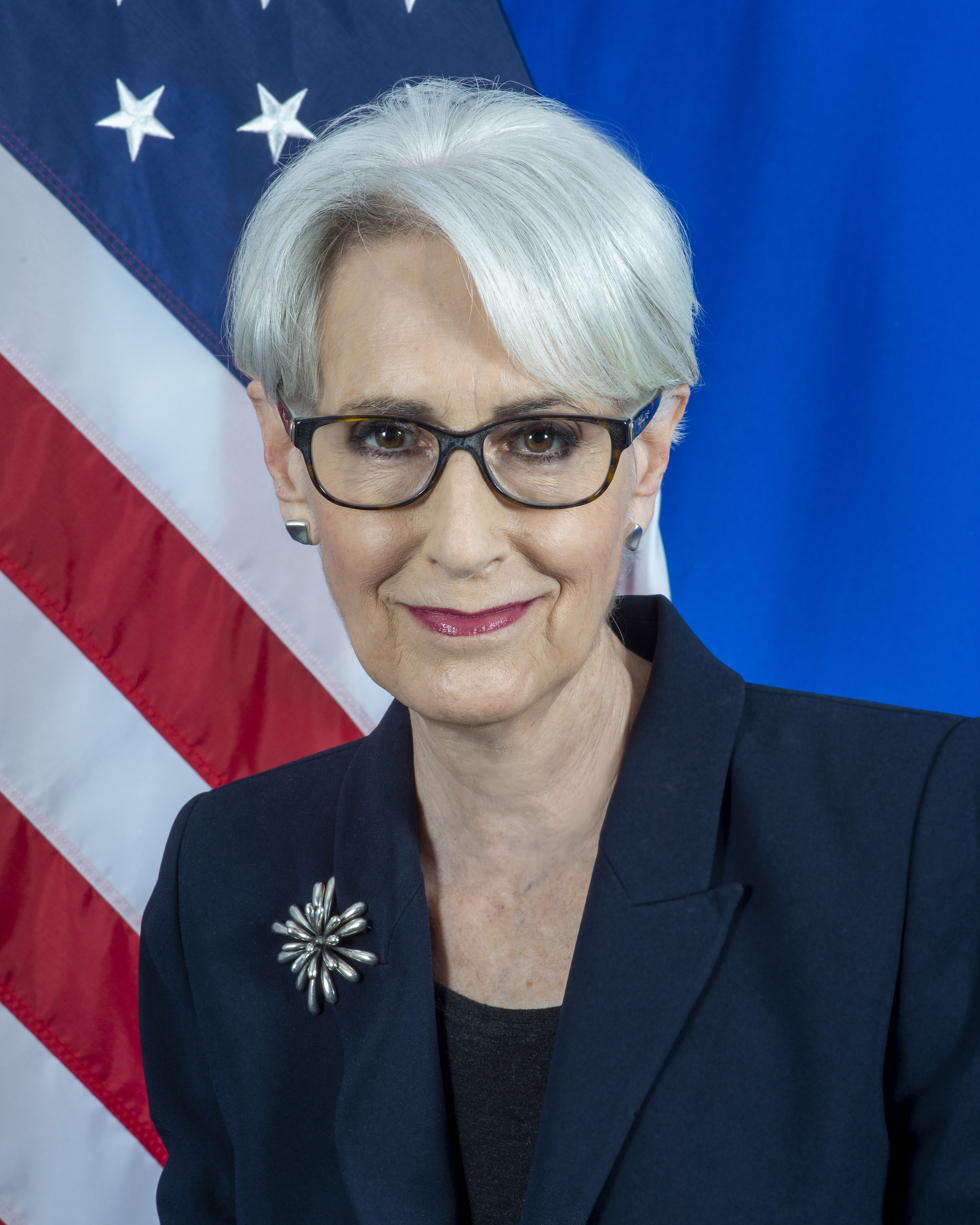
- Official portrait, 2021

21st United States Deputy Secretary of State
- In office April 14, 2021 – July 28, 2023
- President: Joe Biden
- Secretary: Antony Blinken
- Preceded by: Stephen Biegun
- Succeeded by: Victoria Nuland (acting); Kurt M. Campbell
- Acting; November 3, 2014 – January 9, 2015
- President: Barack Obama
- Preceded by: William J. Burns
- Succeeded by: Antony Blinken

21st Under Secretary of State for Political Affairs
- In office September 21, 2011 – October 2, 2015
- President: Barack Obama
- Secretary: Hillary Clinton; John Kerry
- Preceded by: William J. Burns
- Succeeded by: Thomas A. Shannon Jr.

26th Counselor of the United States Department of State
- In office August 6, 1997 – January 20, 2001
- President: Bill Clinton
- Preceded by: Tim Wirth
- Succeeded by: Philip D. Zelikow

23rd Assistant Secretary of State for Legislative Affairs
- In office May 12, 1993 – March 29, 1996
- President: Bill Clinton
- Preceded by: Janet G. Mullins Grissom
- Succeeded by: Barbara Larkin

Personal details
- Born: Wendy Ruth Sherman; June 7, 1949 (age 77) Baltimore, Maryland, U.S.
- Party: Democratic
- Spouse: Bruce Stokes
- Children: 1
- Education: Smith College; Boston University (BA); University of Maryland, Baltimore (MSW)

Wendy Ruth Sherman (born June 7, 1949) is an American diplomat who served as the United States deputy secretary of state from April 2021 to July 2023. She was a professor of the practice of public leadership and director of the Center for Public Leadership at the Harvard Kennedy School, a senior counselor at Albright Stonebridge Group, and a senior fellow at the Belfer Center for Science and International Affairs.

Sherman, a social worker, served as the director of EMILY's List, the director of Maryland's office of child welfare, and the founding president of the Fannie Mae Foundation. During the Clinton administration, she served as counselor of the United States Department of State from 1997 to 2001. She was also a special advisor to President Bill Clinton and Secretary of State Madeleine Albright and the North Korea policy coordinator. In the latter role, she was instrumental in negotiations related to North Korea's nuclear weapon and ballistic missile programs.

Sherman served under Hillary Clinton and John Kerry as under secretary of state for political affairs from 2011 to 2015. She was the fourth-ranking official in the U.S. Department of State. In that role, Sherman was the lead negotiator for the Iran nuclear deal. After winning the 2020 presidential election, Joe Biden nominated Sherman to serve as United States Deputy Secretary of State, under Antony Blinken.

== Early life and education ==
Sherman was born in Baltimore, Maryland. Her father, Malcolm Sherman, a veteran of the U.S. Marines, was originally from Philadelphia. While she was in elementary school, her family moved to Pikesville, Maryland, and Sherman attended Pikesville High School. Sherman attended Smith College from 1967 to 1969, and graduated from Boston University in 1971 in the field of sociology and urban studies. In 1976, she earned a master's degree in social work from the University of Maryland.

== Career ==
=== Early career ===
Sherman, a social worker, began her career working to help women who had been abused and people in poverty. She credits her skills in negotiations to her social work experience and education saying: "For me that core set of skills was in community organizing and clinical skills and I only half joke that those clinical skills have been very effective with both dictators and members of Congress ... it does help to understand interpersonal relations and how people think and feel and have different sets of interests."

As part of the neighborhood movement, she worked as a social activist, alongside activists like Geno Baroni and Arthur Naparstek on problems related to low-income housing.

Sherman's early jobs were in partisan politics and social work. These included working as the director of EMILY's List, which provides money to pro-choice, female, Democratic political candidates. She also worked as director of Maryland's office of child welfare and as the president and CEO of the Fannie Mae Foundation, an arm of Fannie Mae.

==== North Korea nuclear negotiations ====
Wendy Sherman was the Clinton administration's policy coordinator for North Korea. The Clinton Administration had first arrived at the 1994 Agreed Framework under which North Korea agreed to freeze and dismantle its nuclear weapons program, including its main reactor at Yongbyon (Sherman continues to defend the 1994 deal and her involvement in it, stating that "during the Clinton administration not one ounce of plutonium was added to the North Korean stockpile"). Sherman later headed North Korean negotiation policy until 2001. In 2001, following years of secret negotiations with Kim Jong Il, North Korea had promised not to produce, test or deploy missiles with a range of more than 300 miles. That offer would prevent North Korea from fielding missiles that could strike the United States. North Korea also offered to halt the sale of missiles, missile components, technology and training.

In 2001, in a New York Times op-ed, Sherman recommended that the only way the US deal could deal with North Korea's disputed programs and prevent them achieving a nuclear capability was through diplomacy, writing that Kim Jong Il now "appears ready to make landmark commitments."

In 1999, James Baker criticized her team's negotiating strategy with North Korea as "appeasement" that was rewarding the North Korean regime for minimal concessions, and he said that as a result they would fail to prevent their nuclear program. In 2011, John Bolton said that Wendy Sherman had been central in forming a policy on North Korea that was "nothing less than appeasement."

=== Private sector, political, think-tank career ===
She has been a vice chair of Albright Stonebridge Group, Albright's international strategic consulting firm, since the group's formation in 2009. She advised Hillary Clinton during the 2008 presidential campaign, and she served with Thomas Donilon as an agency review lead for the State Department in the Obama presidential transition.

In 2015 she was named as one of The Forward 50.

Sherman also sits on the Atlantic Council's board of directors.

==== Fannie Mae ====
From April 1996, Sherman became founding president and CEO of the newly created Fannie Mae Foundation, which was developed by Fannie Mae and endowed with $350 million in Fannie stock, with the goal of promoting home ownership and mortgages across wider sectors of American society. She has also been a member of the operating committee of Fannie Mae. At Fannie Mae, she set in place the groundwork for the newly recreated foundation.

In 1996, she described her mission as the first president of the Fannie Mae Foundation:

In other words, it is broadly reaching out to American citizens and saying to them: "You can have access to affordable housing. You might be able to get started on the path to homeownership, and we can at least give you some information that might help you get on your way."

In addition, two other programs came over. One is the New Americans Program, which is an effort to reach out to new citizens and immigrants to this country, because it was found in some research done in 1995 by Fannie Mae that immigrants who are renters are three times more likely to become homeowners than are other renters – because part of the American dream is to become a citizen and own your home.

The last piece is an initiative trying to end some of the discriminatory practices in the mortgage lending business. We have a beginning of a program, where we are going to work with community colleges and other partnerships to help folks take courses and get into the mortgage lending business, so that the people who sit across the table – they become loan officers – may look a little bit more like you, might understand your culture and your values.

=== Under secretary of state for political affairs (2011–2015) ===
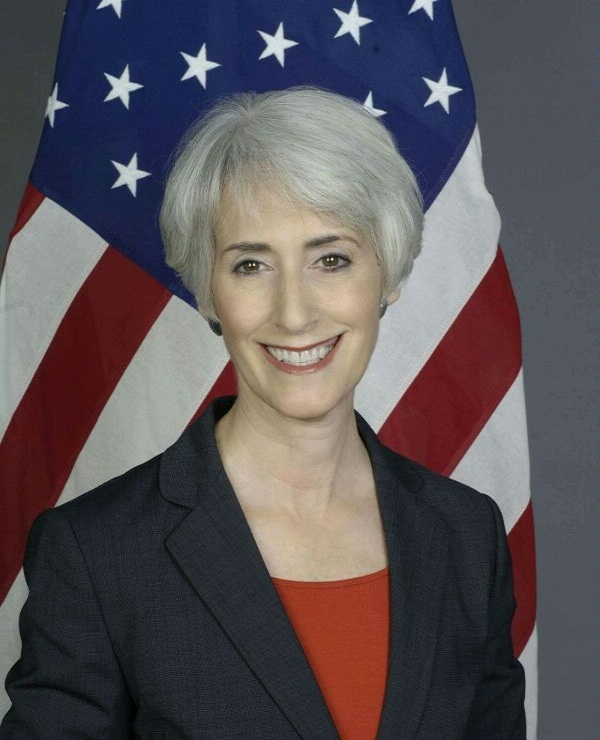
Sherman as under secretary of state for political affairs

On September 21, 2011, she was appointed to the position of under secretary of state for political affairs by Secretary Hillary Clinton. In this capacity, Sherman led the US team during six negotiating rounds between Iran and six world powers about Tehran's nuclear program and was the fourth-highest-ranking member of the department.

She was named part of a special task force by Secretary of State Hillary Clinton to implement recommendations to improve protections for foreign service personnel, as a result of the 2012 Benghazi attack.

Sherman was critical of Benjamin Netanyahu's step back from a two-state solution, suggesting it could impact the United States' veto policy surrounding related resolutions at the United Nations.

She was criticized by human rights organizations, including Amnesty International for praising Ethiopia for "strengthening its democracy" in wake of the 2015 elections - citing democratic backsliding and suppression of human rights.

She played a role in negotiating the details behind the Syria peace talks of 2016.

==== Chief nuclear negotiator with Iran ====
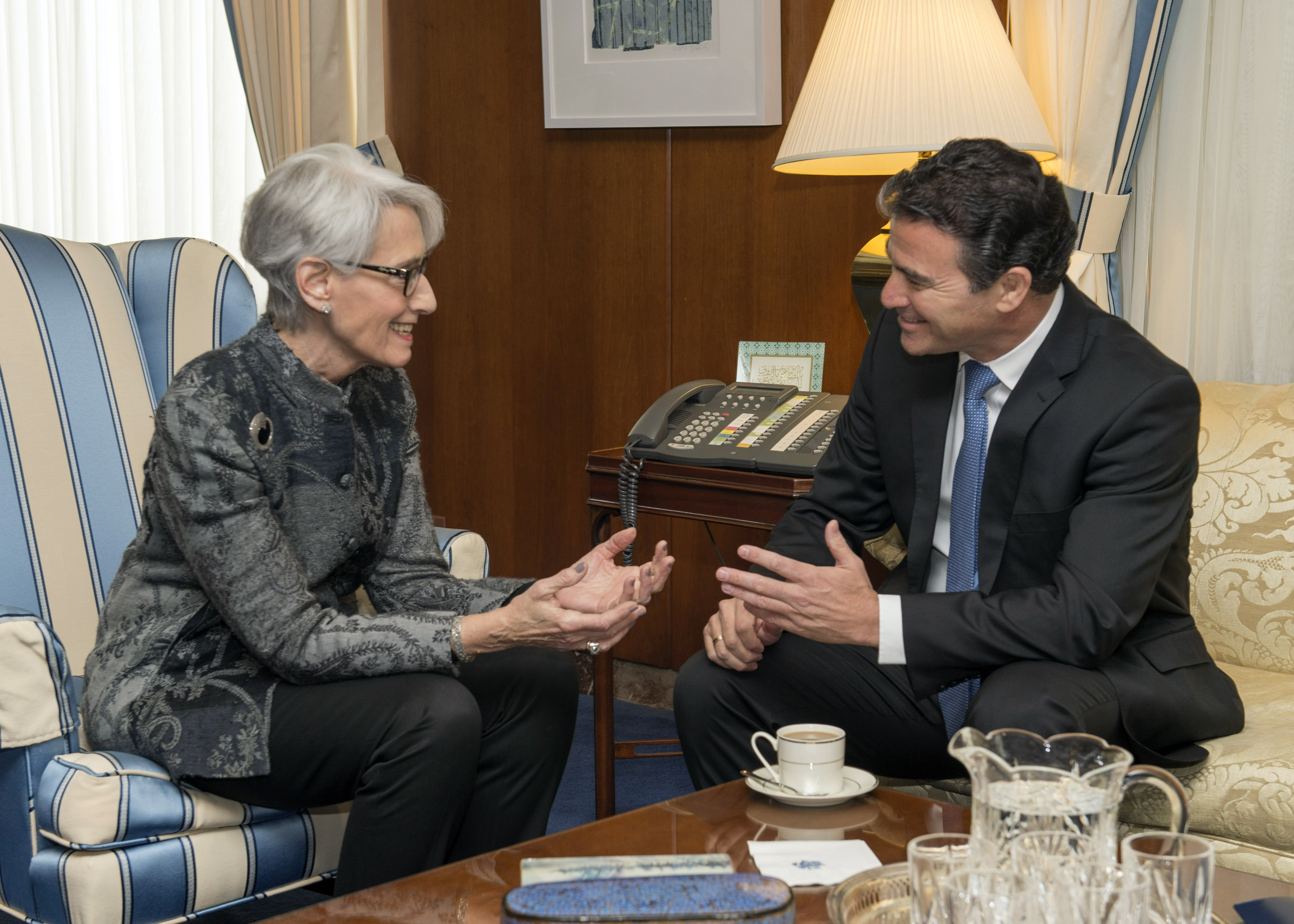
Under Secretary Sherman meets with Yossi Cohen, national security advisor to the prime minister of Israel, at the U.S. Department of State in Washington, D.C., on February 18, 2015.

In October 2013, before negotiations began in Geneva between Iran and the so-called "P5+1," she made a comment about the Iranian negotiating strategy in a Senate committee hearing. She said, "We know that deception is part of the DNA." This caused her some trouble when a number of Iranian officials, including some members of the country's parliament, asked her to apologize. She served as the lead negotiator for the United States in the agreement reached with Iran on July 14, 2015, in Vienna.

==== Remarks on East Asia ====
On February 27, 2015, Sherman told a conference at Carnegie Endowment for International Peace "The Koreans and Chinese have quarreled with Tokyo over so-called comfort women from World War II. There are disagreements about the content of history books and even the names given to various bodies of water. All this is understandable, but it can also be frustrating." She continued, "Of course, nationalist feelings can still be exploited, and it's not hard for a political leader anywhere to earn cheap applause by vilifying a former enemy. But such provocations produce paralysis, not progress." Her comments were condemned by South Korea, but an analyst at the Asan Institute for Policy Studies said the reaction to Ms. Sherman's remarks seemed excessive, and that her comments were in line with US policy.

=== Deputy secretary of state (2021–2023) ===
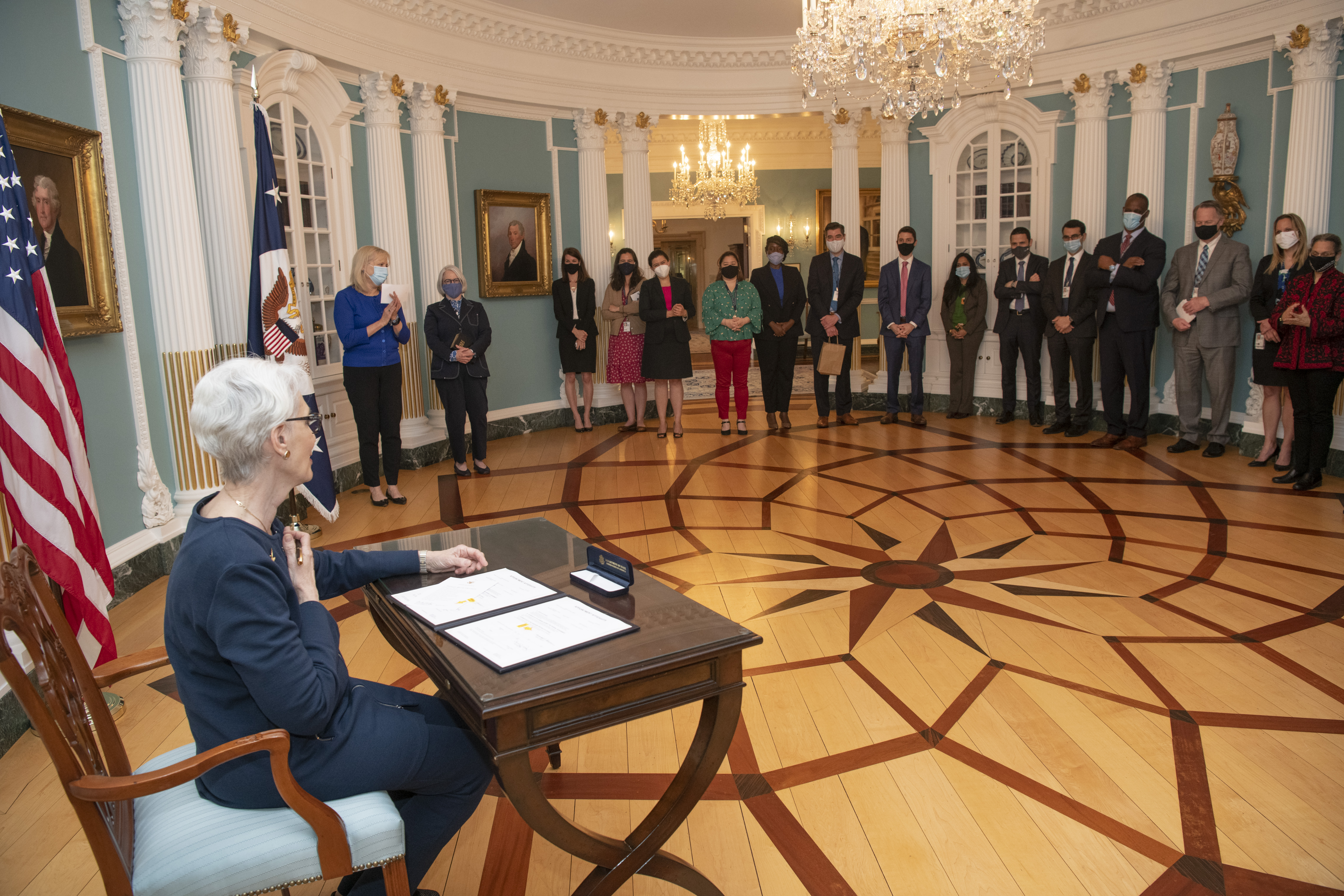
Sherman signs her appointment papers to become the deputy secretary of state.

On January 16, 2021, President-elect Joe Biden formally nominated Sherman to serve as deputy secretary of state under Antony Blinken. On March 11, 2021, her nomination was reported out of the Senate Foreign Relations Committee. Her nomination was approved by the full Senate on April 13, 2021, by a vote of 56 to 42. She is the first woman to hold the position. She was sworn into office on April 14, 2021.

In December 2021, The Washington Post reported that Sherman lobbied to water down the language of the Uyghur Forced Labor Prevention Act.

In May 2023, Reuters reported that Sherman did not support stricter export control rules on Huawei and wished to revive Blinken's canceled visit to China following the 2023 Chinese balloon incident. The same month, CNN reported that Sherman was expected to leave her post in summer 2023. Sherman retired on July 28, 2023.

=== Post-Biden administration ===
In April 2026, during an interview with Bloomberg News on The Mishal Husain Show, Sherman accused Benjamin Netanyahu of being responsible for the perpetrating the genocide in Gaza, causing destabilization in the Middle East, while also emphasized the United States' duty to protect Israel and as close allies. She also said she didn't know if it was a literal genocide.

== Personal life ==
Sherman is married to Bruce Stokes, a former journalist and director for Global Economic Attitudes at the Pew Research Center. They first met in 1978 for a discussion about low-income housing. They have a daughter.

== Publications ==
=== Books ===
- Not for the Faint of Heart: Lessons in Courage, Power and Persistence, PublicAffairs, September 2018

=== Articles ===
- How We Got the Iran Deal, Foreign Affairs, August 14, 2018

== Honours ==
- Grand Cordon of the Order of the Rising Sun (2024)

Political offices
Preceded by Janet G. Mullins Grissom	Assistant Secretary of State for Legislative Affairs; 1993–1996	Succeeded by Barbara Larkin
Preceded by Tim Wirth	Counselor of the United States Department of State; 1997–2001	Succeeded by Philip D. Zelikow
Preceded by Thomas A. Shannon Jr. Acting	Under Secretary of State for Political Affairs; 2011–2015	Succeeded by Thomas A. Shannon Jr.
Preceded by William J. Burns	United States Deputy Secretary of State; Acting; 2014–2015	Succeeded by Antony Blinken
Preceded by Stephen Biegun	United States Deputy Secretary of State; 2021–2023	Succeeded by Victoria Nuland; Acting
