= Life After Cars =

2025 non-fiction book by Sarah Goodyear, Doug Gordon, and Aaron Naparstek

Life After Cars: Freeing Ourselves from the Tyranny of the Automobile
- Author: Sarah Goodyear; Doug Gordon; Aaron Naparstek
- Language: English
- Subject: Cars, Transportation planning, Urban planning
- Publisher: Thesis
- Publication date: October 21, 2025
- ISBN: 978-0593850725
- Website: www.lifeaftercars.com

Life After Cars: Freeing Ourselves from the Tyranny of the Automobile is a 2025 non-fiction book written by Sarah Goodyear, Doug Gordon, and Aaron Naparstek. This book argues that automobile dependence has imposed major social, environmental, and political costs and advocates the use of tactical urbanism and reforms such as reducing parking minimums and expanding bus and bicycle infrastructure. Prior to this book, the trio started co-hosting The War on Cars podcast, which has more than 170 episodes. Goodyear and Gordon continue to host the podcast. The 304-page book was published by Thesis, an imprint of Penguin Random House, on October 21, 2025, and is also available as an audiobook narrated by Goodyear and Gordon.

== Reception ==
Upon publication, Life After Cars entered the USA Today bestseller list at number 85. Publishers Weekly called it an incisive account, while Kirkus Reviews described it as offering sensible solutions for taking back streets from automobiles. The New Republic said, "The authors marshal a compelling blend of history, statistics, and anecdote in support of a quietly radical argument: that mass car ownership, far from natural and inevitable, is a historical blip that can and should be reversed." The Portland Mercury said, "Those new to thinking about the automobile’s reign of terror on society might bristle at the book’s explicitly anti-car message, but the authors aren’t throwing around assertions they can’t back up. By covering a range of topics in one volume, Life After Cars provides openings for new people to enlist in the (proverbial) war on cars."
