= Kristie Kenney =

American diplomat (born 1955)

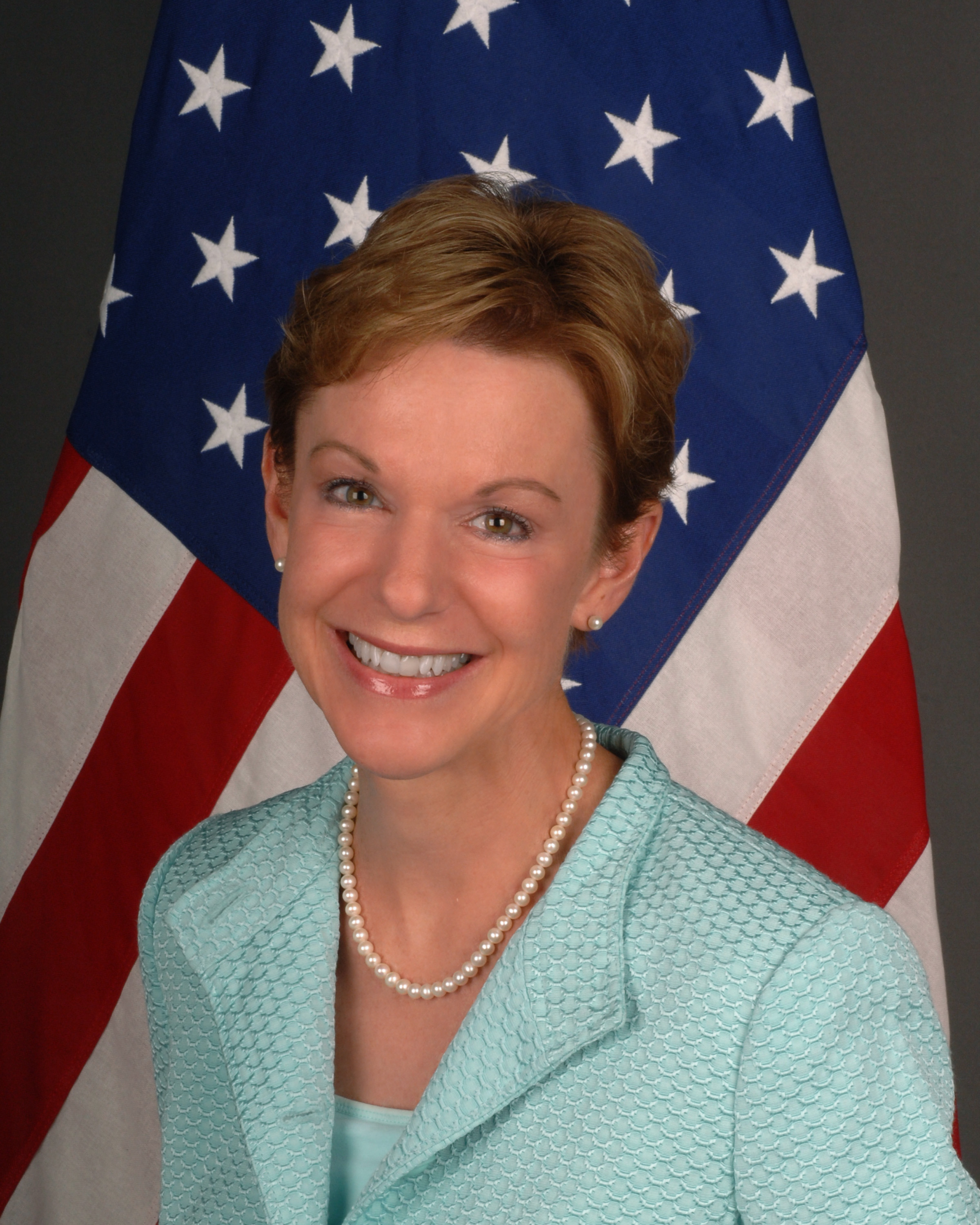

32nd Counselor of the United States Department of State
- In office February 12, 2016 – February 17, 2017
- President: Barack Obama; Donald Trump
- Preceded by: Thomas A. Shannon Jr.
- Succeeded by: Maliz E. Beams

United States Ambassador to Thailand
- In office January 19, 2011 – November 6, 2014
- President: Barack Obama
- Preceded by: Eric G. John
- Succeeded by: Glyn T. Davies

United States Ambassador to the Philippines
- In office March 22, 2006 – July 28, 2009
- President: George W. Bush; Barack Obama
- Preceded by: Francis J. Ricciardone Jr.
- Succeeded by: Harry K. Thomas Jr.

United States Ambassador to Ecuador
- In office September 25, 2002 – July 6, 2005
- President: George W. Bush
- Preceded by: Gwen C. Clare
- Succeeded by: Linda Jewell

18th Executive Secretary of the United States Department of State
- In office March 2, 1998 – April 30, 2001
- President: Bill Clinton; George W. Bush
- Preceded by: William J. Burns
- Succeeded by: Maura A. Harty

Personal details
- Born: Kristie Anne Kenney; May 24, 1955 (age 71) Washington, D.C., U.S.
- Spouse: William Brownfield
- Education: Clemson University; Tulane University

Kristie Anne Kenney (born May 24, 1955) is an American former senior diplomat who served as the 32nd Counselor of the United States Department of State from 2016 to 2017. She is a recipient of the Secretary of State's Distinguished Service Award and held the nation's highest diplomatic rank of Career Ambassador in the United States Foreign Service. She served as the Department of State Transition Coordinator for the 2016–17 transition.

Ambassador Kenney previously served as the United States Ambassador to the Republic of Ecuador, as United States Ambassador to the Philippines, and most recently as United States Ambassador to Thailand. She was the first female U.S. ambassador to the latter two countries. Kenney holds a master's degree in Latin American studies from Tulane University and a bachelor's degree in political science from Clemson University.

== Diplomatic career ==
U.S. Secretary of State John Kerry appointed Ambassador Kenney as Counselor of the State Department on February 12, 2016. In this role, Ambassador Kenney "provides strategic guidance to the Secretary on foreign policy, undertakes efforts to enhance U.S. diplomacy and public outreach, and conducts special diplomatic assignments as directed by the Secretary."

In July 2010, President Barack Obama nominated Kenney as the United States ambassador to the Kingdom of Thailand. She was confirmed by the United States Senate on September 29, 2010.

Prior to being the U.S. ambassador to Thailand, Kenney served as the U.S. ambassador to Ecuador and the Philippines. Before working for the United States Foreign Service, she worked in United States Senate, a tour guide in the United States Capitol, an intern in the House of Representatives, and as a staff member of the Senate Human Resources Committee.

At the State Department, she was appointed overseas as economic counselor at the United States Mission to International Organizations in Geneva, economic officer at the U.S. Embassy in Argentina, and consular officer at the U.S. embassy in Jamaica. Back home, she was appointed as director of the State Department Operations Center, a detail to the White House as a member of the National Security Council staff, and political-military officer in the Office of NATO Affairs.

Kenney served as Executive Secretary of the State Department before becoming senior advisor to the assistant secretary for International Narcotics and Law Enforcement. She worked for both Secretaries of State Madeleine Albright and Colin Powell and led the State Department's transition team from the Clinton to George W. Bush administration.

Kenney announced her retirement from the State Department in April 2017.

== Counselor of the State Department ==
As Counselor, she provided strategic advice to Secretary of State John Kerry, and took on special assignments on foreign policy and on improving the State Department.

In January 2016, she became the first high-level diplomatic visitor to Argentina and Uruguay in many years, following the 2015 elections in Argentina, among other overseas trips on behalf of the Secretary. She made similar early visits to engage new governments and leaders in Myanmar, the Philippines, Peru, and Panama.

In addition to policy outreach, she has focused on reaching out to women and minority groups to encourage interest in public service careers. She has undertaken domestic travel, including to discuss careers in public service with young Americans.

She launched the State Department's first podcast, "Conversations on Leadership," which "gives a behind the scenes insights from Department leaders" and "offer a window into various thought and decision-making processes."

In advance of the 2016 U.S. presidential election, Kenney was designated by Secretary Kerry as the lead Transition Coordinator for the State Department. In this role, she represented the State Department on the White House's Agency Transition Directors Council (ATDC) to ensure the federal government and the State Department implemented a transition from the Obama administration to the Trump administration that was smooth, well-managed, and efficient. She was retained in her position for an extra month by the Trump administration to help manage the arrival of Secretary Rex Tillerson and his team.

In January 2017, she was awarded the Distinguished Service Award by Secretary Kerry "in recognition of exceptionally outstanding leadership, professional competence, and significant accomplishment over a sustained period of time in the field of foreign affairs".

== First woman ambassador to the Kingdom of Thailand ==
Kenney was confirmed by the U.S. Senate as the first female U.S. Ambassador to Thailand on September 29, 2010. In her confirmation testimony before the Senate, Kenney noted the long U.S.-Thai treaty alliance "based on a common set of values that define our two peoples" and noted that the relationship "provides important benefits to both countries in health, security, trade and investment, in law enforcement cooperation, and in humanitarian assistance to refugees.

As Ambassador to Thailand, Kenney managed the bilateral relationship and led a large U.S. Mission during the consequential 2011 Thai elections, historic 2011 Thai floods, and the 2014 Thai coup.

Kenney was known in Thailand for her active use of social media for official and personal diplomacy and use of Thai language for social media messages and videos. The Thai public reacted positively, with her outreach called a "charm offensive" and resulting in a great deal of social engagement with the U.S. Embassy. In 2011, she was awarded the National Thai Language Day award by the prime minister for her high-profile use of the Thai language.

== First woman U.S. ambassador to the Philippines ==
Kenney was nominated by U.S. President George W. Bush on November 3, 2005, to succeed Francis J. Ricciardone Jr. She was confirmed by the United States Senate on February 16, 2006, and was sworn into office by Secretary Condoleezza Rice on March 6, 2006. Kenney arrived in the Philippines on March 17 and submitted her credentials to Philippine President Gloria Macapagal Arroyo on March 22.

Following the 2007 Manila Peninsula rebellion, Kenney voiced support for Arroyo, a key Bush ally in the Southeast Asian theatre of the U.S.-led war on terror. She congratulated Philippine authorities for their quick action that led to the arrest of suspects behind the 2007 Batasang Pambansa bombing, and she praised the Metropolitan Manila Development Authority for keeping the capital clean and orderly.

Regarding the question of U.S. bases, she said: "We are not building any bases in the Philippines, we don't have any plans to have bases, and we don't need any bases." On December 4, 2007, Kristie Kenney turned over seven Navy utility boats and two Boston whalers to the Philippine Navy in ceremonies held at its headquarters along Roxas Boulevard, City of Manila.

Also, Kenney and World Bank country director for the Philippines Bert Hoffman signed the grant agreement of US$750,000 (±₱32mn) at the International Finance Corporation offices in Makati, for the Bangsang Moro Mindanao Trust Fund agency. She earlier announced a US$3mn grant to the Philippines to help promote family planning in the workplace and American donation of US$38,000 for the preservation of Banaue Rice Terraces.

On November 19, 2009, U.S. President Barack Obama designated Harry K. Thomas Jr. to replace Kenney. Philippine media reported that Kenney, widely known to have become fond of her post, felt "heartbroken" at the thought of leaving it, quoting her Facebook status update, which reportedly read:

Heart broken to think of leaving the Philippines but know it is time for me to plan to return to be with my family. Calling on my FB friends to help me not be sad but to enjoy and savor my remaining months in this lovely country.

== Personal life ==
Ambassador Kenney is married to former Assistant Secretary of State William Brownfield, who is also a Career Ambassador. She speaks both Spanish and French. She grew up in the suburbs of Washington, D.C., and obtained a bachelor's degree from Clemson University and a master's degree from Tulane University in New Orleans. She also attended the National War College in Washington, D.C.

Political offices
Preceded by William J. Burns	Executive Secretary of the United States Department of State; 1998–2001	Succeeded by Maura A. Harty
Preceded by Thomas A. Shannon Jr.	Counselor of the United States Department of State; 2016–2017	Succeeded by Maliz E. Beams
Diplomatic posts
Preceded by Gwen C. Clare	United States Ambassador to Ecuador; 2002–2005	Succeeded by Linda Jewell
Preceded by Darryl N. Johnson	United States Ambassador to the Philippines; 2006–2009	Succeeded by Harry K. Thomas Jr.
Preceded by Eric G. John	United States Ambassador to Thailand; 2011–2014	Succeeded by Glyn T. Davies
