= Ulrich Brechbuhl =

Swiss-American businessman and government official (born 1964)

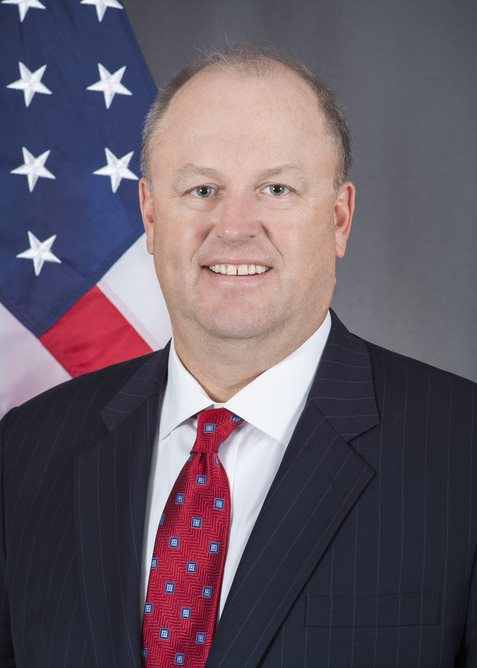

34th Counselor of the United States Department of State
- In office May 1, 2018 – January 20, 2021
- President: Donald Trump
- Preceded by: Maliz E. Beams
- Succeeded by: Derek Chollet

Under Secretary of State for Public Diplomacy and Public Affairs
- Acting
- In office March 3, 2020 – September 28, 2020
- President: Donald Trump
- Preceded by: Michelle Giuda (Acting)
- Succeeded by: Nilda Pedrosa (Acting)

Personal details
- Born: Thomas Ulrich Brechbühl; January 19, 1964 (age 62) Bern, Switzerland
- Citizenship: United States; Switzerland
- Spouse: Michelle Van Duyn (m. 1998)
- Children: 3
- Education: United States Military Academy (BS); Harvard University (MBA)

Military service
- Allegiance: United States
- Branch/service: United States Army
- Years of service: 1986–1992
- Rank: Captain
- Unit: 2nd Armored Cavalry Regiment; 1st Cavalry Division
- Battles/wars: Persian Gulf War

Thomas Ulrich Brechbuhl (/ˈbrɛç.bʏl/; BREKH-buehl born January 19, 1964) is a Swiss-American businessman and former government official, having held the position of Counselor of the United States Department of State from May 1, 2018, to January 20, 2021. He was appointed by and reported to Secretary of State Mike Pompeo, and replaced Maliz E. Beams. Along with the role of Counselor, he was the Acting Under Secretary for Public Diplomacy and Public Affairs at the Department of State from March to September 2020.

== Early life and education ==
Brechbuhl was born January 19, 1964 in Bern, Switzerland, the second of four children, to Hans-Rudolf "Hansruedi" Brechbuhl (died 1981), a banker, and Getrude "Trudi" Brechbuhl (née Bosshart; 1929–2023), who later worked for the Waldorf Schools. His parents originally hailed from Bern and St. Gallen. He has three siblings; Hans-Christian Brechbuhl, Anna Barbara Brechbuhl and David Brechbuhl.

In 1963, his parents returned to eastern Switzerland, for a brief 18-months stay, before returning to the United States. Brechbuhl ultimately was raised in Garden City, New York. He attended the Waldorf School of Garden City through 12th grade, and was president of the student council his senior year.

He graduated from the United States Military Academy at West Point in 1986. His college yearbook describes him as a "hardworking and disciplined" student, a member of the Chapel Choir, Scoutmaster's Council, French Club, and the Lacrosse team. He was a classmate of Brian Bulatao and Mike Pompeo and later helped Pompeo found Thayer Aerospace. After leaving military service he completed his Master of Business Administration at the Harvard Business School in 1994.

== Career ==
Following his graduation from West Point, Brechbuhl was stationed in Europe as an officer with the 2nd Armored Cavalry Regiment and during the Persian Gulf War he served with the 1st Squadron, 7th Cavalry in the U.S. Army's 1st Cavalry Division. After graduating from the Harvard Business School, he worked for Bain and Company, Inc., from 1993 until 1998. Brechbuhl joined Pompeo and two other college friends in founding Thayer Aerospace, which was partly funded by Wichita's Koch Venture Capital, Cardinal Investment Co. and Bain & Co. He was CFO. Following his role as President and CEO of Migratec, Brechbuhl was Chief Executive Officer of Chamberlin Edmonds and Associates Inc., a subsidiary of Emdeon, from 2004 until 2014.

Before becoming Counselor, Brechbuhl was president of Appenzeller Point, LLC. Prior to that, he was executive chairman of Avadyne Health.

=== State Department ===
In his role as Counselor, Brechbuhl was chartered with offering strategic guidance on foreign policy, enhancing U.S. diplomacy and conducting "special diplomatic assignments as directed by the Secretary". Brechbuhl's initial focus was to accelerate hiring to fill the many unfilled positions in the department. He was delegated "sweeping control over the nomination process, drawing up lists of candidates for jobs and purging those" likely to face too much opposition from the White House or Senate. One of Brechbuhl's initiatives was to shepherd the creation of an "ethos" statement that would help unify an understaffed department with morale issues. Brechbuhl explained the value of the ethos statement: "The ultimate value, we believe, is the team will be far more cohesive. The left hand will understand the right hand.”

In October 2019 Brechbuhl led a U.S. delegation to Greenland and Denmark that included officials from the United States National Security Council and the Pentagon with the purpose of discussing “areas of current and future cooperation”. Denmark's minister of foreign affairs, Jeppe Kofod, participated. State Department officials did note whether the trip would address President Donald Trump's earlier interest in the U.S. buying Greenland and the response of Denmark's Prime Minister Mette Frederiksen that the idea was "absurd." The U.S. has a longstanding defense agreement with Denmark giving the U.S. almost unlimited rights in Greenland at Thule Air Base, the US Armed Forces' northernmost installation.

On March 3, 2020, Brechbuhl took on the role of acting Under Secretary for Public Diplomacy and Public Affairs, as designated by Secretary of State Mike Pompeo.

Brechbuhl has been involved in a controversy regarding mistreatment of State Department employees that was ultimately investigated by Office of the Inspector General of the Department of State. Under federal human resources regulations, career employees at the State Department must be evaluated and managed on the basis of merit. Discrimination based on ethnicity, religion or perceived political beliefs is prohibited. (Political appointees, however, may be selected for their views regarding administration policy.) When an employee who had been inaccurately attacked in a conservative news outlet, her manager, political appointee Brian Hook, refused to help her clear up the inaccurate information and instead removed her from her role. The OIG noted that Brian Hook had sent an email to himself commenting on various career employees with labels such as “leaker,” “troublemaker,” and “turncoat.” While Brechbuhl disputed the report's findings related to the employee's mistreatment, stating that Hook acted appropriately in creating his own team, the OIG concluded that the career employee had been unfairly targeted by Trump administration appointees, and recommended that the State Department should discipline staff members and officials who violated non-discrimination policies. In response, Brechbuhl noted that there is now a department requirement for all political appointees to receive instruction related to required personnel policies and practices. In the meantime, a separate department, United States Office of Special Counsel, with jurisdiction over personnel matters throughout the executive branch, is undertaking its own review of the situation in question.

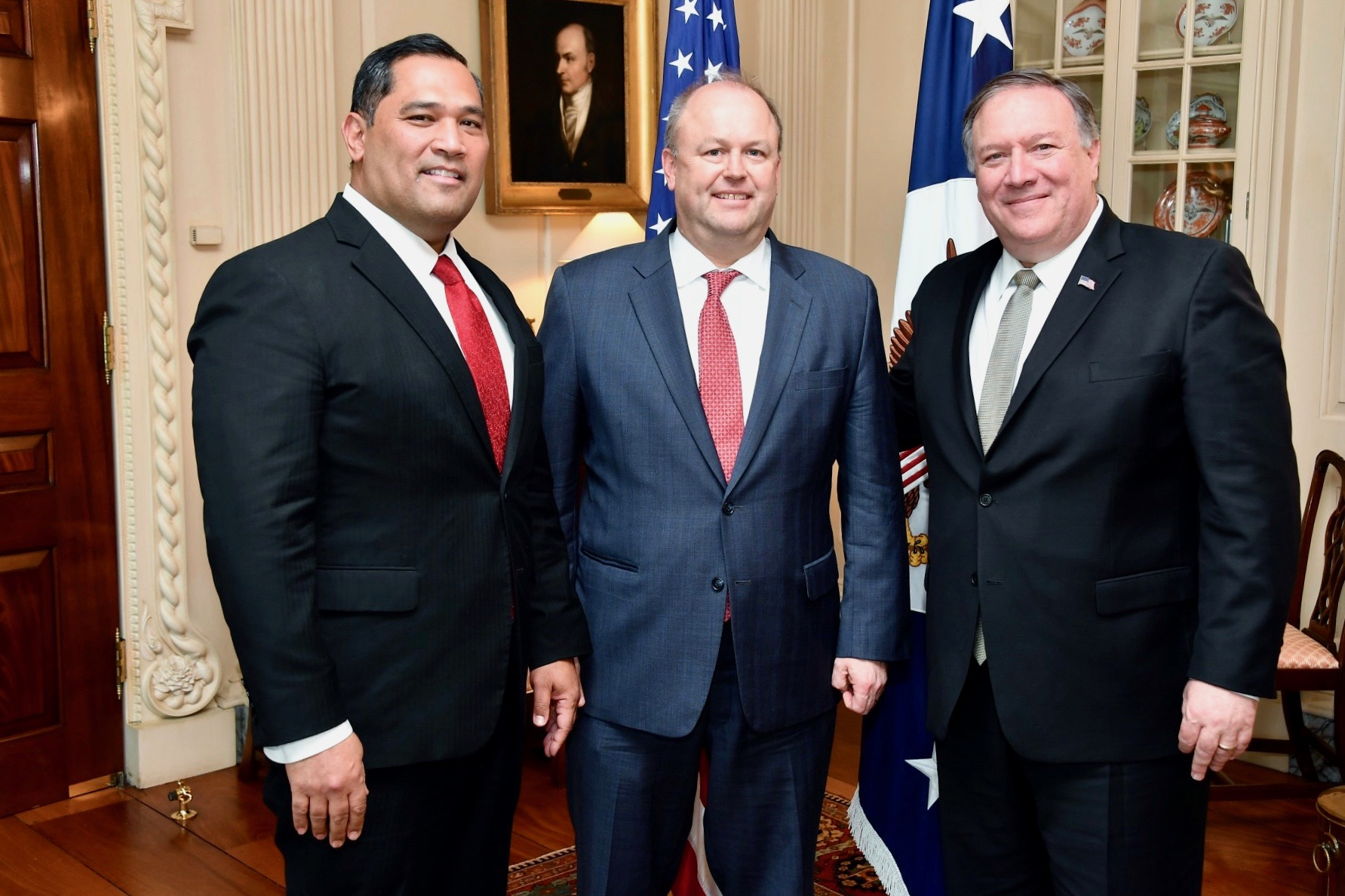
Secretary Pompeo swears in Brian Bulatao as the new Under Secretary of State for Management with Ulrich Brechbuhl looking on.

==== Ukraine controversy ====
After Ukraine's newly elected President Volodymyr Zelenskyy was unable to convince President Donald Trump or Vice President Mike Pence to attend his inauguration, Zelenskyy attended a June 4, 2019 dinner hosted by the United States Ambassador to the European Union, Gordon Sondland. They were joined by White House Advisor Jared Kushner and Ulrich Brechbuhl.

Brechbuhl was identified in a 2019 whistleblower complaint as someone who listened in on Trump's July 25, 2019, phone call with Ukrainian president Volodymyr Zelenskyy. A "former White House official said it was extremely unusual for a State Department official to be on what was supposed to be a standard congratulatory call from the president to another world leader". Subsequently, a representative of the State Department denied that Brechbuhl was on the call.

On October 2, 2019, Steve Linick, the State Department's inspector general, delivered a 40-page packet of apparent disinformation regarding former Vice President Joe Biden and former Ambassador to Ukraine, Marie Yovanovitch, to Capitol Hill. Linick told congressional aides his office questioned Brechbuhl about the origins of the packet. Brechbuhl noted the packet came to him from Pompeo, who said it "came over," and Brechbuhl reportedly presumed it was from the White House. Later that day, President Trump's attorney, Rudy Giuliani, said he passed the packet regarding Ukraine and attacks on Yovanovitch to Pompeo. "They (the State Department) told me they would investigate it," Giuliani added. Also, according to the inspector general, George P. Kent, the deputy assistant secretary of state responsible for Ukraine, became alarmed about a campaign of disinformation being waged about Ambassador Marie Yovanovitch, and alerted three state department officials, including Brechbuhl, described as a "a close confidant of Secretary of State Mike Pompeo." Philip Reeker, acting Assistant Secretary of State in the Bureau of European and Eurasian Affairs, also alerted Brechbuhl to the unfounded smear campaign surrounding Marie Yovanovitch. In an email to Ulrich Brechbuhl, Reeker described the smear as a "fake narrative" that was "really ... without merit or validation" and on other occasions forwarded to Brechbuhl information State Department officials gathered to counter the allegations. President Donald Trump nevertheless removed her prematurely from her post and referred to her as "bad news" in a conversation with the Ukrainian president.

In his public testimony on November 20, 2019 Gordon Sondland noted in his opening statement that United States Secretary of Energy Rick Perry, then U.S. Ambassador to NATO Kurt Volker and Sondland himself stayed in touch with Rudy Giuliani regarding the President expectation that a public statement should be made by President Zelenskyy committing Ukraine to look into corruption issues, and that Giuliani "specifically mentioned the 2016 election (including the DNC server) and Burisma as two topics of importance to the President." Sondland stated that they kept the leadership of the NSC and State Department informed about their activities, including Pompeo and Brechbuhl. Sondland noted that in July Bill Taylor kept Brechbuhl updated on Giuliani's problematic involvement and that nevertheless, as late as September 24, Pompeo was still telling Volker to talk with Giuliani.

Brechbuhl is one of several State Department employees connected to American policy work in Ukraine who have been scheduled to appear before congressional investigators. House impeachment investigators issued a subpoena to Brechbuhl to testify on November 6, 2019, but Brechbuhl defied the subpoena and travelled to Germany with Mike Pompeo instead.

== Personal life ==
Brechbuhl married Michelle Van Duyn in 1998. They have three sons, Hans, Jacob and Pirmin.

They reside in Atlanta, Georgia. He is an active member of several civic organizations including Greater Atlanta Christian School, Boy Scout Troop 379 and Atlanta Area Council. Brechbuhl retains Swiss-American dual citizenship.

== See also ==
- Trump–Ukraine scandal
- Impeachment inquiry against Donald Trump

Political offices
Preceded by Maliz E. Beams	Counselor of the United States Department of State; 2018–2021	Succeeded by Derek Chollet
