= Brian Bulatao =

American businessman and politician (born 1964)

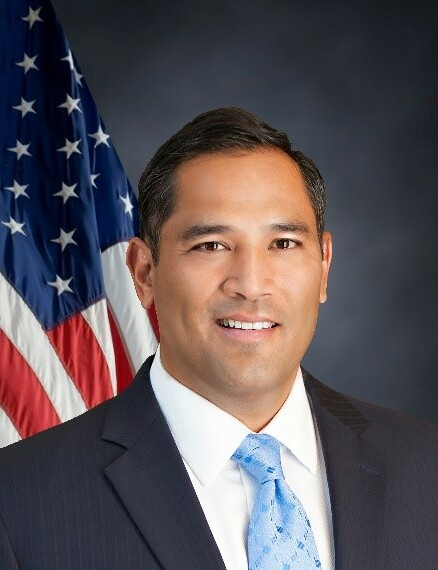

15th Under Secretary of State for Management
- In office May 17, 2019 – January 20, 2021
- President: Donald Trump
- Secretary: Mike Pompeo
- Preceded by: Patrick F. Kennedy
- Succeeded by: John R. Bass

Personal details
- Born: September 30, 1964 (age 62)
- Party: Republican
- Education: United States Military Academy (BS); Harvard University (MBA)

Military service
- Allegiance: United States
- Branch/service: United States Army
- Years of service: 1986–1993
- Rank: Captain

Brian Joseph Bulatao (born 30 September 1964) is an American businessman and former government official. In 2017, he was named chief operating officer of the Central Intelligence Agency by then-agency director Mike Pompeo. In June 2018, Bulatao was nominated to be Under Secretary of State for Management by President Donald Trump. On May 16, 2019, Bulatao was confirmed by the United States Senate in a 92–5 vote; he was sworn in the next day.

After leaving his position within the Trump administration in 2021, he was named chief administrative officer at Activision Blizzard effective March 2021.

== Early life and education ==
Bulatao was raised in Pennsylvania, one of three children of Agapito and Brenda Bulatao. His father was an immigrant from the Philippines and his mother's parents immigrated from Greece and Poland.

Bulatao graduated in 1986 from the United States Military Academy at West Point, where he rose to the rank of cadet captain, and was involved in white water canoeing, scuba diving, mountaineering and 150-lb. football. Nicknamed "Rambo," he was described in the 1986 Howitzer yearbook as a Renaissance man who earned the respect of all. He was a classmate of Ulrich Brechbuhl and Mike Pompeo and later helped Pompeo found Thayer Aerospace. Later he earned an MBA from Harvard Business School.

== Career ==
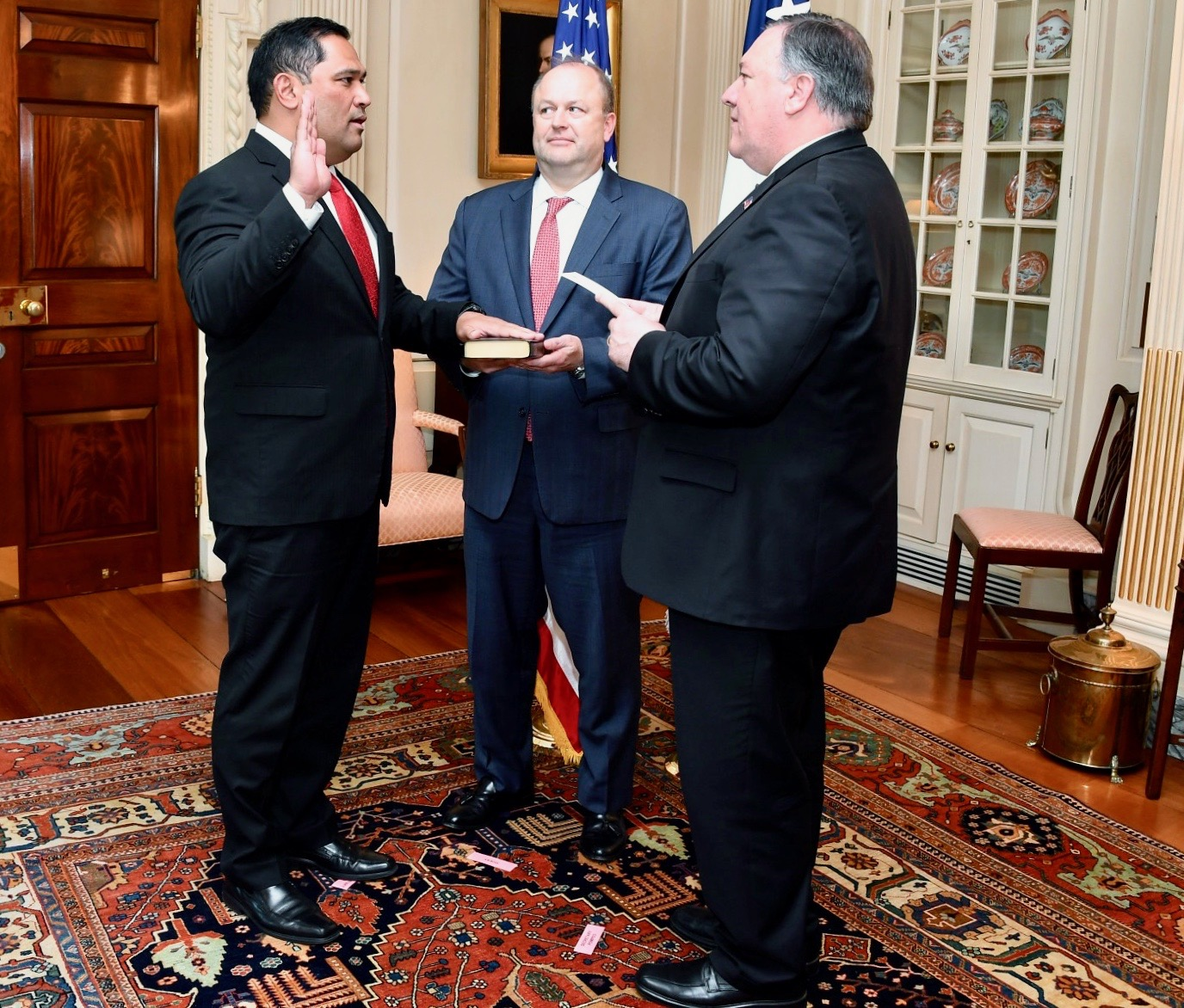
Secretary Pompeo swears in Brian Bulatao as the new Under Secretary of State for Management with Ulrich Brechbuhl looking on.

Bulatao served in the US Army from 1986 to 1993, graduating from Ranger School in that time. After his military service he worked as a consultant with McKinsey & Company. In 1997 he was one of the founders of Thayer Aerospace together with a number of other West Point graduates. Among them were his former West Point classmates Mike Pompeo and Ulrich Brechbuhl. While two of the other founders left the company a short time later, Bulatao and Pompeo remained with Thayer until 2006.

Bulatao later joined Chick Packaging Inc. as its CEO, and after the company's acquisition by Nefab A/B in 2010 he became Executive Vice President, leading the combined operations in North and South America. Later he went into private equity, finally as a senior adviser at Highlander Partners, L.P., a Dallas-based investment firm that claims more than $1 billion in assets under management.

In 2017 when Pompeo became Director of the CIA, he brought Bulatao in as a senior advisor, then named him as Chief Operation Officer, a position that earlier was named Executive Director. In this position his priorities are the streamlining of the hiring process, taking a systematic look at the alignment of strategy, staffing, funding, and other resources; making CIA's contracting process more effective and efficient; ensuring that the Agency as a whole is positioned to invest in and lead in cutting-edge technologies; and finding innovative ways to protect CIA officers' identities and operations in the digital age.

In July 2018 Bulatao was nominated for the position of Under Secretary of State for Management as the successor to Patrick F. Kennedy. In May 2019 Senator Bob Menendez lifted the almost year-long hold he had placed on the confirmation as soon as Secretary of State Mike Pompeo promised to send to the Senate documentation relating to allegations that "Trump administration political appointees at the State Department had sought to remove or reassign career employees who were seen as hostile to Trump’s agenda." During the nomination hearings, Bulatao said that if he were confirmed, he would not tolerate "political litmus tests" in the department.

In March 2021, Bulatao joined Activision Blizzard as Chief Administrative Officer and oversees the Call of Duty Endowment in addition to administrative actions including Corporate Social Responsibility activities across Activision Blizzard.

== Personal life ==
Bulatao was married and has a son and daughter.
