= Arthur Naparstek =

Dr. Arthur J. Naparstek
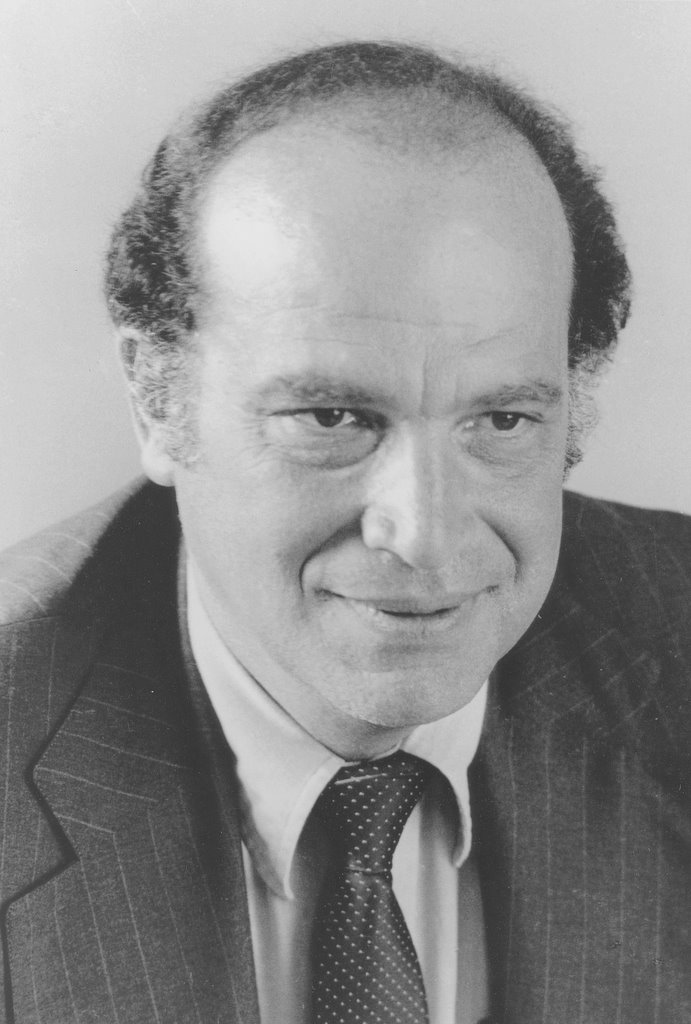

Personal details
- Born: June 1, 1938 New York City, New York
- Died: April 24, 2004 (aged 65) Cleveland, OH
- Spouse: Belleruth Naparstek
- Children: Aaron Naparstek; Keila Naparstek; Abram Naparstek
- Education: Illinois Wesleyan University (B.A.); New York University (M.A.); Brandeis University (Ph.D.)
- Profession: Social worker

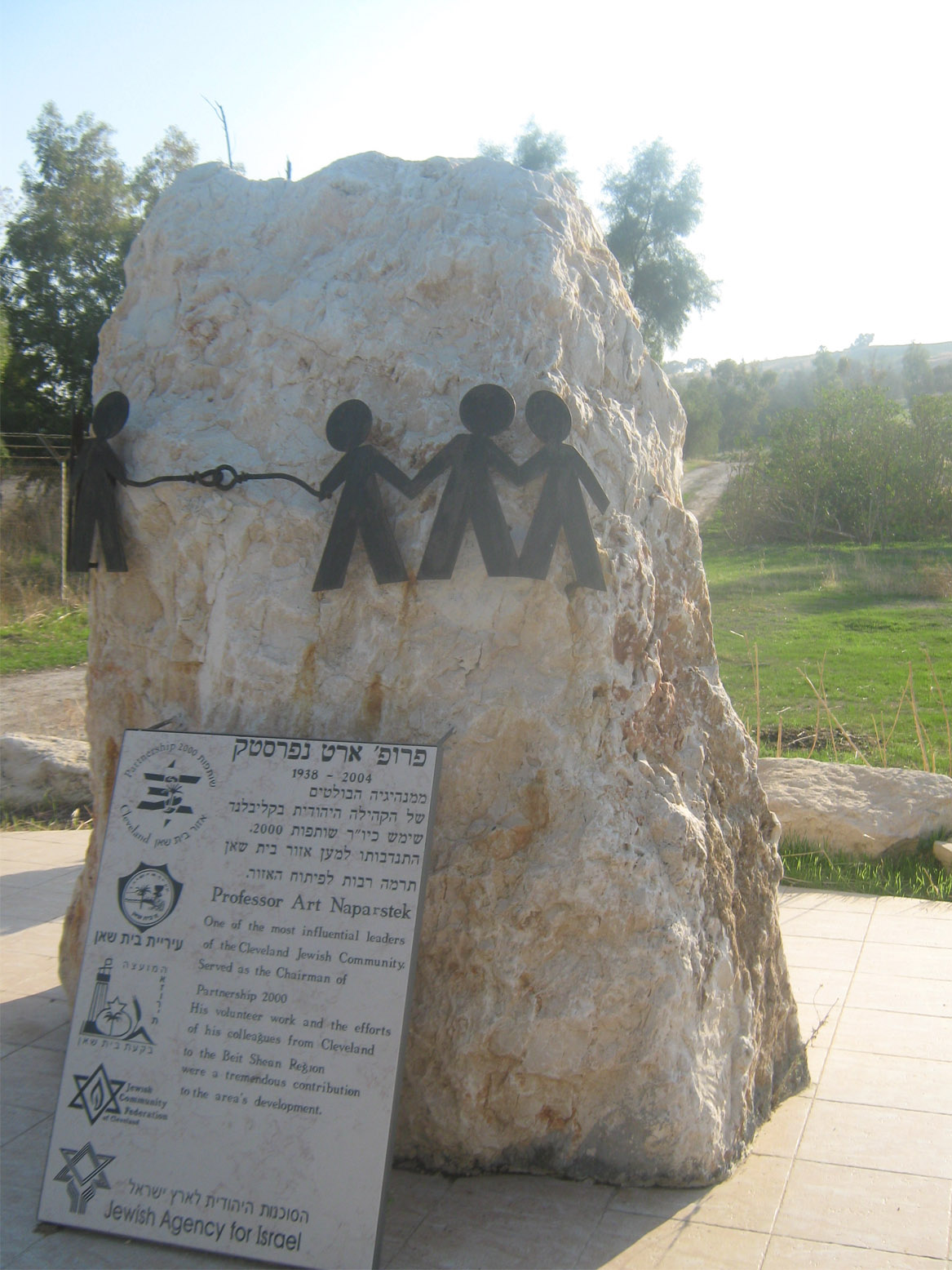
Monument to Dr. Naparstek in Bet She'an, Israel

Dr. Arthur J. Naparstek (June 1, 1938 – April 24, 2004) was a professor of social work and Dean of the Mandel School of Applied Social Sciences at Case Western Reserve University in Cleveland, Ohio. He was an expert on urban redevelopment and neighborhood revitalization whose community-building concepts served as the basis for local and national government programs in both the United States and Israel.

In the U.S., Naparstek's work helped redefine the function of public housing through community-building. As director of the Cleveland Foundation Commission on Poverty in the early 1990s, Naparstek oversaw the drafting of "The Cleveland Community-Building Initiative" report. The study became the foundation for the U.S. Department of Housing and Urban Development's Urban Revitalization Demonstration Act of 1993, known as HOPE VI. The multibillion-dollar HUD program re-conceived federal housing policy, in part, through community-building—by giving local community leaders and tenants a greater role in developing the revitalization plans for their housing projects and more control over operations.

"By building community, we are talking about people forming relationships," Naparstek said in a 2000 interview on National Public Radio. "People are poor because they lack relationships with people who have access to resources and power."

In the 1960s, Naparstek started his professional social work career as an assistant to Richard G. Hatcher, the mayor of Gary, Indiana, and the nation's second African-American mayor of a northern industrial city who was elected in 1967, after the first black mayor of a major U.S. city, Carl Stokes, a Democrat was elected mayor of Cleveland, Ohio earlier in that same year. In the 1970s, Naparstek worked with Monsignor Geno Baroni of the National Center for Urban Ethnic Affairs and future members of Congress Barbara Mikulski and Marcy Kaptur to write the Home Mortgage Disclosure Act of 1975 and the Community Reinvestment Act of 1977. During that period, Naparstek wrote the legislation authorizing the National Commission on Neighborhoods. President Jimmy Carter appointed Naparstek to serve on that Commission as well as the President's Commission on Mental Health's Task Panel on Community Support Systems.

In 1983, Naparstek became Dean of the Case Western Reserve University School of Applied Social Sciences. As Dean, Naparstek raised funds to expand the school into a new building and it was renamed the Mandel School of Applied Social Sciences.

In 1994, while still based at the Mandel School, President Bill Clinton appointed Naparstek to the Corporation for National Service. In 1995, Naparstek was appointed to the Urban Institute in Washington, D.C., as a senior associate directing the Institute's HOPE VI initiative. Over the course of his social work and academic career, Naparstek co-authored four books and published many articles about the importance of community-building and mental health in public policy.

U.S. Senator Barbara Mikulski (D-MD) called Naparstek "one of our most imaginative public policy thinkers." She said he cared "not just about programs, he put people first." Mikulski worked with Naparstek and Representative Louis Stokes (D-OH) on housing legislation, a collaboration she described as an "iron triangle," of which "Art was the brain trust."

Naparstek held a variety of leadership positions in Cleveland's Jewish community, as well as nationally. As co-chairman of the Jewish Community Federation of Cleveland's Partnership 2000 program, Naparstek applied his community-building concepts in Beit She'an, a city in northern Israel. There he designed a program to train volunteer leadership and strengthen the economic base of the northern Israeli city, in part, by working to resolve longstanding conflicts between Beit She'an's Sephardic and Ashkenazi Jewish communities and by building connections to neighboring Palestinian and Jordanian cities. In 1999, Naparstek orchestrated an unprecedented meeting between the mayor of Beit She'an and the Palestinian governor of Jenin at his home in Cleveland Heights to discuss joint economic development and community-building plans. Israeli Prime Minister Ehud Barak incorporated the Beit She'an community-building model into a $300 million program for eleven other development towns throughout Israel.

As an outgrowth of his work in Beit She'an, Naparstek was appointed senior vice president of United Jewish Communities in 2001 with oversight of the organization's Israel and Overseas Pillar. At UJC he helped connect North American Jewish Federations with Israel and Jewish communities around the world. He also developed the Ethiopian National Project, aimed at speeding the acculturation of Israel's Ethiopian community.

The son of Jewish immigrants from Poland, Naparstek was born in New York City and grew up in the Bronx and in Mount Vernon. Naparstek received a bachelor's degree from Illinois Wesleyan University, a master's degree in social work from New York University, and a doctorate from Brandeis University's Florence Heller Graduate School of Advanced Studies in Social Welfare Administration.

Naparstek died from lung cancer on April 24, 2004, at University Hospitals of Cleveland.

In 2005, The Mandel Center for Nonprofit Organizations at Case Western Reserve University established the Arthur J. Naparstek Philanthropic Fund based on gifts totaling nearly $1.6 million. The Fund endows two scholarships per year, for one American and one Israeli student to earn a masters in nonprofit management.

The Arthur J. Naparstek papers, 1962-2004, can be found at the Western Reserve Historical Society in Cleveland, Ohio. The collection is of value to researchers studying ethnicity and class in American neighborhoods, urban policy, urban renewal, philanthropy, higher education administration, community service, and the Cleveland, Ohio, Jewish community, especially its involvement in the development of Israel. Materials in the collection focus on both the federal commitment to national urban renewal and, specifically, urban renewal in Cleveland. The collection also documents attempts by Jewish communal organizations to support absorbing and integrating disparate immigrant groups, like Jewish Ethiopians, into Israeli society. Of particular note in the collection are the assessments and evaluations of the Hope VI local programs in urban regeneration and reports and evaluations concerning the challenges faced by Mayor Gary Hatcher of the city of Gary, Indiana.

Naparstek's impact on his community, his country and the State of Israel was summed up in a eulogy delivered by his friend and colleague, James O. Gibson of the Rockefeller Foundation:

To say that Art was a social worker would be to grossly oversimplify who he has and what he did. That would also be true of thinking of him solely as an urban policy scholar; or as a politically astute university professor; an entrepreneurial academic administrator; a nationally renowned antipoverty warrior; a shrewd Washington DC real estate speculator; a canny foundation executive; a highly effective rainmaker for the Urban Institute; one of the most astoundingly talented networkers who ever strode the earth — and that's before you mention champion of Israeli community-building, super Dad, doting husband, and friend extraordinaire.
