= Maliz E. Beams =

American government official

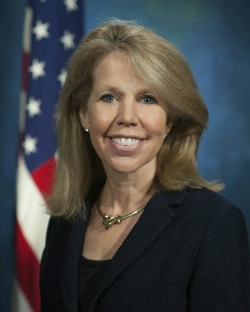

33rd Counselor of the United States Department of State
- In office August 17, 2017 – November 27, 2017
- President: Donald Trump
- Preceded by: Kristie Kenney
- Succeeded by: Ulrich Brechbuhl

Personal details
- Education: Boston College (BA); Columbia University (MBA)

Maliz E. Beams served as Counselor of the United States Department of State from August 17, 2017, to November 27, 2017, during the presidency of Donald Trump. She was hired by then-Secretary of State Rex Tillerson as what Bloomberg News called the "redesign chief" of a department restructuring. Her departure after three months of service drew media attention and was cited as evidence of problems within the department.

Before working for the State Department, Beams was chief executive officer at Voya Financial and interim CEO at the New England Aquarium. During the 1990s she worked in mutual fund marketing for multiple firms, including Scudder, Stevens, and Clark and Fleet Financial Group.

Beams earned her Bachelor of Arts in English from Boston College and her Master of Business Administration from Columbia University.
