= Counselor of the United States Department of State =

Special advisor to the Secretary of State

- Seal of the United States Department of State

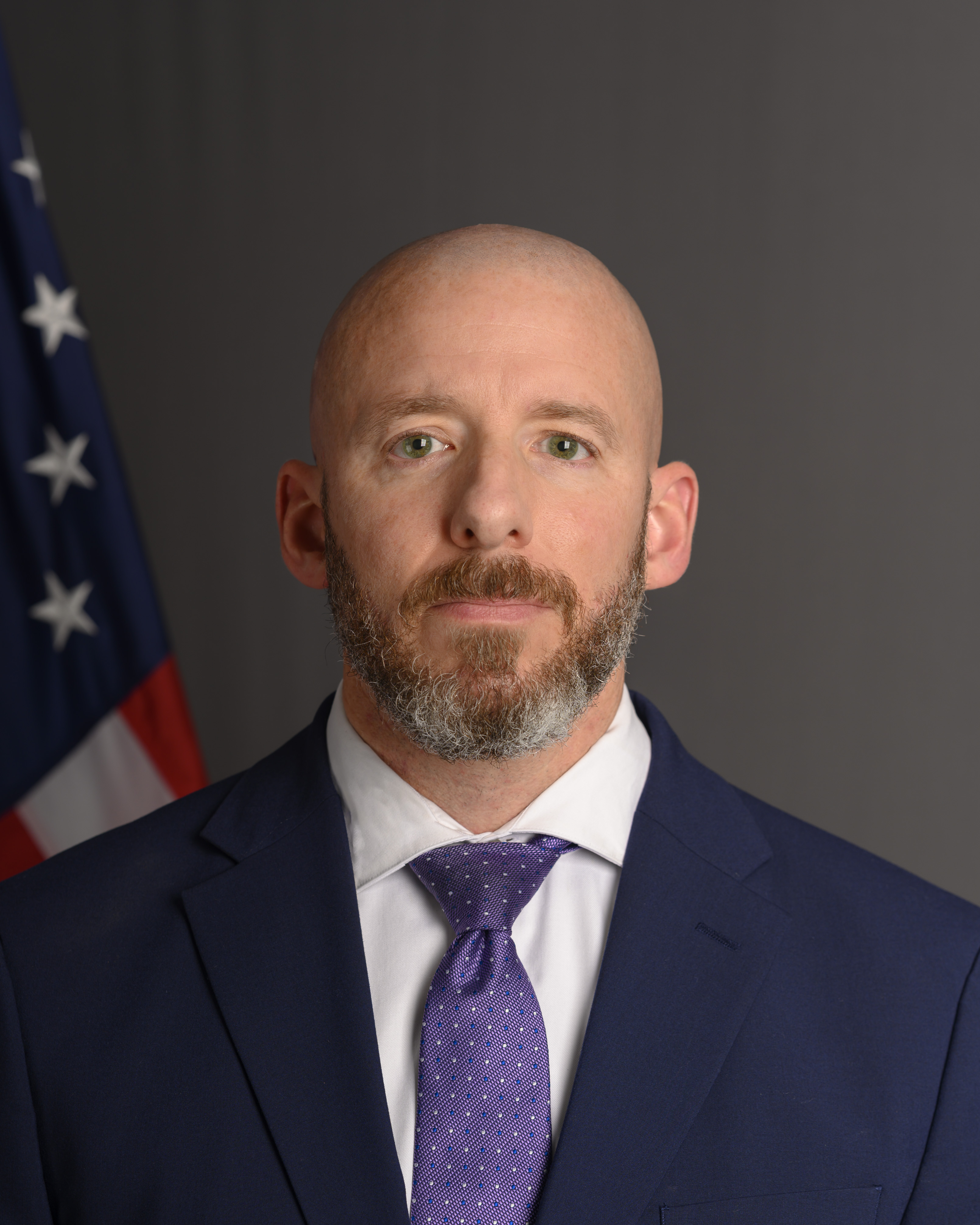
- Incumbent; Daniel Holler since May 26, 2026
- Reports to: United States Secretary of State
- Nominator: President of the United States
- Inaugural holder: Chandler P. Anderson
- Formation: 1909
- Website: Official website

The counselor of the United States Department of State is a position within the United States Department of State that serves the secretary of state as a special advisor and consultant on major problems of foreign policy and who provides guidance to the appropriate bureaus with respect to such matters. The counselor conducts special international negotiations and consultations, and also undertakes special assignments from time to time, as directed by the secretary of state. Currently, the counselor holds under law a rank equivalent to that of under secretary of state. Unlike the other under secretaries of state, the counselor currently does not require Senate confirmation. Historically, the role was appointed by the president, by and with the advice and consent of the United States Senate as authorized by 22 U.S. Code § 2651a as one of four "other senior officials."

The secretary of state created the position of counselor for the Department of State in 1909 as part of a general department reorganization. In 1912, the position became a presidential appointment. Between 1913 and 1919, the counselor served as the department's second-ranking officer, assuming the role previously exercised by the assistant secretary of state. In 1919, the newly created position of under secretary of state subsumed the duties of the counselor. An Act of Congress, May 18, 1937, re-established the position of counselor of the Department of State. Between 1961 and 1966, the counselor also served as the chairman of the Policy Planning Council. On April 30, 1994, the title was changed to under secretary of state for global affairs when Counselor Timothy E. Wirth was appointed to that position, but another counselor was appointed in 1997.

== List of counselors of the United States Department of State ==
#	Name	Assumed office	Left office	President served under
1	Chandler P. Anderson	August 23, 1912	April 22, 1913	William Howard Taft
2	John Bassett Moore	April 23, 1913	March 4, 1914	Woodrow Wilson
3	Robert Lansing	April 1, 1914	June 23, 1915	Woodrow Wilson
4	Frank Polk	September 16, 1915	June 30, 1919	Woodrow Wilson
5	R. Walton Moore	May 21, 1937	February 8, 1941	Franklin D. Roosevelt
6	Benjamin Victor Cohen	September 14, 1945	July 31, 1947	Harry S. Truman
7	Charles E. Bohlen	August 1, 1947	August 3, 1949	Harry S. Truman
8	George F. Kennan	August 4, 1949	July 11, 1951	Harry S. Truman
9	Charles E. Bohlen	July 12, 1951	March 29, 1953	Dwight D. Eisenhower
10	Douglas MacArthur II	March 30, 1953	December 16, 1956	Dwight D. Eisenhower
11	G. Frederick Reinhardt	March 17, 1957	February 3, 1960	Dwight D. Eisenhower
12	Theodore Achilles	March 24, 1960	February 15, 1961	Dwight D. Eisenhower
13	George C. McGhee	February 16, 1961	December 3, 1961	John F. Kennedy
14	Walt Whitman Rostow	December 4, 1961	March 31, 1966	John F. Kennedy and Lyndon B. Johnson
15	Robert R. Bowie	September 21, 1966	April 1, 1968	Lyndon B. Johnson
16	Richard F. Pedersen	January 24, 1969	July 26, 1973	Richard Nixon
17	Helmut Sonnenfeldt	January 7, 1974	February 21, 1977	Richard Nixon and Gerald Ford
18	Matthew Nimetz	April 8, 1977	March 19, 1980	Jimmy Carter
19	Rozanne L. Ridgway	March 20, 1980	February 24, 1981	Jimmy Carter
20	Robert McFarlane	February 28, 1981	April 4, 1982	Ronald Reagan
21	James L. Buckley	September 9, 1982	September 26, 1982	Ronald Reagan
22	Ed Derwinski	March 23, 1983	March 24, 1987	Ronald Reagan
23	Max Kampelman	July 15, 1987	January 20, 1989	Ronald Reagan
24	Robert Zoellick	March 2, 1989	August 23, 1992	George H. W. Bush
-	Kenneth Juster (acting)	August 23, 1992	January 20, 1993	George H. W. Bush
25	Tim Wirth	April 23, 1993	April 30, 1994	Bill Clinton
26	Wendy Sherman	August 6, 1997	January 20, 2001	Bill Clinton
27	Philip D. Zelikow	February 1, 2005	January 2, 2007	George W. Bush
28	Eliot A. Cohen	April 30, 2007	January 20, 2009	George W. Bush
29	Cheryl Mills	January 20, 2009	February 1, 2013	Barack Obama
30	Heather Higginbottom	February 1, 2013	December 13, 2013	Barack Obama
31	Tom Shannon	December 24, 2013	February 12, 2016	Barack Obama
32	Kristie Kenney	February 12, 2016	February 17, 2017	Barack Obama; Donald Trump
33	Maliz E. Beams	August 17, 2017	November 27, 2017	Donald Trump
34	Ulrich Brechbuhl	May 1, 2018	January 20, 2021	Donald Trump
35	Derek Chollet	January 20, 2021	July 7, 2024	Joe Biden
36	Tom Sullivan	July 22, 2024	January 20, 2025	Joe Biden
37	Michael Needham	January 20, 2025	May 26, 2026	Donald Trump
38	Daniel Holler	May 26, 2026	Present	Donald Trump
