= Chandler P. Anderson =

American politician and author (1866–1936)

Chandler Parsons Anderson
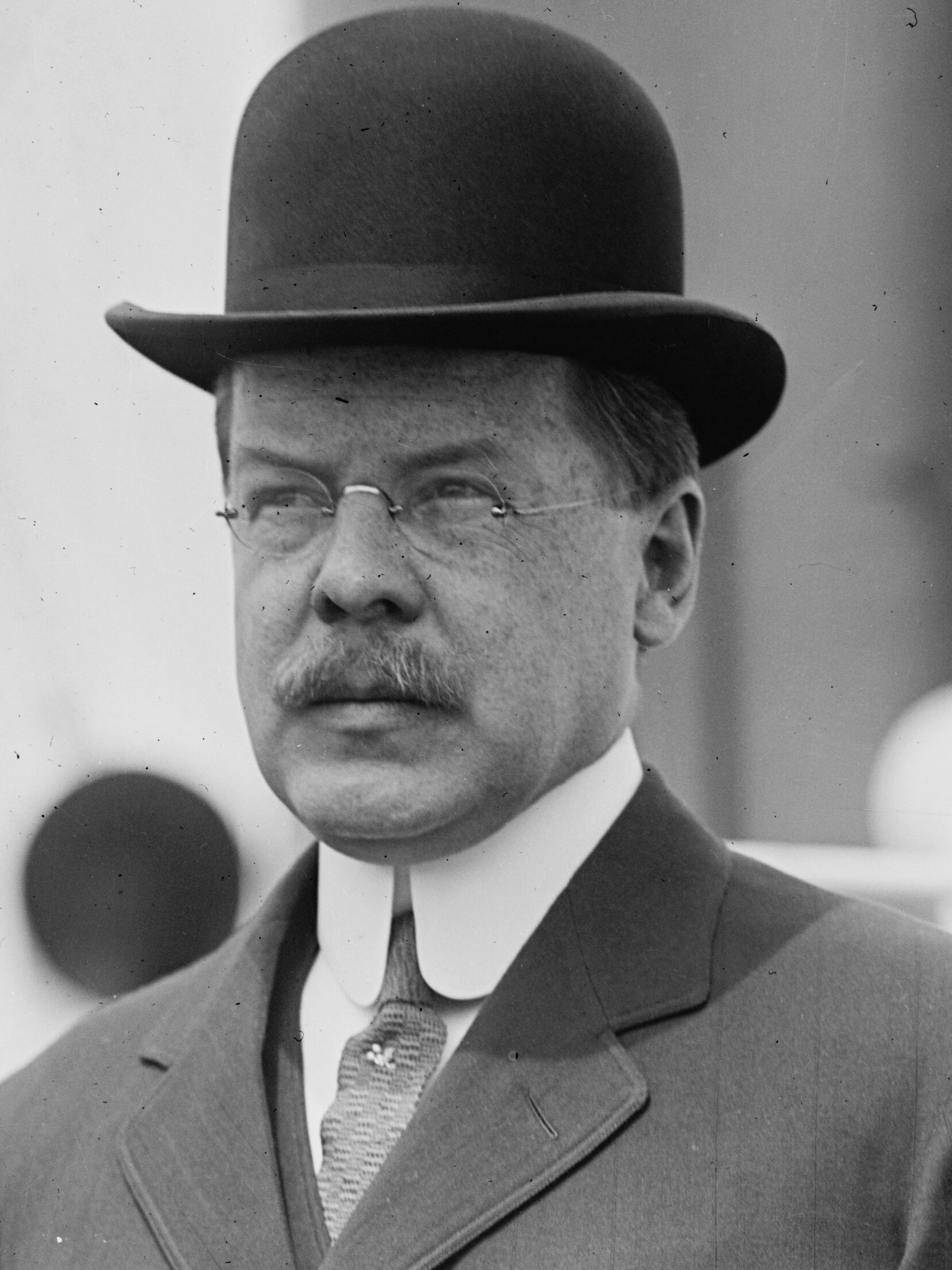

1st Counselor of the United States Department of State
- In office August 23, 1912 – April 22, 1913
- President: William Howard Taft; Woodrow Wilson
- Preceded by: office established
- Succeeded by: John Bassett Moore

Personal details
- Born: September 5, 1866 Lakeville, Connecticut
- Died: August 2, 1936 (aged 69) York Harbor, Maine

Chandler Parsons Anderson (September 5, 1866 – August 2, 1936) was the inaugural holder of the Counselor of the United States Department of State position, serving in that capacity from August 23, 1912, to April 22, 1913. He served under President William Howard Taft and was replaced by John Bassett Moore.

== Biography ==
Anderson was born in Lakeville, Connecticut on September 5, 1866. He graduated from Yale University with a B.A. degree in 1887. Anderson then attended Harvard Law School from 1888 to 1889. He was admitted to the New York state bar in 1891.

On May 17, 1899, he married Harriet S. Ward.

During World War I, Anderson served as special counsel on international affairs for the War Industries Board.

He wrote multiple books, including Northern Boundary of the United States and Immunity of Neutral Sea-Borne Commerce.

In later life, Anderson lived in Washington, D.C. He died at his summer home in York Harbor, Maine on August 2, 1936.
