= Thomas A. Shannon Jr. =

American diplomat (born 1958)

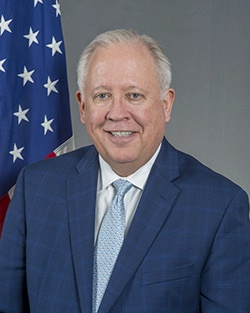

22nd Under Secretary of State for Political Affairs
- In office February 12, 2016 – June 4, 2018
- President: Barack Obama; Donald Trump
- Secretary: John Kerry; Rex Tillerson; Mike Pompeo
- Preceded by: Wendy Sherman
- Succeeded by: Stephen D. Mull (acting)
- Acting; July 28, 2011 – September 21, 2011
- President: Barack Obama
- Preceded by: William J. Burns
- Succeeded by: Wendy Sherman

Acting United States Deputy Secretary of State
- In office February 1, 2017 – May 24, 2017
- President: Donald Trump
- Preceded by: Antony Blinken
- Succeeded by: John J. Sullivan

United States Secretary of State
- Acting
- In office January 20, 2017 – February 1, 2017
- President: Donald Trump
- Preceded by: John Kerry
- Succeeded by: Rex Tillerson

31st Counselor of the United States Department of State
- In office December 24, 2013 – February 12, 2016
- President: Barack Obama
- Preceded by: Heather Higginbottom
- Succeeded by: Kristie Kenney

United States Ambassador to Brazil
- In office February 4, 2010 – September 6, 2013
- President: Barack Obama
- Preceded by: Clifford M. Sobel
- Succeeded by: Liliana Ayalde

30th Assistant Secretary of State for Western Hemisphere Affairs
- In office October 17, 2005 – November 10, 2009
- President: George W. Bush; Barack Obama
- Preceded by: Roger Noriega
- Succeeded by: Arturo Valenzuela

Personal details
- Born: Thomas Alfred Shannon Jr. 1958 (age 67–68) Minneapolis, Minnesota, U.S.
- Education: College of William & Mary (BA); University College, Oxford (MPhil, DPhil)

Thomas Alfred Shannon Jr. (born 1958) is an American diplomat who served as Under Secretary of State for Political Affairs from 2016 to 2018. In early 2017, Shannon served as acting United States secretary of state until President Donald Trump's nominee, Rex Tillerson, was confirmed. He was also acting deputy secretary of state of the United States until the Senate confirmed President Trump's nominee, John J. Sullivan.

Since 1984, Shannon has worked in the United States Foreign Service, and he has served in embassies around the world. From 2005 to 2009, he was Assistant Secretary of State for Western Hemisphere Affairs, and from 2010 to 2013 he was United States ambassador to Brazil. From 2013 to 2016, he was Counselor of the United States Department of State, and was also acting under secretary of state for political affairs in 2011. On February 2, 2016, the Senate confirmed Shannon as Under Secretary of State for Political Affairs. Just under two years later, the Associated Press reported that Shannon would be stepping down from the post pending the naming of a successor.

After retirement, Shannon joined law firm Arnold & Porter as senior international policy advisor.

Shannon is currently the Charles and Marie Robertson Visiting Professor at the Princeton School of Public and International Affairs at Princeton University, where he is also a co-director of the program in history and the practice of diplomacy.

Shannon currently serves as the co-chair of the Inter-American Dialogue's board of directors and is on the board of directors for the Global Americans think tank.

== Early life and education ==
Shannon graduated from the College of William & Mary with a B.A. with high honors in government and politics in 1980. He went on to University College, Oxford, where he completed a M.Phil. in 1982 and a D.Phil. in 1983, both in politics. He speaks both Spanish and Portuguese.

== Career ==
=== Early career ===
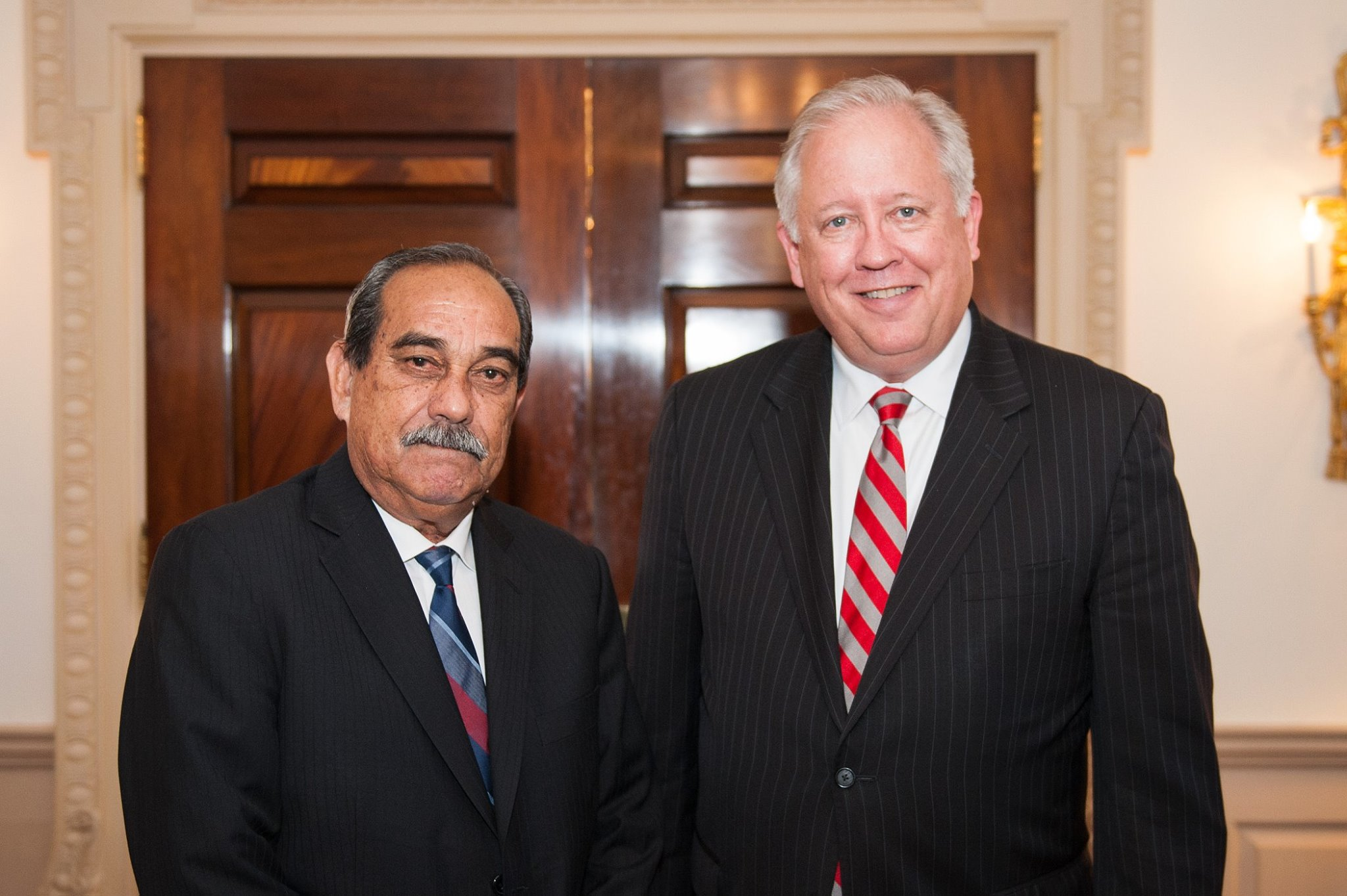
Micronesia President Peter M. Christian and Thomas A. Shannon Jr.

Shannon subsequently joined the United States Foreign Service as a Foreign Service Officer. He was the consular/political rotational officer at the U.S. embassy in Guatemala City, Guatemala from 1984 to 1986; the country officer for Cameroon, Gabon and São Tomé and Príncipe from 1987 to 1989; and the special assistant to the ambassador at the U.S. embassy in Brasília, Brazil, from 1989 to 1992.

He served as the regional labor attaché at the U.S. consulate-general in Johannesburg, South Africa, from 1992 to 1996; as political counselor at the U.S. embassy in Caracas, Venezuela, from 1996 to 1999; and as the director for inter-American affairs at the National Security Council (NSC) from 1999 to 2000.

Shannon was appointed as U.S. deputy permanent representative to the Organization of American States (OAS) from 2000 to 2001, serving under Luis J. Lauredo. From 2001 to 2002, Shannon was the director of Andean affairs at the Bureau of Western Hemisphere Affairs, Department of State. He served as Deputy Assistant Secretary of Western Hemisphere Affairs from 2002 to 2003.

Shannon then served as Special Assistant to the President and Senior Director for Western Hemisphere Affairs at the NSC from 2003 to 2005. In October 2005, he became Assistant Secretary of State for Western Hemisphere Affairs and served in that role until November 2009, when he was replaced by Arturo Valenzuela. He was appointed as United States ambassador to Brazil in February 2010 and served there until September 2013. For a period from July 2011 to September 2011, he was concurrently the acting under secretary of state for political affairs at the Department of State. In 2012, the Senate granted Shannon the rank of career ambassador in the U.S. Foreign Service.

=== State Department counselor ===
In December 2013, Shannon was appointed as Counselor of the United States Department of State, only the second foreign service officer ever appointed to that office. In early 2015, President Obama issued an executive order levying sanctions against seven Venezuelan officials; the order also called Venezuela a threat to the United States. President Nicolás Maduro accused the United States government of planning to invade Venezuela.

In April 2015, The New York Times reported that Shannon was in Venezuela, and was supposedly going to meet with President Maduro. Shannon was supposedly there to deliver a message to Maduro from the United States government. The State Department later issued a statement saying that the Venezuelan government had invited the United States government to send a diplomat to Caracas to meet with Maduro before the Summit of the Americas meeting. The Venezuelan Foreign Ministry then issued a statement saying that Shannon had met with the Venezuelan foreign minister. The Foreign Ministry later confirmed that Shannon "brought a message from his government." Shannon retained his position as Counselor until February 12, 2016, when he was appointed as Under Secretary of State for Political Affairs for the last year of Barack Obama's presidency.

=== Acting secretary of state ===
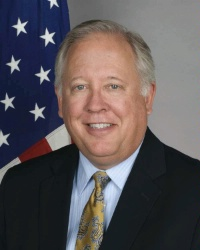
Shannon's portrait during his ambassadorship

After Donald Trump was inaugurated 45th president of the United States on January 20, 2017, Shannon became Acting United States secretary of state. He remained in office for only 12 days, when on February 1, 2017, the Senate confirmed Rex Tillerson, President Trump's nominee, as Secretary of State.

While Shannon was acting secretary of state, President Trump dismissed many prominent and senior State Department officials, resulting in the firing or forced resignations of over a dozen career diplomats, leaving a majority of senior career positions at the department vacant. Most notably, Thomas Countryman, acting undersecretary for arms control and international security, was on his way to Rome for an international meeting on nuclear weapons when he discovered that he had been summarily removed from his position. Without leaving the airport, he turned around and got on the first flight back to Washington.

=== Under Secretary for Political Affairs ===
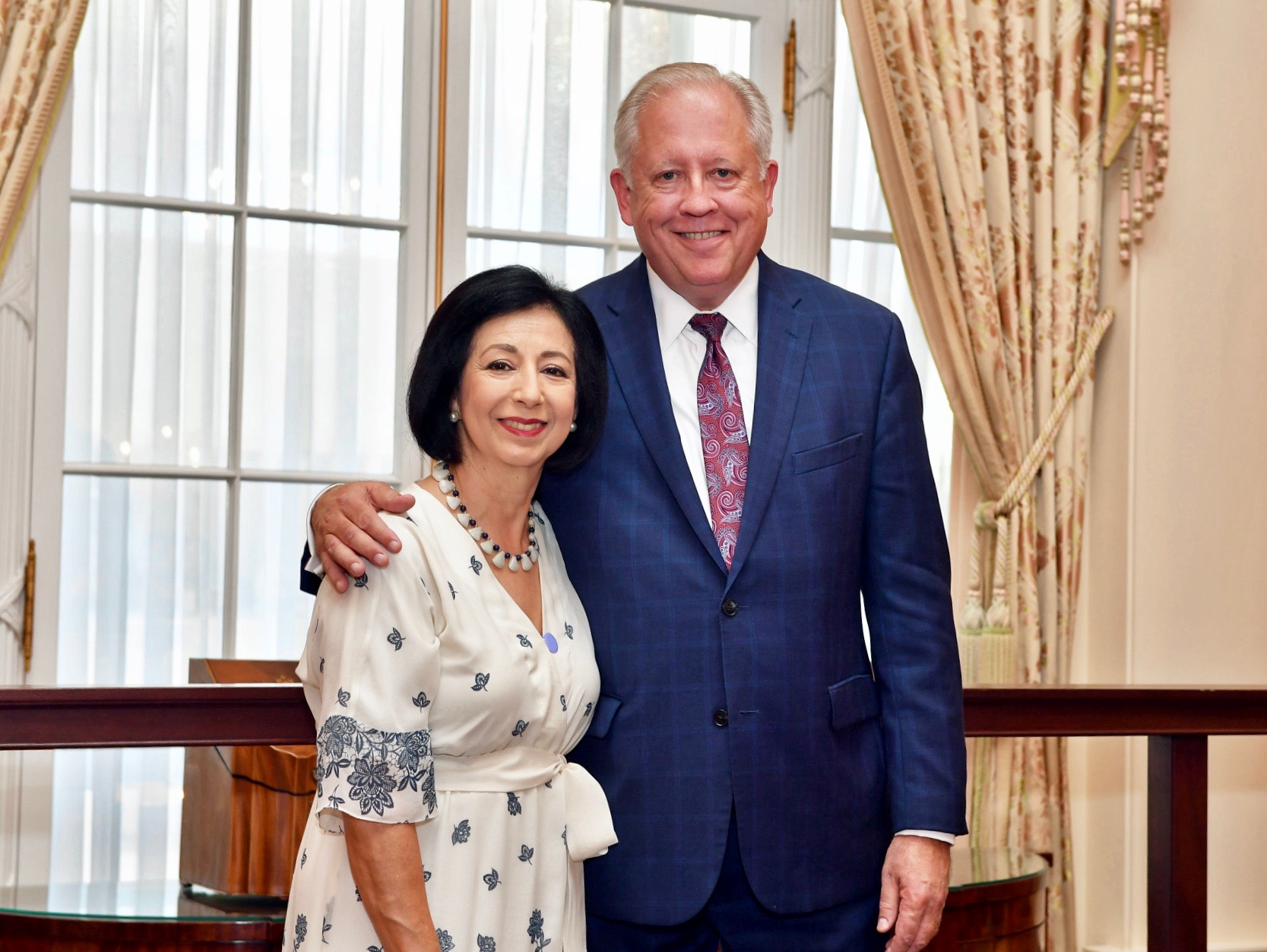
Shannon with his wife Guisela Shannon upon his retirement from the State Department in 2018

On February 2, 2016, the Senate confirmed Shannon as Under Secretary of State for Political Affairs.

In June 2016, Shannon complained about the Government of China's claim of domination in the South China Sea, calling it "madness." On June 29, 2016, he met with India Foreign Secretary Jaishankar, and expressed support for the Indian government, calling it America's "anchor" in the Asia-Pacific region.

On February 1, 2018, Shannon announced his plans for retirement, saying he would stay in the job until a replacement is named. He told the Associated Press the retirement was for personal rather than political reasons, noting his age and the recent death of his mother.

In 2020, Shannon, along with over 130 other former Republican national security officials, signed a statement that asserted that President Trump was unfit to serve another term, and "To that end, we are firmly convinced that it is in the best interest of our nation that Vice President Joe Biden be elected as the next president of the United States, and we will vote for him."

== Personal life ==
He is a member of Phi Beta Kappa society.

== See also ==
- List of foreign ministers in 2017
- List of ambassadors of the United States to Brazil

Diplomatic posts
Preceded by Clifford M. Sobel	United States Ambassador to Brazil; 2010–2013	Succeeded by Liliana Ayalde
Political offices
Preceded by Roger Noriega	Assistant Secretary of State for Western Hemisphere Affairs; 2005–2009	Succeeded by Arturo Valenzuela
Preceded by William J. Burns	Under Secretary of State for Political Affairs; Acting; 2011	Succeeded by Wendy Sherman
Preceded by Heather Higginbottom	Counselor of the United States Department of State; 2013–2016	Succeeded by Kristie Kenney
Preceded by Wendy Sherman	Under Secretary of State for Political Affairs; 2016–2018	Succeeded by Stephen D. Mull; Acting
Preceded by Antony Blinken; Acting	United States Secretary of State; Acting; 2017	Succeeded by Rex Tillerson
Preceded by Antony Blinken	United States Deputy Secretary of State; Acting; 2017	Succeeded by John J. Sullivan
