= Belleruth Naparstek =

American social worker and author

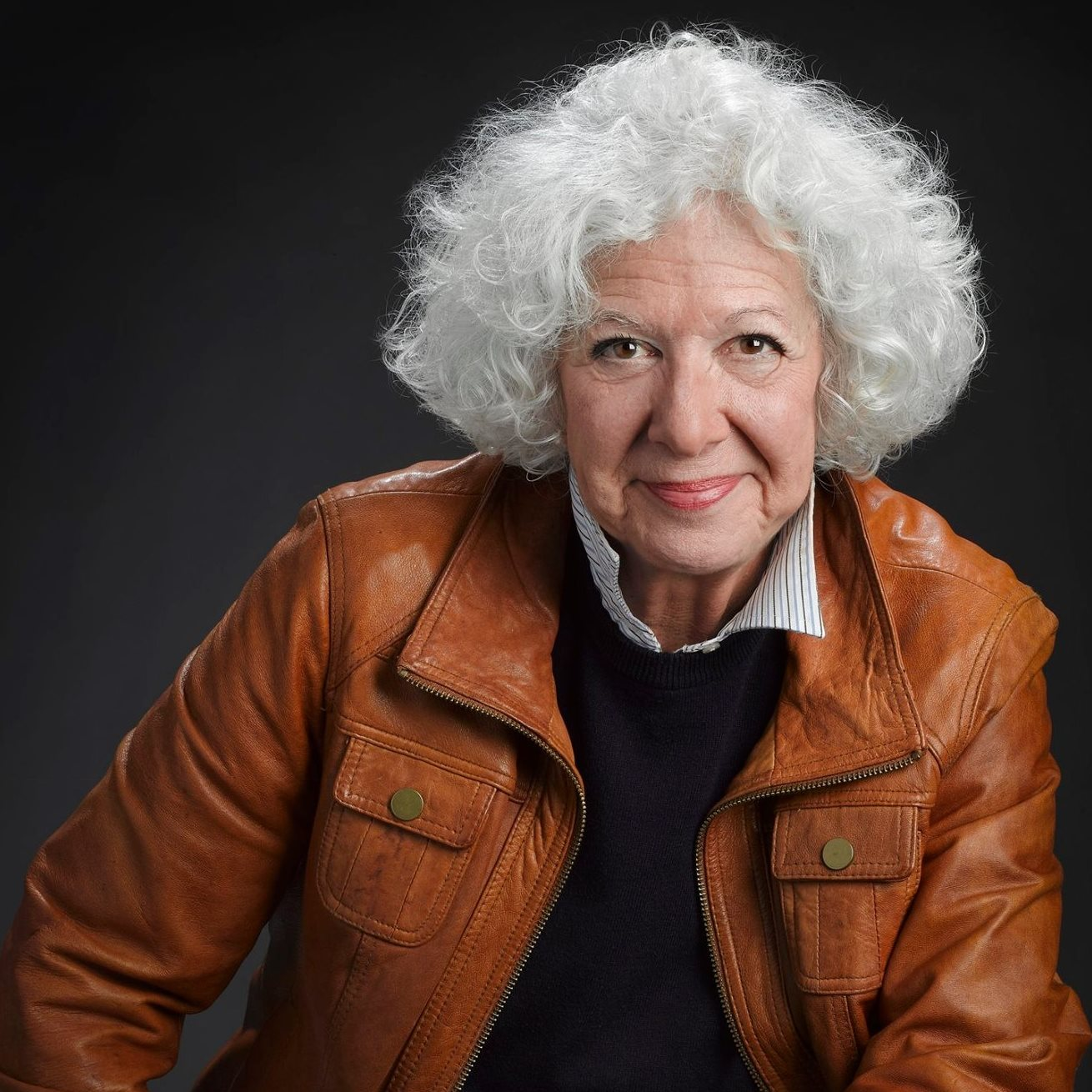
- Born: December 25, 1942 (age 83); Boston, Massachusetts, US
- Education: University of Chicago
- Occupations: Social worker, author in the field of guided imagery.
- Spouse: Arthur Naparstek
- Children: Aaron Naparstek, Keila Naparstek, Abe Naparstek

Belleruth Naparstek (born December 25, 1942) is an American social worker, author, teacher and the producer of a guided imagery library of self-administered audio programs.

Naparstek was born in Boston, Massachusetts. She did her undergraduate and graduate work at University of Chicago in social work, and then worked in hospitals and clinics, then taught at Case Western Reserve University. She eventually developed guided imagery tapes, which have been used in some hospitals and clinics that have adopted alternative medicine practices as adjuvant therapies.

Naparstek teaches Guided Imagery on the faculty of the University of Arizona Center for Integrative Medicine's post doctoral Fellowship Program.

== Books ==
- Naparstek, Belleruth (2004). Invisible heroes : survivors of trauma and how they heal. New York, N.Y.: Bantam Books. ISBN 978-0553803501.
- Naparstek, Belleruth (1997). Your sixth sense : activating your psychic potential (1st ed.). San Francisco: HarperSanFrancisco. ISBN 978-0062513595.
- Naparstek, Belleruth (1994). Staying well with guided imagery. New York: Warner Books. ISBN 978-0446518215.
