= Gwen C. Clare =

American diplomat (born 1945)

Gwen C. Clare (born 1945) is the former American ambassador to Ecuador (1999–2001) and El Salvador (1992–1993) and was Consul General in Guayaquil, Ecuador (1991–1993) and Sao Paulo, Brazil (1997–1999) and was a diplomat-in-residence at the Carter Center.

Clare is married to Daniel Hunt Clare III who also worked for the State Department and when he retired, was the executive assistant to the under secretary for security assistance, science and technology in Washington.

She graduated from George Washington University and the National War College.
