= Geno Baroni =

American Roman Catholic priest

Msgr. Geno Baroni

Orders
- Ordination: 1956

Personal details
- Born: October 24, 1930 Acosta, Pennsylvania, US
- Died: August 26, 1984 (aged 53)
- Denomination: Roman Catholic
- Education: Mount St. Mary's College
- Alma mater: Mount St. Mary's Seminary

Geno Baroni (October 24, 1930 – August 26, 1984) was an American Catholic priest and social activist who was instrumental in founding the National Italian American Foundation in 1975 and served as its first president.

== Biography ==
Baroni was born on October 24, 1930, in Acosta, Pennsylvania, the son of Italian immigrants.

Baroni graduated from Mount St. Mary's College in 1952 and Mount St. Mary's Seminary in 1956 (both are part of what is now Mount St. Mary's University). He was ordained a priest in 1956 and first served in Johnstown and Altoona, PA, later being assigned to Sts. Paul and Augustine parish in Washington, D.C. (1960–1965), where he ministered to the urban poor. He was appointed executive director of Office of Urban Affairs of the Washington Archdiocese (1965–1967), then director of the Urban Taskforce of the US Catholic Conference (1967–1970).

Baroni and his associates at the National Center for Urban Ethnic Affairs (NCUEA) developed an alternative approach to urban economic and cultural contradictions. This approach implied a critique of the civil rights movement and its advocate governmental agency, the U.S. Commission on Civil Rights. At bottom this difference involved ethnic and racial culturalism versus a White v. Black/Majority v. Minorities vision of America and the relative importance and emphasis on place and community v. individual rights and the universal claim of social justice. These advocates for urban neighborhoods and cultural pluralism argued for the creation of a National Neighborhood Commission which would promote the renewal of urban life and more adequately address the pluralistic character of American culture.

Baroni and the NCUEA forged substantial pieces of social legislation in the 1970s, and helped to launch the careers of future national leaders. U.S. Senator Barbara Mikulski, U.S. Representative Marcy Kaptur, and Arthur J. Naparstek, Dean of the Mandel School of Applied Social Sciences at Case Western Reserve University, worked with Baroni to write the Home Mortgage Disclosure Act of 1975 and the Community Reinvestment Act of 1977.

At the heart of Baroni's vision was catholic social teaching in action. This places him in succession with notables: Fr. Edward McGlynn of Henry George association, Msgr. John A. Ryan, Fr. Edwin Vincent O'Hara as well as Dorothy Day.

Baroni was a kind of godfather of the US Catholic Campaign for Human Development (CHD). In the words of Rep. Marcy Kaptur, D-OH, Baroni was a "visionary and crusader whose concern was always human development." He spearheaded today's CHD when he gathered a group of people in 1969 to form an institution to study the underlying causes of poverty. Understanding the strife still prevalent in urban areas, Baroni, in 1970, convoked the first national conference of urban ethnic neighborhoods and inaugurated the National Neighborhood Coalition. In 1971, Baroni was elected to the Common Cause National Governing Board.

On the occasion of the tenth anniversary of his death, Baroni disciple Sen. Barbara Mikulski, D-MD, noted: "If Geno were alive today, he would be asking us to develop not only economic capital, but social capital -- values and virtues such as trustworthiness, respect, responsibility."

"Geno was not a leader but an organizer," said Dr. John A Kromkowski, current president of the National Center for Urban Ethnic Affairs. "His real arena was to bring different ethnic and racial voices to Washington to give testimony and challenge federal programs."

Baroni was the Catholic Coordinator for the August 1963 March on Washington for Jobs and Freedom, at which Rev. Martin Luther King Jr. gave his "I Have A Dream" speech; he also marched with King in Selma, Alabama, in March 1965.

In 1969 he gathered a group of people to form an institution to study the underlying causes of poverty. With strife still prevalent in urban areas, Baroni, in 1970, convoked the first national conference of urban ethnic neighborhoods and inaugurated the National Neighborhood Coalition.

In 1971, Fr. Baroni founded the National Center for Urban Ethnic Affairs which is now headquartered at The Catholic University of America.

Fr. Baroni was instrumental in founding the National Italian American Foundation in 1975 and served as its first president.

In 1977, he was offered position in the Carter administration as Housing and Urban Development Assistant Secretary for Neighborhood Development, Consumer Affairs, and Regulatory Functions. He helped push through the 1977 Community Reinvestment Act, which propped up revitalization processes in urban areas around the country. In a 1987 speech at Catholic University Arthur J. Naparstek, then president of the Geno C. Baroni society, noted that Baroni "attained the highest Government post a Catholic priest has ever achieved. He became a bureaucrat because he knew the only change in the bureaucracy comes through a change in the people."

Shortly before his death in 1984, Geno explored South Africa's apartheid townships and visited with Bishop Desmond Tutu. He died at age 54 on August 26, 1984, after a long struggle with cancer.

== Further reading and primary source materials ==
- O'Rourke, Lawrence M. (1991). Geno: The Life and Mission of Geno Baroni. Paulist Press. ISBN 0-8091-3274-5 – via Google Books.
- Public Morality. Forum on Public Morality, In Celebration of the Seventy-Fifth Birthday of Father Geno Baroni. Washington, D.C.: Milton S. Eisenhower Foundation (text), C-SPAN (video). 2005-10-24.
