= Aaron Naparstek =

American journalist

- Born: 1970 (age 55–56); Boston, Massachusetts, US
- Writing career
- Genre: journalism
- Notable work: Streetsblog
- Website: naparstek.com

Aaron Naparstek (born 1970 in Boston, Massachusetts) is the founder of Streetsblog, a website providing daily coverage of transportation, anti-automobile activism, land use, and environmental issues in New York City. Since its founding in June 2006, Streetsblog has emerged as an influential forum for New York City's Livable Streets Movement, which is dedicated to reclaiming cities' public spaces from the automobile and improving conditions for pedestrians, cyclists, and transit users. Streetsblog is published by OpenPlans.

== Career ==
Before launching Streetsblog, Naparstek wrote the Department of Traffic column and feature-length cover stories for the alternative weekly newspaper the New York Press. In the early 2000s, under the mentorship of Executive Director John Kaehny, Naparstek began his advocacy and activism career as a campaign coordinator for Transportation Alternatives. There, he organized campaigns to eliminate motor vehicles from Prospect Park worked to create safer conditions for pedestrians, and won significant expansions of New York City's bicycle network. In 2003, Naparstek authored Honku: The Zen Antidote for Road Rage, a book of humorous haiku poetry inspired by the unique brand of sociopathic motorist behavior observed in his Brooklyn neighborhood. Naparstek's Honku story served as an inspiration for the Ray Ploshansky honking storyline in season four of HBO's "Girls." Naparstek's 2016 telling of the Honku story at the Avalon Hollywood Theater in Los Angeles was produced as a story for The Moth Radio Hour.

Prior to his involvement in New York City transportation policy, advocacy, and politics, Naparstek worked for six years as an independent interactive media producer, designing, and developing original content, e-commerce, and live webcast products for major corporations, start-ups, non-profits and Internet-oriented venture capital firms. In 1999. he collaborated with his mother, Belleruth Naparstek, the noted social worker, author, and producer of the Health Journeys line of guided imagery audio programs, to produce a web-based complementary healthcare service called DesktopSpa.

From 1996 to 1997, Naparstek worked as content programming manager for Firefly, the start-up founded by students from MIT's Media Lab that pioneered web-based collaborative filtering technology. After Firefly, Naparstek spent a year working at the Microsoft Corporation as part of the team that built and launched the urban online guide Sidewalk.com. From 1994 to 1996. Naparstek worked as online editor at Spin Magazine where he created and ran SPINonline, an award-winning online music and pop culture forum for teens on AOL. At SPINonline, Naparstek conceived, built, and ran the 1995 Lollapalooza Online Diaries, one of the first experiments in allowing celebrity musical artists to communicate directly with fans using new digital media tools that were just becoming available on the commercial Internet.

Naparstek has a master's degree from Columbia University Graduate School of Journalism and a BA in History from Washington University in St. Louis.

He was a Loeb Fellow at Harvard University's Graduate School of Design in 2012 and was twice selected as a U.S. German Marshall Fellow in 2004 and 2006.

Since its founding in 2011, Naparstek has served as a board member of Reinvent Albany, a good government group working for open, transparent, and accountable government in New York State and New York City. In 2015, Naparstek outed himself as the creator of Fake Sheldon Silver] a political satire project and Twitter parody of the Speaker of the New York State Assembly popular with New York political insiders.

== Personal life ==
He lives in Brooklyn with his wife, the filmmaker and dancer Joanne Nerenberg, and their two sons. He is a co-founder of the Park Slope Neighbors community organization, the Grand Army Plaza Coalition and StreetsPAC. He is a former executive board member of the Park Slope Civic Council, chair of Transportation Alternative's Brooklyn Committee, and member of the Brooklyn Community Board Six transportation committee.

Naparstek is an alum of the Habonim Dror youth movement and was the Director of Camp Moshava in Street, Maryland, during the summer of 1993.
