= Rakolta =

Rakolta is a surname. Notable people with the surname include:

- John Rakolta (born 1947), American businessman
- Terry Rakolta (born 1944), American activist
