= 2002 United States Senate election in Michigan =

- November 5, 2002
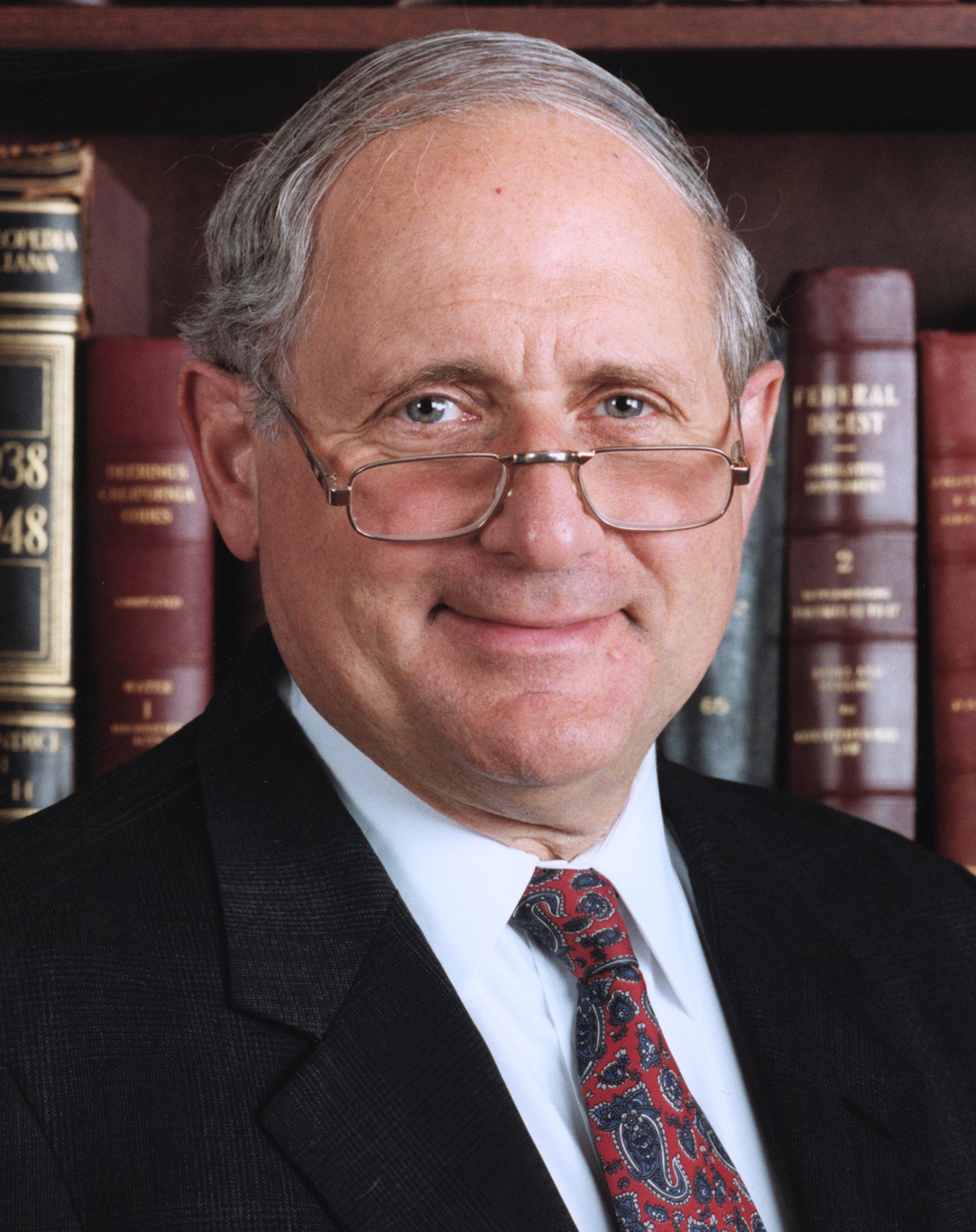

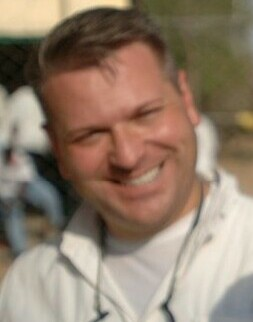
Nominee	Carl Levin	Rocky Raczkowski
Party	Democratic	Republican
Popular vote	1,896,614	1,185,545
Percentage	60.61%	37.89%
- Levin: 40–50% 50–60% 60–70% 70–80% Raczkowski: 40–50% 50–60% 60–70%
U.S. senator before election
Carl Levin
Democratic
Elected U.S. Senator
Carl Levin
Democratic

The 2002 United States Senate election in Michigan was held on November 5, 2002. Incumbent Democratic U.S. Senator Carl Levin won re-election to a fifth term.

== General election ==
=== Candidates ===
- Eric Borregard (Green)
- Doug Dern (Natural Law)
- Carl Levin, incumbent U.S. senator (Democratic)
- John Mangopoulos (Reform)
- Rocky Raczkowski, state representative from Farmington Hills (Republican)

=== Predictions ===
Source	Ranking	As of
Sabato's Crystal Ball	Safe D	November 4, 2002

=== Results ===
Michigan U.S. Senate election, 2002
Party	Candidate	Votes	%	±%
Democratic	Carl Levin (incumbent)	1,896,614	60.61%	+2.25%
Republican	Rocky Raczkowski	1,185,545	37.89%	−1.98%
Green	Eric Borregard	23,931	0.76%	+0.76%
Reform	John Mangopoulos	12,831	0.41%	+0.41%
Natural Law	Doug Dern	10,366	0.33%	+0.03%
Majority		711,069	22.72%	+4.23%
Turnout		3,129,287		
Democratic hold				

==== Counties that flipped from Republican to Democratic ====
- Newaygo (largest city: Fremont)
- Sanilac (largest city: Sandusky)
- Ionia (largest city: Ionia)
- Clinton (largest city: St. Johns)
- Leelanau (largest settlement: Greilickville)

== See also ==
- 2002 United States Senate elections
