= 1984 United States Senate election in Michigan =

- November 6, 1984
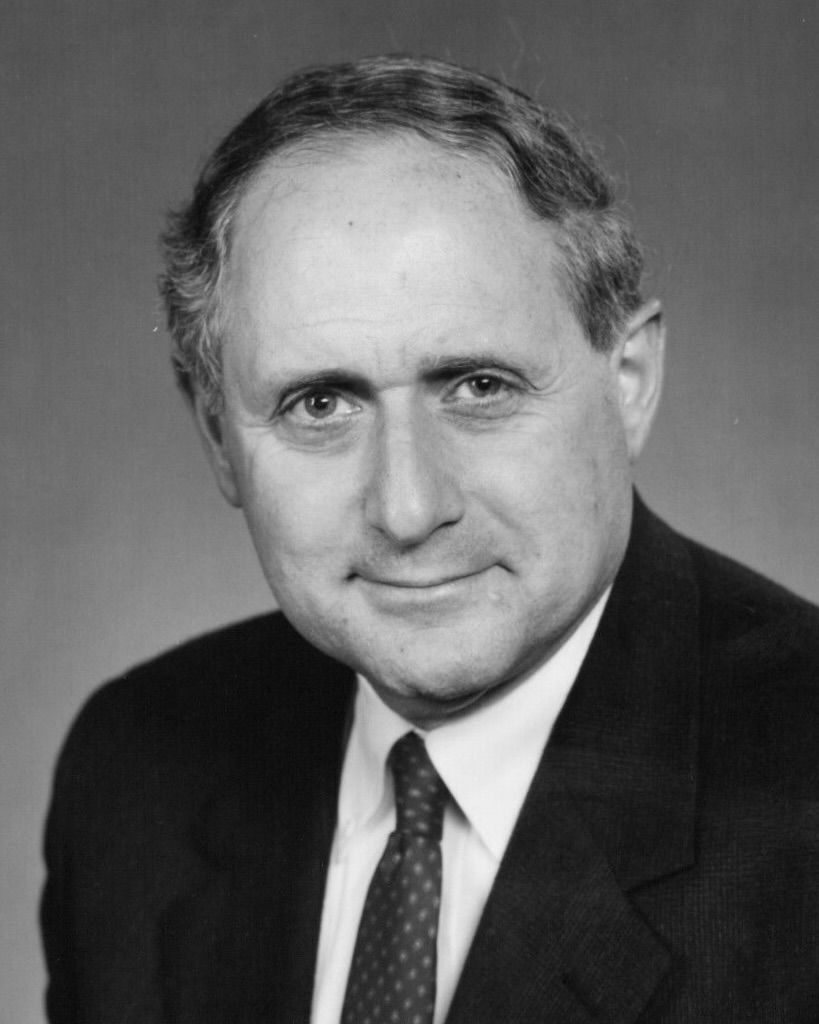

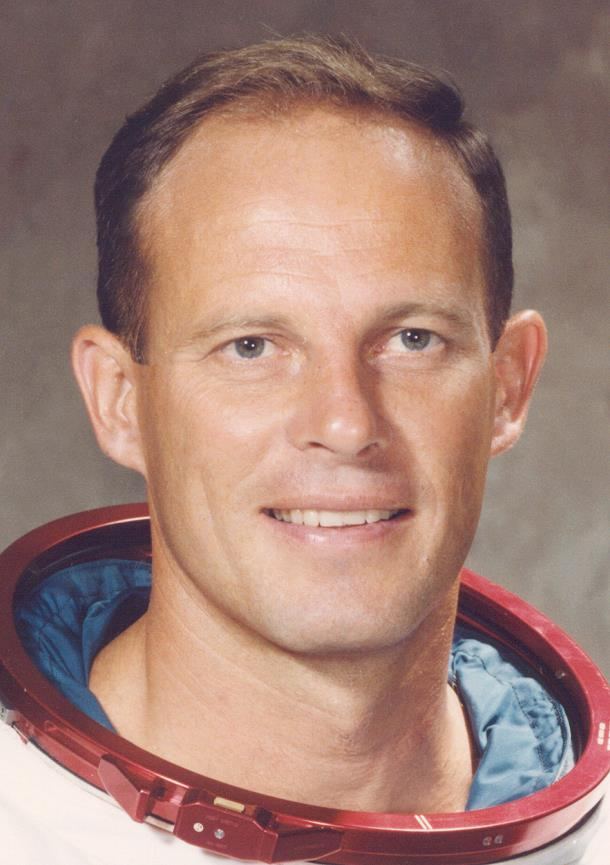
Nominee	Carl Levin	Jack Lousma
Party	Democratic	Republican
Popular vote	1,915,831	1,745,302
Percentage	51.77%	47.16%
- Levin: 40–50% 50–60% 60–70% 70–80% 80–90% >90% Lousma: 40–50% 50–60% 60–70% 70–80% 80–90% >90% Tie: 40–50% 50%
U.S. senator before election
Carl Levin
Democratic
Elected U.S. Senator
Carl Levin
Democratic

The 1984 United States Senate election in Michigan was held on November 6, 1984. Incumbent Democratic U.S. Senator Carl Levin won re-election to a second term, defeating Republican candidate and former astronaut Jack Lousma. Coinciding with Republican Ronald Reagan's landslide in Michigan and the rest of the country, this was the only Senate election of Levin's career in which his percentage of the vote and margin of victory decreased from the previous one. This was also Levin’s last Senate election where he won less than 57% of votes.

== General election ==
=== Candidates ===
- Max Dean (Independent)
- Lynn Johnston (Libertarian)
- Carl Levin, incumbent Senator (Democratic)
- Jack Lousma, astronaut (Republican)
- Fred Mazelis (Workers' League)
- Helen Meyers (Socialist)
- William Roundtree (Workers' World)
- Arthur Richard Tisch (Tisch Citizens)
- Samuel L. Webb (Communist)

=== Results ===
General election results
Party	Candidate	Votes	%
Democratic	Carl Levin (incumbent)	1,915,831	51.77%
Republican	Jack Lousma	1,745,302	47.16%
Tisch Citizens	Arthur Richard Tisch	22,882	0.62%
Libertarian	Lynn Johnston	7,786	0.21%
Socialist	Helen Meyers	2,686	0.07%
Workers World	William Roundtree	2,279	0.06%
Independent	Max Dean	2,135	0.06%
Communist	Samuel L. Webb	1,196	0.03%
Workers League	Fred Mazelis	818	0.02%
Total votes		3,700,915	100.00%
Democratic hold			

== See also ==
- 1984 United States Senate elections
