= Ronna Romney =

American politician (born 1943)

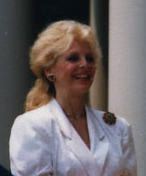

Personal details
- Born: Ronna Eileen Stern; September 24, 1943 (age 83) Detroit, Michigan, U.S.
- Party: Republican
- Spouse(s): 3, including Scott Romney (m. 1967; div. 1992) Bruce Kulp
- Children: 5, including Ronna
- Relatives: Romney family
- Education: Stanford University (attended); Michigan State University (attended); Oakland University (BA); Harvard University (attended)

Ronna Eileen Romney (née Stern; born September 24, 1943) is an American Republican politician and former radio talk show host.

== Early life and family ==
Romney, née Stern, was born in Detroit, Michigan to parents Eileen Boyd and James Albert Stern. She graduated from Seaholm High School in Birmingham, Michigan in 1961. Romney received a bachelor's degree from Oakland University. She also attended Michigan State University.

In 1967, Stern married G. Scott Romney, a son of George W. Romney, the former chairman and president of AMC and the then-Governor of Michigan, and Lenore Romney, the then-First Lady of Michigan and later candidate for the U.S. Senate. They were married in a traditional sealing ceremony at the Salt Lake Temple of the Church of Jesus Christ of Latter-day Saints. Stern was 23 years old, divorced, and had a three-year-old son. She had converted to Mormonism after meeting Scott. They would divorce in 1992.

Through her ex-husband, she was the sister-in-law of Mitt Romney, who would later serve as Governor of Massachusetts (2003-2007) and U.S. Senator from Utah (2019-2025), and was the 2012 Republican nominee for president.

Ronna Stern Romney's sister, Terry (Stern) Rakolta, gained prominence as an anti-obscenity activist in the late 1980s; Terry's husband, John Rakolta, is a Detroit businessman who served as U.S. ambassador to the United Arab Emirates from 2019 to 2021, and was a national finance chair for Mitt Romney's 2008 and 2012 presidential campaigns.

== Career ==
Romney began her political career with extensive involvement in political fundraising, advising, and volunteering. One of her earliest roles was serving as campaign finance chairman for Richard Headlee's unsuccessful campaign during the 1982 gubernatorial election. Headlee was a former campaign manager for George W. Romney, and a prominent Mormon in Michigan. Ronna went on to serve as a Commissioner of the President's National Advisory Council on Adult Education under President Ronald Reagan from 1982 to 1985. Romney served as an RNC committeewoman from Michigan from 1984 to 1992, and served as an alternate delegate to the 1988 Republican National Convention. She served as a Michigan finance co-chair for the Reagan/Bush campaign in the 1984 presidential election. She was also charter member of GOPAC, an influential Republican political action committee, that year. She also served as Chairwoman of the President's Commission on White House Presidential Scholars from 1985 to 1989. In 1986, she served as co-chairman for Michigan, treasurer for Michigan, and as a member of the national finance steering committee for the political action committee Fund For America's Future. Romney was a member of the national steering committee of Bush for President campaign in 1988. She also served as a finance co-chair on that campaign.

Romney has twice been a candidate for the U.S. Senate. In 1994, then a conservative radio talk show host and two years following her divorce from Scott Romney, she narrowly lost the Republican primary to Spencer Abraham. Her former father-in-law Governor George W. Romney endorsed Abraham in the primary having promised Abraham his endorsement prior to his former daughter-in-law's candidacy. Romney's former brother-in-law Mitt Romney, then a candidate for the United States Senate in Massachusetts, returned to Michigan to help campaign for her. Romney's daughter, the future Chairman of the Republican National Committee Ronna Romney McDaniel, volunteered as a driver during her campaign. Abraham would serve one term in the United States Senate and become the 10th United States Secretary of Energy.

Romney was again a candidate for the United States Senate in 1996. She narrowly defeated businessman James B. Nicholson in the Republican primary to secure the nomination. In the general election, Romney lost to incumbent Senator Carl Levin by a large margin.

Romney has written two books. She co-authored a book, Momentum: Women in American Politics Now in 1988. Romney had previously co-authored a book on marriage, Giving Time a Chance: The Secret of Lasting Marriage in 1985 prior to her second divorce.

After failing to win a place in the United States Senate, Romney returned to the private sector and remarried. She has served on the Board of Directors of Molina Healthcare since 1999. Romney has also served as a director of Park-Ohio Holdings Corporation since 2001. She is currently married to Bruce Kulp and resides in Northville, Michigan and Longboat Key, Florida. Romney has continued to donate thousands of dollars to Republican candidates for office. She has also campaigned for her relatives. Romney campaigned for her former husband, Scott, in his unsuccessful primary campaign for Michigan Attorney General in 1998. Romney aggressively campaigned and fundraised for Mitt Romney's 2012 presidential campaign. Romney remains a best friend of Mitt's wife, Ann Romney.

Romney's daughter, Ronna Romney McDaniel, has followed her mother into politics. Romney McDaniel is the Chairman of the Republican National Committee, and has served as a Michigan RNC Committeewoman, Chairman of the Michigan Republican Party, and a delegate for Donald Trump at the 2016 Republican National Convention.

== See also ==
- Pratt-Romney family

Party political offices
Preceded by Bill Schuette	Republican nominee for U.S. Senator from Michigan (Class 3); 1996	Succeeded by Rocky Raczkowski
