= Martina A. Strong =

American diplomat

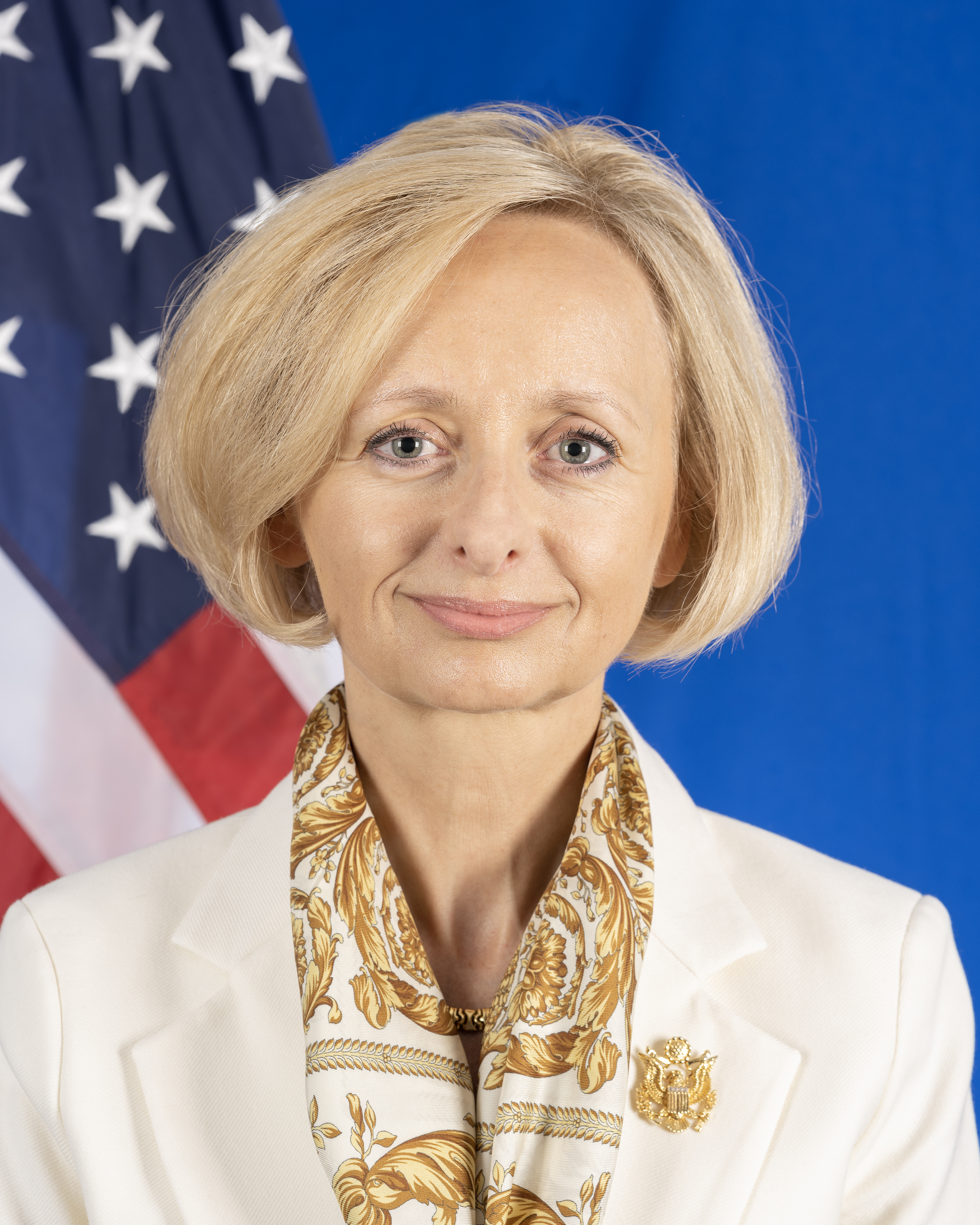

United States Ambassador to the United Arab Emirates
- In office October 4, 2023 – August 5, 2025
- President: Joe Biden; Donald Trump
- Preceded by: John Rakolta

United States Chargé d’Affaires to Saudi Arabia
- In office January 20, 2021 – April 16, 2023
- President: Joe Biden
- Preceded by: John Abizaid
- Succeeded by: Michael Ratney

Personal details
- Born: Martina Anna Tkadlec Strong
- Education: Southern Methodist University (BA); University of California, Berkeley (MA)

Martina Anna Tkadlec Strong is an American diplomat who had served as the United States ambassador to the United Arab Emirates. She previously served as the Chargé d'Affaires to Saudi Arabia from January 20, 2021 until April 16, 2023.

== Early life and education ==
Strong earned a Bachelor of Arts degree from Southern Methodist University and a Master of Arts degree from the University of California, Berkeley.

== Career ==
Strong is a career member of the Senior Foreign Service, with the rank of Minister-Counselor. She served as the chargé d'affaires ad interim at the U.S. Embassy in Riyadh, Saudi Arabia from January 20, 2021 until April 16, 2023. She previously served as the Deputy Chief of Mission and also chargé d'affaires ad interim at the U.S. Embassy in Sofia, Bulgaria, and she also served as the Minister Counselor for Political and Political-Military Affairs at the U.S. Embassy in Baghdad, Iraq. Strong served as Counselor for Political-Economic Affairs at the U.S. Embassy in Warsaw, Poland, and as a Political Advisor in Basra, Iraq. Strong also was the Deputy Counselor for Political-Economic Affairs at the U.S. Embassies in Prague, Czech Republic and in Bridgetown, Barbados. Domestically, she served as Director for the G-8 on the White House National Security Council in Washington, D.C.

=== U.S. ambassador to the United Arab Emirates ===
On September 16, 2022, President Joe Biden nominated Strong to be the next ambassador to the United Arab Emirates. Her nomination expired at the end of the year and was returned to President Biden on January 3, 2023.

President Biden renominated Strong the same day. Hearings on her nomination were held before the Senate Foreign Relations Committee on March 15, 2023. The committee favorably reported her nomination to the Senate floor on April 27, 2023. It was confirmed by the full United States Senate on July 27, 2023, via voice vote. Ambassador Strong presented her credentials to President of the United Arab Emirates Sheikh Mohamed bin Zayed Al Nahyan on October 4, 2023.

== Personal life ==
Strong speaks Arabic, Czech, Polish, French, German, Russian, and Bosnian.
