= 1978 United States Senate election in Michigan =

- November 7, 1978
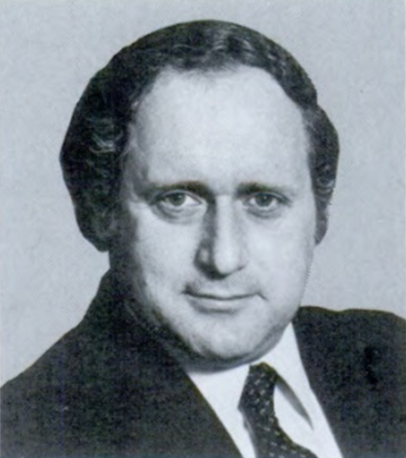

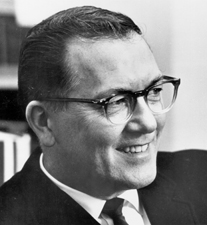
Nominee	Carl Levin	Robert P. Griffin
Party	Democratic	Republican
Popular vote	1,484,193	1,362,165
Percentage	52.14%	47.85%
- County results Levin: 50–60% 60–70% Griffin: 50–60% 60–70%
U.S. senator before election
Robert P. Griffin
Republican
Elected U.S. Senator
Carl Levin
Democratic

The 1978 United States Senate election in Michigan was held on November 7, 1978. Incumbent Republican U.S. Senator Robert P. Griffin ran for re-election to a third full term and lost to the Democratic nominee, Detroit City Council President Carl Levin. Griffin was later elected to Michigan's State Supreme Court in 1986.

== Republican primary ==
=== Candidates ===
- Robert P. Griffin, incumbent U.S. Senator since 1967
- L. Brooks Patterson, Oakland County Prosecutor and anti-busing activist

=== Results ===
1978 Republican U.S. Senate primary
Party	Candidate	Votes	%
Republican	Robert P. Griffin (incumbent)	322,530	78.30%
Republican	L. Brooks Patterson	89,383	21.70%
Write-in		22	0.01%
Total votes		411,935	100.00%

== Democratic primary ==
=== Candidates ===
- Anthony Derezinski, State Senator from Ann Arbor
- Carl Levin, President of the Detroit City Council
- John Otterbacher, State Senator from Grand Rapids
- Phil Power, newspaper publisher
- Paul Rosenbaum, State Representative from Battle Creek
- Richard Vander Veen, former U.S. Representative from Grand Rapids

=== Results ===
1978 Democratic U.S. Senate primary
Party	Candidate	Votes	%
Democratic	Carl Levin	226,584	38.90%
Democratic	Phil Power	115,117	19.77%
Democratic	Richard Vander Veen	89,257	15.33%
Democratic	Anthony Derezinski	53,696	9.22%
Democratic	John Otterbacher	50,860	8.73%
Democratic	Paul Rosenbaum	46,892	8.05%
Write-in		23	0.00%
Total votes		582,429	100.00%

== Results ==
General election results
Party	Candidate	Votes	%	±%
Democratic	Carl Levin	1,484,193	52.14%	▲5.85
Republican	Robert P. Griffin (incumbent)	1,362,165	47.85%	▼4.43
Write-in		272	0.01%	N/A
Total votes		2,846,630	100.00%	N/A
Democratic gain from Republican				

== See also ==
- 1978 United States Senate elections
