= 1996 United States Senate election in Michigan =

- November 5, 1996
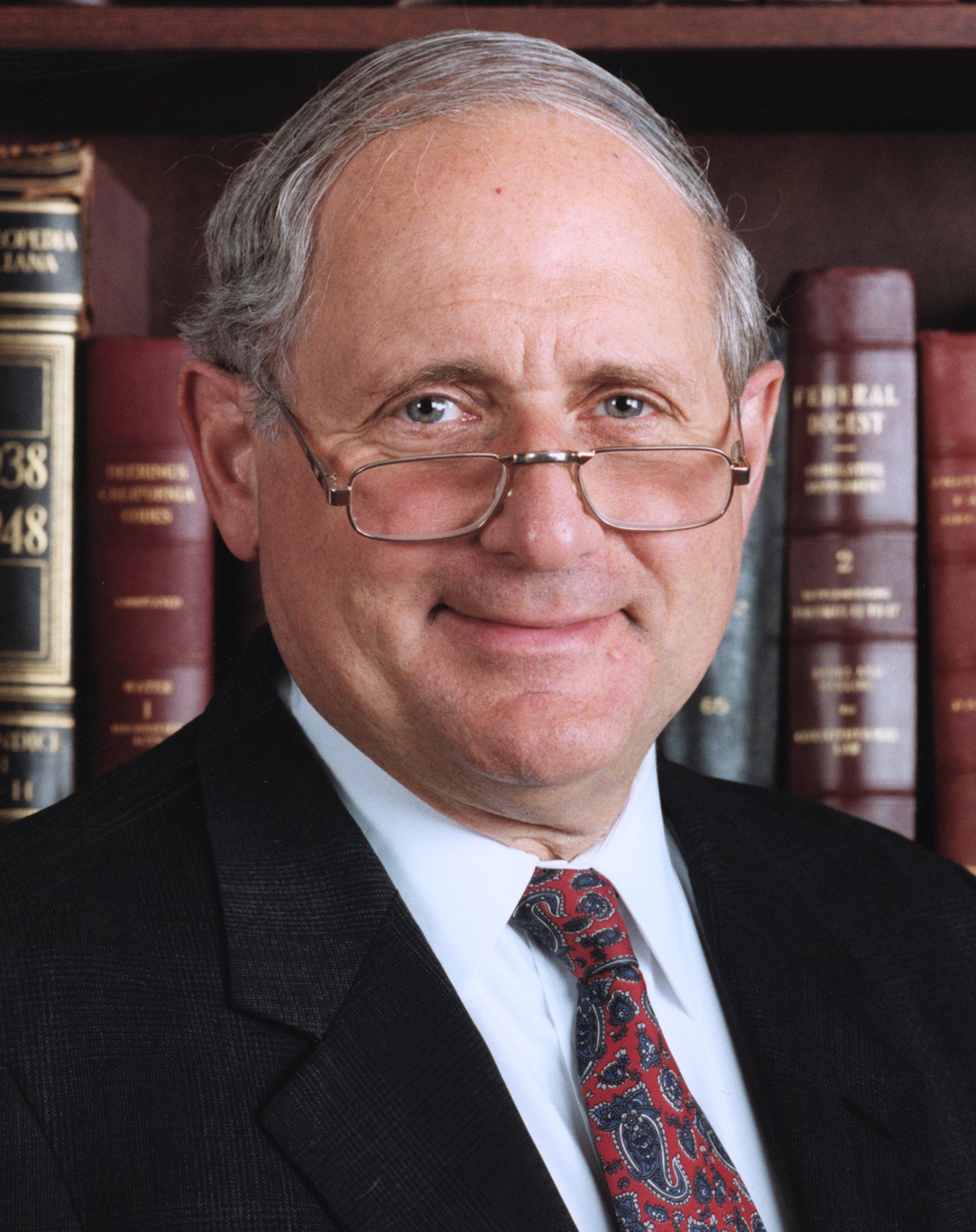

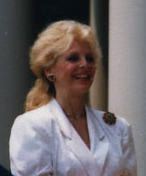
| Nominee | Carl Levin | Ronna Romney |
| Party | Democratic | Republican |
| Popular vote | 2,195,738 | 1,500,106 |
| Percentage | 58.36% | 39.88% |
- County results Levin: 40–50% 50–60% 60–70% 70–80% Romney: 40–50% 50–60% 60–70%
U.S. senator before election
Carl Levin
Democratic
Elected U.S. Senator
Carl Levin
Democratic

The 1996 United States Senate election in Michigan was held on November 5, 1996. Incumbent Democratic U.S. Senator Carl Levin won re-election to a fourth term.

== General election ==
=== Candidates ===
- Carl Levin, incumbent U.S. Senator (Democratic)
- Joseph S. Mattingly (Natural Law)
- Martin P. McLaughlin (Socialist)
- Kenneth L. Proctor (Libertarian)
- Ronna Romney, radio talk show host and former daughter-in-law of Michigan governor George W. Romney (Republican)
- William Roundtree (Workers' World)

=== Results ===
General election results
| Party | Candidate | Votes | % |
|---|---|---|---|
| Democratic | Carl Levin (incumbent) | 2,195,738 | 58.36% |
| Republican | Ronna Romney | 1,500,450 | 39.88% |
| Libertarian | Kenneth L. Proctor | 20,911 | 0.56% |
| Workers World | William Roundtree | 12,235 | 0.33% |
| Natural Law | Joseph S. Mattingly | 11,306 | 0.30% |
| Socialist | Martin P. McLaughlin | 5,975 | 0.16% |
| Total votes | | 3,762,271 | 100.0% |
| Democratic hold | | | |

== See also ==
- 1996 United States Senate elections
