= Jack R. Lousma =

American astronaut and politician (born 1936)

Jack Lousma
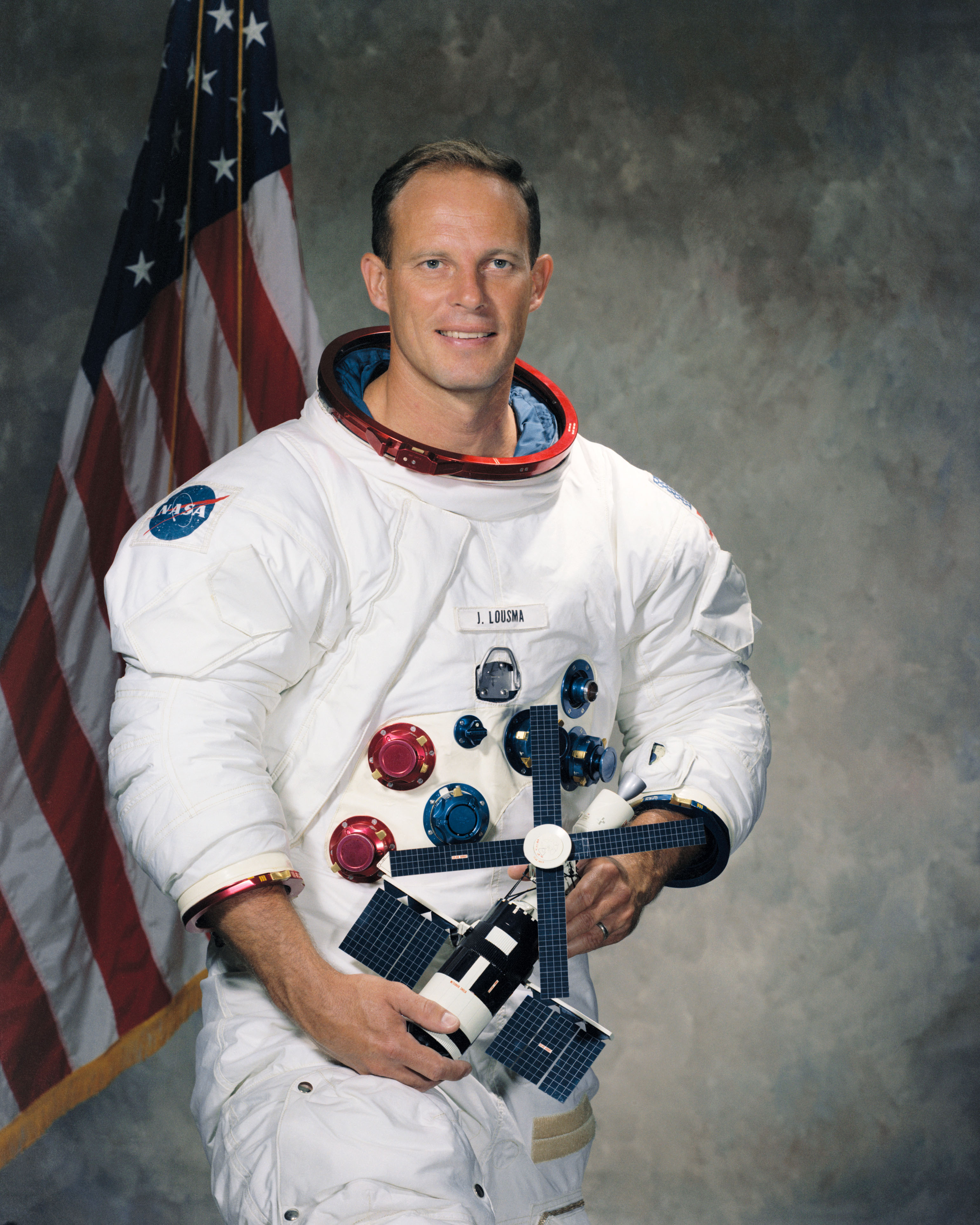
- Lousma in 1971
- Born: Jack Robert Lousma; February 29, 1936 (age 90); Grand Rapids, Michigan, U.S.
- Education: University of Michigan (BS); Naval Postgraduate School (MS)
- Spouse: Gratia Kay (m. 1956)
- Children: 4
- Awards: NASA Distinguished Service Medal
- Space career

NASA astronaut
- Rank: Colonel, USMC
- Time in space: 67d 11h 13m
- Selection: NASA Group 5 (1966)
- Total EVAs: 2
- Total EVA time: 11h 1m
- Missions: Skylab-3; STS-3
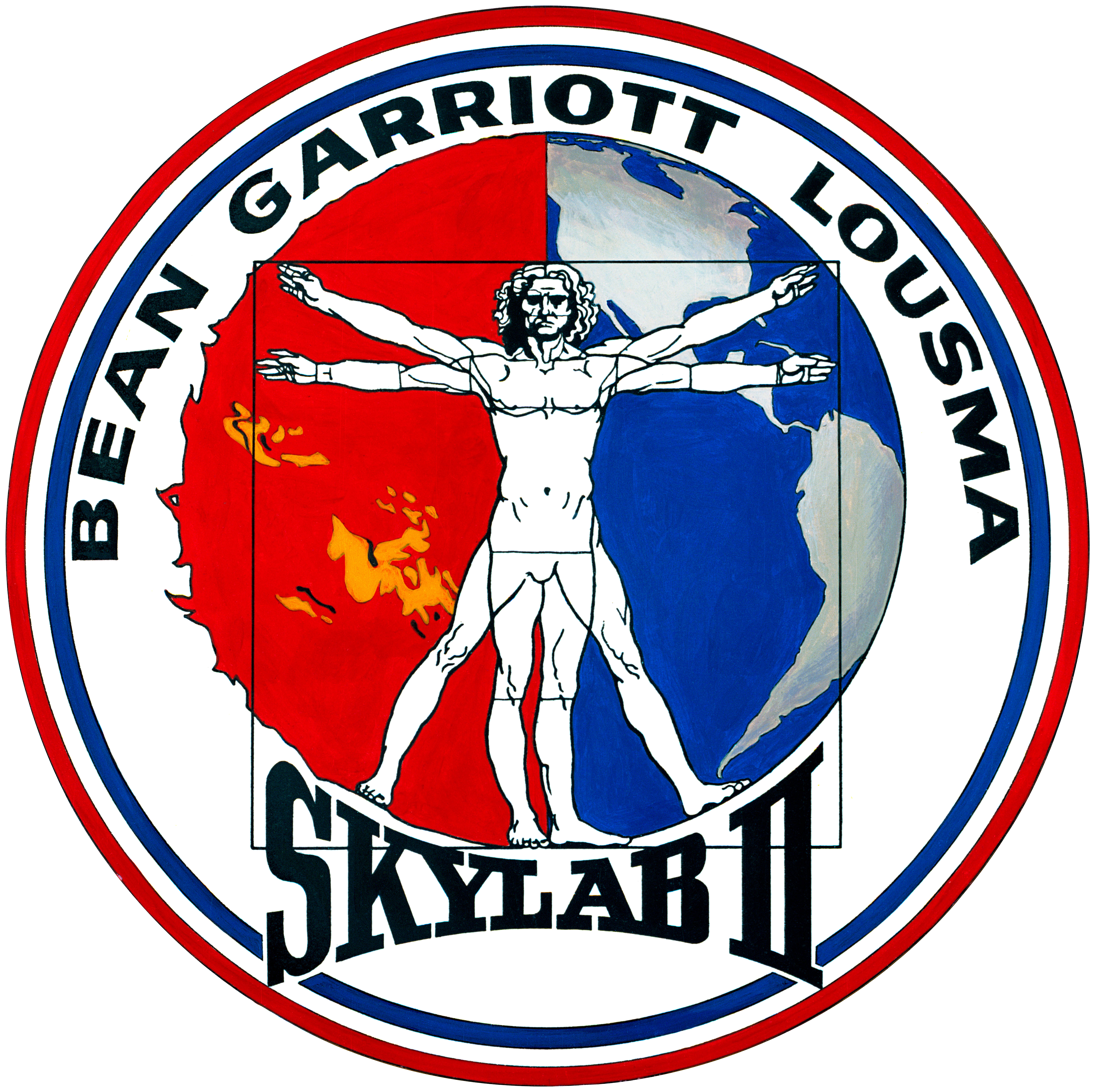
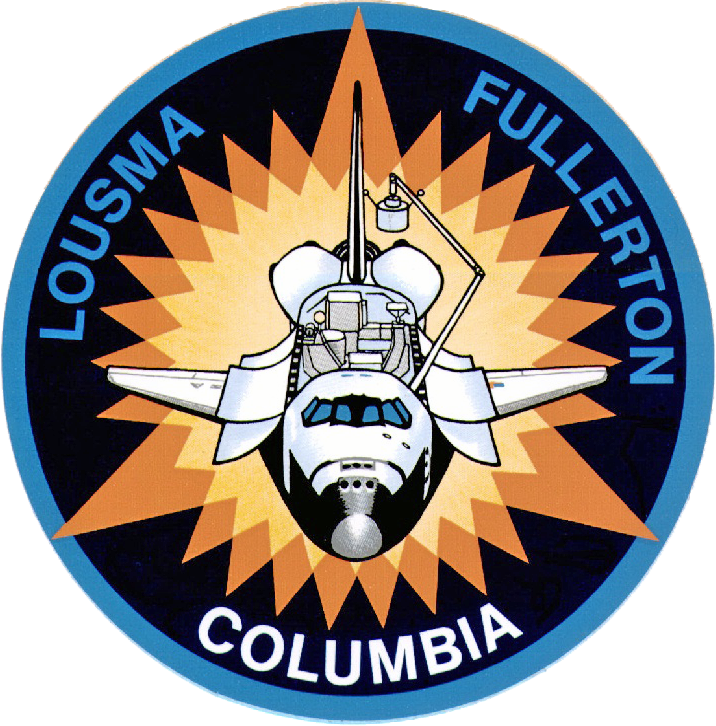
- Mission insignia
- Retired: October 1, 1983

Jack Robert Lousma (born February 29, 1936) is an American astronaut, aeronautical engineer, retired United States Marine Corps officer, former naval aviator, NASA astronaut, and politician. He was a member of the second crew, Skylab-3, on the Skylab space station in 1973. In 1982, he commanded STS-3, the third Space Shuttle mission. Lousma was inducted into the United States Astronaut Hall of Fame in 1997. He is the last living crew member of both of his spaceflights.

Lousma later was the Republican Party nominee for a seat in the United States Senate from Michigan in 1984, losing to incumbent Carl Levin, who won his second of six terms.

== Early life and education ==
Lousma was born in Grand Rapids, Michigan, on February 29, 1936. He is of Dutch (Frisian) descent. His father's name was spelled Louwsma, but he kept the 'w' off of his son's birth certificate to make the name easier to spell. He graduated from Angell Elementary School, Tappan Middle School, and Pioneer High School in Ann Arbor, Michigan in 1954. Lousma was a Boy Scout and earned the rank of Tenderfoot Scout.

Lousma received a Bachelor of Science degree in aeronautical engineering from the University of Michigan in 1959. He played on the football team as a backup quarterback until an elbow injury ended his career. He earned a Master of Science degree in aeronautical engineering from the U.S. Naval Postgraduate School in 1965.

== Military service ==
Lousma became a United States Marine Corps officer in 1959, and he received his aviator wings in 1960 after completing training at the Naval Air Training Command. He was then assigned to VMA-224, 2nd Marine Aircraft Wing (2nd MAW), as an attack pilot, and he later served with VMA-224, 1st Marine Air Wing, at Marine Corps Air Station Iwakuni, Japan. He was a reconnaissance pilot with VMCJ-2, 2nd MAW, at Marine Corps Air Station Cherry Point, North Carolina, before being assigned to the Manned Spacecraft Center in Houston, Texas.

Lousma has logged 7,000 hours of flight time; including 700 hours in general aviation aircraft, 1,619 hours in space, 4,500 hours in jet aircraft, and 240 hours in helicopters.

== NASA career ==
Lousma was one of the 19 astronauts selected in NASA Astronaut Group 5 in April 1966. He served as a member of the astronaut support crews for the Apollo 9, 10, and 13 missions. He was the CAPCOM recipient of the "Houston, we've had a problem" message from Apollo 13. He was a potential candidate to serve as lunar module pilot for Apollo 20, which was cancelled due to budget cuts. He was the pilot for Skylab-3 from July 28 to September 25, 1973, and was commander on STS-3, from March 22 until March 30, 1982, logging a total of over 1,619 hours in space.

Lousma also spent 11 hours on two spacewalks outside the Skylab space station. He served as backup docking module pilot of the United States flight crew for the Apollo-Soyuz Test Project mission, which was completed successfully in July 1975.

=== Skylab 3 ===
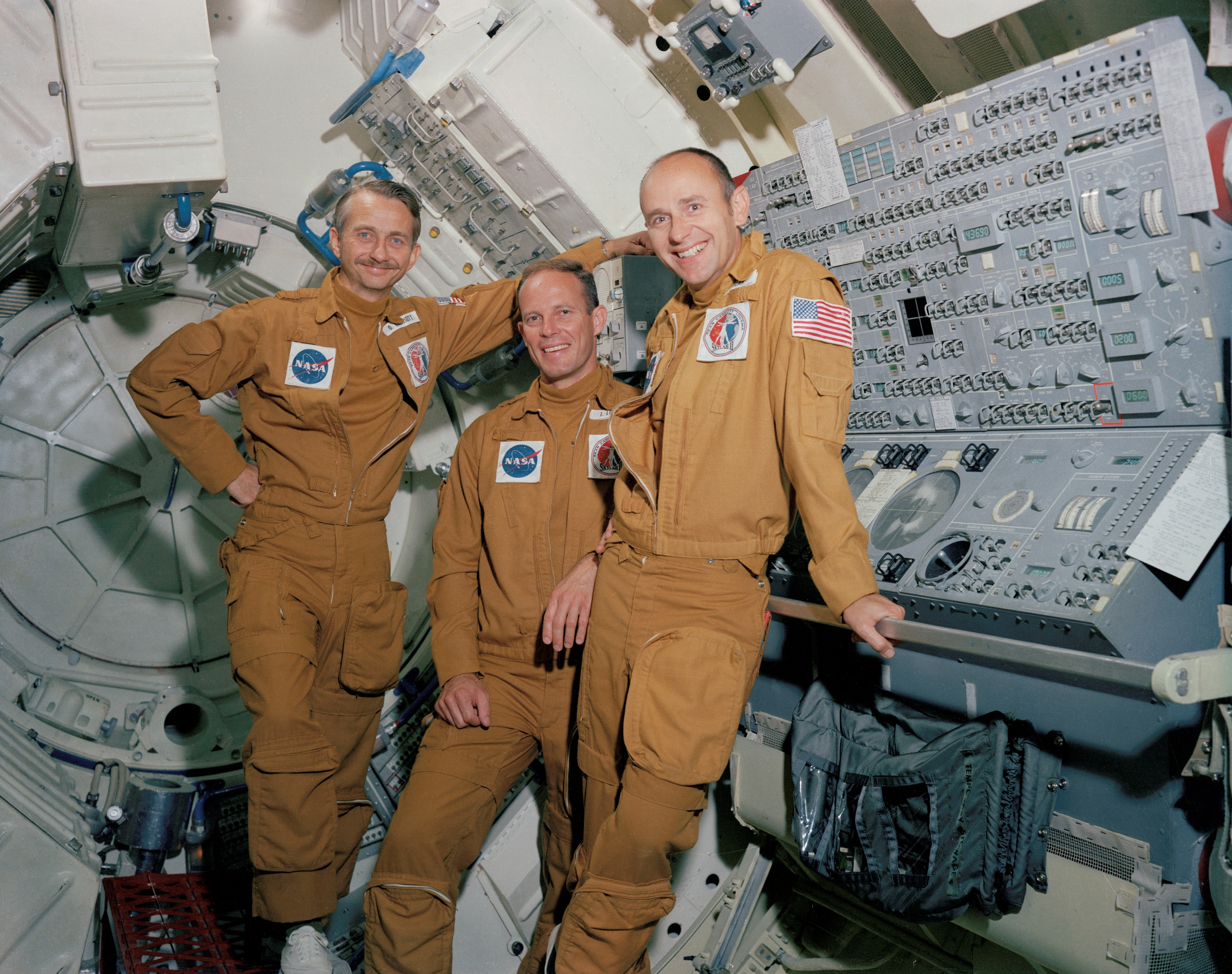
The Skylab-3 crew, Owen K. Garriott, Jack R. Lousma, and Alan Bean

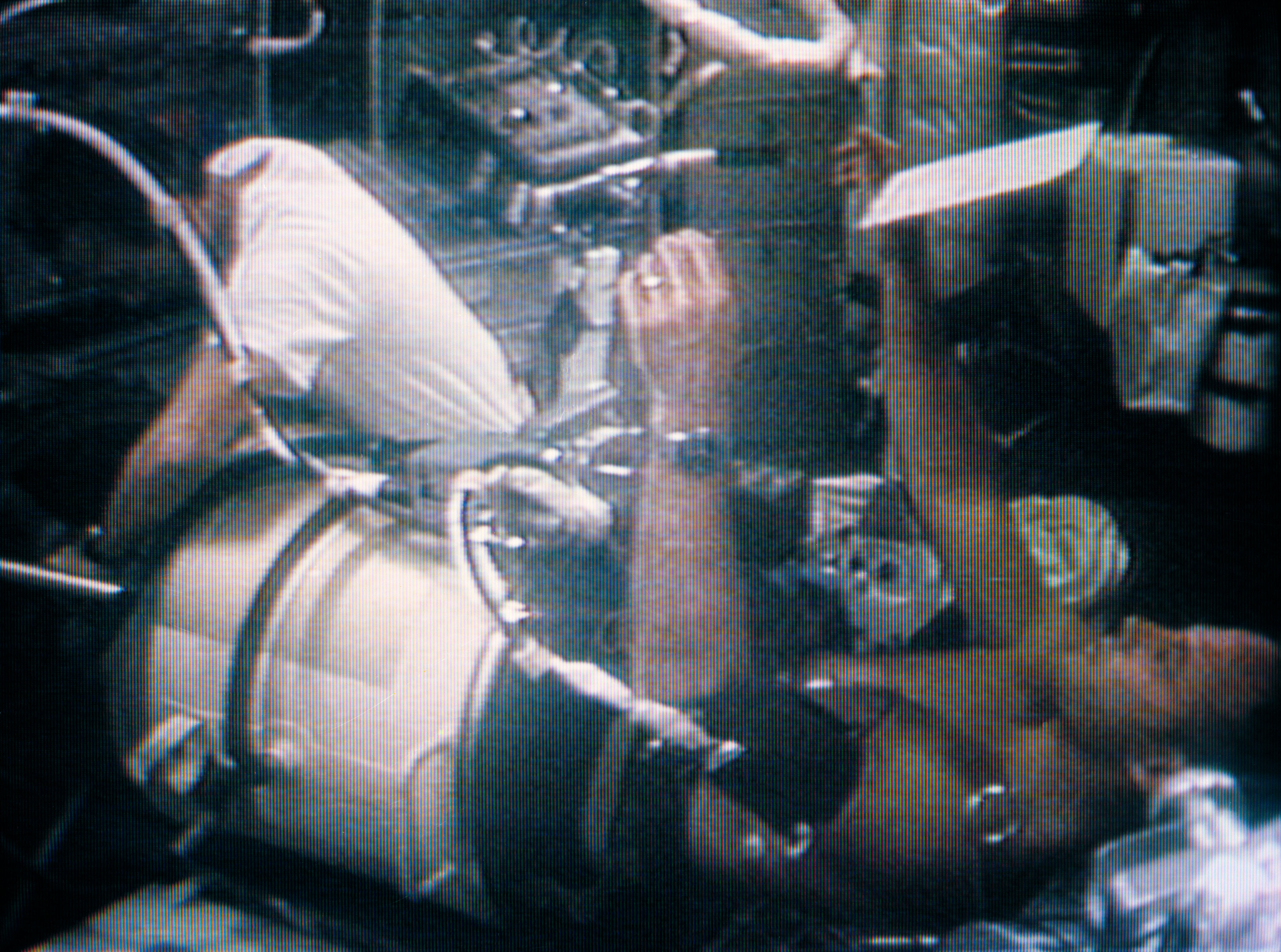
Lousma during one of the experiments aboard the Skylab-3

The crew on this 59½ day flight included Alan Bean (spacecraft commander), Lousma (pilot), and Owen K. Garriott, who acted as a science-pilot. The crew installed six replacement rate gyroscopes used for attitude control of the spacecraft and a twin-pole sunshade used for thermal control, and they repaired nine major experiment or operational equipment items. Skylab-3 accomplished all its mission goals while completing 858 revolutions of the Earth, and traveling some 39,300,000 km (24,400,000 mi) in orbit. They devoted 305 man-hours to extensive solar observations from above the atmosphere, which included viewing two major solar flares and numerous smaller flares and coronal transients. Also acquired and returned to Earth were 16,000 photographs and 29 km (18 mi) of magnetic tape documenting Earth resources observations. The crew completed 333 medical experiment performances and obtained valuable data on the effects of extended weightlessness on humans. Skylab-3 ended with a Pacific Ocean splashdown and recovery by USS New Orleans.

=== STS-3 ===
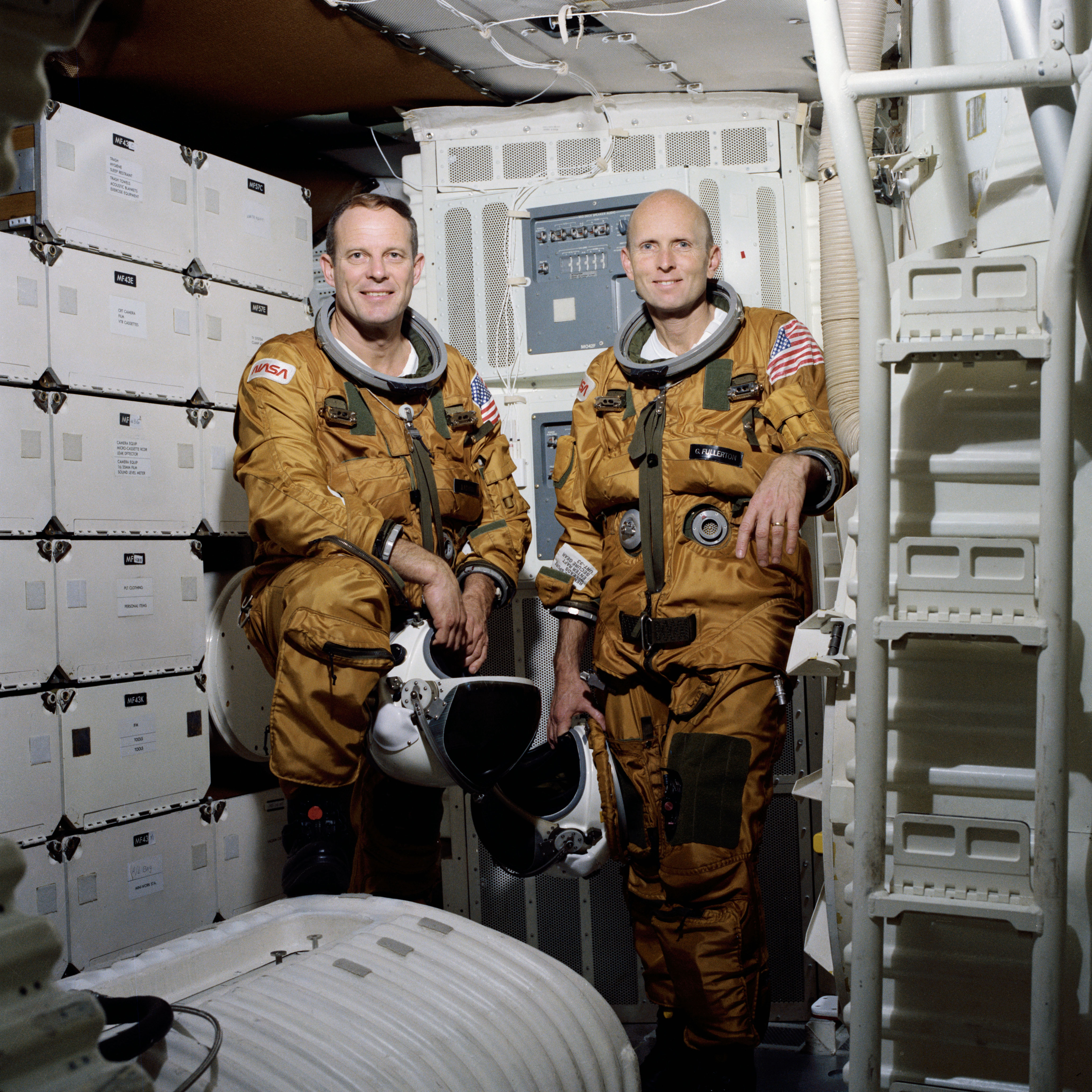
The STS-3 crew, Jack Lousma and Gordon Fullerton

Lousma was originally selected as the pilot of the two-man crew of STS-2, alongside commander Fred Haise. This was a planned mission scheduled to launch in mid-1979, which was intended to use the Teleoperator Retrieval System to boost the orbit of Skylab, to allow for the space station's potential further use. This mission was eventually scrubbed, owing to the delays in getting the Shuttle system ready for flight. As a result, following Haise's decision to leave NASA, Lousma was named as commander of STS-3.

STS-3, the third orbital test flight of Space Shuttle Columbia, launched from the Kennedy Space Center, Florida, on March 22, 1982, into a 290 km (180 mi) circular orbit above the Earth. Lousma was the spacecraft commander and C. Gordon Fullerton was the pilot on this eight-day mission. Major flight test objectives included exposing Columbia to extremes in thermal stress and the first use of the 15 m (49 ft) Remote Manipulator System (RMS) to grapple and maneuver a Payload in space. The crew also operated several scientific experiments in the orbiter's cabin and on the OSS-1 pallet in the payload bay. Columbia responded favorably to the thermal tests and was found to be better than expected as a scientific platform. The crew accomplished almost all the mission objectives assigned, and after a one-day delay due to bad weather, landed on the lake bed at White Sands, New Mexico, on March 30, 1982, the only shuttle flight to land there. Columbia traveled 5,500,000 km (3,400,000 mi) during 129.9 orbits and mission duration was 192 hours, 4 minutes, 49 seconds. Lousma left NASA on October 1, 1983, and retired from the Marine Corps on November 1, 1983.

== Political experience ==
A Republican, Lousma lost the 1984 United States Senate election in Michigan against incumbent Carl Levin, receiving 47% of the vote. The astronaut-politician survived a bitter primary fight against former Republican congressman Jim Dunn to capture the nomination with 63% of the vote. Ronald Reagan's landslide re-election was a boon to Lousma, but he nonetheless lost the election, coming in with 47.16% of the vote to Levin's 51.77%.

== Personal life ==
Lousma and Gratia Kay were married in 1956. They have four children. A long-time resident of Scio Township, near Ann Arbor, Michigan, he moved with his wife to Texas in September 2013.

== Awards and honors ==
Lousma was awarded the Johnson Space Center Certificate of Commendation (1970); the NASA Distinguished Service Medal (1973); presented the Navy Distinguished Service Medal and Navy Astronaut Wings (1974), the City of Chicago Gold Medal (1974), the Marine Corps Aviation Association's Exceptional Achievement Award (1974), the Fédération Aéronautique Internationale awarded him the V. M. Komarov Diploma for 1973, the AIAA Octave Chanute Award for 1975, the AAS Flight Achievement Award for 1974; inducted into a second NASA Distinguished Service Medal (1982), the Department of Defense Distinguished Service Medal (1982), NCAA Silver Anniversary Award (1983).

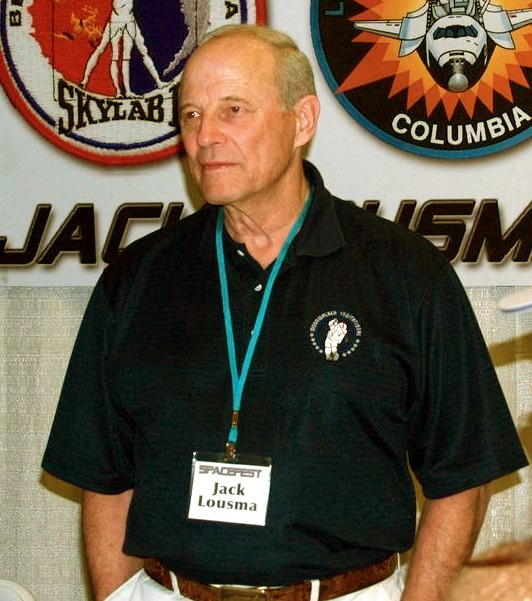
Jack R. Lousma, February 2009

The three Skylab astronaut crews were awarded the 1973 Robert J. Collier Trophy "For proving beyond question the value of man in future explorations of space and the production of data of benefit to all the people on Earth". Gerald P. Carr accepted the 1975 Dr. Robert H. Goddard Memorial Trophy from President Ford, awarded to the Skylab astronauts.

Lousma was inducted with Fullerton into the International Space Hall of Fame during a ceremony with the governor of New Mexico in 1982 for their involvement in the STS-3 mission. The governor also presented them with the International Space Hall of Fame's Pioneer Award, and were the second group to receive this award. He was inducted the Michigan Aviation Hall of Fame in 1989. He was one of 24 Apollo astronauts who were inducted into the U.S. Astronaut Hall of Fame in 1997.

He was presented an honorary doctorate of astronautical science from the University of Michigan in 1973, an honorary D.Sc. from Hope College in 1982, an honorary D.Sc. in business administration from Cleary College in 1986, and an honorary doctorate from Sterling College in 1988.

Lousma has a closed-end street (Lousma Drive) named after him in Wyoming, Michigan (suburb of Grand Rapids) that begins west off of Roger B. Chaffee Memorial Blvd just south of 32nd Street SE, in an industrial park area.

== See also ==
- The Astronaut Monument
- 1984 United States Senate election in Michigan

Party political offices
Preceded by Robert P. Griffin	Republican nominee for U.S. Senator from Michigan (Class 2); 1984	Succeeded by Bill Schuette
