= Carl Levin =

American politician (1934–2021)

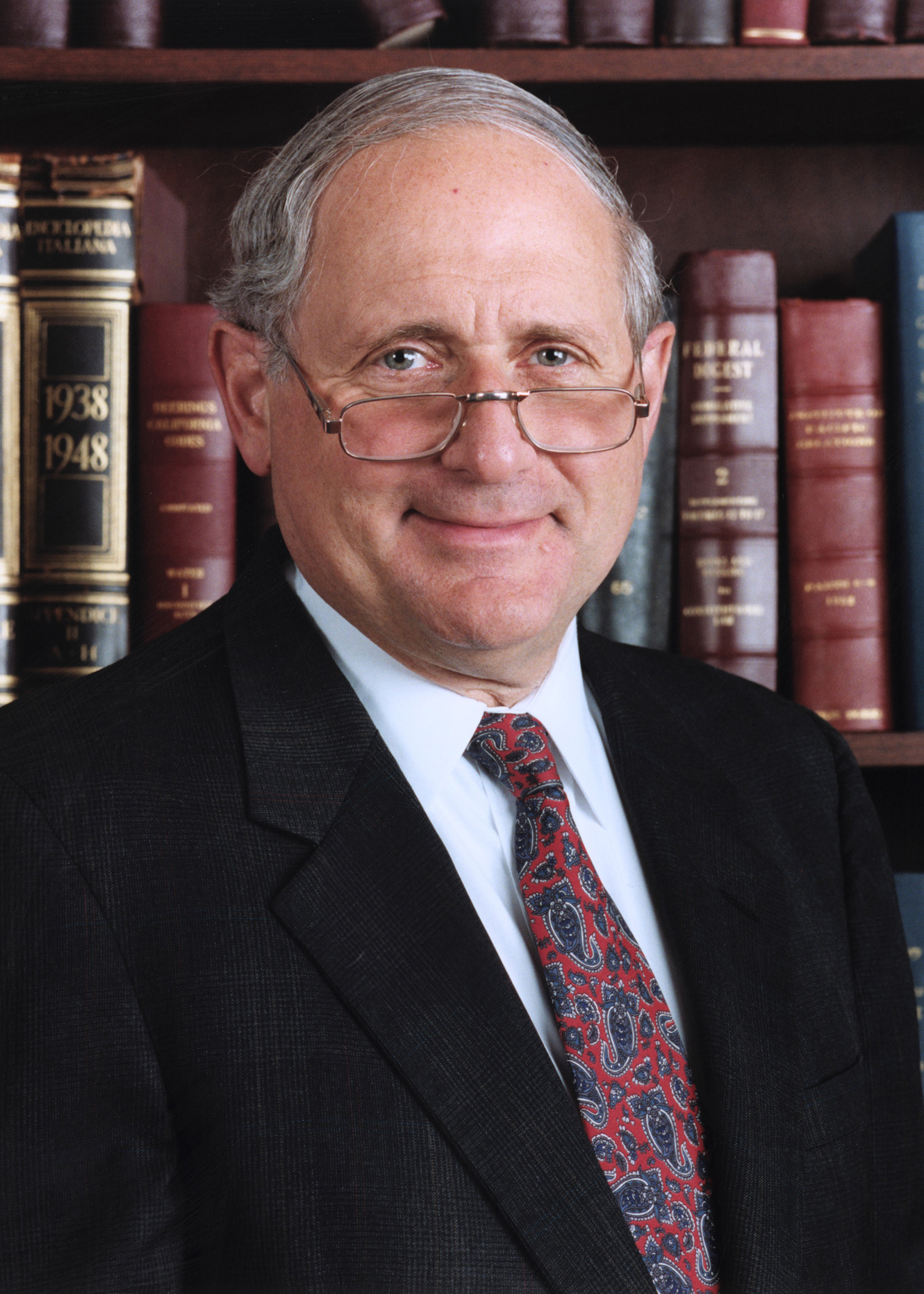
- Official portrait, c. 1990s

United States Senator from Michigan
- In office January 3, 1979 – January 3, 2015
- Preceded by: Robert Griffin
- Succeeded by: Gary Peters
Committee positions
Chair of the Senate Armed Services Committee
In office January 3, 2007 – January 3, 2015
Preceded by	John Warner
Succeeded by	John McCain
In office June 6, 2001 – January 3, 2003
Preceded by	John Warner
Succeeded by	John Warner
In office January 3, 2001 – January 20, 2001
Preceded by	John Warner
Succeeded by	John Warner
Ranking Member of the Senate Armed Services Committee
In office January 3, 2003 – January 3, 2007
Preceded by	John Warner
Succeeded by	John McCain
In office January 20, 2001 – June 6, 2001
Preceded by	John Warner
Succeeded by	John Warner
In office January 3, 1997 – January 3, 2001
Preceded by	Sam Nunn
Succeeded by	John Warner

Member of the Detroit City Council
- In office January 7, 1969 – January 7, 1977
- Preceded by: Ed Carey
- Succeeded by: Kenneth Cockrel Sr.

Personal details
- Born: Carl Milton Levin; June 28, 1934 Detroit, Michigan, U.S.
- Died: July 29, 2021 (aged 87) Detroit, Michigan, U.S.
- Party: Democratic
- Spouse: Barbara Halpern (m. 1961)
- Children: 3
- Relatives: Sander Levin (brother); Andy Levin (nephew)
- Education: Swarthmore College (BA); Harvard University (JD)
- Carl Levin's voice Carl Levin speaks in support of changing U.S. policy in Iraq; Recorded March 15, 2007

Carl Milton Levin (June 28, 1934 – July 29, 2021) was an American attorney and politician who served as a United States senator from Michigan from 1979 to 2015. A member of the Democratic Party, he was the chair of the Senate Armed Services Committee from 2001 to 2003 and again from 2007 to 2015.

Born in Detroit, Levin graduated from Swarthmore College and Harvard Law School. He worked as the general counsel of the Michigan Civil Rights Commission from 1964 to 1967, and as a special assistant attorney general for the Michigan Attorney General's Office. Levin was a member of the Detroit City Council from 1969 to 1977, serving as the council's president for the last four of those years.

In 1978, Levin ran for the United States Senate, defeating Republican incumbent Robert P. Griffin. Levin was re-elected in 1984, 1990, 1996, 2002, and 2008. On March 7, 2013, Levin announced that he would not seek a seventh term. On March 9, 2015, Levin announced he was joining the Detroit-based law firm Honigman Miller Schwartz and Cohn LLP. At the same time, he founded the Levin Center at Wayne State University Law School, dedicated to "strengthening the integrity, transparency, and accountability of public and private institutions by promoting and supporting bipartisan, fact-based oversight; advancing good governance, particularly with respect to the legislative process; and promoting civil discourse on current issues of public policy".

Levin became Michigan's senior senator in 1995, and he was the longest-serving senator in the state's history. At the time of his retirement Levin was the fourth longest-serving incumbent in the U.S. Senate. He released his memoir, Getting to the Heart of the Matter: My 36 Years in the Senate, in March 2021. It was published by Wayne State University Press.

== Early life, education, and career ==
Levin was born in Detroit, the son of Jewish parents, Bess Rachel (née Levinson) and Saul R. Levin. Saul served on the Michigan Corrections Commission. Levin graduated from Detroit Central High School in 1952 and attended Swarthmore College. He graduated with his Bachelor of Arts degree in political science in 1956. During his student summers he worked as a taxi driver and on an auto factory line. He then attended the Harvard Law School, where he earned his Juris Doctor in 1959. He also received an honorary degree from Swarthmore College in 1980, as well as honorary degrees from Michigan State University in 2004, Wayne State University in 2005, Lawrence Technological University in 2006, and Michigan Technological University in 2008.

After earning his Juris Doctor, Levin was admitted to the State Bar of Michigan. He entered private practice as a lawyer for Grossman, Hyman and Grossman and taught law at Wayne State University and the University of Detroit Mercy. Levin served as General Counsel for the Michigan Civil Rights Commission from 1964 to 1967, where he helped form the Detroit Public Defender's Office and led the Appellate Division of that office, which has become the State Appellate Defender's Office. He served as a special assistant attorney general for the state of Michigan and chief appellate defender for the city of Detroit from 1968 to 1969.

=== Detroit City Council ===
Levin was elected to the Detroit City Council (known then as the Detroit Common Council) in 1969, serving two four-year terms from 1970 to 1977. Levin served as president of the City Council throughout his entire second term, until the end of his tenure. During his time as council president, Levin became so frustrated with the U.S. Department of Housing and Urban Development's handling of repossessed houses in Detroit (leading neighborhoods to suffer from significant urban decay), that he and other members of the council, went out with a bulldozer "to help raze some of the houses." He was close to Detroit mayor Coleman Young, the city's first African-American mayor, and was described by Forbes as Mayor Young's "right hand man." During his time on the City Council, Levin practiced law part-time, working as a counsel for the Schlussel, Lifton, Simon, Rands and Kaufman law firm from 1971 to 1973. He later served as the general counsel at Jaffe, Snider, Raitt, Garratt and Heuer, from 1978 to 1979.

== United States Senate ==
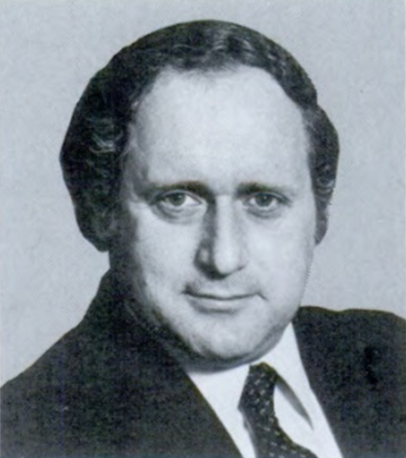
Levin in the late 1980s

Levin was elected to the United States Senate in 1978, defeating incumbent Republican Senator Robert P. Griffin.

=== Committee assignments ===
- Committee on Armed Services (chairman)
  - As chairman of the full committee, Sen. Levin served as an ex officio member of all subcommittees
- Committee on Homeland Security and Governmental Affairs
  - Subcommittee on Federal Financial Management, Government Information, Federal Services, and International Security
  - Subcommittee on Oversight of Government Management, the Federal Workforce, and the District of Columbia (chair)
  - Permanent Subcommittee on Investigations (chair)
- Committee on Small Business and Entrepreneurship
- Select Committee on Intelligence

=== Legislation sponsored ===
Levin was the sponsor of 51 bills that became law.

== Political positions ==
=== Armed services ===
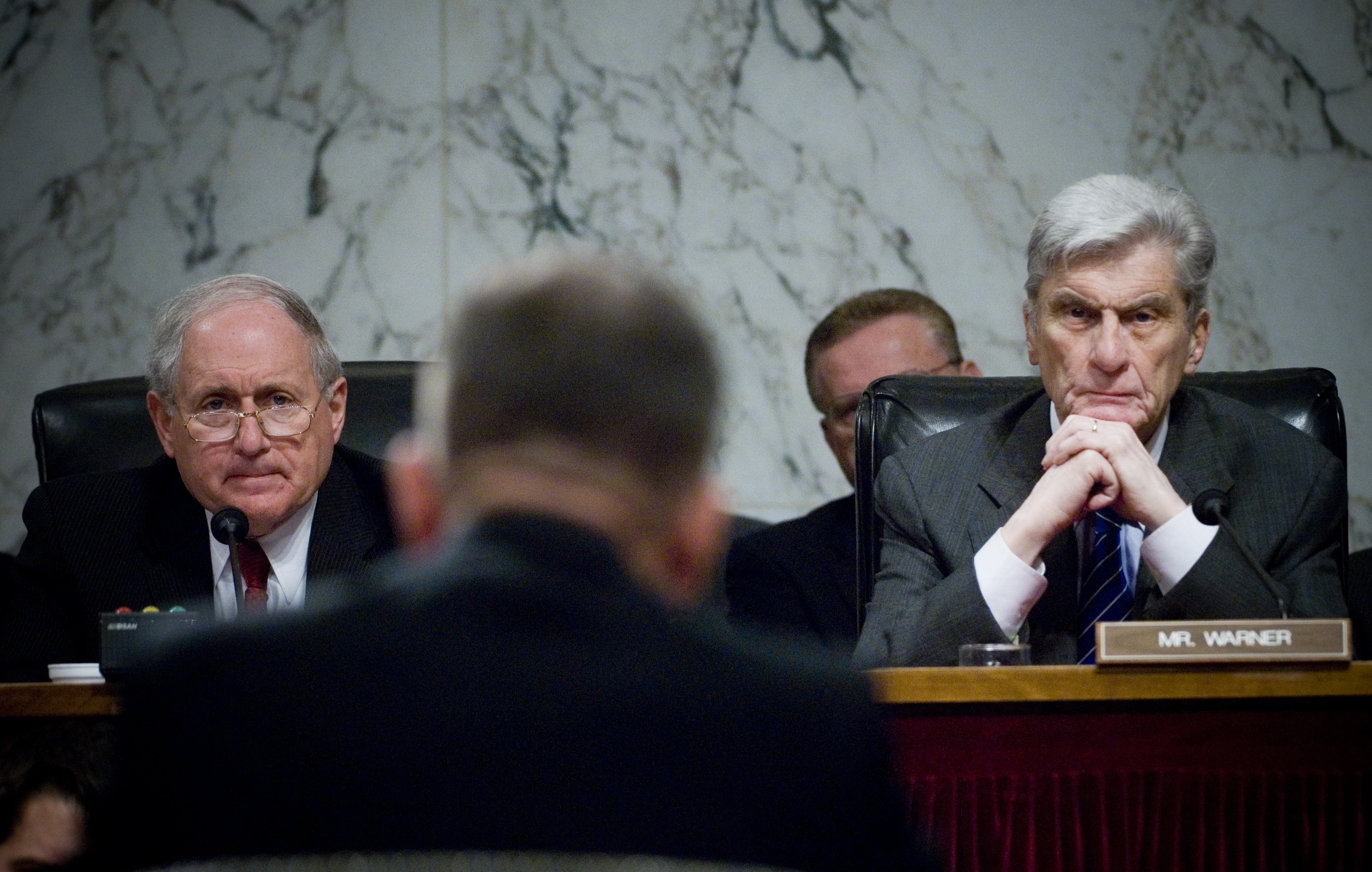
Senator Levin and Senator John Warner (R-VA) listen to Admiral Mike Mullen's 2007 Senate confirmation hearing for becoming Chairman of the Joint Chiefs of Staff. Warner and Levin died two months apart.

Levin chaired the Senate Armed Services Committee from 2001 to 2003 and from 2007 until his retirement in 2015. He became the Democratic ranking member on the committee on January 7, 1997, and served in that position when the Democratic Party was in the minority. Levin previously chaired the committee when the Democratic Party was the majority party in the Senate, January 3–20, 2001 and June 6, 2001 – January 6, 2003.

Levin joined the Armed Services Committee upon joining the Senate. Recalling when he was assigned the committee seat, he said that he wanted to learn more about the armed services. "I had never served, and I thought there was a big gap in terms of my background and, frankly, felt it was a way of providing service."

He was a strong advocate for cost controls regarding military procurements. He has also pushed for less secrecy in government, working to declassify many documents, particularly where false and misleading claims of ties between Iraq and al-Qaeda are concerned.

Having believed that in order to improve the military the United States needed to shut down unneeded installations and get rid of excess infrastructure, Levin helped lead passage of the Defense Base Realignment and Closure Act, which closed some military bases.

Levin supported the Nunn–Lugar Cooperative Threat Reduction Program, ensuring that all nuclear, chemical, and biological weapons from post-Soviet states, are secured and dismantled. Levin argued that Nunn-Lugar presented "a chance to bury the new Hitlers and Stalins of that region before they have a chance to take root." After members of the United States House of Representatives and then-Senator Bob Smith (R-NH) threatened to redirect funds from the Cooperative Threat Reduction Program, Levin joined a bipartisan group of senators in opposition to the 20% reduction in funding. In 2003, he voted in favor of the Nunn-Lugar Expansion Act, expanding the provisions to non-Soviet countries, and in 2005 cosponsored Senate Amendment 1030, removing congressionally imposed restrictions that delay the implementations of 2003 expansion act.

In 1992, he voted to ratify the START I treaty, and for the ratification of START II in 1996, banning MIRV's and Intercontinental ballistic missiles. In 2010, Levin voted in favor of the New START Treaty, extending the original treaty until 2021 and reducing both the U.S. and Russia's deployed strategic nuclear arsenal, by almost two-thirds. In an op-ed in The Hill, Levin said that, "This treaty is a strong statement that the United States is committed to reducing the dangers to the world that nuclear weapons present. That commitment makes it easier for us to work with the international community."

During the 2009 MDA/AIAA Annual Missile Defense Conference, Levin spoke in favor of the U.S.-Russian cooperation on missile defense: "Leaders in both the U.S. and Russia have recently expressed interest in exploring missile defense cooperation. Did you ever believe that some of our missile defense engineers and experts might be working together with their Russian counterparts? It could happen and if it does, it could help address a major threat. The bottom line is simple: We have a new opportunity to seek a cooperative approach with Russia on missile defense, and we should seize it. The upside potential of such an effort is huge – a geopolitical game changer. The downside is minimal."

As Chair of the Armed Services Committee, Levin was instrumental in the enactment of the Matthew Shephard and James Byrd, Jr., Hate Crimes Prevention Act of 2009 and the legislation ending "Don't Ask, Don't Tell" policy for gays in the military in 2010. He played a vital role in the enactment of legislation addressing the problem of sexual assault in the military in 2013 and 2014.

Levin led Senate investigations into the treatment of detainees at Guantanamo Bay Naval Base and Abu Ghraib. He also played a key role in the enactment of the Detainee Treatment Act, which prohibited the torture of detainees in U.S. custody. Levin insisted on the inclusion of language that, as affirmed by the U.S. Supreme Court, ensured that the legislation would not deprive detainees of their right to access to the federal courts under a writ of habeas corpus. Under Levin's leadership, the Senate Armed Services Committee conducted oversight hearings ranging from counterfeit parts in the DOD procurement system to the use of private security contractors in Iraq and Afghanistan.

In 2014, Levin was recognized by the Jewish Community Center Association of North America with the Frank L. Weil Jewish Military Award for legislation that has benefitted Jews and other minorities serving in the military.

==== Afghanistan war ====
After the 9/11 terrorist attacks, Levin voted in favor of Senate Joint Resolution 23, authorizing President George W. Bush the use of "necessary and appropriate force" against those who "planned, authorized, committed or aided" al-Qaeda and its affiliates.

Levin grew critical of the Bush administration's handling of the Afghanistan War, saying in 2005 that they "took their eye off the ball when we decided to go after Iraq instead of al-Qaeda, the people who had attacked us on 9/11, and their leader. In 2008, Levin became concerned that the United States and the international community lacked a strategy for success in Afghanistan, and that NATO failed to supply troops and equipment needed in emergency situations.

Levin was opposed to the 2009 Afghanistan troop surge (adding 30,000 U.S. combat troops), stressing the advancement of training and expanding the Afghan National Army (ANA); saying that the ANA should increase to 240,000 by 2012, from the original goal of 134,000, and the number of active members of the Afghan National Police should expand to 160,000, from the initial goal of 96,000. Although Levin advocated a "surge of Afghan security forces," he said that he wouldn't rule out temporarily expanding the number of combat forces, but stuck with his original position. He questioned top Obama administration officials including Secretary of State Hillary Clinton and Secretary of Defense Robert Gates during a senate hearing on the Afghanistan surge, saying that, "Where I have questions is whether the rapid deployment of a large number of U.S. combat forces, without an adequate number of Afghan security forces for our troops to partner with, serves that mission." Levin opposed setting a timetable for Afghanistan, voting against Senate Amendment 4204, requiring the President to submit a safe and orderly redeployment plan for combat troops and a plan to set a date for withdrawal, saying that, "I don't think we know enough about how these events are gonna unfold, for there to be a deadline." Levin supported the U.S. keeping a "limited footprint" in troops and in bases in Afghanistan, and said at that time he would focus the remainder of his senate tenure on the "rapid transfer of responsibility for Afghan security to the Afghans."

==== Iraq war ====
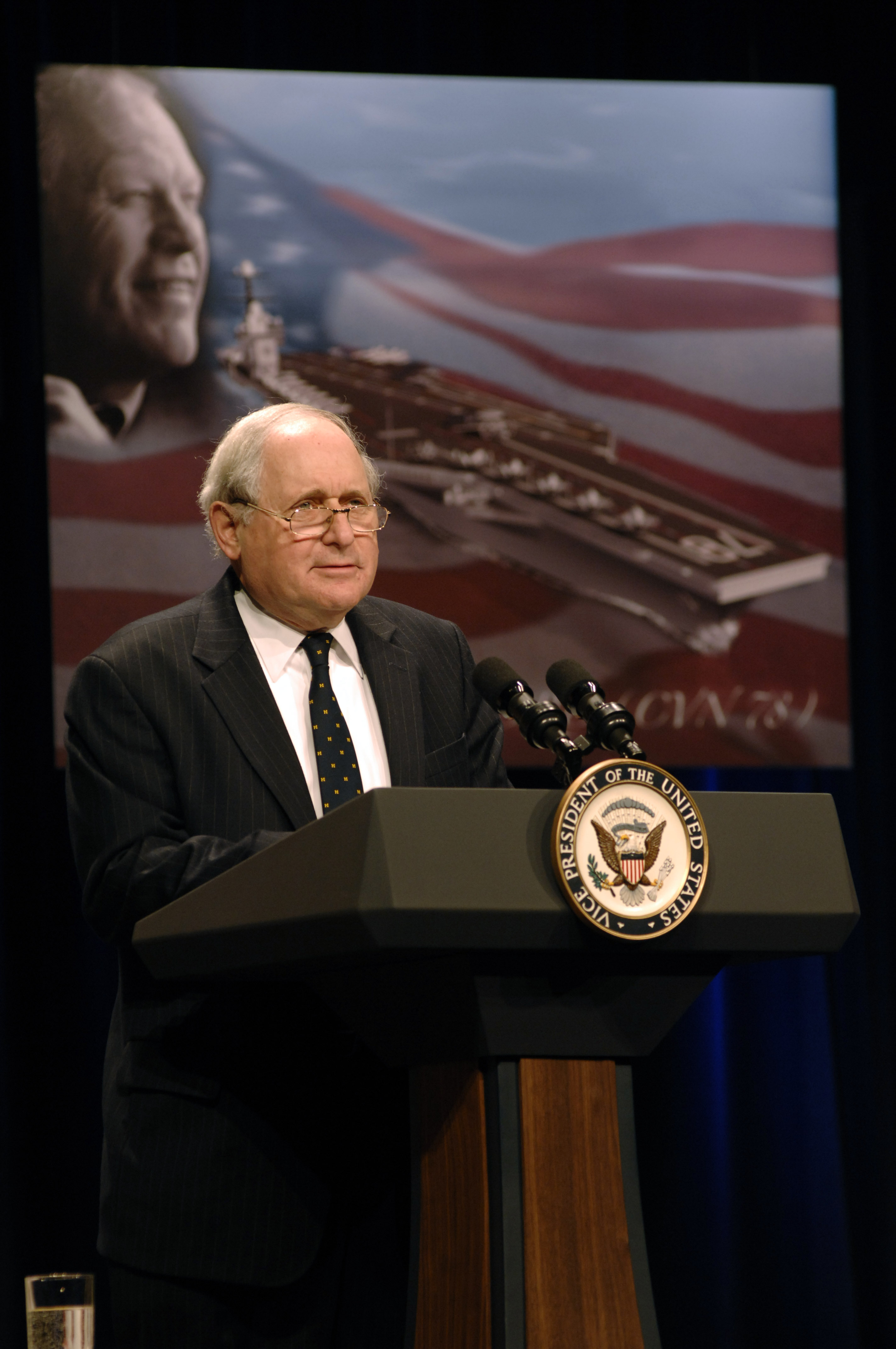
Senator Levin speaking at a 2007 event during the naming of the USS Gerald R. Ford

Levin was an early opponent of using U.S. military force in Iraq, saying in August 2002 that "if Saddam Hussein had weapons of mass destruction, he wouldn't use them," and that "he's a survivalist, not a suicide bomber". Levin proposed the failed Multilateral Use of Force Authorization Act, as an alternative to the Iraq Resolution, pushing President George W. Bush to build an international coalition in conjunction with the United Nations, so that "Saddam will be looking down the barrel of a gun, with the world at the other end rather than just the United States."

Levin was one of 23 Senators who voted against the Iraq Resolution, saying that "If we are going to take on Saddam at some point, it is critical that we have the world with us, that there be a U.N. resolve that authorizes war, because the consequences are very, very severe. If we go without a declaration from the U.N. it is far better to have one, and that means that we've got to bring the world along here." Levin has strongly argued that the War in Iraq was a diversion from the war on terror. On CNN on November 14, 2005, Levin said that "before the war, the President was saying that you cannot distinguish between Saddam Hussein and Iraq. As a matter of fact, he said that so often that he tried to connect Saddam Hussein with the attackers on us, on 9/11, so often, so frequently and so successfully, even though it was wrong, that the American people overwhelmingly thought, because of the President's misstatements that as a matter of fact, Saddam Hussein had participated in the attack on us on 9/11. That was a deception. That was clearly misinformation. It had a huge effect on the American people."

Iraqi Prime Minister Nouri al-Maliki hit back at senior U.S. politicians who have called for al-Maliki to be removed from office. He singled out Levin and Hillary Clinton, saying the Democratic senators were acting as if Iraq was "their property" and that they should "come to their senses" and "respect democracy".

After the 2006 midterm elections, with the Democratic Party taking control of the Senate and Levin being reappointed Chairman of the Senate Armed Services Committee, he was seen to have gained an influential position to oppose the Bush administration's Iraq policy, initially proposing efforts for "phased withdrawals". Though on January 10, 2007, after Bush announced intentions to send an additional 20,000 troops to Iraq, Levin said that he would support the plan if it were tied to a broader strategy of reducing the overall amount of U.S. troops; receiving opposition from his own party. In late January 2007, amid what was seen as the fiercest political battle over the Iraq strategy during the Iraq War, Levin joined a bipartisan group of senators, including then Foreign Relations Committee Chairman Joe Biden (D-DE), Susan Collins (R-ME), and Chuck Hagel (R-NE), to oppose any further escalation in Iraq; and in voting in March 2007, in favor of setting a withdrawal date for U.S. forces in Iraq. After continued criticism over the Iraq War troop surge, in August 2007, Levin and senator John Warner (R-VA), visited military bases in Mosul and Baghdad, saying that the surge brought "credible and positive results," though it failed to bring the political reconciliation needed and urged the Iraqi Parliament to hold a "no-confidence vote" on the government of Prime Minister al-Maliki. In October 2011, Levin said that President Barack Obama made the "right decision" in withdrawing U.S. troops from Iraq at the end of 2011, and not continuing a U.S. military presence.

"This is not just a foreign war. They brought that war to our shores on 9/11. They are at war with us. The Supreme Court said, and I am going to read these words again, 'There is no bar to this nation's holding one of its own citizens as an enemy combatant.' "

— U.S. Senator Carl Levin, 2011

==== National Defense Authorization Act 2012 ====
As part of the National Defense Authorization Act for Fiscal Year 2012 (the main annual bill used to fund the US military) Levin and Senator John McCain (ranking Republican on Armed Services Committee-AZ) included provisions that affirmed the authority of the United States military to detain captured individuals, including terrorists, in accordance with the law of war and required such detention for members of al Qaeda and others who planned or carried out the attacks against the United States. As initially proposed the provisions applied to American citizens. After objections were raised that such detention violates Americans' constitutional rights, Levin agreed to include language (to section 1032, later 1021, of the bill) which exempted American citizens from the requirement for military detention. The provision affirming the authority for military detention was modified to specify that it did not affect existing law or authorities relating to the detention of U.S. citizens or lawful resident aliens, but did not specifically exclude them from indefinite detention. Levin quoted the Supreme Court's 2004 decision in Hamdi v. Rumsfeld in support of his language authorizing indefinite detention.

==== National Defense Authorization Act 2015 ====
The 2015 National Defense Authorization Act was named the Carl Levin and Howard P. "Buck" McKeon National Defense Authorization Act for Fiscal Year 2015.

==== Levin-Warner Legislative Affairs Suite ====
In 2016, the Department of Defense named the office suite of the Office of the Assistant Secretary of Defense for Legislative Affairs in honor of Levin and Sen. John Warner to honor their bipartisan legislative accomplishments.

==== Acquisition ====
Levin authored the Competition in Contracting Act, which has led to reductions in federal procurement costs. He played an instrumental role in the enactment of the Federal Acquisition Streamlining Act, which cut red tape out of the federal procurement system and prioritized the purchase of commercial products over government-unique designs. He teamed with Senator John McCain to write the Weapon Systems Acquisition Reform Act, which virtually eliminated cost overruns on major defense purchases for a period of several years after its enactment.

=== Permanent Subcommittee on Investigations/Financial Oversight ===
For 15 years, from 1999 to 2014, Senator Levin served in leadership positions on the U.S. Senate Permanent Subcommittee on Investigations. During his tenure the senator led investigations into such matters as money laundering, offshore tax abuse, and corporate misconduct.

Highlights from his money laundering investigations included exposing money laundering via Citibank private bank accounts serving the wealthy and corrupt including Mexico's Raúl Salinas de Gortari and Gabon's late President Omar Bongo; correspondent accounts opened for high-risk offshore banks moving suspect funds; embassy and personal accounts opened for foreign leaders like Chile's Augusto Pinochet and Equatorial Guinea's dictator Teodoro Obiang; and accounts at a major global bank, HSBC, misused by Mexican drug traffickers, Russian fraudsters, and rogue regimes like Iran.

Levin also led tax investigations that attracted international attention for exposing tax misconduct by wealthy individuals and profitable corporations. Highlights included investigations that exposed abusive tax shelters designed and marketed by accounting firms like KPMG; a 13-year network of 58 offshore trusts and corporations established and used by wealthy Texas brothers, Sam and Charles Wyly, to evade paying their fair share; Swiss banks like UBS and Credit Suisse that helped U.S. tax cheats hide assets; and complex corporate tax schemes that enabled Apple, Microsoft, Hewlett-Packard, and Caterpillar to avoid paying millions, even billions in taxes.

His inquiries into corporate misconduct were equally famous. Levin's highlights here included exposing Enron's use of accounting deceptions, financial gimmicks, and executive pay schemes leading to its collapse into bankruptcy; unfair credit card practices that loaded up average U.S. families with debt; JPMorgan Chase's $6 billion loss from hidden, reckless derivative trades by the so-called London Whale; and risky investments by the United States' largest banks to profit from physical commodities like oil, natural gas, aluminum, and electricity at the expense of American businesses and families.

=== Education ===
Levin was a strong supporter of the creation of the Department of Education. Over the years, Levin introduced legislation and amendments to improve education, including an amendment that greatly reduced class sizes to help teachers better focus on the needs of each specific child. Levin was a hesitant sponsor of the No Child Left Behind Act.

=== Energy ===
In 2009, Senator Levin directed the Homeland Security and Governmental Affairs Permanent Subcommittee on Investigations to investigate whether Department of Energy policies caused a rise in the price in crude oil. He also led an investigation in 2001 to try to discover the cause of the spike in gasoline prices that summer.

Levin opposed raising mandatory automobile fuel efficiency standards.

Levin led opposition in the Senate to the Rahall Energy Policy Bill (H.R. 6), but lost 65–27.

=== Environment ===
On January 22, 2013, Levin introduced the Sleeping Bear Dunes National Lakeshore Conservation and Recreation Act (S. 23; 113th Congress) into the Senate. The act designated as wilderness about 32,500 acres (130 km^{2}) of the Sleeping Bear Dunes National Lakeshore in the state of Michigan. The newly designated lands and inland waterways comprise the Sleeping Bear Dunes Wilderness, a new component of the National Wilderness Preservation System.

Levin worked to prevent garbage from Canada from being disposed of in Michigan.

In 2011, the Detroit/Wayne County Port Authority (DWCPA), in conjunction with the City of Detroit and MDOT, and through the leadership of Senator Carl M. Levin, opened a 21,000-square-foot public dock and terminal on the riverfront. In 2013, the facility was named the Carl M. Levin Building in honor of the senator's efforts to transform the Detroit riverfront.

As co-chair of the Senate Great Lakes Task Force, he fought to protect Michigan's signature natural resource. His work included support for Great Lakes harbors, which are vital to Michigan's economy and the nation's; work to increase funding for Great Lakes environmental restoration; and to preserve the natural, historical, and cultural legacy of the lakes, including historic lighthouses. He played a leading role in helping found the Thunder Bay National Marine Sanctuary and Keweenaw National Historic Park (National Park Service), and in legislation to preserve Michigan wilderness areas.

=== Ethics ===
Levin authored the Lobbying Disclosure Act of 1995, which established the first effective disclosure requirements for federal lobbyists and association provisions that significantly tightened the rules governing gifts to Members of Congress from lobbyists and others. Levin was the author of the Ethics Reform Act of 1989 which prohibited gifts of honoraria to Members of Congress and significantly limited the use of expensive junkets. He also authored the Whistleblower Protection Act, which protected federal employees who expose wasteful and unnecessary practices.

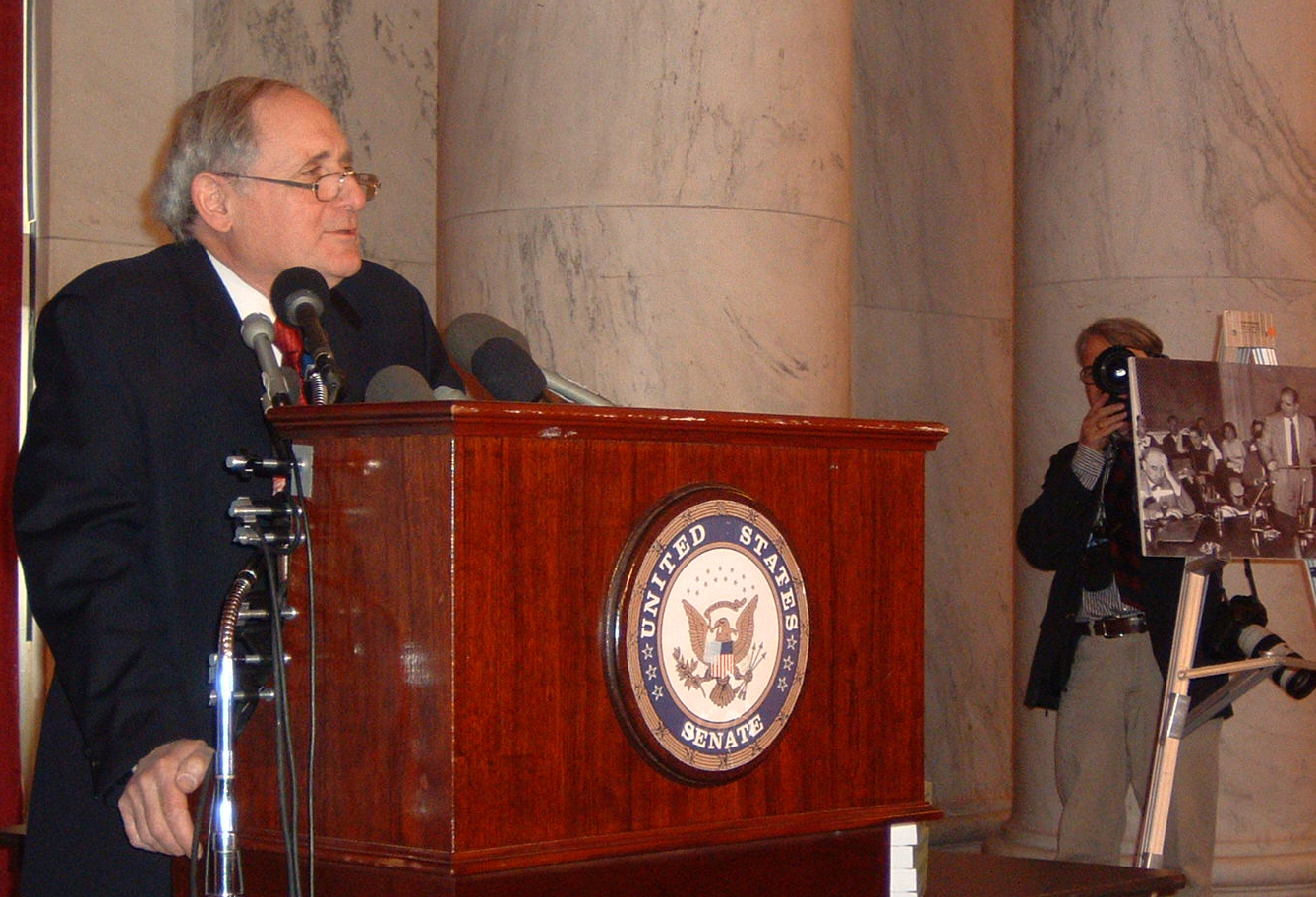
Senator Carl Levin announces at a 2003 press conference his opposition to the War in Iraq and his willingness to vote "No" on the authorization for President George W. Bush to invade Iraq.

=== Health care ===
Senator Levin supported a Patients' Bill of Rights to reduce the ability of managed care organizations to affect medical decisions.

Levin was an advocate for embryonic stem-cell research because of its potential to cure diseases like Alzheimer's, diabetes, and Parkinson's.

=== Procedure ===
Senator Levin was one of only three Democratic senators to dissent from Harry Reid's leadership to vote against the nuclear option which switched the Senate away from operating on a supermajority basis, to requiring only a simple majority for certain decisions, on November 21, 2013. Levin supported changing the rules to a simple majority for confirmation votes, but did not support using the nuclear option to do so, saying in his speech on the floor on that day that this "removes an important check on majority overreach" and that he wished to "preserve the rights of the Senate minority".

=== Stop Tax Haven Abuse Act ===
Levin initiated the Stop Tax Haven Abuse Act against alleged tax havens, for the state of the initiative against tax avoidance and tax evasion registered as S.506, and the complementary initiative H.R.1265.

=== Miscellaneous ===
Levin was a critic of the New Hampshire presidential primary's first-in-the-nation status, saying a more diverse state, such as his own Michigan, should hold its contest first.

In June 1986, along with Paul Simon and John Melcher, Levin was one of three senators to oppose a tax reform bill.

In November 1998, Levin attended a White House reception for National Adoption Month.

In April 2006, Levin was selected by Time as one of "America's 10 Best Senators".

The American Civil Liberties Union gave Levin an 84% lifetime rating on civil liberties issues.

A strong gun control advocate, Levin was graded F by Gun Owners of America. He was one of the 16 senators who voted against the Vitter Amendment.

He was almost always seen wearing his glasses at the end of his nose, which drew a bounty of humorous attention. In response, he lightheartedly joked that the late Senator Strom Thurmond (while he was in office) would have never worn his glasses because they "make him look old." Daily Show host Jon Stewart referred to him both as the "kindly old shoemaker", and "Grandpa Munster".

An avid supporter of the non-profit civil rights organization Focus: HOPE, Levin was instrumental in the procurement of equipment and funding for their Machinist Training Institute (MTI).

== Political campaigns ==
Levin was first elected to the U.S. Senate in 1978. In the Democratic primary, he defeated former U.S. Representative Richard Vander Veen. In the general election, he faced former Senate Minority Whip Robert P. Griffin, whom he defeated 52% to 48%. He won re-election five times before retiring from the Senate.

Levin faced a tough reelection bid in 1984 against former astronaut Jack R. Lousma, winning by only four percent. However, he routed Congressman Bill Schuette in 1990, and was reelected in 1996 and 2002 against only nominal Republican opposition. In 2002, Levin garnered 61% of the vote against Republican Andrew "Rocky" Raczkowski despite the then-high popularity of President George W. Bush and the GOP and a close gubernatorial race that year. In the 2008 election, Levin won by a comfortable margin against state representative Jack Hoogendyk.

=== Electoral history ===
Carl Levin's electoral history

United States Senate election in Michigan, 2008
Party	Candidate	Votes	%	±%
Democratic	Carl Levin (inc.)	3,038,386	62.7	+2.1
Republican	Jack Hoogendyk	1,641,070	33.8	−4.1
Libertarian	Scotty Boman	76,347	1.6	n/a
Green	Harley Mikkelson	43,440	0.9	+0.1
U.S. Taxpayers	Michael Nikitin	30,827	0.6	n/a
Natural Law	Doug Dern	18,550	0.4	+0.1
Majority		1,397,316		
Turnout		4,848,620		

United States Senate election in Michigan, 2002
Party	Candidate	Votes	%	±%
Democratic	Carl Levin (inc.)	1,896,614	60.61	+2.25
Republican	Rocky Raczkowski	1,185,545	37.89	−1.98
Green	Eric Borregard	23,931	0.76	+0.76

United States Senate election in Michigan, 1996
Party	Candidate	Votes	%	±%
Democratic	Carl Levin (inc.)	2,195,738	58.4	
Republican	Ronna Romney	1,500,106	39.9	
Libertarian	Kenneth L. Proctor	36,911	1.0	
Workers World	William Roundtree	12,235	0.3	
Natural Law	Joseph S. Mattingly	11,306	0.3	
Socialist	Martin P. McLaughlin	5,975	0.2	

United States Senate election in Michigan, 1990
Party	Candidate	Votes	%	±%
Democratic	Carl Levin (inc.)	1,471,753	57.4	
Republican	Bill Schuette	1,055,695	41.2	
Workers World	Susan Farquhar	32,796	1.3	

United States Senate election in Michigan, 1984
Party	Candidate	Votes	%	±%
Democratic	Carl Levin (inc.)	1,915,831	51.8	
Republican	Jack Lousma	1,745,302	47.2	
Tisch Citizens	Arthur Richard Tisch	22,882	0.6	
Libertarian	Lynn Johnston	7,786	0.2	
Socialist	Helen Meyers	2,686	0.1	
Workers World	William Roundtree	2,279	0.1	
Independent	Max Dean	2,135	0.1	
Communist	Samuel L. Webb	1,196	0.0	
Workers League	Fred Mazelis	818	0.0	

United States Senate election in Michigan, 1978
Party	Candidate	Votes	%	±%
Democratic	Carl Levin	1,484,193	52.1	
Republican	Rob Griffin (inc.)	1,362,165	47.8	

== Personal life and death ==
Carl Levin married Barbara Halpern in 1961, and they had three daughters and six grandchildren.

Levin's family has long been active in Michigan politics. His elder brother, Sander Levin, represented Michigan's 12th congressional district in the House of Representatives from 1983 to 2019. Sander's son Andy Levin was a policy analyst for the AFL–CIO, and was elected in 2018 to the United States House of Representatives, succeeding his retiring father. Carl's uncle Theodore Levin was a chief judge on the U.S. District Court for the Eastern District of Michigan. Carl's first cousin Charles Levin was a Michigan Supreme Court judge; another first cousin, Joseph Levin, was a candidate for the House.

In March 2021, Levin disclosed that he had lung cancer. Levin died at Henry Ford Hospital in Detroit, on July 29, 2021, at age 87.

== Honors and awards ==
- In 2004, he received the Honorary degree of Doctor of Laws from Oakland University.
- In 2004, he was presented the National Guard Association of the U.S. Harry S. Truman Award.
- In 2006, Time named him one of the "10 best senators".
- In 2007, he was awarded the Franklin and Eleanor Roosevelt Foundation's Freedom medal.
- In 2011, he received Global Financial Integrity's Award for Exemplary Leadership for his "untiring efforts on behalf of financial integrity in the U.S. and abroad."
- In 2013, he was given the Secretary of the Navy Distinguished Public Service Medal.
- In 2014, he was awarded the National Marine Sanctuary Foundation Leadership Award.
- In 2014, he was awarded the First Global Citizen Award from Lawrence Tech.
- In 2016, USS Carl M. Levin, an Arleigh Burke-class destroyer was named in his honor, and was christened in 2021. It was commissioned in Baltimore on June 24, 2023.

== See also ==
- List of Harvard University politicians
- List of Jewish members of the United States Congress

Party political offices
Preceded by Frank Kelley	Democratic nominee for U.S. Senator from Michigan (Class 2); 1978, 1984, 1990, 1996, 2002, 2008	Succeeded by Gary Peters
Preceded by Les AuCoin, Joe Biden, Bill Bradley, Robert Byrd, Tom Daschle, Bill Hefner, Barbara B. Kennelly, George Miller, Tip O'Neill, Paul Tsongas, Tim Wirth	Response to the State of the Union address 1984; Served alongside: Max Baucus, Joe Biden, David Boren, Barbara Boxer, Robert Byrd, Dante Fascell, Bill Gray, Tom Harkin, Dee Huddleston, Tip O'Neill, Claiborne Pell	Succeeded by Bill Clinton; Bob Graham; Tip O'Neill
U.S. Senate
Preceded by Robert Griffin	U.S. Senator (Class 2) from Michigan; 1979–2015; Served alongside: Don Riegle, Spencer Abraham, Debbie Stabenow	Succeeded by Gary Peters
Preceded by Sam Nunn	Ranking Member of the Senate Armed Services Committee; 1997–2001	Succeeded by John Warner
Preceded by John Warner	Chair of the Senate Armed Services Committee; 2001, 2001–2003	Succeeded by John Warner
Preceded by John Warner	Ranking Member of the Senate Armed Services Committee; 2001	Succeeded by John Warner
Preceded by John Warner	Ranking Member of the Senate Armed Services Committee; 2003–2007	Succeeded by John McCain
Preceded by John Warner	Chair of the Senate Armed Services Committee; 2007–2015	Succeeded by John McCain
