= STS-3 =

1982 American crewed spaceflight

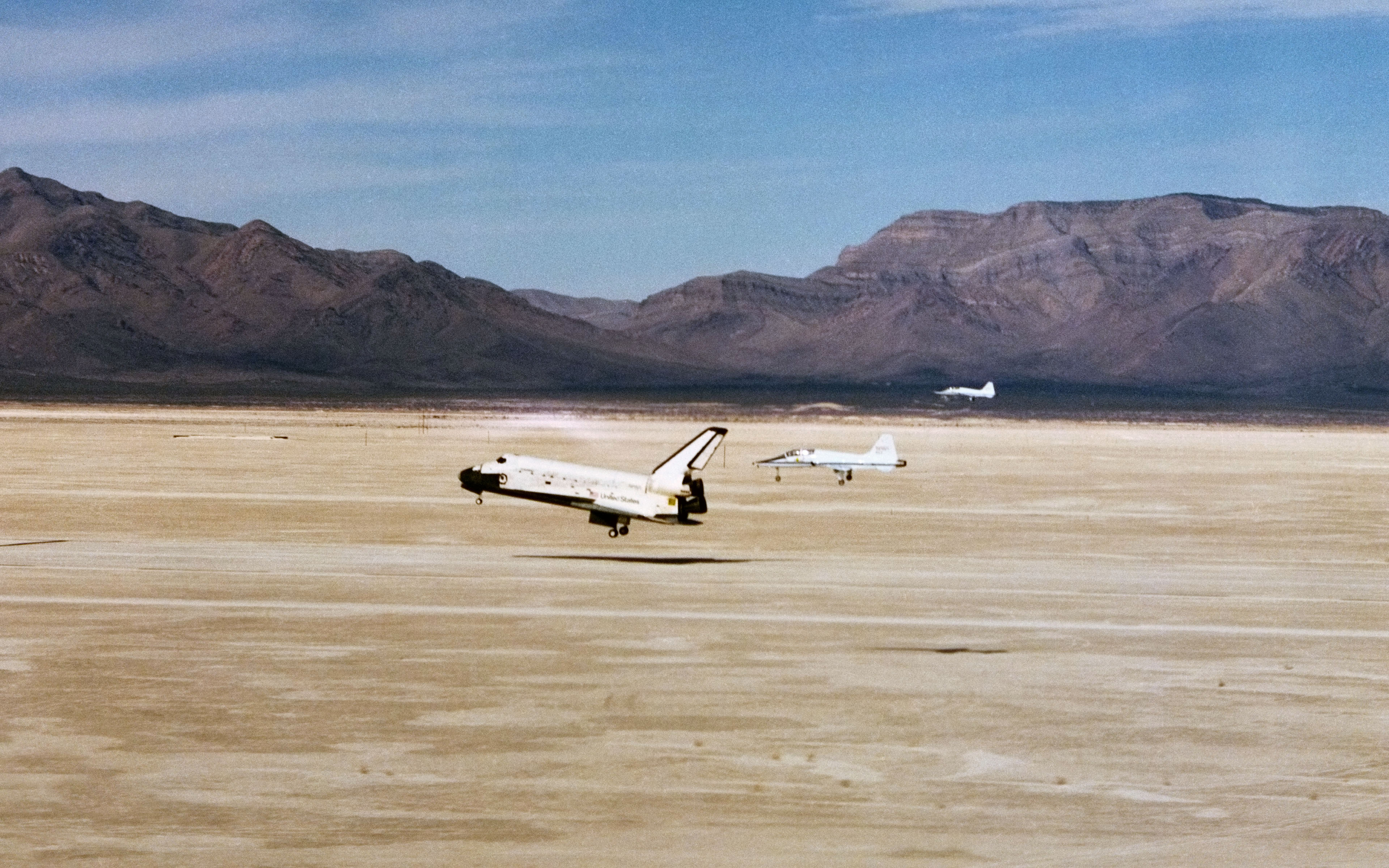
- STS-3 landing at Northrop Strip, White Sands, New Mexico, on March 30, 1982, with two T-38 Talon chase planes observing.
- Names: Space Transportation System-3
- Mission type: Flight test
- Operator: NASA
- COSPAR ID: 1982-022A
- SATCAT no.: 13106
- Mission duration: 8 days, 4 minutes, 46 seconds
- Distance travelled: 5,300,000 km (3,300,000 mi)
- Orbits completed: 130

Spacecraft properties
- Spacecraft: Space Shuttle Columbia
- Launch mass: 106,782 kg (235,414 lb)
- Landing mass: 93,924 kg (207,067 lb)
- Payload mass: 10,301 kg (22,710 lb)

Crew
- Crew size: 2
- Members: Jack R. Lousma; C. Gordon Fullerton

Start of mission
- Launch date: March 22, 1982, 16:00:00 UTC (11:00 am EST)
- Launch site: Kennedy, LC-39A
- Contractor: Rockwell International

End of mission
- Landing date: March 30, 1982, 16:04:45 UTC (9:04:45 am MST)
- Landing site: White Sands, Northrop Strip Runway 17

Orbital parameters
- Reference system: Geocentric orbit
- Regime: Low Earth orbit
- Perigee altitude: 241 km (150 mi)
- Apogee altitude: 249 km (155 mi)
- Inclination: 38.00°
- Period: 89.40 minutes

Instruments
- Development Flight Instrumentation (DFI); Office of Space Science (OSS-1) pallet; Plasma Diagnostics Package (PDP)
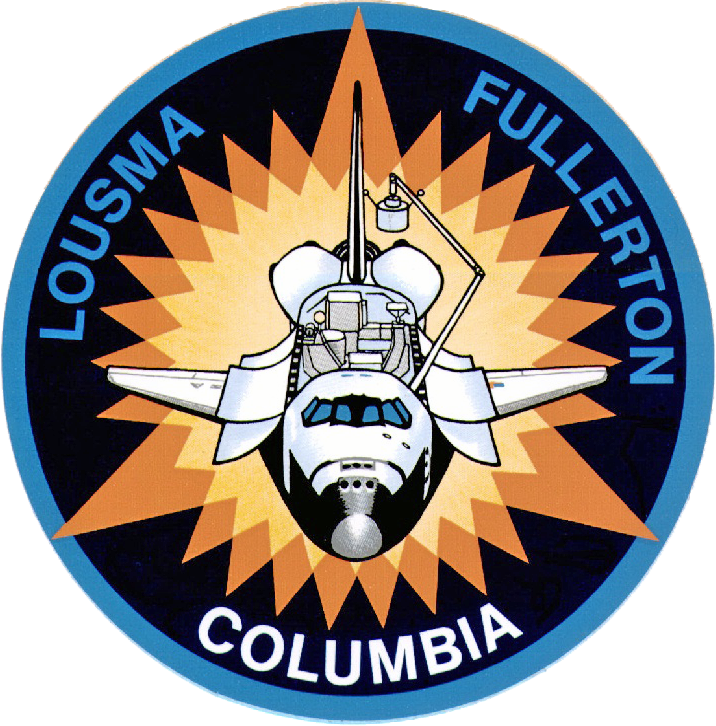
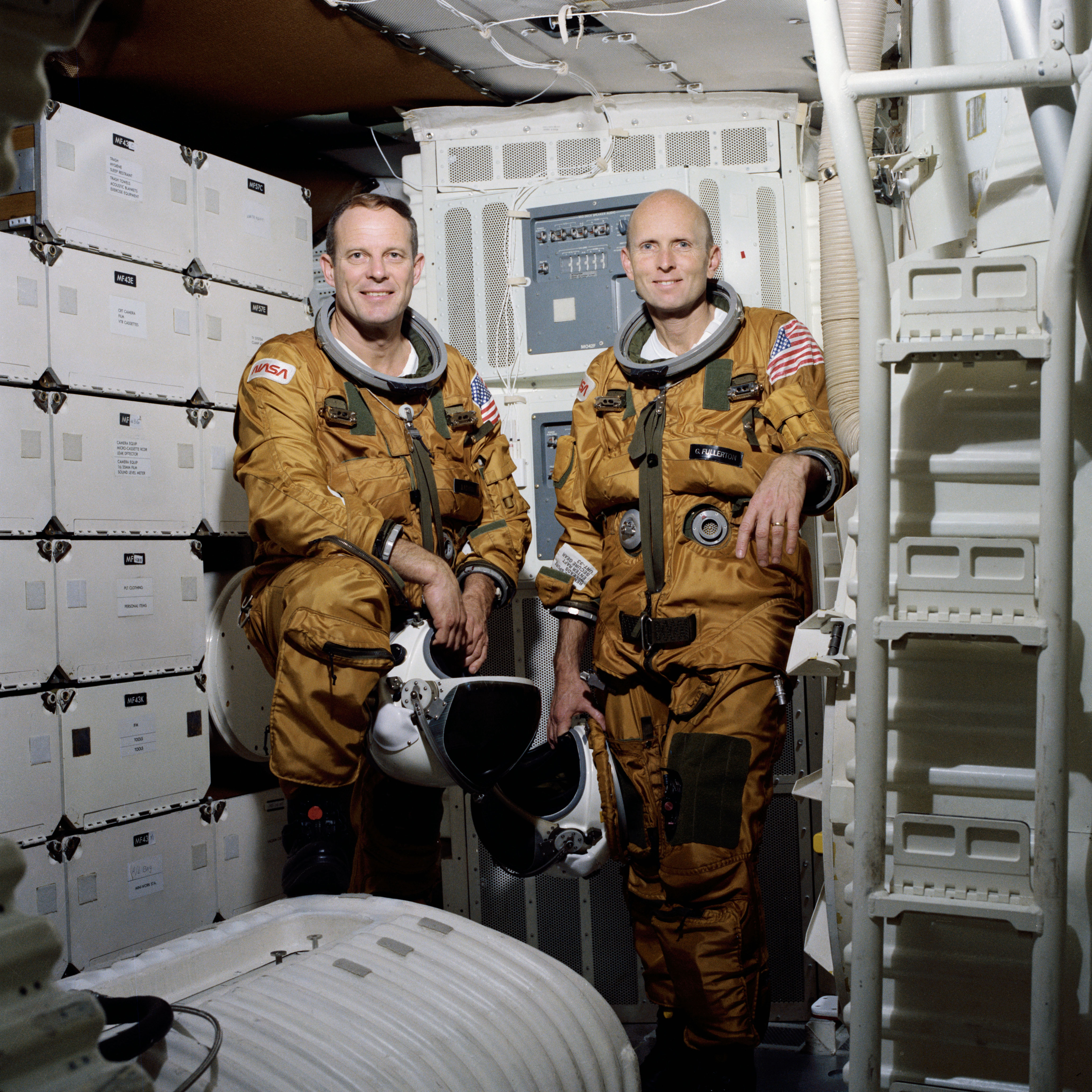
- STS-3 mission patch Lousma and Fullerton Space Shuttle program

STS-3 was NASA's third Space Shuttle mission and the third mission for the Space Shuttle Columbia. It launched on March 22, 1982 and landed eight days later on March 30, 1982. The mission, crewed by Jack R. Lousma and C. Gordon Fullerton, involved extensive orbital endurance testing of Columbia itself, as well as numerous scientific experiments. STS-3 was the first shuttle launch with an unpainted external tank and the only mission to land at the White Sands Space Harbor near Alamogordo, New Mexico. The orbiter was forced to land at White Sands due to flooding at its originally planned landing site, Edwards Air Force Base.

== Crew ==
Position	Astronaut
Commander	Jack R. Lousma; Second and last spaceflight
Pilot	C. Gordon Fullerton; First spaceflight

Commander Jack R. Lousma previously flew as pilot of the second Skylab crew (Skylab 3), staying aboard the space station for 59 days from July to September 1973. Lousma had previously been selected in 1978 as Pilot for STS-2, which was then scheduled as a Skylab reboost mission. When delays in the Shuttle's development prevented Columbia from being launched in time to rendezvous with Skylab in 1979, STS-2 Commander Fred W. Haise Jr. retired from NASA, and Lousma was then moved up as Commander of STS-3. Lousma also served on the support crews for Apollo 9, 10 and 13; he was the CAPCOM during the time of the latter mission's near-disastrous accident. He was also selected as backup Docking Module Pilot for the Apollo–Soyuz Test Project (ASTP) in 1975.

Fullerton was a rookie who transferred to NASA in 1969 after the cancellation of the U.S. Air Force's Manned Orbiting Laboratory (MOL) program. Fullerton had previous experience with the Shuttle, as he had flown the shuttle Enterprise as Pilot alongside Haise during the Approach and Landing Tests (ALT) program in 1977. He also served as part of the support crew for Apollo 14, 15, 16 and 17.

=== Backup crew ===
Position	Astronaut
Commander	Ken Mattingly
Pilot	Henry Hartsfield

=== Support crew ===
- Terry J. Hart (ascent CAPCOM)
- Steven R. Nagel (entry CAPCOM)
- George D. Nelson
- Sally K. Ride
- Brewster H. Shaw
- David M. Walker

=== Crew seat assignments ===
Seat	Launch	Landing	Seats 1–4 are on the flight deck. Seats 5–7 are on the mid-deck.
1	Lousma		Seats 1–4 are on the flight deck. Seats 5–7 are on the mid-deck.
2	Fullerton		Seats 1–4 are on the flight deck. Seats 5–7 are on the mid-deck.
3	Unused		Seats 1–4 are on the flight deck. Seats 5–7 are on the mid-deck.
4	Unused		Seats 1–4 are on the flight deck. Seats 5–7 are on the mid-deck.
5	Unused		Seats 1–4 are on the flight deck. Seats 5–7 are on the mid-deck.
6	Unused		Seats 1–4 are on the flight deck. Seats 5–7 are on the mid-deck.
7	Unused		Seats 1–4 are on the flight deck. Seats 5–7 are on the mid-deck.

== Mission summary ==
Columbia was launched from Kennedy Space Center at 16:00 UTC, on March 22, 1982, the planned launch date. This was the first launch with an unpainted external tank (ET). The launch was delayed by one hour due to the failure of a heater on a nitrogen-gas ground support line. Prior to the launch, Columbia had spent only 70 days in the Orbiter Processing Facility – a record checkout time.

Attempt	Planned	Result	Turnaround	Reason	Decision point	Weather go (%)	Notes
1	22 Mar 1982, 11:00:00 am	Success	—	Technical			Delayed by one hour when the Main Engine GN2 purge header temperature sensor failed in GSE.

STS-3 lifting off from Launch Complex-39A at Kennedy Space Center.

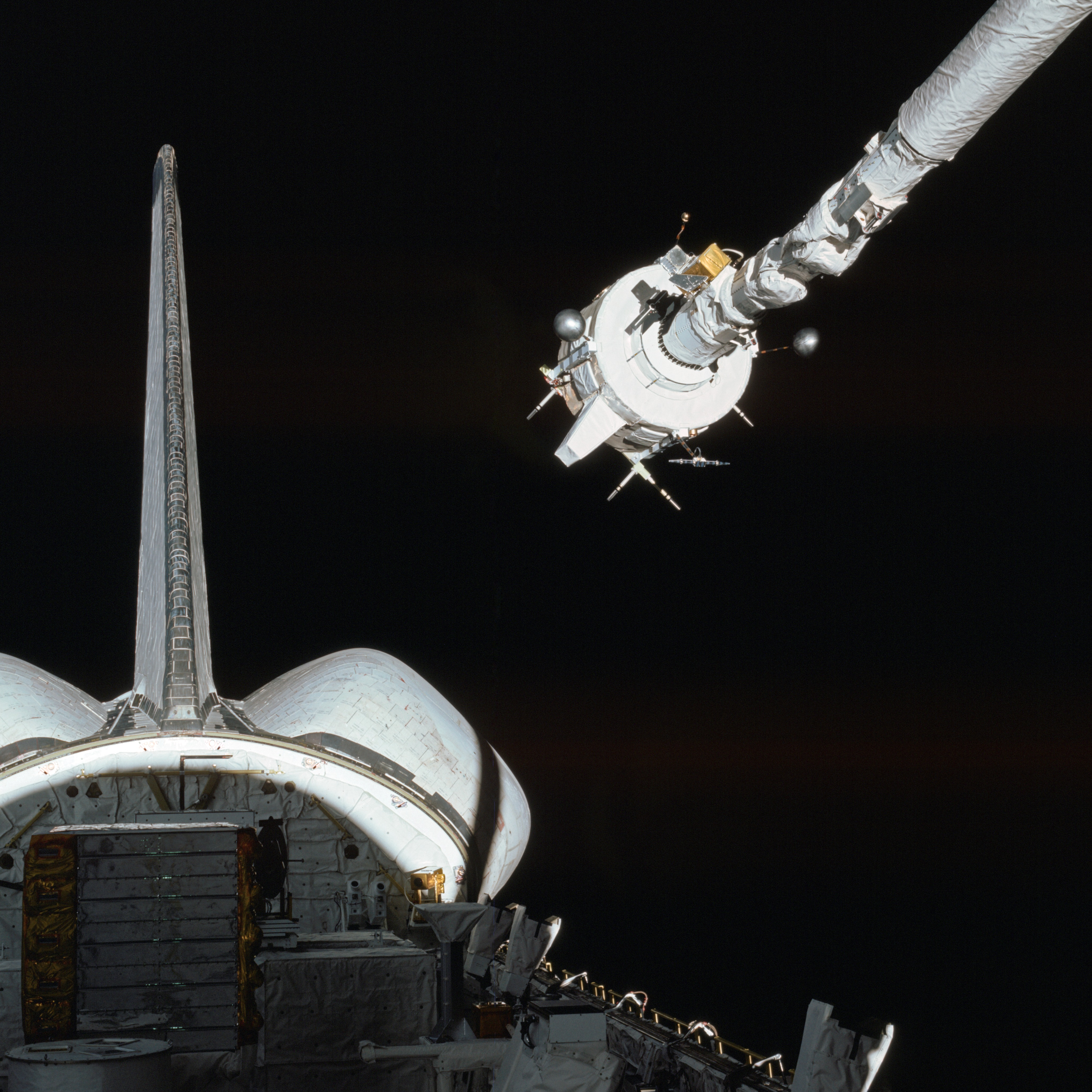
The Plasma Diagnostics Package (PDP) is grappled by the shuttle's Remote Manipulator System (Canadarm).

The primary objectives of the flight were to continue testing the Remote Manipulator System (Canadarm) and to carry out extensive thermal testing of Columbia by exposing its tail, nose and top to sunlight for varying periods of time. The crew found that prolonged exposure caused the cargo bay doors to warp slightly, preventing them from closing fully. Rolling the orbiter to balance temperatures around the orbiter resolved the issue.

In addition, in its payload bay, Columbia again carried the Development Flight Instrumentation (DFI) package and OSS-1 (named for the NASA Office of Space Science and Applications), which consisted of a number of instruments mounted on a Spacelab pallet, intended to obtain data on the near-Earth environment and the extent of contamination caused by the orbiter itself. Among other experiments, the OSS pallet contained an X-ray detector for measuring the polarization of X-rays emitted by solar flares. A test canister for the Small Self-Contained Payload program – also known as the Getaway Special (GAS) – was mounted on one side of the payload bay.

For the first time, a number of experiments were carried in the shuttle's mid-deck lockers. These included an Electrophoresis Equipment Verification Test experiment to study the separation of biological components, and a Mono-disperse Latex Reactor experiment, to produce uniform micrometer-sized latex particles. The first Shuttle Student Involvement Project (SSIP) – a study of insect motion – also was carried in a mid-deck locker.

A variety of minor problems were experienced during the flight. The orbiter's toilet malfunctioned on first use, resulting in, according to Lousma, "eight days of colorful flushing"; one Auxiliary Power Unit (APU) overheated (but worked properly during descent); both crew members experienced some space sickness; and on March 26, 1982, three communications links were lost.

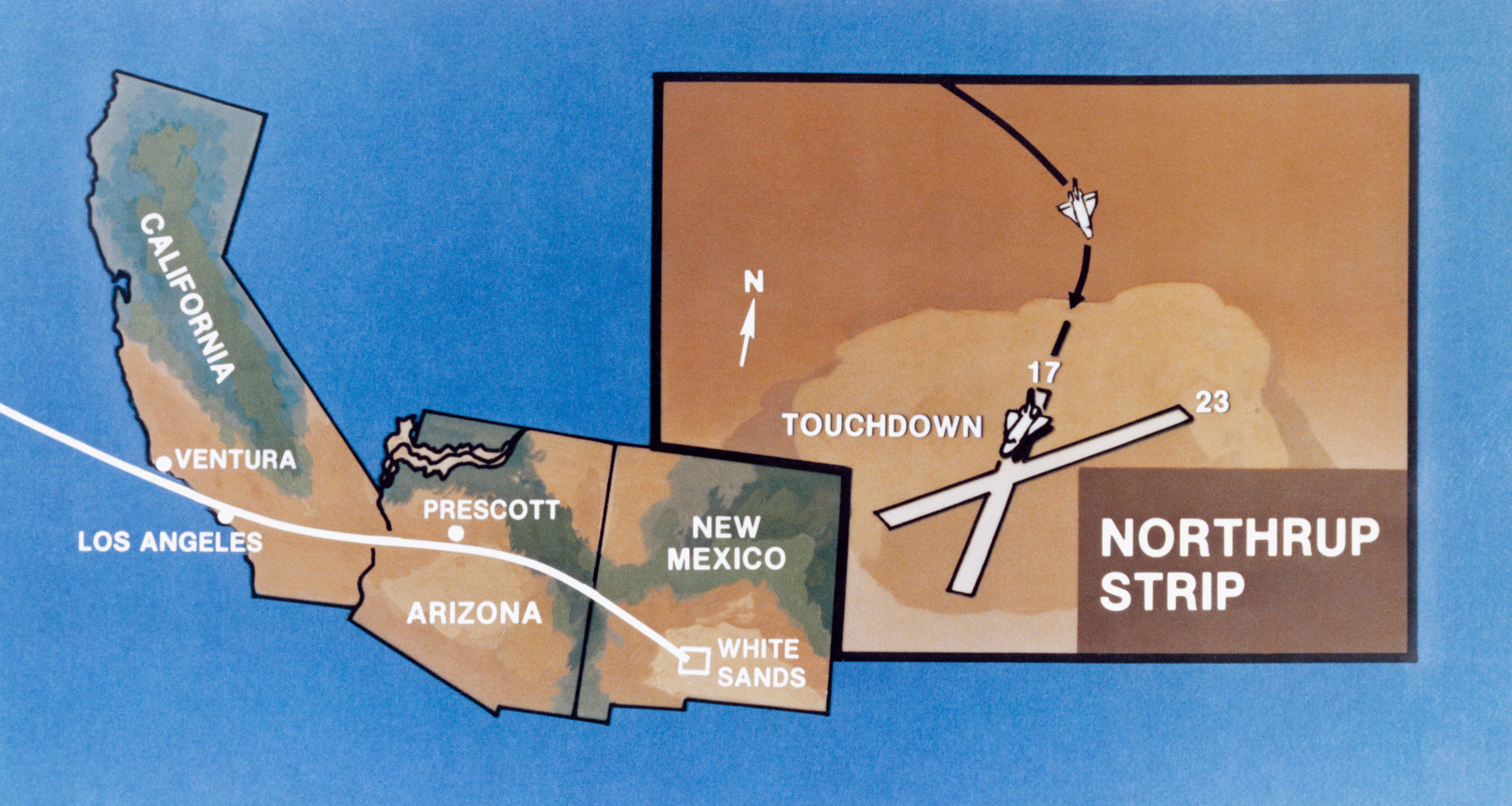
Map of the landing path of STS-3

STS-3 was planned as a 7-day flight. The landing was moved to Northrop Strip (later renamed White Sands Space Harbor) at White Sands Missile Range, New Mexico, since the planned landing site at Edwards Air Force Base had flooded. Lousma and Fullerton chose to land at White Sands instead of the new Shuttle Landing Facility (SLF) at Kennedy Space Center (KSC) because they had trained there. A large-scale equipment movement (reportedly "40 train carloads") from Edwards Air Force Base to White Sands was undertaken before and during the mission, to ensure that a landing could be fully supported. Although time-sensitive equipment movements of this nature were originally to be handled by Air Force cargo planes, NASA altered those plans and moved the equipment in two dedicated trains over the 1,600 km (990 mi) distance via the Santa Fe Railroad and the Southern Pacific Railroad. The choice to move the support equipment by rail saved NASA approximately US$2 million in transportation costs. High winds at White Sands reduced visibility and delayed the landing by a day. As all mission objectives had been accomplished, the crew enjoyed what Lousma described as "an extra day in our world's favorite vacation spot ... We finally had a chance to look out the window and enjoy being there".

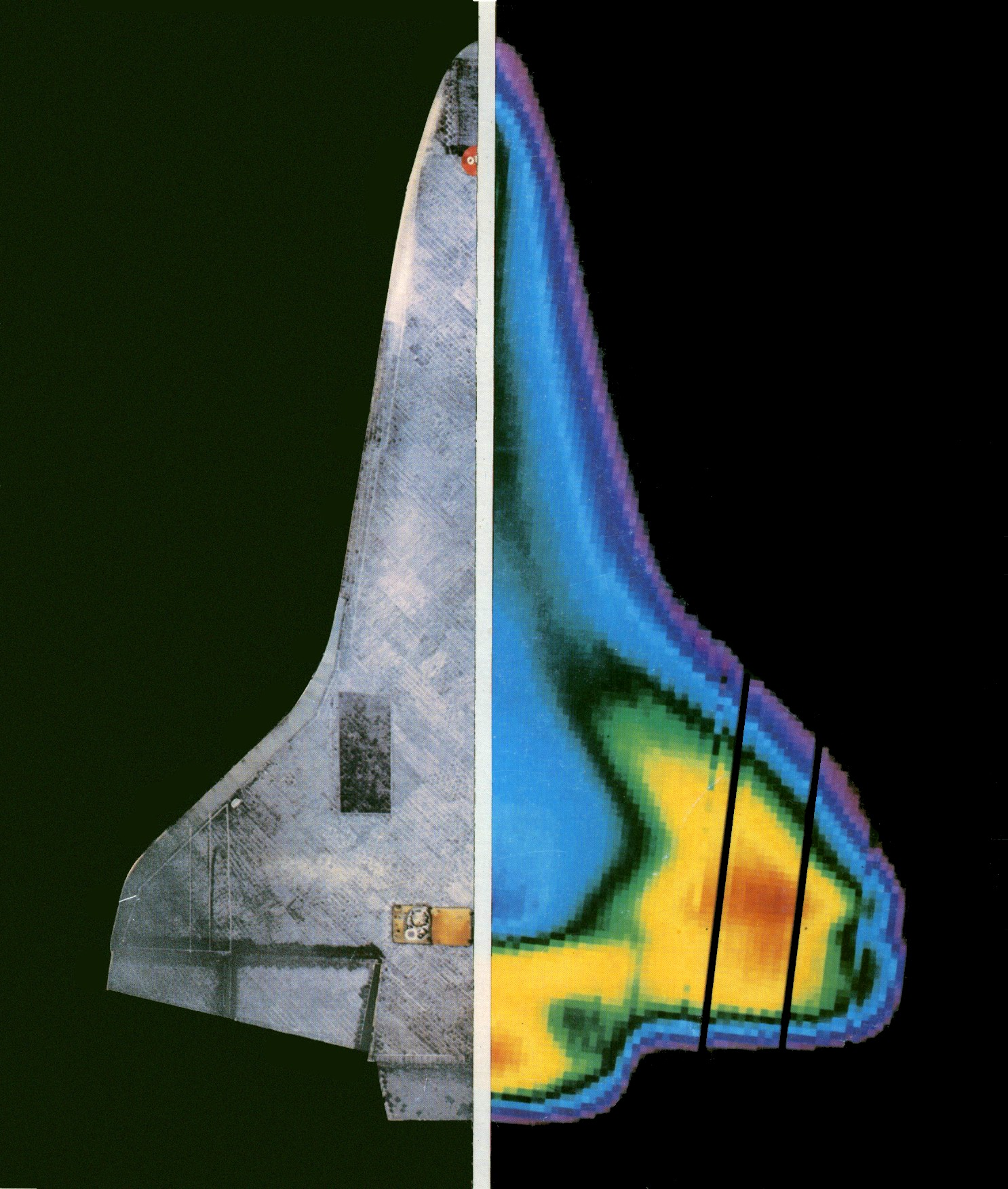
The Kuiper Airborne Observatory took an infrared image of the orbiter's heat shield to study its operational temperatures. In this image, Columbia is travelling at Mach 15.6 at an altitude of 56 km (35 mi).

As on the previous day's wave off, strong westerly high-level winds were in excess of system verification values. As a result, Columbia had to fly a less desirable high "right base" turn onto final approach instead of the more usual and forgiving overhead pattern. At this stage in the test program the Orbiter had significantly less electronic energy management information available to the crew than on later missions. With the runway visible only on his side, Fullerton called the turn in for his commander. Their escorting T-38s were led by astronaut Dick Covey and NASA photographer Pete Stanley. The final approach was in part flown by the shuttle's autopilot, but the autoland software was not complete, so it could not include an automatic landing. Rolling out on final approach, the autopilot was reengaged and responded by closing the speedbrakes (despite the orbiter being on profile), resulting in increased speed. The autopilot then commanded full speedbrakes and kept oscillating like this for some time. Lousma left the autopilot activated in order to gather data on its behavior, but disconnected it again at a very late stage to touch down manually. The landing was also one of the more dramatic of the program, with the landing gear deploying at an altitude of 46 m (151 ft) at a speed of 509 km/h (316 mph) and locking just five seconds before touchdown. Manual closure of the speed brake at a higher than normal altitude had resulted in high speed on the inner glideslope, and Lousma opted to touchdown fast rather than excessively long. The nose then began to lower at greater than planned airspeed and raised again right before nose-gear touchdown. Touchdown occurred at 16:04:46 UTC on March 30, 1982, on runway 17 at Northrop Strip.

Former Administrator of NASA Charles F. Bolden Jr. stated that Lousma was trained to disengage autoland by moving the control stick. He rolled the stick, but did not pitch it sufficiently, so autoland was still partially engaged until Fullerton warned him, causing Lousma to pitch up; Bolden, who had worked on the autoland system early in his astronaut career prior to his first space flight, stated in 2004 that the crew "saved the vehicle" by doing so.

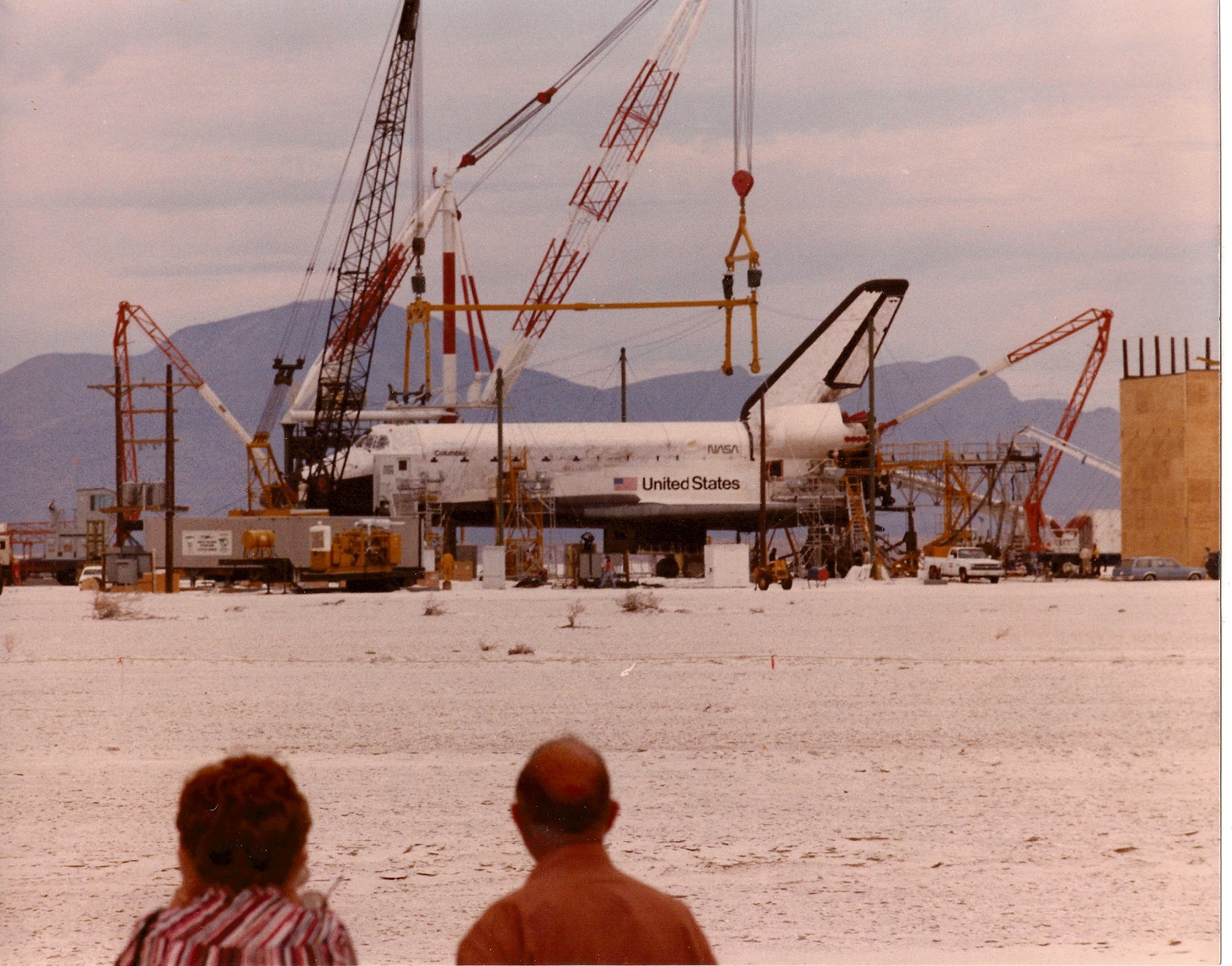
The Columbia Spacecraft Landed at White Sands covered in gypsum dust.

STS-3 was the only shuttle mission to land at White Sands Missile Range. The unexpectedly difficult landing and post-flight conditions damaged the shuttle, requiring extensive repair at KSC. So much gypsum dust covered Columbia that Bolden recalled: "I flew it several flights later on my first flight, STS-61-C, and when we got on orbit, there was still gypsum coming out of everything! They thought they had cleaned it ... but it was just unreal what it had done!" Dust continued to be found in the spacecraft for the rest of its career.

Columbia made 130 orbits and traveled 5,300,000 km (3,300,000 mi) during its 8-day 0-hour 4-minute 46-second flight. A total of 36 thermal-protection tiles were lost, and 19 were damaged. The orbiter was returned to Kennedy Space Center on April 6, 1982. STS-3 was the last mission for which NASA named a complete backup crew.

While on a post-mission goodwill tour in Beijing, Lousma displayed a photo he had taken from space of a "beautiful emerald-colored lake" in China and was surprised by the audience reaction. He later learned that the picture was likely of a secret atomic test site for the Chinese nuclear weapons program.

== Mission insignia ==
On the mission patch, Columbia is shown emerging from a star, representing the bright aspiration of space exploration. The orbiter is seen grabbing a PDP with the Canadarm and is shown with many experiments in its payload bay. The three large orange triangular points of the mission patch indicate the flight's numerical designation in the Space Transportation System's mission sequence.

== Wake-up calls ==
NASA began a tradition of playing music to astronauts during the Project Gemini and first used music to wake up a flight crew during Apollo 15. Each track is specially chosen, often by the astronauts' families, and usually has a special meaning to an individual member of the crew or is applicable to their daily activities.

Flight day	Song	Artist/composer
Day 2	"On the Road Again"	Willie Nelson
Day 3	"Marine Corps Hymn"	
Day 4	"The Air Force Song"	
Day 5	"Sailing"	Christopher Cross
Day 6	"Six Days on the Road"	Dave Dudley
Day 7	"This is My Country"	

== See also ==
- List of human spaceflights
- List of Space Shuttle missions
