= John Rakolta =

American political activist & diplomat (born 1947)

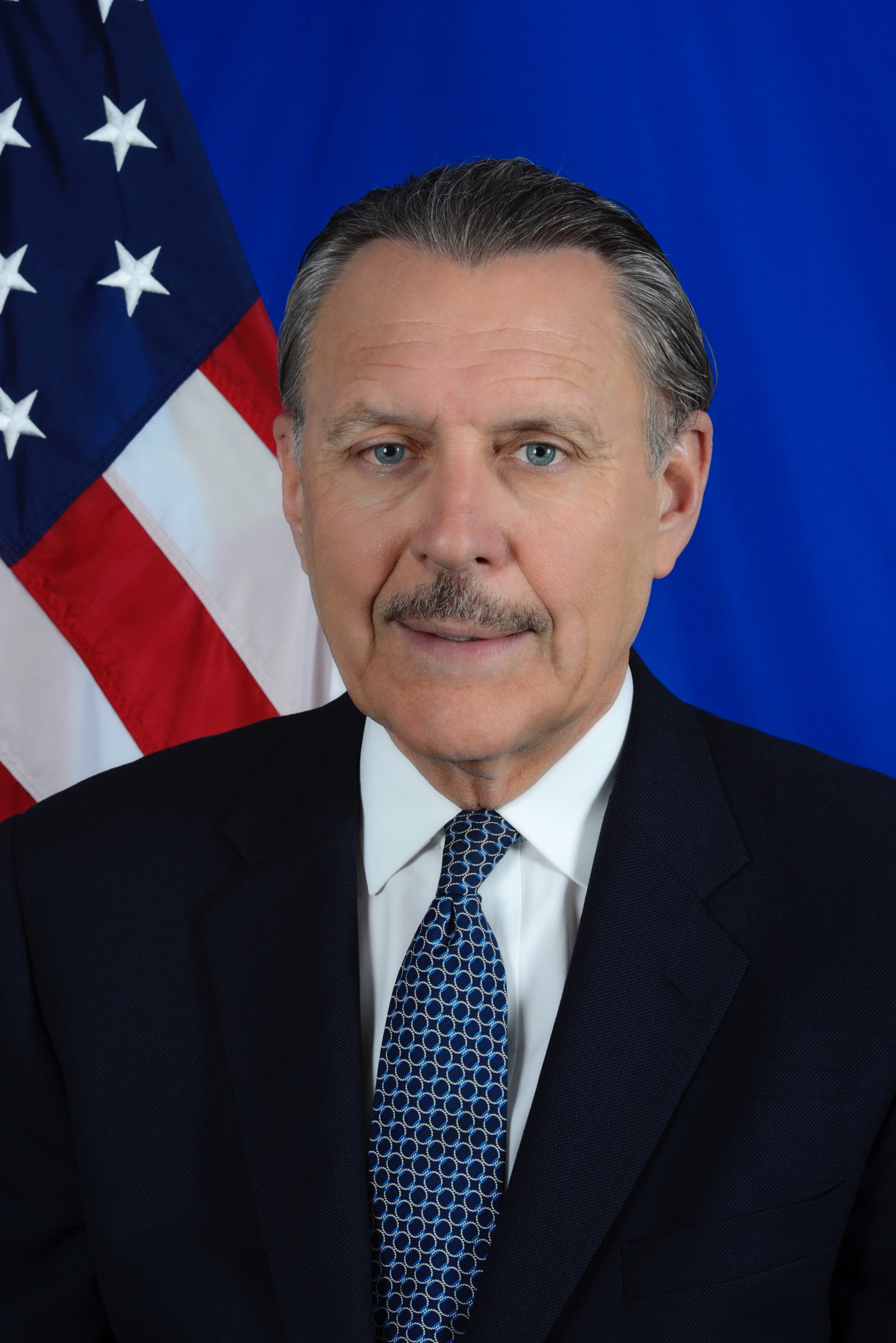
- Rakolta in 2019

United States Ambassador to the United Arab Emirates
- In office October 27, 2019 – January 19, 2021
- President: Donald Trump
- Preceded by: Barbara A. Leaf
- Succeeded by: Martina A. Strong

Personal details
- Born: June 15, 1947 (age 79) Oakland County, Michigan, U.S.
- Party: Republican
- Spouse: Terry Stern (1976–present)
- Children: 4
- Relatives: See Romney family
- Education: Marquette University (BS)

John Rakolta Jr (Romanian: Racolța; born June 15, 1947, in Oakland County, Michigan) is an American businessman and a former diplomat who served as the United States Ambassador to the United Arab Emirates from 2019 to 2021. He is the former CEO of Walbridge (formerly known as Walbridge Aldinger), a full-service construction company headquartered in Detroit. He was also one of the National Finance Chairs for Mitt Romney's 2008 and 2012 presidential campaigns.

== Education and early life ==
Rakolta received his bachelor's degree in civil engineering from Marquette University in 1970 and then studied smaller company management at the Harvard Business School.

All four of Rakolta's grandparents were immigrants from Romania. He was - until he assumed office of US Ambassador to the UAE - the Honorary-Consul General for Romania in Detroit.

== Business career ==
Rakolta's father, John Rakolta Sr. (1923–2003), was the head of Walbridge Aldinger before Rakolta. Rakolta Jr. began his career at Walbridge in 1970, and became president in 1979 and CEO and chairman in 1993.

Rakolta is also on the board of the Munder Funds since 1993.

In 2015, Walbridge and partnered with Brazilian company Construcap in the construction of a new 6-million-square-foot Jeep assembly complex and supplier park in Goiana, Brazil, and were honored by Engineering News-Record with the publication's Global Best Manufacturing Project of the Year Award. In 2015 Rakolta was co-chair of the Coalition for the Future of Detroit School Children, which recommended reform for the school system of Detroit, including limiting the number of charter schools in the city. Also in 2015, Walbridge began a multi-year transformation of the General Motors Global Technical Center in Warren, Michigan. In 2017, Ford Motor Company selected Walbridge to provide construction services for the redevelopment of its Dearborn, Michigan, world headquarters and campus facilities.

== Political career ==
Rakolta was one of the National Finance Chairs for Mitt Romney's 2008 and 2012 presidential campaigns. Along with his work for the Romney campaigns, Rakolta was a major fundraiser for the Bush campaign in 2004. Most recently he was State Finance Chair for Gov. Rick Snyder of Michigan. Rakolta served as the chairman of New Detroit from 2003 to 2010.

He was a financial advisor for Trump in Michigan and helped fund Trump's transition team after the election.

In May 2018, Rakolta was nominated by President Donald Trump to be the next United States Ambassador to the United Arab Emirates. The U.S. Senate confirmed him on September 17, 2019, by a vote of 63–30. In March 2020, Rakolta was appointed commissioner general of the U.S. pavilion at Expo 2020 Dubai. His tenure as an ambassador ended on January 19, 2021.

== Personal life ==
Rakolta and his wife Terry Rakolta were married in 1976 and have four children: Paige, Eileen, Lauren, and John Rakolta III. He is a member of the Church of Jesus Christ of Latter-day Saints (LDS Church). Terry Rakolta is the sister of Mitt Romney's former sister-in-law, Ronna Romney. John Rakolta is also the uncle to Republican National Committee Chairwoman Ronna Romney McDaniel.

In 1993, the Rakoltas bought a property on Everglades Island near Palm Beach, Florida. The gardens, designed by Jorge Sanchez, were given the Lesly S. Smith Landscape Award by the Preservation Foundation of Palm Beach in 2013.

In 2018, Rakolta was named Michiganian of the Year by The Detroit News for his advocacy work for the Detroit Public School System.

== Organizations and affiliations ==
- Chairman of New Detroit
- Coalition for the Future of Detroit Schoolchildren (Co-chair)
- Engineering Society of Detroit
- Metropolitan Affairs Coalition (Co-chair)

== Awards and recognition ==
- Black Family Development, Inc's Dr. Gerald K. Smith Award (2014)
- Engineering Society of Detroit's Horace H. Rackham Humanitarian Award
- Marketing and Sales Executives of Detroit's Executive Leadership Award (2014)
- New Detroit's Leadership in Race Relations Award (2015)
- Urban Land Development Michigan Lifetime Achievement Award (2017)
- Woodrow Wilson Award for Corporate Citizenship (2005)

Diplomatic posts
Preceded by Barbara A. Leaf	United States Ambassador to United Arab Emirates; 2019–2021	Succeeded by Martina A. Strong
