= Terry Rakolta =

American activist

Terry Lynn Rakolta
- Born: Terry Lynn Stern; September 18, 1944 (age 81); Bloomfield Hills, Michigan, U.S.
- Occupation: Anti-obscenity activist
- Years active: 1989–1990
- Spouse: John Rakolta (m. 1976)
- Children: 4
- Relatives: Ronna Romney (sister)

Terry Lynn Rakolta (née Stern) is an American former anti-obscenity activist, best known for leading a boycott against the Fox Broadcasting Company sitcom Married... with Children in 1989.

== Life and family ==
Rakolta is a resident of Bloomfield Hills, Michigan. She is married to John Rakolta, the former CEO of Walbridge, and the General Consul for Romania's Honorary General Consulate in Detroit, who served as Ambassador to the United Arab Emirates during the Trump administration.

Rakolta's sister, Ronna Romney, is a Republican political activist and radio talk show host who was formerly married to Scott Romney, the son of former Michigan governor George Romney and brother of former Massachusetts governor and Utah Senator Mitt Romney. Rakolta's husband was a national chairman for Mitt Romney's 2008 presidential campaign. Rakolta is a Mormon.

== Married... with Children boycott ==
Rakolta was prompted to write to the sponsors of Married… with Children after her children watched the episode "Her Cups Runneth Over" on January 15, 1989, in which Al Bundy and his friend Steve purchase a bra for Al's wife, Peggy. That same episode had also showed Al ogling at a naked model in a department store, but with her back facing the camera. Several sponsors decided to cancel their commercials in response.

Fox responded to the boycott by moving the show's time slot from 8:30 to 9:00 p.m. and toning down the level of "raunch" in the series, reducing the amount of sexual content and implied nudity. Fox also decided not to air a potentially offensive episode titled "I'll See You in Court", in which the Bundys attempt to improve their love life by having marital relations in a different setting. Known as the "lost episode", it was finally aired in 2002 on FX and was packaged with the rest of the third season in the 2005 DVD release. The episode has aired outside the United States as a regular episode of season three ever since the show went into syndication.

Rakolta made several appearances on television talk shows and news programs at the time, including Nightline.

While the boycott may briefly have affected the content of Married… with Children, it did little to no economic damage. A year after the boycott, nearly all the defecting advertisers had returned, and ratings improved.

Rakolta and her boycott were referenced in the Married... with Children Season 9 (1994–95) episode "No Pot to Pease In", in which a sitcom based on the Bundys' lives is cancelled because "some woman in Michigan didn't like it."

Rakolta later founded Americans for Responsible Television to fight against other shows that she deemed offensive, including shows by Phil Donahue and Howard Stern.
