= List of Department of State appointments by Donald Trump =

Below is a list of Donald Trump's appointments to the Department of State.

Key
Appointees serving in offices that did not require Senate confirmation.
Appointees confirmed by the Senate.
Appointees awaiting Senate confirmation.
Appointees serving in an acting capacity.
Appointees who have left office or offices which have been disbanded.
Nominees who were withdrawn prior to being confirmed or assuming office.

== Appointments (first administration) ==
Office	Nominee	Assumed office	Left office
Secretary of State	Mike Pompeo	April 26, 2018 (Confirmed April 26, 2018, 57–42)	
Deputy Secretary of State	Stephen Biegun	December 21, 2019 (Confirmed December 19, 2019, 90–3)	
Director General of the Foreign Service	Carol Z. Perez	February 1, 2019 (Confirmed January 2, 2019, voice vote)	
Legal Adviser of the Department of State	Marik String	June 1, 2019	
Under Secretary of State (Arms Control and International Security Affairs)	Christopher Ford	October 21, 2019	January 8, 2021
Under Secretary of State (Economic Growth, Energy, and the Environment)	Keith J. Krach	June 21, 2019 (Confirmed June 20, 2019, voice vote)	
Under Secretary of State (Management)	Brian Bulatao	May 17, 2019 (Confirmed May 16, 2019, 92–5)	
Under Secretary of State (Political Affairs)	David Hale	August 30, 2018 (Confirmed August 28, 2018, voice vote)	
Assistant Secretary of State (African Affairs)	Tibor P. Nagy	July 23, 2018 (Confirmed June 28, 2018, voice vote)	
Assistant Secretary of State (Conflict and Stabilization Operations)	Denise Natali	October 18, 2018 (Confirmed October 11, 2018, voice vote)	December 22, 2020
Assistant Secretary of State (Conflict and Stabilization Operations)	Alexander Alden	December 22, 2020	
Assistant Secretary of State (Consular Affairs)	Carl Risch	August 11, 2017 (Confirmed August 3, 2017, voice vote)	December 22, 2020
Assistant Secretary of State (Democracy, Human Rights, and Labor)	Robert Destro	September 23, 2019 (Confirmed September 18, 2019, 49–44)	
Assistant Secretary of State (Diplomatic Security)	Michael Evanoff	November 3, 2017 (Confirmed November 2, 2017, voice vote)	July 24, 2020
Assistant Secretary of State (East Asian and Pacific Affairs)	David Stilwell	June 20, 2019 (Confirmed June 13, 2019, 94–3)	
Assistant Secretary of State (Economic and Business Affairs)	Manisha Singh	November 22, 2017 (Confirmed November 2, 2017, voice vote)	
Assistant Secretary of State (Educational and Cultural Affairs)	Marie Royce	March 30, 2018 (Confirmed March 22, 2018, voice vote)	
Assistant Secretary of State (Energy Resources)	Frank Fannon	May 29, 2018 (Confirmed May 24, 2018, voice vote)	
Assistant Secretary of State (Intelligence and Research)	Ellen E. McCarthy	January 22, 2019 (Confirmed January 2, 2019, voice vote)	
Assistant Secretary of State (International Narcotics and Law Enforcement Affairs)	Kirsten Madison	May 11, 2018 (Confirmed April 26, 2018, voice vote)	
Assistant Secretary of State (International Organization Affairs)	Jonathan M. Moore	November 29, 2019	March 1, 2020
Assistant Secretary of State (International Security and Nonproliferation)	Christopher Ashley Ford	January 9, 2018 (Confirmed December 21, 2017, voice vote)	January 8, 2021
Assistant Secretary of State (Near Eastern Affairs)	David Schenker	June 14, 2019 (Confirmed June 5, 2019, 83–11)	
Assistant Secretary of State (Political-Military Affairs)	R. Clarke Cooper	May 2, 2019 (Confirmed April 30, 2019, 90–8)	
Chief of Protocol	Cam Henderson	August 12, 2019	
Assistant Secretary of State (Administration)	Carrie Cabelka	August 20, 2019	
Coordinator for Counterterrorism	Nathan Sales	August 10, 2017 (Confirmed August 3, 2017, voice vote)	
Inspector General of the Department of State	Diana Shaw	December 11, 2020	
Office of Foreign Missions
Director of the Office of Foreign Missions	Stephen Akard	September 16, 2019 (Confirmed September 11, 2019, 90–2)	August 7, 2020
Director of the Office of Foreign Missions	Cliff Seagroves	August 6, 2020	
Office to Monitor and Combat Trafficking in Persons
Director of the Office to Monitor and Combat Trafficking in Persons	John Cotton Richmond	November 14, 2018 (Confirmed October 11, 2018, voice vote)	
Member of the U.S. Advisory Council on Human Trafficking	Harold D'Souza	March 2018	
Member of the U.S. Advisory Council on Human Trafficking	Christina Frundt	March 2018	
Member of the U.S. Advisory Council on Human Trafficking	Nathan Paul Kinnicutt	March 2018	
Member of the U.S. Advisory Council on Human Trafficking	Robert R. Lung	March 2018	
Member of the U.S. Advisory Council on Human Trafficking	Ronny Marty	March 2018	
Member of the U.S. Advisory Council on Human Trafficking	Florencia Molina	March 2018	
Member of the U.S. Advisory Council on Human Trafficking	Bukola Oriola	March 2018	
Member of the U.S. Advisory Council on Human Trafficking	Tanya Street	March 2018	
Member of the U.S. Advisory Council on Human Trafficking	Sheila White	March 2018	
International Boundary and Water Commission
Commissioner of the United States Section of the International Boundary and Water Commission for United States and Mexico	Jayne Harkins	September 2018	

== Previous officeholders (first administration) ==
Office	Name	Took office	Left office	Notes
Secretary of State	Rex Tillerson	February 1, 2017	March 31, 2018	Fired March 13, 2018. His tenure was the fifteenth-shortest in the office's 228-year history, and the third-shortest since World War II. (Note: Excluding interim appointments. Behind Edmund Muskie and Lawrence Eagleburger.) Tillerson is the only Secretary of State since at least 1945 to have been fired.
Secretary of State	Thomas A. Shannon Jr.	January 20, 2017	February 1, 2017	
Under Secretary of State (Political Affairs)	Thomas A. Shannon Jr.	February 12, 2016	June 4, 2018	
Deputy Secretary of State	Thomas A. Shannon Jr.	February 1, 2017	May 24, 2017	
Deputy Secretary of State	John Sullivan	May 24, 2017	December 20, 2019	Became Ambassador to Russia.
Secretary of State	John Sullivan	March 31, 2018	April 26, 2018	
Chief of Staff to the Secretary of State	Margaret Peterlin	February 12, 2017	March 31, 2018	
Senior Advisor to the Secretary of State	Michael McKinley	November 2018	October 10, 2019	
Special Representative for Iran	Brian Hook	September 1, 2018	August 6, 2020	
Director of Policy Planning	Brian Hook	February 17, 2017	September 1, 2018	
Director of Policy Planning	Kiron Skinner	September 4, 2018	August 2, 2019	
Chief of Protocol	Sean Lawler	December 1, 2017	July 9, 2019	In June 2019, Lawler was accused of intimidating behavior towards staff and became the subject of an unsubstantiated investigation by the State Department's Office of the Inspector General. He resigned on July 9, 2019.
Under Secretary of State (Management)	Patrick F. Kennedy	November 15, 2007	January 26, 2017	
Under Secretary of State (Arms Control and International Security Affairs)	Andrea L. Thompson	June 18, 2018	October 20, 2019	
Under Secretary of State (Arms Control and International Security Affairs)	Chris Ford	October 21, 2019	January 8, 2021	Originally planning on resigning on January 15, he rescinded his original resignation and submitted a resignation in protest, effective immediately, following the 2021 storming of the U.S. Capitol.
Assistant Secretary of State (International Security and Nonproliferation)	Chris Ford	January 9, 2018	January 8, 2021	Originally planning on resigning on January 15, he rescinded his original resignation and submitted a resignation in protest, effective immediately, following the 2021 storming of the U.S. Capitol.
Assistant Secretary of State (International Security and Nonproliferation)	Thomas M. Countryman	September 29, 2011	January 27, 2017	
Under Secretary of State (Public Diplomacy and Public Affairs)	Steve Goldstein	December 4, 2017	March 13, 2018	Shortly after President Trump dismissed Secretary of State Rex Tillerson on March 13, 2018, Goldstein released a statement that Tillerson did not know why he had been fired and that Tillerson had only learned of his firing that morning from Trump's tweet. Goldstein's statement was seen as contradicting the official account of Tillerson's dismissal, which was that Tillerson was informed on March 9 that Trump intended to replace him, and Goldstein was fired from his position. According to Axios, Goldstein was disliked in the White House and "seen as openly anti-Trump."
Under Secretary of State (Public Diplomacy and Public Affairs)	Heather Nauert	March 13, 2018	October 10, 2018	In December 2018, Trump chose the former Fox & Friends journalist to be the next UN Ambassador, but her nomination was never submitted to the Senate. Nauert left the State Department and joined the board of the Fulbright Program.
Spokesperson for the United States Department of State	Heather Nauert	April 24, 2017	April 3, 2019	In December 2018, Trump chose the former Fox & Friends journalist to be the next UN Ambassador, but her nomination was never submitted to the Senate. Nauert left the State Department and joined the board of the Fulbright Program.
Spokesperson for the United States Department of State	Mark Toner	January 20, 2017	April 27, 2017	
Deputy Spokesperson for the United States Department of State	Mark Toner	June 1, 2015	May 2017	
Legal Adviser of the Department of State	Richard Visek	January 20, 2017	January 22, 2018	
Legal Adviser of the Department of State	Jennifer Gillian Newstead	January 22, 2018	April 22, 2019	
Director General of the Foreign Service	Arnold A. Chacón	December 22, 2014	June 2, 2017	
Assistant Secretary of State (Legislative Affairs)	Mary Kirtley Waters	December 20, 2017	August 31, 2018	Became Director of the United Nations Information Center Washington
Assistant Secretary of State (Legislative Affairs)	Mary Elizabeth Taylor	October 1, 2018	June 18, 2020	Resigned over Trump's response to nationwide protests against racial injustice.
Assistant Secretary of State (East Asian and Pacific Affairs)	Daniel R. Russel	July 16, 2013	March 8, 2017	
Assistant Secretary of State (East Asian and Pacific Affairs)	Susan Thornton	March 9, 2017	July 7, 2018	
Assistant Secretary of State (European and Eurasian Affairs)	A. Wess Mitchell	October 12, 2017	February 15, 2019	
Assistant Secretary of State (Western Hemisphere Affairs)	Kimberly Breier	October 15, 2018	August 30, 2019	Resigned due to internal disputes over immigration policies.
Assistant Secretary of State (Administration)	Joyce Anne Barr	December 19, 2011	January 26, 2017	
Assistant Secretary of State (Consular Affairs)	Michele Thoren Bond	August 10, 2015	January 27, 2017	
Assistant Secretary of State (Educational and Cultural Affairs)	Mark Taplin	January 2017	August 2017	
Assistant Secretary of State (Conflict and Stabilization Operations)	David Malcolm Robinson	January 4, 2016	January 31, 2017	
Assistant Secretary of State (Conflict and Stabilization Operations)	Denise Natali	October 18, 2018	December 22, 2020	
Deputy Assistant Secretary of State, Bureau of Conflict and Stabilization Operations	Mina Chang	April 29, 2019	November 18, 2019	Resigned a week after news reports of apparent past résumé embellishments: 'Resigning is the only acceptable moral and ethical option'.
Assistant Secretary of State (Arms Control, Verification, and Compliance)	Yleem Poblete	April 30, 2018	June 7, 2019	
Assistant Secretary of State (International Organization Affairs)	Kevin Moley	March 29, 2018	November 29, 2019	Retired after an internal department watchdog report accused Moley of mismanagement and harassment of career employees.
State Department Inspector General	Steve Linick	September 30, 2013	May 15, 2020	Fired after starting multiple investigations into Secretary Mike Pompeo: alleged misuse of a political appointee to do tasks for him and Mrs. Pompeo, helping fast-track "emergency" arms sales to Saudi Arabia and potential misuse of State Dept. facilities and diplomatic funds for "Madison dinners". The president said he had lost confidence in Linick.
State Department Inspector General	Stephen Akard	May 15, 2020	August 6, 2020	
Special Adviser to the Iran Action Group	Gabriel Noronha		January 7, 2021	Fired by the White House after writing a tweet condemning the 2021 storming of the U.S. Capitol, referring to President Trump by name.

== Appointments (second administration) ==
Office	Nominee	Assumed office	Left office
Secretary of State	Marco Rubio	January 21, 2025 (Confirmed January 20, 2025, 99–0)	
Secretary of State	Lisa D. Kenna	January 20, 2025	January 21, 2025
Deputy Secretary of State	Christopher Landau	March 25, 2025 (Confirmed March 24, 2025, 60–31)	
Deputy Secretary of State for Management and Resources	Michael Rigas	May 19, 2025 (Confirmed May 14, 2025, 51–46)	
Legal Adviser of the Department of State
Legal Adviser of the Department of State	Brock Dahl	June 15, 2026 (Confirmed June 11, 2026, 49–44)	
Legal Adviser of the Department of State	Reed D. Rubinstein	May 26, 2025 (Confirmed May 15, 2025, 51–46)	June 15, 2026
Legal Adviser of the Department of State	Joshua Simmons	March 29, 2025	May 26, 2025
Legal Adviser of the Department of State	Richard C. Visek	January 20, 2025	March 29, 2025
Inspector General of the Department of State	Carl Anderson	Awaiting Senate Confirmation	
Inspector General of the Department of State	Arne B. Baker	May 1, 2025	
Inspector General of the Department of State	Sandra J. Lewis	January 24, 2025	May 1, 2025
Under Secretary of State for Economic Growth, Energy, and the Environment	Jacob Helberg	October 16, 2025 (Confirmed* October 7, 2025, 51–47); *En bloc confirmation of 107 nominees.	
Under Secretary of State for Economic Growth, Energy, and the Environment	Thomas E. Lertsen	January 20, 2025	October 16, 2025
Under Secretary of State for Arms Control and International Security	Thomas DiNanno	October 10, 2025 (Confirmed* October 7, 2025, 51–47); *En bloc confirmation of 107 nominees.	
Under Secretary of State for Arms Control and International Security	Brent T. Christensen	January 20, 2025	October 10, 2025
Under Secretary of State for Political Affairs	Allison Hooker	June 5, 2025 (Confirmed June 3, 2025, 59–36)	
Under Secretary of State for Political Affairs	Lisa D. Kenna	January 20, 2025	June 5, 2025
Under Secretary of State for Public Diplomacy and Public Affairs	Sarah B. Rogers	October 10, 2025 (Confirmed* October 7, 2025, 51–47); *En bloc confirmation of 107 nominees.	
Under Secretary of State for Public Diplomacy and Public Affairs	Darren Beattie	February 4, 2025	October 10, 2025
Under Secretary of State for Management	Jason S. Evans	September 22, 2025 (Confirmed* September 18, 2025, 51–44); *En bloc confirmation of 48 nominees.	
Under Secretary of State for Management	José Cunningham	April 5, 2025	September 22, 2025
Under Secretary of State for Management	Tibor P. Nagy	January 20, 2025	April 4, 2025
Assistant Secretary of State for Legislative Affairs	Katherine Bowles	September 1, 2026 (Confirmed* August 7, 2026, 51–47); *En bloc confirmation of 74 nominees.	
Assistant Secretary of State for Legislative Affairs	Paul D. Guaglianone	February 1, 2025	June 23, 2026
Assistant Secretary of State for Intelligence and Research	Michael Vance	August 17, 2026 (Confirmed* August 7, 2026, 51–47); *En bloc confirmation of 74 nominees.	
Assistant Secretary of State for Intelligence and Research	Donald Blome	February 3, 2025	August 17, 2026
Assistant Secretary of State for Intelligence and Research	Leila Gardner	January 20, 2025	February 3, 2025
Assistant Secretary of State for African Affairs	Frank Garcia	June 1, 2026 (Confirmed* May 18, 2026, 46–43); *En bloc confirmation of 49 nominees.	
Assistant Secretary of State for African Affairs	Nick Checker	January 6, 2026	June 1, 2026
Assistant Secretary of State for African Affairs	Jonathan Pratt	July 16, 2025	January 6, 2026
Assistant Secretary of State for African Affairs	Troy D. Fitrell	January 20, 2025	July 16, 2025
Assistant Secretary of State for East Asian and Pacific Affairs	Michael G. DeSombre	October 10, 2025 (Confirmed* October 7, 2025, 51–47); *En bloc confirmation of 107 nominees.	
Assistant Secretary of State for East Asian and Pacific Affairs	Y. Kevin Kim	July 18, 2025	October 10, 2025
Assistant Secretary of State for East Asian and Pacific Affairs	Sean O'Neill	January 20, 2025	July 18, 2025
Assistant Secretary of State for European and Eurasian Affairs	Brendan Hanrahan	August 24, 2026 (Confirmed* August 7, 2026, 51–47); *En bloc confirmation of 74 nominees.	
Assistant Secretary of State for European and Eurasian Affairs	Arthur Milikh	April 20, 2026	August 24, 2026
Assistant Secretary of State for European and Eurasian Affairs	Brendan Hanrahan	April 25, 2025	April 20, 2026
Assistant Secretary of State for European and Eurasian Affairs	Louis L. Bono	January 20, 2025	April 25, 2025
Assistant Secretary of State for International Organization Affairs	Jeremy Carl	Nomination withdrawn by the President on March 12, 2026	
Assistant Secretary of State for International Organization Affairs	McCoy Pitt	January 20, 2025	
Assistant Secretary of State for Near Eastern Affairs	Donald Blome	August 17, 2026 (Confirmed* August 7, 2026, 51–47); *En bloc confirmation of 74 nominees.	
Assistant Secretary of State for Near Eastern Affairs	Robert J. Palladino	December 1, 2025	August 17, 2026
Assistant Secretary of State for Near Eastern Affairs	Joel Rayburn	Nomination withdrawn by the President on October 27, 2025	
Assistant Secretary of State for Near Eastern Affairs	Mora Namdar	May 19, 2025	December 1, 2025
Assistant Secretary of State for Near Eastern Affairs	Timothy A. Lenderking	January 20, 2025	May 19, 2025
Assistant Secretary of State for South and Central Asian Affairs	S. Paul Kapur	October 22, 2025 (Confirmed* October 7, 2025, 51–47); *En bloc confirmation of 107 nominees.	
Assistant Secretary of State for South and Central Asian Affairs	Bethany Poulos Morrison	August 20, 2025	October 22, 2025
Assistant Secretary of State for South and Central Asian Affairs	Eric Meyer	January 20, 2025	August 19, 2025
Assistant Secretary of State for Western Hemisphere Affairs	Juan Pablo Segura	August 14, 2026 (Confirmed* August 7, 2026, 51–47); *En bloc confirmation of 74 nominees.	
Assistant Secretary of State for Western Hemisphere Affairs	Michael Kozak	January 20, 2025	August 14, 2026
Assistant Secretary of State for Consular Affairs	Mora Namdar	December 22, 2025 (Confirmed* December 18, 2025, 53–43); *En bloc confirmation of 97 nominees.	
Assistant Secretary of State for Consular Affairs	John Armstrong	February 27, 2025	December 22, 2025
Assistant Secretary of State for Consular Affairs	Julie Stufft	January 20, 2025	February 27, 2025
Assistant Secretary of State for Diplomatic Security	Todd Wilcox	October 14, 2025 (Confirmed* October 7, 2025, 51–47); *En bloc confirmation of 107 nominees.	
Assistant Secretary of State for Diplomatic Security	Paul R. Houston	June 2, 2025	October 14, 2025
Assistant Secretary of State for Diplomatic Security	Carlos Matus	January 20, 2025	May 30, 2025
Assistant Secretary of State for Economic, Energy, and Business Affairs	Caleb Orr	November 12, 2025 (Confirmed November 5, 2025, 57–43)	August 31, 2026
Assistant Secretary of State for Oceans and International Environmental and Scientific Affairs	Wesley Brooks	May 28, 2026 (Confirmed* May 18, 2026, 46–43); *En bloc confirmation of 49 nominees.	
Assistant Secretary of State for Educational and Cultural Affairs	Catherine Dillon	May 18, 2026 (Confirmed* May 18, 2026, 46–43)	
Assistant Secretary of State for Educational and Cultural Affairs	Darren Beattie	February 4, 2025	May 18, 2026
Assistant Secretary of State for Political-Military Affairs	Fleet White	August 14, 2026 (Confirmed* August 7, 2026, 51–47); *En bloc confirmation of 74 nominees.	
Assistant Secretary of State for Political-Military Affairs	Stanley L. Brown	March 11, 2026	August 14, 2026
Assistant Secretary of State for Political-Military Affairs	Fleet White	September 29, 2025	March 11, 2026
Assistant Secretary of State for Political-Military Affairs	Christopher Pratt	Nomination withdrawn by the President on September 29, 2025	
Assistant Secretary of State for Political-Military Affairs	James Holtsnider	January 20, 2025	September 29, 2025
Assistant Secretary of State for Arms Control and Nonproliferation	Christopher Yeaw	December 30, 2025 (Confirmed* December 18, 2025, 53–43); *En bloc confirmation of 97 nominees.	
Assistant Secretary of State for Arms Control and Nonproliferation	Paul Watzlavick	March 7, 2025	December 30, 2025
Assistant Secretary of State for Arms Control and Nonproliferation	Ann K. Ganzer	January 20, 2025	March 7, 2025
Assistant Secretary of State for Democracy, Human Rights, and Labor	Riley Barnes	October 10, 2025 (Confirmed* October 7, 2025, 51–47); *En bloc confirmation of 107 nominees.	
Assistant Secretary of State for International Narcotics and Law Enforcement Affairs	Frank Weiland	May 22, 2026 (Confirmed* May 18, 2026, 46–43); *En bloc confirmation of 49 nominees.	
Assistant Secretary of State for International Narcotics and Law Enforcement Affairs	Frank Weiland	January 20, 2025	June 30, 2025
Assistant Secretary of State for International Narcotics and Law Enforcement Affairs	Chris Landberg	June 30, 2025	May 22, 2026
Assistant Secretary of State for Population, Refugees, and Migration	Andrew Veprek	January 2, 2026 (Confirmed* December 18, 2025, 53–43); *En bloc confirmation of 97 nominees.	
Assistant Secretary of State for Population, Refugees, and Migration	Spencer Chretien	April 27, 2025	January 2, 2026
Assistant Secretary of State for Emerging Threats	Anny Vu	Awaiting Senate Confirmation	
Chief of Protocol	Monica Crowley	May 30, 2025 (Confirmed May 12, 2025, 52–45)	
Coordinator for Counterterrorism	Gregory LoGerfo	May 21, 2026 (Confirmed* May 18, 2026, 46–43); *En bloc confirmation of 49 nominees.	
Assistant Secretary of State for Global Public Affairs	Dylan Johnson	January 30, 2026	
Counselor of the Department of State	Daniel Holler	May 26, 2026	
Counselor of the Department of State	Michael Needham	January 20, 2025	May 26, 2026
Director of Policy Planning	Jeremy Lewin	August 24, 2026	October 27, 2026
Director of Policy Planning	Michael Needham	September 15, 2025	May 26, 2026
Director of Policy Planning	Michael Anton	January 20, 2025	September 15, 2025
Spokesperson for the United States Department of State	Tommy Pigott	May 11, 2026	
Spokesperson for the United States Department of State	Tommy Pigott	August 12, 2025	May 11, 2026
Spokesperson for the United States Department of State	Tammy Bruce	January 20, 2025	August 12, 2025
Office to Monitor and Combat Trafficking in Persons
Director of the Office to Monitor and Combat Trafficking in Persons	Barbera Thornhill	October 13, 2026 (Confirmed* August 7, 2026, 51–47); *En bloc confirmation of 74 nominees.	
Director of the Office to Monitor and Combat Trafficking in Persons	Dave Williams	April 20, 2026	October 13, 2026

== Notes ==
=== Confirmation votes ===
Confirmations by roll call vote (first administration)

Confirmations by voice vote (first administration)

Confirmations by roll call vote (second administration)

Confirmations by voice vote (second administration)
