= Danielle Pletka =

American conservative commentator (born 1963)

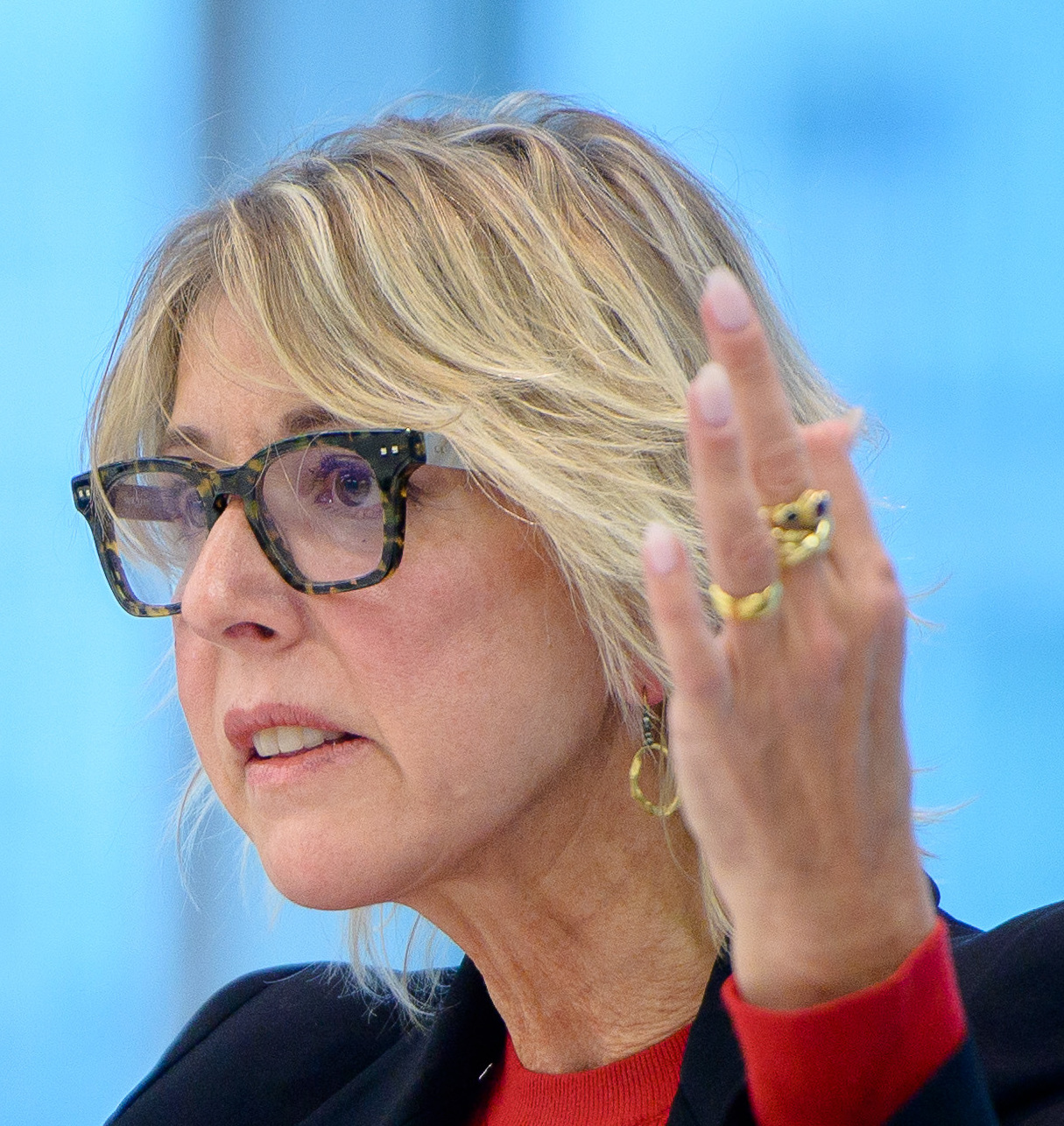
- Danielle Pletka in 2020
- Born: June 12, 1963 (age 62); Melbourne, Victoria, Australia
- Education: Smith College (BA); Johns Hopkins University (MA)
- Spouse: Stephen Rademaker

Danielle "Dany" Pletka (born June 12, 1963) is an American conservative commentator. She is a senior fellow at the American Enterprise Institute (AEI), a conservative think tank, and the former vice president for foreign and defense policy at AEI. She is also an Adjunct Instructor at Georgetown University's Center for Jewish Civilization. From 1992 to 2002, Pletka was a senior professional staff member at the Senate Foreign Relations Committee, working for Republican Jesse Helms.

== Early life and education ==
Born in Australia, Pletka grew up in Boston and became a naturalized U.S. citizen in 1994.

Pletka earned her B.A. (history major) at Smith College in 1984 and her M.A. at Paul H. Nitze School of Advanced International Studies of the Johns Hopkins University.

Pletka is Jewish, appearing on the Sept. 28, 2024 edition of PBS Newshour wearing a Star of David necklace and yellow ribbon pin commemorating the October 7, 2023 hostages kidnapped by Hamas.

== Career ==
Pletka was editorial assistant with the Los Angeles Times and Reuters, working in Jerusalem from 1984 to 1985. She worked as a staff writer for Insight on the News.

Pletka worked as Senior Professional Staff Member for the Near East and South Asia at the Senate Committee on Foreign Relations, for Republican Chairman (and ranking member) Senator Jesse Helms from 1992 to 2002.

In March 2002 Pletka was hired by the American Enterprise Institute (AEI), a conservative Washington, DC think tank, as vice president for foreign and defense policy. At the time of her hiring, The Washington Post described her as "a staunch conservative with a caustic manner." According to Howard J. Wiarda, the fact that Pletka was not a scholar herself created some tension within AEI after she took over the role from Jeane Kirkpatrick, who had a Ph.D and was a full professor at Columbia University. Pletka stepped down as vice president for foreign and defense policy in January 2020, but remains a senior fellow at the institute.

Pletka co-hosts, with Marc Thiessen, the AEI podcast What the Hell is Going On?

== Views ==
Pletka has been described as a prominent neoconservative by Eli Lake, although Howard J. Wiarda described her as not a neoconservative. In a 2008 commentary, Jacob Heilbrunn said that, "Pletka has been closely identified with neocon positions on Iraq and Iran. But now there is tremendous hostility toward her among neocons, who allege that, as a former staffer for Jesse Helms, who embodied more traditional Republican foreign-policy precepts, she is out to extirpate neocon influence at AEI."

Pletka strongly supported the 2003 invasion of Iraq. Pletka was a strong supporter of controversial Iraqi opposition leader Ahmed Chalabi, who was the subject of a U.S. government investigation into allegations that he turned over highly classified information to the Iranian government (allegations that Chalabi denied). Pletka acknowledged that Chalabi was "close to the Iranian government" and had "questionable" associates, but nonetheless asserted that Chalabi had been "shoddily" treated and that CIA and U.S. State Department personnel had fought "a rear guard" action against him. She supported the Iraq War troop surge of 2007, crediting it as a successful counterinsurgency strategy, and criticized President Obama's withdrawal of U.S. troops from Iraq in 2011. In a 2013 retrospective, Pletka stated that she did not regret her support for the 2003 invasion or her opposition to the 2011 withdrawal, although she acknowledged that the U.S. had made mistakes in Iraq.

Pletka has argued that the U.S. should adopt a policy of regime change toward Iran, although not through military intervention. In testimony in 2019 before the House Committee on Foreign Affairs, Pletka argued that the U.S. should seek "to provide sufficient support, incentives and disincentives to ensure the limitation of Iranian reach" in Iraq, and to "end all involvement" of Iranian-backed Popular Mobilization Forces militias in the Iraqi government. Pletka opposed the 2015 nuclear agreement with Iran reached during the Obama administration, but opposed President Trump's move to withdraw the U.S. from the agreement, writing that "dumping the nuclear agreement in Congress's lap may be the worst possible option."

Pletka rejects the scientific consensus on global warming. She has argued that there is "hysteria" over the topic of climate change and that mainstream media narratives fail to account for "global cooling". Pletka falsely claimed that 2016 and 2017 were the two coldest years on record over a 100-year period; in fact, climate data show those two years to be among the warmest years. In a November 2018 appearance on the Sunday morning talk show Meet the Press, Pletka cast doubt on the scientific validity behind a recently released report by the U.S. government on projected economic damages caused by climate change; NBC's invitation to Pletka to appear on the show was criticized by Jon Allsop, writing in the Columbia Journalism Review, and Jack Holmes, politics editor at Esquire magazine.

In 2005, Pletka described herself as "not a big fan of torture" but suggested its use was justifiable under certain circumstances in wartime, when "if it is absolutely imperative to find something out at that moment." In 2014, Pletka criticized the Senate Intelligence Committee report on CIA torture, which condemned the CIA for engaging in torture techniques. Pletka described the report as "Feinstein's partisan screed" and argued that the CIA techniques provided actionable intelligence and were legally allowed by the Justice Department.

In 2020, she wrote in an op-ed for The Washington Post that she "may be forced to vote for" incumbent Republican President Donald Trump because "he wears his sins on the outside" while Pletka feared that the Democratic nominee Joe Biden "would begin an assault on the institutions of government that preserve the nation’s small 'd' democracy." This op-ed was criticized by Washington Post columnist Alexandra Petri in a piece entitled "I can’t believe you’re forcing me to vote for Trump, which I definitely didn’t already want to do."

In March 2024, Pletka considered Iran’s nuclear breakout time at zero. Referring to an independent report, Pletka spoke about the change in American and European policies towards Iran. Citing examples of oil sales, economic growth, and Iran's military cooperation with other countries, Pletka implicitly talks about the potential possibility of Iran building nuclear weapons and Iran's nuclear deterrent power.

== Personal life ==
Pletka is married to Stephen Rademaker, who was Assistant Secretary of State for International Security and Nonproliferation (including head of the Bureau of Arms Control) in the administration of President George W. Bush.
