= Christopher Ford =

Christopher Ford may refer to:

- Christopher Ford (screenwriter), American film screenwriter, producer, and actor
- Christopher Ashley Ford (born 1967), American lawyer and government official
- Chris Ford (1949–2023), American basketball player and coach
- Chris Ford (wrestler) or Crowbar (born 1974), American professional wrestler
