= Bonnie Jenkins =

American diplomat

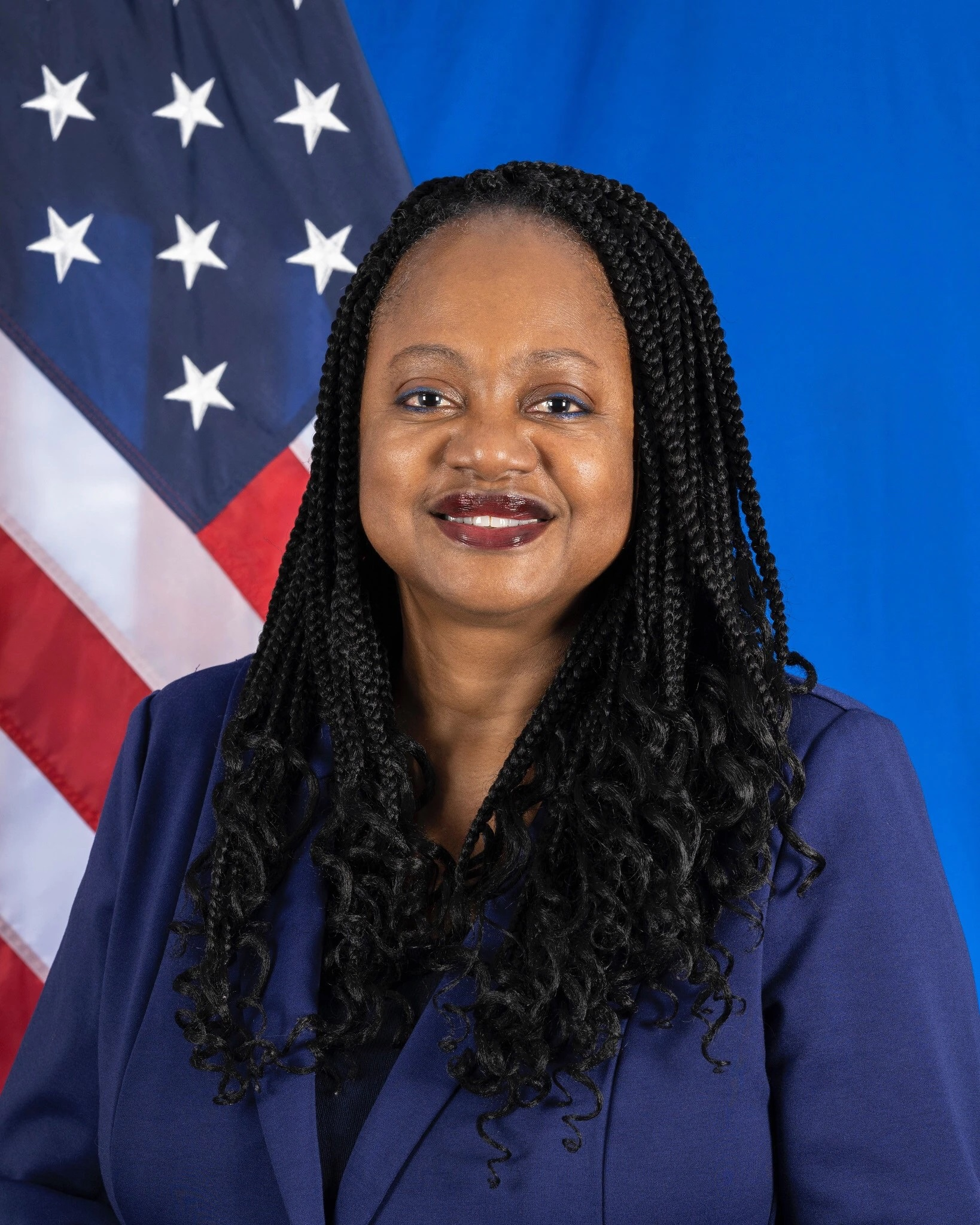

18th Under Secretary of State for Arms Control and International Security Affairs
- In office July 22, 2021 – December 31, 2024
- President: Joe Biden
- Preceded by: Andrea L. Thompson
- Succeeded by: Thomas G. DiNanno

Coordinator for Threat Reduction Programs
- In office July 13, 2009 – January 19, 2017
- President: Barack Obama
- Preceded by: Position established
- Succeeded by: Vacant

Personal details
- Born: New York City, New York, U.S.
- Education: Amherst College (BA); State University of New York, Albany (JD, MPA); Georgetown University (LLM); University of Virginia (PhD)

Bonnie Denise Jenkins (born in Queens, New York) is an American diplomat who served as the Under Secretary of State for Arms Control and International Security in the Biden Administration. During the Obama administration, she was the U.S. Department of State's coordinator for threat reduction programs in the Bureau of International Security and Nonproliferation. She is currently the Shapiro Visiting Professor at George Washington University's Elliott School of International Affairs.

== Early life and education ==
Jenkins "didn't come from lots of money or anything" while growing up in the South Bronx and credited access to scholarships as a means to advance her education.

Jenkins received a Bachelor of Arts with majors in psychology and black studies from Amherst College in 1982. She received a Juris Doctor and a Master of Public Administration from the State University of New York at Albany in 1988. She received a Master of Laws in international and comparative law from Georgetown University in 1995, and a Doctor of Philosophy in international relations from the University of Virginia in 2005.

== Career ==
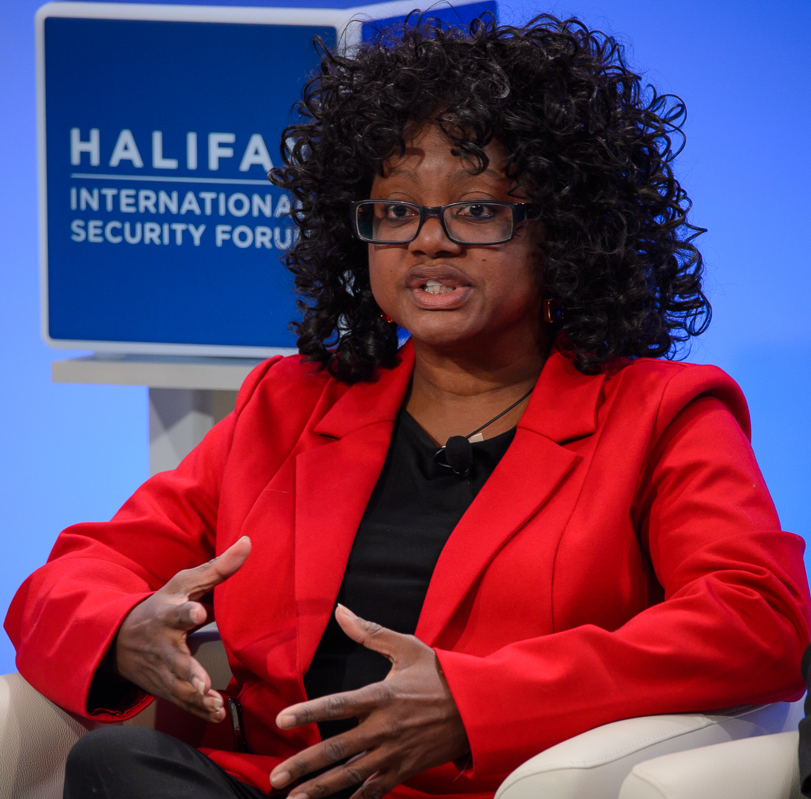
Jenkins at the Halifax International Security Forum 2017

=== Legal government career ===
Jenkins entered government as a Presidential Management Fellow serving in varying capacities in the Office of the Secretary of Defense and later the Office of Management and Budget. After completion of her fellowship, Jenkins served as a legal advisor for the Arms Control and Disarmament Agency to U.S. ambassadors and delegations negotiating arms control and nonproliferation treaties for almost a decade. After the Agency disbanded, Jenkins served as General Counsel to the U.S. commission to assess the organization of the federal government to combat the proliferation of weapons of mass destruction, and as a consultant to the 2000 National Commission on Terrorism.

Jenkins served as counsel on the 9/11 Commission. She was the lead Commission staff member on counter-terrorism policy in the Office of the Secretary of Defense and on U.S. military plans targeting al Qaeda prior to 9/11.

=== Academic career ===
In the fall of 2000, Jenkins began her Ph.D. in international relations from the University of Virginia. During her studies, Jenkins served as a summer research fellow at the RAND Corporation's national security division focusing on weapons of mass destruction. Additionally, she was a pre-doctoral fellow at Harvard University's Belfer Center for Science and International Affairs. During her years at Belfer, she served as an advisor at Harvard Law School's Bernard Koteen Office of Public Interest Advising. She completed her studies in 2005 with a thesis entitled Why International Instruments to Combat Nuclear Proliferation Succeed or Fail: A Study of Interaction of International and Domestic Level Factors and served as the program officer for U.S. foreign and security policy at the Ford Foundation. Her grant-making responsibilities sought to strengthen public engagement in U.S. foreign and security policy debate and formulation. She promoted support for multiculturalism, the peaceful resolution of disputes, and the international rule of law. She has been an adjunct professor at Georgetown University Law School and co-led arms control and nonproliferation simulated negotiations at Stanford University's Center for International Center and Security Cooperation. She is currently the Shapiro Visiting Professor at George Washington University's Elliott School of International Affairs.

=== Military career ===
Jenkins began her military career in the United States Air Force Judge Advocate General's Corps in the Air Force Reserves. Later she transferred to the U.S. Naval Reserves, serving over twenty years including in support of Operation Enduring Freedom. She received numerous awards in her time as an officer in the Naval Reserve, including the Navy and Marine Corps Commendation Medal, the Navy and Marine Corps Achievement Medal, the Joint Service Commendation Medal, the Global War on Terrorism Service Medal, the Global War on Terrorism Service Medal, and the Navy Pistol Marksman Ribbon.

=== In the Obama administration ===
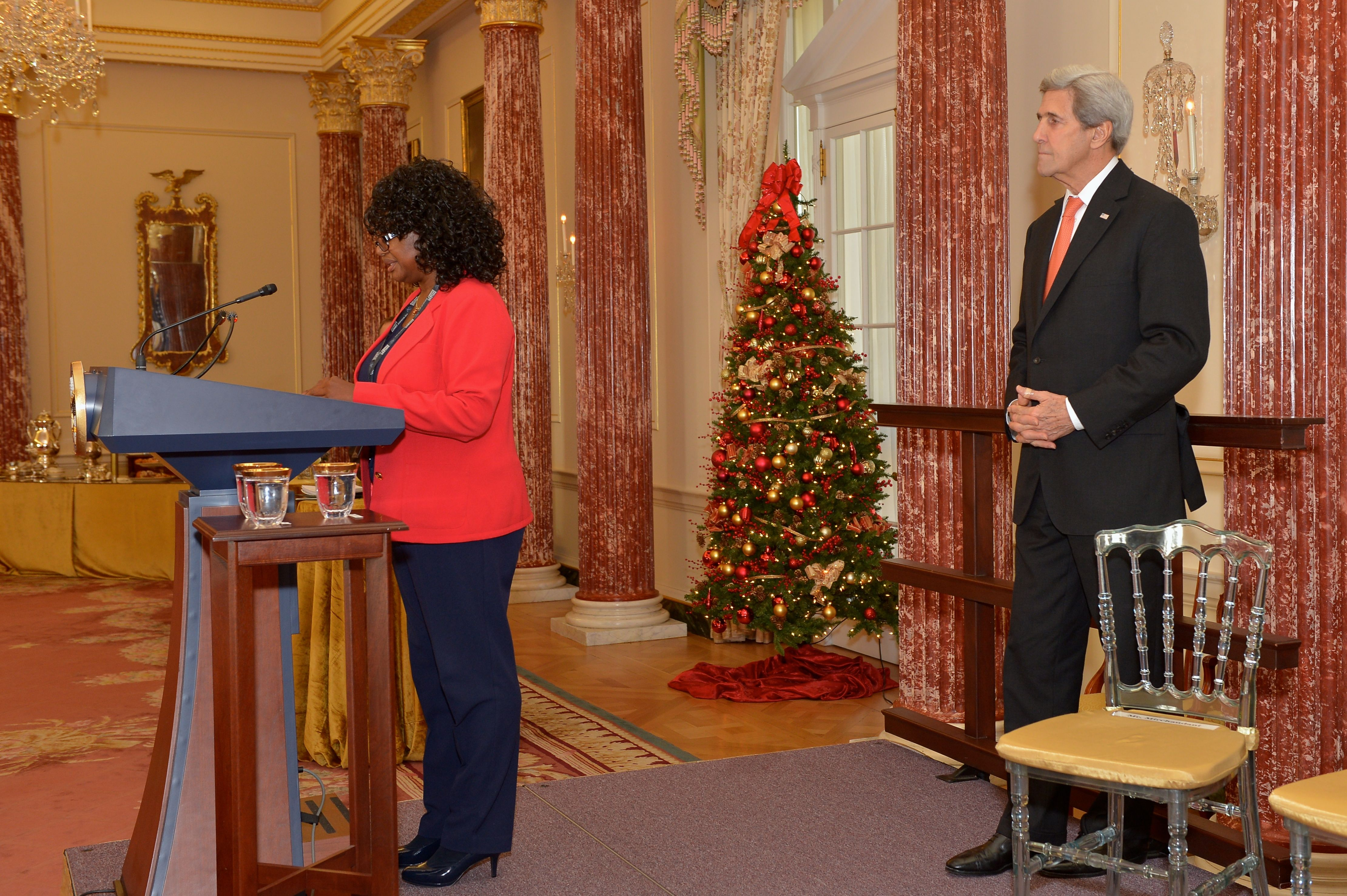
Jenkins with Secretary of State John Kerry in 2016

Jenkins was selected as the U.S. Department of State's Coordinator for Threat Reduction Programs in the Bureau of International Security and Nonproliferation in the Obama Administration with the rank of ambassador. She was also the U.S. representative to the G7 Global Partnership Against the Spread of Weapons and Materials of Mass Destruction (WMD) and chaired the Global Partnership in 2012. She was the Department of State lead on the Nuclear Security Summit, and coordinated the Department of State's activities related to the effort to secure vulnerable nuclear materials. Jenkins formerly coordinated the Department of State's Cooperative Threat Reduction (CTR) programs and helped promote these programs internationally. Jenkins engaged in outreach efforts and regularly briefed United States Combatant Commands about WMD programs in their area of responsibility, worked closely with relevant international organizations and multilateral initiatives, and with non-governmental organizations engaged in CTR-related activities. She was a legal adviser on the Comprehensive Nuclear Test Ban Treaty (CTBT), the Chemical Weapons Convention, and the Conventional Forces in Europe Treaty, among others. She has also served as U.S. legal adviser on relevant treaty implementing bodies, such as the CTBT Organization (CTBTO), and the Organisation for the Prohibition of Chemical Weapons (OPCW).

Jenkins was also engaged in the Global Health Security Agenda (GHSA), which is an international effort with over 50 countries to reduce infections disease threats such as Ebola and Zika. Launched in February 2014, Jenkins has worked closely with governments to help ensure they recognize that GHSA is a multi-sectoral effort requiring the engagement of all relevant stakeholders to prevent, detect, and respond to infectious disease threats. Jenkins leads an international effort to engage non-governmental stakeholders in the GHSA and she has also developed a GHSA Next Generation network.

Jenkins has dedicated significant attention to the engagement of Africa in the threat of chemical, biological, radiological and nuclear weapons and working closely with the Defense Threat Reduction Agency (DTRA), has developed a program named Threat Reduction in Africa (TRIA) to help ensure that U.S. programs and activities in CBRN security are well-coordinated and as accurately as possible meet the needs of countries where those programs are engaged.

Jenkins served as the Leadership Liaison for the Department of State's Veterans-at-State Affinity Group. She also served on the Department of State's Diversity Governance Board.

=== In the Trump administration ===
In September 2017, Jenkins founded the non-profit Women of Color Advancing Peace and Security (WCAPS) to advance the leadership and professional development of women of color in the fields of international peace, security, and conflict transformation. She led the organization until mid-2021 when she returned to government service.

In November 2020, Jenkins was named a volunteer member of the Joe Biden presidential transition Agency Review Team to support transition efforts related to the United States Department of State.

=== In the Biden administration ===
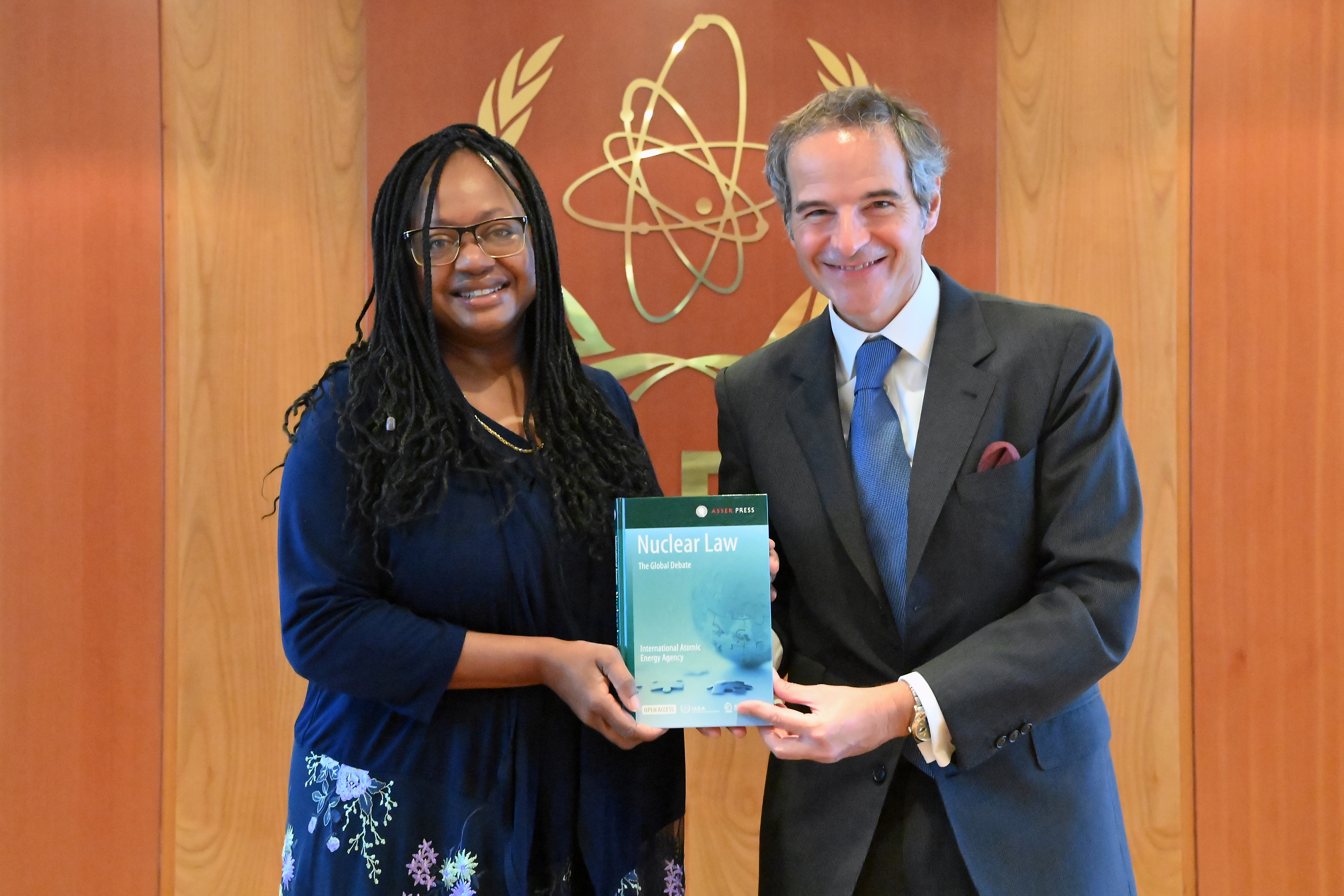
Jenkins with IAEA Director General Rafael Grossi in 2022

In March 2021, President Biden nominated Jenkins to be Under Secretary of State for Arms Control and International Security Affairs. Hearings were held by the Senate Foreign Relations Committee on Jenkins' nomination on April 28, 2021. On May 25, 2021, the committee favorably reported her nomination to the Senate floor. On July 21, 2021, Jenkins was confirmed by the Senate in a vote of 52–48.

Jenkins assumed office on July 22, 2021.

== Personal life ==
Jenkins is an alumna of A Better Chance, a non-profit which assists gifted young people of color attend highly ranked secondary schools, gaining attendance to The Spence School in New York City for high school. She became an honorary member of Delta Sigma Theta sorority in 2023.

Diplomatic posts
New office	Coordinator for Threat Reduction Programs; 2009–2017	Vacant
Political offices
Preceded by Andrea L. Thompson	Under Secretary of State for Arms Control and International Security Affairs; 2021–2024	Succeeded by Thomas G. DiNanno
