= Pletka =

Pletka is a surname. Notable people with the surname include:

- Danielle Pletka (born 1963), American conservative commentator
- Václav Pletka (born 1979), Czech ice hockey player
