= C.S. Eliot Kang =

American diplomat (born 1962)

C. S. Eliot Kang
- 강주순
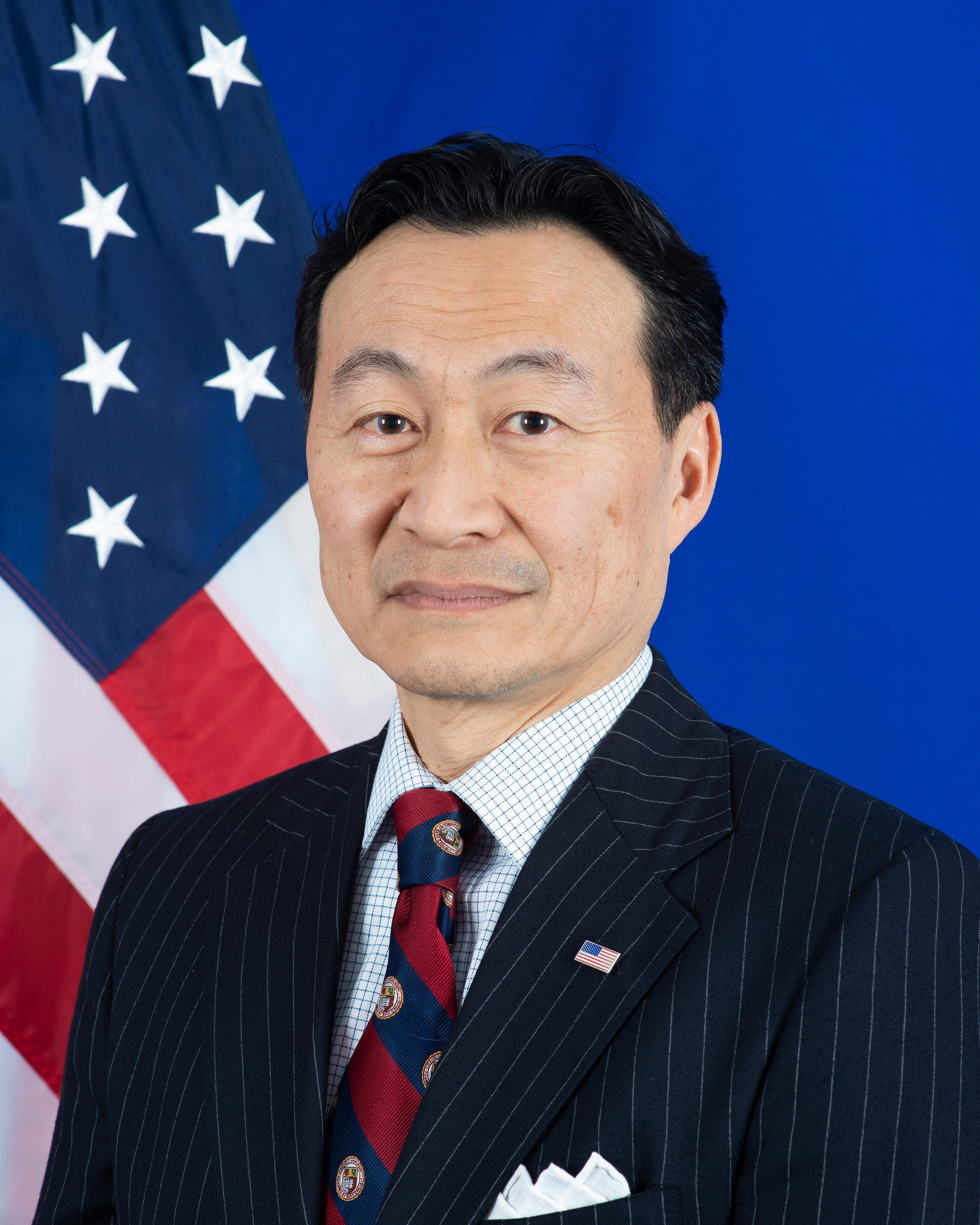
- Official portrait, 2022

4th Assistant Secretary of State for International Security and Nonproliferation
- In office January 8, 2021 – January 20, 2025; Acting: January 8, 2021 – March 31, 2022
- President: Donald Trump; Joe Biden
- Preceded by: Christopher Ashley Ford
- Succeeded by: Christopher Yeaw
- In office January 27, 2017 – January 8, 2018; Acting
- President: Donald Trump
- Preceded by: Thomas M. Countryman
- Succeeded by: Christopher Ashley Ford
- In office January 20, 2009 – June 15, 2009; Acting
- President: Barack Obama
- Preceded by: Patricia McNerney
- Succeeded by: Vann Van Diepen (Acting)

Personal details
- Born: Choo Soon Kang; 1962 (age 63–64)
- Children: 2
- Education: Cornell University (AB); Yale University (MA, MPhil, PhD)

Choo Soon Eliot Kang (born in 1962 as Korean: 강주순) is a retired American diplomat and member of the Senior Executive Service. He served as the Assistant Secretary for the Bureau of International Security and Nonproliferation (ISN) at the U.S. Department of State from March 2022 to January 2025.

From December 2024 to January 2025, January to July 2021, and January 2017 to January 2018, Kang also exercised the authority of the Under Secretary of State for Arms Control and International Security. He also served as acting ISN Assistant Secretary from January 2021 to March 2022, January 2017 to January 2018, and January to June 2009.

Kang is a leading expert on nuclear affairs, including on nuclear safeguards, security, and safety matters as well as denuclearization, counterproliferation, and counter nuclear terrorism issues. Also, he has led on export control diplomacy and policies to prevent and roll back the spread of weapons of mass destruction and their delivery systems as well as to protect critical and emerging technologies from diversion and misuse.

== Early life and education ==
Eliot Kang is the son of Ho Ryun Kang (강호륜), a former South Korean government official and retired Air Force brigadier general residing in the United States, who was awarded the Distinguished Flying Cross, the Legion of Merit, and other medals by the U.S. Government for his actions during the Korean War. Kang's maternal great-grandfather, the late Yim Heung Soon (임흥순), was the chairman of the National Defense Committee of the Korean National Assembly during the Korean War and served as the Mayor of Seoul in 1959 and 1960.

After graduating from Lakewood High School in Lakewood Township, New Jersey, Kang earned a Bachelor of Arts from Cornell University in 1984 and then received his M.A., M.Phil., and Ph.D. from Yale University.

== Career ==
=== Early career ===
Before joining the State Department as a William C. Foster Fellow in 2003, Eliot Kang was a tenured professor of political science. He taught international security at the University of Pennsylvania and Northern Illinois University and has held fellowships at the Council on Foreign Relations and the Brookings Institution. He has published extensively; his writings have appeared in such publications as International Organization, World Affairs, and Comparative Strategy.

During the late 1980s, Kang worked on Wall Street as an investment banker. He specialized in corporate finance and mergers & acquisitions for Dillon, Read & Co., Inc. Kang is a member of the Council on Foreign Relations. He became a Term Member in 1997 and was elected a Life Member in 2002.

=== Bush administration ===
During the administration of President George W. Bush, Kang held various senior positions in the State Department, including in the Bureau of Arms Control and Bureau of Political-Military Affairs. In the Bureau of International Security and Nonproliferation, he served as the Deputy Assistant Secretary of State for Threat Reduction, Export Controls, and Negotiations. He led U.S. efforts to tighten export controls against the proliferation of weapons of mass destruction and their delivery vehicles. Kang also served as the senior nonproliferation policy adviser on the U.S. delegations to the Six-Party Talks under the leadership of Christopher R. Hill. He participated in the sixth round of the Six-Party Talks that produced the 13 February 2007 Joint Statement, resulting in the closure Yongbyon nuclear facility and the invitation of IAEA inspectors to conduct monitoring and verification measures. In October 2008, he accompanied Christopher R. Hill on his last visit to North Korea He attempted to work out with the North Koreans a verification protocol for denuclearization as Hill tried to shore up the flagging momentum in the Six-Party Talks process.

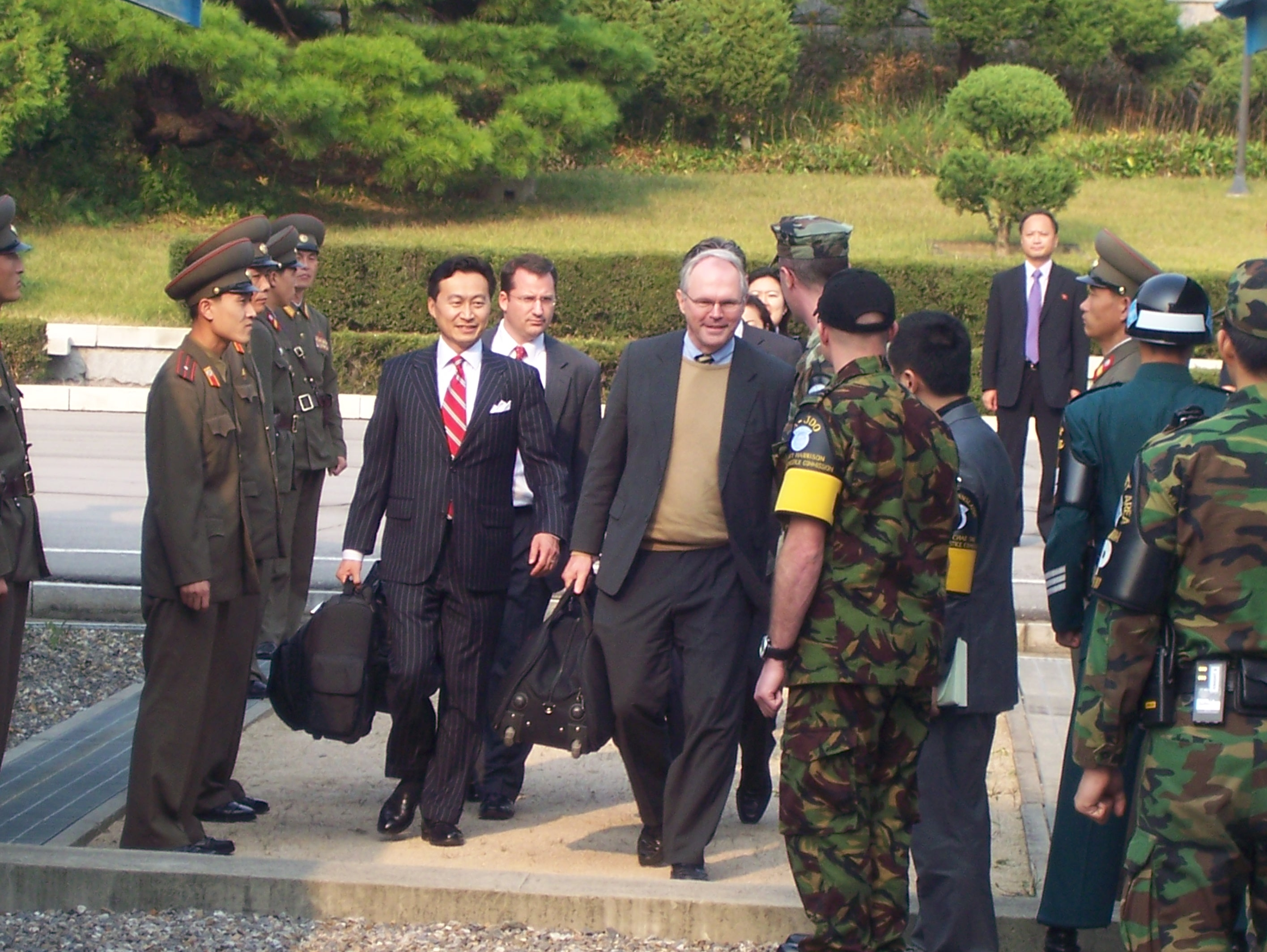

=== Obama Administration ===
During the Presidential transition between George W. Bush and Barack Obama, Kang served for six months as the Acting Assistant Secretary of State for International Security and Nonproliferation. Afterwards, he continued to focus on nuclear issues, leading U.S. diplomatic efforts in various international nuclear fora and multinational negotiations. In 2009, as President Obama launched his Nuclear Security Summit process, Kang co-chaired the 2009 Global Initiative to Combat Nuclear Terrorism (GICNT) in the Hague. He delivered a personal message from the President committing his full support for the Initiative and welcoming 75 nations that joined it. While serving as the Deputy Assistant Secretary of State for Nuclear Affairs (2011–2016), Kang was accorded by President Obama the personal rank of ambassador in preparation for the February 2015 Diplomatic Conference for the Convention on Nuclear Safety. The international community, divided on the future of nuclear energy, was slow to respond to acute nuclear safety concerns that arose following the 2011 Fukushima nuclear disaster. The leading international forum addressing nuclear safety, Convention on Nuclear Safety, was mired in diplomatic deadlock, as anti-nuclear energy political pressure began to build, especially in Europe. Leading the U.S. delegation to the Diplomatic Conference, Kang secured the swift adoption of a consensus approach to resolving the deadlock. The compromise made possible the adoption of the Vienna Declaration on Nuclear Safety, a milestone in the ongoing international efforts to improve nuclear safety as nuclear energy remains viable but continues to be controversial.

=== Trump administration ===
On January 22, 2017, Kang was appointed Principal Deputy Assistant Secretary of the Bureau of International Security and Nonproliferation (ISN). Throughout 2017, he acted as ISN's Assistant Secretary and concurrently exercised the authorities of the Under Secretary of State for Arms Control and International Security. During the Trump administration, Kang played a critical leadership role in countering the PRC's Military-Civil Fusion (MCF) efforts in the nuclear energy sector. Indeed, with the reemergence of great power competition, he also helped to lead U.S. efforts to prevent cutting-edge technologies and know-how from being diverted to U.S. adversaries. In early 2018, under Kang's leadership, the State Department launched the Multilateral Action on Sensitive Technology (MAST). He opened the inaugural gathering of like-minded partners to consider ways to protect rapidly developing technologies such as artificial intelligence (AI) and quantum computing from authoritarian regimes that seek to acquire sophisticated technology from advanced industrialized democracies and to use it in support of revisionist goals that undermine human rights and strategic stability.

=== Biden administration ===
As ISN's acting Assistant Secretary in the first six months of the Biden administration, for the second time, Kang exercised the authorities of the Under Secretary of State for Arms Control and International Security. On April 12, 2021, President Joe Biden nominated Kang to be the Assistant Secretary of State for International Security and Nonproliferation. A hearing on his nomination was held before the Senate Foreign Relations Committee on September 15, 2021. He was confirmed by the United States Senate on March 29, 2022. During the Biden administration, Kang played a key role during the conceptual stage of AUKUS. In the months prior to the initial announcement of AUKUS in September 2021, he led the State Department participation in the trilateral and interagency deliberations and negotiations. And, as he contributed to the implementation of AUKUS Pillar 1 as well as Pillar 2, Kang played a leadership role in the larger plurilateral and multilateral efforts with U.S. allies and like-minded partners to protect as well as promote strategically relevant critical and emerging technologies such as advanced semiconductors, AI, and quantum computing. In December 2024, Kang was again delegated the authorities of the Under Secretary of State for Arms Control and International Security. He resigned as Assistant Secretary on January 20, 2025.

== Awards and recognitions ==
Kang is a recipient of a State Department Distinguished Honor Award as well as multiple State Department Superior Honor Awards. In 2018, he received from President Donald Trump a congressionally established Presidential Rank Award, one of the most prestigious awards in the federal career service, at the Meritorious Executive Rank. In 2022, President Joe Biden conferred on him the rank of Distinguished Executive in the Senior Executive Service.

== Personal life ==
Kang is married to Michelle Kang and has two sons, both born in Illinois.

== Selected publications, speeches, testimonies, remarks ==
- "Understanding the Past and Navigating the Future of Civil Nuclear Energy," Colorado School of Mines, November 13, 2024.
- Protecting Emerging Technologies for Peace and Stability in the Indo-Pacific, Testimony of Assistant Secretary C.S. Eliot Kang Bureau of International Security and Nonproliferation U.S. Department of State, January 17, 2024.
- Keynote Remarks at the Integrated Support Center for Nuclear Nonproliferation and Nuclear Security International Forum, Japan Atomic Energy Agency, Tokyo, Japan, December 14, 2023.
- The Changing Landscape of Nonproliferation and International Security, Timbie Forum, Washington, DC. October 17, 2023.
- "Rogue Proliferators: Nonproliferation Threats Posed by Iran, Syria, Russia, and North Korea," Foundation for Defense of Democracies, December 1, 2022.
- Keynote Address to CSIS-FKI Webinar, Virtual via Zoom, April 3, 2023.
- Remarks for the Columbia University Center on Global Energy Policy’s Webinar on the Nuclear Suppliers Group, February 8, 2022.
- Statement of Dr. C.S. Eliot Kang Nominee to be Assistant Secretary of State For International Security and Nonproliferation, U.S. Senate Committee on Foreign Relations, September 15, 2021.
- "Nuclear Weapons, International Security, and Non-proliferation in the 2020s," in Maiani L., Jeanloz R., Lowenthal M., Plastino W. (eds) International Cooperation for Enhancing Nuclear Safety, Security, Safeguards and Non-proliferation, (Springer Proceedings in Physics, Vol 243), pp. 35–39.
- Opening Remarks for the NATO North Atlantic Council, Brussels, Belgium, May 5, 2017.
- “Japan and Inter-Korean Relations” in ed. Samuel Kim, Inter-Korean Relations: Problems and Prospects (Palgrave, 2004), pp. 97–116.
- “Restructuring the US-South Korea alliance to deal with the second Korean nuclear crisis,” Australian Journal of International Affairs Vol. 57, No. 2 (July 2003), pp. 309–324.
- “The Developmental State and Democratic Consolidation in South Korea,” in ed. Samuel Kim, Korea’s Democratization (Cambridge University Press, 2003), pp. 220–244.
- “Institutionalizing the Regulation of Inward Foreign Direct Investment,” in eds. Andrew P. Cortell and Susan Peterson, ALTERED STATES: International Relations, Domestic Politics, and Institutional Change (Lexington Books, 2002), pp. 169–193.
- (Lead author, with Y. Kaseda) “Korea and the Dynamics of Japan’s Post-Cold War Security Policy,” World Affairs Vol. 164, No. 2 (Fall 2001), pp. 51–59.
- “North Korea and the U.S. Grand Strategy,” Comparative Strategy Vol. 20, No. 1 (January–March 2001), pp. 25–43.
- “Segyehwa Reform of the South Korean Developmental State,” in ed. Samuel S. Kim, Korea’s Globalization (Cambridge University Press, 2000), pp. 76–101.
- “The Four-Party Peace Talks: Lost Without a Map,” Comparative Strategy Vol. 17, No. 4 (October–December 1998), pp. 327–344.
- “US politics and greater regulation of inward foreign direct investment,” International Organization Vol. 51, No. 2 (Spring 1997), pp. 301–333.
