= John Rood =

American politician (born 1968)

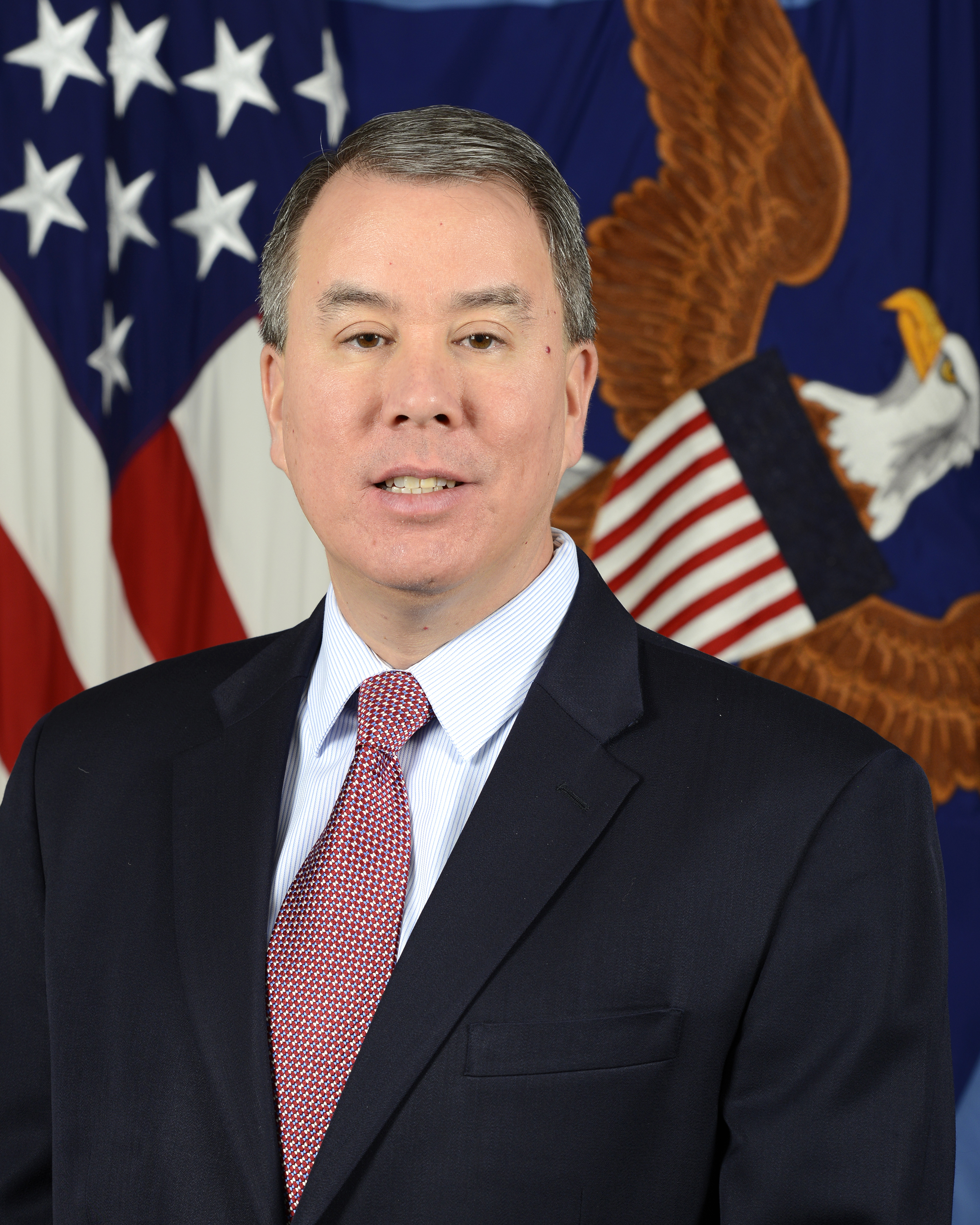

12th Under Secretary of Defense for Policy
- In office January 9, 2018 – February 28, 2020
- President: Donald Trump
- Preceded by: Christine Wormuth
- Succeeded by: Colin Kahl

Acting Under Secretary of State for Arms Control and International Security
- In office September 28, 2007 – January 20, 2009
- President: George W. Bush
- Preceded by: Robert Joseph
- Succeeded by: Ellen Tauscher

1st Assistant Secretary of State for International Security and Nonproliferation
- In office October 2, 2006 – September 27, 2007
- President: George W. Bush
- Preceded by: Position established
- Succeeded by: Thomas M. Countryman (2011)

Personal details
- Born: John Charles Rood; 1968 (age 57–58)
- Party: Republican
- Education: Arizona State University, Tempe (BS)

John Charles Rood (born 1968) is an American national security adviser, corporate executive, and former government official. He currently serves as the Chief Executive Officer of Momentus Space, a commercial space infrastructure company. He previously served as the Under Secretary of Defense for Policy from January 2018 to February 2020. Before that, he was Senior Vice President of Lockheed Martin where he oversaw international business. He also served as vice president for Domestic Business Development at Lockheed Martin and he was a vice president at the Raytheon Company.

== Early life and education ==
Rood was born in 1968. He earned a Bachelor of Science degree in economics from Arizona State University.

== Career ==
Rood also served as Acting Under Secretary of State for Arms Control and International Security from September 2007 to January 2009, and as Assistant Secretary of State for International Security and Nonproliferation from October 2006 to September 2007. He served at the United States National Security Council as special assistant to the president and senior director of Counterproliferation and Director of Proliferation Strategy for Counterproliferation in Homeland Defense. Rood served at the Defense Department as Deputy Assistant Secretary of Defense for Forces Policy, and at the Central Intelligence Agency as an analyst following missile programs in foreign countries. In addition, he served as senior policy advisor to U.S. Senator Jon Kyl of Arizona.

On October 16, 2017, Rood was nominated by President Donald Trump to become the Under Secretary of Defense for Policy. He was confirmed by the United States Senate on January 3, 2018. In January 2018, Secretary James N. Mattis released the National Defense Strategy (NDS) which placed the order of priorities for the Department of Defense as China, Russia, North Korea, Iran and then Countering Terrorism. As the Under Secretary of Defense for Policy, Rood was responsible for the implementation of the NDS worldwide. On February 19, 2020, Rood was asked to leave the administration by President Trump and offered his resignation effective February 28, 2020.

Following his departure from the government, Rood returned to the private sector. In 2023, he was appointed as the Chief Executive Officer of Momentus Space, where he has directed the company's strategic pivot toward national security space architecture and advanced orbital robotics.

== See also ==
- Trump–Ukraine scandal

Government offices
Preceded by Robert Joseph	Under Secretary of State for Arms Control and International Security; 2007–2009	Succeeded by Ellen Tauscher
