= Christopher Ashley Ford =

American government employee (born 1967)

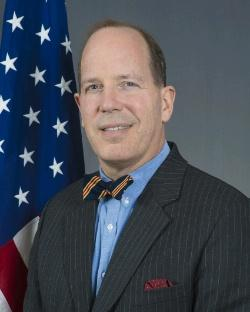

Under Secretary of State for Arms Control and International Security Affairs
- Acting
- In office October 21, 2019 – January 8, 2021
- President: Donald Trump
- Preceded by: Andrea L. Thompson
- Succeeded by: C.S. Eliot Kang (acting)
- In office January 9, 2018 – April 30, 2018
- President: Donald Trump
- Preceded by: C.S. Eliot Kang (acting)
- Succeeded by: Andrea L. Thompson

3rd Assistant Secretary of State for International Security and Nonproliferation
- In office January 9, 2018 – January 8, 2021
- President: Donald Trump
- Preceded by: Thomas M. Countryman
- Succeeded by: C.S. Eliot Kang

Personal details
- Born: 1967 (age 58–59)
- Party: Republican
- Education: Harvard University (BA); Christ Church, Oxford (MA, DPhil); Yale University (JD)

Christopher Ashley Ford (born 1967) is an American lawyer and government official who served from January 2018 until January 2021 as Assistant Secretary of State for International Security and Nonproliferation. He was nominated to that position by President Donald Trump, and confirmed unanimously by the U.S. Senate on December 21, 2017. After October 21, 2019, Ford also, by delegation from Secretary of State Michael Pompeo, performed the duties of the Under Secretary of State for Arms Control and International Security until his resignation from the Department of State on January 8, 2021.

Before his appointment as Assistant Secretary of State, Ford served in the first Trump administration as Special Assistant to the President and Senior Director for Weapons of Mass Destruction and Counterproliferation on the United States National Security Council staff, and a senior U.S. State Department official in the George W. Bush administration working on issues of nuclear proliferation and arms control verification and compliance policy. He has also worked as a Senate staffer, as well as for the Hudson Institute.

== Education and personal life ==
Ford graduated from the Cincinnati Country Day School and received his bachelor's degree summa cum laude from Harvard College in 1989. He attended Oxford University as a Rhodes Scholar and received his doctorate in International Relations there in 1992. He graduated from Yale Law School in 1995.

Ford served as an intelligence officer in the United States Navy Reserve during 1994–2011, receiving an honorable discharge at the rank of Lieutenant Commander in December 2011. Ford has been a member of the Order of Saint John since 2007, and in September 2017 was promoted by Elizabeth II of the United Kingdom to the rank of Commander in that order.

== Career ==
Ford worked at the law firm of Shea & Gardner in Washington, D.C. before serving as Assistant Counsel to the Intelligence Oversight Board in 1996. He then joined the staff of the U.S. Senate's investigation into campaign finance abuses run by Senator Fred Thompson (R-Tennessee) in 1997. During his subsequent service on several Senate staffs, he worked as national security advisor to Senator Susan Collins (R-Maine), chief investigative counsel for the Governmental Affairs Committee, and staff director and chief counsel of the Permanent Subcommittee on Investigations. He joined the staff of the Senate Select Committee on Intelligence (SSCI) just after the terrorist attacks of September 11, 2001, serving there under Vice Chairman Richard Shelby (R-Alabama) and then-Chairman Pat Roberts (R-Kansas), first as Minority Counsel and then as General Counsel.

Ford joined the U.S. State Department in 2003, as Principal Deputy Assistant Secretary of State in what was then the department's Bureau of Verification and Compliance under Assistant Secretary of State Paula A. DeSutter, Under Secretary of State for Arms Control and International Security Affairs John Bolton, and Secretary of State Colin Powell. In December 2006, he was named U.S. Special Representative for Nuclear Non-proliferation, being placed in charge of U.S. diplomacy related to the Nuclear Non-Proliferation Treaty (NPT) and heading the United States delegations to the 2007 and 2008 NPT Preparatory Committee meetings. In August 2008, Ford left the Executive Branch to become a Senior Fellow at the Hudson Institute, a Washington, DC think tank founded in 1961 by nuclear strategist Herman Kahn. In March 2013, Ford became Republican Chief Counsel for the U.S. Senate Committee on Appropriations, and moved to become Senior Counsel for National Security Policy at the U.S. Senate Committee on Banking, Housing, and Urban Affairs after the Republicans won the Senate majority in the 2014 midterm elections; he subsequently became that committee's Chief Investigative Counsel. In late 2015, he became Chief Legislative Counsel for the U.S. Senate Committee on Foreign Relations under its chairman, the Republican Senator Bob Corker of Tennessee.

=== Donald Trump administration ===
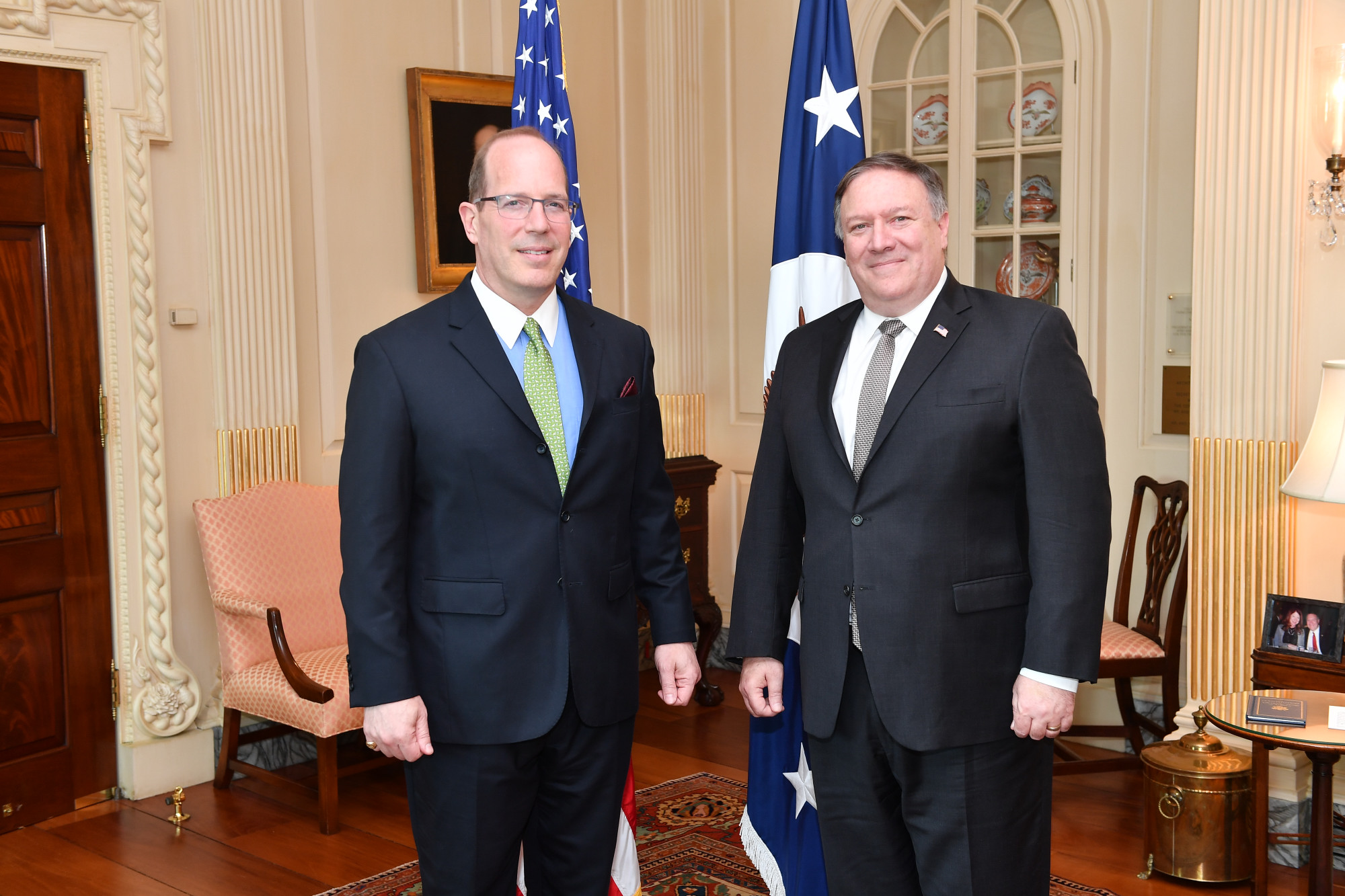
Ford poses with Secretary of State Mike Pompeo after being sworn in as Assistant Secretary of State for International Security and Nonproliferation at the U.S. Department of State on August 20, 2018.

He joined the United States National Security Council staff in January 2017. He was nominated for his current position on November 2, 2017, favorably reported by the United States Senate Committee on Foreign Relations on December 5, 2017, confirmed by the Senate by voice vote on December 21, 2017, and took office in January 2018.

According to reporting of Vanity Fair, Thomas DiNanno accused Ford and his team, in a state department memo from January 9, 2021, of obstructing his efforts to investigate the lab leak theory and warning not to investigate the origins of COVID-19 for fear of opening a "can of worms".

In January 2021, a day after the storming of the U.S. Capitol by a pro-Trump mob, Ford sent a letter to his staff announcing his resignation "a week from tomorrow." The letter was cheery, did not mention the storming of the Capitol, and said serving in the position had been the "highlight of my professional career." Shortly thereafter, Ford revised the letter to say he was resigning immediately, saying he was unable to "serve in an administration at a time in which some are willing to condone, or even to incite, violent insurrection against the country I hold dear and whose Constitution I have taken a sacred oath to support and defend."

== Publications ==
Ford has written three books. Ford has written numerous articles and papers on subjects including nonproliferation and arms control law and policy, international law, nuclear disarmament, nuclear weapons policy, Chinese strategic culture, counter-terrorism, intelligence issues, and comparative law, and he speaks frequently at professional conferences around the world. With the Israeli scholar Amichai Cohen, he also edited a book assessing international and domestic legal issues related to counter-terrorism a decade after the terrorist attacks of September 11, 2001.

He is a member of Chatham House, the International Institute for Strategic Studies, and the Council on Foreign Relations.
