= Vann Van Diepen =

American government official

Vann H. Van Diepen

Assistant Secretary of State for International Security and Nonproliferation (acting)
- In office June 15, 2009 – September 26, 2011
- Preceded by: C.S. Eliot Kang
- Succeeded by: Thomas M. Countryman

Vann Van Diepen is a former United States civil servant who worked in a variety of positions in the United States Department of State.

Van Diepen received a B.A. degree in international studies from American University and a S.M. degree from the Massachusetts Institute of Technology. He began his career in the Bureau of Intelligence and Research as a Soviet military analyst, and later held positions managing chemical and biological weapons nonproliferation initiatives, and ballistic missile threat reduction programs, for the U.S. State Department. In 2006 he moved to the Office of the Director of National Intelligence, returning to the State Department in 2009 as Principal Deputy Assistant Secretary of State for International Security and Nonproliferation.

Van Diepen was a major contributor to a 2007 National Intelligence Estimate (NIE) on the nuclear weapons program of Iran, which some said underestimated Iranian nuclear capabilities and which was criticized by neoconservatives as being politicized and reflective of former U.S. Secretary of State Colin Powell's preference for negotiation over confrontation with Iran over nuclear issues. The charges of politicization against Van Diepen and the other report authors were rejected by Vice President of the United States Dick Cheney and by Flynt Leverett.

Until late 2011, Van Diepen spent two years as acting Assistant Secretary of State for International Security and Non-Proliferation, but was never nominated to the post on a permanent basis due to doubts by the Obama presidency as to whether the United States Senate would confirm his appointment owing to continuing concerns by some Republican senators over the 2007 NIE. While acting as Assistant Secretary of State he confronted Ukrainian officials over allegations they had been supplying South Sudan with T-72 main battle tanks which, according to diplomatic cables, led to a "commotion on the Ukrainian side".

In 2016 Van Diepen was decorated with the Presidential Rank Award of Distinguished Senior Professional. He retired from the State Department in December 2016.
