= Thomas M. Countryman =

American diplomat (born 1957)

Tom Countryman
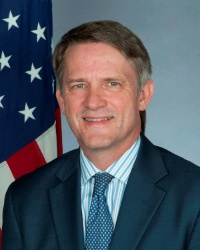

Under Secretary of State for International Security Affairs Acting
- In office October 12, 2016 – January 27, 2017
- President: Barack Obama; Donald Trump
- Preceded by: Rose Gottemoeller
- Succeeded by: Andrea L. Thompson

2nd Assistant Secretary of State for International Security and Nonproliferation
- In office September 27, 2011 – January 27, 2017
- President: Barack Obama; Donald Trump
- Preceded by: John Rood (2007)
- Succeeded by: Christopher Ashley Ford

Personal details
- Born: 1957 (age 68–69)
- Education: Washington University in St. Louis (BA); Harvard University

Thomas M. Countryman (born 1957) is a career diplomat who served as United States Assistant Secretary of State for International Security and Nonproliferation from September 27, 2011 to January 27, 2017.

== Biography ==
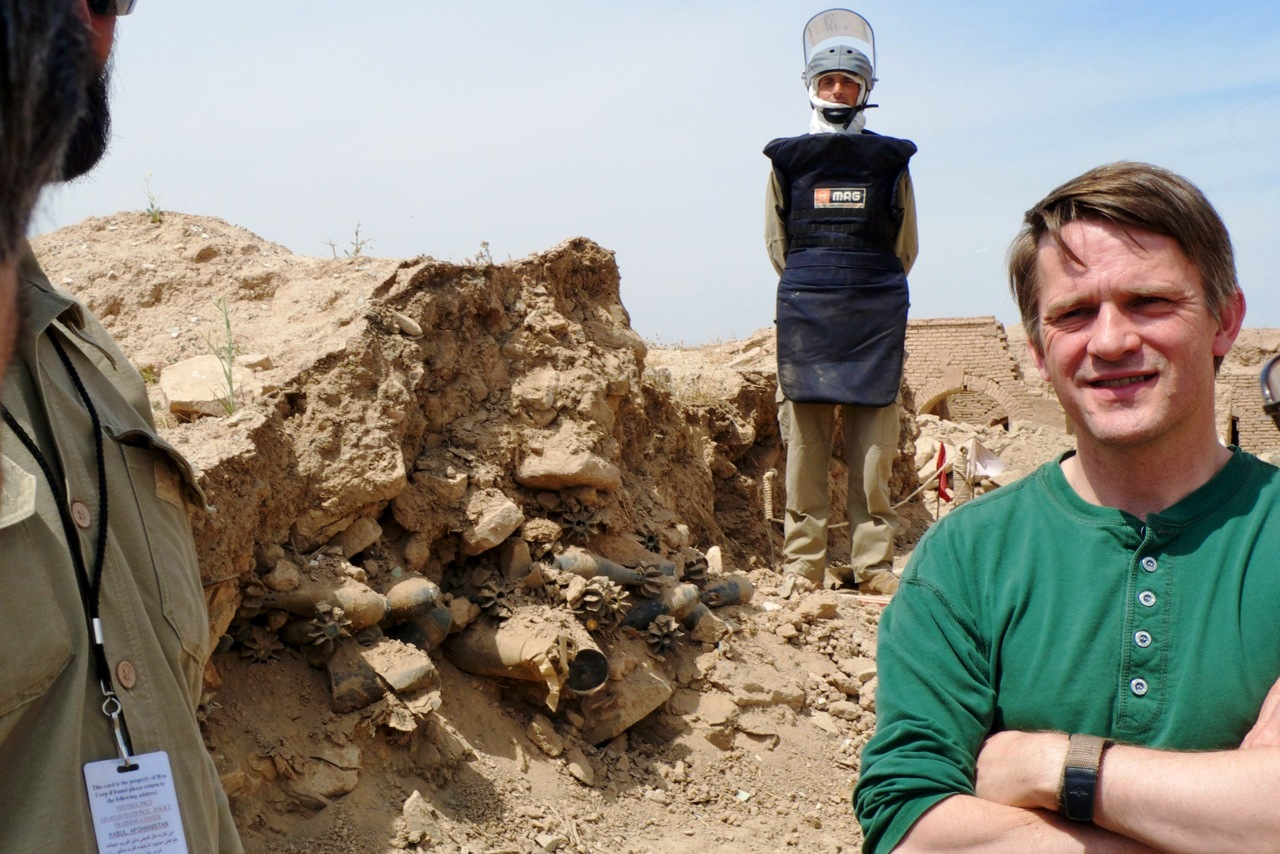
Countryman removes landmines in Afghanistan, 2010

Thomas M. Countryman is a graduate of Bellarmine Preparatory School, in Tacoma, Washington, and of Washington University in St. Louis, and studied at the John F. Kennedy School of Government.

He joined the United States Department of State in 1982. From 1983 to 1985, he was posted at the U.S. embassy in Belgrade, Yugoslavia. He worked in the Department's Office of Eastern European and Yugoslav Affairs 1985–88.

He spent 1988 through 1990 studying the Arabic language and Arab culture in the U.S. and Tunisia. He was posted to the U.S. embassy in Cairo during Operation Desert Shield and Operation Desert Storm. From 1991 to 1993, he was the senior officer for reporting on political, security, and religious affairs within Egypt.

He spent 1993–94 in the Office of Counterterrorism. From 1994 to 1997 he was the special advisor to United States Ambassador to the United Nations Madeleine Albright on Middle East affairs and was the U.S. liaison to the United Nations Special Commission.

He was at the United States National Security Council 1997-98 as Director for Near East and South Asian Affairs with responsibility for the region stretching from Morocco to Syria. In this capacity, he was the White House liaison with the staff of Ambassador Dennis Ross.

He spent 1998-99 working at the Senior Seminar. In 1999 through 2000, he was Director of the State Department's Office of South Central European Affairs. He was posted at the Embassy of the United States, Rome from 2001 through 2005 as Minister-Counselor for Political Affairs. He was then briefly Director of the State Department's Office of United Nations Political Affairs.

He was Deputy Chief of Mission of the Embassy of the United States, Athens from 2005 to 2008, serving as chargé d'affaires for 5 months in 2007. He was then the Foreign Policy Advisor of General James T. Conway, Commandant of the Marine Corps, from 2008 to 2009.

In 2009–10, he was the State Department's Principal Deputy Assistant Secretary for Political-Military Affairs, and in 2010-11 Deputy Assistant Secretary for European Affairs with responsibility for Balkan affairs.

In 2011, President of the United States Barack Obama nominated him to be Assistant Secretary of State for International Security and Nonproliferation and, after senate confirmation, he was sworn in as Assistant Secretary on September 27, 2011.

He is fluent in Serbo-Croatian, Arabic, Italian, Greek, and German.

On January 27, 2017, while on his way to a conference on arms control, he was relieved of his duties by President Donald Trump.

He joined the board of directors of the nonpartisan Washington-based Arms Control Association in June 2017, and was elected chair the following October.

Government offices
Preceded by Vann Van Diepen; Acting	Assistant Secretary of State for International Security and Nonproliferation; 2011–2017	Succeeded by C.S. Eliot Kang; Acting
Preceded by Rose Gottemoeller	Under Secretary of State for Arms Control and International Security; Acting; 2016–2017	Vacant Title next held by Andrea L. Thompson; 2018
