= A Better Chance =

Non-profit organisation in the USA

- Formation: 1963
- Founder: Developed through the National Scholarship Service and Fund for Negro Students
- Type: Non-profit organization
- Purpose: Helping young people of color to attend high-achieving schools in the United States
- Region served: United States
- Website: https://www.abetterchance.org/

A Better Chance (ABC) is a non-profit organization with the goal of helping more talented young people of color to become well-educated by attending high-achieving boarding, day, and public schools in the United States. ABC was founded in 1963 and is headquartered in New York, New York, with regional offices around the United States. The organization works towards having a great number of young people of color assume roles of leadership in the United States.

== History ==
A Better Chance was a development of the National Scholarship Service and Fund for Negro Students (NSSFNS). NSSFNS was an organization that referred black students to college and private boarding schools. In 1962, NSSFNS phased out referring students to private boarding school. However, the director of NSSFNS set up a meeting with 23 headmasters from the New England area to reestablish the program. They discussed the link between poverty and lack of education. Richard Plaut, Director of the National Scholarship and Service Fund for Negro Students, and John M. Kemper, Headmaster of Phillips Academy, came to the conclusion that broadening educational opportunities for minorities would lead to them living better lives. In 1964, fifty-five boys were given the chance to attend a prep school contingent on the plan they complete an intensive eight-week summer school program at Dartmouth College. This program was to be called A Better Chance (ABC) and from this its two basic components were derived. The first component is to identify students and refer them to member schools. The second component is a summer program to serve as a transition to boarding school. The program was run by the Independent Schools Talent Search Program (ISTSP) which separated from NSSFNS to become its own non-profit charitable trust in 1964. The first sources of administrative funding were dues from member schools and a grant awarded by the Merrill Trust. In 1972, ISTSP merged with Public School Programs to form A Better Chance, Inc.

== Goal ==
Originally, A Better Chance wanted to integrate students of color into higher education in order for them to achieve better lives. At the time of its founding colleges had minority enrollments of less than one percent. Currently, A Better Chance states its goal is working towards having a greater number of young people of color assume roles of leadership in the United States. 43 of the 503 most powerful people in US in culture, government, business and more are people of color. In order to change that the organization wants to create a self-sustaining pipeline of diverse leaders. Additionally, the organization would like to close the gap in academic achievement based on race and allow students of color to realize their full potential. The organization carries out its goal by annually recruiting, referring and supporting 500 scholars at more than 300 member schools in 29 states.

It has reported more than 16,000 alumni who have gone into careers as physicians, artists, educators, lawyers, politicians, and corporate executives. The number of A Better Chance alumni attending college after high school is more than 96% compared to 24% of students of color nationwide.

== Admission ==
In order to apply to ABC, the student must be a citizen or permanent resident of United States, identify as a person of color, and be in grades 4-9. Applicants must submit an income form, school history, an essay, transcripts, benchmark testing scores, recommendations and be interviewed. The schools affiliated with A Better Chance may require additional standardized testing or interviews. The applicant may get accepted to ABC but not to a member school. Financial aid is provided by the member schools and the size of the package depends on the financial situation of the applicant. The organization looks for students who participate in extracurricular activities and demonstrate leadership potential.

Admission Statistics
	2015	2016	2017	2018	2019
Applicants	1774	2883	2073	2080	2003
Students Referred	727	940	878	823	827
Scholars Accepted	598	645	613	621	600
Scholars Placed	466	483	453	476	471

== Notable alumni ==
- Tracy Chapman
- Roxane Gay
- Bonnie Jenkins
- Deval Patrick
- Luis Ubiñas
- Nikil Saval, Pennsylvania State Senator and writer
