= Assistant Secretary of State for International Security and Nonproliferation =

U.S. government position

United States Assistant Secretary of State for International Security and Nonproliferation
- Seal of the United States Department of State

- Flag of an Assistant Secretary of State

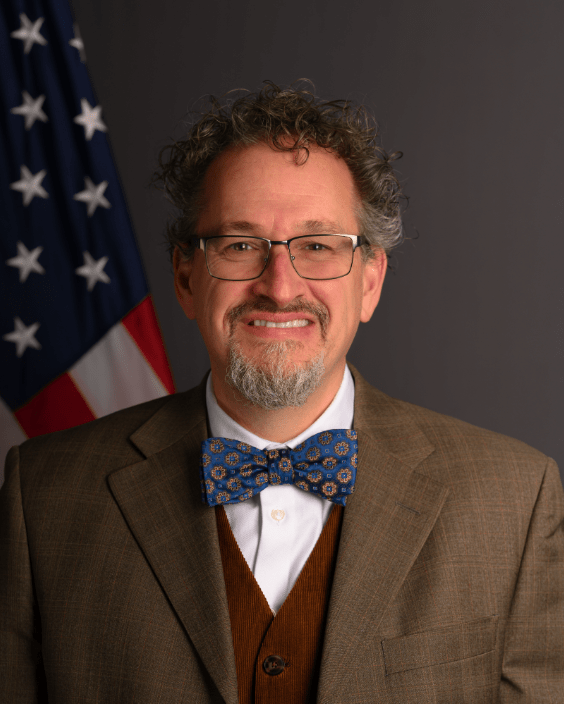
- Incumbent; Christopher Yeaw since December 30, 2025
- Reports to: Under Secretary of State for Arms Control and International Security
- Nominator: President of the United States
- Inaugural holder: Stephen Rademaker (acting)
- Formation: 2005
- Website: www.state.gov/t/isn/index.htm

The assistant secretary of state for international security and nonproliferation is the head of the Bureau of International Security and Nonproliferation, which is responsible for managing the nonproliferation, counter-proliferation functions of the United States Department of State. The position was created on September 13, 2005, when the Bureau of Arms Control and the Bureau of Nonproliferation were merged. The Assistant Secretary of State for International Security and Nonproliferation reports to the Under Secretary of State for Arms Control and International Security Affairs.

Stephen Rademaker was the first Acting Assistant Secretary of State for International Security and Nonproliferation. He had been the Assistant Secretary for the Bureau of Arms Control, and in February 2005 he was named the head of the Bureau for Nonproliferation pending the two bureaus' merger.

== Assistant Secretaries of State for International Security and Nonproliferation ==
#	Name	Assumed office	Left office	President(s) served under
-	Stephen G. Rademaker (acting)	September 13, 2005	May 20, 2006	George W. Bush
-	Francis C. Record (acting)	May 21, 2006	October 1, 2006	George W. Bush
1	John Rood	October 2, 2006	September 27, 2007	George W. Bush
-	Patricia A. McNerney (acting)	September 28, 2007	January 20, 2009	George W. Bush
-	C.S. Eliot Kang (acting)	January 20, 2009	June 15, 2009	George W. Bush; Barack Obama
-	Vann Van Diepen (acting)	June 15, 2009	September 26, 2011	Barack Obama
2	Thomas M. Countryman	September 27, 2011	January 27, 2017	Barack Obama; Donald Trump
-	C.S. Eliot Kang (acting)	January 27, 2017	January 8, 2018	Donald Trump
3	Christopher Ashley Ford	January 9, 2018	January 8, 2021	Donald Trump
-	C.S. Eliot Kang (acting)	January 8, 2021	March 31, 2022	Donald Trump; Joe Biden
4	C.S. Eliot Kang	March 31, 2022	January 20, 2025	Joe Biden
-	Ann K. Ganzer (acting)	January 20, 2025	March 7, 2025	Donald Trump
-	Paul Watzlavick (Senior Bureau Official)	March 7, 2025	December 30, 2025	Donald Trump
5	Christopher Yeaw	December 30, 2025	Present	Donald Trump
