= Under Secretary of State for Arms Control and International Security =

U.S. government position

United States Under Secretary of State for Arms Control and International Security
- Seal of the United States Department of State

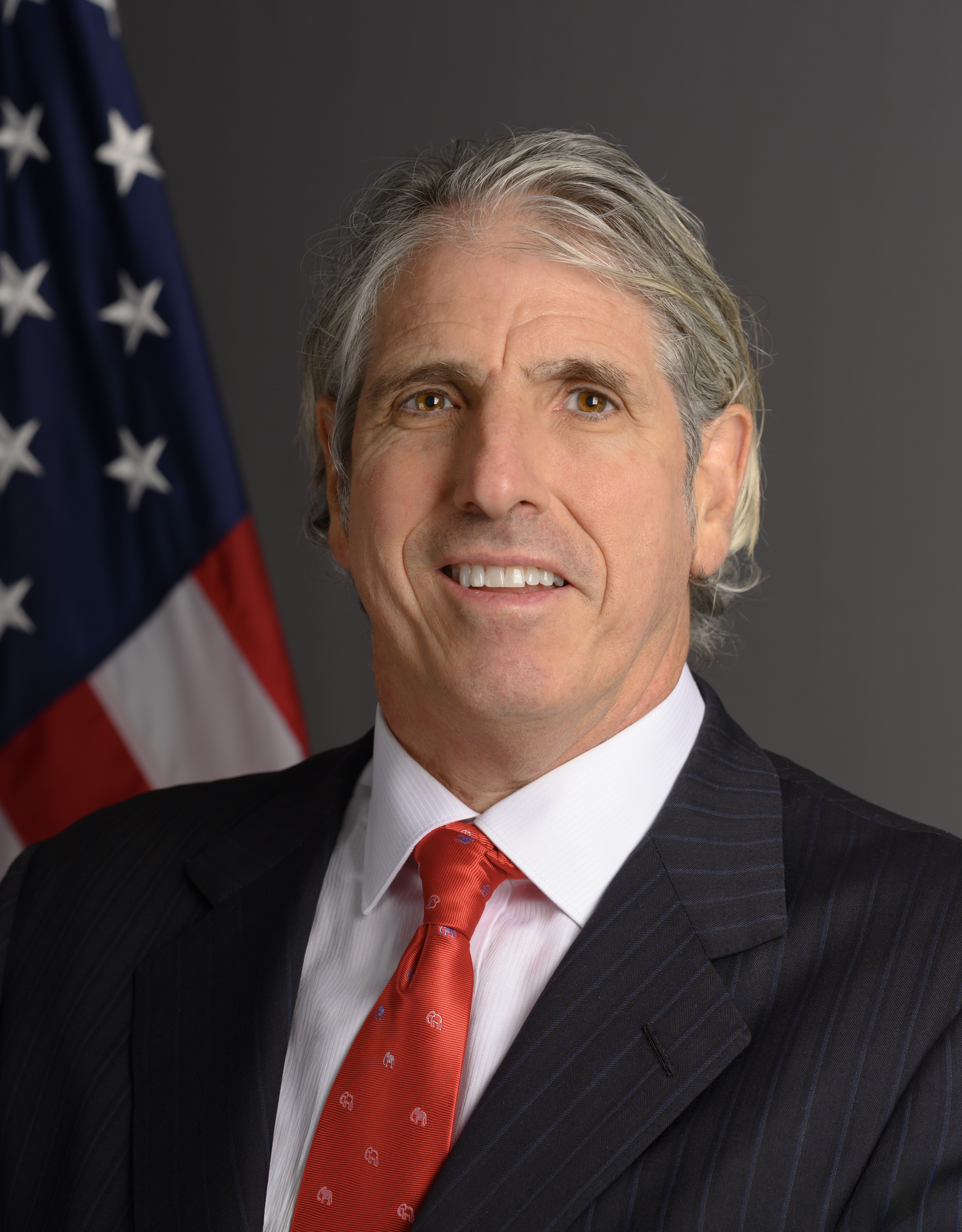
- Incumbent; Thomas G. DiNanno since October 10, 2025
- Department of State
- Reports to: The U.S. secretary of state
- Seat: Washington, D.C.
- Appointer: The president; with Senate advice and consent
- Term length: No fixed term
- Inaugural holder: Curtis W. Tarr
- Formation: 1972
- Salary: Executive Schedule, Level 3
- Website: state.gov/t

The under secretary of state for arms control and international security (T) is a political appointee within the U.S. Department of State who serves as a senior adviser to the president and the secretary of state for arms control, nonproliferation, and disarmament.

In this capacity, the under secretary attends and participates, at the direction of the president, in National Security Council (NSC) and subordinate meetings pertaining to arms control, nonproliferation, and disarmament and has the right to communicate, through the secretary of state, with the president and members of the NSC on arms control, nonproliferation, and disarmament concerns.

The under secretary also leads the interagency policy process on nonproliferation and manages global U.S. security policy, principally in the areas of nonproliferation, arms control, regional security and defense relations, and arms transfers and security assistance. The under secretary provides policy direction in the following areas: nonproliferation, including the missile and nuclear areas, as well as chemical, biological, and conventional weapons proliferation; arms control, including negotiation, ratification, verification and compliance, and implementation of agreements on strategic, non-conventional, and conventional forces; regional security and defense relations, involving policy regarding U.S. security commitments worldwide as well as on the use of U.S. military forces in unilateral or international peacekeeping roles; and arms transfers and security assistance programs and arms transfer policies.

By delegation from the secretary, the under secretary performs a range of functions under the Foreign Assistance Act, Arms Export Control Act, and related legislation. The bureaus of Counterterrorism, Political-Military Affairs, International Narcotics and Law Enforcement Affairs, Bureau of Emerging Threats and Arms Control and Nonproliferation are under the policy oversight of the Under Secretary for Arms Control and International Security. The assistant secretary of state for arms control and nonproliferation, the coordinator for counterterrorism, assistant secretary of state for international narcotics and law enforcement affairs, assistant secretary of state for Emerging Threats and the assistant secretary for political-military affairs all report to the under secretary for arms control and international security.

According to the Office of the Historian of the U.S. Department of State, the under secretary first received the permanent title "Senior Adviser to the President and the Secretary of State for Arms Control, Nonproliferation and Disarmament" when the Clinton administration decided to merge the Arms Control and Disarmament Agency and the United States Information Agency into the State Department, as well as realigning the United States Agency for International Development with it.

== List of under secretaries of state ==
=== International security affairs, 1972–1993 ===
#	Name	Assumed office	Left office	President served under
1	Curtis W. Tarr	May 2, 1972	November 25, 1973	Richard Nixon
2	William H. Donaldson	November 26, 1973	May 10, 1974	Richard Nixon
3	Carlyle E. Maw	July 10, 1974	September 17, 1976	Gerald Ford
4	Lucy W. Benson	March 28, 1977	January 5, 1980	Jimmy Carter
5	Matthew Nimetz	February 21, 1980	December 5, 1980	Jimmy Carter
6	James L. Buckley	February 28, 1981	August 20, 1982	Ronald Reagan
7	William Schneider Jr.	September 9, 1982	October 31, 1986	Ronald Reagan
8	Ed Derwinski	March 24, 1987	January 21, 1989	Ronald Reagan
9	Reginald Bartholomew	April 20, 1989	July 7, 1992	George H. W. Bush
10	Frank G. Wisner	July 20, 1992	January 19, 1993	George H. W. Bush

=== Arms control and international security, 1993–present ===
#	Name	Assumed office	Left office	President served under
11	Lynn Etheridge Davis	April 1, 1993	August 8, 1997	Bill Clinton
12	John D. Holum	December 1, 1997	August 7, 2000	Bill Clinton
13	John R. Bolton	May 11, 2001	July 31, 2005	George W. Bush
14	Robert Joseph	June 1, 2005	March 2, 2007	George W. Bush
-	John Rood (acting)	September 26, 2007	January 20, 2009	George W. Bush
15	Ellen Tauscher	June 26, 2009	February 7, 2012	Barack Obama
16	Rose Gottemoeller	February 7, 2012; Acting: February 7–March 7, 2014	October 12, 2016	Barack Obama
-	Thomas M. Countryman (acting)	October 12, 2016	January 27, 2017	Barack Obama/Donald Trump
-	C.S. Eliot Kang (acting)	January 27, 2017	January 9, 2018	Donald Trump
-	Christopher Ashley Ford (acting)	January 9, 2018	April 30, 2018	Donald Trump
17	Andrea L. Thompson	April 30, 2018	October 20, 2019	Donald Trump
-	Christopher Ashley Ford (acting)	October 21, 2019	January 8, 2021	Donald Trump
-	Marshall Billingslea (acting)	January 11, 2021	January 20, 2021	Donald Trump
-	C.S. Eliot Kang (as Senior Official)	January 20, 2021	July 21, 2021	Joe Biden
18	Bonnie Jenkins	July 22, 2021	December 31, 2024	Joe Biden
-	C.S. Eliot Kang (acting)	January 1, 2025	January 20, 2025	Joe Biden
-	Brent T. Christensen (as Senior Official)	January 20, 2025	October 10, 2025	Donald Trump
19	Thomas DiNanno	October 10, 2025	Incumbent	Donald Trump
