= Jayne Harkins =

American civil servant

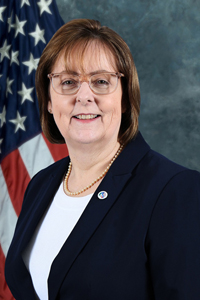
Jayne Harkins was appointed U.S. Commissioner of the International Boundary and Water Commission, United States and Mexico, by President Donald J. Trump in 2018.

Jayne Harkins is the first woman to have served as the U.S. Commissioner of the International Boundary and Water Commission (IBWC) for either the United States or Mexico in the commission's 129-year history. She was appointed by Donald Trump.

== Biography ==
Harkins has a Bachelor of Science in Geological Engineering from the University of North Dakota and a Masters in Public Administration from the University of Nevada, Las Vegas.

== Career ==
Much of Harkins’ career has been spent working on issues associated with the Colorado River working for both the U.S. Bureau of Reclamation as Deputy Regional Director and Colorado River Commission of Nevada (executive director from 2011 until 2018).
