= Howard J. Wiarda =

American academic

Howard J. Wiarda,
- Born: November 30th, 1939; Grosse Pointe, Michigan, U.S.
- Died: September 12, 2015 (aged 75); Athens, Georgia
- Education: University of Michigan (BA); University of Florida (MA, PhD); National War College (MS)
- Occupation(s): Professor, historian, writer
- Spouse: Ieda Wiarda
- Children: 3

Howard J. Wiarda (1939 – 2015) was an American academic who was the Dean Rusk Professor of International Relations and Founding Head of the Department of International Affairs at the University of Georgia. He also served in two think tanks in Washington, DC.

Wiarda was considered a major figure in the study of comparative politics and foreign policy. He published extensively on Latin America, Iberia, International Relations, Development Policy, the Third World, Asia, Russia and Eastern Europe, and United States Foreign Policy.

== Early life ==
Howard J Wiarda was born in Grosse Pointe, Michigan, grew up in Grand Rapids, and was in the honors program at the University of Michigan where he received his BA degree. He earned M.A. and Ph.D. degrees at the University of Florida. He also earned a Master of Science at the National War College in 1993.

Wiarda married Dr. Iêda de Barros Siqueira, February 4, 1964. She was a Brazilian American Research Specialist at the Library of Congress and Professor of Political Science at the University of Georgia. The couple had three children, Jon Wiarda, Howard Wiarda, and Kristy Williams.

== Academic career ==
- Dean Rusk Professor of International Relations and Founding Head of the Department of International Affairs at the University of Georgia.
- Senior Associate at the Center for Strategic and International Studies (CSIS)
- Senior Scholar at the Woodrow Wilson International Center for Scholars in Washington, D.C.

== Honors, decorations, awards and distinctions ==
- Honorary doctorate and Honorary Professor at Nizhny Novgorod State University, Russia
- Order of Christopher Columbus, by President Leonel Fernández, the highest honor that the Dominican Republic government can bestow. President Fernández is Wiarda's former student.
- Fulbright-Hays Fellowship, 1964–65.
- Grandfather of the face of Southern Illinois rap, DSG Jack (Adopted son of Howard's son, Jon)

== Published works ==
- Wiarda, Howard (1977). Corporatism and development : the Portuguese experience. Amherst: University of Massachusetts Press. ISBN 9780870232213.
- Wiarda, Howard (1982). The Continuing Struggle For Democracy In Latin America. Boulder, CO: Westview Press. ISBN 978-0891586630.
- Wiarda, Howard (1987). Latin America At The Crossroads: Debt, Development, And The Future. Abingdon, United Kingdom: Routledge. ISBN 978-0367006792.
- Wiarda, Howard (1992). Politics And Social Change In Latin America: Still A Distinct Tradition? Third Edition. Boulder, CO: Westview Press. ISBN 978-0813310572.
- Wiarda, Howard (1993). Politics in Iberia : the political systems of Spain and Portugal. New York, NY: HarperCollins College Publishers. ISBN 978-0673464323.
- Wiarda, Howard (1997). Corporatism and comparative politics : the other great "ism. Armonk, NY: M.E. Sharpe. ISBN 978-1563247163.
- Wiarda, Howard (1999). Non-Western Theories of Development. Orlando, FL: Harcourt Brace College. ISBN 0-15-505366-3.
- Wiarda, Howard (2000). Introduction to comparative politics : concepts and processes. Fort Worth: Harcourt College Publishers. ISBN 978-0155078697.
- Wiarda, Howard; Margaret MacLeish Mott, Margaret (2001). Catholic roots and democratic flowers : political systems in Spain and Portugal. Westport, Conn: Praeger. ISBN 9780275970185.
- Wiarda, Howard (2006). Development on the periphery : democratic transitions in Southern and Eastern Europe. Lanham, Md: Rowman & Littlefield. ISBN 978-0742530331.
- Wiarda, Howard (2011). Military brass vs. civilian academics at the National War College : a clash of cultures. Lanham, Md: Lexington Books. ISBN 978-0739150856.
- Wiarda, Howard (2020). Corporatism And National Development In Latin America. Abingdon, United Kingdom: Routledge. ISBN 978-0367018511.
