= Thomas G. DiNanno =

Under Secretary of State for Arms Control since 2026

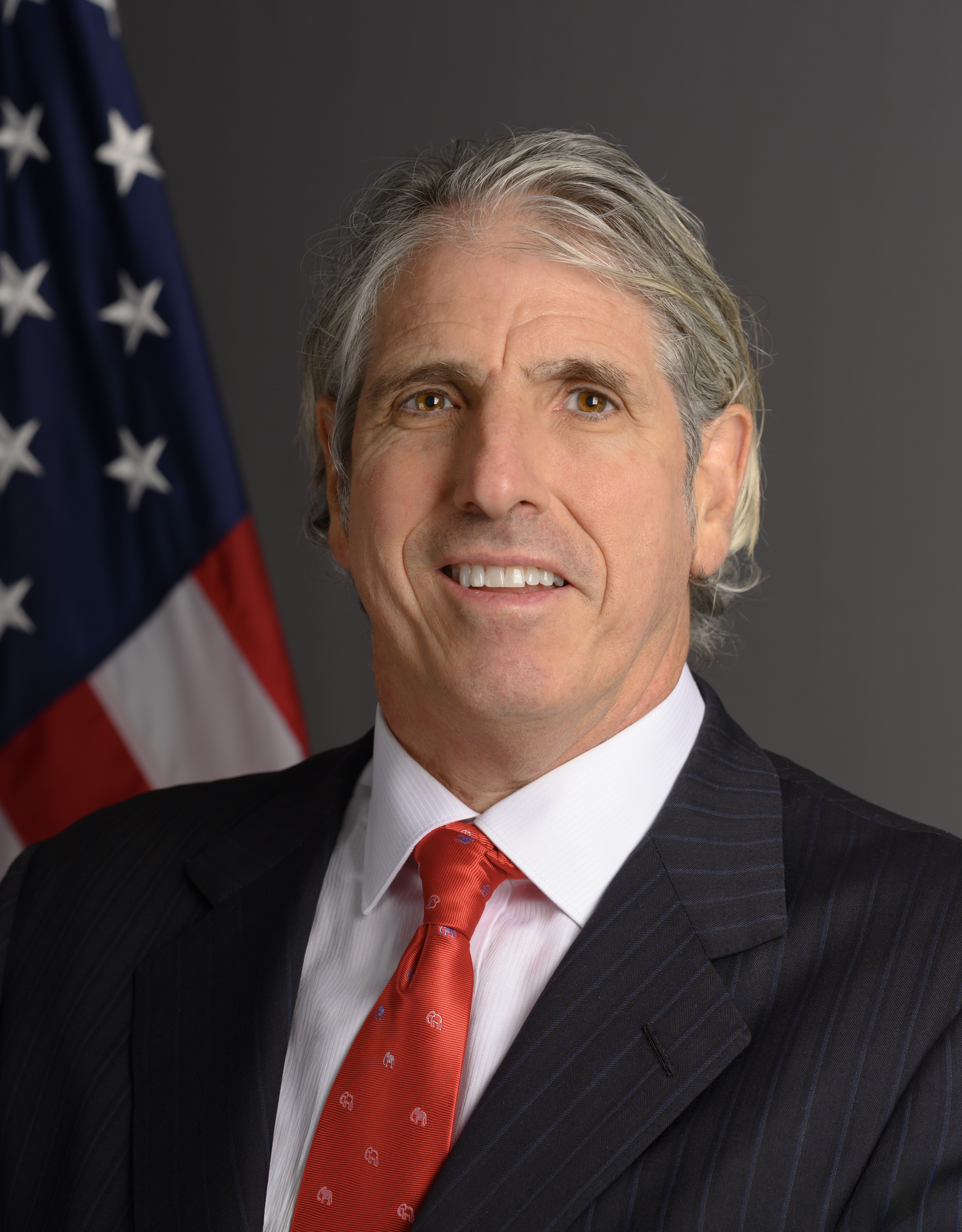

Under Secretary of State for Arms Control and International Security
- Incumbent
- Assumed office October 10, 2025
- President: Donald Trump
- Secretary: Marco Rubio
- Preceded by: Bonnie Jenkins

Personal details
- Education: Middlebury College; Massachusetts Institute of Technology; University of Pennsylvania; Fletcher School of Law and Diplomacy

Thomas G. DiNanno is an American public servant and petrochemical consultant. Since 2025 he has served as the U.S. Under Secretary of State for Arms Control and International Security.

== Early life and education ==
Dinanno received his Bachelor of Arts degree from Middlebury College in 1989. He also holds master's degrees from the University of Pennsylvania and Massachusetts Institute of Technology.

== Career ==
=== Bush administration ===
From February to October 2001, DiNanno worked as a senior advisor at the U.S. Small Business Administration. In November 2001, two months after the 9/11 terrorist attacks, he joined the White House Office of Homeland Security as director of corporate relations.

In March 2003, DiNanno was named Deputy Assistant Secretary for Infrastructure Protection at the U.S. Department of Homeland Security; he remained in that role until 2007.

=== First Trump administration ===
DiNanno served as Deputy Assistant Secretary of State for Defense Policy, Emerging Threats, and Outreach in the Arms Control, Verification and Compliance Bureau beginning October 1, 2018 and became Senior Bureau Official June 8, 2019 through the end of the first Trump Administration.

=== Second Trump administration ===
In 2025, following the State Department's reorganization under Secretary Marco Rubio, DiNanno was nominated to be the first Under Secretary of State for Arms Control and International Security, overseeing the "T" undersecretariat. He was confirmed by the Senate on a party-line vote on October 7, 2025.

In February 2026, DiNanno made a speech in Geneva in which he accused China of secret nuclear testing. DiNanno used the speech to recast the United States from a decades-long leader of nuclear restraint, centered on testing moratoria, arms control, and nonproliferation, into a more openly competitive nuclear power willing to challenge the existing global nuclear framework in response to China and Russia.
