= Stephen Rademaker =

American lawyer

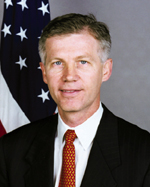

Assistant Secretary of State for International Security and Nonproliferation
- In office September 13, 2005 – May 20, 2006
- President: George W. Bush
- Preceded by: Position established
- Succeeded by: Francis C. Record

Personal details
- Born: Stephen Geoffrey Rademaker; 1959 (age 66–67)
- Spouse: Danielle Pletka
- Education: University of Virginia (BA, JD, MA)

Stephen Geoffrey Rademaker (born 1959) is an attorney, lobbyist, and former Bush administration government official. He was chief counsel to the United States House Committee on Homeland Security of the House of Representatives, and an Assistant Secretary of State from 2002 through 2006.

== Education ==
Rademaker attended the University of Virginia where he received a B.A. (1981) in Foreign Affairs, a J.D. (1984), and an M.A. in Foreign Affairs (1985). He was a member of Phi Beta Kappa, the Jefferson Literary and Debating Society, and president of the Student Council during his time at the university.

== Career ==
Rademaker was an associate at the Washington, D.C. law firm of Covington & Burling 1984 to 1986, and in 1986 a law clerk to James L. Buckley of the U.S. Court of Appeals for the District of Columbia Circuit.

From 1986 to 1987, he served as counsel to the Vice Chairman of the U.S. International Trade Commission. From 1987 to 1989, Stephen served as a Special Assistant to the Assistant Secretary of State for Inter-American Affairs.

From 1989 to 1992, Rademaker held a joint appointment as Associate Counsel to the President in the Office of Counsel to the President and as Deputy Legal Adviser to the National Security Council. From 1992 to 1993, Stephen served as General Counsel of the Peace Corps. For most of the following decade, he held positions on the staff of the Committee on International Relations of the House of Representatives, including Minority Chief Counsel (1993–1995), Chief Counsel (1995–2001), and Deputy Staff Director and Chief Counsel (2001–2002). He returned briefly to the Peace Corps in 2000–2001 as the Bush-Cheney Transition's Director of Transition for the Peace Corps.

In 2002, he was Chief Counsel to the Select Committee on Homeland Security of the U.S. House of Representatives, where he was responsible for drafting the legislation that created the Department of Homeland Security. Later that year, he was confirmed by the United States Senate as the Assistant Secretary of State for International Security and Nonproliferation, serving until May 2006.

After leaving the public sector, Rademaker joined Barbour, Griffith, and Rogers in January 2007. In February 2011, Rademaker left the firm and joined the Podesta Group. In 2020 Covington & Burling listed him as senior of counsel.

== Personal life ==
Rademaker is married to Danielle Pletka, the vice president for foreign and defense policy studies at the American Enterprise Institute. Rademaker has four children.
