= Bureau of Arms Control, Verification and Compliance =

Bureau

- Seal of the United States Department of State

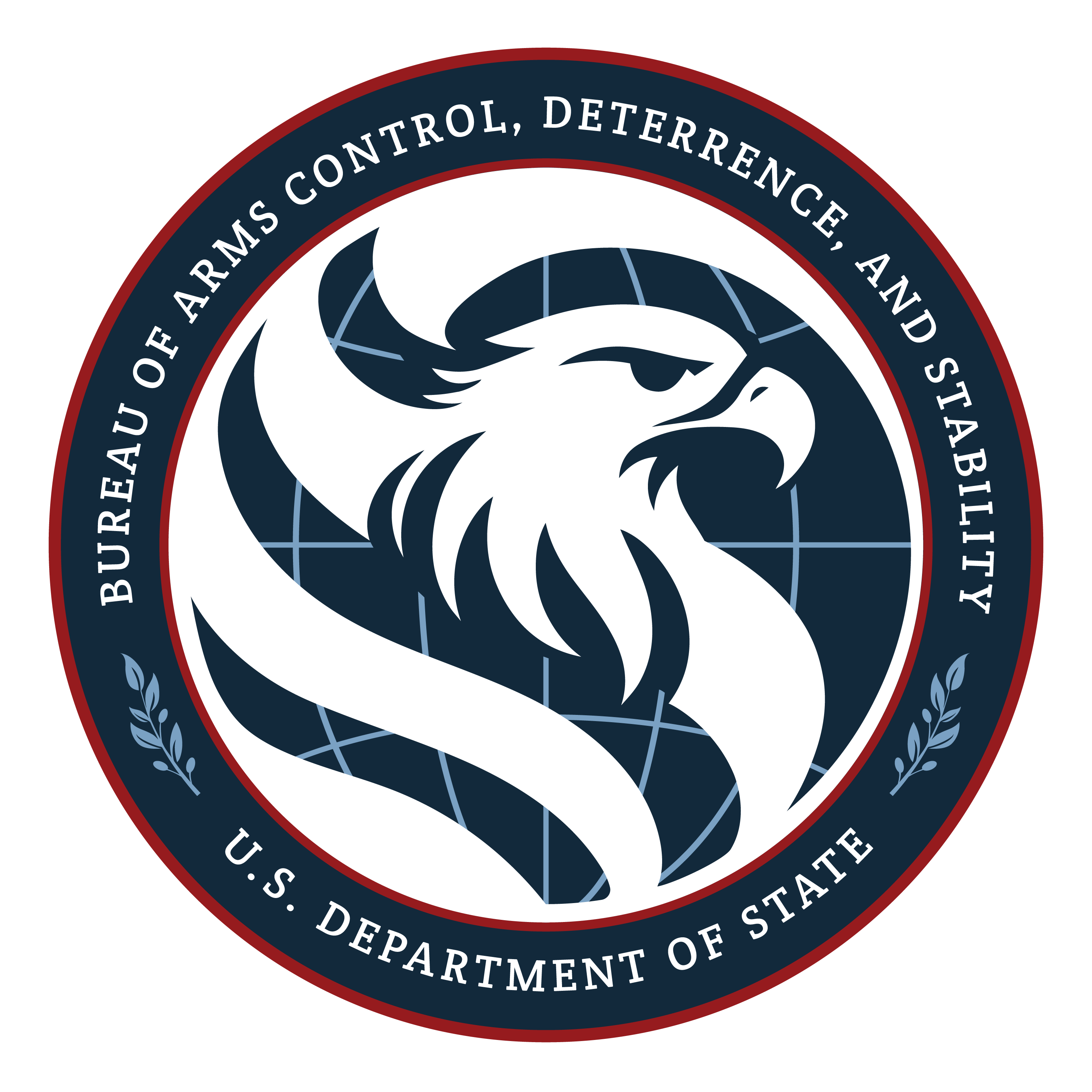
- Emblem of the Bureau of Arms Control, Deterrence, and Stability

Bureau overview
- Formed: 2010
- Preceding bureau: Bureau of Verification, Compliance and Implementation
- Dissolved: July 11, 2025
- Jurisdiction: Executive branch of the United States
- Employees: 141 (As of 2014)
- Annual budget: $31.2 million (FY 2013)
- Parent department: U.S. Department of State
- Website: state.gov/ads

The Bureau of Arms Control, Deterrence, and Stability (ADS), formerly the Bureau of Arms Control, Verification and Compliance (AVC) is a bureau within the United States Department of State. It is responsible for providing oversight of policy and resources of all matters relating to the verification of compliance or discovery of noncompliance with international arms control, nonproliferation, and disarmament agreements.

== Name Change ==
On 13 November 2023, the State Department announced the renaming of the Bureau of Arms Control, Verification and Compliance. It is now the Bureau of Arms Control, Deterrence, and Stability.

== History and Mission ==
The Bureau is headed by the assistant secretary for arms control, verification, and compliance. The Arms Control Bureau, a predecessor to the AVC Bureau, was established on April 1, 1999, by Secretary Madeleine Albright. The Bureau of Verification and Compliance was split off on February 1, 2000. Some of the functions of these two Bureaus were recombined in 2005 into the Bureau of Verification, Compliance, and Implementation. The AVC Bureau was established in a reorganization in 2009, and officially formed in 2010.

The ADS Bureau is responsible for coordinating an Annual Report on "Adherence to and Compliance with Arms Control and Nonproliferation Agreements and Commitments," a report required by statute (Section 403 of the Arms Control and Disarmament Act, as amended (22 U.S.C. 2593a)) to be annually submitted by the president to Congress. In its noncompliance assessments, the Bureau utilizes all source intelligence related to weapons of mass destruction and the proliferation behavior. The assessments are used in the process for evaluating and determining sanctionable activities.

The Bureau acts as the Department's policy liaison to the Intelligence Community for verification and compliance, providing guidance on funding and tasking priorities for collection resources. Bureau personnel participate regularly as Special Verification Advisors to, and as members of, delegations to ongoing bilateral and multilateral agreements. The Bureau co-chairs a number of Interagency Verification and Compliance Analysis Working Groups, including those related to the Biological and Toxin Weapons Convention, the Conventional Armed Forces in Europe Treaty, the Chemical Weapons Convention, the Open Skies Treaty, the Intermediate-Range Nuclear Forces Treaty, and the Strategic Arms Reduction Treaty.

The Bureau of Arms Control, Deterrence, and Stability also serves as co-chair with the intelligence community of the Verification and Monitoring Task Force to improve nuclear test detection and verifiability of nuclear related agreements. These groups provide the fora for discussion and resolution of issues arising from the implementation of treaties and commitments in-force and under negotiation, and the participation in the Department of State's sanctions groups provides further information for noncompliance assessments.
