= Andrea L. Thompson =

American government official (born 1966)

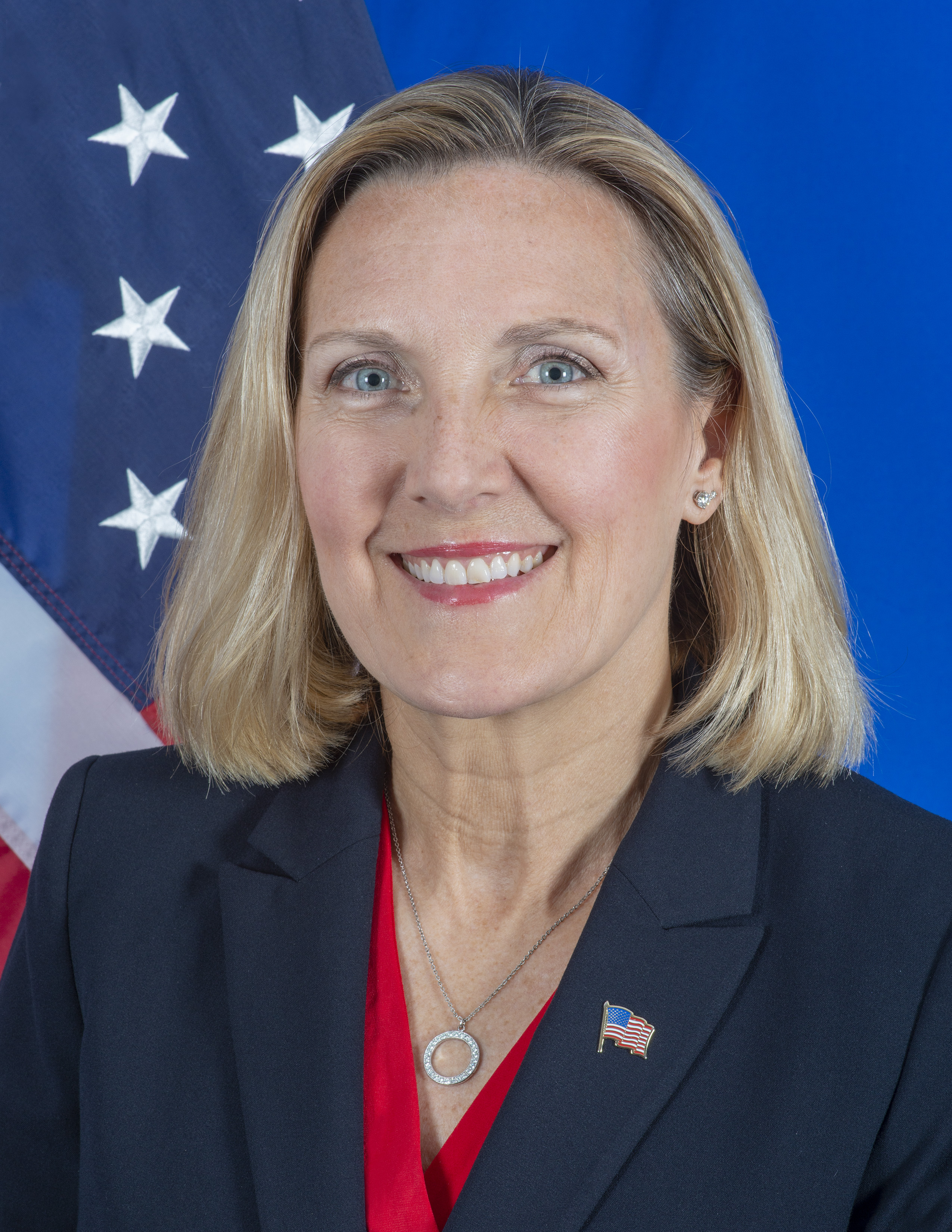

17th Under Secretary of State for Arms Control and International Security
- In office June 19, 2018 – October 20, 2019
- President: Donald Trump
- Preceded by: Rose Gottemoeller
- Succeeded by: Bonnie Jenkins

National Security Advisor to the Vice President of the United States
- In office January 26, 2017 – September 11, 2017
- Vice President: Mike Pence
- Preceded by: Colin Kahl
- Succeeded by: Keith Kellogg

Personal details
- Born: March 1, 1966 (age 60) Pierre, South Dakota, U.S.
- Education: University of South Dakota (BA); Long Island University (MS); National Defense University (MA)

Military service
- Allegiance: United States
- Branch/service: United States Army
- Years of service: 1988–2016
- Rank: Colonel
- Unit: 101st Airborne Division; 25th Infantry Division
- Commands: 902nd Military Intelligence Group

Andrea Lee Thompson (born March 1, 1966) is an American government official and former military officer. She is the former Under Secretary of State for Arms Control and International Security Affairs. Prior to this, she was the National Security Advisor to Vice President Mike Pence. Before entering government service, she was a career intelligence officer in the United States Army.

== Biography ==
=== Early life and education ===
Thompson was born on March 1, 1966, in Pierre, South Dakota to Georgia Hanson and Jim Thompson. She attended Harrisburg High School, where she graduated in 1984. She subsequently graduated from the University of South Dakota in 1988 with a Bachelor of Arts in Spanish and journalism. Thompson later earned a master of science in counseling and organizational behavior from Long Island University and, in 2009, a master of arts in national security and strategic studies from the National Defense University.

=== Military career ===
In 1988, Thompson was commissioned an intelligence officer in the United States Army. During this time, she was deployed to Afghanistan, Bosnia, Germany, Honduras, Nicaragua, Belize, and twice to Iraq. In Iraq, she was an intelligence taskforce commander until March 2004 in the 25th Infantry Division and began as the senior intelligence officer in the 101st Airborne Division in April 2005.

From June 2007 to August 2008, she served as the special assistant to General George Casey, Jr., the Chief of Staff of the Army. Afterwards, she became the intelligence chief of staff for U.S.-commanded forces in the Afghan capital of Kabul, where she served under Lt. Gen. Michael Flynn.

Thompson then served in several domestic deployments, including as brigade commander of the 902nd Military Intelligence Group from July 2010 to July 2012 at Fort Meade, and as a senior fellow with the Strategic Studies Group of the Army Chief of Staff from July 2012 to March 2013.

In March 2013, Thompson became the senior military advisor to the U.S. House of Representatives Foreign Affairs Committee, which role she held until April 2014. At that time, she was made the executive officer for Brad Carson, the Under Secretary of the Army. She held that role until July 2015, after which she became the national security advisor to the House Committee on Homeland Security in April 2015. Thompson retired after 28 years of service in the Army in August 2016, with the rank of colonel.

=== Private sector ===
After retiring from the U.S. Army, Thompson became a director of the McChrystal Group Leadership Institute, an advisory services and leadership development firm that was founded by General Stanley McChrystal, whom she served under during her deployment to Afghanistan. She held this position until January 2017.

=== White House and State Department career ===
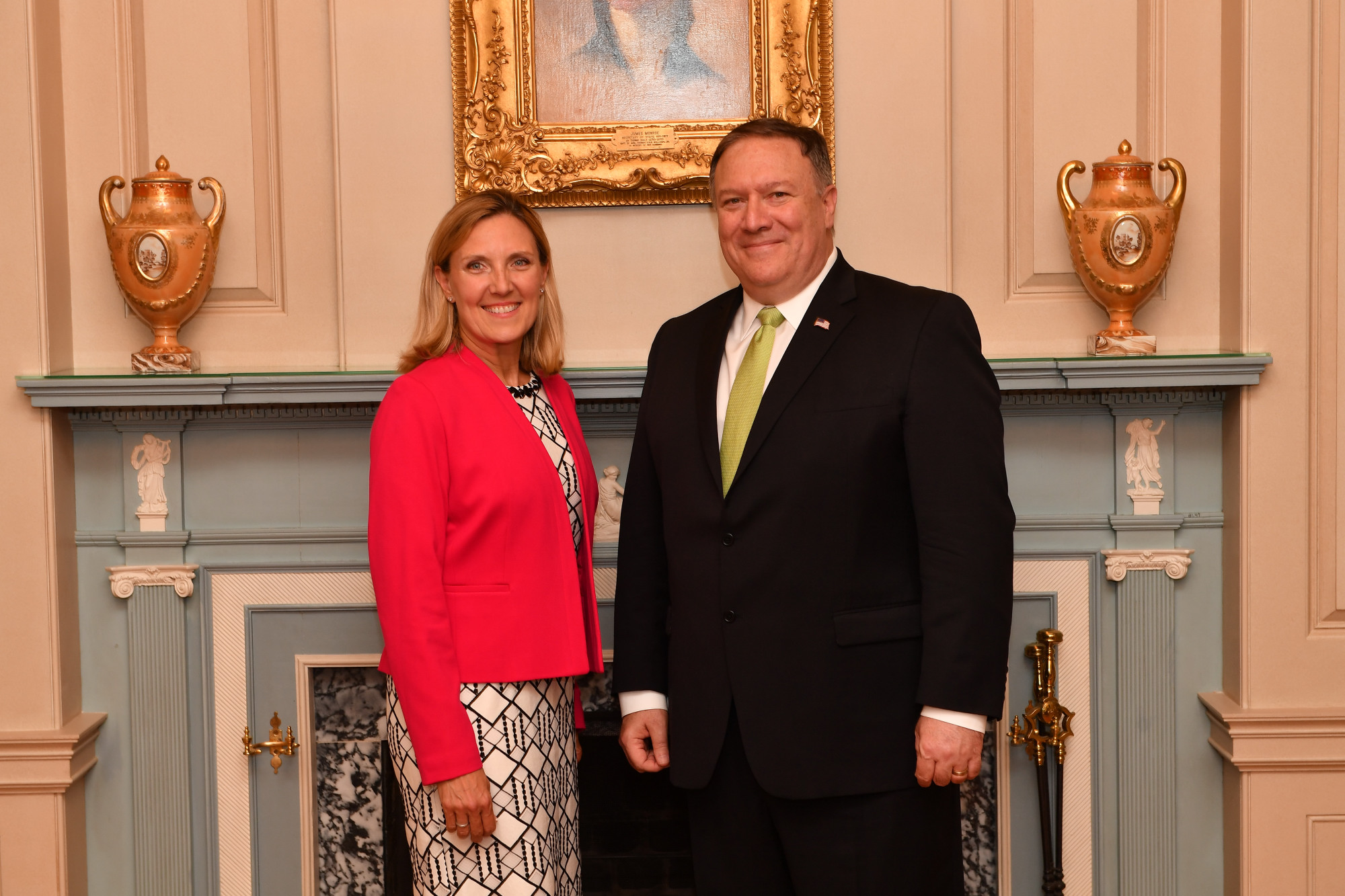
Thompson at her ceremonial swearing-in as Under Secretary with Secretary of State Mike Pompeo

Thompson was appointed the National Security Advisor to Vice President Mike Pence on January 26, 2017, officially holding the title of Deputy Assistant to the President. She succeeded Colin Kahl who was the final National Security Advisor to Vice President Joe Biden.

On December 12, 2017, the White House announced that Thompson would be nominated as the Under Secretary of State for Arms Control and International Security Affairs. She was succeeded on September 11, 2017, in her role as National Security Advisor to the Vice President by Lt. Gen. Keith Kellogg. Thompson was confirmed as Under Secretary of State by the United States Senate on April 26, 2018. She was sworn in by Secretary of State Mike Pompeo on June 19, 2018. Thompson has also co-authored a book titled Achieving Victory in Iraq: Countering an Insurgency. On September 20, 2019, Pompeo announced that Thompson would leave her position the following month.

Political offices
Preceded by Rose Gottemoeller	Under Secretary of State for Arms Control and International Security Affairs; 2018–2019	Succeeded by Bonnie Jenkins
Preceded by Colin Kahl	National Security Advisor to the Vice President of the United States; 2017	Succeeded by Keith Kellogg
