= Bureau of International Security and Nonproliferation =

U.S. State Department division

- Seal of the United States Department of State

Bureau overview
- Formed: September 13, 2005; 20 years ago
- Preceding agencies: Bureau of Nonproliferation; Bureau of Arms Control
- Superseding bureau: Bureau of Arms Control and Nonproliferation
- Jurisdiction: Executive branch of the United States
- Employees: 412 (as of 2014)
- Annual budget: $600 million (FY 2013)
- Bureau executive: Christopher Yeaw, Assistant Secretary of State for International Security and Nonproliferation
- Website: state.gov/isn

The Bureau of International Security and Nonproliferation (ISN) is a bureau within the United States Department of State responsible for managing a broad range of nonproliferation and counterproliferation functions. The bureau leads U.S. efforts to prevent the spread of weapons of mass destruction (nuclear, chemical, and biological weapons), their delivery systems, advanced conventional weapons, and related materials, technologies, and expertise.

It was created on September 13, 2005, when the Bureau of Arms Control and the Bureau of Nonproliferation were merged. Stephen G. Rademaker was the first Acting Assistant Secretary of State for International Security and Nonproliferation. He had been the Assistant Secretary for the Bureau of Arms Control, and in February 2005 he was named the head of the Bureau for Nonproliferation pending the two bureaus' merger.

== Role and responsibilities ==
The Bureau's role within the Department of State is to spearhead efforts to promote international consensus on WMD proliferation through bilateral and multilateral diplomacy. The ISN Bureau is also tasked to address WMD proliferation threats posed by non-state actors and terrorist groups by improving physical security, using interdiction and sanctions, and actively participating in the Proliferation Security Initiative.

The bureau also coordinates the implementation of international treaties and arrangements. It seeks to work with international organizations such as the United Nations, the G7, NATO, and the International Atomic Energy Agency to reduce and eliminate threats posed by weapons of mass destruction, and to support foreign partners in their efforts.

== Organization ==
In addition to the Assistant Secretary, the bureau is overseen by four Deputy Assistant Secretaries, who supervise thirteen unique offices.

Principal Deputy Assistant Secretary for International Security and Nonproliferation

- Office of Congressional and Public Affairs
- Office of Critical Technology Protection
- Office of Policy Coordination

Deputy Assistant Secretary for Nonproliferation Policy

- Biological Policy Staff
- Office of Multilateral Nuclear and Security Affairs
- Office of Nuclear Energy, Safety, and Security

Deputy Assistant Secretary for International Security Policy

- Office of Conventional Arms Threat Reduction
- Office of Counterproliferation Initiatives
- Office of Missile, Biological, and Chemical Nonproliferation

Deputy Assistant Secretary for International Security and Nonproliferation Programs

- Office of Cooperative Threat Reduction
- Office of Export Control Cooperation
- Office of Nonproliferation and Disarmament Fund
- Office of Weapons of Mass Destruction Terrorism

The bureau also includes:

- U.S. Special Representative for Nuclear Nonproliferation, who leads the U.S. delegation to the Nonproliferation Treaty.
- Special Representative for the Biological Weapons Convention
