= Neoconservatism =

Political movement of former liberals that combines political and social conservatism

Neoconservatism (colloquially neocon) is a political movement that combines features of traditional political and social conservatism with individualism and a qualified endorsement of free markets along with the assertive promotion of democracy and national interest, primarily through military means.

It began in the United States during the 1970s among liberal hawks who became disenchanted with the Democratic Party along with the growing New Left and 1960s counterculture.

Many adherents of neoconservatism became politically influential during Republican presidential administrations from the 1960s to the 2000s, peaking in influence during the presidency of George W. Bush, when they played a major role in promoting and planning the 2003 invasion of Iraq. Prominent neoconservatives in the Bush administration included Paul Wolfowitz, Elliott Abrams, Richard Perle, Paul Bremer, and Douglas Feith.

Although U.S. Vice President Dick Cheney and Secretary of Defense Donald Rumsfeld had not self-identified as neoconservatives, they worked closely alongside neoconservative officials in designing key aspects of the Bush administration's foreign policy, especially in their support for Israel, promotion of American influence in the Arab world and launching the war on terror. The Bush administration's domestic and foreign policies were heavily influenced by major ideologues affiliated with neoconservatism, such as Bernard Lewis, Lulu Schwartz, Richard and Daniel Pipes, David Horowitz, and Robert Kagan.

Critics of neoconservatism have used the term to describe foreign policy war hawks who support aggressive militarism or neocolonialism. Historically speaking, the term neoconservative refers to a group of Trotskyist academics from New York who moved from the anti-Stalinist left to conservatism during the 1960s and 1970s. The movement had its intellectual roots in the magazine Commentary, edited by Norman Podhoretz, after they spoke out against the moral relativism of the New Left, and in that way helped define the movement.

== Terminology ==
The term neoconservative was first used in an 1883 British periodical reviewing Das Kapital by Karl Marx, which called Lord Beaconsfield a Neoconservative. It was also used, in the 1940s, 1950s, and 1960s, by Dwight Macdonald and George Lichtheim. Nonetheless the term was popularized in the United States during 1973 by the socialist writer Michael Harrington, who used the term to describe Daniel Bell, Daniel Patrick Moynihan, and Irving Kristol, among others. Earlier during 1973, he had described some of the same ideas in a brief contribution to a symposium on welfare sponsored by Commentary.

The neoconservative label was (somewhat sardonically) adopted by Irving Kristol in his 1979 article "Confessions of a True, Self-Confessed 'Neoconservative'", which Kristol wrote as a response to The Neoconservatives: The Men Who are Changing America’s politics by Peter Steinfels His ideas have been influential since the 1950s, when he co-founded and edited the magazine Encounter.

Another source was Norman Podhoretz, editor of the magazine Commentary, from 1960 to 1995. In 1963, Podhortez called Clinton Rossiter and Walter Lippmann neoconservatives who refused to accept that government could be a force for doing good rather than merely “concentrating on restraint for the bad”. By 1982, Podhoretz was terming himself a neoconservative in The New York Times Magazine article titled "The Neoconservative Anguish over Reagan's Foreign Policy".

The term itself was the product of a rejection among formerly self-identified liberals of what they considered a growing leftward, antimilitaristic turn of the Democratic Party in the 1970s. Neoconservatives perceived an ideological effort to distance the Democratic Party and American liberalism from the hawkish Cold War liberalism as espoused by former Presidents Harry S. Truman, John F. Kennedy and Lyndon B. Johnson. After the Vietnam War, the anti-communist, internationalist and interventionist roots of this Cold War liberalism among the Left seemed increasingly brittle to the neoconservatives. As a consequence, they migrated to the Republican Party and formed one pillar of the Reagan Coalition and of the conservative movement. Hence, they became the new conservatives, supplanting the old conservatives, who were more nationalist and non-interventionist.

== History ==
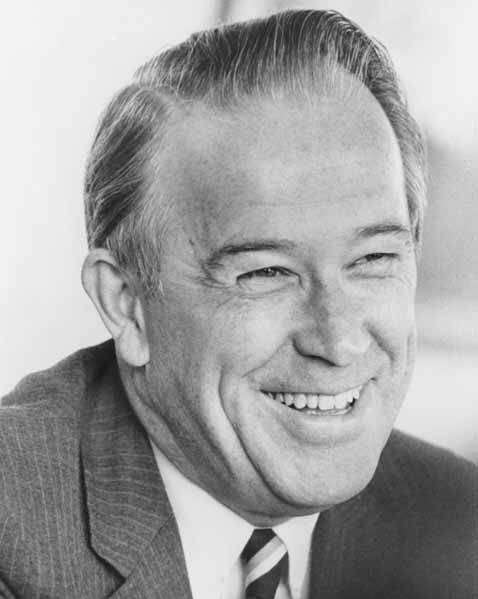
Senator Henry M. Jackson, an inspiration for neoconservative foreign policy during the 1970s

According to James Nuechterlein, prior to the formation of the movement, those who would become neoconservatives endorsed the civil rights movement, racial integration, and Martin Luther King Jr.

Neoconservatism was initiated as a reaction against the liberals' repudiation of the Cold War, against the "New Politics" of the American Left, which Norman Podhoretz said was too sympathetic to the radical counterculture that alienated the majority of the population, and against the repudiation of "anti-anticommunism" by liberals, which included substantial endorsement of Marxist–Leninist politics by the New Left during the late 1960s. Some neoconservatives were particularly alarmed by what they believed were the antisemitic sentiments of Black Power advocates. Irving Kristol edited the journal The Public Interest (1965–2005), featuring economists and political scientists, which emphasized ways that government planning in the liberal state had produced unintended harmful consequences. Some early neoconservative political figures were disillusioned Democratic politicians and intellectuals, such as Daniel Patrick Moynihan, who served in the Nixon and Ford administrations, and Jeane Kirkpatrick, who served as United States Ambassador to the United Nations in the Reagan administration. Some left-wing academics such as Frank Meyer and James Burnham eventually became associated with the conservative movement at this time.

A substantial number of neoconservatives were originally moderate socialists who were originally associated with the moderate wing of the Socialist Party of America (SP) and its successor party, the Social Democrats, USA (SDUSA). Max Shachtman, a former Trotskyist theorist who developed strong feelings of antipathy towards the New Left, had numerous devotees in the SDUSA with strong links to George Meany's AFL-CIO. Following Shachtman and Meany, this faction led the SP to oppose immediate withdrawal from the Vietnam War and oppose George McGovern in the Democratic primary race and, to some extent, the general election. They also chose to cease their own party-building and concentrated on working within the Democratic Party, eventually influencing it through the Democratic Leadership Council. Thus the Socialist Party dissolved in 1972, and the SDUSA emerged that year. (Most of the left wing of the party, led by Michael Harrington, immediately abandoned the SDUSA.) SDUSA leaders associated with neoconservatism include Carl Gershman, Penn Kemble, Joshua Muravchik and Bayard Rustin.

Norman Podhoretz's magazine Commentary, originally a journal of liberalism, became a major publication for neoconservatives during the 1970s. Commentary published an article by Jeane Kirkpatrick, an early and prototypical neoconservative.

=== Rejecting the American New Left and McGovern's New Politics ===
As the policies of the New Left made the Democrats increasingly leftist, these neoconservative intellectuals became disillusioned with President Lyndon B. Johnson's Great Society domestic programs. The influential 1970 bestseller The Real Majority by Ben Wattenberg expressed that the "real majority" of the electorate endorsed economic interventionism but also social conservatism and that it could be disastrous for Democrats to adopt liberal positions on certain social and crime issues.

These liberal intellectuals rejected the countercultural New Left and what they considered anti-Americanism in their pacifist activism against the Vietnam War. After the anti-war faction took control of the party during 1972 and nominated George McGovern, these liberal intellectuals endorsed Washington Senator Henry "Scoop" Jackson for his unsuccessful 1972 and 1976 campaigns for president. Among those who worked for Jackson were the incipient neoconservatives Paul Wolfowitz, Doug Feith, and Richard Perle.

Neoconservatism can also be traced back to political and social conflicts of the late 1960s, particularly the 1967 Six-Day War in the Middle East and the 1968 New York City teachers' strike. These events contributed to a political realignment among these liberals, many of whom became disenchanted with segments of the left that they viewed as increasingly radical or intolerant, including the use of anti-Semitic themes in political discourse. During this period, these figures began to adopt more conservative positions while also developing a stronger identification with Jewish interests, a combination that later influenced neoconservatism’s generally pro-Israel orientation.

During the late 1970s, neoconservatives tended to endorse Ronald Reagan, the Republican who promised to confront Soviet expansionism. Neoconservatives organized in the American Enterprise Institute and The Heritage Foundation to counter the liberal establishment. Author Keith Preston named the successful effort on behalf of neoconservatives such as George Will and Irving Kristol to cancel Reagan's 1980 nomination of Mel Bradford, a Southern Paleoconservative academic whose regionalist focus and writings about Abraham Lincoln and Reconstruction alienated the more cosmopolitan and progress-oriented neoconservatives, to the leadership of the National Endowment for the Humanities in favor of longtime Democrat William Bennett as emblematic of the neoconservative movement establishing hegemony over mainstream American conservatism.

In another (2004) article, Michael Lind also wrote:

Neoconservatism ... originated in the 1970s as a movement of anti-Soviet liberals and social democrats in the tradition of Truman, Kennedy, Johnson, Humphrey and Henry ('Scoop') Jackson, many of whom preferred to call themselves 'paleoliberals.' [After the end of the Cold War] ... many 'paleoliberals' drifted back to the Democratic center ... Today's neocons are a shrunken remnant of the original broad neocon coalition. Nevertheless, the origins of their ideology on the left are still apparent. The fact that most of the younger neocons were never on the left is irrelevant; they are the intellectual (and, in the case of William Kristol and John Podhoretz, the literal) heirs of older ex-leftists.

=== Leo Strauss and his students ===
C. Bradley Thompson, a professor at Clemson University, claims that most influential neoconservatives refer explicitly to the theoretical ideas in the philosophy of Leo Strauss (1899–1973), although there are several writers who claim that in doing so they may draw upon meaning that Strauss himself did not endorse. Eugene Sheppard notes: "Much scholarship tends to understand Strauss as an inspirational founder of American neoconservatism". Strauss was a refugee from Nazi Germany who taught at the New School for Social Research in New York (1938–1948) and the University of Chicago (1949–1969).

Strauss asserted that "the crisis of the West consists in the West's having become uncertain of its purpose". His solution was a restoration of the vital ideas and faith that in the past had sustained the moral purpose of the West. The Greek classics (classical republican and modern republican), political philosophy and the Judeo-Christian heritage are the essentials of the Great Tradition in Strauss's work. Strauss emphasized the spirit of the Greek classics and Thomas G. West (1991) argues that for Strauss the American Founding Fathers were correct in their understanding of the classics in their principles of justice.

For Strauss, political community is defined by convictions about justice and happiness rather than by sovereignty and force. A classical liberal, he repudiated the philosophy of John Locke as a bridge to 20th-century historicism and nihilism and instead defended liberal democracy as closer to the spirit of the classics than other modern regimes. For Strauss, the American awareness of ineradicable evil in human nature and hence the need for morality, was a beneficial outgrowth of the pre-modern Western tradition. O'Neill (2009) notes that Strauss wrote little about American topics, but his students wrote a great deal and that Strauss's influence caused his students to reject historicism and positivism as morally relativist positions. They instead promoted a so-called Aristotelian perspective on America that produced a qualified defense of its liberal constitutionalism. Strauss's emphasis on moral clarity led the Straussians to develop an approach to international relations that Catherine and Michael Zuckert (2008) call Straussian Wilsonianism (or Straussian idealism), the defense of liberal democracy in the face of its vulnerability.

Strauss influenced The Weekly Standard editor Bill Kristol, William Bennett, Newt Gingrich, Antonin Scalia and Clarence Thomas, as well as Paul Wolfowitz.

=== Jeane Kirkpatrick ===
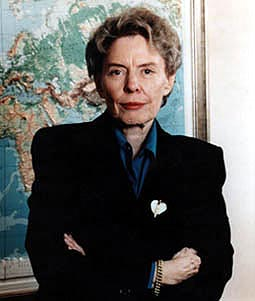
Jeane Kirkpatrick

A theory of neoconservative foreign policy during the final years of the Cold War was articulated by Jeane Kirkpatrick in "Dictatorships and Double Standards", published in Commentary Magazine during November 1979. Kirkpatrick criticized the foreign policy of Jimmy Carter, which endorsed détente with the Soviet Union. She later served the Reagan Administration as Ambassador to the United Nations.

==== Skepticism towards democracy promotion ====
In "Dictatorships and Double Standards", Kirkpatrick distinguished between authoritarian regimes and the totalitarian regimes such as the Soviet Union. She suggested that in some countries democracy was not tenable and the United States had a choice between endorsing authoritarian governments, which might evolve into democracies, or Marxist–Leninist regimes, which she argued had never been ended once they achieved totalitarian control. In such tragic circumstances, she argued that allying with authoritarian governments might be prudent. Kirkpatrick argued that by demanding rapid liberalization in traditionally autocratic countries, the Carter administration had delivered those countries to Marxist–Leninists that were even more repressive. She further accused the Carter administration of a "double standard" and of never having applied its rhetoric on the necessity of liberalization to communist governments. The essay compares traditional autocracies and Communist regimes:

[Traditional autocrats] do not disturb the habitual rhythms of work and leisure, habitual places of residence, habitual patterns of family and personal relations. Because the miseries of traditional life are familiar, they are bearable to ordinary people who, growing up in the society, learn to cope.

[Revolutionary Communist regimes] claim jurisdiction over the whole life of the society and make demands for change that so violate internalized values and habits that inhabitants flee by the tens of thousands.

Kirkpatrick concluded that while the United States should encourage liberalization and democracy in autocratic countries, it should not do so when the government risks violent overthrow and should expect gradual change rather than immediate transformation. She wrote: "No idea holds greater sway in the mind of educated Americans than the belief that it is possible to democratize governments, anytime and anywhere, under any circumstances ... Decades, if not centuries, are normally required for people to acquire the necessary disciplines and habits. In Britain, the road [to democratic government] took seven centuries to traverse. ... The speed with which armies collapse, bureaucracies abdicate, and social structures dissolve once the autocrat is removed frequently surprises American policymakers".

=== 1990s ===
During the 1990s, neoconservatives were once again opposed to the foreign policy establishment, both during the Republican Administration of President George H. W. Bush and that of his Democratic successor, President Bill Clinton. Many critics charged that the neoconservatives lost their influence as a result of the end of the Soviet Union.

After the decision of George H. W. Bush to leave Saddam Hussein in power after the first Iraq War during 1991, many neoconservatives considered this policy and the decision not to endorse indigenous dissident groups such as the Kurds and Shiites in their 1991–1992 resistance to Hussein as a betrayal of democratic principles.

Some of those same targets of criticism would later become fierce advocates of neoconservative policies. During 1992, referring to the first Iraq War, then United States Secretary of Defense and future Vice President Richard Cheney said:

I would guess if we had gone in there, I would still have forces in Baghdad today. We'd be running the country. We would not have been able to get everybody out and bring everybody home. And the question in my mind is how many additional American casualties is Saddam [Hussein] worth? And the answer is not that damned many. So, I think we got it right, both when we decided to expel him from Kuwait, but also when the president made the decision that we'd achieved our objectives and we were not going to go get bogged down in the problems of trying to take over and govern Iraq.

A key neoconservative policy-forming document, A Clean Break: A New Strategy for Securing the Realm (commonly known as the "Clean Break" report) was published in 1996 by a study group of American-Jewish neoconservative strategists led by Richard Perle on the behest of newly-elected Israeli Prime Minister Benjamin Netanyahu. The report called for a new, more aggressive Middle East policy on the part of the United States in defense of the interests of Israel, including the removal of Saddam Hussein from power in Iraq and the containment of Syria through a series of proxy wars, the outright rejection of any solution to the Israeli–Palestinian conflict that would include a Palestinian state, and an alliance between Israel, Turkey and Jordan against Iraq, Syria and Iran. Former United States Assistant Secretary of Defense and leading neoconservative Richard Perle was the "Study Group Leader", but the final report included ideas from fellow neoconservatives, pro-Israel right-wingers and affiliates of Netanyahu's Likud party, such as Douglas Feith, James Colbert, Charles Fairbanks Jr., Jonathan Torop, David Wurmser, Meyrav Wurmser, and IASPS president Robert Loewenberg.

Within a few years of the Gulf War in Iraq, many neoconservatives were endorsing the ousting of Saddam Hussein. On 19 February 1998, an open letter to President Clinton was published, signed by dozens of pundits, many identified with neoconservatism and later related groups such as the Project for the New American Century, urging decisive action to remove Saddam from power.

Neoconservatives were also members of the so-called "Blue Team", which argued for a confrontational policy toward the People's Republic of China (the communist government of mainland China) and for strong military and diplomatic endorsement of the Republic of China (also known as Taiwan), as they believed that China will be a threat to the United States in the future.

=== Early 2000s: Administration of George W. Bush and Bush Doctrine ===
The Bush campaign and the early Bush administration did not exhibit strong endorsement of neoconservative principles. As a presidential candidate, Bush had argued for a restrained foreign policy, stating his opposition to the idea of nation-building. Also early in the administration, some neoconservatives criticized Bush's administration as insufficiently supportive of Israel and suggested Bush's foreign policies were not substantially different from those of President Clinton.

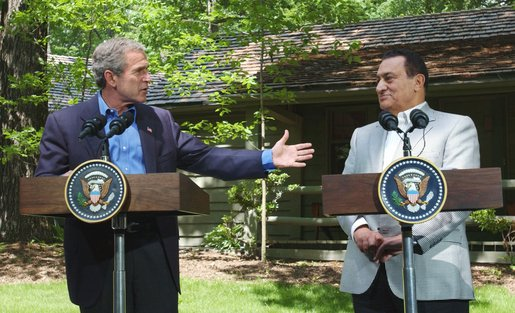
During November 2010, former U.S. President George W. Bush (here with the former President of Egypt Hosni Mubarak at Camp David in 2002) wrote in his memoir Decision Points that Mubarak endorsed the administration's position that Iraq had WMDs before the war with the country, but kept it private for fear of "inciting the Arab street".

Bush's policies changed dramatically immediately after the 11 September 2001 attacks.

During Bush's State of the Union speech of January 2002, he named Iraq, Iran and North Korea as states that "constitute an axis of evil" and "pose a grave and growing danger". Bush suggested the possibility of preemptive war: "I will not wait on events, while dangers gather. I will not stand by, as peril draws closer and closer. The United States of America will not permit the world's most dangerous regimes to threaten us with the world's most destructive weapons".

Some major defense and national-security persons have been quite critical of what they believed was a neoconservative influence in getting the United States to go to war against Iraq.

Former Nebraska Republican U.S. senator and Secretary of Defense, Chuck Hagel, who has been critical of the Bush administration's adoption of neoconservative ideology, in his book America: Our Next Chapter wrote:

So why did we invade Iraq? I believe it was the triumph of the so-called neo-conservative ideology, as well as Bush administration arrogance and incompetence that took America into this war of choice. ... They obviously made a convincing case to a president with very limited national security and foreign policy experience, who keenly felt the burden of leading the nation in the wake of the deadliest terrorist attack ever on American soil.

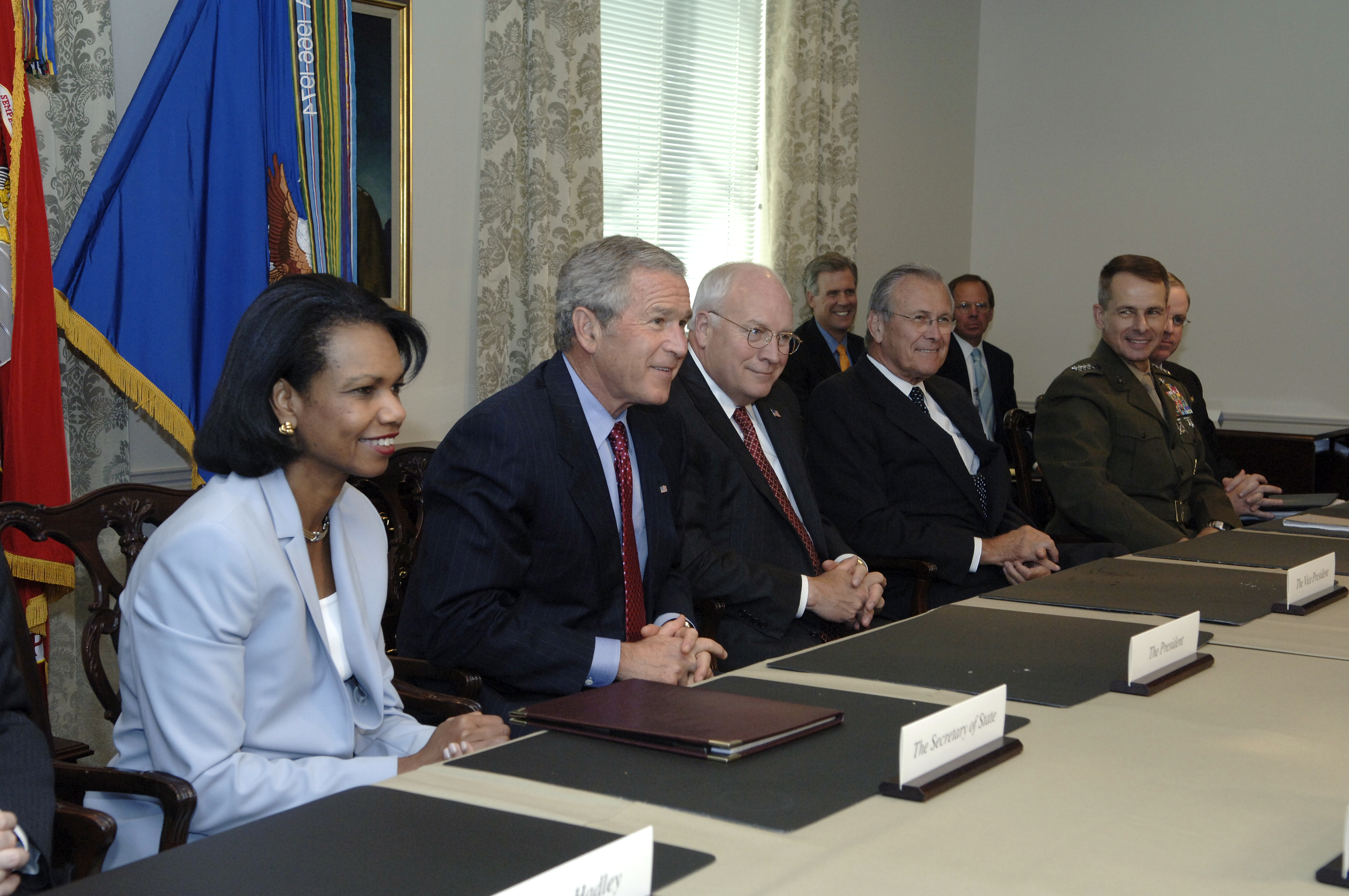
President Bush, VP Dick Cheney, and Secretary of State Condoleezza Rice meet with Secretary of Defense Donald Rumsfeld and his staff at the Pentagon, 14 August 2006.

The Bush Doctrine of preemptive war was stated explicitly in the National Security Council (NSC) text "National Security Strategy of the United States". published 20 September 2002: "We must deter and defend against the threat before it is unleashed ... even if uncertainty remains as to the time and place of the enemy's attack. ... The United States will, if necessary, act preemptively".

The choice not to use the word "preventive" in the 2002 National Security Strategy and instead use the word "preemptive" was largely in anticipation of the widely perceived illegality of preventive attacks in international law via both Charter Law and Customary Law. In this context, disputes over the non-aggression principle in domestic and foreign policy, especially given the doctrine of preemption, alternatively impede and facilitate studies of the impact of libertarian precepts on neo-conservatism.

Policy analysts noted that the Bush Doctrine as stated in the 2002 NSC document had a strong resemblance to recommendations presented originally in a controversial Defense Planning Guidance draft written during 1992 by Paul Wolfowitz, during the first Bush administration.

The Bush Doctrine was greeted with accolades by many neoconservatives. When asked whether he agreed with the Bush Doctrine, Max Boot said he did and that "I think [Bush is] exactly right to say we can't sit back and wait for the next terrorist strike on Manhattan. We have to go out and stop the terrorists overseas. We have to play the role of the global policeman. ... But I also argue that we ought to go further". Discussing the significance of the Bush Doctrine, neoconservative writer Bill Kristol claimed: "The world is a mess. And, I think, it's very much to Bush's credit that he's gotten serious about dealing with it. ... The danger is not that we're going to do too much. The danger is that we're going to do too little".

=== 2008 presidential election and aftermath ===
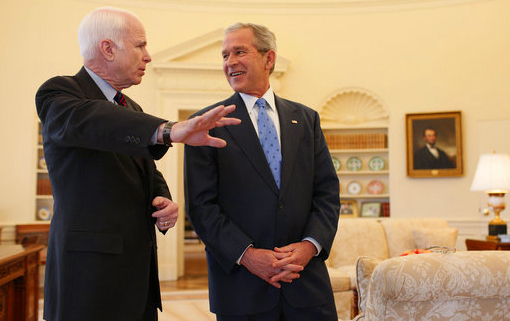
President George W. Bush and Senator John McCain at the White House, 5 March 2008, after McCain became the Republican presumptive presidential nominee

John McCain, who was the Republican candidate for the 2008 United States presidential election, endorsed continuing the second Iraq War, "the issue that is most clearly identified with the neoconservatives". The New York Times reported further that his foreign policy views combined elements of neoconservatism and the main competing conservative opinion, pragmatism, also known as realism:

Among [McCain's advisers] are several prominent neoconservatives, including Robert Kagan ... [and] Max Boot... 'It may be too strong a term to say a fight is going on over John McCain's soul,' said Lawrence Eagleburger ... who is a member of the pragmatist camp, ... [but he] said, "there is no question that a lot of my far right friends have now decided that since you can't beat him, let's persuade him to slide over as best we can on these critical issues.

Barack Obama campaigned for the Democratic nomination during 2008 by attacking his opponents, especially Hillary Clinton, for originally endorsing Bush's Iraq-war policies. Obama maintained a selection of prominent military officials from the Bush administration including Robert Gates (Bush's Defense Secretary) and David Petraeus (Bush's ranking general in Iraq). Neoconservative politician Victoria Nuland, former U.S. Ambassador to NATO under Bush, was made United States Under Secretary of State by Obama.

=== 2010s and early 2020s ===
By 2010, U.S. forces had switched from combat to a training role in Iraq and they left in 2011. The neocons had little influence in the Obama White House, and neo-conservatives have lost much influence in the Republican party since the rise of the Tea Party Movement.

Within the Republican establishment, however, neoconservative influences persisted with their intense opposition to the Joint Comprehensive Plan of Action (JCPOA) (also known as the Iranian nuclear deal) and their opposition to Vladimir Putin in Russia. Carl Gershman, the president of the National Endowment for Democracy and a neoconservative, wrote in a Washington Post op-ed in September 2013 that identified Ukraine as "the biggest prize" and an "important interim step towards toppling Putin."

Several neoconservatives played a major role in the Stop Trump movement in 2016, in opposition to the Republican presidential candidacy of Donald Trump, due to his criticism of interventionist foreign policies, as well as their perception of him as an "authoritarian" figure. After Trump took office, some neoconservatives joined his administration, such as John Bolton, Mike Pompeo, Elliott Abrams and Nadia Schadlow. Neoconservatives have supported the Trump administration's hawkish approach towards Iran and Venezuela, while opposing the administration's withdrawal of troops from Syria and diplomatic outreach to North Korea. Although neoconservatives have served in the Trump administration, they have been observed to have been slowly overtaken by the nascent populist and national conservative movements, and to have struggled to adapt to a changing geopolitical atmosphere. The Lincoln Project, a political action committee consisting of current and former Republicans with the purpose of defeating Trump in the 2020 United States presidential election and Republican Senate candidates in the 2020 United States Senate elections, has been described as being primarily made of neoconservative activists seeking to return the Republican party to Bush-era ideology. Although Trump was not reelected and the Republicans failed to retain a majority in the Senate, surprising success in the 2020 United States House of Representatives elections and internal conflicts led to renewed questions about the strength of neoconservatism.

In the Biden administration, neoconservative Victoria Nuland retained the portfolio of Under Secretary of State she had held under Obama. President Joe Biden's top diplomat for Afghanistan, Zalmay Khalilzad, was also a neocon and a former Bush administration official. In the 2024 U.S. presidential election, neoconservatives including the Cheney family (Dick & Liz) and Adam Kinzinger supported Vice President Kamala Harris' campaign. After losing the election, Harris' campaign team was criticized by those within the Democratic camp for allying with neoconservatives.

In the second Trump administration, senior officials including Secretary of State Marco Rubio and National Security Advisor Mike Waltz have been described as neoconservatives. Critics argue that U.S. military strikes on Iran and Venezuela in the first year of Trump's second presidency constitute a "neocon shift" in Trump's policy compared to his first term.

== Evolution of opinions ==
=== Usage and general views ===
During the early 1970s, socialist Michael Harrington was one of the first to use "neoconservative" in its modern meaning. He characterized neoconservatives as former leftists – whom he derided as "socialists for Nixon" – who had become more conservative. These people tended to remain endorsers of social democracy, but distinguished themselves by allying with the Nixon administration with respect to foreign policy, especially by their endorsement of the Vietnam War and opposition to the Soviet Union. They still endorsed the welfare state, but not necessarily in its contemporary form.

External videos
- Booknotes interview with Irving Kristol on Neoconservatism: The Autobiography of an Idea, 1995, C-SPAN

Irving Kristol remarked that a neoconservative is a "liberal mugged by reality", one who became more conservative after seeing the results of liberal policies. Kristol also distinguished three specific aspects of neoconservatism from previous types of conservatism: neo-conservatives had a forward-looking attitude from their liberal heritage, rather than the reactionary and dour attitude of previous conservatives; they had a meliorative attitude, proposing alternate reforms rather than simply attacking social liberal reforms; and they took philosophical ideas and ideologies very seriously.

During January 2009, at the end of President George W. Bush's second term in office, Jonathan Clarke, a senior fellow at the Carnegie Council for Ethics in International Affairs and prominent critic of Neoconservatism, proposed the following as the "main characteristics of neoconservatism": "a tendency to see the world in binary good/evil terms", a "low tolerance for diplomacy", a "readiness to use military force", an "emphasis on US unilateral action", a "disdain for multilateral organizations" and a "focus on the Middle East".

=== Opinions concerning foreign policy ===
In foreign policy, the neoconservatives' main concern is to prevent the development of a new rival. Defense Planning Guidance, a document prepared during 1992 by Under Secretary for Defense for Policy Paul Wolfowitz, is regarded by Distinguished Professor of the Humanities John McGowan at the University of North Carolina as the "quintessential statement of neoconservative thought". The report says:

Our first objective is to prevent the re-emergence of a new rival, either on the territory of the former Soviet Union or elsewhere, that poses a threat on the order of that posed formerly by the Soviet Union. This is a dominant consideration underlying the new regional defense strategy and requires that we endeavor to prevent any hostile power from dominating a region whose resources would, under consolidated control, be sufficient to generate global power.

According to Lead Editor of e-International Relations Stephen McGlinchey: "Neo-conservatism is something of a chimera in modern politics. For its opponents it is a distinct political ideology that emphasizes the blending of military power with Wilsonian idealism, yet for its supporters it is more of a 'persuasion' that individuals of many types drift into and out of. Regardless of which is more correct, it is now widely accepted that the neo-conservative impulse has been visible in modern American foreign policy and that it has left a distinct impact".

Neoconservatism first developed during the late 1960s as an effort to oppose the radical cultural changes occurring within the United States. Irving Kristol wrote: "If there is any one thing that neoconservatives are unanimous about, it is their dislike of the counterculture". Norman Podhoretz agreed: "Revulsion against the counterculture accounted for more converts to neoconservatism than any other single factor". Neoconservatives began to emphasize foreign issues during the mid-1970s.

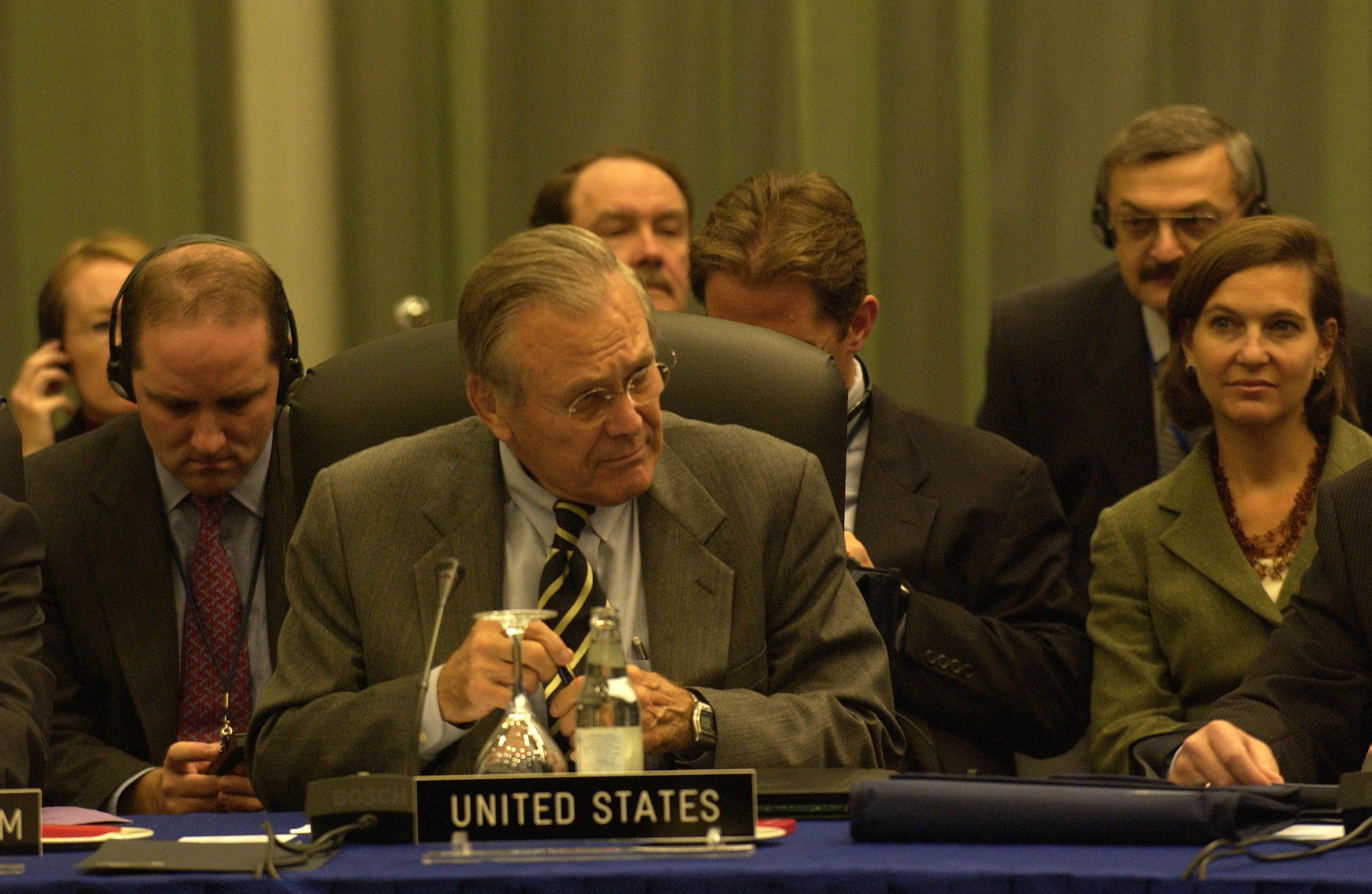
Donald Rumsfeld and Victoria Nuland at the NATO–Ukraine consultations in Vilnius, Lithuania, 24 October 2005

In 1979, an early study by liberal Peter Steinfels concentrated on the ideas of Irving Kristol, Daniel Patrick Moynihan and Daniel Bell. He noted that the stress on foreign affairs "emerged after the New Left and the counterculture had dissolved as convincing foils for neoconservatism ... The essential source of their anxiety is not military or geopolitical or to be found overseas at all; it is domestic and cultural and ideological".

Neoconservative foreign policy is a descendant of so-called Wilsonian idealism. Neoconservatives endorse democracy promotion by the U.S. and other democracies, based on the conviction that natural rights are both universal and transcendent in nature. They criticized the United Nations and détente with the Soviet Union. On domestic policy, they endorse reductions in the welfare state, like European and Canadian conservatives. According to Norman Podhoretz, "'the neo-conservatives dissociated themselves from the wholesale opposition to the welfare state which had marked American conservatism since the days of the New Deal' and ... while neoconservatives supported 'setting certain limits' to the welfare state, those limits did not involve 'issues of principle, such as the legitimate size and role of the central government in the American constitutional order' but were to be 'determined by practical considerations'".

In April 2006, Robert Kagan wrote in The Washington Post that Russia and China may be the greatest "challenge liberalism faces today":

The main protagonists on the side of autocracy will not be the petty dictatorships of the Middle East theoretically targeted by the Bush doctrine. They will be the two great autocratic powers, China and Russia, which pose an old challenge not envisioned within the new 'war on terror' paradigm. ... Their reactions to the 'color revolutions' in Ukraine, Georgia and Kyrgyzstan were hostile and suspicious, and understandably so. ... Might not the successful liberalization of Ukraine, urged and supported by the Western democracies, be but the prelude to the incorporation of that nation into NATO and the European Union – in short, the expansion of Western liberal hegemony?

Trying to describe the evolution within the neoconservative school of thought is bedeviled by the fact that a coherent version of Neoconservatism is difficult to distill from the various diverging voices who are nevertheless considered to be neoconservative. On the one hand were individuals such as former Ambassador Jeane Kirkpatrick who embodied views that were hawkish yet still fundamentally in line with Realpolitik. The more institutionalized neoconservatism that exerted influence through think tanks, the media and government officials, rejected Realpolitik and thus the Kirkpatrick Doctrine. This rejection became an impetus to push for active US support for democratic transitions in various autocratic nations.

In the 1990s leading thinkers of this modern strand of the neoconservative school of thought, Robert Kagan and Bill Kristol, published an essay in which they lay out the basic tenets of what they call a Neo-Reaganite foreign policy. In it they reject a "return to normalcy" after the end of the Cold War and argue that the United States should instead double down on defending and extending the liberal International order. They trace the origin of their approach to foreign policy back to the foundation of the United States as a revolutionary, liberal capitalist republic. As opposed to advocates of Realpolitik, they argue that domestic politics and foreign policies are inextricably linked making it natural for any nation to be influenced by ideology, ideals and concepts of morality in their respective international conduct. Hence, this archetypical neoconservative position attempts to overcome the dichotomy of pragmatism and idealism emphasizing instead that a values-driven foreign policy is not just consistent with American historical tradition but that it is in the enlightened self-interest of the United States.

=== Views on economics ===
While neoconservatism is concerned primarily with foreign policy, there is also some discussion of internal economic policies. Neoconservatism generally endorses free markets and capitalism, favoring supply-side economics, but it has several disagreements with classical liberalism and fiscal conservatism. Irving Kristol states that neocons are more relaxed about budget deficits and tend to reject the Hayekian notion that the growth of government influence on society and public welfare is "the road to serfdom". Indeed, to safeguard democracy, government intervention and budget deficits may sometimes be necessary, Kristol argues. After the so-called "reconciliation with capitalism", self-identified "neoconservatives" frequently favored a reduced welfare state, but not its elimination.

Neoconservative ideology stresses that while free markets do provide material goods in an efficient way, they lack the moral guidance human beings need to fulfill their needs. They say that morality can be found only in tradition and that markets do pose questions that cannot be solved solely by economics, arguing: "So, as the economy only makes up part of our lives, it must not be allowed to take over and entirely dictate to our society". Critics consider neoconservatism a bellicose and "heroic" ideology opposed to "mercantile" and "bourgeois" virtues and therefore "a variant of anti-economic thought". Political scientist Zeev Sternhell states: "Neoconservatism has succeeded in convincing the great majority of Americans that the main questions that concern a society are not economic, and that social questions are really moral questions".

=== Friction with other conservatives ===
Many conservatives oppose neoconservative policies and have critical views on it. Disputes over the non-aggression principle in domestic and foreign policy, especially given the doctrine of preemption, can impede (and facilitate) studies of the impact of libertarian precepts on neo-conservatism, but that of course didn't, and still doesn't, stop pundits from publishing appraisals. For example, Stefan Halper and Jonathan Clarke (a libertarian based at Cato), in their 2004 book on neoconservatism, America Alone: The Neo-Conservatives and the Global Order, characterized the neoconservatives at that time as uniting around three common themes:

1. A belief deriving from religious conviction that the human condition is defined as a choice between good and evil and that the true measure of political character is to be found in the willingness by the former (themselves) to confront the latter.
2. An assertion that the fundamental determinant of the relationship between states rests on military power and the willingness to use it.
3. A primary focus on the Middle East and global Islam as the principal theater for American overseas interests.

In putting these themes into practice, neo-conservatives:

1. Analyze international issues in black-and-white, absolute moral categories. They are fortified by a conviction that they alone hold the moral high ground and argue that disagreement is tantamount to defeatism.
2. Focus on the "unipolar" power of the United States, seeing the use of military force as the first, not the last, option of foreign policy. They repudiate the "lessons of Vietnam", which they interpret as undermining American will toward the use of force, and embrace the "lessons of Munich", interpreted as establishing the virtues of preemptive military action.
3. Disdain conventional diplomatic agencies such as the State Department and conventional country-specific, realist, and pragmatic, analysis (see shoot first and ask questions later). They are hostile toward nonmilitary multilateral institutions and instinctively antagonistic toward international treaties and agreements. "Global unilateralism" is their watchword. They are fortified by international criticism, believing that it confirms American virtue.
4. Look to the Reagan administration as the exemplar of all these virtues and seek to establish their version of Reagan's legacy as the Republican and national orthodoxy.

Responding to a question about neoconservatives in 2004, William F. Buckley Jr. said: "I think those I know, which is most of them, are bright, informed and idealistic, but that they simply overrate the reach of U.S. power and influence".

=== Friction with paleoconservatism ===
Starting during the 1980s, disputes concerning Israel and public policy contributed to a conflict with paleoconservatives. Pat Buchanan terms neoconservatism "a globalist, interventionist, open borders ideology". Paul Gottfried has written that the neocons' call for "permanent revolution" exists independently of their beliefs about Israel, characterizing the neoconservatives as "ranters out of a Dostoyevskian novel, who are out to practice permanent revolution courtesy of the U.S. government" and questioning how anyone could mistake them for conservatives.

What make neocons most dangerous are not their isolated ghetto hang-ups, like hating Germans and Southern whites and calling everyone and his cousin an anti-Semite, but the leftist revolutionary fury they express.

He has also argued that domestic equality and the exportability of democracy are points of contention between them.

Paul Craig Roberts, United States Assistant Secretary of the Treasury for Economic Policy during the Reagan administration and associated with paleoconservatism stated in 2003 that "there is nothing conservative about neoconservatives. Neocons hide behind 'conservative' but they are in fact Jacobins. Jacobins were the 18th century French revolutionaries whose intention to remake Europe in revolutionary France's image launched the Napoleonic Wars".

==== Trotskyism allegation ====
Critics have argued that since the founders of neo-conservatism included ex-Trotskyists, Trotskyist traits continue to characterize neo-conservative ideologies and practices. During the Reagan administration, the charge was made that the foreign policy of the Reagan administration was being managed by ex-Trotskyists. This claim was cited by Seymour Martin Lipset, who was a neoconservative and former Trotskyist himself. This "Trotskyist" charge was repeated and widened by journalist Michael Lind during 2003 to assert a takeover of the foreign policy of the George W. Bush administration by former Trotskyists; Lind's "amalgamation of the defense intellectuals with the traditions and theories of 'the largely Jewish-American Trotskyist movement' [in Lind's words]" was criticized during 2003 by University of Michigan professor Alan M. Wald, who had discussed Trotskyism in his history of "The New York Intellectuals".

The charge that neoconservativism is related to Leninism has also been made by Francis Fukuyama. He argued that both believe in the "existence of a long-term process of social evolution", though neoconservatives seek to establish liberal democracy instead of communism. He wrote that neoconservatives "believed that history can be pushed along with the right application of power and will. Leninism was a tragedy in its Bolshevik version, and it has returned as farce when practiced by the United States. Neoconservatism, as both a political symbol and a body of thought, has evolved into something I can no longer support". However, these comparisons ignore anti-capitalist and anti-imperialist positions central to Leninism, which run contradictory to core neoconservative beliefs.

== Criticism ==
Critics of neoconservatism take issue with neoconservatives' support for interventionistic foreign policy. Critics from the left take issue with what they characterize as unilateralism and lack of concern with international consensus through organizations such as the United Nations.

Critics from both the left and right have assailed neoconservatives for the role Israel plays in their policies on the Middle East.

Neoconservatives respond by describing their shared opinion as a belief that national security is best attained by actively promoting freedom and democracy abroad as in the democratic peace theory through the endorsement of democracy, foreign aid and in certain cases military intervention. This is different from the traditional conservative tendency to endorse friendly regimes in matters of trade and anti-communism even at the expense of undermining existing democratic systems.

In a column on The New York Times named "Years of Shame" commemorating the tenth anniversary of 9/11, Paul Krugman criticized them for causing a supposedly entirely unrelated war.

=== Adherence to conservatism ===
Former Republican Congressman Ron Paul (now a Libertarian politician) has been a longtime critic of neoconservativism as an attack on freedom and the Constitution, including an extensive speech on the House floor addressing neoconservative beginnings and how neoconservatism is neither new nor conservative.

=== Imperialism and secrecy ===
John McGowan, professor of humanities at the University of North Carolina, states after an extensive review of neoconservative literature and theory that neoconservatives are attempting to build an American Empire, seen as successor to the British Empire, its goal being to perpetuate a "Pax Americana". As imperialism is largely considered unacceptable by the American media, neoconservatives do not articulate their ideas and goals in a frank manner in public discourse. McGowan states:

Frank neoconservatives like Robert Kaplan and Niall Ferguson recognize that they are proposing imperialism as the alternative to liberal internationalism. Yet both Kaplan and Ferguson also understand that imperialism runs so counter to American's liberal tradition that it must ... remain a foreign policy that dare not speak its name ... While Ferguson, the Brit, laments that Americans cannot just openly shoulder the white man's burden, Kaplan the American, tells us that "only through stealth and anxious foresight" can the United States continue to pursue the "imperial reality [that] already dominates our foreign policy", but must be disavowed in light of "our anti-imperial traditions, and ... the fact that imperialism is delegitimized in public discourse"... The Bush administration, justifying all of its actions by an appeal to "national security", has kept as many of those actions as it can secret and has scorned all limitations to executive power by other branches of government or international law.

== Notable people associated with neoconservatism ==
The list includes public people identified as personally neoconservative at an important time or a high official with numerous neoconservative advisers, such as George W. Bush and Dick Cheney.

=== Second presidency of Donald Trump ===
Below are the officials from Trump's second presidency characterized by their support for an aggressive, neoconservative foreign policy, especially in terms of deterring China's rising foreign policy.

- Mike Waltz – current U.S. Ambassador to the United Nations, former U.S. National Security Advisor and Army Special Forces officer. Regarded as a neoconservative in the Bush–Cheney tradition, Waltz served in the Bush administration as a defense policy director in the Pentagon and as counterterrorism advisor to the 46th vice president Dick Cheney.
- Marco Rubio – current United States secretary of state, former U.S. Senator from Florida, and 2016 Republican presidential candidate

=== Politicians ===
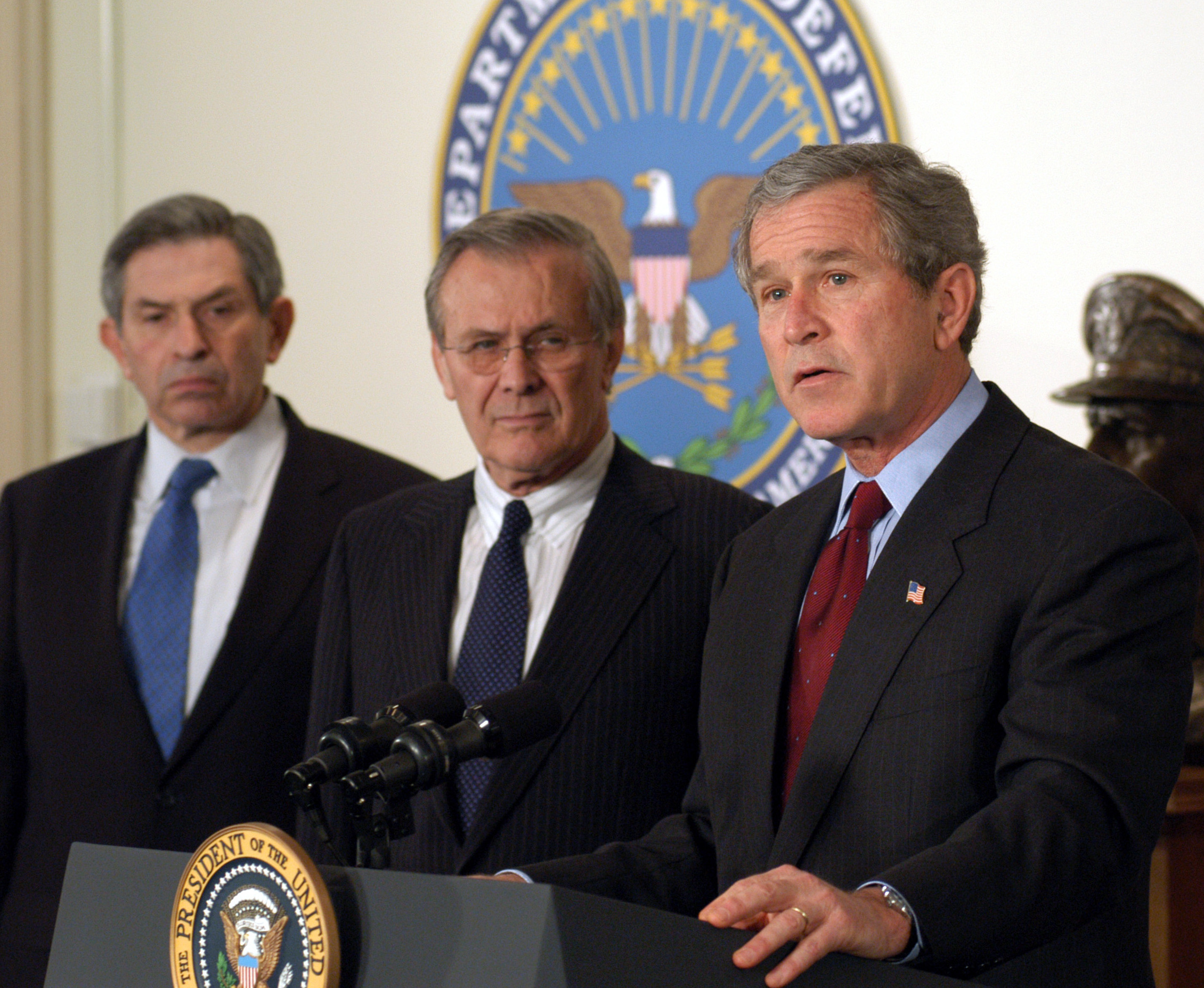
George W. Bush announces his $74.7 billion wartime supplemental budget request as Donald Rumsfeld and Paul Wolfowitz look on.

- George W. Bush – 43rd U.S. President, 46th U.S. Governor of Texas
- Jeb Bush – 43rd U.S. Governor of Florida, 2016 Republican presidential candidate
- Dick Cheney – 46th U.S. Vice President
- Donald Rumsfeld – former U.S. Secretary of Defense
- Newt Gingrich – 50th Speaker of the U.S. House of Representatives, 2012 Republican presidential candidate
- Henry "Scoop" Jackson – former U.S. Senator from Washington
- Mark Kirk – former U.S. Senator from Illinois
- Joe Lieberman – former U.S. Senator from Connecticut, 2004 Democratic presidential candidate, 2000 Democratic vice-presidential nominee
- John McCain – former U.S. Representative and U.S. Senator from Arizona, 2000 Republican presidential candidate, 2008 Republican presidential nominee
- Daniel Patrick Moynihan – former U.S. Senator from New York
- Lindsey Graham – former U.S. Senator from South Carolina, 2016 Republican presidential candidate
- Mitch McConnell – U.S. Senator from Kentucky and Chair of the Senate Rules Committee
- Michael McCaul – U.S. Representative from Texas
- Mike Gallagher – former U.S. Representative from Wisconsin and Chair of the House Committee on the Chinese Communist Party
- Mike Pompeo – former Director of the Central Intelligence Agency and 70th United States secretary of state
- Asa Hutchinson – 46th U.S. Governor of Arkansas, 2024 Republican presidential candidate
- Nikki Haley – 29th U.S. Ambassador to the United Nations, 116th U.S. Governor of South Carolina, 2024 Republican presidential candidate
- Mike Turner – U.S. Representative from Ohio
- Tom Cotton – U.S. Senator and former Representative from Arkansas
- Don Bacon – U.S. Representative from Nebraska and former U.S. Air Force General

=== Government officials ===
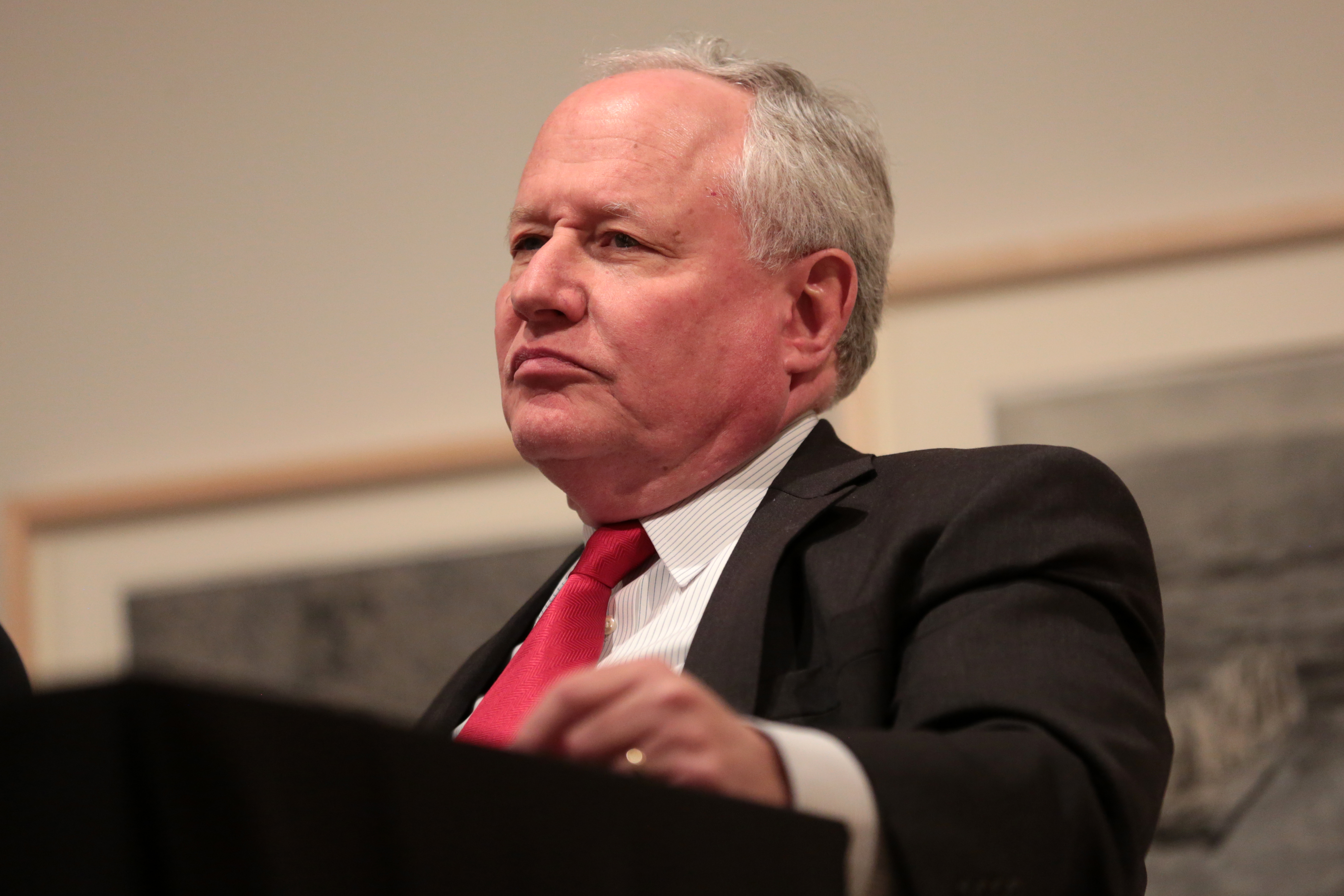
Bill Kristol orating at Arizona State University in March 2017

- John P. Walters – former U.S. government official, current President and Chief Executive Officer of Hudson Institute
- Nadia Schadlow – academic and defense-related government officer
- Elliott Abrams – foreign policy advisor
- Richard Perle – former Assistant Secretary of Defense and lobbyist
- John R. Bolton – former National Security Advisor and 25th U.S. Ambassador to the United Nations
- Kenneth Adelman – former Director of Arms Control and Disarmament Agency
- William Bennett – former chairman of the National Endowment for the Humanities, former Director of the National Drug Control Policy and former U.S. Secretary of Education
- Stephen Cambone – former United States Under Secretary of Defense for Intelligence and Security
- Eliot A. Cohen – former State Department Counselor, now Robert E. Osgood Professor of Strategic Studies at the Paul H. Nitze School of Advanced International Studies at the Johns Hopkins University
- Eric S. Edelman – former Under Secretary of Defense for Policy
- Douglas J. Feith – former Under Secretary of Defense for Policy
- Stephen Hadley – former National Security Advisor
- John P. Hannah – former national security adviser to U.S. Vice President Dick Cheney
- Robert Joseph – former Under Secretary of State for Arms Control and International Security
- Jack Keane – former Vice Chief of Staff of the United States Army
- Jeane Kirkpatrick – former Ambassador to the United Nations under Ronald Reagan, influenced by traditional realist thinking
- David J. Kramer – Executive Director of the George W. Bush Institute, former Assistant Secretary of State for Democracy, Human Rights and Labor
- Bill Kristol – former Chief of Staff to the Vice President of the United States, co-founder and former editor of The Weekly Standard and editor-at-large of The Bulwark, professor of political philosophy and American politics and political adviser
- Scooter Libby – former Chief of Staff to the Vice President of the United States
- Victoria Nuland – former Under Secretary of State for Political Affairs
- Condoleezza Rice – former National Security Advisor and 66th United States Secretary of State
- Randy Scheunemann – foreign policy advisor and lobbyist
- Abram Shulsky – Director of the Office of Special Plans
- Kurt Volker – former U.S. Permanent Representative to NATO
- Paul Wolfowitz – former State and Defense Department official
- R. James Woolsey Jr. – former Undersecretary of the Navy, former Director of Central Intelligence, green energy lobbyist
- Zalmay Khalilzad – former U.S. Ambassador to the United Nations

=== Public figures ===
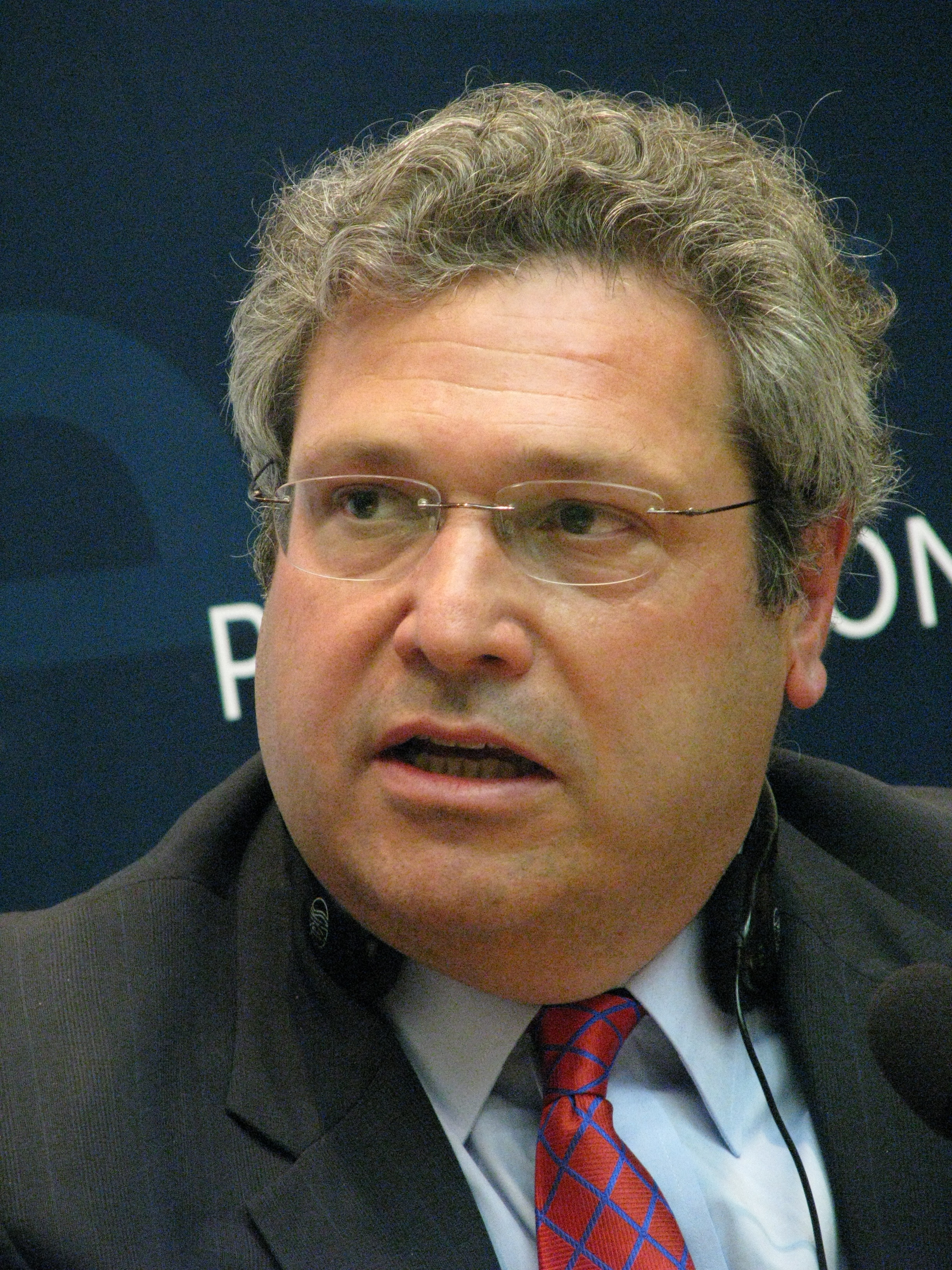
Robert Kagan

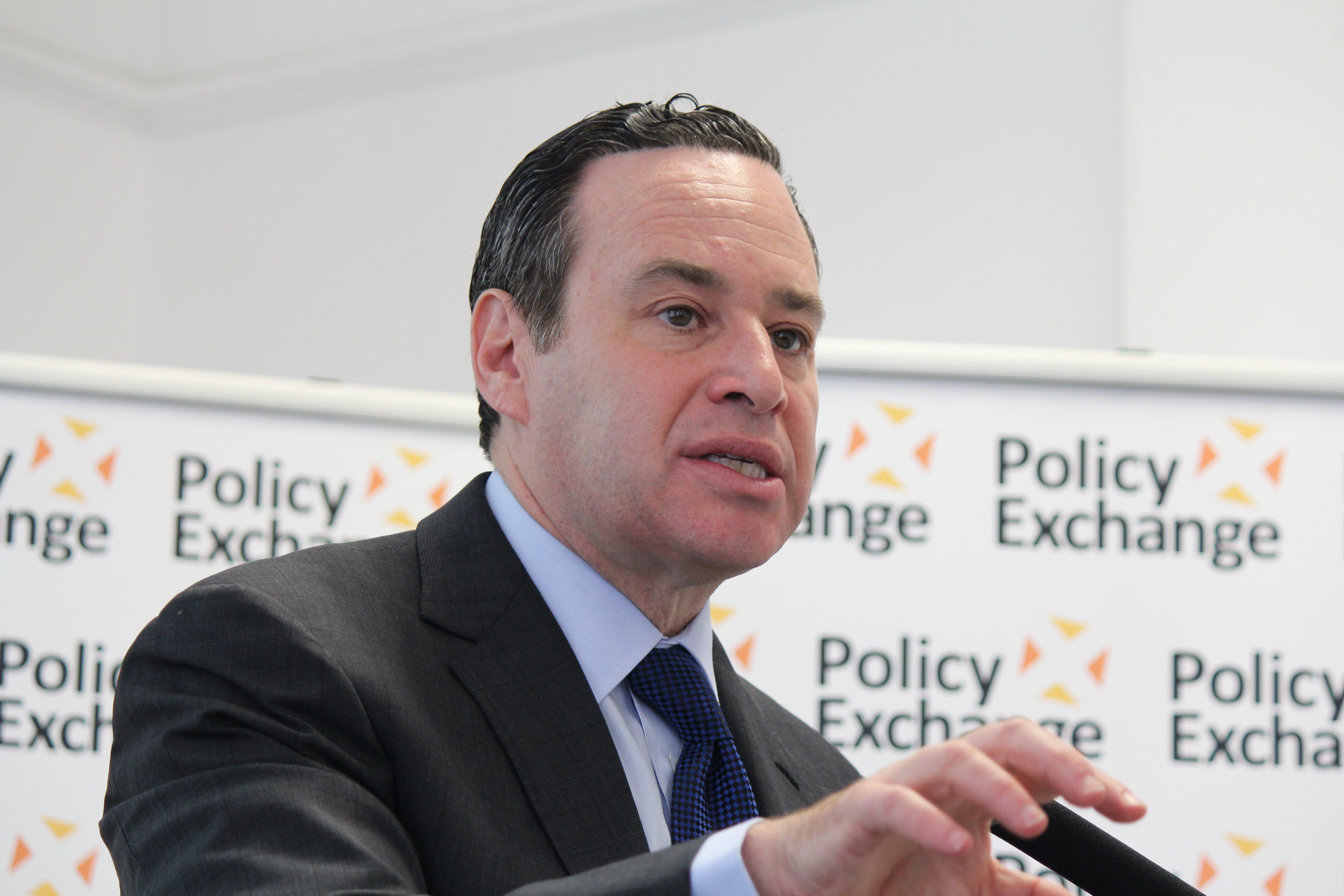
David Frum speaking to Policy Exchange in 2013

- Fred Barnes – co-founder and former executive editor of The Weekly Standard
- Robert Bartley – editor of the editorial page of The Wall Street Journal
- Max Boot – author, consultant, editorialist, lecturer, and military historian; formerly, publicly distanced himself and renounced Neoconservatism
- David Brooks – columnist
- Midge Decter – journalist, author †
- Jackson Diehl – deputy editorial page editor of The Washington Post
- Mark Dubowitz – CEO of the Foundation for Defense of Democracies

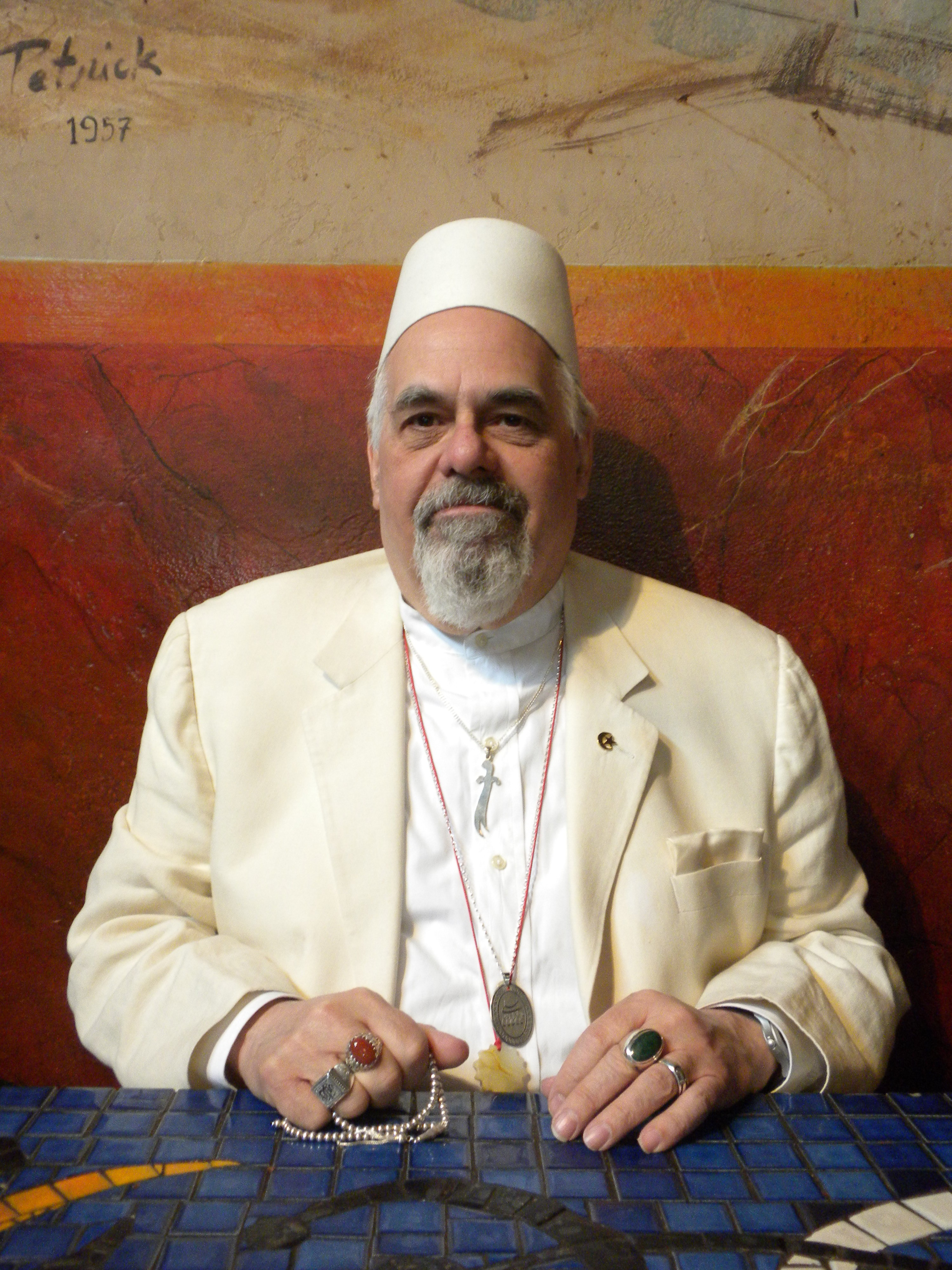
Lulu Schwartz

- Lulu Schwartz - American journalist, author and columnist who held a senior policy analyst role at Foundation for Defense of Democracies (FDD), a neo-conservative think tank based in Washington, D.C.
- Niall Ferguson
- Steve Forbes
- David Frum – journalist, Republican speechwriter and columnist
- Reuel Marc Gerecht – writer, political analyst and senior fellow at the Foundation for Defense of Democracies
- Carl Gershman, founding President of the National Endowment for Democracy
- Michael Gerson
- Jonah Goldberg – founding editor of The Dispatch
- Fred Hiatt – editorial page editor of The Washington Post
- David Horowitz
- Bruce P. Jackson – activist, former U.S. military intelligence officer
- Donald Kagan – Sterling Professor of Classics and History at Yale University †.
- Frederick Kagan – historian, resident scholar at the American Enterprise Institute
- Robert Kagan – senior fellow at the Brookings Institution, scholar of U.S. foreign policy, founder of the Yale Political Monthly, adviser to Republican political campaigns and one of 25 members of an advisory board to Hillary Clinton at the State Department (Kagan calls himself a "liberal interventionist" rather than "neoconservative")
- Charles Krauthammer – Pulitzer Prize winner, columnist and psychiatrist †
- Irving Kristol – publisher, journalist and columnist †
- Eli Lake – journalist and columnist
- Michael Ledeen – historian, foreign policy analyst, scholar at the American Enterprise Institute
- Clifford May – founder and president of the Foundation for Defense of Democracies
- Joshua Muravchik - political scholar
- Douglas Murray
- Michael Novak
- Marty Peretz
- Walid Phares
- Daniel Pipes
- Richard Pipes
- Danielle Pletka – American Enterprise Institute vice president
- John Podhoretz – editor of Commentary
- Norman Podhoretz – editor-in-chief of Commentary
- Yuval Levin – founding editor of National Affairs (2009–present) and director of Social, Cultural, and Constitutional Studies at the American Enterprise Institute.
- Harold Rhode
- Michael Rubin – resident scholar at the American Enterprise Institute
- Gary Schmitt – resident scholar at the American Enterprise Institute

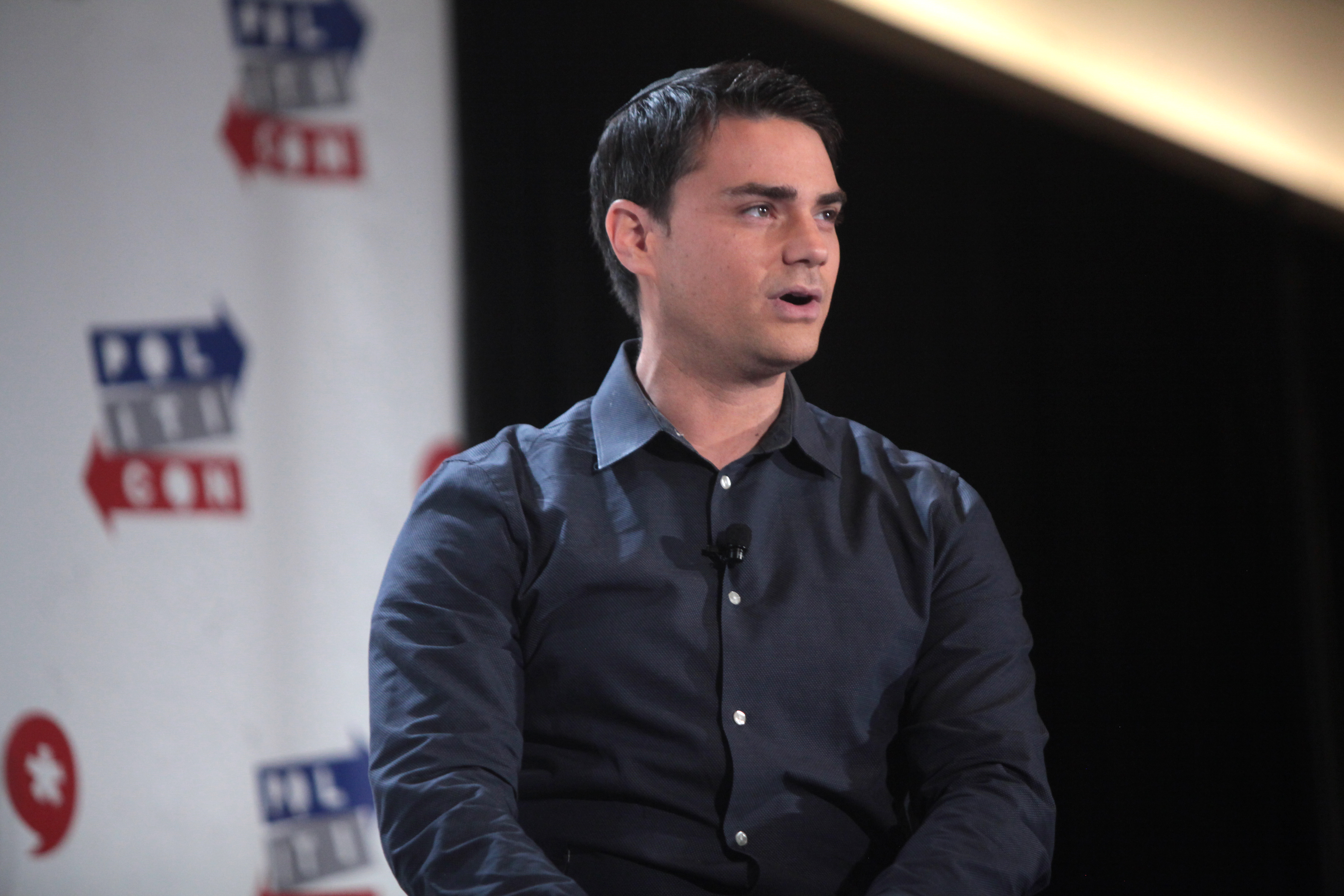
Ben Shapiro speaking at the 2016 Politicon at the Pasadena Convention Center in Pasadena, California

- Ben Shapiro – political commentator, public speaker, author, lawyer, founder and editor emeritus of The Daily Wire.
- Bret Stephens – journalist and columnist for The New York Times
- Irwin Stelzer – economist and writer
- Bari Weiss – editor of The Free Press
- Ruth Wisse
- David Wurmser – Research Fellow at the American Enterprise Institute
- Meyrav Wurmser – former Senior Fellow at the Hudson Institute; co-founder and Executive Director of the Middle East Media Research Institute

== Related publications and institutions ==
=== Institutions ===
- American Enterprise Institute
- Center for Security Policy
- Committee for the Free World
- Committee on the Present Danger
- Endowment for Middle East Truth
- Foundation for Defense of Democracies
- Henry Jackson Society
- Hudson Institute
- Jewish Institute for National Security of America
- Project for the New American Century
- The Washington Institute for Near East Policy
- United Against Nuclear Iran

=== Publications ===
- Commentary
- National Review (neoconservative opinion pieces)
- The Washington Free Beacon

=== Defunct publications ===
- The Public Interest (1965–2005)
- The Weekly Standard (1995–2018)

== See also ==
- Anti-Germans (political current)
- Criticism of Islamism
- Democratic peace theory
- Factions in the Republican Party (United States)
- Globalization
- Interventionism (politics)
- Jewish conservatism
- Liberal conservatism
- Liberal internationalism
- Neoliberalism
- Neo-libertarianism
- New Right in the United States
- Pro–Republic of China sentiment in the United States
- Team B
- United States militarism
- Views on military action against Iran

=== Other countries ===
- British neoconservatism
- Neoconservatism in Japan
- Neoconservatism in the Czech Republic
