= Meyrav Wurmser =

Israeli-American political scientist

- Born: Israel
- Known for: Co-founder of MEMRI
- Spouse: David Wurmser

Meyrav Wurmser is an Israeli-American neoconservative political executive.

== Biography ==
Meyrav Wurmser wrote her Ph.D. thesis on Revisionist Zionism behind the Herut and Likud parties, and received her doctorate in political science at George Washington University in 1998. She went on to teach political science at Johns Hopkins University and the US Naval Academy. She is married to Swiss-born American David Wurmser, former Middle East Adviser to US Vice President Dick Cheney.

== Academic career ==
She was formerly a Senior Fellow at the US think tank, the Hudson Institute.

From 1998 to 2001, Wurmser was a co-founder and Executive Director Middle East Media Research Institute (MEMRI) together with Yigal Carmon.

In 1996, Wurmser participated in a study that led to the report, A Clean Break: A New Strategy for Securing the Realm, a paper prepared for the Likud party leader and then incoming Israeli Prime Minister Benjamin Netanyahu, and suggested a new approach to solving Israel's security problems in the Middle East with an emphasis on "Western values" and the abandonment of traditional "land for peace" negotiations with the Palestinians. Other study participants included such prominent neoconservatives as Richard Perle, David Wurmser, and Douglas Feith.

In 2008, Wurmser was listed as a member of the board of advisors of the Endowment for Middle East Truth, a group which was involved in the distribution of 28 million DVDs of the film Obsession: Radical Islam's War Against the West in swing states prior to the 2008 US Presidential election.
