= War and Decision =

2008 memoir by Douglas Feith

War and Decision: Inside the Pentagon at the Dawn of the War on Terrorism
- Book cover
- Author: Douglas Feith
- Language: English
- Subject: United States Department of Defense
- Genre: Memoir
- Publisher: HarperCollins
- Publication date: April 8, 2008
- Publication place: United States
- Media type: Hardcover
- Pages: 688
- ISBN: 0-06-089973-5
- OCLC: 191731735

War and Decision: Inside the Pentagon at the Dawn of the War on Terrorism is a memoir written by Douglas Feith, former Undersecretary of Defense for Policy, in which he presents a history of the beginning of the war on terrorism and the campaigns in Afghanistan and Iraq. The book was released on April 8, 2008. In addition to its narrative, which largely details the period from summer 2001 until June 2004, the book contains a 30-page appendix with facsimiles of United States government memos and other documents from the period.

CBS' 60 Minutes interviewed Feith about the book on April 6. Feith is "donating all his proceeds to a foundation he has created to benefit veterans and their families."

== Critical reception ==
- Henry Kissinger, former National Security Advisor and Secretary of State, wrote that Feith's book is "The fullest and most thoughtful statement of the Pentagon thinking prior to and in the first stages of the Iraq war. Even those, as I, who take issue with some of its conclusions will gain a better perspective from reading this book."
- James Schlesinger, a Republican former Director of Central Intelligence and Secretary of Defense, wrote that "For anyone seriously interested in the decisions prior to and during the Iraq war, War and Decision is a must-read book. It is the first from within the Department of Defense, and Feith provides careful documentation rather than just freewheeling opinions. He explodes many of the journalistic and political myths that have become widely accepted. He provides a spirited defense of the President’s decisions, though the subsequent discussion makes clear the failures in execution. His judgments are thoughtful—and, for a major player in the process, he is quite objective regarding what went wrong. War and Decision will be a treasure trove for the historians—when the current passions have finally cooled."
- Jean Edward Smith, historian and author, wrote that "Douglas Feith has written a model memoir: fair-minded, objective, and without rancor. The fact that the policy to which he contributed was flawed from the outset in no way diminishes the historical importance of this firsthand account."
- Robert Gallucci, former Assistant Secretary of State and Dean of the Foreign Service School at Georgetown University, wrote that: "Douglas Feith has written what will be a controversial book. It will certainly anger many readers because it takes a different position than most other accounts on the wisdom of going to war in Iraq, on what mistakes were made, and on who made them. But Feith’s is a serious work, well documented, that presents the best defense to date of the defining policy of the Bush presidency. It is a readable account that deserves to be read and its argument debated."
- Fred Ikle, of the Center for Strategic and International Studies and a former Under Secretary of Defense for Policy in the Reagan administration, said of Feith's book that: "It’s easy to criticize mistakes from hindsight. It’s much harder to walk the reader through a labyrinth of decisionmaking in a divided government, especially a divided government presided over by an intermittently inattentive commander-in-chief. And it’s harder still to do this with a sense of loyalty and decency and respect toward the senior officials who invited you to serve in this government. Feith accomplished all of this with his book and much more."
- Ray Dubois, of the Center for Strategic and International Studies, and a Pentagon colleague of Feith's, said: "Were I to write my book of my Pentagon experiences, I would hope that I would be as even-handed and un-strident--I guess two words that are not often associated with Washington-- but I would hope to be as thorough as Doug has been. Not that we all agree with everything he said but one cannot disagree with the documentation, the thorough research, the rigorous scholarship, the documents that he cites that are printed, reprinted in his book. These and his contemporaneous notes clearly indicate a great deal of effort has gone into, as he will tell us, telling the truth."
- Christopher Hitchens called the book an "absorbing account of the interdepartmental and ideological quarrels within the Bush administration", and noted that "Feith has also done us the service of establishing a Web site where you can go and follow up all his sources and check them for yourself against his analysis and explanation". He also deplored the failure of major newspapers to mention the book, reporting that "the excellent James Risen" has written an article about it that the New York Times has never published.

== See also ==
- Iraq and weapons of mass destruction
- Iraq disarmament crisis
- Public relations preparations for 2003 invasion of Iraq
- Views on the 2003 invasion of Iraq
- Neoconservative
