= Robert Joseph (disambiguation) =

Robert Joseph is a scholar and professor at Missouri State University.

Robert Joseph may also refer to:

- Robert Joseph (wine connoisseur), British wine expert and writer
- Robert L. Joseph (1923–2002), American theater playwright
- Robbie Joseph (born 1982), West-Indian cricketer
- Robert Joseph (basketball) (born 1979), Haitian basketball player
