= William Schneider Jr. =

American civil servant (born 1941)

William J. Schneider Jr.
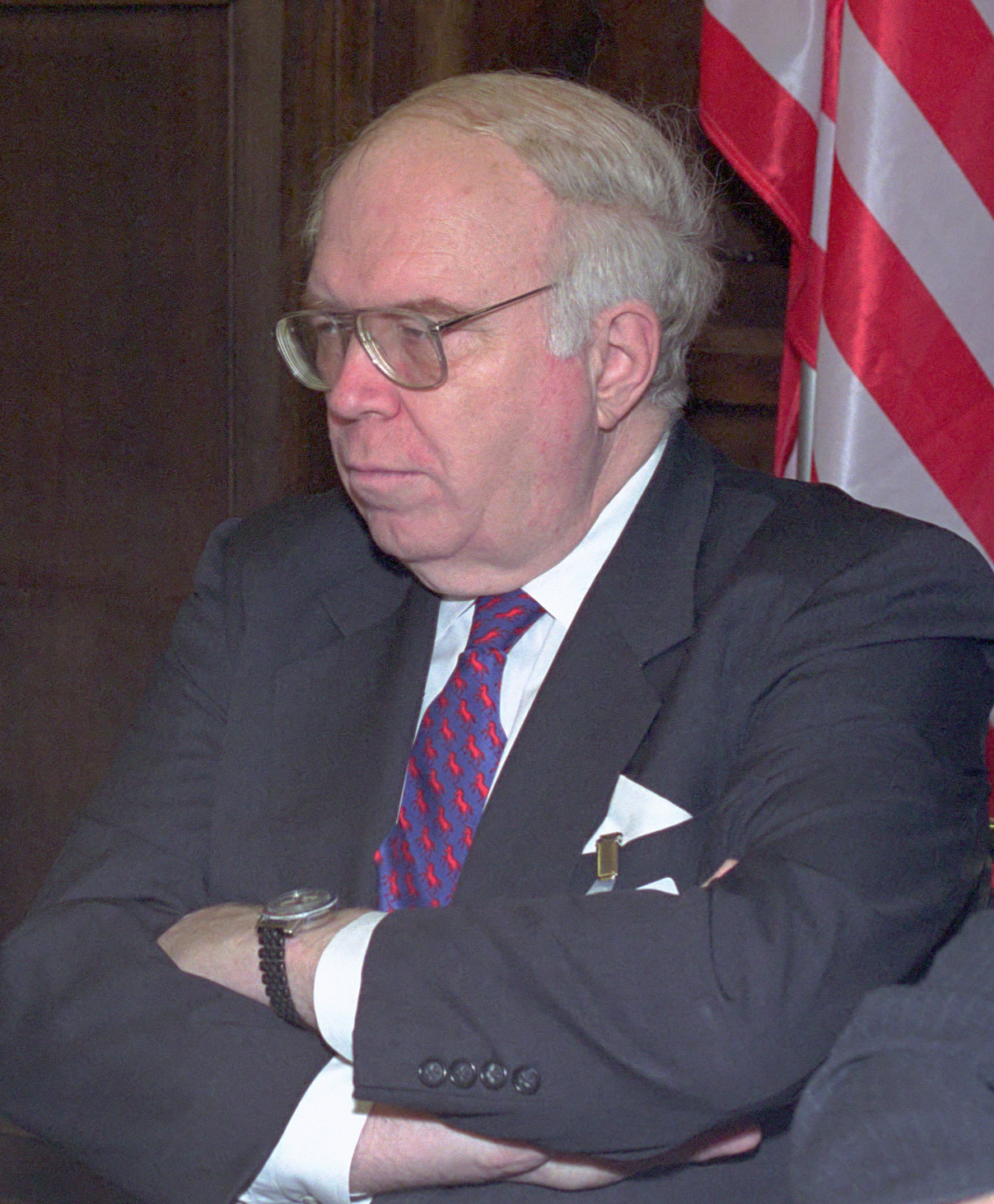
- Schneider in 2001

7th Under Secretary of State for International Security Affairs
- In office September 9, 1982 – October 31, 1986
- Preceded by: James L. Buckley
- Succeeded by: Ed Derwinski

Personal details
- Born: November 20, 1941 (age 84)

William J. Schneider Jr. (born November 20, 1941) is an American who has served in a number of federal government positions.

Schneider served as Under-Secretary of State in the Reagan administration, and later became a member of the Project for the New American Century (PNAC). He was one of the signers of the January 26, 1998, PNAC Letter sent to President Bill Clinton that encouraged an attack against Iraq. In that same year he served on the Commission to Assess the Ballistic Missile Threat to the United States, which concluded that Iraq could develop a ballistic missile capable of striking the US in ten years.

In January 2001, as President George W. Bush prepared to take office, Schneider served on a panel for nuclear weapons issues sponsored by the National Institute for Public Policy, a conservative think tank. Other members of the panel included Stephen Hadley, Stephen Cambone, and Robert Joseph, who were later appointed to senior positions in the Bush administration. This panel advocated using tactical nuclear weapons as a standard part of the United States defense arsenal.

In 2001 he was appointed by the US Senate to the Commission on the Future of the United States Aerospace Industry.

Schneider was selected by Donald Rumsfeld to chair the Defense Science Board. In this position, Schneider continued to advocate using nuclear weapons in certain limited first-strike situations.

Political offices
Preceded by James L. Buckley	Undersecretary of State for International Security Affairs; 1982–1986	Succeeded by Ed Derwinski
Government offices
Preceded by Craig I. Fields	Chairman of the Defense Science Board; 2001–2009	Succeeded by Paul G. Kaminski
