= A Clean Break: A New Strategy for Securing the Realm =

Policy report prepared for the Israeli prime minister in 1996

- Author: Richard Perle; James Colbert; Charles Fairbanks, Jr.; Douglas Feith; Robert Loewenberg; David Wurmser; Meyrav Wurmser
- Publisher: Institute for Advanced Strategic and Political Studies
- Publication date: June 1, 1996

A Clean Break: A New Strategy for Securing the Realm (commonly known as the Clean Break report) is a policy document that was prepared in 1996 by a study group led by Richard Perle for Benjamin Netanyahu, the then–prime minister of Israel. The report explained a new approach to solving Israel's security problems in the Middle East with an emphasis on Western values. It has since been criticized for advocating a policy of removing Saddam Hussein from power in Iraq, and the containment of Syria by engaging in proxy warfare and highlighting its possession of weapons of mass destruction. Certain parts of the policies set forth in the paper were rejected by Netanyahu; however, the report was ultimately adopted and serves as a foundation for modern-day Israeli global affairs.

== Report ==
According to the report's preamble, it was written by the Study Group on a New Israeli Strategy Toward 2000, which was a part of the Institute for Advanced Strategic and Political Studies.

Former United States assistant secretary of defense Richard Perle was the "Study Group Leader," but the final report included ideas from Douglas Feith, James Colbert, Charles Fairbanks Jr., Jonathan Torop, David Wurmser, Meyrav Wurmser, and IASPS president Robert Loewenberg.

== Influence ==
Certain aspects of the policies set forth in the "Clean Break" report were rejected by Netanyahu.

Brian Whitaker reported in a September 2002 article published in The Guardian that "With several of the Clean Break paper's authors now holding key positions in Washington, the plan for Israel to transcend its foes by reshaping the Middle East looks a good deal more achievable today than it did in 1996. Americans may even be persuaded to give up their lives to achieve it."

In March 2003, Patrick J. Buchanan, referring to the 2003 invasion of Iraq and the report, wrote, "Their plan, which urged Israel to re-establish 'the principle of preemption,' has now been imposed by Perle, Feith, Wurmser & Co. on the United States."

Ian Buruma wrote in August 2003 in The New York Times that:

Douglas Feith and Richard Perle advised Netanyahu, who was prime minister in 1996, to make "a clean break" from the Oslo accords with the Palestinians. They also argued that Israeli security would be served best by regime change in surrounding countries. Despite the current mess in Iraq, this is still a commonplace in Washington. In Paul Wolfowitz's words, "The road to peace in the Middle East goes through Baghdad." It has indeed become an article of faith (literally in some cases) in Washington that American and Israeli interests are identical, but this was not always so, and "Jewish interests" are not the main reason for it now.

Buruma continues:

What we see, then, is not a Jewish conspiracy, but a peculiar alliance of evangelical Christians, foreign-policy hard-liners, lobbyists for the Israeli government and neoconservatives, a number of whom happen to be Jewish. But the Jews among them—Perle, Wolfowitz, William Kristol, editor of The Weekly Standard, et al.—are more likely to speak about freedom and democracy than about Halakha (Jewish law). What unites this alliance of convenience is a shared vision of American destiny and the conviction that American force and a tough Israeli line on the Arabs are the best ways to make the United States strong, Israel safe and the world a better place.

In 2005, David Martin, a CBS News National Security Correspondent, said in regards to the decision-making process that led to the war in Iraq that he "never saw any evidence that Richard Perle had any determining effect on US policy. He just wasn't in a position to do so."

George Packer, in his 2005 non-fiction analysis of the Iraq war The Assassins' Gate, explicates the Clean Break report "through the lens of Wurmser's subsequent AEI-published volume, which argued (in 1999) that America's taking out Saddam would solve Israel's strategic problems and leave the Palestinians essentially helpless."

In 2006, commentator Karen Kwiatkowski pointed to the similarities between the proposed actions in the Clean Break document and the subsequent 2003 invasion of Iraq. Soon after Phyllis Bennis pointed to the similarities between the proposals in the Clean Break document and the subsequent 2006 Lebanon War.

In 2006, Sidney Blumenthal noted the paper's relevance to potential Israeli bombing of Syria and Iran, writing that "In order to try to understand the neoconservative road map, senior national security professionals have begun circulating among themselves" the Clean Break "neocon manifesto." Soon afterward, Taki Theodoracopoulos of The American Conservative wrote that:

...recently, Netanyahu suggested that President Bush had assured him Iran will be prevented from going nuclear. I take him at his word. Netanyahu seems to be the main mover in America's official adoption of the 1996 white paper A Clean Break, authored by him and American fellow neocons, which aimed to aggressively remake the strategic environments of Iraq, Palestine, Lebanon, Syria, and Iran. As they say in boxing circles, three down, two to go.

== Analysis ==
Jason Vest wrote that the report was "a kind of US-Israeli neoconservative manifesto" and that it proposed "a mini-cold war in the Middle East, advocating the use of proxy armies for regime changes, destabilization and containment. Indeed, it even goes so far as to articulate a way to advance right-wing Zionism by melding it with missile-defense advocacy." He wrote that because of the shared organizational membership of the paper's authors the report provides "perhaps the most insightful window" into the "policy worldview" of the Jewish Institute for National Security Affairs and Center for Security Policy, two United States-based thinktanks.

An October 2003 editorial in The Nation criticized the Syria Accountability Act and connected it to the Clean Break report and authors:

To properly understand the Syria Accountability Act, one has to go back to a 1996 document, "A Clean Break: A New Strategy for Securing the Realm," drafted by a team of advisers to Benjamin Netanyahu in his run for prime minister of Israel. The authors included current Bush advisers Richard Perle and Douglas Feith. "Syria challenges Israel on Lebanese soil," they wrote, calling for "striking Syrian military targets in Lebanon, and should that prove insufficient, striking at select targets in Syria proper." No wonder Perle was delighted by the Israeli strike. "It will help the peace process," he told The Washington Post, adding later that the United States itself might have to attack Syria.

But what Perle means by "helping the peace process" is not resolving the conflict by bringing about a viable, sovereign Palestinian state but rather, as underscored in A Clean Break, "transcending the Arab-Israeli conflict" altogether by forcing the Arabs to accept most, if not all, of Israel's territorial conquests and its nuclear hegemony in the region.

John Dizard claimed there is evidence in the Clean Break document of Ahmed Chalabi's involvement. Chalabi, an Iraqi politician, was an ardent opponent of Saddam Hussein:

In the section on Iraq, and the necessity of removing Saddam Hussein, there was telltale "intelligence" from Chalabi and his old Jordanian Hashemite patron, Prince Hassan: "The predominantly Shi'a population of southern Lebanon has been tied for centuries to the Shi'a leadership in Najaf, Iraq, rather than Iran. Were the Hashemites to control Iraq, they could use their influence over Najaf to help Israel wean the south Lebanese Shi'a away from Hizbollah, Iran, and Syria. Shi'a retain strong ties to the Hashemites." Of course the Shia with "strong ties to the Hashemites" was the family of Ahmed Chalabi. Perle, Feith and other contributors to the "Clean Break" seemed not to recall the 15-year fatwa the clerics of Najaf proclaimed against the Iraqi Hashemites. Or the still more glaring fact, pointed out by Rashid Khalidi in his new book Resurrecting Empire, that Shiites are loyal only to descendants of the prophet Muhammad's son-in-law, Ali, and reject all other lineages, including the Hashemites. As Khalidi caustically notes, "Perle and his colleagues were here proposing the complete restructuring of a region whose history and religion their suggestions reveal they know hardly anything about." In short, the Iraqi component of the neocons "new strategy" was based on an ignorant fantasy of prospective Shia support for ties with Israel.

Professors John Mearsheimer and Stephen Walt wrote in their controversial and critical "The Israel Lobby" article of March 2006, published in the London Review of Books that the Clean Break paper:

...called for Israel to take steps to reorder the entire Middle East. Netanyahu did not follow their advice, but Feith, Perle and Wurmser were soon urging the Bush administration to pursue those same goals. The Ha’aretz columnist Akiva Eldar warned that Feith and Perle "are walking a fine line between their loyalty to American governments ... and Israeli interests".

Sidney Blumenthal criticized the report, writing:

Instead of trading land for peace, the neocons advocated tossing aside the Oslo agreements that established negotiations and demanding unconditional Palestinian acceptance of Likud's terms, peace for peace. Rather than negotiations with Syria, they proposed weakening, containing, and even rolling back Syria. They also advanced a wild scenario to redefine Iraq. Then King Hussein of Jordan would somehow become its ruler; and somehow this Sunni monarch would gain control of the Iraqi Shiites, and through them wean the south Lebanese Shia away from Hezbollah, Iran, and Syria.
