= Rumsfeld Commission =

1998 commission created by US Congress

The Commission to Assess the Ballistic Missile Threat to the United States, commonly called the Rumsfeld Commission, was an independent commission formed by the US Congress to evaluate the ballistic missile threat posed to the United States.

The group began work in January 1998 and issued their unanimous final report on July 15, 1998, within the six-month mandate. The report warned of a growing threat of ballistic missiles and the inability for US intelligence to keep track of developments. This contrasted with the views of previous US intelligence estimates, which stated that the threat of ballistic missiles was still 10 to 20 years away. The commission further fueled the debate over a national missile defense system, and may have contributed to the coining of the phrase axis of evil.

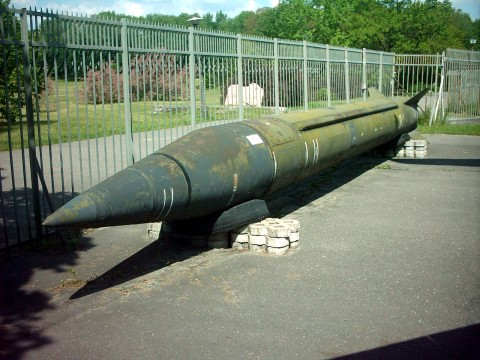
The use of Scud missile designs for future long-range weapons was a primary concern of the commission.

== Background ==
The argument for a national missile defense system in the United States was traditionally to protect the country from a Soviet missile attack. With the fall of the Soviet Union in 1991, proponents of a missile defense shield began instead to focus on the risk posed by rogue states developing ballistic missiles capable of eventually reaching the US.

This case was blunted by a 1995 National Intelligence Estimate (NIE), which stated that no country besides the five major nuclear powers was capable of acquiring missiles that could reach Canada or the contiguous United States within the ensuing 15 years. Republican lawmakers intent on funding a defensive shield criticized the report and the Clinton administration for inaccurate assessments and distorted intelligence. Republican Congressman Curt Weldon of Pennsylvania walked out of a CIA briefing on the NIE, and later said that it was "the most outrageous politicisation of an intelligence document that I've seen in the 10 years I've been in Washington."

From February to May 1996, the House National Security Committee held hearings on the ballistic missile threat, and in a final report recommended that two reviews be created: one to investigate the NIE itself, and another to complete a new investigation of the ballistic missile threat. This process was also highly politicized, and the ranking Democrat on the committee, California Congressman Ronald Dellums, accused it of relying far too heavily on outside experts. Many of the witnesses called before the committee were in fact strong proponents of missile defense. The first review was conducted by former Director of Central Intelligence (DCI) and future Defense Secretary Robert Gates. He concluded that while there was evidence of faulty methodology in the NIE, there was no political bias in its conclusions. This conclusion again angered the missile defense supporters who had counted on this review to further their arguments.

== Commission history ==
The second review was to be conducted by an outside commission, although it took lawmakers, until 1997 to agree upon the commission's membership. The commission eventually began to meet in mid-January 1998 in the Old Executive Office Building and under the chairmanship of the once and future Secretary of Defense, Donald Rumsfeld. Although the commission was not formed to investigate the feasibility of a national missile defense shield, the reality that their conclusions would influence that debate led many in Washington to doubt that a unanimous conclusion was possible. Rumsfeld still wished to reach a consensus, and instituted a policy whereby any noted objection in the report needed to have the support of at least two commissioners.

The first weeks of deliberations and testimonies gleaned little new information on the threat being investigated, so in mid-February, with their mandate supposedly giving them access to all necessary information from the executive branch, the commission complained in person to then DCI George Tenet. From that point on, the commission gained much greater access to the information and personnel of the US intelligence community.

The commission continued briefings until mid-July 1998. During that time they were frustrated by the compartmentalization of intelligence, the refusal of analysts to speculate or hypothesize on given information, and what they considered general inexperience in the intelligence personnel. The group did not limit their interviews to members of the government, but also spoke with employees of Boeing and Lockheed Martin, especially about how Scud missile designs could be used as the basis for a long-range ballistic missile program.

== Conclusions ==
There were two final reports of the commission: a 300-page classified report for Congress and a 27-page unclassified report. In the unclassified version, the group came to four unanimous conclusions:

- The US is threatened by ballistic missiles tipped with biological or nuclear payloads from China, Russia, Iran, Iraq, and North Korea. Iran and North Korea could develop the capability to strike the US within five years of a decision to pursue ballistic missile technology; Iraq would require ten years.
- The US intelligence community has underestimated these growing threats.
- The processes of the intelligence community to make estimates on this threat are causing an erosion of accurate assessments.
- The US has a diminishing warning time before missile systems are operationally deployed, and may conceivably have no warning in the future.

== Aftermath ==
=== Immediate ===
The findings of the commission generated mixed reactions among lawmakers, intelligence officers, and experts. The intelligence community was privately angered by the harsh language the report used to describe their own assessments of the threat, although CIA Director George Tenet did not openly criticize it in public. Congressional proponents of a national missile shield, especially Republicans, used the findings to further push their case that such a shield was necessary. However, some experts in and out of government questioned the usefulness of the report, saying that it made general speculations without reaching any definite conclusions. Whereas the intelligence estimate focused on what was actually occurring, the commission focused on what might occur. This was labeled in one article "'hypothesis-based' threat assessment".

Many observers took a moderate tone in their reaction, acknowledging that funding should be provided for further national missile defense tests, but also saying that the US should not rush into developing technology that might prove ineffective and too costly.

Within months of the final report several events occurred which to some supporters reinforced the commission's conclusions. In late July, Iran tested for the first time its new Shahab-3 missile, which traveled 620 miles (1,000 km) before exploding. Its basic design was modeled on the North Korean Rodong-1. North Korea launched what it described as a three-stage satellite launch on August 31 of that year, a surprise for US intelligence, which had expected a test of the two-stage Taepodong-1 (partially based on the Scud). While the third stage failed, it was nonetheless a major development in that introduced stage separation and solid fuel in North Korean rocketry.

=== George W. Bush administration ===
The commission reentered the public consciousness in 2000 when the former chairman of the commission, Donald Rumsfeld, was named by newly elected President George W. Bush to be Secretary of Defense, his second time in that office. On December 30, 2000, Richard Garwin, a former commissioner, praised Rumsfeld for his commission work in a New York Times op-ed piece, although he reiterated that the commission never suggested whether or not the US should build a missile defense system. Other staffers and members of the commission were also appointed by the new Bush administration: Paul Wolfowitz was named Deputy Secretary of Defense, William Schneider, Jr. was appointed by Rumsfeld to the Defense Science Board, and in March 2003 Stephen Cambone was selected by Rumsfeld to fill the newly created Under Secretary of Defense for Intelligence position. Robert Gates, the man who conducted the first review of the ballistic missile threat, was appointed Secretary of Defense after Rumsfeld's November 2006 resignation.

The commission is thought by some foreign policy analysts to be the basis for President George W. Bush's axis of evil line in his 2002 State of the Union Address, in which he accused Iraq, Iran, and North Korea of being state sponsors of terrorism and of pursuing weapons of mass destruction. The Rumsfeld Commission grouped the three countries together because they all were believed to be pursuing ballistic missile programs based on the Scud missile. In the pre-9/11 days of the Bush presidency, the administration had focused heavily on developing a national missile defense system to counter such threats. A month after the address, former Speaker of the House Newt Gingrich, who appointed Rumsfeld as head of the commission, mentioned the importance of the commission's findings in relation to the US ability to predict the threat posed by the axis members.

== Participants ==
The commission was chaired by former Secretary of Defense and Republican Donald Rumsfeld, and included the following members:

=== Republicans ===
- William Graham
- William Schneider, Jr.
- General Larry Welch, US Air Force Ret.
- Paul Wolfowitz
- James Woolsey

=== Democrats ===
- Barry Blechman
- George Lee Butler
- Richard Garwin

=== Core Staff ===
- Stephen Cambone
- Steven Maaranen
- Eric Desautels
- David Dunham
- Jason Roback
- Bernard Victory
- Delonnie Henry

== See also ==
- Intercontinental ballistic missile
- Intermediate-range ballistic missile
- Short-range ballistic missile
- Tactical ballistic missile
- Nuclear weapons delivery
- Anti-ballistic missile
