= Douglas Feith =

American political official (born 1953)

Doug Feith
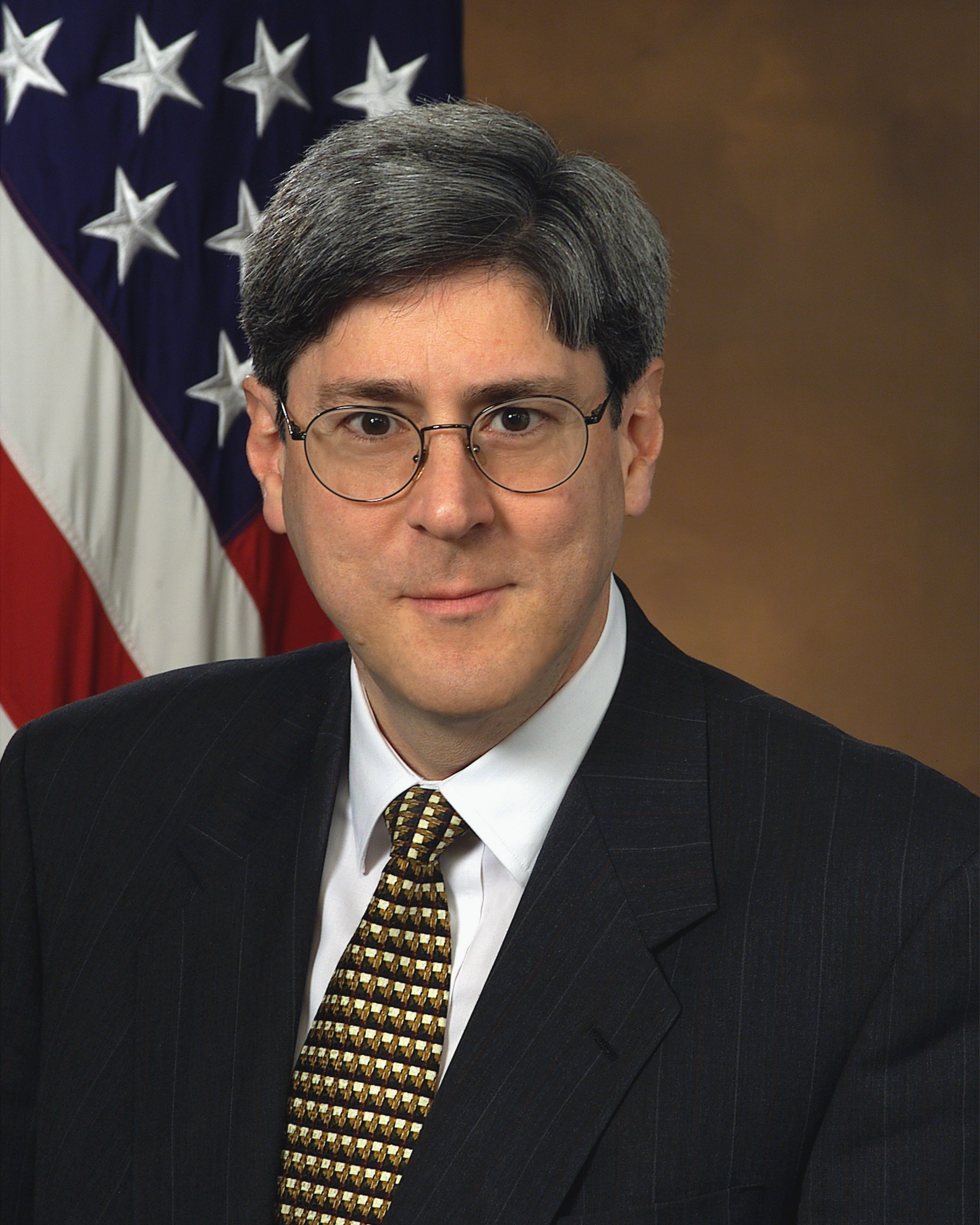
- Official portrait, 2001

Under Secretary of Defense for Policy
- In office July 16, 2001 – August 8, 2005
- President: George W. Bush
- Preceded by: Walter B. Slocombe
- Succeeded by: Eric S. Edelman

Personal details
- Born: July 16, 1953 (age 73) Philadelphia, Pennsylvania, U.S.
- Party: Republican
- Education: Harvard University (BA); Georgetown University (JD)

Douglas Jay Feith (/ˈfaɪθ/; born July 16, 1953) is an American lawyer who served as Under Secretary of Defense for Policy from July 2001 until August 2005. He is a senior fellow at the Hudson Institute, a conservative think tank.

Feith has been described as an architect of the Iraq War. In the lead up to the war, he played a key role in promoting the false claim that the Saddam Hussein regime had an operational relationship with al-Qaeda (even though there was scant credible evidence of such a relationship at the time). A Pentagon Inspector General report found that Feith's office had "developed, produced, and then disseminated alternative intelligence assessments on the Iraq and al Qaida relationship, which included some conclusions that were inconsistent with the consensus of the Intelligence Community, to senior decision-makers."

== Personal life ==
Feith was born to a Jewish family in Philadelphia, Pennsylvania, one of three children of Rose (née Bankel) and Dalck Feith. His father was a member of the Betar, a Revisionist Zionist youth organization, in Poland, and a Holocaust survivor who lost his parents and seven siblings in the Nazi concentration camps. Dalck came to the United States during World War II and became a businessman, a philanthropist, and a donor to the Republican party.

Feith grew up in Elkins Park, part of Cheltenham Township, a Philadelphia suburb. He attended Philadelphia's Central High School, and later attended Harvard University, where he obtained his undergraduate degree and graduated magna cum laude in 1975. He continued on to the Georgetown University Law Center, receiving his J.D. magna cum laude in 1978. After graduation, he worked for three years as an attorney with the law firm Fried, Frank, Harris, Shriver & Jacobson LLP.

== Career ==
=== Work as a Democrat ===
Feith worked on the staff of senator Henry M. Jackson in 1975 before going on to work on Elmo Zumwalt's campaign against segregationist senator Harry Byrd, Jr. Byrd, an independent since 1970, defeated Zumwalt, a Democrat, 57–38%.

=== Reagan administration ===
At Harvard, Feith had studied under Richard Pipes, who joined the Reagan administration's National Security Council, in 1981, to help carry out a private intelligence project called Team B that Pipes and his students had conceived. Feith joined the NSC as a Middle East specialist that same year, working under Pipes.

He transferred from the NSC staff to the Pentagon, in 1982, to work as special counsel for Richard Perle, who was then serving as assistant secretary to the United States Secretary of Defense. Secretary of Defense Caspar Weinberger promoted Feith, in 1984, to deputy assistant secretary of defense for negotiations policy. When Feith left the Pentagon, in 1986, Weinberger awarded him the Department of Defense Medal for Distinguished Public Service, the department's highest civilian award.

During his time in the Pentagon in the Reagan administration, Feith helped to convince the Joint Chiefs of Staff, Weinberger and Secretary of State George Shultz all to recommend against ratification of changes to the Geneva Conventions. The changes, known as the "Additional Protocols," grant armed non-state actors prisoner of war status under certain circumstances even if they fail to distinguish themselves from the civilian population to the same extent as members of the armed forces of a high contracting party. Reagan informed the United States Senate in 1987 that he would not ratify Additional Protocol I. At the time, both The Washington Post and The New York Times editorialized in favor of Reagan's decision to reject Additional Protocol I as a revision of humanitarian law that protected terrorists.

=== Private practice ===
Feith began his career as an attorney in private practice with the law firm Fried, Frank, Harris, Shriver & Jacobson LLP for 3 years, after which he joined the Reagan administration (see the previous section).

Upon leaving the Pentagon, Feith co-founded, with Marc Zell, the Washington, DC law firm of Feith & Zell. The firm engaged in lobbying efforts for, among others, the Turkish, Israeli and Bosnian governments, in addition to representing defense corporations Lockheed Martin and Northrop Grumman. Feith left the firm in 2001, following his nomination as Undersecretary of Defense for Policy.

=== Bush administration ===
Feith joined the administration of President George W. Bush as Undersecretary of Defense for Policy in 2001. His appointment was facilitated by connections he had with other neoconservatives, including Richard Perle and Paul Wolfowitz. With his new appointment in hand, Feith proved influential in having Richard Perle chosen as chairman of the Defense Policy Board. Feith was criticized during the first term of the Bush administration for creating the Office of Strategic Influence. This office came into existence to support the war on terror. The office's aim was to conduct non-covert influence operations in foreign countries. However, after significant media scrutiny into what exactly would fall within the OSI's mandate, Defense Secretary Donald Rumsfeld had Feith shut the office down, while transferring its functions elsewhere within the Department of Defense. Feith played a significant role in the buildup to the Iraq War. Feith has been characterized as an architect of the Iraq War.

As part of his portfolio, he supervised the Pentagon Office of Special Plans, a group of policy and intelligence analysts created to provide senior government officials with raw intelligence, unvetted by the intelligence community. The office was responsible for hiring Lawrence Franklin, who was later convicted along with AIPAC employees Steven J. Rosen and Keith Weissman for passing classified national defense information to an Israeli diplomat Naor Gilon. The office, eventually dismantled, was later criticized in Congress and the media for analysis that was contradicted by CIA analysis and investigations performed following the invasion of Iraq. In response to the allegedly poor work of Feith's Office of Special Plans, General Tommy Franks, who led both the 2001 invasion of Afghanistan and the Iraq War called Feith "the dumbest fucking guy on the planet".

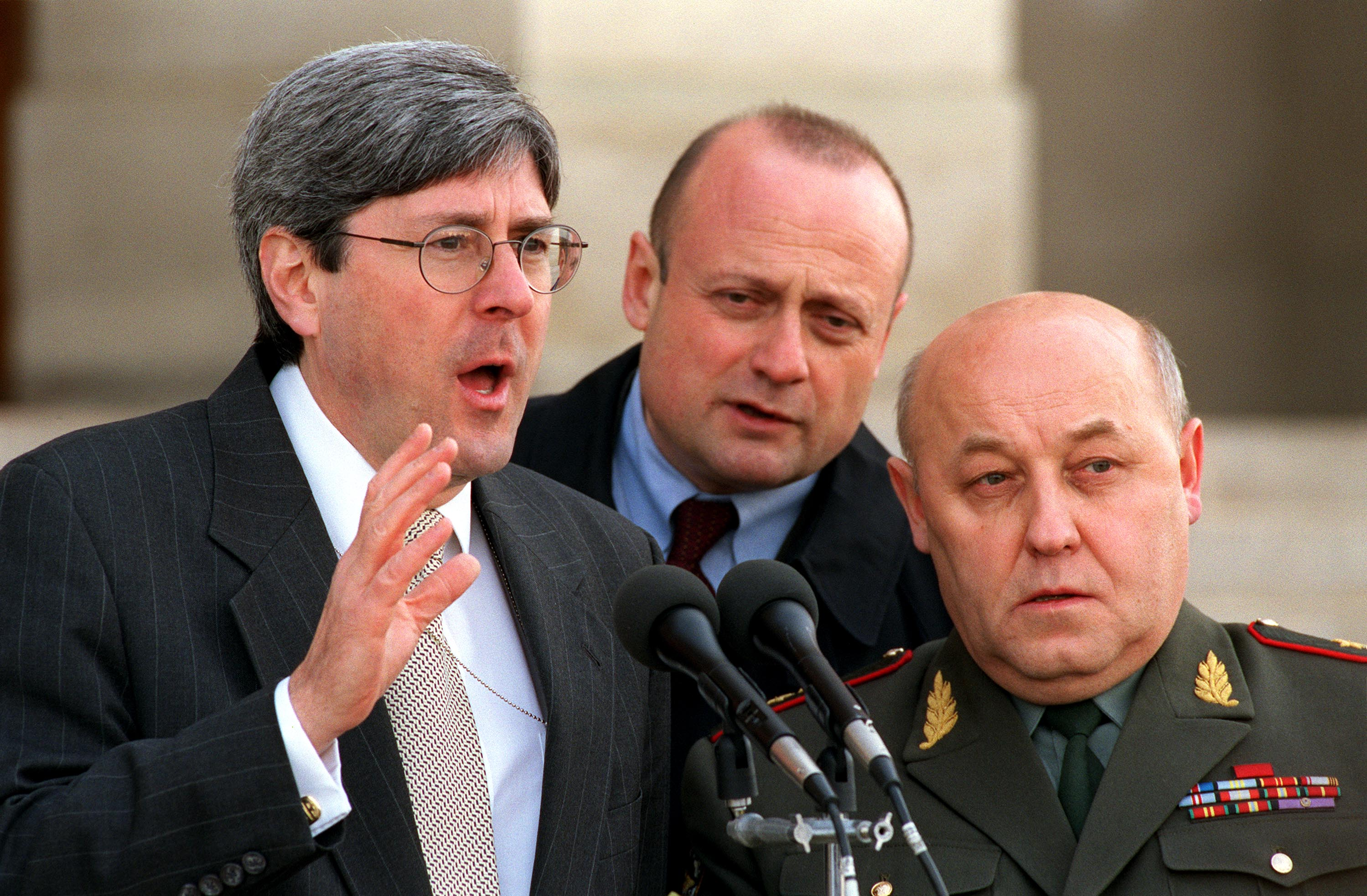
Douglas Feith and General-Colonel Yuriy Nikolayevich Baluyevskiy hold a joint press conference at the Pentagon on Jan. 16, 2002.

Feith was responsible for the de-Ba'athification policy promulgated in Coalition Provisional Authority (CPA) Order 1 which entered into force on 16 May 2003.

In February 2007, the Pentagon's inspector general issued a report that concluded that Feith's office "developed, produced, and then disseminated alternative intelligence assessments on the Iraq and al-Qaeda relationship, which included some conclusions that were inconsistent with the consensus of the Intelligence Community, to senior decision-makers." This repeated Feith's earlier involvement with Team B as a postgraduate, when alternative intelligence assessments exaggerating threats to the United States turned out to be wrong on nearly every point. The report found that these actions were "inappropriate" though not "illegal." Senator Carl Levin, Chair of the Senate Armed Services Committee, stated that "The bottom line is that intelligence relating to the Iraq-al-Qaeda relationship was manipulated by high-ranking officials in the Department of Defense to support the administration's decision to invade Iraq. The inspector general's report is a devastating condemnation of inappropriate activities in the DOD policy office that helped take this nation to war." At Senator Levin's insistence, on April 6, 2007, the Pentagon's Inspector General's Report was declassified and released to the public.

Responding to criticism of a report that linked Al-Qaeda with Iraq under Saddam Hussein, Feith called the office's report a much-needed critique of the CIA's intelligence. "It's healthy to criticize the CIA's intelligence", Feith said. "What the people in the Pentagon were doing was right. It was good government." Feith also rejected accusations he attempted to link Iraq to a formal relationship with Al Qaeda. "No one in my office ever claimed there was an operational relationship", Feith said. "There was a relationship." Feith stated that he "felt vindicated" by the report of the Pentagon inspector general. He told The Washington Post that his office produced "a criticism of the consensus of the intelligence community, and in presenting it I was not endorsing its substance."

Feith was the first senior Pentagon official to leave the administration after Bush was re-elected. There was some speculation when Feith announced he was leaving as to why he was stepping down. Some believed he was pressured to leave because of problems over his performance and his increasing marginalization.

=== Post-government career ===
Following his government service, Feith was employed by the Edmund A. Walsh School of Foreign Service at Georgetown University, where he taught a course on the Bush administration's anti-terrorism policy. He came to Georgetown's School of Foreign Service after leaving Stanford's Hoover Institution and was appointed by School of Foreign Service dean, Robert Gallucci. However, his hiring "caused an uproar among the Foreign Service school faculty." Two years later, Feith's contract was not renewed, causing continuing hostility between the Georgetown Law Center faculty and alumni and the Foreign Service school faculty.

In 2008, Feith became a senior fellow at Hudson Institute, where he is the director of its Center for National Security Strategies.

== Views and publications ==
Feith is a Republican, and has contributed money to various party candidates over the years. He has been described as a neoconservative. One of Feith's controversial views was his argument that increasing the number of political appointees equated to more democracy, which would help align government policy to the promises politicians make before they get into office.

Feith's writings have appeared in The Wall Street Journal, Commentary, and The New Republic. He has contributed chapters to a number of books, including James W. Muller's Churchill as Peacemaker, Raphael Israeli's The Dangers of a Palestinian State and Uri Ra'anan's Hydra of Carnage: International Linkages of Terrorism, as well as serving as co-editor for Israel's Legitimacy in Law and History.

Feith is an ardent supporter of Israel. Along with Richard Perle and David Wurmser, he was a member of the study group which authored a controversial report entitled A Clean Break: A New Strategy for Securing the Realm, a set of policy recommendations for the newly elected Israeli prime minister, Benjamin Netanyahu. The report was published by the Institute for Advanced Strategic and Political Studies without an individual author being named. According to the report, Feith was one of the people who participated in roundtable discussions that produced ideas that the report reflects. Feith pointed out in a September 16, 2004 letter to the editor of The Washington Post that he was not the co-author and did not clear the report's final text. He wrote, "There is no warrant for attributing any particular idea [in the report], let alone all of them, to any one participant."

Feith was on the board of the Jewish Institute for National Security Affairs (JINSA), a think tank that promotes a military and strategic alliance between the United States and Israel.

Feith was interviewed by the CBS news magazine 60 Minutes in a segment that was aired on April 6, 2008. During this interview he promoted his newly released memoir, War and Decision and defended the decision making that led to the US invasion of Iraq in 2003.

=== War and Decision ===
On April 8, 2008, Feith's memoir, War and Decision: Inside the Pentagon at the Dawn of the War on Terrorism, was published by HarperCollins.

== War crimes investigation ==
In 2009, Feith became one of several Bush administration officials under consideration for investigation of possible war crimes in a Spanish court, headed by Baltasar Garzón under claims of universal jurisdiction. The case had reportedly still been active as of 2011.

== Personal life ==
Feith is married with four children. His eldest son, Daniel Feith, graduated from Harvard College and Yale Law School and served as Deputy Assistant Attorney General for the Consumer Protection Branch in the United States Department of Justice. His second son, David Feith, graduated from Columbia University and worked as an editorial writer for The Wall Street Journal and an assistant editor at Foreign Affairs before serving as Deputy Assistant Secretary of State for East Asian and Pacific Affairs in the United States Department of State from July 2020 to January 2021 and at the United States National Security Council from January to April 2025.

== Footnotes ==
Government offices
Preceded by Walter B. Slocombe	United States Department of Defense; Under Secretary of Defense for Policy; 2001–2005	Succeeded by Eric S. Edelman
