= David Wurmser =

American foreign policy specialist

David Wurmser is an American foreign policy specialist. He served as Middle East Adviser to former US Vice President Dick Cheney, as special assistant to John R. Bolton at the State Department and as a research fellow on the Middle East at the American Enterprise Institute (AEI). He served in the U.S. Navy Reserve as an intelligence officer at the rank of Lieutenant Commander.

== Professional background ==
Wurmser was born in Switzerland. He has a Ph.D. in international relations from Johns Hopkins University and the title of his 1989 dissertation was "The evolution of Israeli grand strategy, strategy and tactics and the confluence with classic democratic philosophy." In 2008, Wurmser was listed as a member of the board of advisors of the Endowment for Middle East Truth, a group which was involved in the distribution of over 20 million DVDs of the film Obsession in swing states prior to the 2008 US presidential election. Wurmser is the founder of the Delphi Global Analysis Group.

== Writings ==
Wurmser has been credited as being one of the main authors of the 1996 report A Clean Break: A New Strategy for Securing the Realm, a paper prepared for incoming Israeli Prime Minister Binyamin Netanyahu. This advocated pre-emptive strikes against Iran and Syria, the removal of Saddam Hussein from Iraq and the abandonment of traditional "land for peace" negotiations with Palestinians.

In 1999, Wurmser wrote Tyranny's Ally: America's Failure to Defeat Saddam Hussein (published by AEI Press), which argued that President Clinton's policies in Iraq were failing to contain the country.

In 2000, Wurmser helped draft a document entitled "Ending Syria's Occupation of Lebanon: The US Role?", which called for a confrontation with the regime in Damascus. The document said that Syria was developing "weapons of mass destruction".

After the attacks of September 11, 2001, Undersecretary of Defense Douglas Feith appointed Wurmser and veteran defense analyst Michael Maloof as a two-man Pentagon intelligence unit. One of their products, days after the attacks, was a memo that suggested "hitting targets outside the Middle East in the initial offensive" or a "non-Al Qaeda target like Iraq." In the memo, U.S. attacks in Latin America and Southeast Asia were portrayed as a way to catch terrorists off guard when they were expecting an assault on Afghanistan. Wurmser and Maloof arguably contributed to the war on terror by sifting through top secret daily intelligence documents for a link between Al Qaeda and Iraqi government leadership. Maloof and Wurmser gave their findings to the Bush administration, which used them to claim that Saddam Hussein had weapons of mass destruction and ties to terrorism. Neither claim has shown to be true, per the Senate Report on Pre-war Intelligence on Iraq.

On September 4, 2004, The Washington Post reported that FBI counterintelligence investigators had questioned Wurmser, along with Feith, Harold Rhode, and Paul Wolfowitz about the passing of classified information to Ahmad Chalabi and/or the American Israel Public Affairs Committee.

In September 2007, Newsweek and Reuters reported that "David Wurmser told a small group several months ago that Vice President Dick Cheney was considering asking Israel to strike the Iranian nuclear site at Natanz." Meyrav Wurmser, Wurmser's wife, "told Newsweek the claims were untrue."

== Personal life ==
Wurmser's wife, Dr. Meyrav Wurmser, co-founded the Middle East Media Research Institute (MEMRI).
