= Stephen Cambone =

American politician (born 1952)

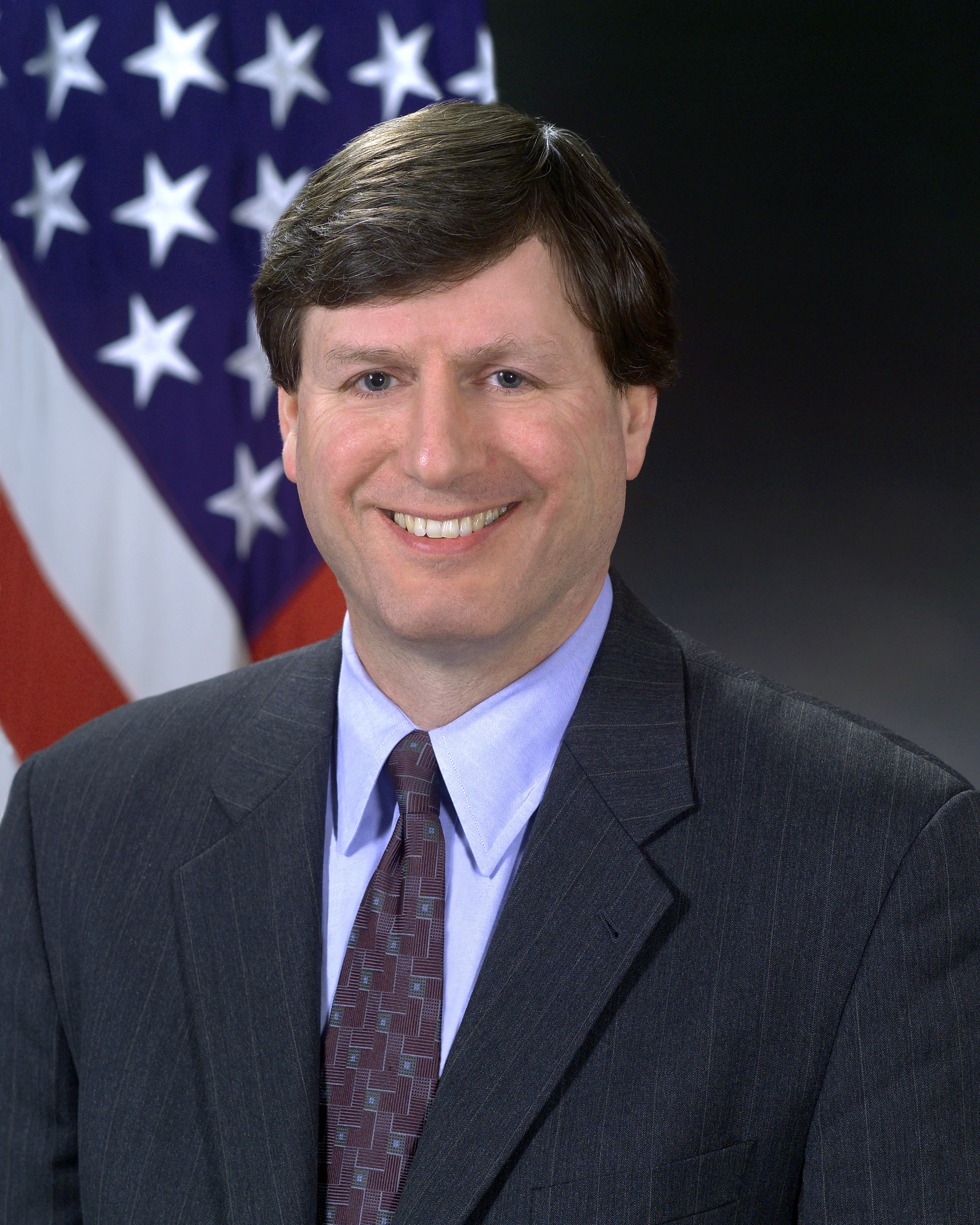
- Official portrait, 2003

Under Secretary of Defense for Intelligence
- In office March 1, 2003 – December 31, 2006
- President: George W. Bush
- Preceded by: Position established
- Succeeded by: James R. Clapper

Personal details
- Born: June 22, 1952 (age 74) The Bronx, New York, U.S.
- Party: Republican
- Spouse: Margaret Taaffe Cambone
- Children: Maria
- Education: Catholic University of America (BA); Claremont Graduate University (MA, PhD)

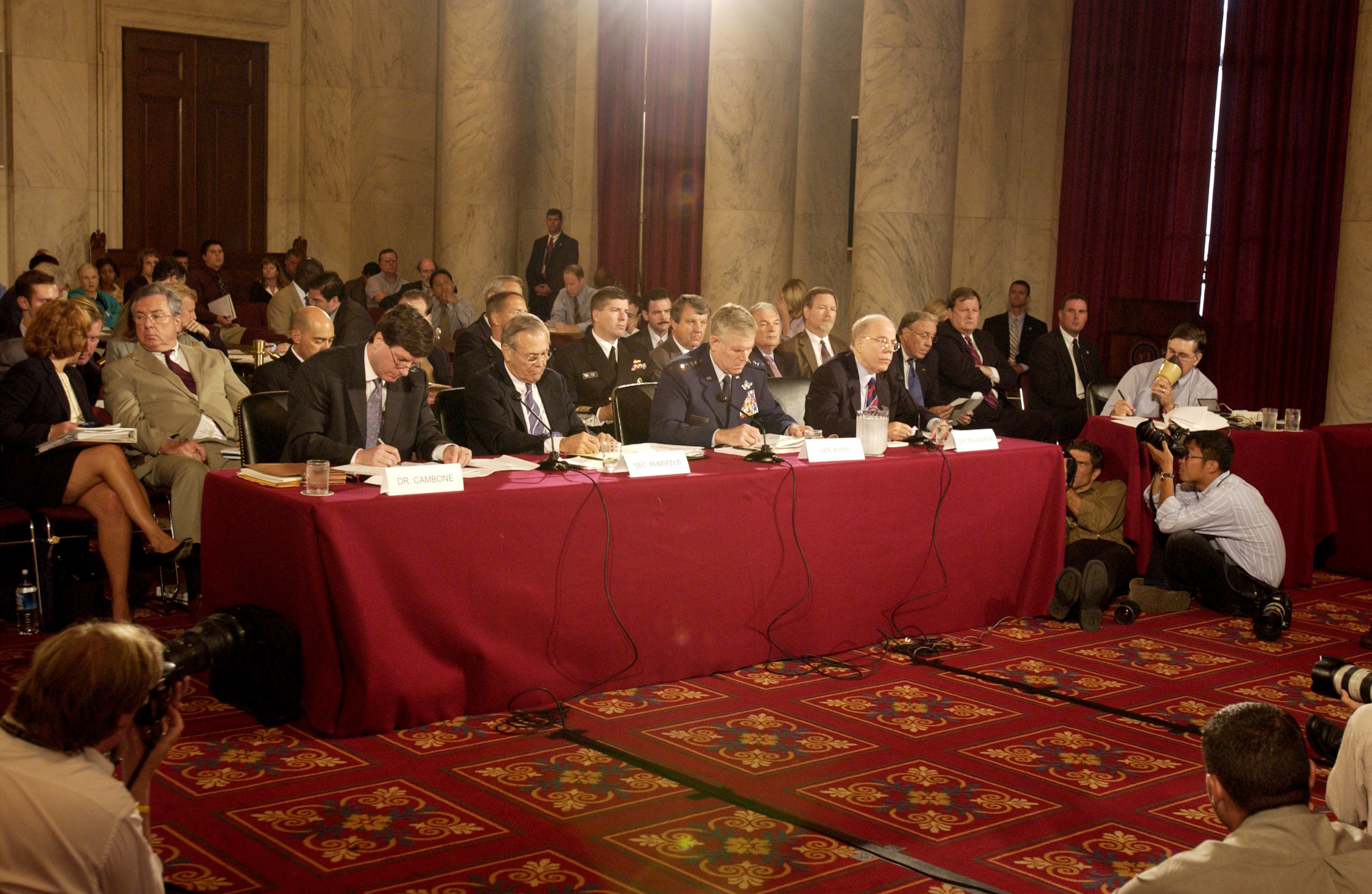
Undersecretary of Defense for Intelligence Stephen A. Cambone with Secretary of Defense Donald H. Rumsfeld, Chairman of the Joint Chiefs of Staff General Richard B. Myers, and Acting Director of Central Intelligence John E. McLaughlin during a testimony at Senate Armed Services Committee on August 17, 2004.

Stephen Anthony Cambone (born June 22, 1952) was the first United States Under Secretary of Defense for Intelligence, a post created in March 2003. Cambone first came to the attention of the public at large during the testimony of Major General Antonio Taguba before the U.S. Senate Armed Services Committee, where he disputed the General's statement that prison guards were under the effective control of military intelligence personnel and interrogators. Cambone resigned at the beginning of 2007 and was replaced by James R. Clapper, Jr., former head of the Defense Intelligence Agency (DIA) and the National Geospatial-Intelligence Agency. Cambone was associated with the Project for the New American Century, participating in the study which resulted in the writing of the report Rebuilding America's Defenses.

== Early life and career ==
Cambone graduated from The Catholic University of America in 1973 with a BA in political science and from the Claremont Graduate School in 1977 and 1982 with an MA and PhD respectively, both in political science. His awards include the Secretary of Defense Award for Outstanding Service in 1993 and the Employee of the Year Award with SRS Technologies (Washington Operations) in 1988.

Cambone was the Staff Director for the commission to Assess United States National Security Space Management and Organization from July 2000 to January 2001. He was the Director of Research at the Institute for National Strategic Studies, National Defense University from August 1998 to July 2000. Before that he was the Staff Director for the Commission to Assess the Ballistic Missile Threat to the United States from January 1998 to July 1998; a Senior Fellow in Political-Military Studies at the Center for Strategic and International Studies (CSIS) from 1993 to 1998; the Director for Strategic Defense Policy in the Office of the Secretary of Defense from 1990 to 1993; the deputy director, Strategic Analysis, SRS Technologies (Washington Operations) from 1986 to 1990; and a Staff Member in the Office of the Director, Los Alamos National Laboratory from 1982 to 1986.

== Under Secretary of Defense for Intelligence ==
Cambone was confirmed by the United States Senate as the Under Secretary of Defense for Intelligence on March 7, 2003. Prior to March 7, he was the Director, Program Analysis and Evaluation, Office of the Secretary of Defense. Dr. Cambone held that position since July 1, 2002. On July 19, 2001, he was confirmed by the United States Senate as the Principal Deputy Under Secretary of Defense for Policy. He held that position until July 1, 2002. Prior to that, he served as The Special Assistant to the Secretary of Defense and Deputy Secretary of Defense from January 2001 to July 2001.

In January 2001, as George W. Bush prepared to take office, Cambone served on a panel for nuclear weapons issues sponsored by the National Institute for Public Policy, a conservative think tank. Other members of the panel included Stephen Hadley, William Schneider, Jr., and Robert Joseph. This panel advocated using tactical nuclear weapons as a standard part of the United States defense arsenal.

Cambone resigned his post on December 31, 2006.

== Books by Stephen Cambone ==
- A New Structure for National Security Policy Planning. Center for Strategic and International Studies, 1998. ISBN 0-89206-345-9.
- NATO's Role in European Stability. Center for Strategic and International Studies, 1995. ISBN 0-89206-324-6.

== Reports by Stephen Cambone ==
- Defense in the Late 1990s: Avoiding the Trainwreck. Center for Strategic and International Studies, 1995. ISBN 0-89206-316-5.
- Organizing for security in Europe — What missions, what forces? Who leads, who pays? Center for Strategic and International Studies, 1996.
- Kodak moments, inescapable momentum, and the World Wide Web: Has the infocomm revolution transformed diplomacy? Mac Lean, Va.: The Center for Information Strategy and Policy, Science Applications International Corporation, 1996

Political offices
Preceded by Office created	Under Secretary of Defense for Intelligence; 2003–2006	Succeeded by James R. Clapper
