= Peter Steinfels =

American journalist and educator (born 1941)

Peter F. Steinfels (born 1941) is an American journalist and educator best known for his writings on religious topics.

A native of Chicago, Illinois, and a lifelong Roman Catholic, Steinfels earned his Ph.D. from Columbia University and joined the staff of the journal Commonweal in 1964. He served as a visiting professor at Notre Dame in 1994–95 and then as visiting professor at Georgetown University from 1997 to 2001. From 1990 to 2010, he wrote a column called "Beliefs" for the religion section of The New York Times.

He has also been a professor at Fordham University and co-director of the Fordham Center on Religion and Culture. Steinfels has written several books, including The Neoconservatives: The Men Who Are Changing America's Politics (ISBN 0-671-41384-8) and A People Adrift: The Crisis of the Roman Catholic Church in America (ISBN 0-684-83663-7).

He has argued in favor of the ordination of women as priests and deacons, and has suggested that this could eventually lead to the creation of female cardinals.

In 2003, he was awarded the Laetare Medal by the University of Notre Dame, the oldest and most prestigious award for American Catholics.

== Family ==
He is married to Margaret O'Brien Steinfels, a writer and former editor of Commonweal. They have two children, Gabrielle Steinfels and John Melville Steinfels.
