= Robert Joseph =

American academic and ambassador

Robert G. Joseph
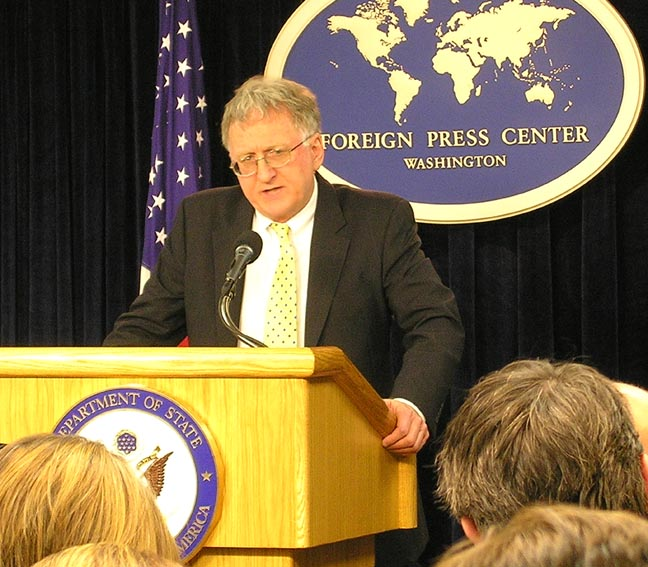
- Joseph in 2006
- Born: 1949 (age 76–77); Williston, North Dakota, U.S.
- Education: BA, 1971; MA 1973; PhD 1978
- Alma mater: St. Louis University; University of Chicago; Columbia University
- Occupations: former diplomat, federal administrator, academic
- Employer: National Institute for Public Policy

Robert Joseph

14th Under Secretary of State for Arms Control and International Security
- In office June 1, 2005 – March 2, 2007
- President: George W. Bush
- Preceded by: John R. Bolton
- Succeeded by: Ellen Tauscher

Robert G. Joseph (born 1949) is a senior scholar at the National Institute for Public Policy. He was a career civil servant who served in 3 presidential appointments, and twice unanimously confirmed by the US Senate. His last appointment was the United States Special Envoy for Nuclear Nonproliferation, with ambassadorial rank. Prior to this post, Joseph was the Under Secretary of State for Arms Control and International Security, a position he held until January 24, 2007. While on the National Security Council staff, Ambassador Joseph led the interagency efforts to withdraw the United States from ABM Treaty, allowing the US to defend its population and territory from ballistic missile attack.

Dr. Joseph is known for being instrumental in creating the Proliferation Security Initiative and as the architect of the Global Initiative to Combat Nuclear Terrorism. He was the US chief negotiator in 2003 who convinced the Libyans to give up their WMD programs. He authored a book describing his experience in negotiating with Libya entitled "Countering WMD."

Since leaving government service, Dr. Joseph has remained committed to the promotion of human rights in North Korea and Iran. He serves on the Board of Directors on the committee for Human Rights in North Korea (see hrnk.org). Pursuant to the Foreign Agents Registration Act (FARA) , Joseph is registered as working on behalf of the National Council of Resistance of Iran which supports the establishment of a democratic, secular and non-nuclear Iran.

== Education and career ==
Joseph was nominated to, and attended the United States Naval Academy (1967–1969). He earned a BA at St. Louis University in 1971, MA at the University of Chicago in 1973, and PhD at Columbia in 1978.

Joseph has served as a professor at a number of institutions, including Carleton College, Tulane University, and The Fletcher School of Law and Diplomacy at Tufts University. He was professor of National Security Studies at the National Defense University (1992–2001); he also founded the Center for Counterproliferation Research. In 1993, he joined the faculty at the National War College. Professor Joseph has also taught at Missouri State University's Defense and Strategic Studies program.

Joseph has held several posts relating to security and nuclear policy. These posts include the Office of the Assistant Secretary of Defense for International Security Affairs, Office of the Under Secretary of Defense (nuclear policy), Director of Theater Nuclear Forces Policy, U.S. Department of Defense (International Security Policy), Deputy Assistant Secretary for Nuclear Forces and Arms Control Policy, and Ambassador to the U.S.-Russian Consultative Commission on Nuclear Testing under George H. W. Bush.

In January 2001, as George W. Bush prepared to take office, Joseph served on a panel for nuclear weapons issues sponsored by the National Institute for Public Policy, a conservative think tank. Other members of the panel included Stephen Hadley, William Schneider, Jr., and Stephen Cambone.

He was senior director for proliferation strategy, counterproliferation and homeland defense within the National Security Council (2001–2005). In this capacity, he supervised the portion of President George W. Bush's 2003 State of the Union Address that dealt with intelligence on Iraqi weapons of mass destruction. Chairman Dianne Feinstein later proposed that her Senate Select Committee on Intelligence's probe of intelligence in the run up to the Iraq War question staff such as Joseph. In 2005 he succeeded John R. Bolton as Under Secretary of State for Arms Control and International Security.

Joseph is known for being instrumental in creating the Proliferation Security Initiative and as the architect of the Global Initiative to Combat Nuclear Terrorism. He was also the US chief negotiator to Libya in 2003 who convinced the Libyans to give up their WMD programs.

His past positions have included:

- Undersecretary for arms control & internat. security, US Department State, Washington, (2005–2007)
- Senior scholar, director of studies National Institute for Public Policy (2004–2005)
- Special assistant to the president and senior director of proliferation strategy, counterproliferation and homeland defense, NSC, Washington (2001–2005)
- founder, director, Center for Counterproliferation Research, National Defense University, Washington (1992–2001)
- professor of national security studies, National Defense University, Washington (1992–2001)
- ambassador, U.S.-Russian consultative commission on nuclear testing, US Department of Defense, Washington
- dep. asst. sec. nuclear forces & arms control policy, US Department of Defense, Washington (1989–1991)
- prin. dep. asst. sec. for internat. security policy, US Department of Defense, Washington (1987–1989)
- acting prin. dep. asst. sec. for internat. security policy, US Department of Defense, Washington, 1987
- Director of theater nuclear forces policy, US Mission, NATO, Brussels, (1985–1987)
- chief nuclear policy/plans section, US Department of Defense, Washington (1982–1984)
- assistant for nuclear policy, Office Under Secretary, US Department of Defense, Washington (1980–1981)
- assistant for general purpose forces, US Department of Defense, Washington, 1979
- assistant for negotiations, Office Asst. Sec. for Internat. Security Affairs, US Department of Defense, Washington, 1978

== Honors and awards ==
Joseph received the National Defense University President's Award for Individual Achievement (2004), the National Nuclear Security Administration Gold Medal for Distinguished Service. Additionally, he has received the Department of Defense Distinguished Civilian Service Award (2004), and multiple citations for Senior Executive Service Meritorious Achievement.

== Published works ==
- Countering WMD: The Libyan Experience. National Institute Press, 2009.
- "Moscow's Missile Gambit" The Washington Post, March 13, 2008. (with J. D. Crouch); also at Joseph, Robert; J. D. Crouch (March 13, 2008). "Missile Gambit". Washington Post. p. A.17. Archived from the original (Fee) on July 25, 2012.
- "Tough Calls, Good Calls" The Wall Street Journal, January 22, 2008. (with J. D. Crouch)
- National Institute for Public Policy "Rationale and Requirements for U.S. Nuclear Forces and Arms Control", 2001
- "The Case for National Missile Defense," Journal of Homeland Defense, October 2000
- "The Role of Nuclear Weapons in U.S. Deterrence Strategy," In Small Wars and Insurgencies, Autumn 2000
- "Counter-Proliferation in the Middle East," RUSI International Security Review, 2000
- "NBC Military Planning: Lessons Learned from Analysis and Wargaming," in Countering the Proliferation and Use of Weapons of Mass Destruction, McGraw-Hill, 1999, edited by Peter L. Hays, Vincent J. Jodoin, Alan R. Van Tassel. USAF Academy, CO : USAF Institute for National Security Studies, c1998. ISBN 0-07-012293-8 (pbk.)
- "U.S. Nuclear Policy in the 21st Century: A Fresh Look at National Strategy and Requirement," National Defense University Press, 1998
- "The Case for Nuclear Deterrence Today," Orbis, Winter 1998 (with John Reichart)
- "Nuclear Deterrence and Regional Proliferators," The Washington Quarterly, Summer 1997
- "Proliferation, Counter-Proliferation and NATO," Survival, Spring 1996
- "Deterrence and Defense in a Nuclear, Biological, and Chemical Environment," Comparative Strategy, January–March 1996
- "The Impact of NBC Proliferation on Doctrine and Operations," Joint Force Quarterly, Autumn 1996
- "NATO's Response to the Proliferation Challenge," Strategic Forum, Number 66, March 1996

Government offices
Preceded by John R. Bolton	Under Secretary of State for Arms Control and International Security; 2005–2007	Succeeded by John Rood; Acting
