= List of Department of State appointments by Joe Biden =

Below is a list of nominations and appointments to the Department of State by Joe Biden, the 46th president of the United States. As of August 2, 2024, according to tracking by The Washington Post and Partnership for Public Service, 41 nominees have been confirmed, 15 nominees are being considered by the Senate, 5 positions do not have nominees, and 20 appointments have been made to positions that don't require Senate confirmation.

== Color key ==
Denotes appointees awaiting Senate confirmation.

Denotes appointees serving in an acting capacity.

Denotes appointees who have left office or offices which have been disbanded.

== Secretary & Deputy Secretaries ==
Office	Nominee	Assumed office	Left office
— Secretary of State	Antony Blinken	January 26, 2021 (Confirmed January 26, 2021, 78–22)	—
— Deputy Secretary of State	Kurt M. Campbell	February 12, 2024 (Confirmed February 6, 2024, 92–5)	–
— Deputy Secretary of State	Victoria Nuland	July 29, 2023	February 12, 2024
— Deputy Secretary of State	Wendy Sherman	April 14, 2021 (Confirmed April 13, 2021, 56–42)	July 28, 2023
— Deputy Secretary of State for Management and Resources	Richard R. Verma	April 5, 2023 (Confirmed March 30, 2023, 67–26)	—
— Deputy Secretary of State for Management and Resources	John R. Bass	January 1, 2023	April 4, 2023
— Deputy Secretary of State for Management and Resources	Brian P. McKeon	March 19, 2021 (Confirmed March 18, 2021 by voice vote)	December 31, 2022

== Office of Political Affairs ==
Office	Nominee	Assumed office	Left office
— Under Secretary of State for Political Affairs
— Under Secretary of State for Political Affairs	John R. Bass	March 22, 2024	–
— Under Secretary of State for Political Affairs	Victoria Nuland	May 3, 2021 (Confirmed April 29, 2021 by voice vote)	March 22, 2024
— Assistant Secretary of State (African Affairs)	Mary Catherine Phee	September 30, 2021 (Confirmed September 28, 2021, 67–31)	—
— Assistant Secretary of State (East Asian and Pacific Affairs)	Daniel Kritenbrink	September 24, 2021 (Confirmed September 23, 2021, 72–14)	January 17, 2025
— Assistant Secretary of State (European and Eurasian Affairs)	James C. O'Brien	October 5, 2023 (Confirmed October 4, 2023, 67–31)	—
— Assistant Secretary of State (European and Eurasian Affairs)	Yuri Kim	July 10, 2023	October 5, 2023
— Assistant Secretary of State (European and Eurasian Affairs)	Dereck J. Hogan	April 1, 2023	July 10, 2023
— Assistant Secretary of State (European and Eurasian Affairs)	Karen Donfried	September 30, 2021 (Confirmed September 28, 2021, 73–26)	March 31, 2023
— Assistant Secretary of State (International Organization Affairs)	Michele J. Sison	December 21, 2021 (Confirmed December 18, 2021 by voice vote)	—
— Assistant Secretary of State (Near Eastern Affairs)	Barbara A. Leaf	May 31, 2022 (Confirmed May 18, 2022, 54–44)	—
— Assistant Secretary of State (South and Central Asian Affairs)	Donald Lu	September 15, 2021 (Confirmed September 13, 2021 by voice vote)	—
— Assistant Secretary of State (Western Hemisphere Affairs)	Brian A. Nichols	September 15, 2021 (Confirmed September 13, 2021 by voice vote)	December 31, 2024
— Ambassador-at-Large for Counterterrorism & Coordinator for Counterterrorism	Elizabeth H. Richard	December 29, 2023 (Confirmed December 19, 2023, 49–15)	—

== Office of Arms Control and International Security ==
Office	Nominee	Assumed office	Left office
— Under Secretary of State (Arms Control and International Security Affairs)	Bonnie Jenkins	July 22, 2021 (Confirmed July 21, 2021, 52–48)	December 31, 2024
— Assistant Secretary of State (Arms Control, Verification, and Compliance)	Mallory Stewart	April 18, 2022 (Confirmed March 29, 2022 by voice vote)	—
— Assistant Secretary of State (International Security and Nonproliferation)	C.S. Eliot Kang	March 31, 2022 (Confirmed March 29, 2022, 52–46)	—
— Assistant Secretary of State (Political-Military Affairs)
— Assistant Secretary of State (Political-Military Affairs)	Stanley L. Brown	July 16, 2024	–
— Assistant Secretary of State (Political-Military Affairs)	Jessica Lewis	September 30, 2021 (Confirmed September 29, 2021, 70–27)	July 16, 2024

== Office of Civilian Security, Democracy and Human Rights ==
Office	Nominee	Assumed office	Left office
— Under Secretary of State (Civilian Security, Democracy and Human Rights)	Uzra Zeya	July 14, 2021 (Confirmed July 13, 2021, 73–24)	—
— Assistant Secretary of State (Conflict and Stabilization Operations)	Anne Witkowsky	January 10, 2022 (Confirmed January 5, 2022, 61–26)	—
— Assistant Secretary of State (Democracy, Human Rights, and Labor)	Dafna Hochman Rand	August 8, 2024 (Confirmed August 1, 2024 by voice vote)	—
— Ambassador-at-Large for Global Criminal Justice	Beth Van Schaack	March 17, 2022 (Confirmed March 15, 2022 by voice vote)	—
— Assistant Secretary of State (International Narcotics and Law Enforcement Affairs)	Todd D. Robinson	September 30, 2021 (Confirmed September 28, 2021, 53–41)	January 17, 2025
— Ambassador-at-Large for International Religious Freedom	Rashad Hussain	January 24, 2022 (Confirmed December 16, 2021, 85–5)	—
— Ambassador-at-Large to Monitor and Combat Trafficking in Persons	Cindy Dyer	January 4, 2023 (Confirmed December 20, 2022, by voice vote)	—
— Assistant Secretary of State (Population, Refugees, and Migration)
— Assistant Secretary of State (Population, Refugees, and Migration)	Marta Costanzo Youth	October 7, 2024	January 17, 2025
— Assistant Secretary of State (Population, Refugees, and Migration)	Julieta Valls Noyes	March 31, 2022 (Confirmed March 24, 2022 by voice vote)	October 4, 2024

== Office of Economic Growth, Energy, and the Environment ==
Office	Nominee	Assumed office	Left office
— Under Secretary of State (Economic Growth, Energy, and the Environment)	Jose W. Fernandez	August 6, 2021 (Confirmed August 5, 2021 by voice vote)	—
— Assistant Secretary of State (Economic and Business Affairs)
— Assistant Secretary of State (Economic and Business Affairs)	Amy Holman	June 28, 2024	–
— Assistant Secretary of State (Economic and Business Affairs)	Ramin Toloui	January 24, 2022 (Confirmed December 16, 2021, 76–13)	June 28, 2024
— Coordinator for Sanctions; Established by the Consolidated Appropriations Act, 2021	James C. O'Brien	April 14, 2022 (Confirmed April 6, 2022, 71–26)	October 5, 2023
— Assistant Secretary of State (Energy Resources)	Geoffrey Pyatt	September 19, 2022 (Confirmed September 15, 2022 by voice vote)	—
— Assistant Secretary of State (Oceans and International, Environmental and Scientific Affairs)
— Assistant Secretary of State (Oceans and International, Environmental and Scientific Affairs)	Jennifer R. Littlejohn	May 1, 2023	–
— Assistant Secretary of State (Oceans and International, Environmental and Scientific Affairs)	Monica Medina	September 28, 2021 (Confirmed September 28, 2021, 61–36)	April 28, 2023

== Office of Management ==
Office	Nominee	Assumed office	Left office
— Under Secretary of State (Management)	John R. Bass	December 29, 2021 (Confirmed December 18, 2021 by voice vote)	—
— Assistant Secretary of State (Administration)	Alaina B. Teplitz	December 6, 2021	—
— Assistant Secretary of State (Consular Affairs)	Rena Bitter	August 12, 2021 (Confirmed August 9, 2021 by voice vote)	—
— Assistant Secretary of State (Diplomatic Security)	Gentry O. Smith	August 12, 2021 (Confirmed August 9, 2021 by voice vote)	—
— Director General of the Foreign Service	Marcia Bernicat	June 6, 2022 (Confirmed May 26, 2022, 82–10)	—
— Director of the Office of Foreign Missions	Rebecca Gonzales	May 31, 2022 (Confirmed May 19, 2022 by voice vote)	—

== Office of Public Diplomacy and Public Affairs ==
Office	Nominee	Assumed office	Left office
— Under Secretary of State for Public Diplomacy and Public Affairs
— Under Secretary of State for Public Diplomacy and Public Affairs	Lee Satterfield	August 3, 2024	–
— Under Secretary of State for Public Diplomacy and Public Affairs	Elizabeth M. Allen	June 15, 2023 (Confirmed June 13, 2023, 66–33)	August 2, 2024
— Assistant Secretary of State (Educational and Cultural Affairs)	Lee Satterfield	November 23, 2021 (Confirmed November 18, 2021 by voice vote)	—
— Assistant Secretary of State (Global Public Affairs)
— Assistant Secretary of State (Global Public Affairs)	Stephanie C. Sutton	September 16, 2024	–
— Assistant Secretary of State (Global Public Affairs)	Kristin Kane (Note: As “Senior Bureau Official”)	July 1, 2024	September 16, 2024
— Assistant Secretary of State (Global Public Affairs)	William M. Russo	February 15, 2023	April 6, 2024
— Assistant Secretary of State (Global Public Affairs)	Elizabeth Trudeau	April 4, 2022	February 15, 2023
— Assistant Secretary of State (Global Public Affairs)	Elizabeth M. Allen	September 13, 2021	April 4, 2022

=== J. William Fulbright Foreign Scholarship Board ===
Office	Nominee	Assumed office	Left office
— Member of the J. William Fulbright Foreign Scholarship Board	Donna Brazile	June 15, 2022	—
— Member of the J. William Fulbright Foreign Scholarship Board	James Costos	June 15, 2022	—
— Member of the J. William Fulbright Foreign Scholarship Board	James R. Berman	August 19, 2022	—
— Member of the J. William Fulbright Foreign Scholarship Board	Michael Trager	August 19, 2022	—
— Member of the J. William Fulbright Foreign Scholarship Board	Carmen Estrada-Schaye	November 22, 2022	—
— Member of the J. William Fulbright Foreign Scholarship Board	Bill Freeman	November 22, 2022	—
— Member of the J. William Fulbright Foreign Scholarship Board	Jennifer Lin	November 22, 2022	—
— Member of the J. William Fulbright Foreign Scholarship Board	Jill Nash	January 26, 2023	—
— Member of the J. William Fulbright Foreign Scholarship Board	Jed Katz	September 15, 2023	—
— Member of the J. William Fulbright Foreign Scholarship Board	David Price	November 15, 2023	—
— Member of the J. William Fulbright Foreign Scholarship Board	Denise Grant	March 8, 2024	—
— Member of the J. William Fulbright Foreign Scholarship Board	Lynn Tincher-Ladner	March 8, 2024	—

== Office of the Secretary & Deputy Secretaries ==
Office	Nominee	Assumed office	Left office
— Legal Adviser of the Department of State	Margaret L. Taylor	September 24, 2024 (Confirmed September 18, 2024, 50-44)	—
— Chief of Protocol
— Chief of Protocol	Ethan Rosenzweig	August 1, 2023	–
— Chief of Protocol	Rufus Gifford	January 3, 2022 (Confirmed December 18, 2021 by voice vote)	July 28, 2023
— Ambassador-at-Large for Cyberspace and Digital Policy	Nate Fick	September 21, 2022 (Confirmed September 15, 2022 by voice vote)	—
— Coordinator for International Communications and Information Policy	Stephan A. Lang	June 28, 2024 (Confirmed May 14, 2024 by voice vote)	—
— Ambassador-at-Large for Global Health Diplomacy and Global AIDS Coordinator	John Nkengasong	June 13, 2022 (Confirmed May 5, 2022 by voice vote)	—
— Ambassador-at-Large for Global Women's Issues	Geeta Rao Gupta	May 18, 2023 (Confirmed May 10, 2023, 51–47)	—
— Assistant Secretary of State (Intelligence and Research)
— Assistant Secretary of State (Intelligence and Research)	Lisa D. Kenna (Note: As “Senior Bureau Official”)	July 5, 2024	–
— Assistant Secretary of State (Intelligence and Research)	Brett M. Holmgren	September 15, 2021 (Confirmed September 13, 2021 by voice vote)	July 5, 2024
— Assistant Secretary of State (Legislative Affairs)	Naz Durakoğlu	July 22, 2022 (Confirmed June 16, 2022 by voice vote)	December 20, 2024
— Inspector General of the Department of State	Cardell K. Richardson	May 20, 2024 (Confirmed May 2, 2024 by voice vote)	—
— Chief of Staff to the Secretary of State	Suzy George	January 20, 2021	—
— Counselor of the Department of State	Tom Sullivan	July 22, 2024	—
— Counselor of the Department of State	Derek Chollet	January 20, 2021	July 7, 2024
— Director of Policy Planning	Salman Ahmed	January 20, 2021	—
— Spokesperson for the Department of State	Matthew Miller	April 24, 2023	—
— Spokesperson for the Department of State	Ned Price	January 20, 2021	March 17, 2023
— Deputy Spokesperson for the Department of State	Vedant Patel	June 6, 2022	—
— Deputy Spokesperson for the Department of State	Jalina Porter	January 20, 2021	June 3, 2022

== United States Mission to the United Nations ==
This list contains the non-ambassadorial appointments made within the scope of the U.S. Mission to the United Nations.

Office	Nominee	Assumed office	Left office
— Deputy to the Ambassador to the United Nations	Ned Price	February 29, 2024	–
— Deputy to the Ambassador to the United Nations	Jeffrey Prescott	January 20, 2021	February 25, 2024
— Representative to the Sessions of the General Assembly of the United Nations	Linda Thomas-Greenfield	February 23, 2021 (Confirmed February 23, 2021, 78–21)	—
— Alternate Representative to the Sessions of the General Assembly of the United Nations	Lisa Carty	April 8, 2022 (Confirmed March 29, 2022 by voice vote)	—
— Alternate Representative to the Sessions of the General Assembly of the United Nations	Robert A. Wood	October 6, 2022 (Confirmed September 21, 2022 by voice vote)	—
— Representative to the 77th Session of the General Assembly of the United Nations	Patrick Leahy	September 15, 2022 (Confirmed September 15, 2022 by voice vote)	September 27, 2022
— Representative to the 77th Session of the General Assembly of the United Nations	Jim Risch	September 15, 2022 (Confirmed September 15, 2022 by voice vote)	September 27, 2022

== Withdrawn nominations ==
Office	Nominee	Announced	Withdrawn	Notes
— Assistant Secretary of State (Democracy, Human Rights, and Labor)	Sarah Margon	April 23, 2021	January 3, 2023	
— Legal Adviser of the Department of State	Sarah H. Cleveland	August 10, 2021	January 3, 2023	
— Representative to the 76th Session of the General Assembly of the United Nations	Barbara Lee	September 13, 2021	January 3, 2023	
— Representative to the 76th Session of the General Assembly of the United Nations	French Hill	September 13, 2021	January 3, 2023	
— Representative to the 76th Session of the General Assembly of the United Nations	Sim Farar	September 13, 2021	January 3, 2023	
— Representative to the 76th Session of the General Assembly of the United Nations	Tom Carnahan	September 13, 2021	January 3, 2023	
— Member of the U.S. Advisory Commission on Public Diplomacy	Janet Keller	March 11, 2022	January 3, 2025	
— Member of the U.S. Advisory Commission on Public Diplomacy	Jay T. Snyder	July 29, 2022	January 3, 2025	
— Representative to the 77th Session of the General Assembly of the United Nations	S. Douglas Bunch	September 6, 2022	January 3, 2023	
— Representative to the 77th Session of the General Assembly of the United Nations	Carol Leslie Hamilton	September 6, 2022	January 3, 2023	
— Representative to the 77th Session of the General Assembly of the United Nations	Andrew Weinstein	September 6, 2022	January 3, 2023	
— Representative to the Sessions of the General Assembly of the United Nations	Dorothy Shea	January 3, 2023	January 3, 2025	
— Member of the U.S. Advisory Commission on Public Diplomacy	James J. Blanchard	March 20, 2023	January 3, 2025	
— Member of the U.S. Advisory Commission on Public Diplomacy	Elliott Abrams	July 3, 2023	January 3, 2025	
— Representative to the 78th Session of the General Assembly of the United Nations	Calvin Smyre	September 3, 2023	January 3, 2024	
— Representative to the 78th Session of the General Assembly of the United Nations	Barbara Lee	September 3, 2023	January 3, 2025	
— Representative to the 78th Session of the General Assembly of the United Nations	French Hill	September 3, 2023	January 3, 2025	
— Representative to the 78th Session of the General Assembly of the United Nations	Janet Keller	September 3, 2023	January 3, 2025	
— Representative to the 78th Session of the General Assembly of the United Nations	Jeffrey Worthe	September 3, 2023	January 3, 2025	
— Coordinator for Sanctions; Established by the Consolidated Appropriations Act, 2021	Erik Woodhouse	September 5, 2023	July 11, 2024	
— Ambassador-at-Large for Global Health Security and Diplomacy	John Nkengasong	September 28, 2023	January 3, 2025	
— Assistant Secretary of State (Oceans and International, Environmental and Scientific Affairs)	Kris Sarri	November 30, 2023	January 3, 2025	
— Member of the U.S. Advisory Commission on Public Diplomacy	Rebeccah Heinrichs	May 23, 2024	January 3, 2025	
— Under Secretary of State for Political Affairs	Julianne Smith	June 5, 2024	January 3, 2025	
— Representative to the 79th Session of the General Assembly of the United Nations	Ben Cardin	September 9, 2024	January 3, 2025	
— Representative to the 79th Session of the General Assembly of the United Nations	Dan Sullivan	September 9, 2024	January 3, 2025	
— Representative to the 79th Session of the General Assembly of the United Nations	Tanya Leigh Flores	September 9, 2024	January 3, 2025	
— Representative to the 79th Session of the General Assembly of the United Nations	Michael Trager	September 9, 2024	January 3, 2025	

== See also ==
- Cabinet of Joe Biden, for the vetting process undergone by top-level roles including advice and consent by the Senate
- List of executive branch 'czars' e.g. Special Advisor to the President
- List of all Assistant Secretary of State roles within the U.S. Department of State
- List of all Under Secretary of State roles within the U.S. Department of State

== Notes ==
Confirmation votes

Confirmations by roll call vote

Confirmations by voice vote
