= Richard G. Olson =

American diplomat (born 1959)

Richard Olson
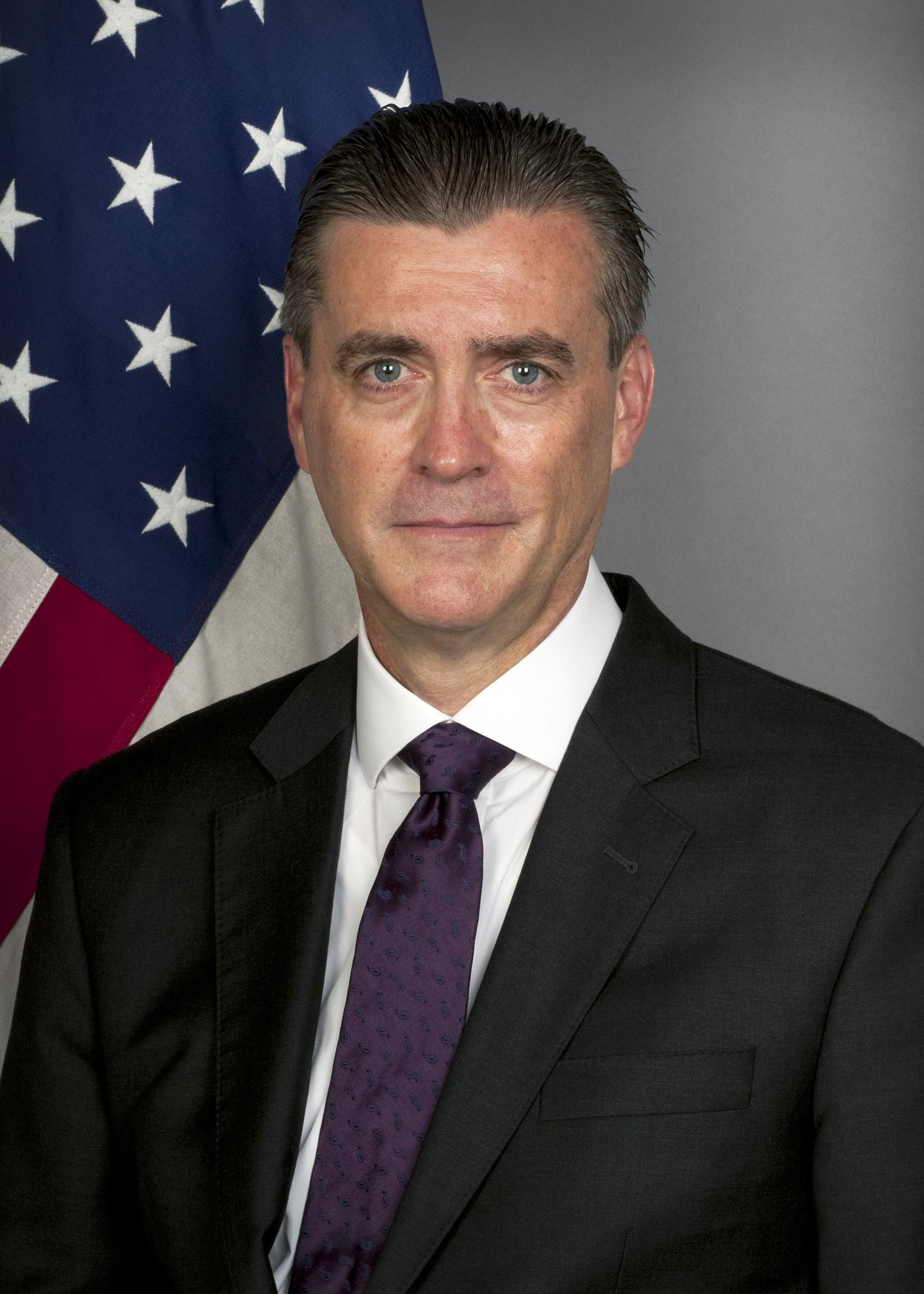
- Official portrait, 2012

United States Special Representative for Afghanistan and Pakistan
- In office November 17, 2015 – November 17, 2016
- President: Barack Obama
- Preceded by: Jarrett Blanc (acting)
- Succeeded by: Laurel Miller (acting)

United States Ambassador to Pakistan
- In office October 31, 2012 – October 27, 2015
- President: Barack Obama
- Preceded by: Cameron Munter
- Succeeded by: David Hale

United States Ambassador to the United Arab Emirates
- In office October 14, 2008 – May 2, 2011
- President: George W. Bush; Barack Obama
- Preceded by: Michele Sison
- Succeeded by: Michael Corbin

Personal details
- Born: 1959 (age 66–67)
- Spouses: Deborah Jones (div. 2019) Muna Habib (m. 2019)
- Children: 2
- Education: Brown University
- Awards: Secretary of Defense Exceptional Civilian Service Award; Superior Honor Award

Richard Gustave Olson Jr. (born 1959) is an American diplomat and career Foreign Service officer, who formerly served as the United States ambassador to Pakistan. Prior to his appointment in Pakistan, Olson had served as U.S. ambassador to the United Arab Emirates as well the coordinating director for development and economic Affairs at the U.S. embassy in Kabul with the rank of ambassador. He is a career member of the Foreign Service, class of career minister.

== Education ==
Olson earned an undergraduate degree in law and society, and history from Brown University in 1981.

== Career ==
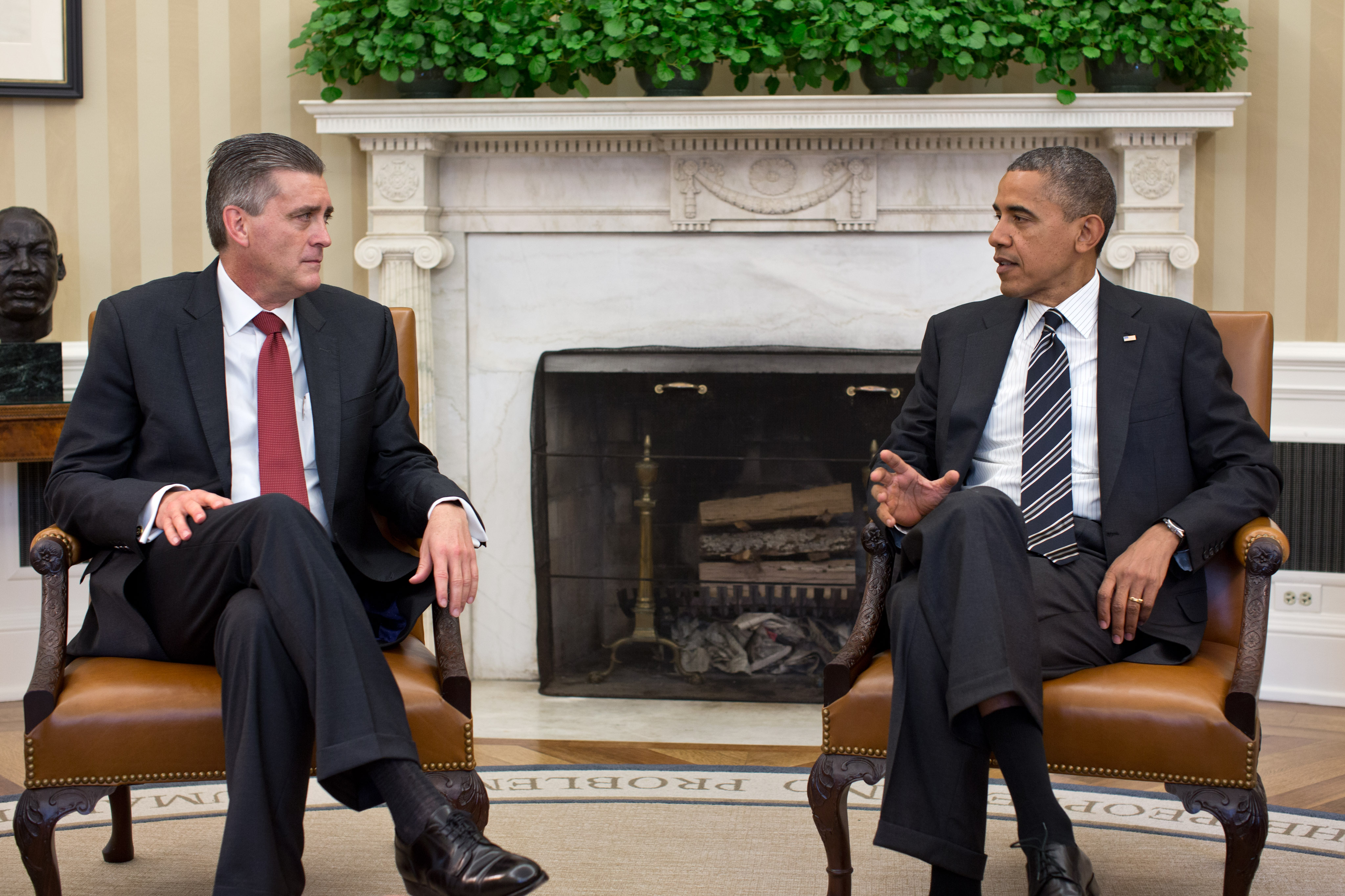
Ambassador Olson with President Barack Obama

Olson joined the U.S. State Department in 1982, and served tenures in Mexico, Uganda, Tunisia, Saudi Arabia, Ethiopia and Iraq, and three tours in the United Arab Emirates.

Olson has also served as the deputy chief of mission at the United States mission to the North Atlantic Treaty Organization (NATO) from 2006 to 2008.

He served as U.S. consul general in Dubai from 2001 to 2003. From 2008 to 2011, Olson was the U.S. ambassador to the United Arab Emirates.

Olson served as coordinating director for development and economic affairs at the U.S. embassy in Kabul, from June 2011 to June 2012.

In 2012, Cameron Munter resigned as the United States ambassador to Pakistan after relations between Pakistan and the United States deteriorated following the U.S. raid that killed Osama bin Laden in Pakistan. President Barack Obama nominated Olson for ambassadorship, and he was later confirmed by the United States Senate. He presented his credentials to President Asif Ali Zardari on October 31, 2012.

In 2023, Olson was sentenced to three years of probation and ordered to pay a $93,350 fine for improperly helping a wealthy Persian Gulf country influence U.S. policy and for not disclosing gifts he received from a disgraced political fundraiser.

== Awards and honors ==
Olson has been awarded the Presidential Distinguished Service Award and the Secretary of Defense's Exceptional Civilian Service Award, and is a three-time recipient of the State Department's Superior Honor Award.

Diplomatic posts
Preceded by Michele Sison	United States Ambassador to the United Arab Emirates; 2008–2011	Succeeded by Michael Corbin
Preceded by Cameron Munter	United States Ambassador to Pakistan; 2012–2015	Succeeded by David Hale
Preceded by Jarrett Blanc; Acting	United States Special Representative for Afghanistan and Pakistan; 2015–2016	Incumbent
