= Barbara A. Leaf =

American diplomat

Barbara Leaf
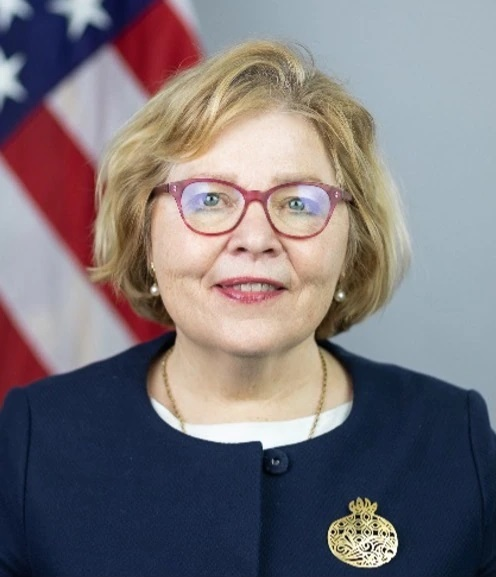
- Official portrait, 2021

25th Assistant Secretary of State for Near Eastern Affairs
- In office May 31, 2022 – January 20, 2025
- President: Joe Biden
- Preceded by: David Schenker
- Succeeded by: Donald Blome

United States Ambassador to the United Arab Emirates
- In office January 20, 2015 – March 23, 2018
- President: Barack Obama; Donald Trump
- Preceded by: Michael H. Corbin
- Succeeded by: John Rakolta

Personal details
- Education: College of William and Mary (BA); University of Virginia (MA)

Barbara A. Leaf is a U.S. diplomat who served as Assistant Secretary of State for Near Eastern Affairs under President Joe Biden from 2022 to 2025. As former Senior Foreign Service officer, she served as the U.S. ambassador to the United Arab Emirates from 2015 to 2018.

== Education ==
Leaf graduated from the College of William & Mary in 1980 with a B.A. in Government and holds an M.A. in Foreign Affairs with a focus on Soviet Affairs from the University of Virginia.

== Career ==
From 1996 to 2000, Leaf served as the Department's Middle East "Watcher" at the U.S. Embassy in Paris, reporting on French policies on Iraq, Iran, the Arab-Israeli dispute, Libya, and terrorism issues.

From 2001 to 2003, Leaf served as Advisor to the Department's Medical Director, in a position created in the wake of September 11 to develop medical and security programs to counter and respond to chemical/biological/nuclear threats to U.S. diplomatic installations abroad.

From 2004 to 2006, Leaf served as Political Counselor at the U.S. Embassy in Sarajevo, Bosnia-Herzegovina, where she helped advance U.S. policy goals on democratization and political reform, counter-terrorism, and regional reintegration among the former combatant states of the former Yugoslavia.

From 2003 to 2004, she directed the Regional Headquarters of the Office of the High Representative (OHR), in Tuzla, Bosnia-Herzegovina, enforcing implementation of civilian aspects of the Dayton peace accords, including the return of refugees to areas from which they had been ethnically cleansed.

Leaf directed the U.S. Provincial Reconstruction Team in the strategic province of Basrah, Iraq, from 2010 to 2011, leaving an assignment as Political Minister Counselor at the U.S. Embassy in Rome, Italy, to oversee the PRT's transition to a U.S. Consulate General.

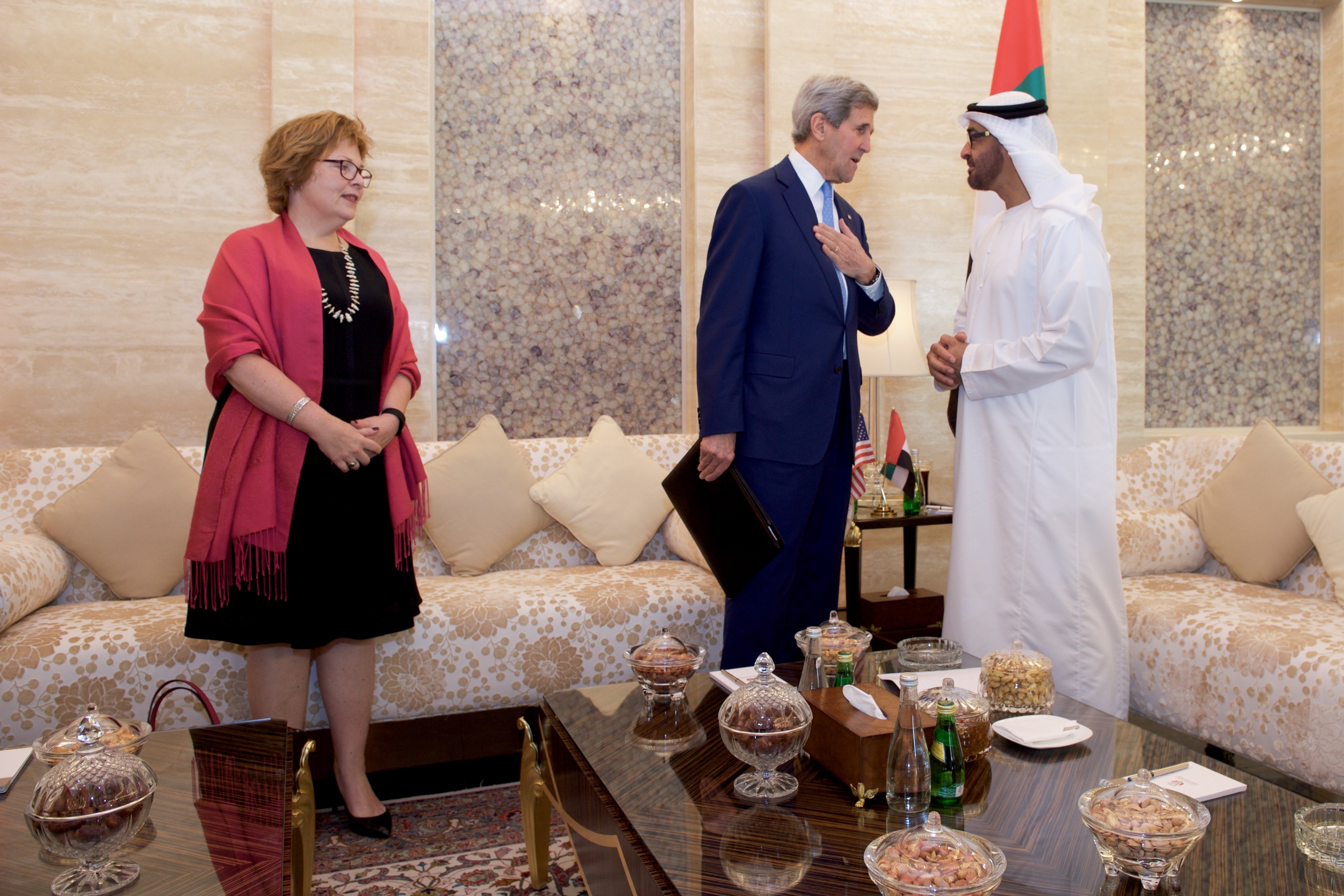
Leaf with Secretary of State John Kerry and Crown Prince of Abu Dhabi Mohamed bin Zayed in 2015

She was the Deputy Assistant Secretary of State for the Arabian Peninsula in the Bureau of Near Eastern Affairs and served as Deputy Assistant Secretary of State for Iraq from 2011 to 2013. She served as U.S. Ambassador to the United Arab Emirates until 2018.

Leaf was the Ruth and Sid Lapidus Fellow at The Washington Institute and director of the Geduld Program on Arab Politics from 2018 to 2022.

=== Biden administration ===
In January 2021, Leaf was named the National Security Council Senior Director for the Middle East and North Africa for the Biden administration.

On April 15, 2021, President Joe Biden nominated Leaf to be the assistant secretary of state for Near Eastern affairs. The Senate Foreign Relations Committee held hearings on Leaf's nomination on September 15, 2021. The committee favorably reported Leaf's nomination to the Senate floor on November 3, 2021. The nomination ultimately stalled, and was returned to President Biden on January 3, 2022.

Leaf was renominated the following day on January 4, 2022. Her nomination was favorably reported by of committee on March 29, 2022. Leaf was confirmed on May 18, 2022, by a Senate vote of 54-44.

In December 2024, Leaf participated in the first formal US diplomatic presence in Syria in over 10 years when she met with Syria's new de facto leader, Ahmed al-Sharaa, in Damascus, following the rebel's ouster of the previous regime. Leaf stated that the meeting was "productive", and the US government shortly thereafter cancelled a $10 million bounty that it had offered for his capture.

== Personal life ==
Leaf speaks Arabic, French, Italian, and Serbo-Croatian.

== Articles ==
- Washington Confuses Tactics with Strategy: The Perils of Shuttering the U.S. Embassy in Baghdad, October 9, 2020.
- The F-35 Triangle: America, Israel, the United Arab Emirates, September 15, 2020.
- The UAE-Israel Breakthrough: Bilateral and Regional Implications and U.S. Policy, September 14, 2020.
- The Gulf’s Calculus on UAE-Israel Deal, August 19, 2020.
- The New U.S.-Iraq Strategic Dialogue: Expert Views from Both Sides, June 18, 2020.
- U.S.-Iran Tensions: Implications for Homeland Security, January 15, 2020.
- Don’t Write Off Iraq, September 24, 2019.
- Bringing Diplomacy Back to the Pressure Campaign Against Iran, September 23, 2019.
- The Ends of Iran: Next Steps for Tehran and Its Neighbors, May 30, 2019.
- A U.S.-Iraq Security Partnership: Avoiding the Pitfalls Just Ahead, March 13, 2019.
- Reports from Saudi Arabia, Israel, and Capitol Hill: Middle East Policy Forecast for 2019, February 4, 2019.
- It’s Time for a Serious Saudi-Houthi Back Channel, January 9, 2019.
- Containing Iranian Proxies in Iraq, September 26, 2018.
- U.S. and Iran Ramp Up War of Words Ahead of Sanctions, July 30, 2018.
- Yemen Is Not a Sideshow, June 12, 2018.

== See also ==
- List of Department of State appointments by Joe Biden
