= Theodore H. Kattouf =

American diplomat

United States Ambassador to Syria
- In office 2001–2003
- President: George W. Bush
- Preceded by: Ryan Crocker
- Succeeded by: Margaret Scobey

United States Ambassador to the United Arab Emirates
- In office 1999–2001
- President: Bill Clinton
- Preceded by: David C. Litt
- Succeeded by: Marcelle Wahba

Personal details
- Born: 1946 (age 79–80) Altoona, Pennsylvania, U.S.
- Party: Democrat
- Spouse: Jeannie
- Children: 4, Jonathan, Michael, Jennifer, Paul
- Profession: Diplomat, Career Ambassador

Theodore H. Kattouf (born 1946 Altoona, Pennsylvania) is an American diplomat.

== Life ==
Kattouf graduated from the Pennsylvania State University in 1968. He served in the United States Army, attaining the rank of captain. He joined the Foreign Service in 1972. In 1982–83, he was a Department of State fellow at Princeton University.

He was Ambassador to the United Arab Emirates from 1999 to 2001. He was Ambassador to Syria from 2002 to 2003.

He was President and CEO of Amideast, beginning on September 2, 2003. He retired in June 2022.

On June 23, 2024, his son Paul was killed in road-rage incident.

Diplomatic posts
Preceded by David C. Litt	United States Ambassador to the United Arab Emirates; 1999–2001	Succeeded by Marcelle Wahba
Diplomatic posts
Preceded by Ryan Crocker	United States Ambassador to Syria; 2001–2003	Succeeded by Margaret Scobey
