= List of ambassadors of the United States to the United Arab Emirates =

Ambassador of the United States to the United Arab Emirates
- سفير الولايات المتحدة الأميركية في دولة الإمارات العربية المتحدة
- Seal of the United States Mission to Abu Dhabi

- United States ambassador flag

- Incumbent; Shannon Dolan; Chargé d'affaires since May 29, 2026
- Nominator: The president of the United States
- Inaugural holder: William Stoltzfus as Ambassador Extraordinary and Plenipotentiary
- Formation: February 29, 1972
- Website: U.S. Embassy - Abu Dhabi

The ambassador of the United States to the United Arab Emirates is the official representative of the president of the United States to the head of state of the United Arab Emirates (UAE).

The U.S. embassy to the UAE is located in Embassies District, Sector W59-02, Abu Dhabi.

== History ==
The United Arab Emirates is a federation of seven emirates, each ruled by a Sheikh. Until 1971 the sheikhdoms had been protectorates of the United Kingdom, known as the Trucial States. On December 1, 1971 The UK ended its relationship with the Trucial States and the sheikhdoms became independent. On December 2 the seven sheikhdoms, under the leadership of Zayed bin Sultan Al Nahyan united to form the United Arab Emirates.

The United States recognized the independence of the United Arab Emirates the next day on 3 December 1971. Diplomatic relations were established on March 20, 1972, when Envoy William Stoltzfus presented his credentials to the government of the United Arab Emirates. Stoltzfus was concurrently accredited to Bahrain, Kuwait, Qatar, and Oman, and the UAE while resident at the U.S. Embassy in Kuwait. During Stolzfus’ tenure as non-resident Ambassador, the embassy in Abu Dhabi was established on May 15, 1972, with Philip J. Griffin as Chargé d'Affaires ad interim. The first ambassador solely accredited to the UAE was Michael Sterner, who presented his credentials on May 24, 1974.

== Ambassadors ==
#	Ambassador	Portrait	Appointment	Presentation	Termination	Appointer	Notes
1	William Stoltzfus		February 29, 1972	March 20, 1972	June 23, 1974		
2	Michael E. Sterner		May 24, 1974	June 24, 1974	August 24, 1976		
3	Mukhtar Rahimi		September 16, 1976	December 14, 1976	August 4, 1979		
4	William D. Wolle		September 28, 1979	December 15, 1979	April 6, 1981		
5	George Quincey Lumsden, Jr.		July 2, 1982	October 13, 1982	January 28, 1986	Ronald Reagan	
6	David Lyle Mack		September 12, 1986	October 7, 1986	October 24, 1989		
7	Edward S. Walker, Jr.		November 21, 1989	January 16, 1990	June 23, 1992		
8	William Arthur Rugh		October 9, 1992	November 3, 1992	June 1, 1995		
9	David C. Litt		October 3, 1995	October 23, 1995	October 13, 1998		
10	Theodore H. Kattouf		October 1, 1998	April 4, 1999	August 12, 2001	Bill Clinton	
11	Marcelle Wahba		September 17, 2001	November 6, 2001	June 17, 2004	Bill Clinton	
12	Michele J. Sison		May 12, 2004	February 7, 2005	January 19, 2008	George W. Bush	
13	Richard G. Olson		September 28, 2008	October 14, 2008	May 2, 2011	George W. Bush	
14	Michael H. Corbin		July 25, 2011	July 28, 2011	December 16, 2014	Barack Obama	
15	Barbara A. Leaf		November 25, 2014	January 20, 2015	March 23, 2018	Barack Obama	
16	John Rakolta		September 17, 2019	October 27, 2019	January 20, 2021	Donald Trump	
17	Martina A. Strong		July 27, 2023	October 4, 2023	August 5, 2025	Joe Biden	

== See also ==
- United Arab Emirates – United States relations
- Embassy of the United States, Abu Dhabi
- Foreign relations of the United Arab Emirates
- Ambassadors of the United States
