= Michael H. Corbin =

American diplomat (born 1960)

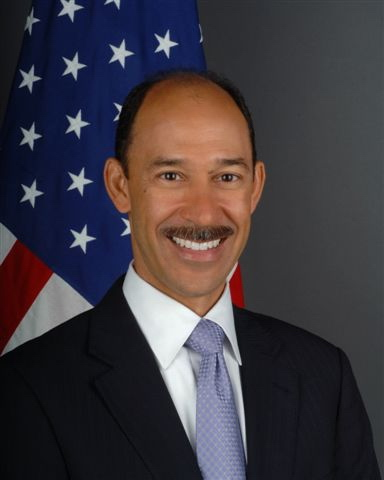

United States Ambassador to the United Arab Emirates
- In office September 19, 2011 – December 16, 2014
- President: Barack Obama
- Preceded by: Richard G. Olson
- Succeeded by: Barbara A. Leaf

Chargé d'affaires to Syria
- In office August 2006 – August 2008
- President: George W. Bush
- Preceded by: Stephen Seche
- Succeeded by: Maura Connelly

Personal details
- Born: 1960 (age 65–66)
- Party: Democrat
- Profession: Diplomat, Career Ambassador

Michael H. Corbin (born 1960) is a United States career foreign service officer and diplomat. He served as the United States Ambassador to the United Arab Emirates. He was nominated to the post on May 9, 2011, confirmed by the U.S. Senate on June 30, and sworn in by Under Secretary of State for Political Affairs William J. Burns on July 25. He arrived in Abu Dhabi on July 27 and presented his credentials to Undersecretary of the Ministry of Foreign Affairs Juma Mubarak Al Junaibi on July 29, and to President Khalifa bin Zayed Al Nahyan on September 19, 2011.

Corbin graduated from Swarthmore College, with a B.A. He served in the Peace Corps in Mauritania from 1982 to 1984. He was Minister Counselor, for Economic and Political Affairs in Egypt from 2003 to 2006. He was Chargé d'Affaires in Syria, from 2006 to 2008. He was Minister Counselor, for Political-Military Affairs in Iraq from 2008 to 2009. He was Deputy Assistant Secretary of State, in the Bureau of Near Eastern Affairs, 2009–11.

Corbin also serves on the board of directors for Caliburn International, a military contractor that oversees operations for Homestead Temporary Shelter for Unaccompanied Children.

Diplomatic posts
Preceded by Stephen Seche	U.S. Chargé d'Affaires ad interim to Syria; 2006–2008	Succeeded by Maura Connelly
Preceded by Richard G. Olson	U.S. Ambassador to the United Arab Emirates; 2011–2014	Succeeded by Barbara A. Leaf
