= Daniel Fried =

American diplomat (born 1952)

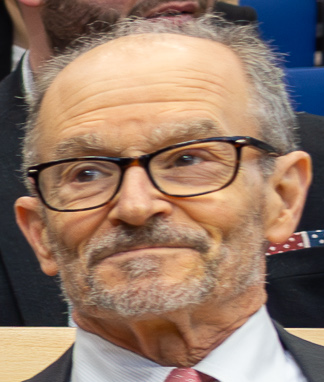

Coordinator for Sanctions Policy
- In office January 28, 2013 – February 27, 2017
- President: Barack Obama; Donald Trump
- Preceded by: Position established
- Succeeded by: James C. O'Brien (2022)

United States Special Envoy for the Closure of the Guantánamo Bay Detention Facility
- In office May 15, 2009 – January 28, 2013
- President: Barack Obama
- Preceded by: Position established
- Succeeded by: Cliff Sloan

23rd Assistant Secretary of State for European and Eurasian Affairs
- In office May 5, 2005 – May 14, 2009
- President: George W. Bush; Barack Obama
- Preceded by: Elizabeth Jones
- Succeeded by: Philip H. Gordon

United States Ambassador to Poland
- In office November 27, 1997 – May 6, 2000
- President: Bill Clinton
- Preceded by: Nicholas Rey
- Succeeded by: Christopher Hill

Personal details
- Born: 1952 (age 73–74)
- Education: Cornell University (BA); Columbia University (MA)

Daniel Fried (born 1952) is an American diplomat who served as the assistant secretary of state for European and Eurasian affairs from 2005 to 2009 and United States ambassador to Poland from 1997 to 2000. He also served as special envoy for Guantanamo closure and co-ordinator for United States embargoes. Fried retired from the State Department in February 2017 after forty years of service.

== Early life and education ==
Daniel Fried was born in New York City to composer Gerald Fried and Judith Pines Fried. He, his sister, and two brothers went to Beverly Hills High School. He received a Bachelor of Arts degree from Cornell University in 1974 and a Master of Arts from the School of International and Public Affairs at Columbia University in 1977.

== Career ==
=== Foreign Service ===
After earning his graduate degree, Fried entered the Foreign Service. He was employed in the Economic Bureau of the State Department from 1977 to 1979; at the U.S. Consulate General in then-Leningrad from 1980 to 1981; as political officer in the U.S. Embassy in Belgrade from 1982 to 1985; and in the Office of Soviet Affairs at the State Department from 1985 to 1987. Ambassador Fried was Polish desk officer at the State Department from 1987 to 1989 as democracy returned to Poland and Central Europe. He served as political counselor in the U.S. Embassy in Warsaw from 1990 to 1993. Between 1993 and 1997 he was on the staff of the National Security Council, ultimately serving as Special Assistant to President Bill Clinton. While working at the White House, Fried played a peripheral role in implementing U.S. policy on Euro-Atlantic security, including NATO enlargement and the Russia–NATO relationship.

He was Ambassador to Poland from November 1997 until May 2000. Between May 2000 and January 2001, Fried was principal deputy special adviser to the secretary of state for the New Independent States. From January 2001 to May 2005, Fried served in an advisory capacity to U.S. President George W. Bush as special assistant to president and also a member of the staff of the United States National Security Council.

From the time of his Senate confirmation in April 2005 until early-2009, Fried served as the top U.S. diplomat responsible for Europe, with the official title assistant secretary of state for European and Eurasian affairs. In that post, Fried helped build and maintain essential relationships with European nations and international organizations such as the European Union and the North Atlantic Treaty Organization.

=== Special envoy for Guantanamo closure ===
Fried served as special envoy for closure of the Guantanamo Bay detention camp starting on May 15, 2009. As special envoy, Fried sat on an inter-agency committee chaired by Attorney General Eric Holder that was to review the remaining captives' cases. His particular mandate was to persuade European countries as well as Yemen to accept for resettlement some of the more than 200 detainees. Fried's position was with the U.S. Department of State and he held a rank equivalent to that of an ambassador, but it has been dubbed "Guantanamo Bay Czar" and "Guantanamo Closure Czar" by the certain media outlets and by public officials such as Republican House Minority Whip Eric Cantor of Virginia who oppose the closure of the detention camp.

Fried's job had been described as the most difficult and thankless job in Washington, due in large part to the virtual ban by Congress on resettling the prisoners on U.S. soil. However, in June 2009, Fried expressed confidence that the facility could be closed by January 23, 2010. However, he conceded in November 2009 that the deadline would be pushed back.

According to Michelle Shephard, writing in the Toronto Star, Fried had a staff of just four: Tony Ricci, Mike Williams, Karen Sasahara and Brock Johnson. Ricci, his deputy, is a retired Colonel; Williams is a lawyer, Sasahara is another diplomat, and Johnson was an Obama campaign worker.

During a trip to Europe in September 2009, Fried described Guantanamo detainees by saying "Some qualify as the worst of the worst, and we are going to put those on trial... if there's such a thing as an average Guanatamo detainee, it's someone who was a volunteer, a low-level trainee or a very low-level fighter in a very bad cause, but not a hardened terrorist, not an organizer - and it is those people who we are asking Europeans to take a look at." As of September 16, 2009, Hungary, France, Ireland and Portugal, Palau and Bermuda had formally agreed to take former Guantanamo detainees, and according to Fried, France, Spain, Italy and Belgium had detainees under consideration.

On January 28, 2013 Charlie Savage, writing in The New York Times reported that Fried would be reassigned, and wrote that according to: "...an internal personnel announcement ... no senior official in President Obama’s second term will succeed Mr. Fried." His duties would be added to those of the senior counsel in the State Department. Savage speculated that the termination of Fried's office was a sign that the Obama administration did not see closure of the prison as realistic.

However, approximately five months later, the Obama administration appointed a new special envoy, Washington lawyer Clifford Sloan, to fill the chief diplomatic role, working in close coordination with a Pentagon-based counterpart, Paul Lewis.

On February 8, 2018, Fried delivered the keynote address at the 21st Johns Hopkins University Model United Nations Conference (JHUMUNC XXI).

== Positions ==
Fried, who has admitted that "for eight years, first in the Bush administration, then in the Obama administration, I helped draft the U.S. government's annual statements on that remembrance," opposed the recognition of the Armenian genocide during the U. S. congressional hearings in March 2007. He stated that the congressional resolution "would undercut those voices emerging in Turkey who call for a truthful exploration of those events in pursuit of Turkey's reconciliation with its own past, and with Armenia," and added, "Our fear is that passage of any such resolution would close minds and harden hearts."

In mid-2008, reporter Helene Cooper of The New York Times wrote that an anonymous administration official described Fried as a foreign policy "hawk" on the issue of whether the U.S. should give military aid to the nation of Georgia in its territorial dispute with Russia.

== See also ==
- Prunes on Line A Guide To Presidential Appointments
- List of czars of the Obama administration

Diplomatic posts
Preceded by Nicholas Rey	United States Ambassador to Poland; 1997–2000	Succeeded by Christopher Hill
New office	United States Special Envoy for the Closure of the Guantánamo Bay Detention Facility; 2009–2013	Succeeded by Cliff Sloan
New office	Coordinator for Sanctions Policy; 2013–2017	
Political offices
Preceded by Elizabeth Jones	Assistant Secretary of State for European and Eurasian Affairs; 2005–2009	Succeeded by Philip H. Gordon
