= Frank A. Rose =

American foreign policy advisor (born 1972)

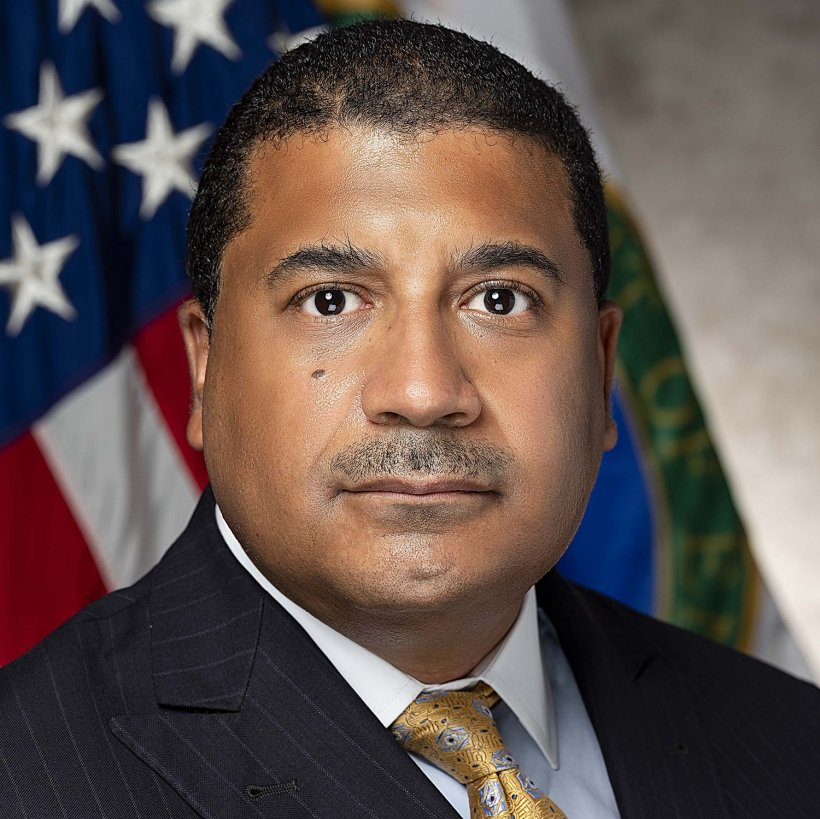

Principal Deputy Administrator of the National Nuclear Security Administration
- In office August 2, 2021 – April 30, 2024
- President: Joe Biden
- Preceded by: William Bookless

3rd Assistant Secretary of State for Arms Control, Verification, and Compliance
- In office December 16, 2014 – January 20, 2017
- President: Barack Obama
- Preceded by: Rose Gottemoeller
- Succeeded by: Yleem D.S. Poblete

Personal details
- Born: 1972 (age 53–54)
- Education: American University (BA); King's College London (MA)

Frank A. Rose (born 1972) served as the Principal Deputy Administrator of the National Nuclear Security Administration in the Biden administration from August 2021 to April 2024. From 2018 to 2021, he was co-director of the Center for Security, Strategy, and Technology at the Brookings Institution. Previously Rose served as the Assistant Secretary of State for Verification, Compliance, and Implementation in the Obama administration from December 2014 to January 2017.

== Biography ==
=== Education ===
Rose received his bachelor's degree in history from American University in 1993. He received a master's degree in war studies from King's College London in 1999.

=== Career ===
Rose began his career on the staff of then-Senator John Kerry and subsequently served as a national security analyst with Science Applications International Corporation. After graduate school, Rose was presidential appointee in the Defense Department during the Clinton Administration.

During the Bush Administration he served as a civil servant in the Department of Defense as a policy advisor. Once he left, Rose served as a professional staff member on the House Intelligence Committee and the House Armed Services Committee.

During the Obama Administration, Rose was appointed to be the Deputy Assistant Secretary of State for Space and Defense Policy from 2009 to 2014. In 2014 Rose was confirmed as the Assistant Secretary of State for Arms Control, Verification, and Compliance. At the conclusion of the Obama administration Rose joined The Aerospace Corporation as their chief of government relations until 2018. In addition to providing commentary on nuclear and space issues, Rose has testified before Congress as an expert witness. Additionally, Rose has also served as an Adjunct Assistant Professor in the Security Studies Program at Georgetown University.

On April 22, 2021, President Biden announced his intent to nominate Rose to be the Principal Deputy Administrator for National Nuclear Security at the Department of Energy. He appeared before the Senate Committee on Armed Services on May 27, 2021, and was confirmed by voice vote of the full Senate on July 29, 2021. Rose was sworn in on August 2, 2021, by Secretary Jennifer Granholm.

In April 2024, he resigned from NNSA to pursue private consultancy. Allegations of having made a joke that some considered sexist formed part of an internal NNSA investigation that led to no charges being leveled against him.

Government offices
Preceded by Rose Gottemoeller	Assistant Secretary of State for Verification, Compliance, and Implementation; December 16, 2014 – January 20, 2017	Succeeded by Yleem Poblete
