= Rose Gottemoeller =

American diplomat (born 1953)

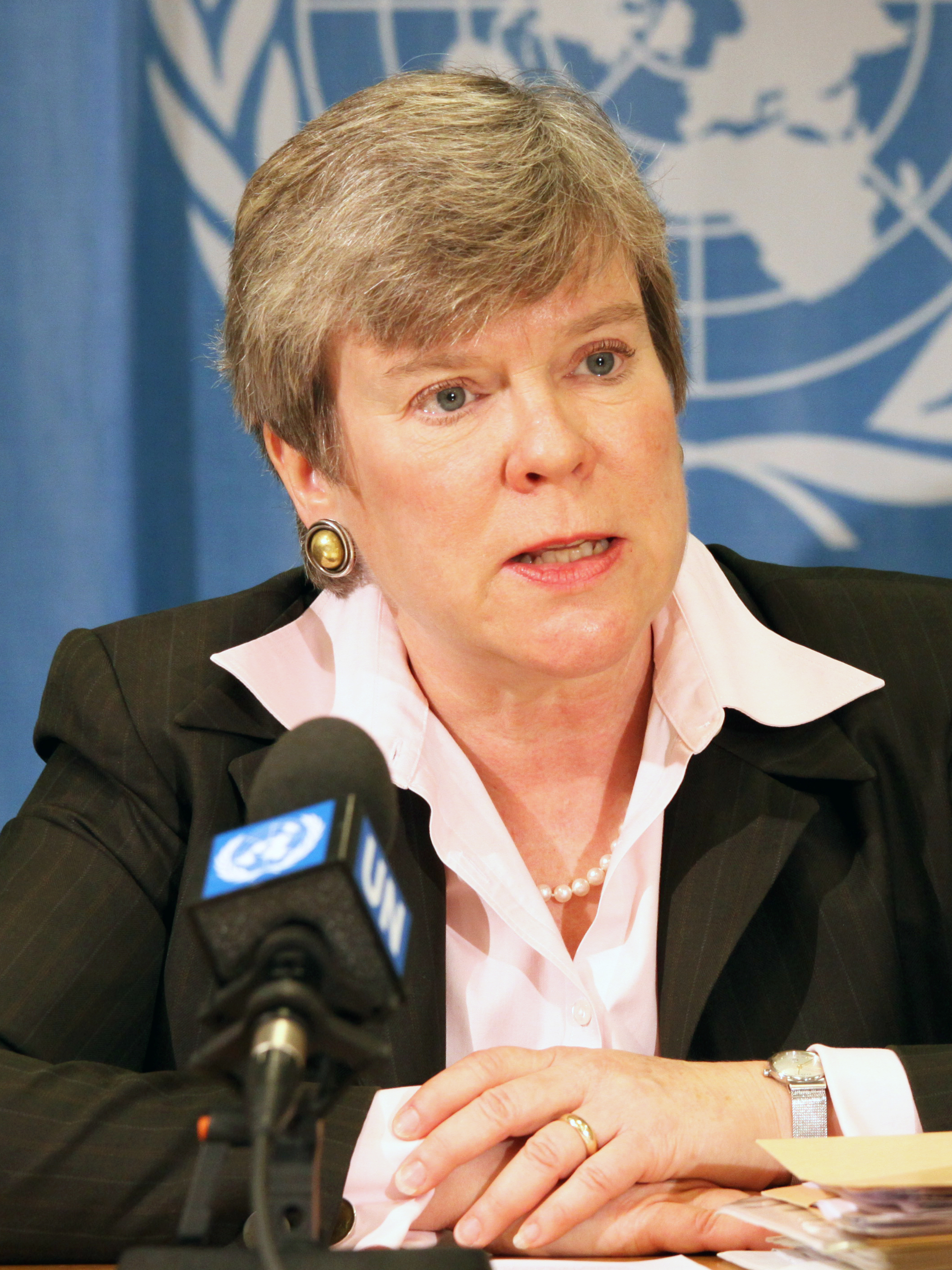
- Gottemoeller in 2011

Deputy Secretary General of NATO
- In office October 17, 2016 – July 17, 2019
- Preceded by: Alexander Vershbow
- Succeeded by: Mircea Geoană

16th Under Secretary of State for Arms Control and International Security Affairs
- In office February 7, 2012 – October 6, 2016; Acting: February 7, 2012 – March 7, 2014
- President: Barack Obama
- Preceded by: Ellen Tauscher
- Succeeded by: Andrea L Thompson

2nd Assistant Secretary of State for Arms Control, Verification, and Compliance
- In office April 6, 2009 – March 6, 2014
- President: Barack Obama
- Preceded by: Paula DeSutter
- Succeeded by: Frank A. Rose

Personal details
- Born: March 24, 1953 (age 73) Columbus, Ohio, U.S.
- Spouse: Raymond Arnaudo
- Children: 2
- Education: Georgetown University (BA); George Washington University (MA)

Rose Eilene Gottemoeller (born March 24, 1953) is an American diplomat who served as Deputy Secretary General of NATO from October 2016 to October 2019 under Secretary General Jens Stoltenberg. Before then she was the Under Secretary of State for Arms Control and International Security at the U.S. State Department.

== Early life and education ==
Originally from Ohio, Gottemoeller received a B.S. from Georgetown University, and an M.A. from George Washington University's Elliott School of International Affairs. She is fluent in Russian.

== Career ==
In the early years of her career, Gottemoeller was a social scientist at RAND and a Council on Foreign Relations International Affairs Fellow. She has taught Soviet military policy and Russian security at Georgetown University.

=== Clinton NSC (1993–1994) ===
From 1993 to 1994, she served on the National Security Council in the White House as director for Russia, Ukraine, and Eurasia Affairs, with responsibility for denuclearization in Ukraine, Kazakhstan, and Belarus.

=== in London (1994–1997) ===
From 1994 to 1997, Gottemoeller served as deputy director of the International Institute for Strategic Studies in London.

=== At the DOE (1997–2000) ===
Gottemoeller first joined the Department of Energy in November 1997 as director of the Office of Nonproliferation and National Security. She rose to become the Deputy Under Secretary of Energy for Defense Nuclear Nonproliferation at the U.S. Department of Energy. She previously held the post of Assistant Secretary for Nonproliferation and National Security, also at the Department of Energy (DOE). At DOE, Gottemoeller was responsible for all nonproliferation cooperation with Russia and the Newly Independent States.

=== Carnegie Endowment (2000–2008) ===
From 2000 she worked at the Carnegie Endowment for International Peace.

Before returning to government, she was a senior associate in the Carnegie Russia & Eurasia Program in Washington, D.C., where she worked on U.S.–Russian relations and nuclear security and stability. While with Carnegie, Gottemoeller led consultative Track II meetings with Russian nuclear experts. She also served as the director of the Carnegie Moscow Center from January 2006 to December 2008.

=== At the State Department (2009–2016) ===
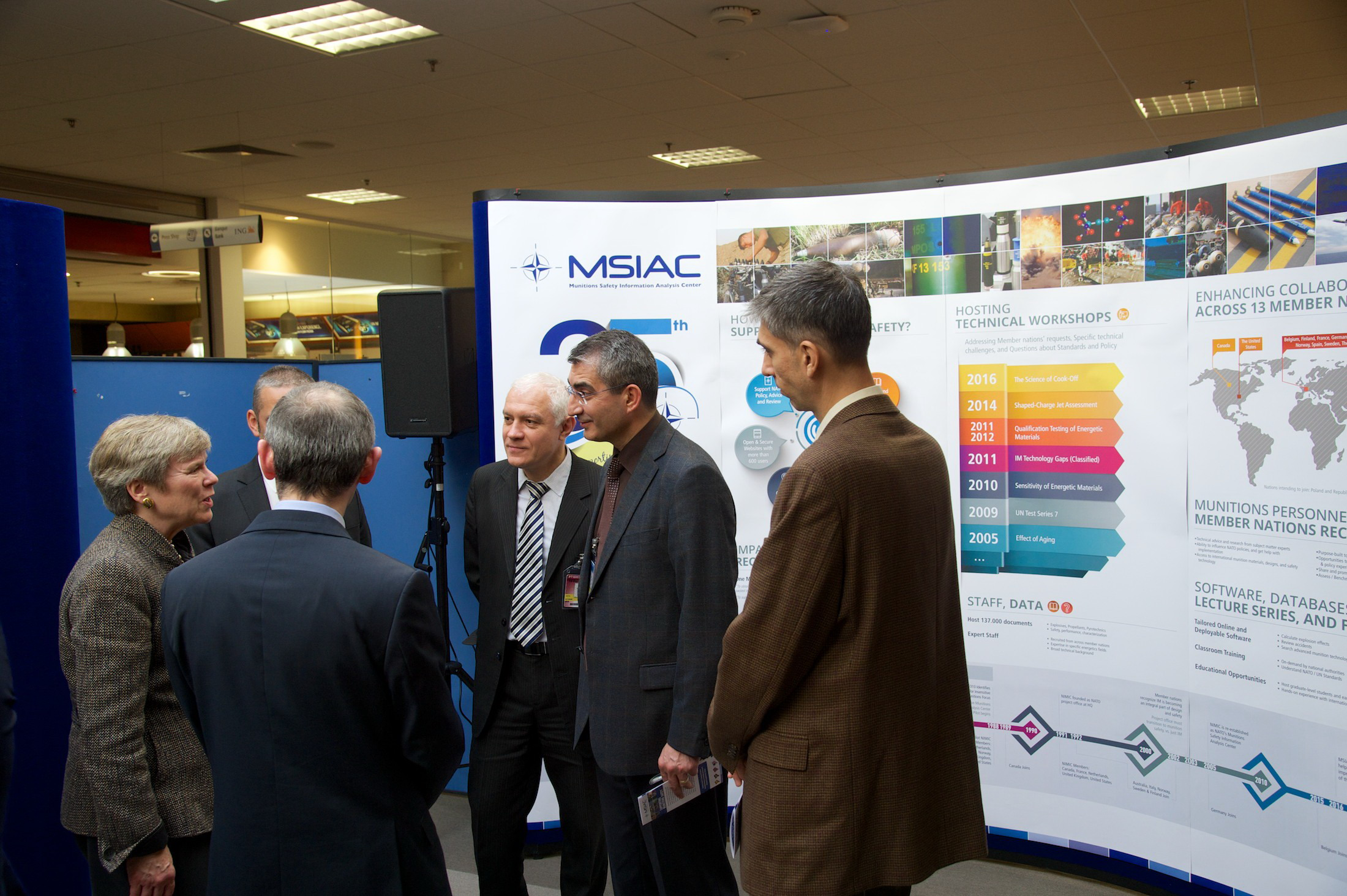
Gottemoeller at the Celebrating 25 Years of MSIAC event (15 December 2016)

Gottemoeller was confirmed as Under Secretary of State by the U.S. Senate on March 6, 2014. Prior to her confirmation, she had served as the Acting Under Secretary of State in the same capacity since February 7, 2012, in addition to her role as the United States Department of State's Assistant Secretary for Arms Control, Verification, and Compliance, which she held since April 6, 2009. She was the chief negotiator of the follow on for the Strategic Arms Reductions Treaty otherwise known as the New Strategic Arms Reduction Treaty (New START) with the Russian Federation (in Russia, the treaty is known as START III). Her experience is described in a book, Negotiating the New START Treaty, published by Cambria Press in May 2021.

On August 6, 2015, Gottemoeller was the first senior U.S. official to attend the memorial of the atomic bombing of Hiroshima, Japan by the United States in World War II. It commemorated the 70th anniversary of the bombing and Gottemoeller was accompanied by U.S. ambassador Caroline Kennedy; Kennedy was the second U.S. ambassador to attend the annual memorial. Japan's prime minister Shinzo Abe and representatives of 100 countries were in attendance. Abe reiterated Japan's policy which is in favor of the abolition of nuclear weapons. Japan had hoped for U.S. president Barack Obama to attend the memorial; the country has a standing call for the U.S. to apologize for the bombings.

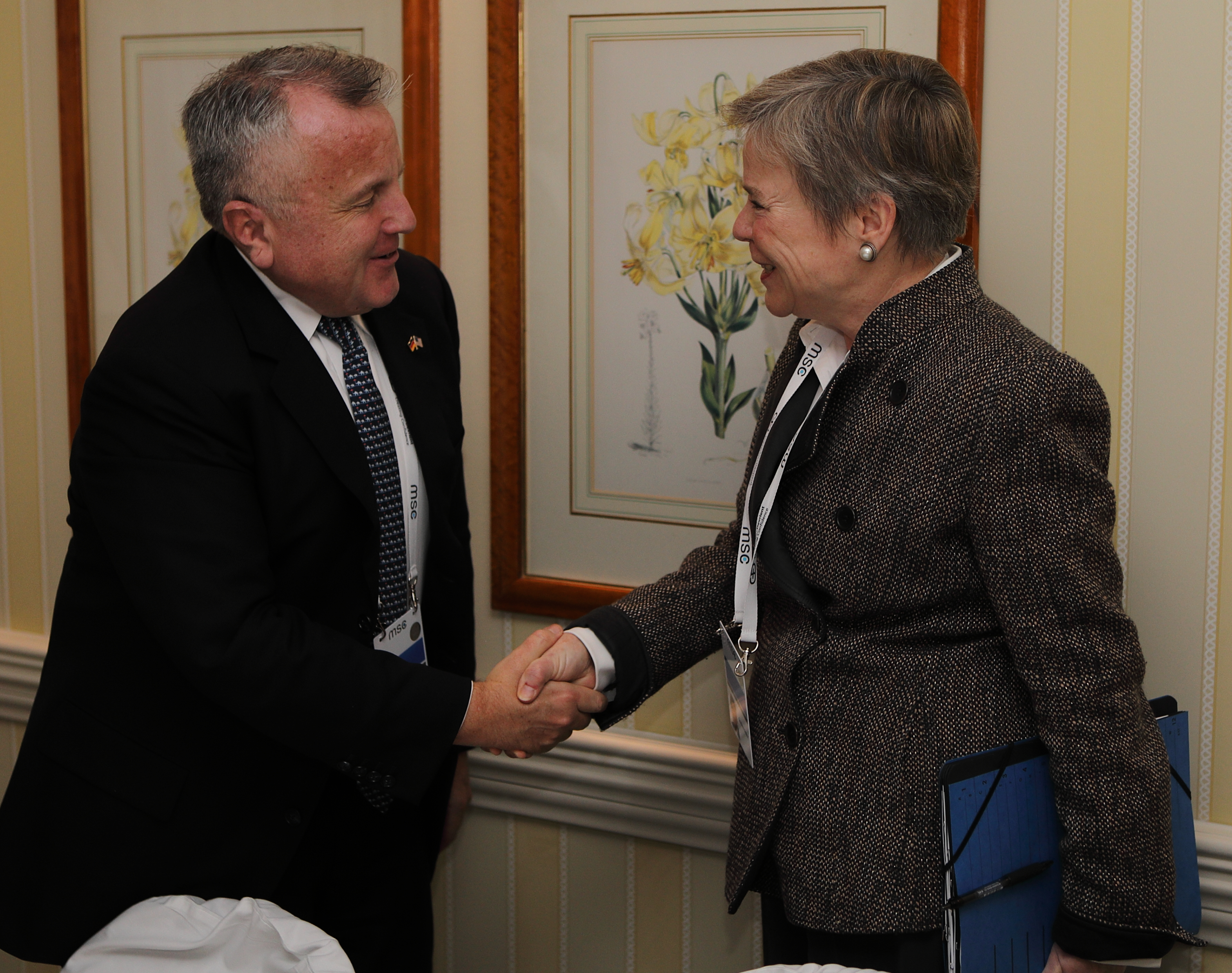
Gottemoeller greets U.S. Deputy Secretary of State John Sullivan in Munich in 2018

=== Deputy Secretary-General of NATO (2016–2019) ===
Gottemoeller became the first female Deputy Secretary General of the North Atlantic Treaty Organization on October 17, 2016.

=== Post-government career ===
After leaving NATO, Gottemoeller joined Stanford University's Freeman Spogli Institute for International Studies and its Center for International Security and Cooperation as a distinguished lecturer.

=== Awards ===
- Order of the Golden Fleece – Georgia, 2019.

Political offices
Preceded by Paula DeSutter	Assistant Secretary of State for Verification, Compliance, and Implementation; 2009–2014	Succeeded by Frank Rose
Preceded by Ellen Tauscher	Under Secretary of State for Arms Control and International Security Affairs; 2012–2016; Acting: 2012–2014	Succeeded by Andrea L Thompson
