= Yleem Poblete =

American government official

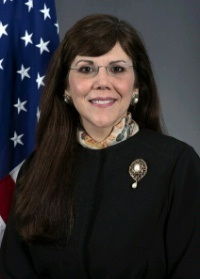

4th Assistant Secretary of State for Arms Control, Verification, and Compliance
- In office April 30, 2018 – June 7, 2019
- President: Donald Trump
- Preceded by: Frank A. Rose
- Succeeded by: Mallory Stewart (2022)

Personal details
- Spouse: Jason Poblete
- Education: Saint Thomas University (BA); University of Miami (MA); Catholic University (PhD)

Yleem D.S. Poblete is a former American government official who served as the United States Assistant Secretary of State for Verification, Compliance, and Implementation from April 30, 2018 to June 7, 2019 . Poblete previously served as the Chief of Staff of the House Foreign Affairs Committee, where she worked for close to 20 years.

== Biography ==
A member of the transition team starting in 2016, Poblete first joined the State Department in 2017 as a senior advisor and later nominated by President Donald Trump to serve as the Assistant Secretary of State for Arms Control Verification and Compliance. She has over two decades in the U.S. House of Representatives, mostly on the Committee on Foreign Affairs staff where she served as Chief of Staff.

According to Poblete's official State Department biography, "During her tenure on the Foreign Affairs Committee, Poblete worked on virtually every regional and functional issue and spearheaded scores of legislative efforts to advance a range of U.S. foreign policy and national security priorities, including laws designed to counter proliferation, to hold violators accountable, and to compel the disarmament of rogue states such as Iran, North Korea, and Syria."

Poblete's congressional career began in 1995, working for Rep. Ileana Ros-Lehtinen (R-Florida), for whose campaigns Poblete had been volunteering since age 8. Poblete started with the House as a staffer for the House Committee on International Relations Subcommittee on the Middle East and Central Asia. She also served on the Subcommittee on International Economic Policy and Trade and the Subcommittee on International Operations and Human Rights.

Poblete has been a fellow at the Institute for Policy Research and Catholic Studies; guest lecturer at private, public, and USG academic institutions; and presenter at foreign policy forums. She has been interviewed by U.S. and foreign media on national security and U.S. foreign policy matters; and has been published in The Wall Street Journal, The National Interest, National Review, The Hill, The Washington Times, and The Times of Israel, among others.

During her tenure on the Foreign Affairs Committee staff, Poblete worked on virtually every regional and functional issue, assessing security challenges and developing a range of policy responses. She spearheaded Congressional oversight into waste, fraud, and abuse in programs under the committee's jurisdiction. Some notable examples resulting in verifiable efforts to address the wrongs include: holding accountable American contractors and United Nations peacekeepers involved in sexual abuse in Bosnia and Africa; halting U.S. funds to the International Atomic Energy Agency (IAEA) from contributing to the provision of IAEA technical assistance to Iran, Syria, and North Korea while these pariah states were subject to a broad range of U.S. and multilateral sanctions; investigating and holding accountable those responsible for the illegal transfers by the World Intellectual Property Organization of U.S.-origin technology to North Korea and Iran.

Poblete holds a B.A., an M.A, and a Ph.D. in International Relations. Her doctoral dissertation focused on: "The Viability of Sanctions as Effective Foreign Policy Tools: The Cases of Iran and Syria."

Government offices
Preceded by Frank A. Rose	Assistant Secretary of State for Verification, Compliance, and Implementation; April 17, 2018 – June 7, 2019	Succeeded by Mallory Stewart
