= Maura Connelly =

American diplomat

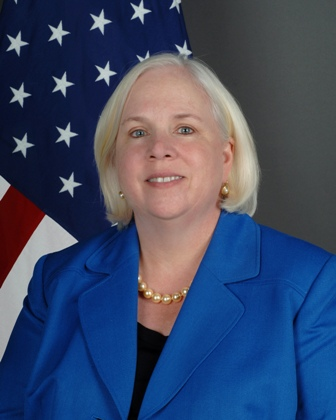
- Official portrait, 2010

United States Ambassador to Lebanon
- In office September 15, 2010 – August 20, 2013
- President: Barack Obama
- Preceded by: Michele J. Sison
- Succeeded by: David Hale

Chargé d'Affaires ad interim to Syria
- In office 2008–2010
- President: George W. Bush
- Preceded by: Michael H. Corbin
- Succeeded by: Robert Stephen Ford

Personal details
- Profession: Diplomat

Maura Connelly is an American diplomat. President Obama nominated Ambassador Connelly, a 25-year veteran of the Foreign Service, as the U.S. ambassador to the Republic of Lebanon in June 2010. Ambassador Connelly was confirmed by the Senate in August 2010 and sworn in by Secretary of State Hillary Clinton in September 2010. She officially presented her diplomatic credentials to Lebanese President Michel Sleiman as the 25th U.S. Ambassador to the Republic of Lebanon on September 15, 2010.

== Biography ==
Ambassador Connelly received a B.S. in Foreign Service from Georgetown University and a Masters in National Security Studies from the U.S. Naval War College. A native of Jersey City, New Jersey, Ambassador Connelly first went to Washington, DC to serve as a Page in the U.S. House of Representatives from 1975 to 1977.

Maura Connelly is a career member of the Senior Foreign Service and most recently served in the Bureau of Near Eastern Affairs as Deputy Assistant Secretary responsible for the Levant and Egypt. Prior to that, Ambassador Connelly was the Chargé d'affaires of the U.S. Embassy in Damascus, Syria from 2008 to 2009. Ambassador Connelly previously served as the Political Minister-Counselor at the U.S. Embassy in London, U.K. between 2005 and 2008. From 2003 to 2005, Ambassador Connelly was the Deputy Principal Officer at the U.S. Consulate General in Jerusalem, where she also served from 1993 to 1996 as Political Section Chief. She has also served as the Deputy Counselor for Political Affairs for the U.S. Mission to the United Nations in New York. Her other overseas postings include Jordan, Algeria and South Africa.

Diplomatic posts
Preceded by Michael H. Corbin	United States Chargé d'Affaires ad interim to Syria; 2008–2010	Succeeded by Robert Stephen Ford
Preceded by Michele J. Sison	United States Ambassador to Lebanon; 2010–2013	Succeeded by David Hale
