= United States Foreign Service Career Ambassador =

Personal rank of Foreign Service officers

Career ambassador is a personal rank of Foreign Service officers within the United States Department of State Senior Foreign Service. The rank of career ambassador is awarded by nomination of the president and confirmation by the United States Senate. According to the Department of State:

The class of Career Ambassador was first established by an Act of Congress on Aug 5, 1955, as an amendment to the Foreign Service act of 1946 (P.L. 84-250; 69 Stat. 537). Under its provisions, the President with the advice and consent of the Senate was empowered to appoint individuals to the class who had (1) served at least 15 years in a position of responsibility in a government agency, including at least 3 years as a Career Minister; (2) rendered exceptionally distinguished service to the government; and (3) met other requirements prescribed by the Secretary of State. Under the 1980 Foreign Service Act (P.L. 96-465; 94 Stat. 2084), which repealed the 1946 Act as amended, the President is empowered with the advice and consent of the Senate to confer the personal rank of Career Ambassador upon a career member of the Senior Foreign Service in recognition of especially distinguished service over a sustained period.

== List of career ambassadors ==
Listed by date of appointment. Names on this list are drawn from the U.S. Department of State's list of career ambassadors, except where another reference is given.

- H. Freeman Matthews (1956)
- Loy W. Henderson (1956)
- Robert Daniel Murphy (1956)
- James Clement Dunn (1956)
- George V. Allen (1960)
- Raymond A. Hare (1960)
- Livingston T. Merchant (1960)
- James Williams Riddleberger (1960)
- Ellis O. Briggs (1960)
- Llewellyn Thompson (1960)
- Charles E. Bohlen (1960)
- Frances E. Willis (1962)
- Walter C. Dowling (1962)
- William Walton Butterworth (1962)
- U. Alexis Johnson (1964)
- Charles Yost (1964)
- Douglas MacArthur II (1964)
- Foy D. Kohler (1964)
- Winthrop G. Brown (1969)
- Edwin M. Martin (1969)
- Walworth Barbour (1969)
- Charles Burke Elbrick (1969)
- Alfred Atherton (1981)
- Arthur W. Hummel Jr. (1981)
- Walter J. Stoessel Jr. (1981)
- Lawrence Eagleburger (1984)
- Arthur A. Hartman (1984)
- Thomas R. Pickering (1984)
- Ronald I. Spiers (1984)
- Richard W. Murphy (1985)
- Deane R. Hinton (1987)
- George S. Vest (1987)
- Terence Todman (1989)
- Morton I. Abramowitz (1989)
- Herman Jay Cohen (1992)
- Frank G. Wisner (1995)
- J. Stapleton Roy (1996)
- Mary A. Ryan (1999)
- George Moose (2002)
- Ruth A. Davis (2002)
- Jeffrey Davidow (2002)
- A. Elizabeth Jones (2004)
- Johnny Young (2004)
- Alan Larson (2004)
- Ryan Crocker (2004)
- Marc Grossman (2004)
- Richard A. Boucher (2008)
- David Welch (2008)
- Anne W. Patterson (2008)
- William J. Burns (2008)
- James Franklin Jeffrey (2011)
- Nancy Jo Powell (2011)
- Earl Anthony Wayne (2011)
- Kristie Kenney (2012)
- William R. Brownfield (2012)
- Thomas A. Shannon Jr. (2012)
- Stephen D. Mull (2016)
- Victoria Nuland (2016)
- Philip S. Goldberg (2018)
- David Hale (2018)
- Michele J. Sison (2018)
- Daniel Bennett Smith (2018)
- John R. Bass (2024)
- Brian A. Nichols (2024)

== See also ==
- Senior Foreign Service
- Diplomatic rank
- Ambassadors of the United States
