= Michele J. Sison =

American diplomat (born 1959)

Michele Sison
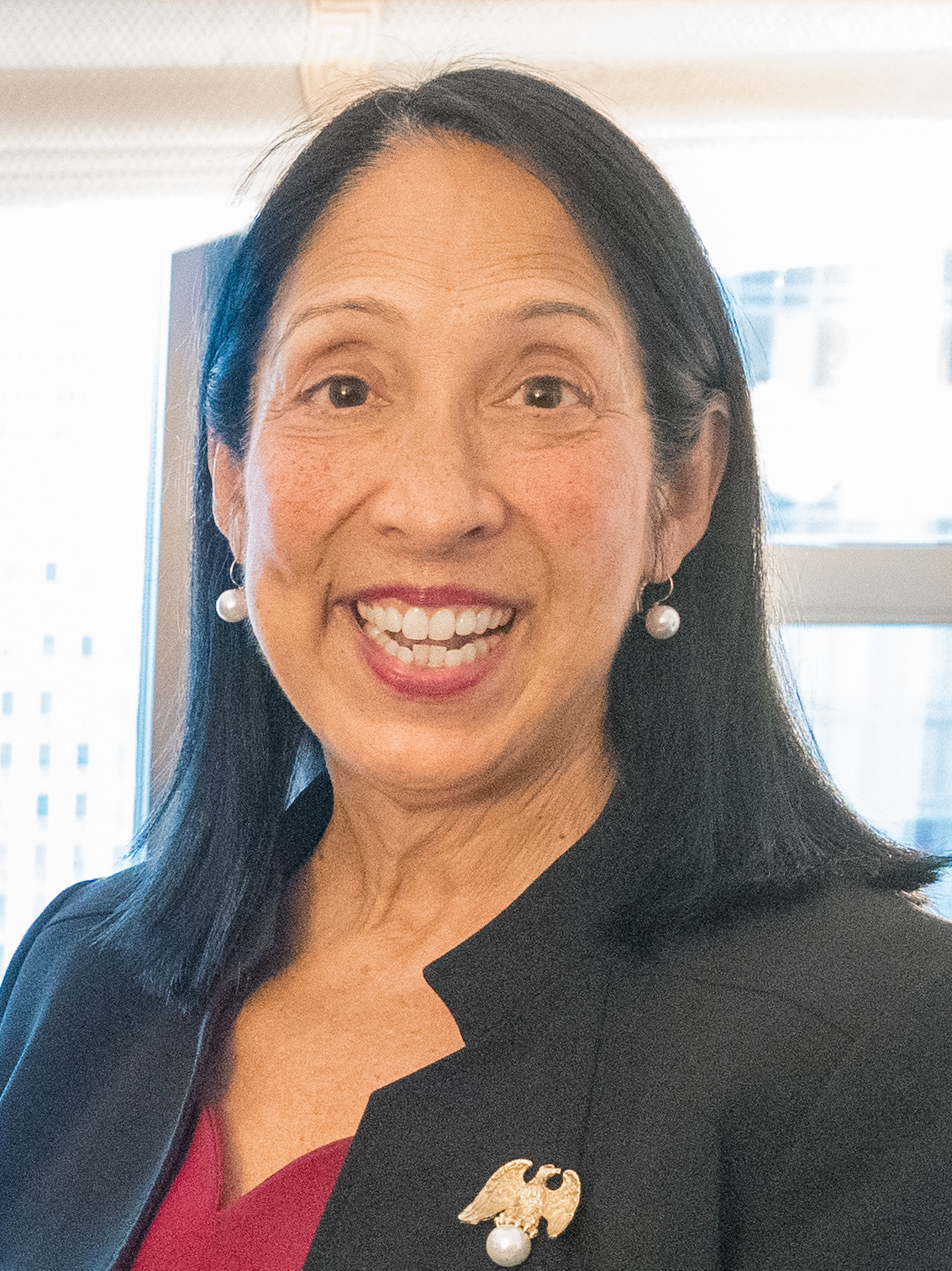

28th Assistant Secretary of State for International Organization Affairs
- In office December 21, 2021 – January 20, 2025
- President: Joe Biden
- Preceded by: Kevin Moley
- Succeeded by: McCoy Pitt (acting)

United States Ambassador to Haiti
- In office February 21, 2018 – October 9, 2021
- President: Donald Trump; Joe Biden
- Preceded by: Peter Mulrean
- Succeeded by: Dennis B. Hankins (2024)

United States Deputy Ambassador to the United Nations
- In office December 7, 2014 – February 21, 2018
- President: Barack Obama; Donald Trump
- Preceded by: Rosemary DiCarlo
- Succeeded by: Jonathan Cohen

United States Ambassador to the United Nations Acting
- In office January 20, 2017 – January 27, 2017
- President: Donald Trump
- Preceded by: Samantha Power
- Succeeded by: Nikki Haley

United States Ambassador to Sri Lanka
- In office September 14, 2012 – December 6, 2014
- President: Barack Obama
- Preceded by: Patricia A. Butenis
- Succeeded by: Atul Keshap

United States Ambassador to the Maldives
- In office September 9, 2012 – December 6, 2014
- President: Barack Obama
- Preceded by: Patricia A. Butenis
- Succeeded by: Atul Keshap

United States Ambassador to Lebanon
- In office January 25, 2008 – August 9, 2010; Acting: January 25, 2008 – September 4, 2008
- President: George W. Bush; Barack Obama
- Preceded by: Jeffrey D. Feltman
- Succeeded by: Maura Connelly

United States Ambassador to the United Arab Emirates
- In office February 7, 2005 – January 19, 2008
- President: George W. Bush
- Preceded by: Marcelle Wahba
- Succeeded by: Martin Quinn

Personal details
- Born: Michele Jeanne Sison; May 27, 1959 (age 67) Arlington, Virginia, U.S.
- Education: Wellesley College (BA); London School of Economics (attended)

Michele Jeanne Sison (born May 27, 1959) is an American diplomat and career member of the Senior Foreign Service who had served as the assistant secretary of state for international organization affairs. She has previously served in various other diplomatic posts around the world on behalf of the United States, including ambassador to Haiti. Sison holds the personal rank of career ambassador.

== Early life and education ==
Sison earned her Bachelor of Arts in political science from Wellesley College, and also studied at the London School of Economics.

== Career ==
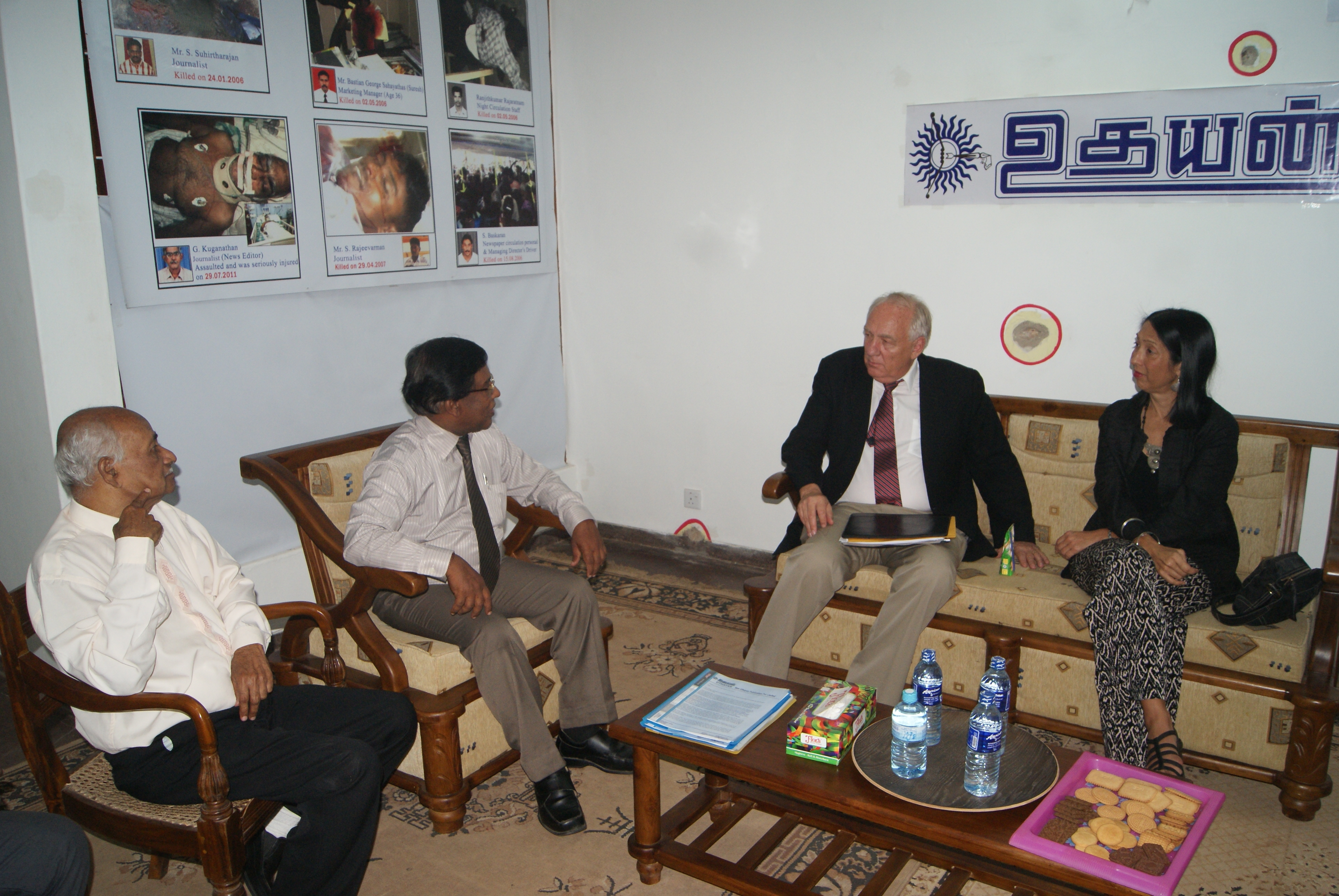
Stephen J. Rapp, the United States Ambassador-at-Large for War Crimes Issues, and Michele J. Sison talking with E. Saravanapavan in Jaffna on 8 January 2014. Some of the bullet holes and portraits of slain staff are visible on the wall behind them.

Sison's overseas assignments have included service as deputy chief of mission and chargé d'affaires at the U.S. embassy in Islamabad, Pakistan (1999–2002) and as consul general at the U.S. consulate general in Chennai, India (1996–1999). She also served at the U.S. missions in Abidjan, Côte d'Ivoire (1993–1996); Douala, Cameroon (1991–1993); Cotonou, Benin (1988–1991); Lomé, Togo (1984–1988); and Port-au-Prince, Haiti (1982–1984), as well as in Washington. Ambassador Sison is the recipient of numerous U.S. Department of State awards for exceptional service.

She was confirmed by the U.S. Senate as United States ambassador to the United Arab Emirates on May 6, 2004, and sworn in by Secretary of State Colin Powell on July 12, 2004. In 2005, during her time as ambassador to the United Arab Emirates, she was named 'Abolitionist Ambassador of the Year' for her work with the U.A.E government in rescuing victims of child trafficking.

Prior to her appointment to the UAE, she served as Principal Deputy Assistant Secretary in the Bureau of South Asian Affairs, charged with providing broad policy oversight of U.S. relations with Pakistan, Afghanistan, Bangladesh, India, Nepal, and Sri Lanka.

She also had a short stint as the U.S. Chargés d'affaires a.i. in Lebanon, before her Senate confirmation as U.S. Ambassador to Lebanon on August 1, 2008. Sison's assignment in Lebanon ended in August 2010.

She was confirmed by the U.S. Senate on June 29, 2012, as U.S. Ambassador to Sri Lanka and the Maldives.

On July 8, 2014, President Barack Obama announced the nomination of Sison as Deputy Representative of the United States to the United Nations, with the rank of Ambassador, and Deputy Representative of the United States in the Security Council of the United Nations. She was confirmed by the Senate in a voice vote on November 19, 2014.

=== Ambassador to Haiti ===
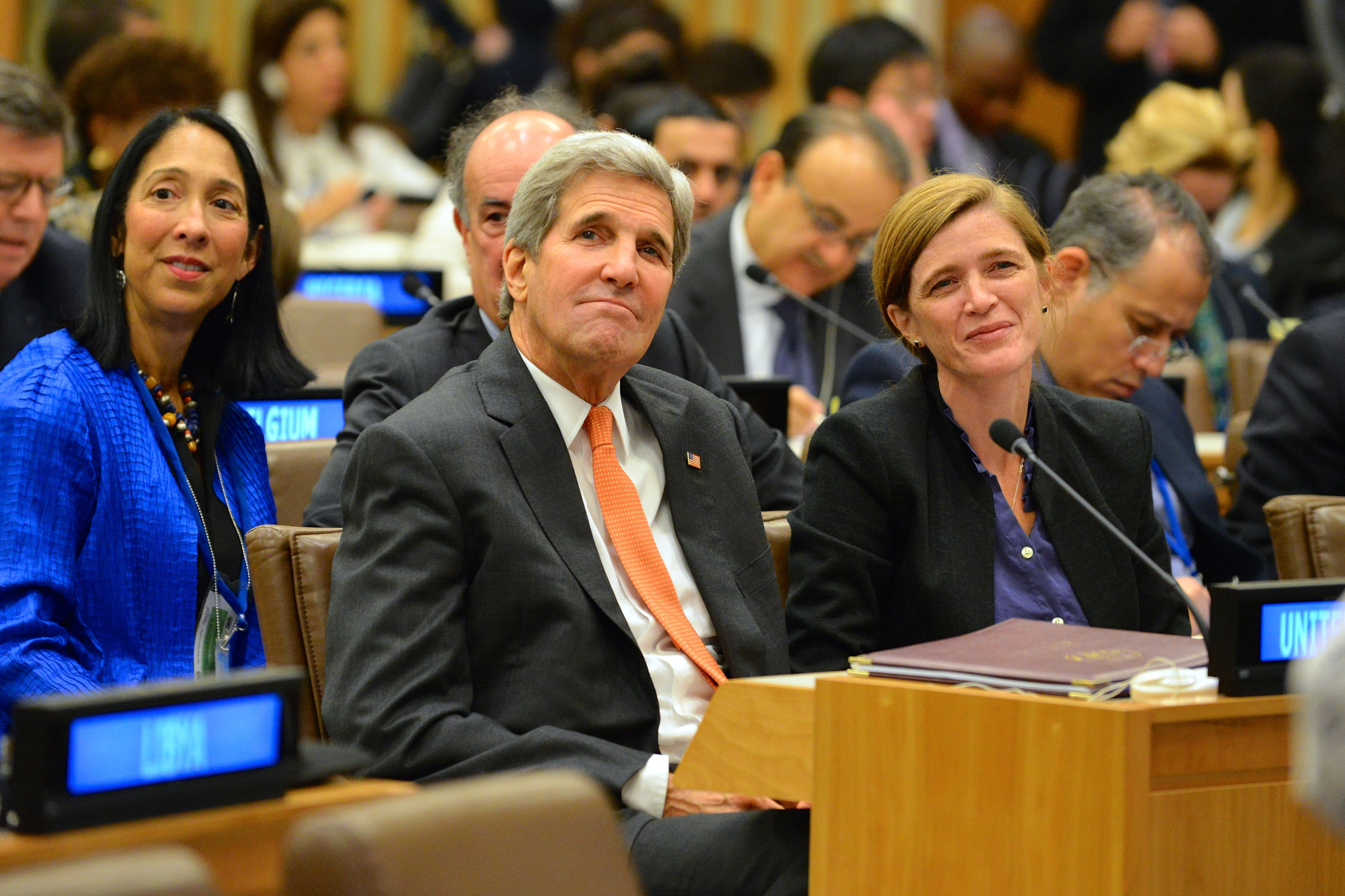
Sison at the United Nations with John Kerry and Samantha Power.

On November 2, 2017, she was confirmed by the Senate to serve as the United States Ambassador to Haiti, having been nominated by U.S. President Donald Trump. Among the major issues facing her in her role were navigating a response by the United Nations to victims of a cholera epidemic the organization started in October 2010. She was also confronted with the U.S. government's decision on whether or not to extend Temporary Protected Status to Haitian immigrants who were in the U.S. at the time of the massive earthquake in Port-au-Prince in January 2010.

In 2018, Sison was promoted to the personal rank of Career Ambassador, the highest personal rank in the Senior Foreign Service, given for exceptionally distinguished service over a prolonged period of time.

Sison left the post on October 9, 2021, and was succeeded by Chargé d’Affaires, a.i., Kenneth H. Merten.

=== Assistant Secretary of State for International Organization Affairs ===
On April 15, 2021, Sison was nominated by President Biden to serve as Assistant Secretary of State for International Organization Affairs. Sison's nomination was reported favorably on June 24, 2021, by the Senate's Foreign Relations Committee. She was confirmed to the position by the Senate on December 18, 2021, by voice vote, and she was sworn in on December 21, 2021.

== Personal life ==
Sison speaks fluent French and basic Haitian Creole and Arabic. She has two daughters. Her father is originally from the Philippines.

Diplomatic posts
| Preceded by Marcelle Wahba | United States Ambassador to the United Arab Emirates; 2005–2008 | Succeeded by Martin Quinn |
| Preceded by Jeffrey D. Feltman | United States Ambassador to Lebanon; 2008–2010 | Succeeded by Maura Connelly |
| Preceded by Patricia A. Butenis | United States Ambassador to Sri Lanka; 2012–2014 | Succeeded by Atul Keshap |
| Preceded by Patricia A. Butenis | United States Ambassador to the Maldives; 2012–2014 | Succeeded by Atul Keshap |
| Preceded by Rosemary DiCarlo | United States Deputy Representative to the United Nations; 2014–2018 | Succeeded by Jonathan Cohen |
| Preceded by Samantha Power | United States Ambassador to the United Nations; Acting; 2017 | Succeeded by Nikki Haley |
| Preceded by Peter Mulrean | United States Ambassador to Haiti; 2018–2021 | Succeeded by Kenneth H. Merten; Acting |
