= David Hale (diplomat) =

American diplomat (born 1961)

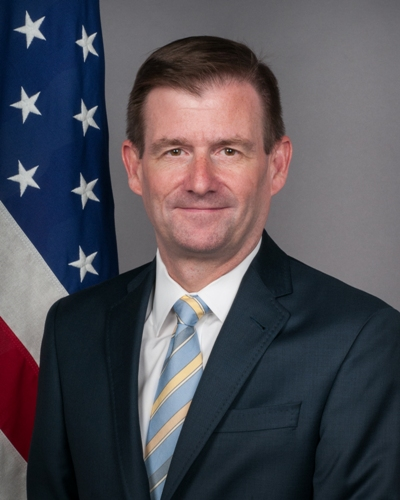
- Official portrait, 2013

23rd Under Secretary of State for Political Affairs
- In office August 30, 2018 – May 3, 2021
- President: Donald Trump; Joe Biden
- Secretary: Mike Pompeo; Antony Blinken
- Preceded by: Stephen Mull
- Succeeded by: Victoria Nuland

30th United States Ambassador to Pakistan
- In office December 3, 2015 – August 29, 2018
- President: Barack Obama; Donald Trump
- Preceded by: Richard Olson
- Succeeded by: Donald Blome (2022)

United States Ambassador to Lebanon
- In office September 6, 2013 – October 31, 2015
- President: Barack Obama
- Preceded by: Maura Connelly
- Succeeded by: Elizabeth H. Richard

United States Special Envoy for Middle East Peace
- In office May 18, 2011 – June 24, 2013
- President: Barack Obama
- Preceded by: George Mitchell
- Succeeded by: Frank Lowenstein (acting)

United States Ambassador to Jordan
- In office November 7, 2005 – July 9, 2008; Acting: July 12, 2004 – November 7, 2005
- President: George W. Bush
- Preceded by: David Satterfield
- Succeeded by: Robert Beecroft

Personal details
- Born: David Maclain Hale; 1961 (age 64–65) Ann Arbor, Michigan, U.S.
- Education: Georgetown University (BSFS)

David Maclain Hale (born 1961) is an American diplomat and career ambassador, who previously served as the United States Under Secretary of State for Political Affairs. He is currently a Distinguished Diplomatic Fellow at the Middle East Institute. He will also be teaching a course in diplomacy at the Institute for World Politics in Fall 2025. His book, "American Diplomacy toward Lebanon: Lessons in Foreign Policy and the Middle East" was published by Bloomsbury/I.B. Tauris in February 2024 as part of the Middle East Institute policy series. Hale retired from the State Department in 2022. He was previously a Global Fellow at the Wilson Center's Middle East program.

== Early life ==
David Hale was born in Ann Arbor, Michigan in 1961 and lives in Washington, DC. He graduated from Georgetown University's School of Foreign Service in 1983.

== Career ==
Hale joined the Foreign Service in 1984. He served at American diplomatic missions in Saudi Arabia, Bahrain, Tunisia, Jordan, Lebanon, the United Nations, and Israel. In Washington, Hale was Deputy Assistant Secretary of State for Israel, Egypt and the Levant and Director for Israel-Palestinian Affairs. He held several staff posts, including Executive Assistant to Secretary of State Albright.

Hale was United States Ambassador to the Hashemite Kingdom of Jordan between 2005 and 2008. He was Deputy Envoy from 2009 to 2012, and Special Envoy for Middle East Peace between 2011 and 2013. He served as the United States Ambassador to Lebanon from 2013 to 2015.

Hale was the United States Ambassador to Pakistan from August 5, 2015 to August 30, 2018.

Hale is the recipient of several Department Superior and Meritorious Honor awards including one presidential distinguished and two meritorious rank awards; the Secretary of State's distinguished service award; State Department superior and meritorious honor awards; the Philip C. Habib Award for Distinguished Public Service from the American Task Force for Lebanon; and, Jordan's Order of Istiqlal.

In July 2018, President Donald Trump announced his intention to nominate Hale as the next Under Secretary of State for Political Affairs. During the Legislative day of August 28, 2018, he was confirmed by a voice vote.

On September 13, 2018, Hale was appointed to the lifetime rank of Career Ambassador – a Senate confirmed position that is the most senior rank in the State Department, and equivalent to a four-star general.

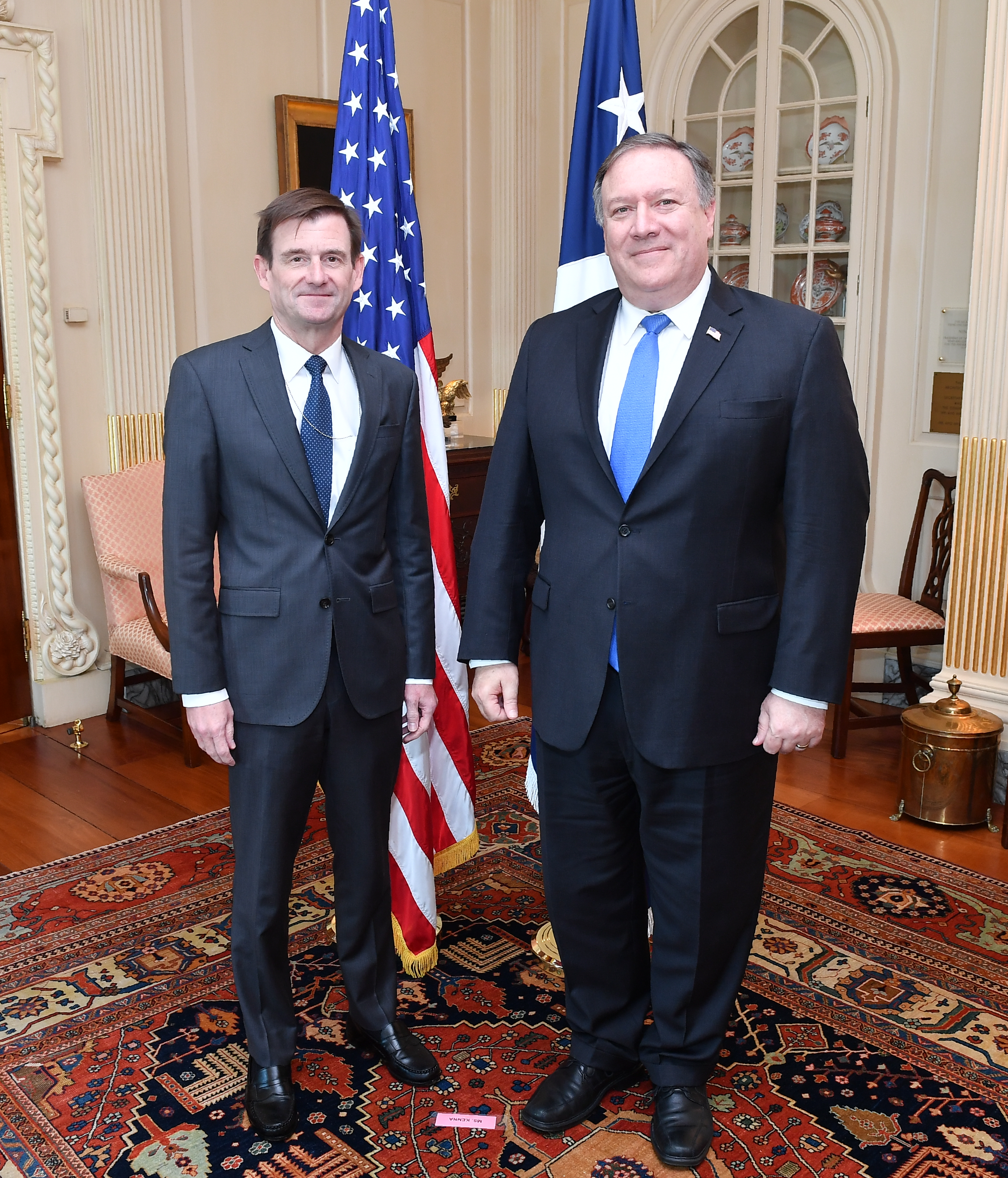
Hale with Secretary of State Mike Pompeo on August 30, 2018

=== Service as Under Secretary ===
In early 2020, Under Secretary Hale visited West Africa to advance US diplomatic interests in the Sahel.

In September 2020, Hale testified that a potential sale of F-35 fighter aircraft to the United Arab Emirates would be discussed with Israel in light of US policy goals to maintain an advantage for Israel in the area.

In 2021, Victoria Nuland was nominated by President Joe Biden to serve as Under Secretary for Political Affairs in the new administration. Hale consequently stepped down from the position and was detailed to the Wilson Center, a policy think-tank based in Washington D.C, as a Distinguished Diplomatic Fellow. Upon his resignation as Under Secretary, he ceded his status as the highest-ranking U.S. Foreign Service Officer, a position held by the officer serving in the highest political appointment in the Department (usually Deputy Secretary or Under Secretary for Political Affairs) irrespective of years of service.

=== Testifying in impeachment inquiry ===
Hale appeared before House investigators on November 6, 2019 with regard to the impeachment inquiry. Hale came to the attention of the impeachment inquiry when Philip Reeker testified about support for Ambassador Marie Yovanovitch being suppressed after President Donald Trump had her removed as ambassador to Ukraine. Mr. Reeker's deputy, George P. Kent, voiced misgivings about Rudy Giuliani’s role in Ukraine matters to Reeker and Hale, according to documents from the State Department's inspector general.

External videos
- Testimony of Hale and Laura Cooper to the House Intelligence Committee, November 20, 2019, C-SPAN

On November 20, 2019, Hale testified that an Office of Management and Budget (OMB) official informed him that Trump ordered aid to be withheld from Ukraine.

== See also ==
- List of ambassadors of the United States

Diplomatic posts
Preceded by David Satterfield	United States Ambassador to Jordan; 2004–2008; Acting: 2004–2005	Succeeded by Robert Beecroft
Preceded by George Mitchell	United States Special Envoy for Middle East Peace; 2011–2013	Succeeded by Martin Indyk as United States Special Envoy for Israeli-Palestinian Negotiations
Preceded by Maura Connelly	United States Ambassador to Lebanon; 2013–2015	Succeeded by Elizabeth Richard
Preceded by Richard Olson	United States Ambassador to Pakistan; 2015–2018	Succeeded by John Hoover; Acting
Political offices
Preceded by Stephen Mull	Under Secretary of State for Political Affairs; 2018–2021	Succeeded by Victoria Nuland
