= Cliff Sloan =

American diplomat and attorney

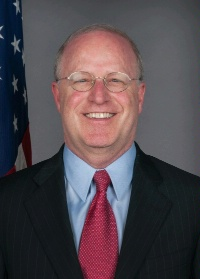
Portrait of Clifford Sloan

Clifford Sloan is an attorney and American diplomat who served as Special Envoy for Guantanamo Closure at the United States Department of State. Sloan is currently a Dean's Visiting Scholar at Georgetown University Law Center and retired partner for Skadden, Arps, Slate, Meagher & Flom LLP and Affiliates. Previously, Sloan was the publisher of Slate magazine.

== Education ==
Sloan graduated from New Trier High School in Winnetka, Illinois, in 1975 and was senior class president and editor-in-chief of the yearbook. He earned a Bachelor of Arts degree from Harvard College in 1979 and a Juris Doctor from Harvard Law School in 1984.

== Career ==
In 1979 he began working as executive assistant to Congressman Sidney R. Yates, D-Ill. During his time at Harvard Law, Sloan and classmate Eliot Spitzer assisted Alan Dershowitz with the Claus von Bülow murder case. In the 1990 movie Reversal of Fortune, about the case, Sloan and Spitzer are portrayed by Felicity Huffman and Annabella Sciorra. After his time at Harvard Law, he served as a Supreme Court clerk for Justice John Paul Stevens.

In 1987, he went to work as an associate to Ken Starr in the Office of Independent Counsel, assigned to investigate the Iran-Contra affair. He followed that with a position as an associate at Onek, Klein & Farr, a now-defunct Washington firm. In 1989, he joined the U.S. Solicitor General's office and argued five Supreme Court cases on behalf of the government. In 1991, Sloan joined Chicago-based Mayer, Brown & Platt, as it was then called, as associate and then partner.

In 1993 he was tapped as Associate White House Counsel to President Bill Clinton. He headed the team assigned to steer the Supreme Court appointment of Justice Stephen G. Breyer through the Senate. He was an aide to general counsel Bernard Nussbaum, who was forced to resign over his actions regarding the Whitewater affair. Following the death in July 1993 of his colleague Vince Foster, Sloan reported to Nussbaum that he saw scraps of paper, which turned out to be a suicide note, in the bottom of Foster's briefcase, according to an attorney representing Foster's family who was present for the exchange. In an FBI interview in August 1993, Sloan said he never inspected the briefcase.

in 1995, he became a partner at the Washington firm Wiley, Rein & Fielding, where he co-chaired the Supreme Court and appellate practice group and the Internet practice group.

In 2000, he joined the Washington Post Co. as vice president of business affairs and general counsel at Washingtonpost.Newsweek Interactive and publisher of Slate, the company's online magazine. In March 2008, Sloan stepped down as publisher of Slate to become a partner at the law firm of Skadden, Arps, Slate, Meagher, and Flom LLP. In 2009, Sloan co-authored the book The Great Decision: Jefferson, Adams, Marshall, and the Battle for the Supreme Court with David McKean. The book is about the Marbury v. Madison case.

Following the 2008 election, Sloan made several appearances on Comedy Central’s The Colbert Report, including a two-part segment where Sloan "vetted" Stephen Colbert for a possible appointment to the Obama administration.

=== Special Envoy ===
On June 16, 2013, The New York Times, Fox News, National Public Radio, Reuters, and several other press sources reported that President Barack Obama would appoint Sloan as the new State Department envoy tasked to shut down the Guantanamo Bay detention camp by negotiating with countries which might accept the transfer of captives.

The previous Special Envoy, Daniel Fried, was granted seniority high enough he was addressed as Ambassador. When Fried was reassigned on January 28, 2013, no replacement was announced, and it was reported that the office was being shut down. Fried had not been able to initiate a new transfer for more than a year prior to his reassignment. However, in May 2013, Obama had re-iterated his commitment to closing the Guantanamo camps during a speech at the National Defense University. During his speech Obama had announced he would appoint a new senior official at the State Department, and another at the United States Department of Defense, tasked to expedite the transfer of the remaining Guantanamo captives.

On December 14, 2014, Secretary of State John Kerry announced Sloan's resignation. His resignation took observers by surprise as close to two dozen individuals had been released or repatriated shortly before his resignation.

In September 2020, he co-authored a piece that argued "there is simply no moral or legal justification for allowing Guantánamo to persist as a forgotten black hole suffocating 40 human beings."

=== Controversy ===
On February 5, 2019, The New York Times reported that Sloan, again serving as partner at the Skadden law firm, worked on the Paul Manafort-linked lobbying project for the Russia-aligned former president of Ukraine, Viktor Yanukovych. According to government filings, Manafort arranged for Skadden to receive $4 million from a Cypriot account that Manafort controlled, funneled through an oligarch. That oligarch was "understood" by the Skadden firm to be Victor Pinchuk. In an email cited in the law firm's $4.6 million settlement with the Justice Department over the issue, Sloan had written to another Skadden partner, Gregory Craig, that "the Ukraine payment situation" could "put us in a very deep hole in the western press…" and recommended that "we need to get it out there as soon as we can." Sloan testified at Craig's 2019 trial in Washington.

=== Later career ===
In 2019, Sloan retired from Skadden and became a law professor at the Georgetown University Law Center. Sloan is also the author of "The Court At War: FDR, His Justices, and the World They Made."

== Personal life ==
Sloan is married to Mary Lou Hartman, the former director of the Mitchell Scholarship program. They live in Chevy Chase, Maryland. They have two daughters, Sarah and Annie, and a son, Nick, and they are all Chicago Cubs fans. His daughter Sarah also served as a law clerk for Justice John Paul Stevens (following his retirement).

He suffered a heart attack in 2000.

== See also ==
- List of law clerks for the fourth seat of the Supreme Court of the United States
