= Paula A. DeSutter =

American government official

Paula DeSutter
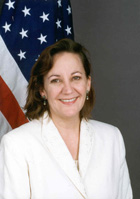

1st Assistant Secretary of State for Arms Control, Verification, and Compliance
- In office August 14, 2002 – January 16, 2009
- Preceded by: Position established
- Succeeded by: Rose Gottemoeller

Personal details
- Born: 1958 (age 67–68)
- Education: University of Nevada-Las Vegas (BA); University of Southern California (MA)

Paula Adamo DeSutter (born 1958) was United States Assistant Secretary of State for Verification, Compliance, and Implementation from 2002 to 2009.

DeSutter was educated at the University of Nevada, Las Vegas, receiving a B.A. in political science in 1979, and an M.A. in economics in 1983. She then attended the University of Southern California and received an M.A. in international relations.

While at USC, DeSutter was a graduate intern for the Arms Control and Disarmament Agency. (ACDA) She joined ACDA's Verification and Intelligence Bureau after graduate school. DeSutter was first a foreign affairs specialist, then chief of the Compliance and Implementation Division, and finally special assistant for verification and compliance to the assistant director for intelligence and verification.

Desutter was then chosen to represent the ACDA at the National War College, from which she received an M.S. in national security strategy. She then spent a year at the National Defense University as a senior visiting research fellow at its Center for Counter-Proliferation Research.

In the late 1990s, DeSutter joined the staff of the United States Senate Select Committee on Intelligence. There she was the staff liaison to Senator Jon Kyl and was responsible for legislation and oversight of intelligence collection, analysis and activities related to proliferation, terrorism, arms control, the Persian Gulf States, India, Pakistan, China, and Afghanistan.

In 2002, President of the United States George W. Bush appointed DeSutter as the first-ever assistant secretary of state for verification, compliance, and implementation. After Senate confirmation, she held this office from August 14, 2002, until January 16, 2009.

== 2015 nuclear agreement with Iran ==
DeSutter was the lead author of a September 2015 letter to President Obama signed by 56 arms control experts objecting to the July 2015 nuclear agreement with Iran (formally known as the Joint Comprehensive Plan of Action or JCPOA). Signers of the letter included U.S. Arms Control and Disarmament Agency (ACDA) former deputy director Stephen Read Hanmer, Jr., former ACDA assistant director Henry Cooper, former assistant director for verification and intelligence Manfred Eimer, former assistant director for nonproliferation Kathleen Bailey and former arms control policy advisor Brig. Gen. Larry Grundhauser. Another prominent signer, C. Paul Robinson, was president and director of Sandia National Laboratories, head of the nuclear weapons and national security programs at Los Alamos National Laboratory, and chief negotiator at the U.S./Soviet Union nuclear testing talks, and Henry Cooper, former chief defense and space talks negotiator and director of the Pentagon's Strategic Defense Initiative organization. Other signers included former CIA director James Woolsey, former national security advisor Robert McFarlane, former undersecretary of state for arms control and international security and ambassador to the UN John Bolton, and former deputy undersecretary of defense for intelligence, Lt. Gen. William "Jerry" Boykin, and former assistant secretary of energy for defense programs Troy Wade.

== Works ==
- Denial and Jeopardy: Deterring Iranian Use of NBC Weapons (National Defense University Press, 1998)

Government offices
Preceded by New Office	Assistant Secretary of State for Verification, Compliance, and Implementation; August 14, 2002 – January 16, 2009	Succeeded by Rose Gottemoeller
