= James C. O'Brien =

American attorney and diplomat

James O'Brien
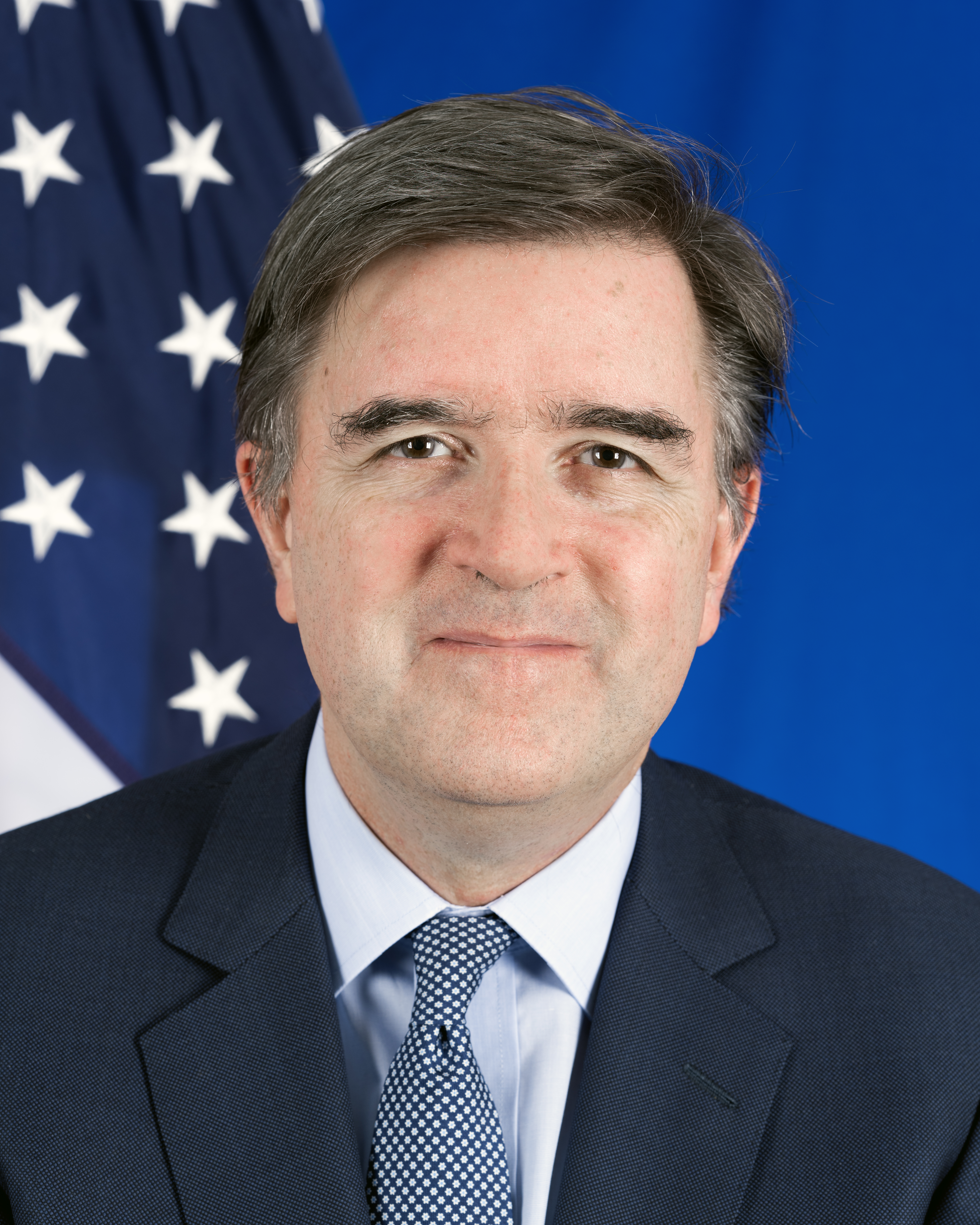

28th Assistant Secretary of State for European and Eurasian Affairs
- In office October 5, 2023 – January 20, 2025
- President: Joe Biden
- Preceded by: Karen Donfried
- Succeeded by: Brendan Hanrahan

Head of the Office of Sanctions Coordination
- In office April 14, 2022 – October 5, 2023
- President: Joe Biden
- Preceded by: Daniel Fried (2017)
- Succeeded by: Position Abolished

1st Special Envoy for Hostage Affairs
- In office August 28, 2015 – January 20, 2017
- President: Barack Obama
- Preceded by: Position established
- Succeeded by: Robert C. O'Brien

Personal details
- Education: Macalester College (BA); University of Pittsburgh (MA); Yale University (JD)

James C. O'Brien is an American attorney and diplomat who served as assistant secretary of state for European and Eurasian affairs in the Biden administration. He served as head of the Office of Sanctions Coordination from April 14, 2022 to October 5, 2023 and as the special envoy for hostage affairs from August 28, 2015 to January 20, 2017.

== Education ==
In 1978, O'Brien graduated from Creighton Preparatory School in Omaha, Nebraska. He earned a BA from Macalester College, an MA from the University of Pittsburgh, and a JD from Yale Law School.

== Diplomatic career ==
O'Brien joined the United States Department of State in 1989 as an attorney and diplomatic advisor. He later served as special presidential envoy for the Balkans, deputy director of the State Department's Office of Policy Planning, and as a senior adviser to the ambassador to the United Nations and secretary of state Madeleine Albright. O'Brien also had a role in managing the Dayton Agreement, a peace deal between Bosnia and Herzegovina, Croatia, and Serbia.

From August 28, 2015 to January 20, 2017, O'Brien served as the first special envoy for hostage affairs in the Obama administration. Since leaving his position, O'Brien has worked as a co-founder and principal at the Albright Stonebridge Group.

=== Biden Administration ===
==== Office of Sanctions Coordination ====
In October 2021, O'Brien was nominated to serve as Head of the Office of Sanctions Coordination in the Biden administration, a position with the rank of ambassador. Hearings on his nomination were held before the Senate Foreign Relations Committee on January 12, 2022. The committee favorably reported his nomination on March 8, 2022. On April 6, 2022, his nomination was confirmed in the United States Senate by a 71–26 vote. O'Brien was sworn in on April 14, 2022.

==== European & Eurasian Affairs Nomination ====
On May 19, 2023, President Joe Biden nominated O'Brien to be an assistant secretary of state for European and Eurasian affairs. On October 4, 2023 his nomination was confirmed in the Senate by a 67–31 vote.

==== The Steady State ====
O'Brien serves as the Chairman of the Board of Directors of The Steady State, an advocacy group active in U.S. politics made up of former senior national security officials, www.thesteadystate.org
