= Mallory Stewart =

American attorney

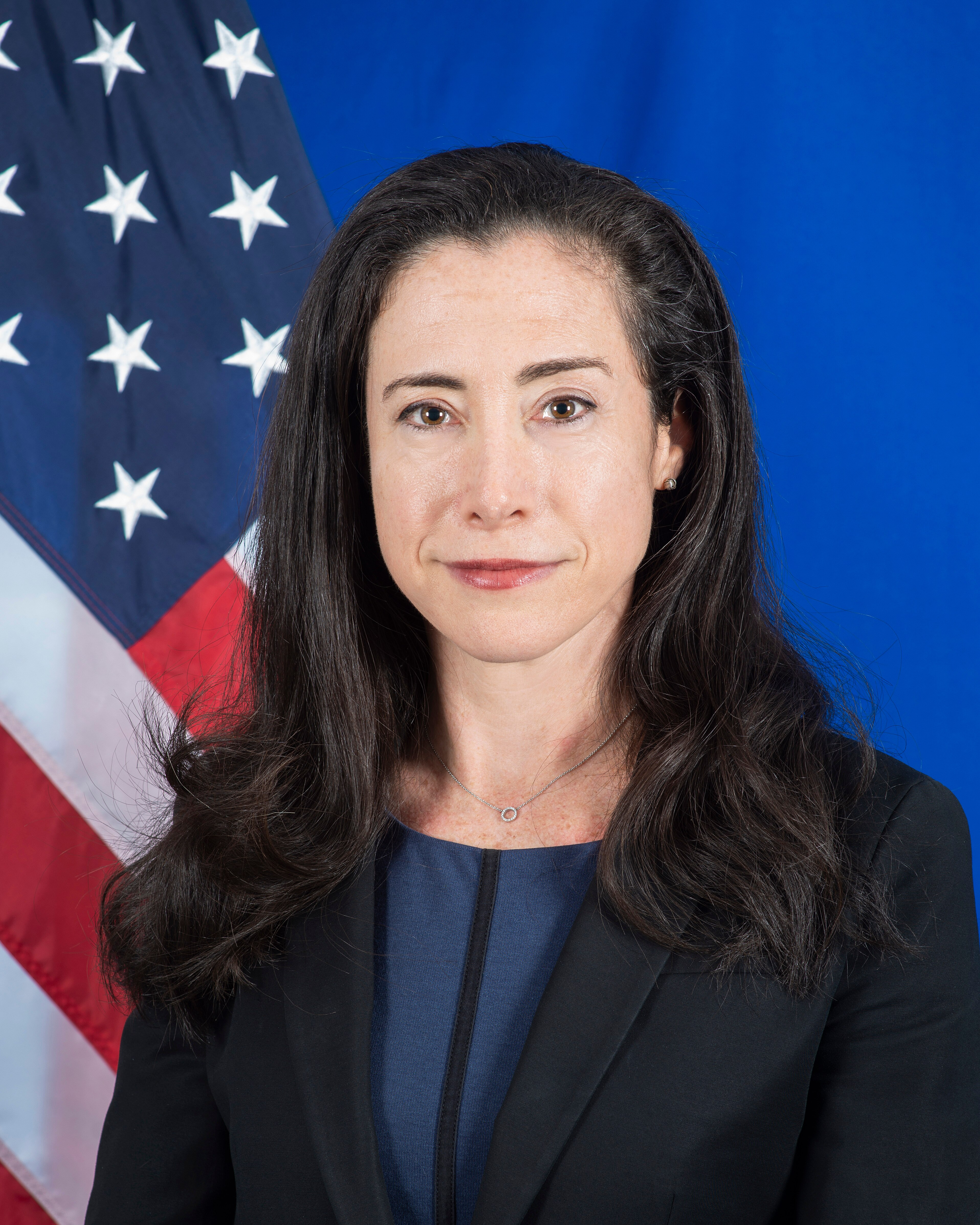

5th Assistant Secretary of State for Arms Control, Verification, and Compliance
- In office April 18, 2022 – January 20, 2025
- President: Joe Biden
- Preceded by: Yleem Poblete (2019)
- Succeeded by: Position abolished

Personal details
- Education: Harvard University (AB); Stanford University (JD)

Mallory A. Stewart is an American attorney who had served as the Assistant Secretary of State for Arms Control, Verification, and Compliance.

== Early life and education ==
Stewart obtained a Bachelor of Arts degree from Harvard College and a Juris Doctor from Stanford Law School.

== Career ==
Starting in 2002, Stewart served as an attorney in the Legal Advisor's Office and the principal deputy assistant secretary of state for emerging security challenges and defense policy. Stewart also worked as an attorney in the Iran-U.S. claims Tribunal in the office of claims and investment disputes.

Outside of government Stewart was an adjunct assistant professor for foreign service at Georgetown University, a non-resident fellow at the Stimson Center, and a manager at Sandia National Laboratories.

=== Biden administration ===
Stewart was appointed as a senior director of the United States National Security Council and special assistant to the president in the Biden administration on January 20, 2021, and served in this position until April 2022, when she assumed duties as assistant secretary of state.

==== State Department ====
Stewart was nominated for the assistant secretary post for arms control on July 2, 2021, by President Joe Biden. The Senate Foreign Relations Committee held hearings on Stewart's nomination on October 5, 2021. The nomination expired at the end of year, being returned to President Biden on January 3, 2022.

President Biden resent her nomination the following day. On March 8, 2022, the committee favorably reported her nomination to the Senate floor. Stewart's nomination was confirmed by the entire Senate via voice vote on March 29, 2022. She began service as assistant secretary on April 18, 2022.

== Personal life ==
Stewart lives in Washington, D.C., with her husband, Brian Boynton, and their three children.
