= Assistant Secretary of State for Arms Control, Verification, and Compliance =

Office in the United States Department of State

United States Assistant Secretary of State for Arms Control, Deterrence, and Stability
- Seal of the United States Department of State

- Flag of an assistant secretary of state
- Reports to: The under secretary for arms control and international security affairs
- Nominator: The president of the United States
- Inaugural holder: Paula A. DeSutter
- Formation: 2000
- Abolished: July 11, 2025
- Website: Official Website

The assistant secretary of state for arms control, deterrence, and stability is the head of the Bureau of Arms Control, Verification and Compliance. The position was created on December 12, 1999, by Secretary Madeleine Albright as the assistant secretary of state for verification and compliance. The Bureau became fully operational on February 1, 2000, and was first known as the Verification and Compliance Bureau. Within the department, the assistant secretary is responsible for all matters relating to the supervision of verification and compliance with international arms control, nonproliferation, and disarmament agreements. The bureau was given its current name during the Obama administration.

President Joe Biden nominated lawyer and arms control expert Mallory Stewart for the position on June 2, 2021; she was confirmed by the Senate on March 29, 2022, and was sworn in on April 18, 2022.

The assistant secretary manages and advises the secretary of state and the under secretary of state for arms control and international security on the appropriate uses of the Key Verification Assets Fund, which supports the Department of State's preservation of critical verification assets and promotes the development of new technologies to enhance verification of existing and future arms control, nonproliferation, and disarmament treaties or agreements.

The assistant secretary is also responsible for the President's Annual Report to Congress on Adherence to and Compliance with Arms Control Agreements, for verifiability assessments for all international arms control and nonproliferation agreements, and for specialized compliance reports required by U.S. Senate Resolutions of ratification, such as the condition 10(c) report on the Chemical Weapons Convention.

== Assistant secretaries of state for arms control, verification and compliance ==
#	Name	Assumed office	Left office	President(s) served under
1	Paula A. DeSutter	August 14, 2002	January 16, 2009	George W. Bush
2	Rose Gottemoeller	April 6, 2009	March 7, 2014	Barack Obama
3	Frank A. Rose	December 18, 2014	January 20, 2017	Barack Obama
4	Yleem D.S. Poblete	April 30, 2018	June 7, 2019	Donald Trump
-	Thomas G. DiNanno (Acting)	June 8, 2019	January 20, 2021	Donald Trump
-	Paul Dean (Acting)	March 13, 2022	April 18, 2022	Joe Biden
5	Mallory Stewart	April 18, 2022	January 20, 2025	Joe Biden
-	Paul Dean (Acting)	January 20, 2025	May 5, 2025	Donald Trump
-	Paul Watzlavick (Senior Bureau Official)	May 5, 2025	July 11, 2025	Donald Trump
