= Office of Sanctions Coordination =

Office of the United States Department of State

- Seal of the United States Department of State

Office overview
- Formed: 2021
- Dissolved: 2025
- Parent department: U.S. Department of State

The Office of Sanctions Coordination is a division within the United States Department of State tasked with coordinating sanctions policies among government departments and international allies. It was established by the 2021 Consolidated Appropriations Act. The office had previously existed from 2013 to 2017, after which it was dissolved by then-Secretary of State Rex Tillerson. The office is led by the Head of the Office of Sanctions Coordination, a position with the rank of ambassador.

== Officeholders ==
#	Name	Term began	Term ended	President(s) served under
1	Daniel Fried	2013	2017	Barack Obama
2	James C. O'Brien	2022	2023	Joe Biden
3	David H. Gamble Jr. (Acting)	2025	2025	Donald Trump
