= U.S. Advisory Commission on Public Diplomacy =

U.S. government agency

United States Advisory Commission on Public Diplomacy
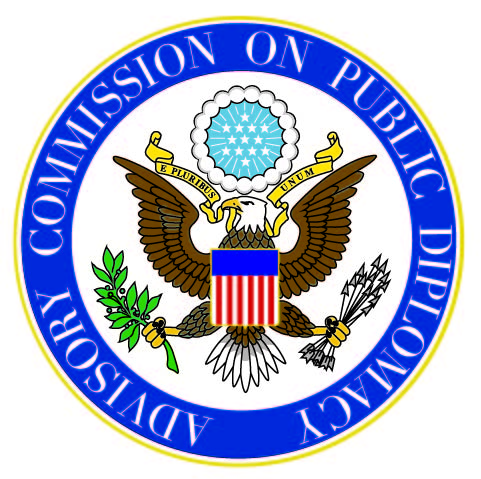

Commission overview
- Jurisdiction: U.S. Department of State
- Headquarters: Washington, D.C.
- Commission executive: Sarah Arkin, Executive Director
- Parent department: United States Department of State

The United States Advisory Commission on Public Diplomacy (ACPD), created in 1948, is tasked by Congress with "appraising U.S. Government activities intended to understand, inform, and influence foreign publics and to increase the understanding of, and support for, these same activities." The commission is supported by the Office of the Under Secretary of State for Public Diplomacy and Public Affairs, and reports to the president, secretary of state, and Congress. Its charter terminates two years after filing date unless renewed.

The commission conducts independent research and hosts symposia and panels to discuss public diplomacy while bringing together practitioners throughout the U.S. government and outside experts to provide honest assessments of and policy recommendations for improving U.S. public diplomacy. Priority areas of focus for the commission include: improving research and evaluation to bolster the impact of PD programs; integrating strategic planning with program design; strengthening public diplomacy professionals' development and training; and preparing public diplomats for the changing technological landscape of the 21st century.

== Members and leaders ==
The commission has seven commissioners who are appointed by the President of the United States, and confirmed by the Senate. It is a bipartisan body, and no more than four commissioners may belong to the same political party. Their terms last three years and are staggered so that some commissioners' terms ends on July 1 each year. Service may continue past term expiration until a successor is appointed and qualified. The president also designates one of the commissioners as chairman.

=== Current commissioners ===
The current commissioners as of December 22, 2024:

Position	Name	Party	Took office	Term expires
Chairman	Sim Farar	Democratic	May 26, 2011	July 1, 2018
Vice chairman	William Hybl	Republican	March 13, 2008	July 1, 2018
Member	Vacant			
Member	Vacant			
Member	Vacant			
Member	Vacant			
Member	Vacant			

The commission's executive director oversees general operations and works closely with U.S. government officials, NGOs, think tanks, businesses, academia, and other public diplomacy professionals to produce constructive ideas and recommendations for how the U.S. government engages in public diplomacy. The current executive director of ACPD is Sarah Arkin.

Previous executive directors include Vivian Walker, Shawn Powers, Katherine Brown, Matthew Armstrong, Carl Chan, Athena Katsoulos, Matthew Lauer, and Bruce Gregory.

== Reports ==
The commission publishes reports on a variety of public diplomacy topics, including research and evaluation, using data to measure program impact, digital diplomacy, cultural diplomacy, the diffusion of power, and professional training. The commission's main report is the "Comprehensive Annual Report on Public Diplomacy and International Broadcasting" which breaks down the U.S. government's expenditures for public diplomacy programs, while also including in-depth analysis of priority U.S. foreign policy issues including countering violent extremism, countering Russian malign influence in Europe and Central Asia, and research and evaluation of public diplomacy and international broadcasting. It also publishes special reports.

A 2017 special report, "Can Public Diplomacy Survive The Internet?", explores how public diplomacy is practiced in a post-truth society. Technological advances have transformed the spread of ideas, which both encourages active public participation in discourse, while also allowing for extremist ideologies to circulate online. This report explores the need for public diplomacy in this new digital age.
