= Senior Foreign Service =

Top 4 ranks of the US Foreign Service

The Senior Foreign Service (SFS) comprises the top four ranks of the United States Foreign Service. These ranks were created by the Foreign Service Act of 1980 and Executive Order 12293 in order to provide the Foreign Service with senior grades equivalent to general and flag ranks in the military and naval establishments, respectively, and to grades in the Senior Executive Service. Like military ranks and other Foreign Service ranks, the Senior Foreign Service grade system assigns rank in person, not rank in position.

== Grade structure ==
The four grades, from highest to lowest, with their military and former Senior Executive Service equivalents (i.e., prior to the SES's shift to an open-range compensation system), are:

SFS rank	Equivalent military rank	Former SES grade
Career ambassador (FE-CA)	Four-star rank (O-10)	ES-6
Career minister (FE-CM)	Three-star rank (O-9)	ES-6
Minister counselor (FE-MC)	Two-star rank (O-8)	ES-4, ES-5
Counselor (FE-OC)	One-star rank (O-7)	ES-1, ES-2, ES-3

Only one of these ranks, career ambassador, is established by law. The Foreign Service Act of 1980 stipulates that "the President may, by and with the advice and consent of the Senate, confer the personal rank of career ambassador upon a career member of the Senior Foreign Service in recognition of especially distinguished service over a sustained period." Otherwise, the act states that the president shall "prescribe salary classes for the Senior Foreign Service and shall prescribe an appropriate title for each class." President Ronald Reagan established the other three Senior Foreign Service ranks with Executive Order 12293.

=== Protocol ===
According to McCaffree's Protocol: The Complete Handbook of Diplomatic, Official & Social Usage, career ministers of the Senior Foreign Service are to be accorded the honorific "the honorable." Career ambassadors, as ambassadors, are accorded the honorific "Her/his excellency".

== Pay scale ==
2022 SFS Pay Range
Grade	Minimum	Maximum
Counselor (OC)	$135,468	$191,046
Minister counselor (MC)	$135,468	$200,411
Career minister (CM)	$135,468	$203,700

The Senior Foreign Service pay system is an open-range, performance-based pay system that is linked to the Senior Executive Service (SES) pay system. SFS members, like SES members, are not entitled to automatic across-the-board increases and locality-based comparability payments. Instead, pay adjustments are based on a member's individual performance and/or contribution to the agency's performance.

As amended under 5 U.S.C. 5376, Executive Order 12293 prescribes three SFS salary classes linked to the Executive Schedule, ranging from 120 percent of the pay rate for a GS-15, step 1 to the pay rate for ES-II:

Career minister (CM) with a pay cap equal to the rate of pay for ES-II (note: career ambassador SFS members are also paid within the CM rate range); minister-counselor (MC) with a pay cap equal to 1.07 times the rate of pay for ES-III; and counselor (OC) with a pay cap equal to 1.02 times the rate of pay for ES-III.

The executive order originally prescribed three SFS salary classes linked to the SES as follows:

Career minister (CM) with a range from 94 percent of the rate payable to level III of the Executive Schedule to 100 percent of the rate payable to level II of the Executive Schedule; minister-counselor (MC) with a range from 90 percent of the rate payable to level III of the Executive Schedule to 100 percent of the rate payable to level III of the Executive Schedule; and counselor (OC), with a range from 120 percent of the rate payable to GS–15, step 1 to 100 percent of the rate payable to level III of the Executive Schedule.

Prior to creation of the Senior Foreign Service (i.e., prior to implementation of the Foreign Service Act of 1980) career ministers were paid at the same rate as Class 1 Foreign Service officers. In 1979, an FSO-1 earned from $61,903 to $65,750 per annum, with the caveat that civil service and Foreign Service salaries were capped at $50,112.50 per annum, equal to the pay rate for Level V of the Executive Schedule, per Section 5308 of Title 5 of the U.S. Code. The top theoretical annual salary, $65,750, was equal to that of a GS-18.

== History ==
Prior to passage of the Foreign Service Act of 1980, the Rogers Act and subsequently the Foreign Service Act of 1946 had established a grade system from FSS-22 up to FSO-1. A single "senior" grade, career minister, was established by the 1946 Act for Foreign Service officers who had served with noteworthy distinction in ambassadorships or other, equivalent positions (usually as assistant secretary or under secretary of state). Since career ministers were paid at the same rate as senior FSO-1s, however, the "promotion" was merely symbolic.

The rank of career ambassador

"was first established by an Act of Congress on Aug 5, 1955, as an amendment to the Foreign Service Act of 1946. Under its provisions, the President with the advice and consent of the Senate was empowered to appoint individuals to the class who had (1) served at least 15 years in a position of responsibility in a government agency, including at least 3 years as a Career Minister; (2) rendered exceptionally distinguished service to the government; and (3) met other requirements prescribed by the Secretary of State."

Ambassadors were appointed as a rule from the ranks of FSO-2s and FSO-1s, with very senior ambassadorships going to the relatively rare career ministers and exceedingly rare career ambassadors. Following reform of the civil service in 1949, when the General Schedule with its three "supergrades" (GS-16 through GS-18) was created, and then following creation of the Senior Executive Service in 1978, however, Foreign Service officers in senior policy positions found themselves regularly equated to mid-level counterparts in the military and the civil service. The 1980 act sought in part to redress this imbalance in perceived status versus level of authority and responsibility.

== Functions ==
The intent of the Foreign Service Act of 1980 in establishing the Senior Foreign Service was to create a cadre of senior, policy-level foreign affairs professionals on a par with the senior, policy-level officers of the military and naval establishments, and with the civil service-based Senior Executive Service, which had been formed a few years prior. The 1980 Act describes the Senior Foreign Service as the "corps of leaders and experts for the management of the Service and the performance of its functions." The Act provides, moreover, that for promotion into and within the Senior Foreign Service, the precepts used by selection boards (the bodies responsible for recommending promotions and involuntary separations of underperformers) "shall emphasize performance which demonstrates the strong policy formulation capabilities, executive leadership qualities, and highly developed functional and area expertise" requisite for these positions.

In addition to their eligibility to serve in ambassadorships, SFS officers serve in senior positions in U.S. diplomatic missions (e.g., as deputy chief of mission, as head of section in a large embassy, or as consul general in a large consulate general) as well as in headquarters positions in their respective foreign affairs agencies.

== Eligibility and time in class ==
In order to be promoted into the Senior Foreign Service, an FS-1 Foreign Service officer or specialist must "open his/her window," that is, must formally request in writing consideration for promotion into the Senior Foreign Service. This application starts a clock; if the officer is not promoted into the Senior Foreign Service within a specific number of convocations of Selection Boards (set by regulation in each foreign affairs agency), the officer is mandatorily retired.

Like the rest of the Foreign Service, as well as their military counterparts, Senior Foreign Service officers are subject to time-in-class provisions. If not promoted within a specific "time in class" for the rank encumbered, the officer is mandatorily retired. The time in class for each grade varies both by grade and by foreign affairs agency, and is established by agency regulation. Times in class are now cumulative, so that early promotion to higher grades no longer leads to rapid retirement of rapidly rising officers.

These stipulations ensure flow-through of the senior ranks of the service, a specific goal of the rank-in-person Foreign Service personnel system.

== See also ==
- Diplomatic rank
- List of United States Foreign Service career ambassadors
