= Marcelle Wahba =

American diplomat

Marcelle Wahba is an American former diplomat who is the president emeritus and a distinguished fellow of the Arab Gulf States Institute in Washington (AGSIW).

Wahba was the founding president of AGSIW, serving from December 10, 2014, until May 24, 2019. She spent 22 years at the US State Department, retiring with the rank of Minister Counselor in May 2008. She was ambassador to the United Arab Emirates from October 4, 2001, to June 17, 2004.

Wahba graduated with a Bachelor of Arts in political science and a minor in international relations from Western College for Women in Oxford, Ohio and a Diploma in National Security from the National War College, National Defense University, Washington, DC in June 2006.
