= Lacina =

Lacina is both a masculine and female given name and a surname. Notable people with that name include:

== Given name ==
- Lacina Traoré (born 1990), Ivorian footballer

== Surname ==
- Corbin Lacina (born 1970), American football player and sports broadcaster
- Ferdinand Lacina (born 1942), Austrian politician
- Jan Lacina (born 1970), Czech politician
- Joe Lacina (born 1985), American artist, curator, and designer
- Patricia A. Lacina (born 1960), American diplomat
- Petr Lacina (born 1973), Czech judoka
- Sarah Lacina, American police officer
- Vladek Lacina (born 1949), Czech rower

== See also ==
- Lymire lacina, a moth of the subfamily Arctiinae
