= Newtown High School (Queens) =

Public school in New York City

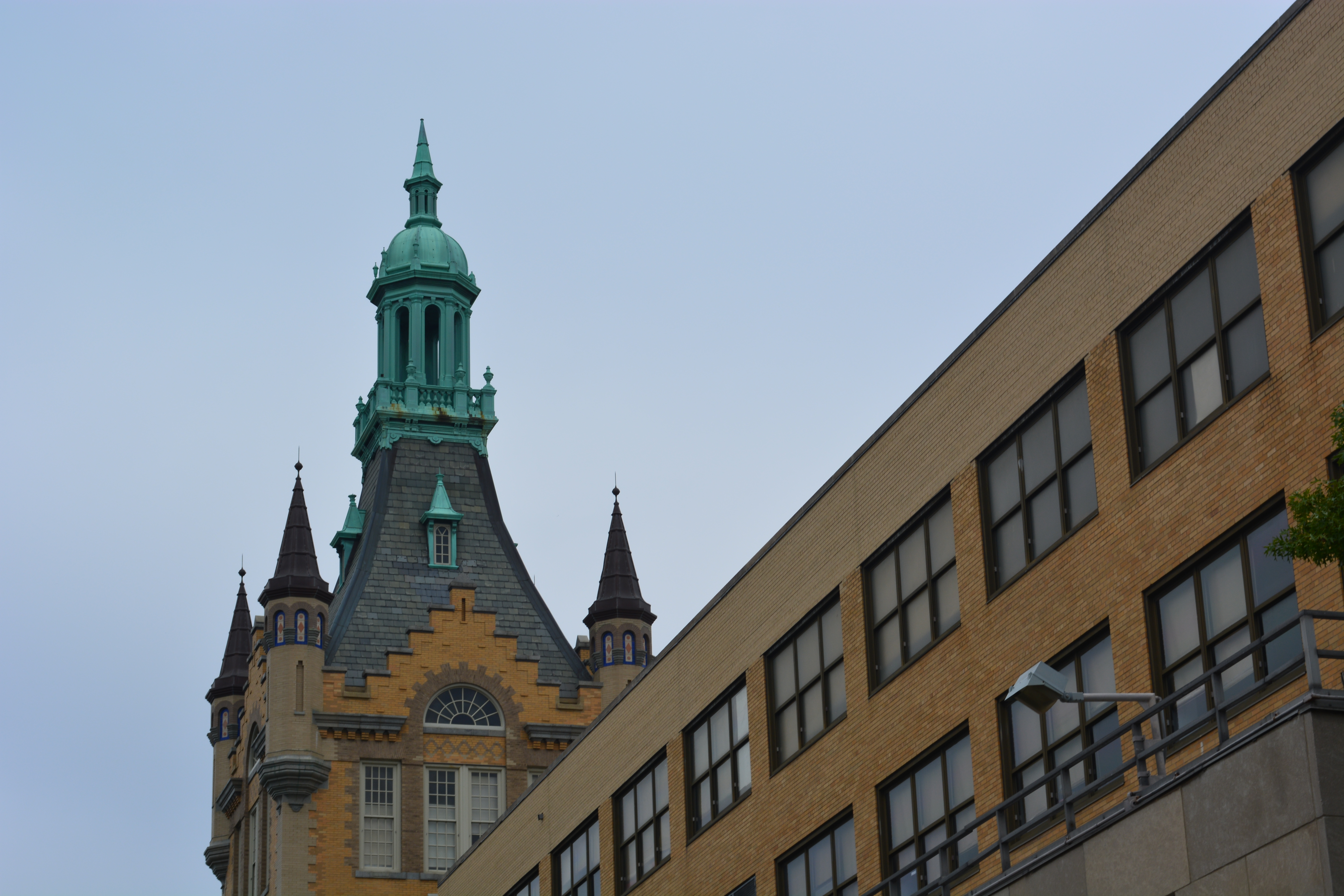
- Newtown High School in Queens

Location
- 48-01 90th St; Elmhurst, Queens, New York 11373; United States; 40.740829°N 73.874168°W

Information
- Type: Public
- Motto: We tower above the rest
- Established: 1897
- School district: New York City Department of Education
- NCES School ID: 360009802038
- Principal: Bill Psoras
- Teaching staff: 114.14 (on an FTE basis)
- Grades: 9-12
- Enrollment: 1,704 (2021-2022)
- Student to teacher ratio: 14.93
- Campus: City: Large
- Colors: Cardinal and Black
- Mascot: Pioneers
- Yearbook: Newtowner
- Website: www.newtownhighschool.org

Newtown High School is a high school in Elmhurst, a neighborhood in the New York City borough of Queens. It occupies an entire city block bound by 48th and 50th Avenues, and 90th and 91st Streets. Its student body consists of approximately 1,878 students.

The school offers college courses, advanced placement classes in English Language and Literature, Biology, Spanish Language and Literature, Chinese Language, Calculus BC, and Human Geography, among others; a business/technology program; a pre-engineering/technology preparation; and an art program. Newtown High School has teams in a variety of sports, both co-ed and broken down by gender. The sports offered include wrestling, soccer, baseball, cross-country, indoor track, outdoor track, softball, bowling, handball, volleyball, basketball, tennis, among others.

Newtown High School dates from 1897, having been constructed on the site of a small wooden schoolhouse built in 1866. The present building was designed by C. B. J. Snyder in a Flemish Renaissance Revival style between 1917 and 1921, with later additions in 1930–1931 and 1956–1958. The building is a New York City designated landmark.

== Building ==
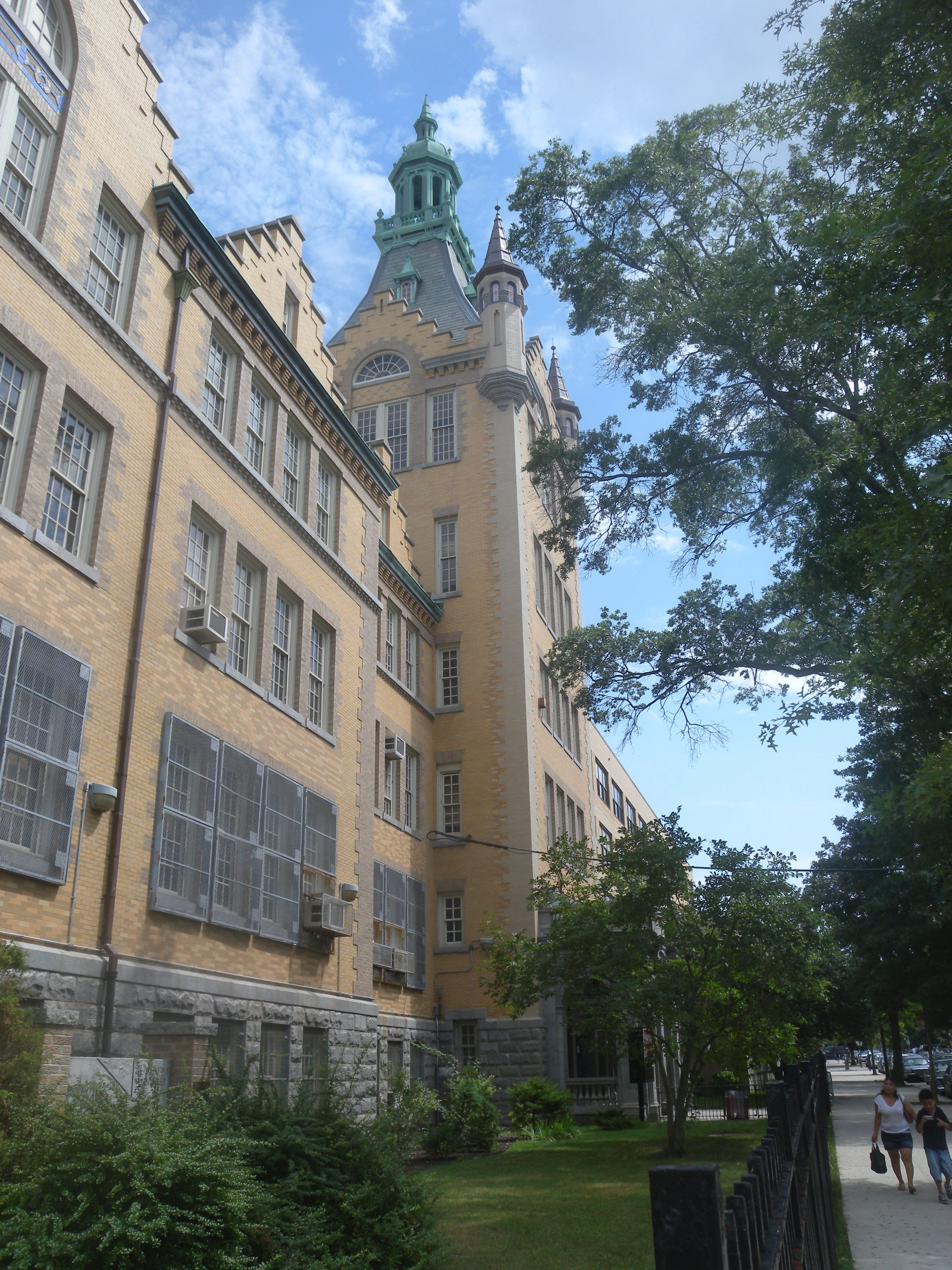
Front of school

Newtown High School is a large secondary school in the residential neighborhood of Elmhurst, in western Queens. Bound by 48th and 50th Avenues, and 90th and 91st Streets, the school occupies an entire city block. The current building is a result of several building campaigns spanning nearly four decades, three architects, and several architectural styles.

The site has had a school since 1866, when a small wooden school house was built to serve the children of Newtown and neighboring farms. The oldest extant portions of the school are from 1921, designed by C. B. J. Snyder in a Flemish Renaissance Revival style. Snyder's choice of this style showed his awareness of New York's and particularly Elmhurst's, beginnings as a Dutch colony. It is one of only a handful of public schools in New York City executed in this style. Snyder's design was built as an addition to the now demolished Boring and Tilton school completed in 1900. His design continued the stepped gables of the original building, and features a dramatic 169-foot, centrally placed tower topped by a cupola and turrets. The tower is visible throughout the neighborhood and gives the school its slogan: "We Tower Above the Rest." The Snyder addition comprises two wings, having granite imitating terra cotta bases, and clad with buff and beige brick, limestone, glazed terra cotta, and decorative ceramic tile, corbelled cornices, multi-soldier flat arch lintels, and sculptural relief on entrance porticoes.

As soon as 1930, another addition was built to accommodate the rapidly growing student population. Architect Walter C. Martin, designed two additional three-story wings, that are stylistically similar but less ornate than the previous Snyder wings. The Martin wings are Clad with buff and beige brick and limestone detailing; one features stepped gables with ceramic tile designs.

The most recent addition was completed in 1958 and designed by Maurice E. Salo and Associates. This wing took the place of the original school building by Boring and Tilton which had been deemed by the Board of Education to be deficient and not able to be improved by renovations. Instead of echoing the motifs of the previous additions, the four-story rectangular block addition was designed in the International Style. The steel-frame structure is clad with beige-colored bricks, limestone trim and aluminum panels.

Due to the site's long history, and the architectural significance of the building, the New York City Landmarks Preservation Commission designated Newtown High School a landmark in 2003. In 2012 the New York Landmarks Conservancy honored a comprehensive exterior restoration with its prestigious Lucy Moses Award to the team led by SUPERSTRUCTURES Engineers + Architect.

== Athletics ==
Newtown has seen some success with athletics, winning numerous city championships in a variety of athletic competitions. It currently competes in the Public Schools Athletic League (PSAL), and fields a wide number of teams in many different sports. They include:

Boys' teams

- Varsity and JV basketball
- Cross country
- Indoor/outdoor track
- Varsity soccer
- Varsity volleyball
- Golf
- Bowling
- Varsity and JV baseball
- Handball
- Wrestling American Football

Girls' teams

- Varsity and JV softball
- Basketball
- Indoor/outdoor track
- Bowling
- Soccer
- Cross country
- Gymnastics
- Varsity and JV volleyball
- Varsity Handball

== Extracurricular activities ==
- Robotics Club
- Coding Club
- Math Team
- Photography
- Key Club
- Bengali Cultural Club
- Medical Club

== Notable alumni ==
- Grace Lee Boggs, civil rights activist, social activist, author, philosopher and feminist
- William C. Brennan, lawyer, judge, and politician
- Joseph F. Donelan Jr., Assistant Secretary of State for Administration
- Peter T. Farrell, New York Supreme Court justice
- Richard Grasso, President of the New York Stock Exchange
- Frank Gulotta, New York Supreme Court justice
- Susan Gal, anthropologist, professor, author, and member of the American Academy of Arts and Sciences
- Crockett Johnson, cartoonist
- Don Kennedy, paralympic athlete, weightlifter and wheelchair basketball player
- Peter Lassally, television producer
- Estée Lauder, cosmetics manufacturer
- Ray Lumpp, NBA player
- Omar Minaya, former General Manager of the New York Mets
- Michael J. Murphy, New York City Police Commissioner
- Arthur Nascarella, actor
- Carroll O'Connor, actor
- Smush Parker, basketball player
- Reggie Pearman, Olympic middle-distance runner
- Frances Fox Piven, sociologist, professor, author, and activist
- Henry Pontell, criminologist, professor, scholar, writer
- Don Rickles, comedian
- Harry Riconda, professional baseball and basketball player
- Zoe Saldaña, actress, class of 1997
- John E. Sarno, physician and writer
- Michael Saunders, head trainer for The New York Knicks
- Lenny Schultz, comedian and gym teacher at Newtown High School
- John F. Scileppi, New York Supreme Court justice
- Shaan Shahid, Pakistani actor
- Gene Simmons, member of the rock group Kiss
- Rise Stevens, opera singer
- Harold R. Story, US Army major general
- Johnny Thunders, rock guitarist
- Sylvain Sylvain, rock guitarist
- Charlie Villanueva, professional basketball player
- Henry G. Walter Jr., former chairman and CEO of International Flavors and Fragrances
- Arki Dikania Wisnu, professional basketball player
