= John W. Dinkelman =

American diplomat (born 1961)

John Dinkelman
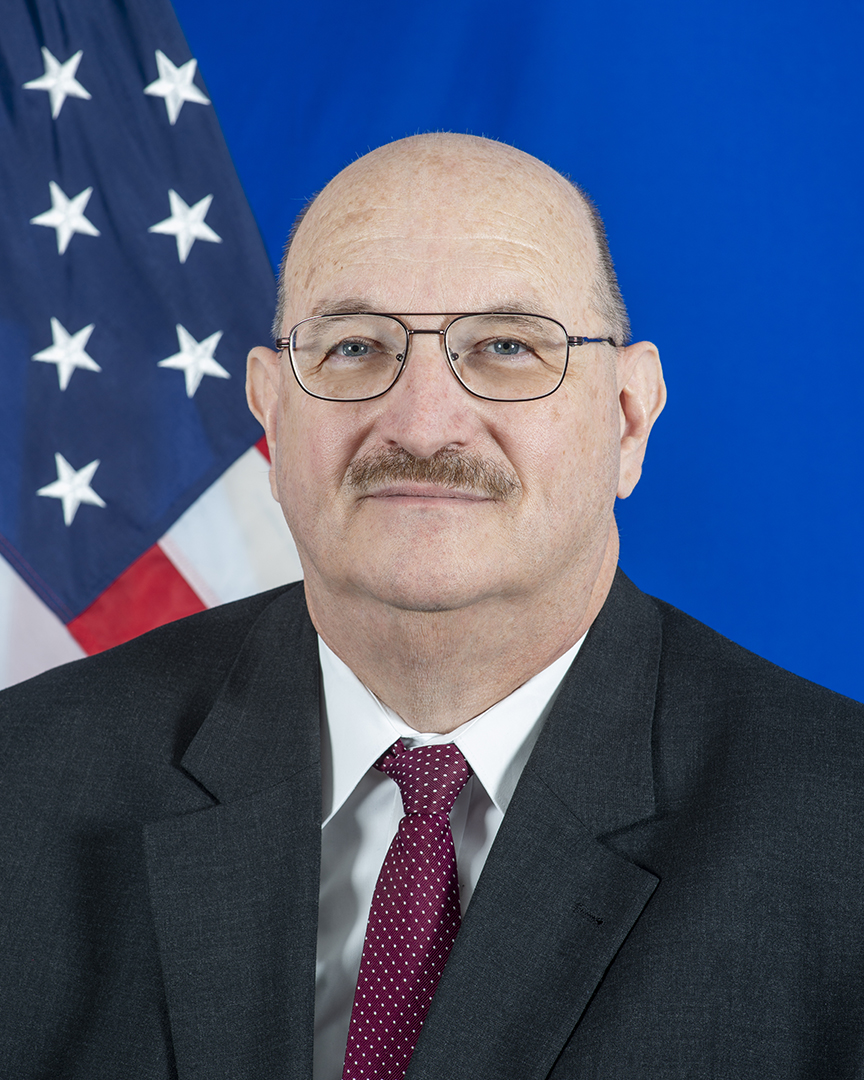
- Dinkelman in 2024

Assistant Secretary of State for Administration
- Acting; January 20, 2021 – December 6, 2021
- President: Joe Biden
- Preceded by: Carrie Cabelka
- Succeeded by: Alaina B. Teplitz
- Acting; March 12, 2019 – August 20, 2019
- President: Donald Trump
- Preceded by: Nicole Nason
- Succeeded by: Carrie Cabelka

United States Chargé d'affaires to The Bahamas
- In office November 21, 2011 – July 9, 2014
- President: Barack Obama
- Preceded by: Nicole Avant
- Succeeded by: Lisa A. Johnson (Charge d'affaries)

Personal details
- Spouse: Elizabeth Newman (m. 1993)
- Children: Three
- Parent(s): Alice Marie Dinkelman (DiDonato); John H. Dinkelman
- Education: Brigham Young University

John Walter Dinkelman (born 1961) is president of the American Foreign Service Association (AFSA). He was one of 264 members of the United States Foreign Service dismissed from employment in the largest single reduction in force ever conducted by the U.S. Department of State on July 11, 2025. Prior to his separation from the service, Dinkelman had served thirty-seven years as a Foreign Service officer.

== Early life and education ==
The son of a U.S. Army warrant officer, Dinkelman was raised in various locations while maintaining his family roots in Cottonwood Heights, Utah. After serving a mission for the Church of Jesus Christ of Latter-day Saints (LDS Church) to Argentina (1981–82), he earned a BA in business administration and Spanish from Brigham Young University in 1984.

== Career ==
After a short period in the private sector, Dinkelman entered the United States Foreign Service in August 1988. He was first stationed in Yugoslavia. Subsequent overseas assignments included the United Kingdom, the Marshall Islands, the Netherlands, Turkey, Mexico, and the Bahamas. Dinkelman's service as chargé d’affaires at the U.S. embassy in Nassau, the Bahamas was preceded by three years as principal officer (consul) at the U.S. consulate in Nogales, Sonora from 2007 to 2011. Dinkelman's domestic assignments included stints at the Foreign Service Institute, the Bureau of Western Hemisphere Affairs, the Bureau of Administration, and the Bureau of Global Talent Management, where he served as diplomat-in-residence at Howard University from 2023 until 2025.
