= Thomas Tracy =

Thomas Tracy may refer to:

- Thomas Tracy (MP died 1621) (1567–1621), MP for Wilton
- Thomas Tracy (Connecticut politician) (1610-1685), migrant from England to the United States
- Thomas Tracy (MP died 1770) (c. 1716–1770), MP for Gloucestershire
- Thomas F. Tracy (1861–1916), American labor unionist
- Thomas Henry Tracy (1848–1925), Canadian architect
- Tom Tracy (1934–1996), American footballer
- Thomas M. Tracy (born 1936) was United States Assistant Secretary of State for Administration
- Thomas F. Tracy (philopshoper) (born 1948), American Christian philosopher

== See also ==
- Thomas Hanbury-Tracy, 2nd Baron Sudeley, British colliery owner and politician
- Tracie Thomas, musician
