= Dinkelman =

Dinkelman is a surname. Notable people with the surname include:

- Brian Dinkelman (born 1983), American baseball player and manager
- John W. Dinkelman (born 1961), American diplomat
