= Edward T. Wailes =

American diplomat (1903–1969)

United States Ambassador to Czechoslovakia
- In office July 28, 1961 – October 22, 1962
- Preceded by: Christian M. Ravndal
- Succeeded by: Outerbridge Horsey

United States Ambassador to Iran
- In office July 19, 1958 – June 9, 1961
- Preceded by: Selden Chapin
- Succeeded by: Julius C. Holmes

United States Ambassador to Hungary
- In office July 26, 1956 – February 27, 1957
- Preceded by: Christian M. Ravndal
- Succeeded by: Garret G. Ackerson Jr. (interim)

United States Ambassador to South Africa
- In office November 29, 1954 – August 11, 1956
- Preceded by: Waldemar J. Gallman
- Succeeded by: Henry A. Byroade

Assistant Secretary of State for Administration
- In office May 29, 1953 – June 22, 1954
- President: Dwight D. Eisenhower
- Preceded by: Carlisle H. Humelsine
- Succeeded by: Isaac W. Carpenter Jr.

Personal details
- Born: Edward Thompson Wailes; February 16, 1903 Brooklyn, New York, U.S.
- Died: June 25, 1969 (aged 66) New York City, U.S.
- Resting place: Rock Creek Cemetery
- Spouse: Cornelia Lyon Wailes (m. 1933)
- Education: Princeton University (BA); Columbia University (LLB)

Edward Thompson Wailes (February 16, 1903 – June 25, 1969) was an American diplomat and lawyer who served as an ambassador to Czechoslovakia, South Africa, Iran, and Hungary. He also served as the sixth Assistant Secretary of State for Administration.

== Early life ==
Edward Thompson Wailes was born in Brooklyn, New York, on February 16, 1903. He earned a Bachelor of Arts degree from Princeton University in 1925 and a Bachelor of Laws from Columbia Law School in 1927.

== Career ==
After graduating from law school, Wailes joined the United States Foreign Service. As a Foreign Service Officer, he alternated between field appointments and desk jobs at the United States Department of State in Washington, D.C. Overseas, he was posted in Nanking 1930-33; in Brussels 1936-39; in Ottawa 1942; and in London 1943-45.

In 1945, he served as Special Assistant to the Director of the State Department's Office of European Affairs, and then as chief of the Division of British Commonwealth Affairs 1945-48. He became a Foreign Service Inspector in 1948, and Chief Inspector of the Foreign Service Inspection Corps in 1951.

In 1953, President of the United States Harry Truman nominated Wailes as Assistant Secretary of State for Administration and, after Senate confirmation, he held this post from May 29, 1953 until June 22, 1954.

President Dwight Eisenhower named Wailes United States Ambassador to South Africa on September 15, 1954, with Ambassador Wailes presenting his credentials on November 29, 1954 and holding that post until August 11, 1956.

Eisenhower then named Wailes United States Ambassador to Hungary, with Ambassador Wailes receiving his commission on July 26, 1956. At the time of this appointment, the People's Republic of Hungary was ruled by the Hungarian Communist Party, under Prime Minister of Hungary András Hegedüs. The Hungarian Revolution of 1956 began on October 23, 1956, with crowds demanding the return of former prime minister Imre Nagy, who had pledged to lead Hungary out of the Warsaw Pact and promised democratic reforms. The next day, Nagy took over as prime minister. On the advice of Soviet Ambassador to Hungary Yuri Andropov, Hegedüs fled to the Soviet Union and signed papers asking for Soviet intervention in Hungary to stop Nagy. Wailes arrived in Hungary on November 2, 1956. Soviet tanks entered Budapest on November 4, Nagy fled, and the pro-Soviet János Kádár became Prime Minister of Hungary. The Hungarian Revolution ended on November 10, with the Soviets having succeeded in blocking any movement towards democratic reforms in Hungary. Wailes refused to present his credentials to the new government, stating that the government "did not represent the people." Shortly thereafter he was "recalled for consultations" and left Hungary on February 27, 1957.

Wailes spent 1957-58 as Deputy Commandant of the National War College. President Eisenhower then named him United States Ambassador to Iran and he served in that post 1958 to 1961. President John F. Kennedy then nominated him as United States Ambassador to Czechoslovakia, with Wailes presenting his credentials on July 28, 1961 and serving as ambassador until October 22, 1962.

== Personal life ==
Wailes married Cornelia Lyon Wailes, daughter of Emily Dill (née Lyon) and Henry Stephenson Wailes, of Salisbury, Maryland, on December 30, 1933. Following his retirement, they lived in Washington, D.C.

Wailes had a heart attack and died on June 25, 1969, in New York City. He was buried in Rock Creek Cemetery.

== Legacy ==
Following the death of his wife, The Cornelia and Edward Thompson Wailes College Center was named in their honor at Sweet Briar College.

Government offices
| Preceded by Carlisle H. Humelsine | Assistant Secretary of State for Administration; May 29, 1953 – June 22, 1954 | Succeeded by Isaac W. Carpenter Jr. |
Diplomatic posts
| Preceded by WaldeMarch J. Gallman | United States Ambassador to South Africa; November 29, 1954 – August 11, 1956 | Succeeded by Henry A. Byroade |
| Preceded by Christian M. Ravndal | United States Ambassador to Hungary; July 26, 1956 – February 27, 1957 | Succeeded by Garret G. Ackerson Jr. |
| Preceded by Selden Chapin | United States Ambassador to Iran; 1958 – 1961 | Succeeded by Julius C. Holmes |
| Preceded by Christian M. Ravndal | United States Ambassador to Czechoslovakia; July 28, 1961 – October 22, 1962 | Succeeded by Outerbridge Horsey |
