= Dwight J. Porter =

American diplomat

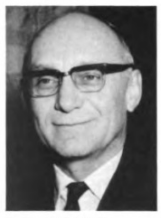

US Ambassador to Lebanon
- In office June 22, 1965 – September 12, 1970
- President: Lyndon B. Johnson
- Preceded by: Armin H. Meyer
- Succeeded by: William B. Buffum

Personal details
- Born: April 12, 1916
- Died: June 4, 2006 (aged 90)

Dwight Johnson Porter (April 12, 1916 – June 4, 2006) was a United States diplomat. He served as United States Ambassador to Lebanon from 1965 to 1970.

== Biography ==
Dwight J. Porter was born in Shawnee, Oklahoma on April 12, 1916, the son of Dwight and Gertrude Johnson Porter. During World War II, he served in the United States Marine Corps 1942–45. He married Adele Ritchie on October 6, 1942 (shortly before his deployment with the Marines) in Omaha, Nebraska, and together the couple had three sons and three daughters.

After the war, Porter worked for the Displaced Persons Commission from 1945 to 1949. He was then a Foreign Service Officer posted in Frankfurt am Main 1949–54, then in London 1954–56. He spent 1956-59 in Washington, D.C., at the State Department's Economics Bureau, then returned to the field, spending 1959–63 in Vienna.

In 1963, President of the United States John F. Kennedy named Porter Assistant Secretary of State for Administration and, after Senate confirmation, Porter held this position from October 2, 1963 until March 28, 1965.

In 1965, President Lyndon B. Johnson named Porter United States Ambassador to Lebanon, and he held this post from June 22, 1965 until September 12, 1970. He was thus Ambassador to Lebanon during the Six-Day War, and later commented publicly about the USS Liberty incident. After the attack, he recounted a conversation between an Israeli pilot and the Israel Defense Forces (IDF) war room, which he said picked up by a National Security Agency listening post at the U.S. embassy in Beirut. Israeli pilot to IDF war room: “This is an American ship. Do you still want us to attack?” IDF war room to Israeli pilot: “Yes, follow orders.” Israeli pilot to IDF war room: “But sir, it’s an American ship – I can see the flag!” IDF war room to Israeli pilot: “Nevermind; hit it.” William Chandler, the former head of the Trans-Arabian Pipeline Company and a close friend of Porter, said Porter recalled this pilot protesting to ground control. Porter also discussed the transcripts with former U.S. Ambassador to Qatar Andrew Killgore. According to Killgore, Porter said that he “saw the telex, read it, and passed it right back” to the embassy official who had shown it to him and quoted him as recalling that the transcript showed “Israel was attacking, and they know it’s an American ship.”

Although this claim is frequently cited in discussions of the USS Liberty incident, no official documents or transcripts have been produced to verify it. In an interview with A. Jay Cristol, Dwight Porter did not explicitly retract the allegation but acknowledged the absence of supporting evidence.

In the early 1970s, Porter was the U.S.'s Resident Representative to the International Atomic Energy Agency.

After leaving government service, Porter worked as an executive at the Westinghouse Electric Company.

In retirement, Porter split his time between Lake Forest, Illinois and Rancho Mirage, California. He died in Rancho Mirage of complications from a stroke on June 4, 2006, aged 90.

Government offices
Preceded by William J. Crockett	Assistant Secretary of State for Administration; October 2, 1963 – March 28, 1965	Succeeded by Francis G. Meyer
Diplomatic posts
Preceded by Armin H. Meyer	United States Ambassador to Lebanon; June 22, 1965 – September 12, 1970	Succeeded by William B. Buffum
