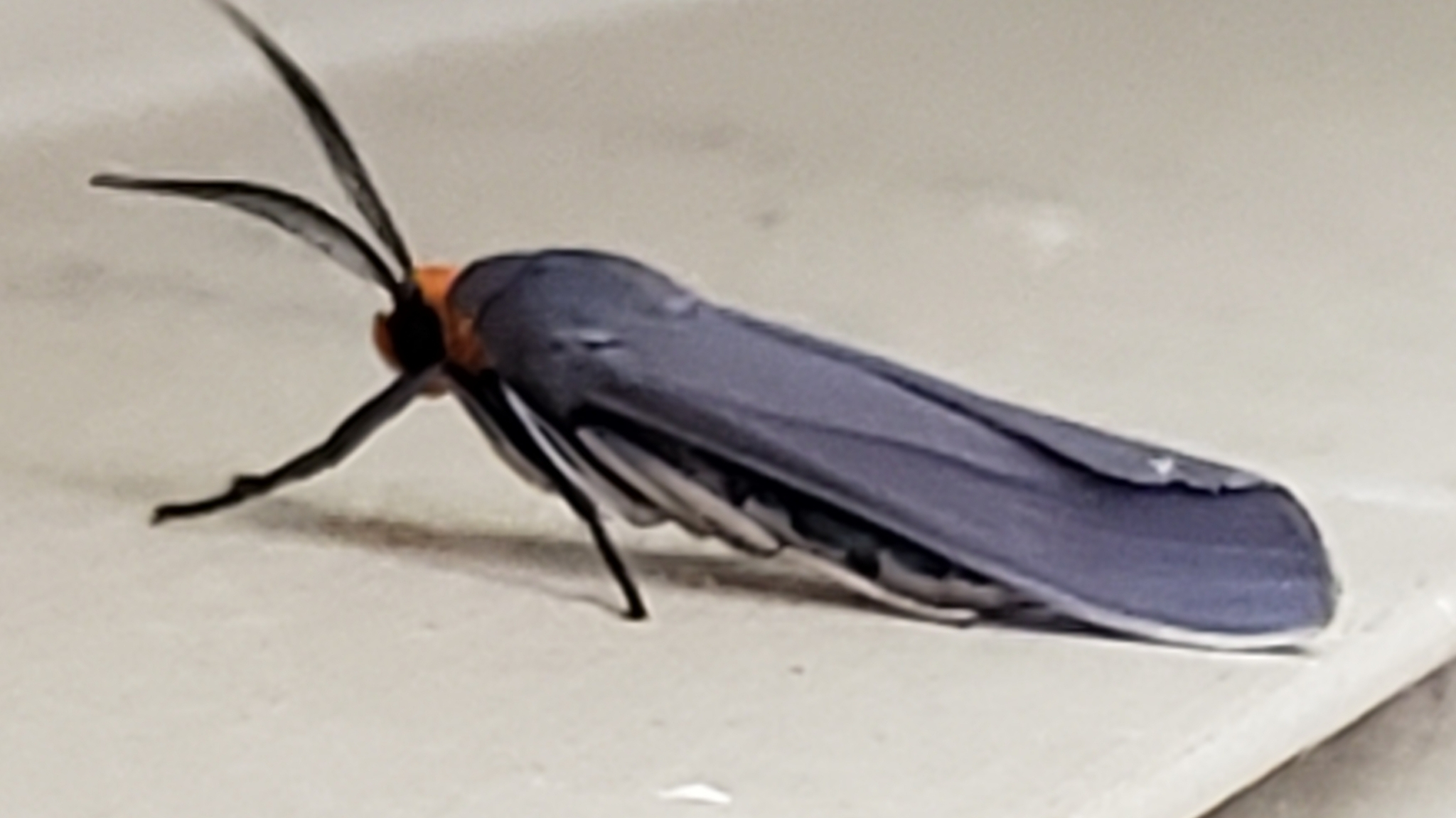

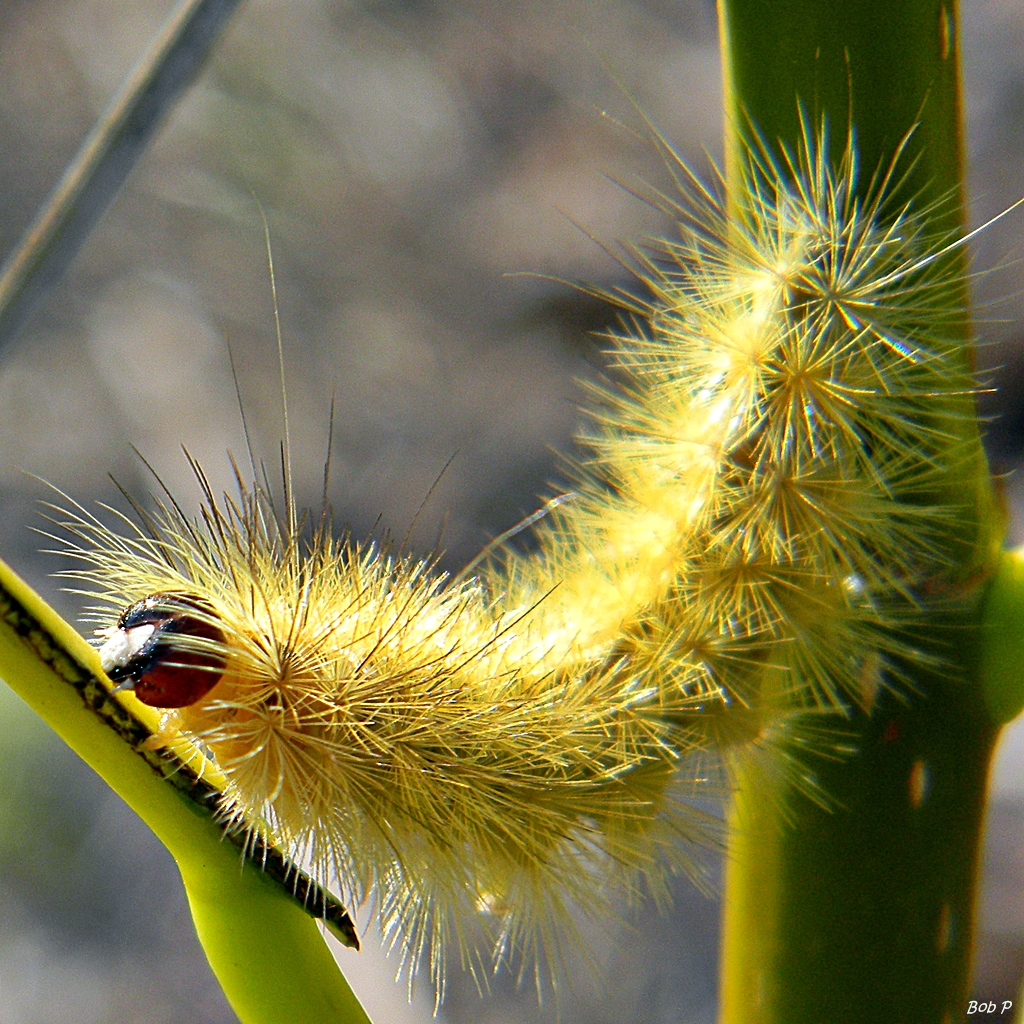
- Adult (top) and larva (bottom)

Scientific classification
- Kingdom: Animalia
- Phylum: Arthropoda
- Class: Insecta
- Order: Lepidoptera
- Superfamily: Noctuoidea
- Family: Erebidae
- Subfamily: Arctiinae
- Genus: Lymire
- Species: L. edwardsii

Binomial name
- Lymire edwardsii (Grote, 1881)

Synonyms
- Scepsis edwardsii Grote, 1881

= Lymire edwardsii =

Species of moth

Lymire edwardsii, the rubber tree caterpillar or Edwards' wasp moth, is a species of moth in the subfamily Arctiinae. It was described by Augustus Radcliffe Grote in 1881. It is found in southern Florida, United States, and in the Caribbean.

== Description ==
The wingspan is 35–40 mm. The wings are bluish gray. Adults are on wing year round.

== Behaviour and ecology ==
The larvae feed on Ficus species, including Ficus pedunculata, Ficus altissima, Ficus aurea, Ficus auriculata, Ficus benghalensis, Ficus benjamina, Ficus continifolia, Ficus elastica, Ficus lyrata, Ficus retusa and Ficus rubiginosa. They feed on leaf margins or create holes in the leaves. Full-grown larvae are pale yellow with four white stripes and a reddish/orange and white head. Pupation takes place on various (non-host) plants.
