= Robert E. Lamb =

American diplomat

Robert E. Lamb (born November 17, 1936) was Assistant Secretary of State for Administration within the U.S. State Department from 1983 to 1985. He also served as an Assistant Secretary of State for Diplomatic Security from 1987 to 1989 and the United States Ambassador to Cyprus from 1990 to 1993.

== Biography ==
Robert E. Lamb was born in Atlanta, Georgia, on November 17, 1936. He was educated at the University of Pennsylvania, receiving a Bachelor of Arts in 1962.

After college, Lamb joined the United States Foreign Service beginning a career as a Foreign Service Officer. A career diplomat, he rose through the ranks of the United States Department of State to become director of the United States Passport Office in the Bureau of Consular Affairs and director of Financial Services.

In 1983, President Ronald Reagan nominated Lamb as Assistant Secretary of State for Administration, and Lamb held this office from December 19, 1983, until July 1, 1985. He then became director of the Bureau of Diplomatic Security. In 1987, the head of the Bureau of Diplomatic Security was elevated to the rank of Assistant Secretary and President Reagan named Lamb as the first Assistant Secretary of State for Diplomatic Security. Lamb held this office from June 19, 1987, until August 9, 1989.

President George H. W. Bush then nominated Lamb as United States Ambassador to Cyprus, with Lamb presenting his credentials on November 30, 1990, and serving as Ambassador to Cyprus until October 24, 1993.

Lamb retired from the Foreign Service in 1994. He then became Executive Director of the American Philatelic Society in State College, Pennsylvania. He retired from that position in 2006. Under his administration, the Society moved its headquarters to an historic, former Match Factory in Bellefonte, Pennsylvania. Upon his retirement, the Society named the Executive wing of the headquarters complex in his honor.

Government offices
Preceded by Thomas M. Tracy	Assistant Secretary of State for Administration; December 19, 1983 – July 1, 1985	Succeeded by Donald J. Bouchard
Preceded by New Office	Assistant Secretary of State for Diplomatic Security; June 19, 1987 – August 9, 1989	Succeeded by Sheldon J. Krys
Diplomatic posts
Preceded by Bill K. Perrin	United States Ambassador to Cyprus; November 30, 1990 – October 24, 1993	Succeeded by Richard Boucher
