= Atul Keshap =

American diplomat (born 1971)

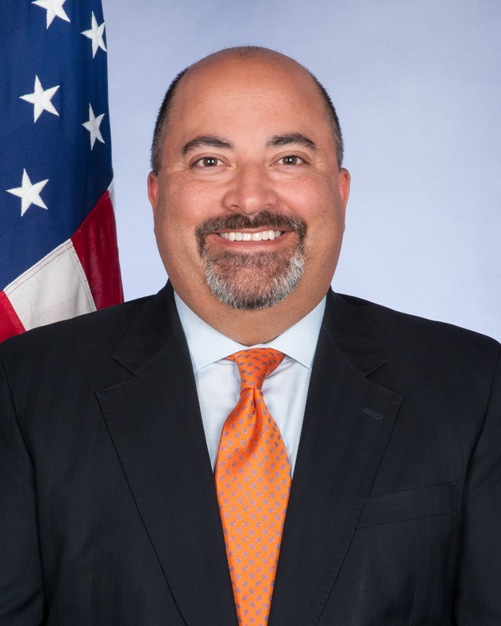

U.S. Chargé D'Affaires to India
- In office June 29, 2021 – September 9, 2021
- President: Joe Biden
- Preceded by: Daniel Bennett Smith
- Succeeded by: Patricia A. Lacina

United States Ambassador to Sri Lanka and the Maldives
- In office August 21, 2015 – July 15, 2018
- President: Barack Obama; Donald Trump
- Preceded by: Andrew Mann (Acting)
- Succeeded by: Alaina B. Teplitz

Personal details
- Born: June 1971 (age 55) Nigeria
- Education: University of Virginia

Atul Keshap is a retired American diplomat and career United States Foreign Service Officer from Virginia who serves at the U.S. Chamber of Commerce as the President of the U.S.- India Business Council since January 2022. He also serves as Senior Vice President for South Asia and as President of the U.S.-Bangladesh Business Council. Previously, he served as the Chargé d'affaires of the United States mission to India in 2021. He formerly served as U.S. Ambassador to Sri Lanka and the Maldives and Principal Deputy Assistant Secretary of State of the Bureau of East Asian and Pacific Affairs at the United States Department of State. In 2022, Ambassador Keshap was elected into membership of the American Academy of Diplomacy. In May 2023, Keshap was named one of Washington's most influential foreign policy influencers for his work to shape U.S. relations with India.

== Career ==
Ambassador Keshap served from summer 2018 to summer 2019 as vice chancellor of the College of International Security Affairs at the National Defense University, Fort McNair, Washington, DC.

On March 26, 2015, President Barack Obama nominated Keshap to serve as Ambassador Extraordinary and Plenipotentiary of the United States of America to the Democratic Socialist Republic of Sri Lanka and concurrently to the Republic of Maldives. The United States Senate confirmed Keshap in that position on August 21, 2015.

His father, Keshap Chander Sen, PhD, who was from Punjab, India was a U.N. development economist working in Nigeria where Mr. Keshap was born in June, 1971. His mother, Zoe Calvert, had been in the U.S. Foreign Service when she met and married Dr. Sen in London. She had also served at the U.S. embassy in India.

Keshap served from 2013 to 2015 as Deputy Assistant Secretary of State for South Asia, working closely with Assistant Secretary of State Nisha Desai Biswal to coordinate U.S. Government policy toward India, Bangladesh, Sri Lanka, Nepal, Maldives, and Bhutan. This diverse and strategic region contains almost 1.5 billion people and produces over $2 trillion in economic output.

From 2012–2013, Keshap served as the United States Senior Official for Asia Pacific Economic Cooperation (APEC), a trade body whose members generate 55 percent of global GDP. Keshap was responsible for U.S. policy initiatives during the Russia and Indonesia host years and served concurrently as Assistant Secretary of State Kurt Campbell’s Coordinator for Economic Policy in the Bureau of East Asian and Pacific Affairs.

From 2010 to 2012, Keshap worked with Assistant Secretary of State Robert O. Blake as Director of the Office of India, Nepal, Sri Lanka, Bangladesh, Maldives, and Bhutan Affairs in the State Department’s Bureau of South and Central Asian Affairs, managing U.S. foreign policy toward a strategically important region that comprises a fifth of the world's population.

From 2008 to 2010, Keshap was Director of the Office of Human Rights, Humanitarian, and Social Affairs in the Bureau of International Organizations of the State Department, where he helped lead U.S. efforts to frame multilateral human rights policy with regard to the United Nations system, including instructions to U.S. delegations to the Human Rights Council and the United Nations General Assembly.

Keshap was posted as Deputy Minister Counselor for Political Affairs at the United States Embassy in New Delhi from 2005 to 2008, where he served as one of Ambassador David Mulford’s principal advisors on the U.S.-India civilian nuclear energy cooperation initiative. He also worked to implement the broader strategic partnership with India at all levels in close coordination with the Indian government while managing a large political reporting and outreach team.

From 2003-2004, Keshap served as director for North African and Middle Eastern Regional Affairs on the National Security Council staff in the Executive Office of the President. While there, he was responsible for recommendations to President Bush and National Security Advisor Condoleezza Rice on policy formulation for five countries in North Africa. He also helped implement the landmark breakthrough in relations with Libya, and helped complete negotiations on the Morocco–United States Free Trade Agreement.

As special assistant for the Middle East, North Africa, and South Asia from 2002-2003 for the Under Secretary of State for Political Affairs, he managed Ambassador Marc Grossman’s engagement with 25 countries in the Middle East, North Africa, Arabian Peninsula, and South Asia. As Country Desk Officer for the United Arab Emirates and Qatar from 2000-2002, he contributed to efforts to secure much-needed basing rights following September 11.

Keshap has also served as an operations officer on the executive staff of Secretary of State Madeleine Albright, and as a political/economic officer at U.S. Embassies in Rabat, Morocco and Conakry, Guinea.

In October 2018, he was named the vice–chancellor of the National Defense University.

He is the recipient of a certificate of recognition from Secretary of State Colin Powell for duties performed in the State Department Operations Center on September 11, 2001 and afterwards. In July 2018, Keshap received the Distinguished Honor Award from Secretary of State Mike Pompeo.

=== US Chargé d'affaires to India ===
He served as the Chargé d'affaires of the United States mission to India. He was criticized by Human Rights group and US congressmen for meeting the chief of the Rashtriya Swayamsevak Sangh, an Indian right wing organisation with Hindu nationalist ideology. US Congressman David Trone (Democrat-Maryland) said, "By engaging with RSS officials and discussing their ideology, the United States could lend legitimacy to this controversial group and further jeopardize the communities that the RSS has targeted."

=== President of U.S.-India Business Council ===
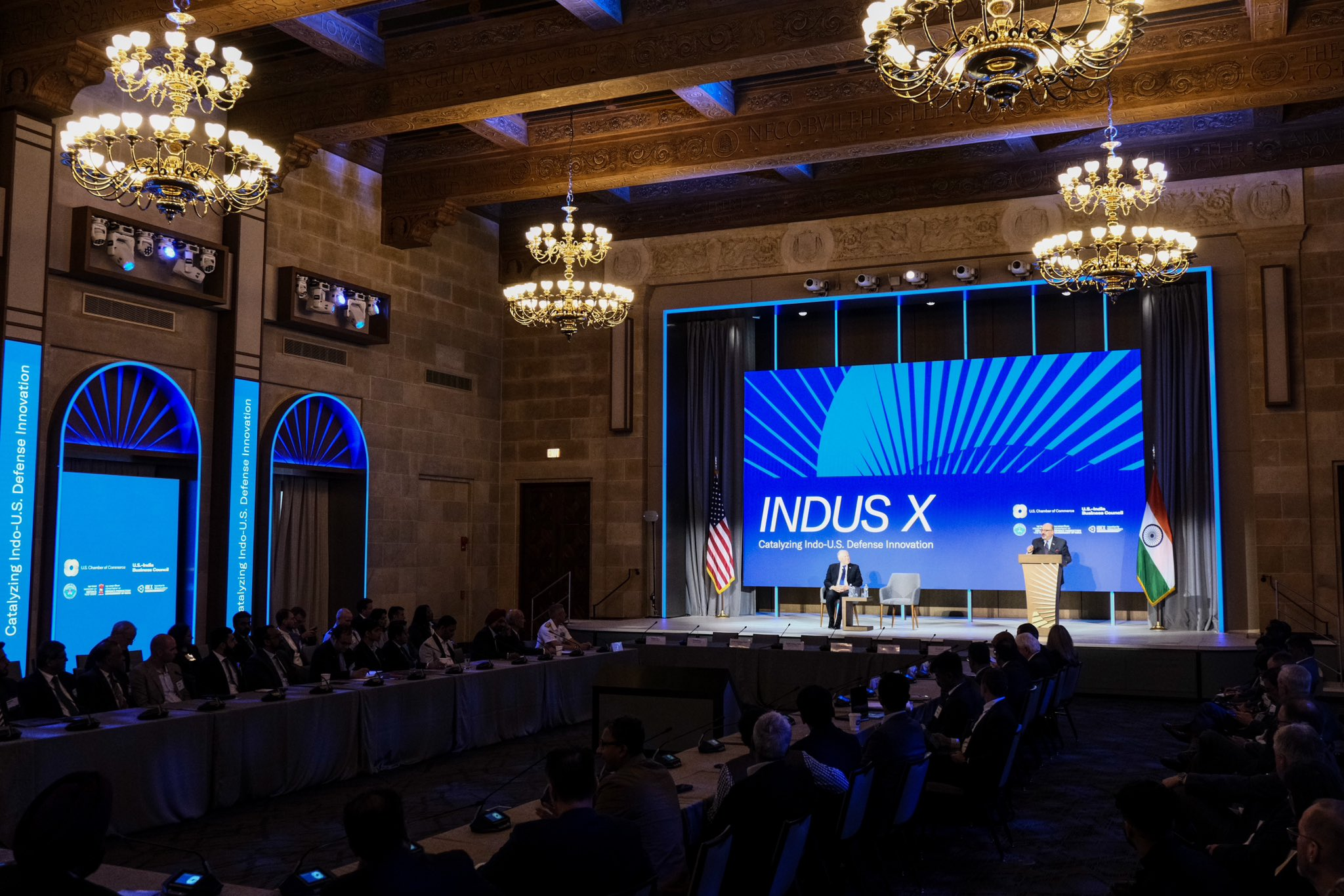
Launch of INDUS-X Conference at US Chamber of Commerce Headquarters in Washington, D.C.

Under Keshap, the U.S.-India Business Council (USIBC), which works to strengthen commercial ties between U.S and India, has seen the launch of numerous new initiatives vital to the India-U. S. partnership.

In January 2023, the Indian and U.S. Government and the U.S. Chamber launched the Initiative on Critical and Emerging Technology (iCET), that focuses on strengthening U.S.-India partnership on technologies that will drive global growth and bolster both countries’ economic competitiveness. NSA Jake Sullivan highlighted the importance of iCET at USIBC’S high-level round table, stating that “iCET is about much more than technology cooperation, it's a platform to accelerate our strategic convergence and policy alignment”.

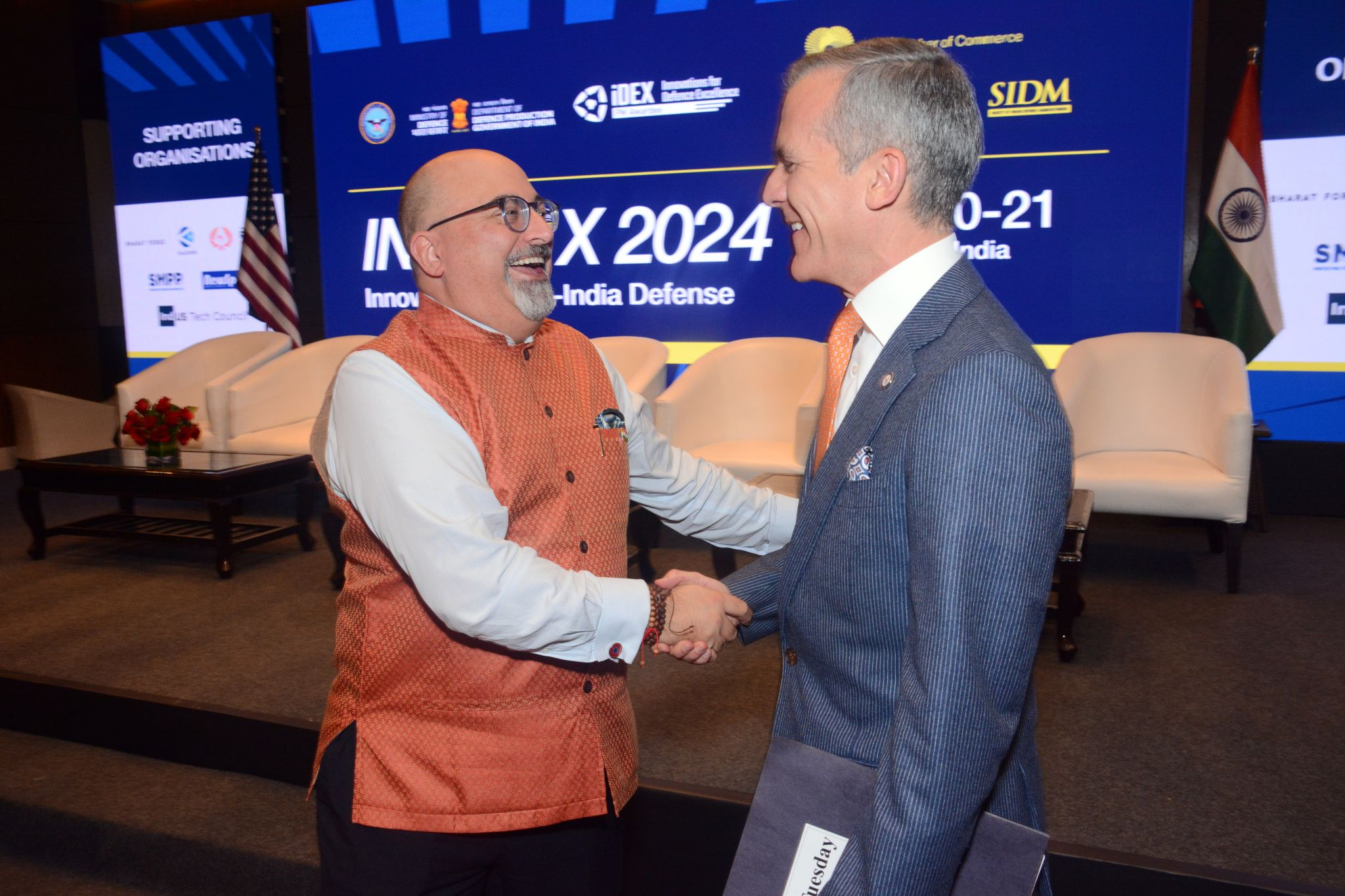
Amb. Keshap with U.S. Ambassador to India, Eric Garcetti, at the second edition of INDUS X.

In June 2023, as part of the iCET framework, USIBC hosted the launch of the inaugural India-U.S. Defense Acceleration Ecosystem (INDUS-X) conference to accelerate collaboration and innovation between U.S. and Indian defense ecosystems. The event witnessed high-level government involvement, participation of 25 U.S. and Indian start-ups, and a day long exhibition featuring new innovations in defense technology. The second edition of INDUS X was held in February, 2024 in New Delhi.

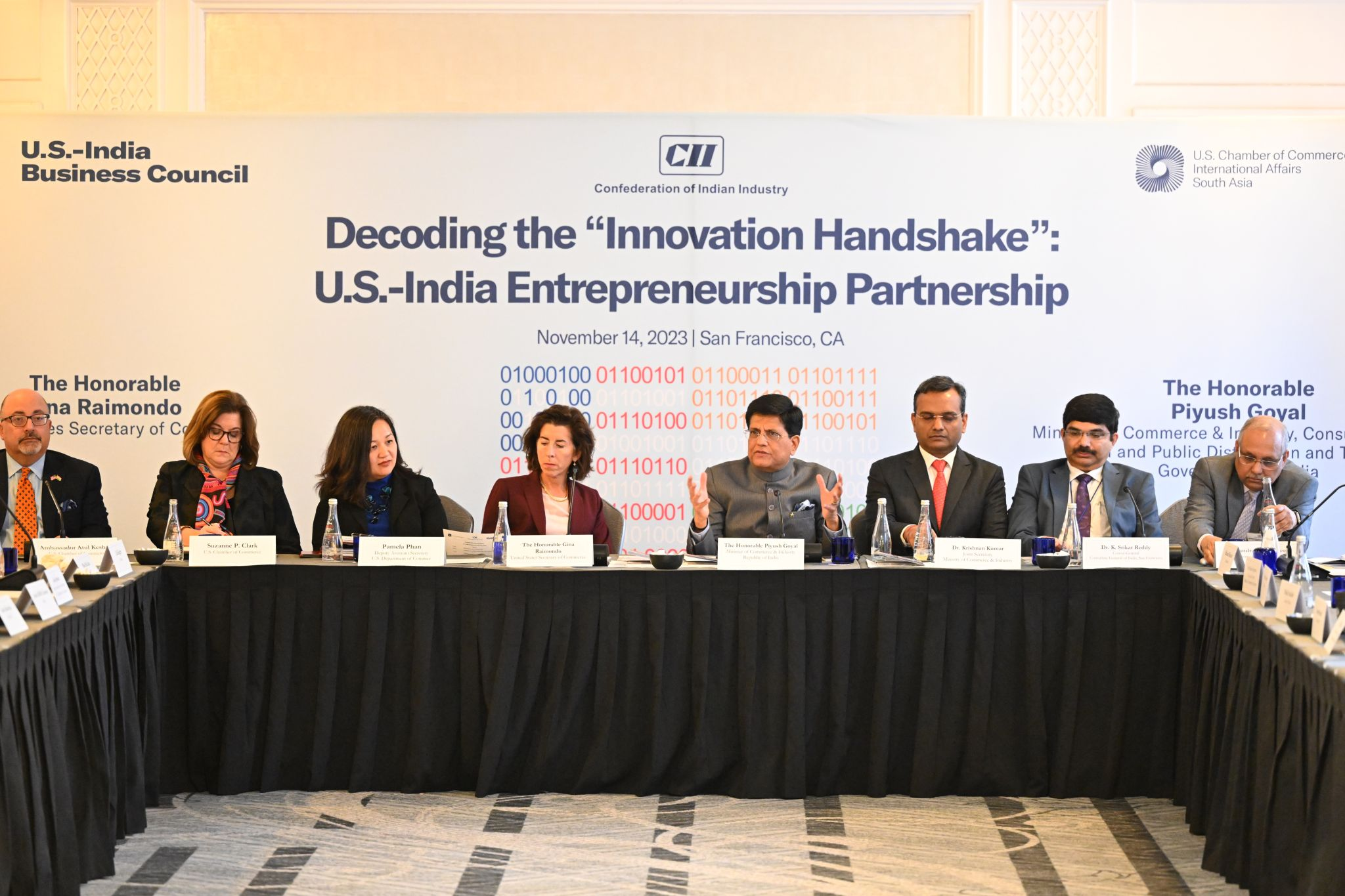
Keshap at the Innovation Handshake led by U.S. Secretary of Commerce Gina Raimondo and Indian Minister of Commerce Piyush Goyal

In November 2023, working with the U.S. and Indian Governments, Keshap and USIBC organized and launched the U.S.-India Innovation Handshake roundtable, an industry-driven collaborative effort promoting innovation and fostering the development of critical and emerging technologies. The second edition was held in March, 2024.

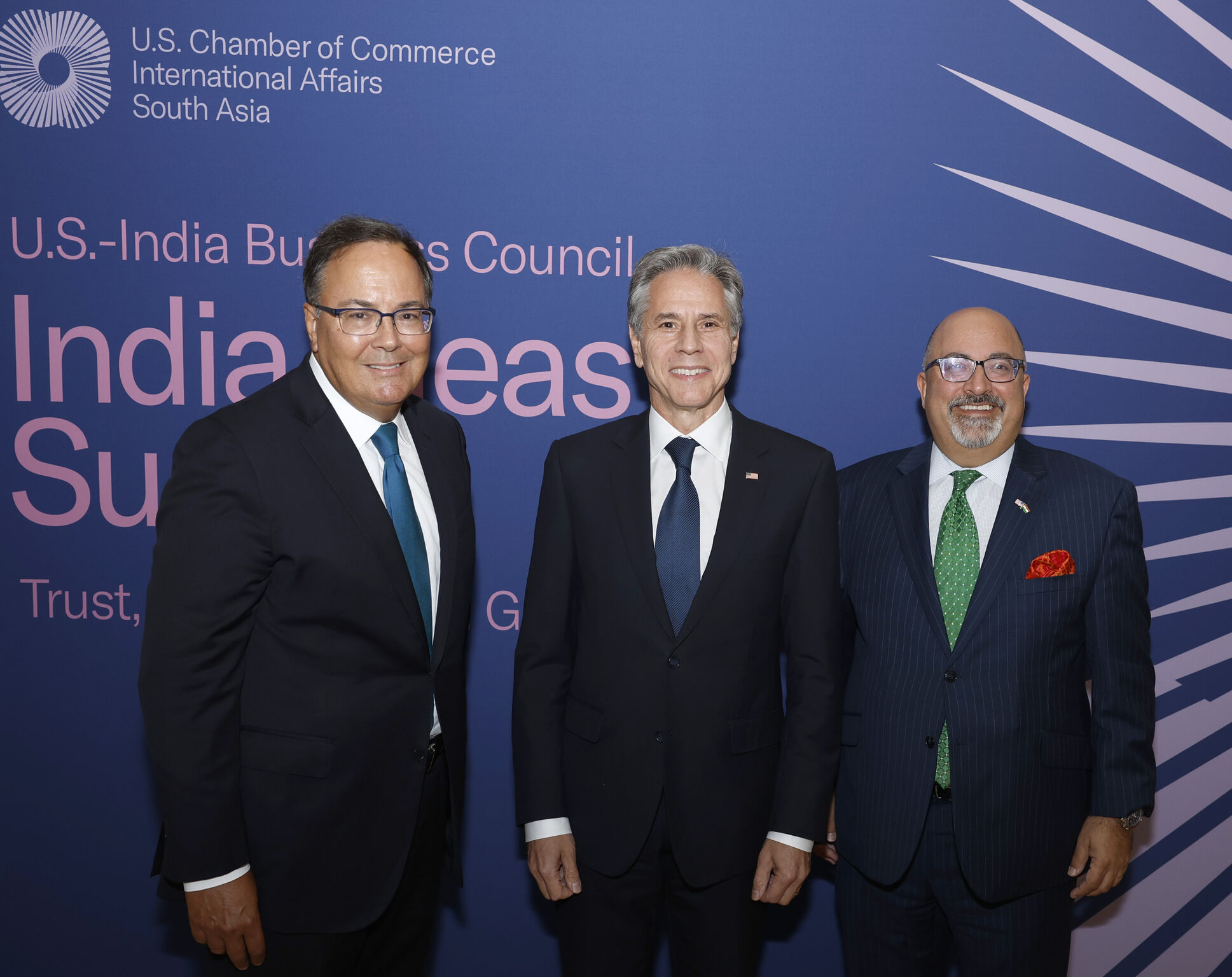
[From left to right] Executive Vice Chairman of Nasdaq Ed Knight, Secretary of State Antony Blinken and Amb. Atul Keshap at India Ideas Summit 2023

USIBC regularly convenes government, industry and thought leaders in the U.S.-India Corridor to improve India-U.S. trade, commercial, economic and defense ties. This includes the annual India Ideas Summit, which in 2023 featured US Secretary of State Antony Blinken, Commerce Secretary Gina Raimondo and other top government officials. Keshap frequently leads dialogues with top Indian and U.S. Ministers, including Indian External Minister S. Jaishankar, Finance Minister Nirmala Sitharaman, among others.

In March 2024, Keshap spoke to journalist Smita Prakash about a wide spectrum of issues, including his experience as a U.S. diplomat to India and insights into growing India-U.S. ties.

== Personal life ==
Originally from Charlottesville, Virginia, Keshap has also lived in Nigeria, Lesotho, Afghanistan, Zambia, and Austria. He is a graduate of the University of Virginia, where he received his Bachelor’s and Master's degrees. While there, he concentrated on Economics, International Relations, Diplomacy, and Religious Studies, as well as French. He is a Brother of the Alpha Delta Phi fraternity.

He is married to Karen Young Keshap, who is also a U.S. Foreign Service Officer. They have three daughters and a son.

Keshap has working proficiency in French and speaks conversational Hindi.

Diplomatic posts
Preceded by Andrew Mann	United States Ambassador to the Maldives; 2015–2018	Succeeded by Alaina B. Teplitz
Preceded by Andrew Mann	United States Ambassador to Sri Lanka; 2015–2018	Succeeded by Alaina B. Teplitz
