= Lymire melanocephala =

Scientific classification
- Kingdom: Animalia
- Phylum: Arthropoda
- Class: Insecta
- Order: Lepidoptera
- Superfamily: Noctuoidea
- Family: Erebidae
- Subfamily: Arctiinae
- Genus: Lymire
- Species: L. melanocephala

Binomial name
- Lymire melanocephala Walker, 1854

Species of moth

Lymire melanocephala is a moth of the subfamily Arctiinae. It was described by Francis Walker in 1854. It is found on Jamaica.
