= Walter K. Scott =

American diplomat and politician

Walter Kenneth Scott (June 2, 1915 – June 1977) was an Assistant Secretary of State for Administration from March 21, 1958, until July 22, 1959.

== Biography ==
Scott was born in Landover, Maryland and graduated from the University of Maryland. He enlisted in the U.S. Army during World War II and received commendations from France, Britain, Belgium and the United States for his service. From 1950 to 1955, he served as deputy assistant secretary of State followed by a 2-year stint as deputy director of management with the International Cooperation Administration. He was appointed and served as assistant secretary of State for administration in 1958 and 1959, and then consul general in Munich. From 1963 to 1965, he was minister-counselor in Lagos, Nigeria.

Mr Scott served as executive director of Radio Liberty in Munich, West Germany in 1965, retiring in 1973. Returning to Munich in 1975 to aid in the merger of Radio Free Europe and Radio Liberty, he died after suffering a heart attack at a nearby alpine resort in Lake Chiemsee a month before taking a planned second retirement.

Government offices
Preceded by Isaac W. Carpenter, Jr.	Assistant Secretary of State for Administration; March 21, 1958 – July 22, 1959	Succeeded by Lane Dwinell
