= Lymire senescens =

Scientific classification
- Kingdom: Animalia
- Phylum: Arthropoda
- Clade: Pancrustacea
- Class: Insecta
- Order: Lepidoptera
- Superfamily: Noctuoidea
- Family: Erebidae
- Subfamily: Arctiinae
- Genus: Lymire
- Species: L. senescens

Binomial name
- Lymire senescens Forbes, 1917

Synonyms
- Echeta flavicollis Dewitz, 1877; Lymire flavicollis; Lymire flavicollia Wolcott, 1923

Species of moth

Lymire senescens is a moth of the subfamily Arctiinae. It was described by William Trowbridge Merrifield Forbes in 1917. It is found in Puerto Rico.
