= Lymire candida =

Scientific classification
- Kingdom: Animalia
- Phylum: Arthropoda
- Clade: Pancrustacea
- Class: Insecta
- Order: Lepidoptera
- Superfamily: Noctuoidea
- Family: Erebidae
- Subfamily: Arctiinae
- Genus: Lymire
- Species: L. candida

Binomial name
- Lymire candida Forbes, 1917

Species of moth

Lymire candida is a moth of the subfamily Arctiinae. It was described by William Trowbridge Merrifield Forbes in 1917. It is found on Jamaica and Hispaniola.
