= Sheldon J. Krys =

American diplomat (1934–2024)

Assistant Secretary of State for Administration
- In office July 13, 1988 – August 7, 1989
- Preceded by: Donald J. Bouchard
- Succeeded by: Arthur W. Fort

2nd Assistant Secretary of State for Diplomatic Security
- In office August 9, 1989 – August 7, 1992
- Preceded by: Robert E. Lamb
- Succeeded by: Anthony C. E. Quainton

Personal details
- Born: June 15, 1934 New York City, New York, U.S.
- Died: October 18, 2024 (aged 90)
- Education: University of Maryland

Sheldon Jack Krys (June 15, 1934 – October 18, 2024) was an American diplomat who was the United States Ambassador to Trinidad and Tobago from 1985 to 1988, Assistant Secretary of State for Administration from 1988 to 1989, and Assistant Secretary of State for Diplomatic Security from 1989 to 1992.

== Biography ==
Sheldon J. Krys was born in New York City on June 15, 1934. He was educated at the University of Maryland, graduating in 1955.

Krys began a career in government service in 1961, when he became a consultant to the Director of the Federal Mediation and Conciliation Service. He spent 1962–65 as Director of the Department of State Reception Centers. As a member of the United States Foreign Service, he was a management officer in London 1965–66. From 1966 to 1969, he was special assistant to United States Ambassador to the United Kingdom David K. E. Bruce. In 1969, he became the State Department's Director of Personnel for Latin America. Krys, who was fluent in French and Serbo-Croatian, in 1974, was posted to Belgrade as administrative counselor. He spent 1976–77 studying at the National War College, and then served as a Foreign Service inspector 1977–79. He then became Executive Director of the Bureau of Near Eastern and South Asian Affairs in Washington, D.C. From 1983 to 1985, he was Deputy Director for Management Operations and executive assistant of Under Secretary of State for Management Ronald I. Spiers.

In 1985, President of the United States Ronald Reagan nominated Krys as United States Ambassador to Trinidad and Tobago. He served in this post from August 19, 1985, until April 24, 1988.

In 1988, Reagan nominated Krys as Assistant Secretary of State for Administration and he subsequently held this post from July 13, 1988, until August 7, 1989. President George H. W. Bush then named him Assistant Secretary of State for Diplomatic Security, and he held this office from August 9, 1989, until August 7, 1992.

After leaving government service, Krys became a lobbyist and consultant with the firm of Fletcher, Heald & Hildreth.

Krys was a member of the Peabody Awards Board of Jurors from 1989 to 1995, and again from 1996 to 1997. He served as Chair from 1993 to 1995.

Krys died on October 18, 2024, at the age of 90.

Diplomatic posts
Preceded by Melvin H. Evans	United States Ambassador to Trinidad and Tobago; August 19, 1985 – April 24, 1988	Succeeded by Charles A. Gargano
Government offices
Preceded by Donald J. Bouchard	Assistant Secretary of State for Administration; July 13, 1988 – August 7, 1989	Succeeded by Arthur W. Fort
Preceded by Robert E. Lamb	Assistant Secretary of State for Diplomatic Security; August 9, 1989 – August 7, 1992	Succeeded by Anthony C. E. Quainton
