= Arthur W. Fort =

Assistant Secretary of State for Administration
- In office August 9, 1989 – January 8, 1993
- Preceded by: Sheldon J. Krys
- Succeeded by: Patrick F. Kennedy

Personal details
- Born: June 25, 1936 (age 88)
- Education: Auburn University (BS); Stanford University (MS)

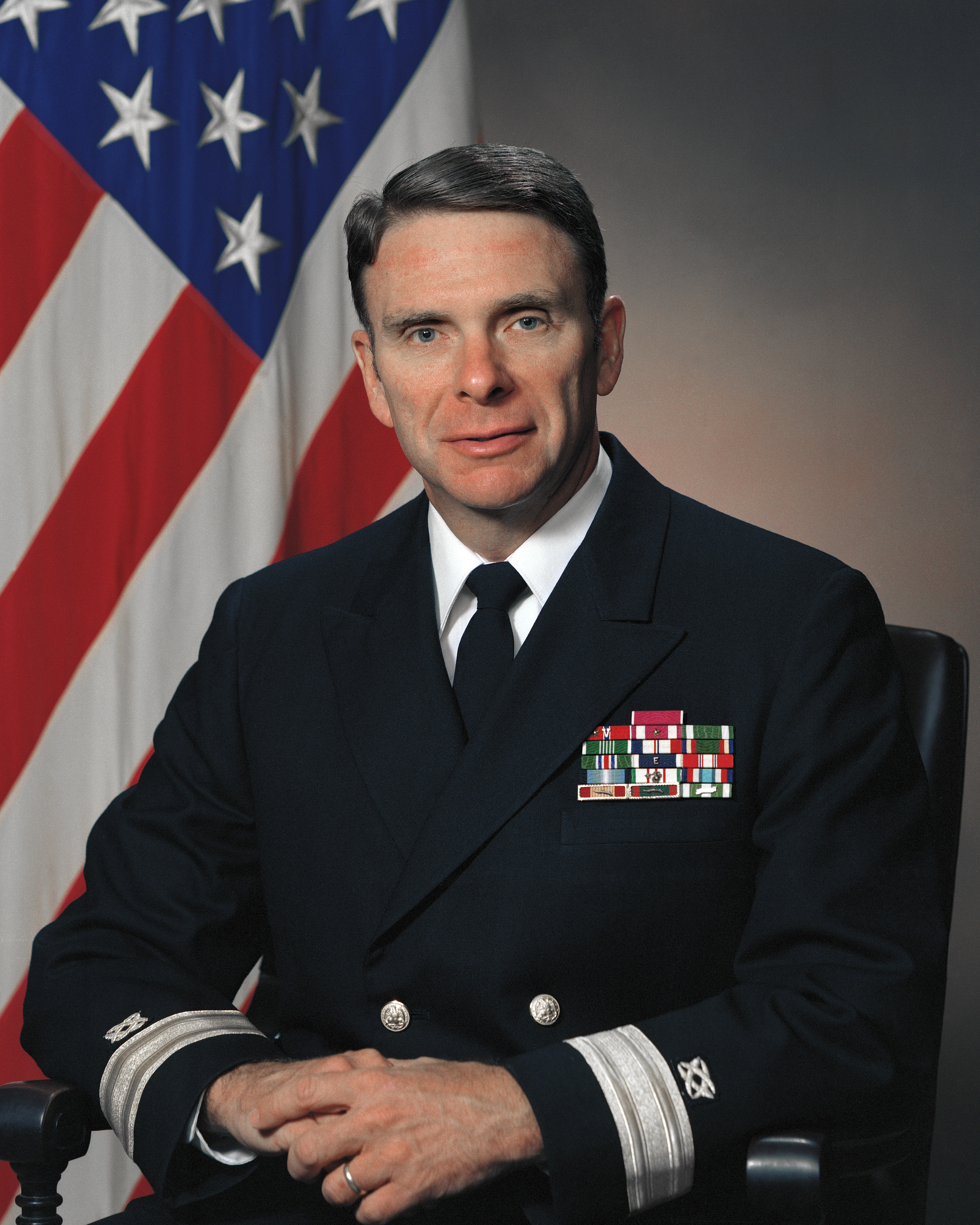
Arthur Fort as a Navy Commodore in 1983

Arthur William Fort (born June 25, 1936) was United States Assistant Secretary of State for Administration from 1989 to 1993. Trained in civil engineering and construction management, Fort was recognized for his efforts to modernize U.S. embassy facilities.

== Biography ==
Arthur Fort was educated at Auburn University, receiving a B.S. in civil engineering in 1958. He later received an M.S. in construction management from Stanford University in 1967.

After college, Fort joined the United States Navy, beginning a long career in the Navy. He would serve as operations officer, executive officer, and then commanding officer of a Seabee construction battalion. He was then Assistant Commander of Construction and Contracts for the Naval Facilities Engineering Command. He was then Commander of all Navy Seabee operations in the Atlantic Ocean/Mediterranean area. He was next Director of Construction in the Office of the United States Secretary of Defense. Next, he served as Commander of all Pacific Fleet Seabees and as Commander of the Pacific division of the Naval Facilities Engineering Command until his retirement from active duty as a rear admiral in 1988.

In July 1989, President of the United States George H. W. Bush nominated Fort as Assistant Secretary of State for Administration. After he was confirmed by the Senate, Fort was Assistant Secretary of State for Administration from August 9, 1989, until January 8, 1993.

Upon leaving government service in 1993, Fort became vice president of Holmes & Narver Inc., an Orange County-based engineering, architectural and construction services firm. Fort worked out of their office in Fairfax, Virginia. After leaving Holmes & Narver in 1998, he was elected to the National Academy of Construction in 2005.

Government offices
Preceded by Sheldon J. Krys	Assistant Secretary of State for Administration; August 9, 1989 – January 8, 1993	Succeeded by Patrick F. Kennedy
