= Joseph F. Donelan Jr. =

American government official

Joseph F. Donelan Jr. (February 16, 1918 – May 27, 1999) was United States Assistant Secretary of State for Administration from June 14, 1971, until March 31, 1973.

Donelan was educated at City College of New York and Georgetown University. He served in the United States Army during World War II. He held multiple appointments in the state department in Washington and also for several years at various times in France, Japan, India and Belgium.

Donelan was a graduate of Newtown High School in Queens, New York.

Government offices
Preceded by Francis G. Meyer	Assistant Secretary of State for Administration; June 14, 1971 – March 31, 1973	Succeeded by John M. Thomas
