= Carrie Cabelka =

American political advisor (born 1976)

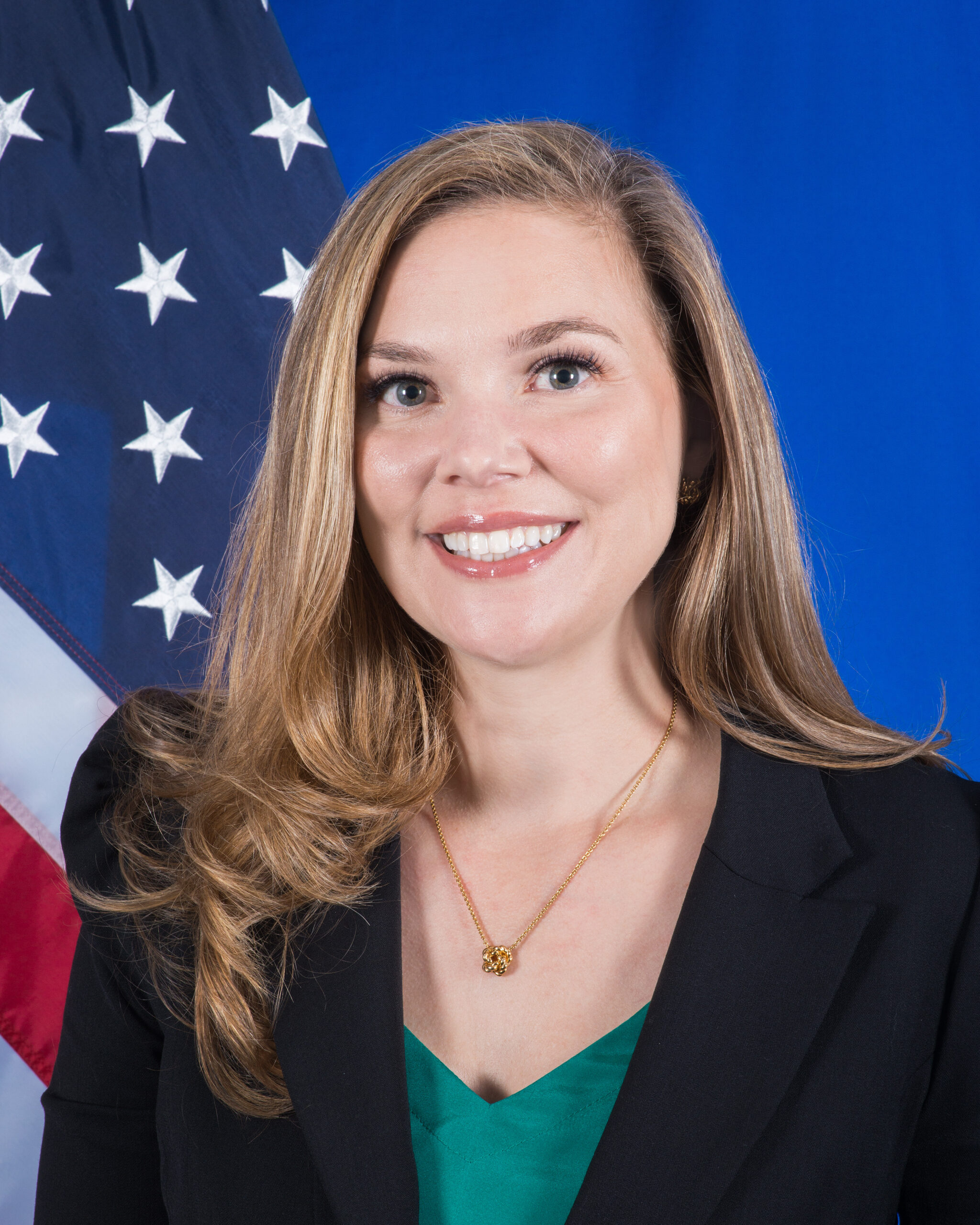

Assistant Secretary of State for Administration
- In office August 20, 2019 – January 20, 2021
- President: Donald Trump
- Preceded by: Nicole Nason
- Succeeded by: Alaina B. Teplitz

Personal details
- Born: San Diego County, California
- Education: Miami University (BA)

Carrie Cabelka is an American political advisor who previously served as Assistant Secretary of State for Administration. Cabelka assumed office on August 20, 2019, succeeding John W. Dinkelman.

== Early life and education ==
Raised in Michigan, Cabelka earned a Bachelor of Arts degree in history and political science from Miami University in Oxford, Ohio.

== Career ==
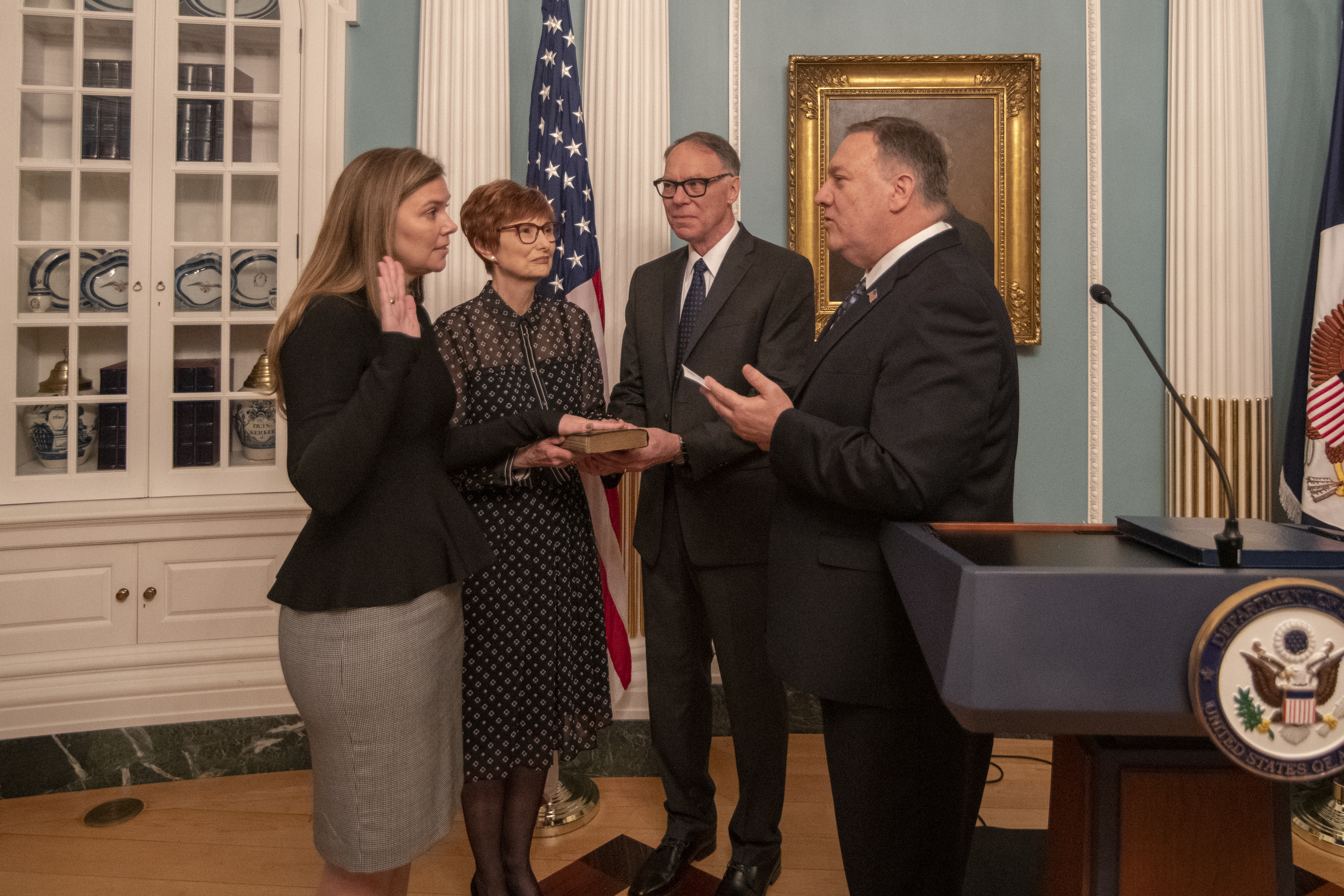
Cabelka is sworn in by Secretary of State Michael R. Pompeo as Assistant Secretary of State of the Bureau of Administration at the U.S. Department of State in Washington, D.C., on October 29, 2019.

After graduating from college, Cabelka worked on the campaign of Spencer Abraham. After Abraham was elected to the United States Senate, Cabelka worked as an aide in his office. Cabelka then joined the Bush–Cheney transition team. During the Bush administration, Cabelka served in the White House Office of Presidential Personnel and International Trade Administration. Cabelka later served as a liaison at the United States Office of Personnel Management, and later to the Secretary of State from 2005 to 2007.

After the end of the Bush administration, Cabelka worked as a program manager at Maximus Inc., an outsourcing company that provides health services for government agencies. After the election of Donald Trump, Cabelka was selected to serve as the White House Liaison to the United States Department of State. In July 2019, it was announced that Cabelka would serve as Assistant Secretary of State for Administration. She assumed office on August 20, 2019.
