= John M. Thomas =

John Morgan Thomas (Oct 12, 1926 - Feb 4, 2012) was United States Assistant Secretary of State for Administration from November 23, 1973, to June 28, 1979.

Government offices
Preceded by Joseph F. Donelan, Jr.	Assistant Secretary of State for Administration; November 23, 1973 – June 28, 1979	Succeeded by Thomas M. Tracy
