= Lymire albipedalis =

Scientific classification
- Domain: Eukaryota
- Kingdom: Animalia
- Phylum: Arthropoda
- Class: Insecta
- Order: Lepidoptera
- Superfamily: Noctuoidea
- Family: Erebidae
- Subfamily: Arctiinae
- Genus: Lymire
- Species: L. albipedalis

Binomial name
- Lymire albipedalis Gaede, 1926

Species of moth

Lymire albipedalis is a moth of the subfamily Arctiinae. It was described by Max Gaede in 1926. It is found in Puerto Rico.
