= Lymire vedada =

Scientific classification
- Kingdom: Animalia
- Phylum: Arthropoda
- Class: Insecta
- Order: Lepidoptera
- Superfamily: Noctuoidea
- Family: Erebidae
- Subfamily: Arctiinae
- Genus: Lymire
- Species: L. vedada

Binomial name
- Lymire vedada Schaus, 1938

Species of moth

Lymire vedada is a moth of the subfamily Arctiinae. It was described by William Schaus in 1938. It is found on Cuba.
