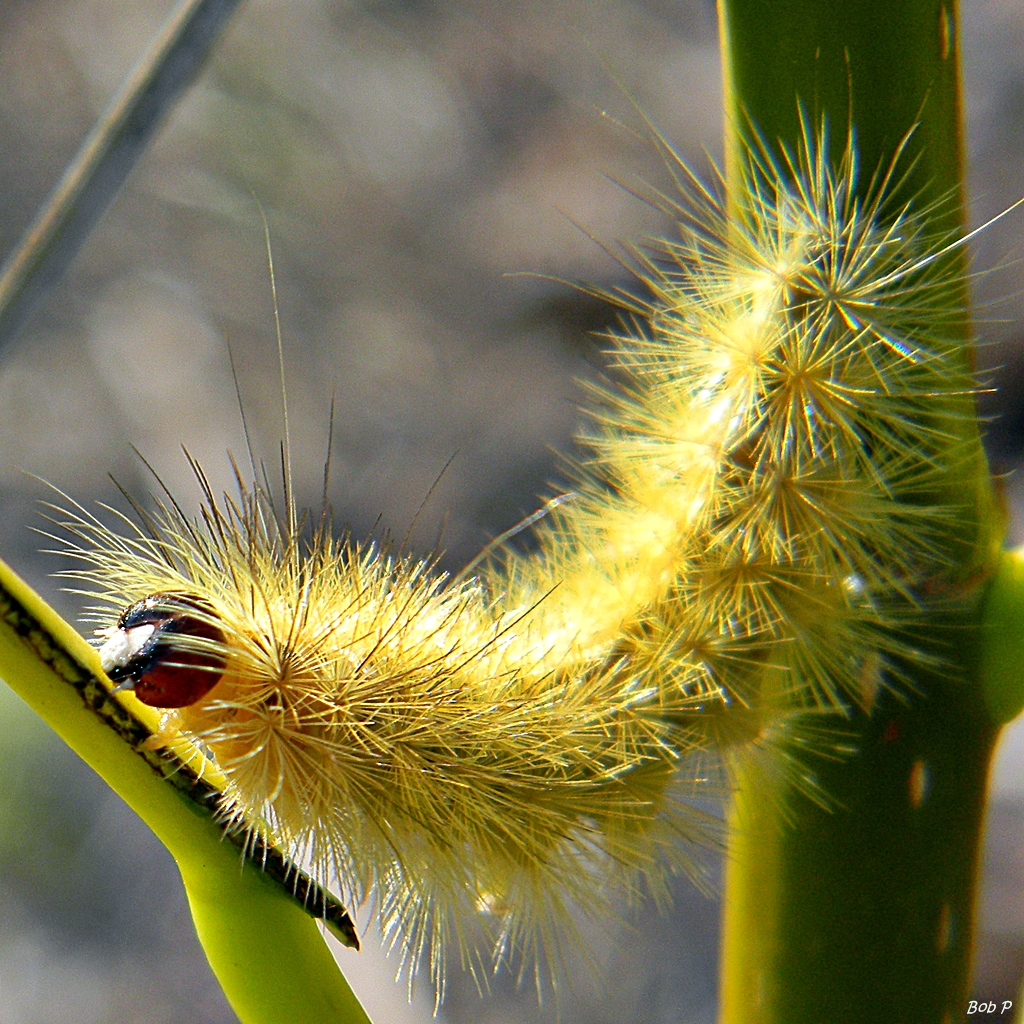
- Lymire edwardsii

Scientific classification
- Kingdom: Animalia
- Phylum: Arthropoda
- Class: Insecta
- Order: Lepidoptera
- Superfamily: Noctuoidea
- Family: Erebidae
- Subfamily: Arctiinae
- Subtribe: Ctenuchina
- Genus: Lymire; Walker, 1854

Synonyms
- Mallostethus Butler, 1876

= Lymire =

Genus of moths

Lymire is a genus of tiger moths in the family Erebidae. The genus was erected by Francis Walker in 1854.

== Species ==
- Lymire albipennis (Herrich-Schäffer, 1866)
- Lymire albipedalis Gaede, 1926
- Lymire candida Forbes, 1917
- Lymire edwardsii (Grote, 1881) – Edwards' wasp moth
- Lymire fulvicollis Dognin, 1914
- Lymire lacina Schaus, 1924
- Lymire melanocephala Walker, 1854
- Lymire metamelas (Walker, 1854)
- Lymire methyalea Dognin, 1916
- Lymire nitens (Rothschild, 1912)
- Lymire senescens Forbes, 1917
- Lymire strigivenia H. Druce, 1898
- Lymire vedada Schaus, 1938
