= Francis G. Meyer =

American public servant

Francis G. Meyer (December 14, 1913 – March 18, 1995) was United States Assistant Secretary of State for Administration from September 26, 1969, until May 31, 1971.

Meyer stated with the United States Department of Agriculture in 1933. He worked with the conservation corps. He later had a position related to state department, congressional relations. He was a resident of McLean, Virginia when nominated to his Assistant Secretary position.

Government offices
Preceded by Dwight J. Porter	Assistant Secretary of State for Administration; September 26, 1969 – May 31, 1971	Succeeded by Joseph F. Donelan, Jr.
