= Lymire metamelas =

Scientific classification
- Kingdom: Animalia
- Phylum: Arthropoda
- Class: Insecta
- Order: Lepidoptera
- Superfamily: Noctuoidea
- Family: Erebidae
- Subfamily: Arctiinae
- Genus: Lymire
- Species: L. metamelas

Binomial name
- Lymire metamelas (Walker, 1854)

Synonyms
- Glaucopis metamelas Walker, 1854

Species of moth

Lymire metamelas is a moth of the subfamily Arctiinae. It was described by Francis Walker in 1854. It is found in Pará, Brazil.
