= Carlisle H. Humelsine =

American diplomat and military officer

Carlisle Humelsine

Assistant Secretary of State for Administration
- In office August 11, 1950 – February 13, 1953
- President: Harry Truman
- Preceded by: John Peurifoy
- Succeeded by: Edward T. Wailes

Personal details
- Born: Carlisle Hubbard Humelsine; 1915 Hagerstown, Maryland, U.S.
- Died: January 25, 1989 (aged 73) Williamsburg, Virginia, U.S.
- Spouse: Mary
- Children: 2
- Education: University of Maryland

Military service
- Branch/service: United States Army
- Battles/wars: World War II

Carlisle Hubbard Humelsine (1915 – January 25, 1989) was an American diplomat and military officer who served as the Assistant Secretary of State for Administration from 1950 to 1953.

== Early life and education ==
Born in Hagerstown, Maryland, Humelsine graduated from the University of Maryland in 1937. During World War II, he reached the rank of full colonel at 29, earning the Distinguished Service Medal and the Bronze Star.

== Career ==
After the war, he spent six years at the State Department, serving four secretaries of state including Dean Acheson and John Foster Dulles.

While at the State Department, Humelsine was instrumental in orchestrating the persecution of suspected homosexual employees known as the Lavender scare. In June 1950, he wrote a three-page memo to Under Secretary James E. Webb titled "Problem of Homosexuals and Sex Perverts in the Department of State" which described how the State Department, under the direction of then Assistant Secretary for Administration John Peurifoy, began investigating and firing suspected homosexuals in 1947. Humelsine laid out the agency's homophobic rationales for considering homosexuals to be undesirable as employees.

James Webb delivered Humelsine's paper to Senator Clyde R. Hoey during a meeting discussing the Senate subcommittee's investigation into the employment of homosexuals in the Federal workforce. Humelsine then served as the State Department's spokesperson throughout the Senate investigation, which culminated in the subcommittee's report declaring homosexuals to be unsuitable for government employment.

In 1958, he began a 27-year tenure as president, then chairman, of Colonial Williamsburg. Under his leadership, Williamsburg became one of America’s most popular historical attractions. Humelsine was chairman of the National Trust for Historic Preservation, and a trustee for the National Geographic Society, National Gallery of Art and Smithsonian Institution.

== Personal life ==
Humelsine and his wife, Mary, had two daughters. He died in Williamsburg, Virginia, on January 25, 1989, at the age of 73.

In 2004, Virginia Route 199, in Williamsburg, Virginia, was renamed the "Humelsine Parkway" in honor of Humelsine.

Government offices
| Preceded by John Peurifoy | Assistant Secretary of State for Administration; August 11, 1950 – February 15, 1953 | Succeeded by Edward T. Wailes |
Non-profit organization positions
| Preceded by | Chairman, National Trust for Historic Preservation | Succeeded by |
| Preceded by | President, Colonial Williamsburg Foundation, Inc. 1958-1985 | Succeeded by Charles Longsworth |
| Preceded by Winthrop Rockefeller | Chairman, Colonial Williamsburg Foundation yyyy-1983 | Succeeded by |
