= Bureau of Administration =

U.S. State Department division

Bureau overview
- Jurisdiction: Executive branch of the United States
- Headquarters: Harry S. Truman Building, Washington, D.C., United States
- Bureau executive: José Cunningham, Assistant Secretary of State for Administration
- Parent department: U.S. Department of State
- Website: state.gov/a

The Bureau of Administration ("A Bureau") is part of the U.S. Department of State. The Bureau is responsible for administrative support operations, including procurement; supply and transportation; real property and facilities management; diplomatic pouch and mail services; official records, publishing, and library services; language services; setting allowance rates for U.S. Government personnel assigned abroad and providing support to the overseas schools educating their dependents; overseeing safety and occupational health matters; small and disadvantaged business utilization; and support for both White House travel abroad and special conferences called by the President or Secretary of State. It is headed by the Assistant Secretary of State for Administration.

== Offices ==
Offices in the Bureau of Administration include the following:

- Office of the Assistant Secretary
- Office of the Executive Director
- Office of the Procurement Executive
- Office of Acquisitions Policy
- Office of Acquisitions Management
- Office of Emergency Management
- Commissary and Recreation Affairs
- Office of Allowances
- Office of Language Services
- Office of Overseas Schools
- Office of Real Property Management
- Office of Facilities and Management Services
- Office of General Services Management
- Privacy Staff
- Office of Directives Management
- Office of Information Programs and Services
- Office of Global Publishing Solutions
- Office of Logistics Operations
- Office of Program Management and Policy
- Office of Small and Disadvantaged Business Utilization
