= Donald J. Bouchard =

U.S. Assistant Secretary of State from 1985 to 1987

Donald J. Bouchard (born 1937) was the United States Assistant Secretary of State for Administration from 1985 to 1987.

== Biography ==
Donald J. Bouchard was born in Waterville, Maine on June 18, 1937. He was educated at the University of California, Berkeley.

Bouchard joined the United States Department of State in 1962, serving in various administrative posts in Africa until 1972. At that time, he moved to Washington, D.C. to serve as special assistant in the Office of the Under Secretary of State for Management. He then spent 1976-79 at the U.S. Embassy, Ottawa, working as an administrative counselor. He was administrative counselor at the United States Embassy in Madrid 1979-81. From 1981 to 1984, he was Executive Director of the Bureau of Inter-American Affairs.

In 1985, President of the United States Ronald Reagan nominated Bouchard as Assistant Secretary of State for Administration and Bouchard served in that office from December 12, 1985 until November 30, 1987.

Government offices
Preceded by Robert E. Lamb	Assistant Secretary of State for Administration; December 12, 1985 – November 30, 1987	Succeeded by Sheldon J. Krys
