= Armin H. Meyer =

American diplomat

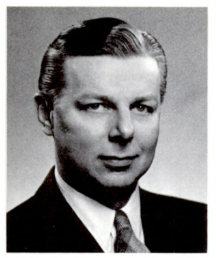

34th United States Ambassador to Japan
- In office July 3, 1969 – March 27, 1972
- President: Richard Nixon
- Preceded by: U. Alexis Johnson
- Succeeded by: Robert S. Ingersoll

34th United States Ambassador to Iran
- In office 1965 – 1969
- President: Lyndon B. Johnson
- Preceded by: Julius C. Holmes
- Succeeded by: Douglas MacArthur II

7th United States Ambassador to Lebanon
- In office 1961 – 1965
- President: John F. Kennedy; Lyndon B. Johnson
- Preceded by: Robert McClintock
- Succeeded by: Dwight J. Porter

Personal details
- Born: Armin Henry Meyer; January 19, 1914 Fort Wayne, Indiana, U.S.
- Died: August 13, 2006 (aged 92)
- Parents: Armin P. (father); Leona Buss Meyer (mother)
- Education: Ohio State University

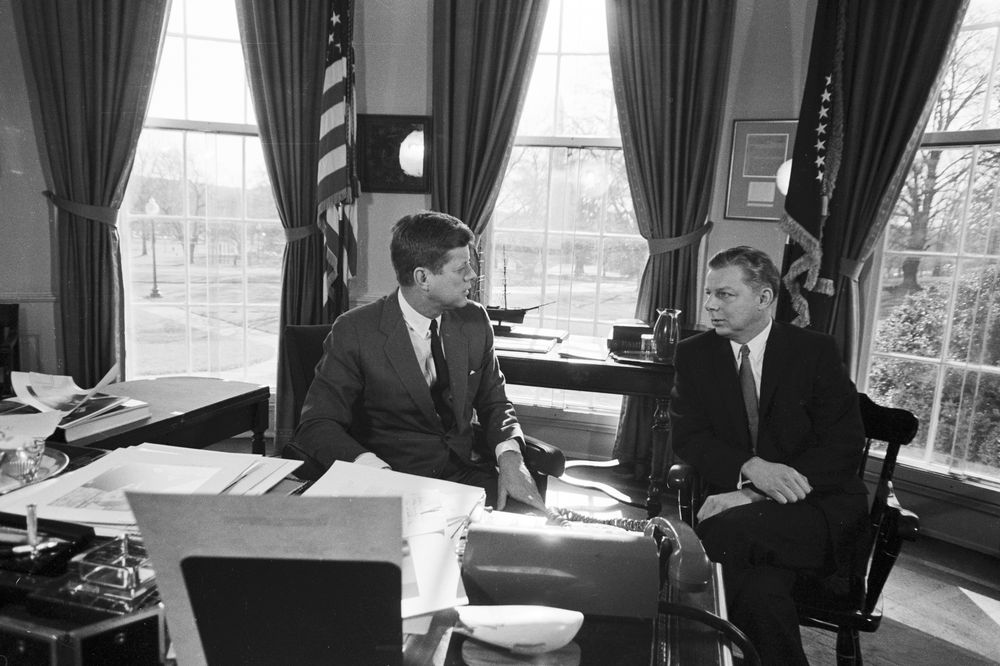
President John F. Kennedy meets with US Ambassador to the Republic of Lebanon, Armin H. Meyer.

Armin Henry Meyer (19 January 1914, in Fort Wayne, Indiana – 13 August 2006) was an American diplomat who served as United States Ambassador to Lebanon (1961 to 1965), United States Ambassador to Iran (1965–1969), and United States Ambassador to Japan (1969–1972).

Meyer found his tenure in Japan to be "particularly challenging ... because he faced the task of ‘easing the shock of President Nixon’s historic breakthrough to China.’" During his ambassadorship, he was involved in negotiations leading to the Okinawa Reversion Agreement, which transferred administrative authority over the Ryukyu Islands and Daitō Islands to Japan in 1972. After Richard Nixon created a task force on international terrorism following the killing of Israeli athletes during the Munich massacre at the 1972 Summer Olympics, Meyer returned to the State Department to head the task force.

Meyer's parents were Armin P., a Lutheran minister, and Leona Buss Meyer. Leona died when Armin was three and then he was raised by three aunts in Lincoln, Illinois.

Meyer graduated from Capital University in 1939. In 1941, he earned a master's degree in mathematics at Ohio State University. In 1943, Meyer joined the staff of the United States Office of War Information in Cairo.

== Publications ==
Assignment Tokyo: An Ambassador's Journal (1974)
