= Lymire albipennis =

Scientific classification
- Kingdom: Animalia
- Phylum: Arthropoda
- Class: Insecta
- Order: Lepidoptera
- Superfamily: Noctuoidea
- Family: Erebidae
- Subfamily: Arctiinae
- Genus: Lymire
- Species: L. albipennis

Binomial name
- Lymire albipennis (Herrich-Schäffer, 1866)

Synonyms
- Echeta albipennis Herrich-Schäffer, 1866

Species of moth

Lymire albipennis is a moth in the subfamily Arctiinae first described by Gottlieb August Wilhelm Herrich-Schäffer in 1866. It is endemic to Cuba.
