= Lymire fulvicollis =

Scientific classification
- Domain: Eukaryota
- Kingdom: Animalia
- Phylum: Arthropoda
- Class: Insecta
- Order: Lepidoptera
- Superfamily: Noctuoidea
- Family: Erebidae
- Subfamily: Arctiinae
- Genus: Lymire
- Species: L. fulvicollis

Binomial name
- Lymire fulvicollis Dognin, 1914

Species of moth

Lymire fulvicollis is a moth of the subfamily Arctiinae. It was described by Paul Dognin in 1914. It is found in French Guiana.
