= Charles A. Gargano =

Italian-American actor, businessman and government official

United States Ambassador to Trinidad and Tobago
- In office August 9, 1988 – June 7, 1991
- President: Ronald Reagan; George H. W. Bush
- Preceded by: Sheldon J. Krys
- Succeeded by: Sally G. Cowal

Personal details
- Born: October 28, 1934 (age 92) Sant'Angelo dei Lombardi, Avellino, Italy
- Party: Republican

Charles A. Gargano (born October 28, 1934, in Sant'Angelo dei Lombardi, Avellino, Italy) is an Italian-American actor, businessman and government official who was the U.S. Ambassador to Trinidad and Tobago. He was the chairman of the Empire State Development Corporation during the tenure of Governor George Pataki.

== Life and career ==
Gargano was born in Avellino, Italy and his family emigrated to the United States when he was 4. His family settled in the Park Slope neighborhood in the New York City borough of Brooklyn.

Following and in between a career in construction (including founding his own firm) Gargano served in government; first in 1981 as deputy administrator of the United States Urban Mass Transit Administration and then from 1988 until 1991 as the United States Ambassador to Trinidad and Tobago.

From 1995 until 2007 Gargano served as chairman of the Empire State Development Corporation and vice chairman of the Port Authority of New York and New Jersey, both positions of which he was appointed to by the then Governor of New York State, George Pataki. During this span Gargano was often referred to as the New York State "Economic Czar".

In 2008 President George W. Bush selected Gargano to become the next United States Ambassador to Austria but after congressional inaction eventually the nomination was withdrawn.

A Village Voice article "The Magician's Nephew" (searchable using DuckDuck Go) in which he was accused of influence peddling with his nephew attorney Frank Gargano was the main reason for the withdrawal.

== In films ==
In 1997 Gargano and then United States Senator Alfonse D'Amato made cameo appearances in The Devil's Advocate starring Keanu Reeves and Al Pacino as themselves in their real life roles as New York Politicians.

Gargano appeared as a Maitre d'hotel in the 2003 film Analyze That starring Robert De Niro and Billy Crystal.

He also appears as a Port Authority Police commander in Oliver Stone's 2006 film World Trade Center.

== See also ==
- Christopher O. Ward
- Austin Tobin
