= Isaac W. Carpenter Jr. =

American business executive and federal political appointee

Assistant Secretary of State for Administration
- In office June 23, 1954 – January 25, 1955
- President: Dwight D. Eisenhower
- Preceded by: Edward T. Wailes
- Succeeded by: Loy W. Henderson
- In office August 11, 1955 – December 15, 1957
- President: Dwight D. Eisenhower
- Preceded by: Loy W. Henderson
- Succeeded by: Walter K. Scott

Personal details
- Born: January 5, 1893
- Died: May 6, 1983 (aged 90); Omaha, Nebraska, U.S.
- Resting place: Forest Lawn Memorial Park
- Spouse(s): Elizabeth Balch Reed (m. 1918; died 1964) Fredericka Clara Nash

Isaac White Carpenter Jr. (January 5, 1893 – May 6, 1983) was an American business executive and federal political appointee. He was the president of the Carpenter Paper Company in Omaha, Nebraska, for over 20 years, retiring in 1961 when the company was sold. He served in the Eisenhower administration as Assistant Secretary of State for Administration from 1954 to 1957.

== Early life ==
Carpenter was born to Isaac W. and Caroline Mary (née Batchelder) Carpenter. His father had moved to Omaha from Illinois in 1888 and incorporated the paper company with a brother in 1890. By 1925 the business had branches in Kansas City, Denver, Salt Lake City, Des Moines, Billings, Chicago, Sioux City, and Lincoln. His father, as company president, was one of 50 members elected in 1898 to the board of directors of the Trans-Mississippi and International Exposition world's fair.

== Business career ==
Circa 1940, Carpenter became the president of his family's paper company. In March 1961, the sale of Carpenter Paper Company to Champion Paper and Fibre Company was approved by both companies' stockholders. Upon that sale, Carpenter retired.

Champion Paper and Fibre had formed from the 1935 merger of Champion Coated Paper Company of Ohio and Champion Fibre Company of North Carolina. The combined company would merge with the U.S. Plywood Corporation in 1967 and was renamed Champion International in 1972. It bought the St. Regis Corporation in 1984, and sold its Canton, North Carolina, plant to the employees in 1999, resulting in a separate company. Champion was ultimately acquired by International Paper in 2000.

== Public service ==
Carpenter was appointed as Assistant Secretary of State for Administration by President Dwight D. Eisenhower on June 16, 1954, and began duty a week later on June 23. His service continued in that role until January 26, 1955, when he assumed the new and equivalent rank of Comptroller, responsible for budgeting and fiscal affairs, operating the personnel program, and overseeing the provision of administrative services. Carpenter then took on a combined role as Assistant Secretary for Administration on August 11, 1955, during a recess of the Senate. He was recommissioned after confirmation on January 25, 1956, and remained in that service until termination on December 15, 1957.

== Personal life ==
Carpenter Jr. married his first wife, Elizabeth Balch Reed, in 1918. She had been honored as queen of the Knights of Ak-Sar-Ben ball in 1917. Elizabeth, a granddaughter of real estate businessman and local politician Byron Reed, died in 1964, sometime after which Carpenter married Fredericka Clara Nash.

== See also ==
- Jobbers Canyon Historic District

Government offices
Preceded by Edward T. Wailes	Assistant Secretary of State for Administration; June 23, 1954 – January 25, 1955	Succeeded by Loy W. Henderson
Preceded by Loy W. Henderson	Assistant Secretary of State for Administration; August 11, 1955 – December 15, 1957	Succeeded by Walter K. Scott
