= Lymire nitens =

Scientific classification
- Domain: Eukaryota
- Kingdom: Animalia
- Phylum: Arthropoda
- Class: Insecta
- Order: Lepidoptera
- Superfamily: Noctuoidea
- Family: Erebidae
- Subfamily: Arctiinae
- Genus: Lymire
- Species: L. nitens

Binomial name
- Lymire nitens (Rothschild, 1912)

Synonyms
- Trichodesma nitens Rothschild, 1912

Moth of the subfamily Arctiinae from Venezuela

Lymire nitens is a moth of the subfamily Arctiinae. It was described by Rothschild in 1912. It is found in Venezuela.

The length of the forewings is about 20 mm. The forewings are black-brown with a broad cinnamon-buff oblique band beyond the cell. The hindwings are black, very strongly glossed with purple.
