= Loy W. Henderson =

American diplomat (1892-1986)

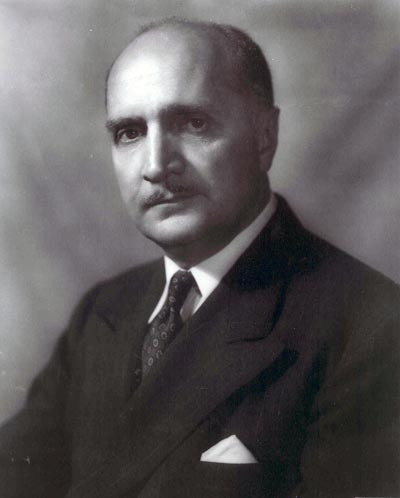

United States Ambassador to Iran
- In office September 29, 1951 – December 30, 1954
- President: Harry S. Truman; Dwight D. Eisenhower
- Preceded by: Henry F. Grady
- Succeeded by: Selden Chapin

United States Ambassador to India
- In office November 19, 1948 – September 21, 1951
- President: Harry S. Truman
- Preceded by: Henry F. Grady
- Succeeded by: Chester Bowles

United States Minister to Iraq
- In office November 20, 1943 – April 7, 1945
- President: Franklin D. Roosevelt
- Preceded by: Thomas M. Wilson
- Succeeded by: George Wadsworth II

Personal details
- Born: June 28, 1892 Rogers, Arkansas, U.S.
- Died: March 24, 1986 (aged 93) Bethesda, Maryland, U.S.
- Awards: President's Award for Distinguished Federal Civilian Service (1958)

Loy Wesley Henderson (June 28, 1892 – March 24, 1986) was a United States Foreign Service Officer and diplomat.

== Background ==
Loy Wesley Henderson was born on June 28, 1892, in Rogers, Arkansas, to a poor Methodist preacher. He attended college in a small town in Kansas before transferring to Northwestern University.

== Career ==
=== Early career ===
An arm injury prevented Henderson from fighting in World War I, so he served as a Red Cross volunteer instead.

In 1922, Henderson joined the United States Foreign Service.

=== Eastern Europe and USSR ===
After an initial consular tour in Ireland, Henderson began a 24-year focus on Soviet and Eastern European Affairs. He then investigated the connection between the Soviet Comintern and left wing organizations in the United States while serving in Latvia, Lithuania, and Estonia.

In 1933, the Roosevelt Administration extended diplomatic recognition to the Soviet Union and Henderson was assigned to Russia to help reopen the U.S. Embassy in Moscow. Aiding him in this task were fellow junior officers George F. Kennan and Charles Bohlen, who along with Henderson would later be considered the Department's top Soviet specialists. In 1935, the Kremlin broke its pledge not to interfere in U. S. domestic politics. In response, Ambassador Bullitt returned to Washington in disgust, leaving Henderson for a time as chargé d'affaires in Moscow. As chargé, Henderson warned Washington that the Soviet Union was likely to cooperate with Nazi Germany. Four years later, Moscow signed the Soviet-German Non-aggression Pact of 1939. Henderson was one of the contributors to the Welles declaration of 1940, which established US non recognition policy of Baltic states occupation by Soviet Union.

Henderson deeply distrusted the Kremlin and was at odds with the enthusiasm most Americans—and President Roosevelt—had in early 1942 for their new Soviet wartime allies. On the occasion of the third anniversary of the establishment of diplomatic relations between the United States and the Soviet Union, however, he submitted in a memorandum as Chargé in the Soviet Union to the Secretary of State, Cordell Hull, dated November 16, 1936, a description of the failure of the last years giving a lot place to the arguments of the Soviet side to raise a better understanding. Nevertheless, Eleanor Roosevelt and other Soviet sympathizers in the White House pressured the State Department to transfer Henderson out of the Soviet section. As a result, Henderson was sent to Baghdad as the U.S. ambassador to Iraq. "A man of the highest character, absolutely incorruptible....Overruled time after time, he asked in 1943 to be relieved of his duties as chief of the division".

=== Near Eastern Affairs ===
In between serving as U.S. Minister in Iraq (1943–45), Ambassador to India (1948–51) and Ambassador to Iran (1951–54), Henderson returned to Washington in 1945 to serve at the State Department as the director of the Office of Near Eastern Affairs.

In 1945, Syrians in Damascus led an uprising against French rule. In response, French forces bombed Damascus. Henderson, as head of Near Eastern Affairs, advised President Harry Truman to force the French to withdraw. Henderson argued that the French bombing undermined not only the newly created United Nations but also the West's relations with the Arab world. Henderson correctly predicted that if the West did not maintain close relations with Syria, it would fall into the Soviet sphere.

In early 1946, Soviet troops advanced south to the outskirts of Tabriz in northwestern Iran, sparking an early Cold War stand-off known as the Iran crisis. Henderson showed the Truman administration how such movements threatened Turkey, Iraq, and the Iranian oil fields. Following Henderson's advice, Truman issued a stern warning to Stalin. Stalin thereafter pulled back his troops.

Henderson came under fierce criticism from San Francisco attorney Bartley Crum, who had served on the Anglo-American Committee of Inquiry formed to examine political, economic and social conditions in Mandatory Palestine and to make recommendations for both short-term and long-term solutions to problems in the region. Crum named Henderson as a symbol of State Department duplicity in supporting the Arab cause in Palestine.

In late 1946, the Kremlin attempted to bully Ankara into ceding territory in eastern Turkey and control of the Dardanelles, which would have given Moscow its long-desired warm water port. Henderson, with Acting Secretary of State Dean Acheson, convinced Truman to express support for Turkey and to dispatch navy units to the eastern Mediterranean. In response, the Soviets withdrew some of their demands.

In 1947, the British embassy in Washington informed Henderson that the United Kingdom was no longer able to bolster the pro-Western forces against the Communist agitators in the Greek Civil War. Once again, Henderson convinced Truman to actively defend Western interests in the Mediterranean against Soviet encroachment. Henderson designed the Truman Doctrine plans to strengthen Greece and Turkey, an early move which would influence U.S. containment policy for decades to come.

In 1948, Henderson clashed with domestic groups lobbying for the creation of the state of Israel. Secretary of State George C. Marshall and Henderson, speaking for the Department of State, opposed the United Nations resolution dividing Palestine into Jewish and Arab states, as they felt Israel would not be able to defend itself and would ruin Washington's relationships with the Arab world; their view was that the area should remain a trust under the UN. On the other side, Presidential advisors such as David Niles and Clark Clifford, along with American Jewish groups and much of the general public, favored the partition of Palestine into the State of Israel and an Arab state. Henderson was harshly criticized for his opposition to the creation of Israel. His views did not prevail in 1948 and his transfer to the ambassadorship for India was rumored by his supporters to have been the result of political pressure from the pro-Zionist groups. In 1954, he was appointed as Assistant Secretary of State for Administration.

In his Oral Interview with the Truman Library, Henderson was asked about the pressure he and others were under regarding the establishment of Israel. Henderson stated:

"During the years 1945-1948, various of my Jewish friends had tried to warn me that I was making powerful enemies who could make life miserable for me. I can recall that a Jewish member of Congress with whom I had friendly relations, had given me a fair warning. He had said, 'Loy, I want to tell you that you will be in deep trouble if you continue to adhere to what is believed to be your present attitude with regard to the establishment of the Jewish State. Can’t you at least modify your stand and just let affairs take their natural course? If you continue to advise our Government against supporting the setting up of a Jewish State, your career can be ruined, and I don't know what else might happen to you.'"

Henderson returned to the Middle East in 1951 as Ambassador to Iran. There he dealt with the newly elected prime minister, Mohammed Mossadegh, on questions associated with Iran's oil reserves previously owned by British interests that Mossadegh had recently nationalized. The United States was opposed to the nationalization, and he helped orchestrate the 1953 CIA-assisted coup which removed Mossadegh, a democratically elected leader. In 1956, he was named a Career Ambassador.

He retired in 1960 and spent seven years teaching International Relations at Washington, D.C.'s American University. His memoirs, entitled "A Question of Trust: the origins of U.S.-Soviet diplomatic relations" were published in 1986.

== Death ==
Henderson died at 93 on March 24, 1986, in a Bethesda, Maryland, nursing home.

The Iranian-American historian Ervand Abrahamian objected that the obituary of Henderson in The New York Times did not mention his role in the 1953 Iranian coup d'état, which he described as "probably his most important contribution." He wrote to the Times: "Few ambassadors have so decisively changed the course of a country's history. What is more, he set a State Department precedent by permitting secret agents to use the embassy compound to carry out the coup. Your oversight would have amused George Orwell; it certainly would not have surprised him."

== Legacy ==
A conference room in the State Department headquarters, the Harry S Truman Building, is named in his honor.

== Career summary ==
| Position | Host country or organization | Year |
|---|---|---|
| US Consular Service | Dublin, Ireland | 1922 to 1924 |
| US Foreign Service | Riga, Latvia | 1924 to 1927 |
| US Foreign Service | Kovno, Lithuania | 1927 to 1930 |
| US Foreign Service | Tallinn, Estonia | 1930 to 1933 |
| US Foreign Service | Moscow, Soviet Union | 1934 to 1938 |
| US Foreign Service | U.S.A., Eastern European Affairs Bureau | 1938 to 1943 |
| US Foreign Service | Moscow, Soviet Union | 1943 |
| U.S. Ambassador | Baghdad, Iraq | 1943 to 1945 |
| US Foreign Service | U.S.A., head of Near Eastern Affairs Bureau | 1945 to 1948 |
| U.S. Ambassador | New Delhi, India | 1948 to 1951 |
| U.S. Ambassador | Tehran, Iran | 1951 to 1954 |
| US Foreign Service | U.S.A., Deputy Under Secretary of State for Administration | 1955 to 1960 |

Diplomatic posts
| Preceded by Thomas M. Wilson | United States Minister to Iraq; November 20, 1943 – April 7, 1945 | Succeeded by George Wadsworth II |
| Preceded by Henry F. Grady | United States Ambassador to India; November 19, 1948 – September 21, 1951 | Succeeded by Chester Bowles |
| Preceded by Henry F. Grady | United States Ambassador to Iran; September 29, 1951 – December 30, 1954 | Succeeded by Selden Chapin |
Government offices
| Preceded by Isaac W. Carpenter, Jr. | Assistant Secretary of State for Administration; January 26, 1955 – August 9, 1955 | Succeeded by Isaac W. Carpenter, Jr. |
