= Thomas M. Tracy =

American administrator (born 1936)

Thomas M. Tracy (born July 8, 1936) of Florida was a United States Assistant Secretary of State for Administration.

He was born in Great Barrington, Massachusetts. He was awarded a B.A. from Colgate University in 1958, an M.A. from Stanford University in 1959, and an M.B.A. from Columbia University in 1973.

He entered the Foreign Service in 1960 and after postings to Juarez, Birmingham, London, and the State Department was appointed administrative officer in Brussels from 1973 to 1975. He was then counselor for administration in Moscow from 1975 until 1978, after which he was counselor for administration in Bonn.

He followed John M. Thomas as Assistant Secretary of State for Administration from September 25, 1979, until August 30, 1983.

Government offices
| Preceded by John M. Thomas | Assistant Secretary of State for Administration; September 25, 1979 – August 30, 1983 | Succeeded by Robert E. Lamb |
