= Office of Language Services =

Office in the U.S. State Department that provides interpretation and translation services

The Office of Language Services is the office responsible for providing official foreign language interpretation and translation support for the U.S. Department of State, the White House, the National Security Council, and Cabinet-level officials from other federal agencies. The office's mission statement is to "advance American security and prosperity by providing foreign language support for the State Department, the White House, and other federal agencies. We serve as the ears, voice, and words in foreign languages of the President of the United States, the First Lady of the United States, the Vice President of the United States, the Secretary of State, the National Security Advisor, and other Cabinet officials."

Interpreters from the Office of Language Services support the President and the Secretary of State at high-level summits and visits. The Office of Language Services also translates the text of treaties and other international agreements. Translations by this office are considered official Department of State translations, and thus may be certified for use as evidence in court.

== History ==
Language support for the conduct of U.S. foreign policy dates back to 1789 during the tenure of Thomas Jefferson, the first U.S. Secretary of State.
