= Jan Lacina =

Czech politician

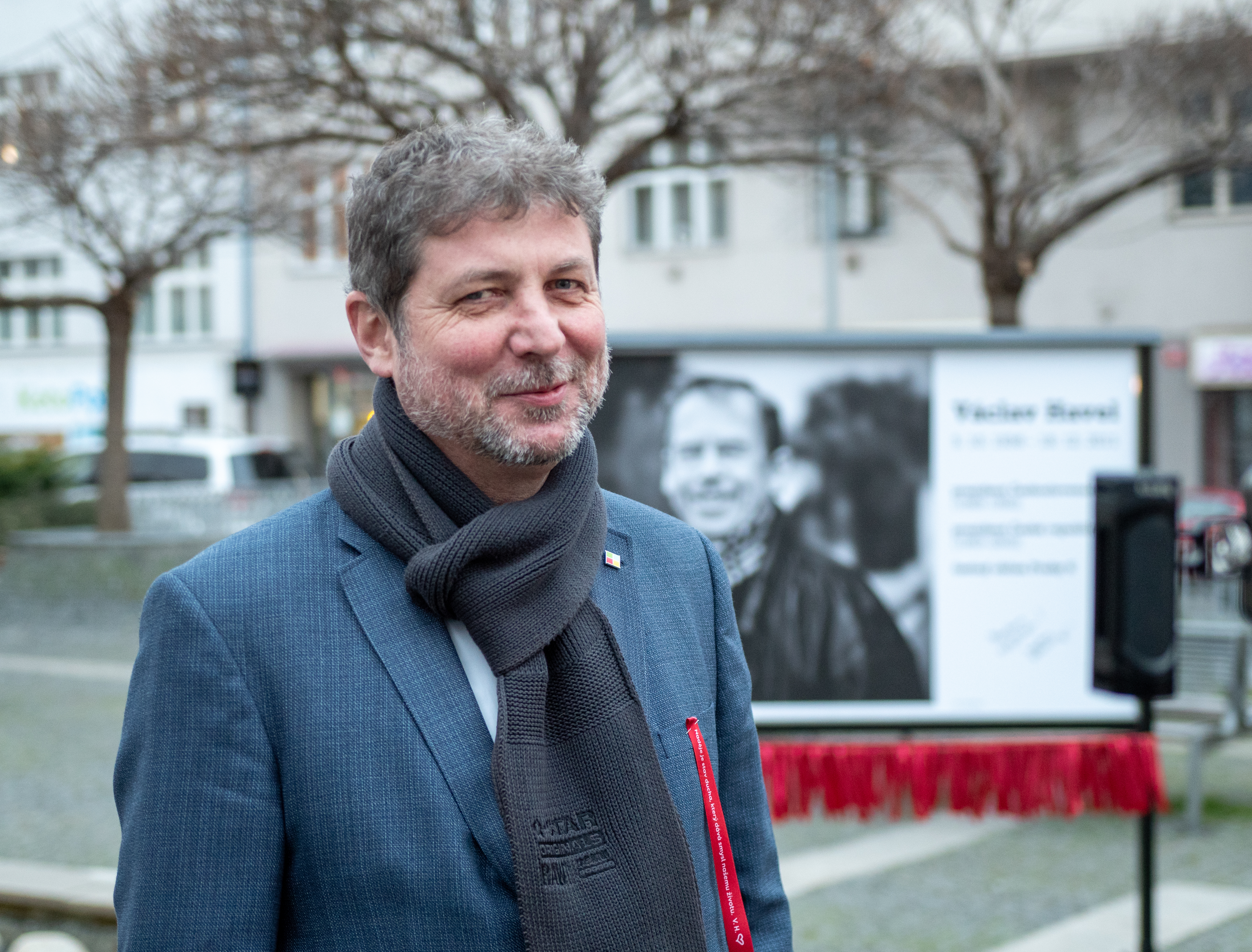

Member of the Czech Parliament for Prague, Czech Republic
- In office 9 October 2021 – 8 October 2025

Councillor of Prague 6
- Incumbent
- Assumed office 24 October 2022

Personal details
- Born: 25 January 1970 (age 56) Prague, Czechoslovakia
- Party: Mayors and Independents
- Children: Laura Sára, Adam Sebastian
- Parent(s): Jiří Lacina, Milada Divišová
- Education: University of West Bohemia, Charles University
- Occupation: Politician
- Website: https://www.jan-lacina.cz/

Jan Lacina (born 25 January 1970) is a Czech politician, since October 2022 Councillor of Prague 6 district, and from October 2021 to October 2025 a member of the Chamber of Deputies of the Czech Republic.

== Life ==
He studied at the Faculty of Physical Education and Sport at Charles University in Prague. After the election of Václav Havel as Czechoslovak president on 29 December 1989, he ended his football coaching studies and started to work as a journalist.

From 1990 to 1997, he worked as a reporter for the print media, Czech Radio, Czech Television and other commercial stations. From 1998 to 2013, he worked as a television producer, screenwriter, director and lyricist. From 1998 to 2000, he was also the media strategist for the Prague – European Capital of Culture 2000 project. On November 17, 2009, he was in charge of daylong project Albertov 16:00 aired by the Czech Television with the subtitle "Live Broadcast from the Past", analyzing just 20 years after the start of the so-called Velvet Revolution all major events that initiated political change in Czechoslovakia and turned communist totalitarianism into a liberal democratic system.

He also published several books. Before the fourth and last election of Václav Havel as the Czech president in 1998, his book Havel na Hrad! has come out. In 2013, he ended all activities in the media. He runs several Prague cafés.

== Political career ==
Since 2013, he has been a registered supporter of the Mayors and Independents political movement. In 2015, he became its member. Since 2021, the Mayors and Independents movement has become the second strongest government party and part of the liberal-conservative pro-European government of the Prime Minister Petr Fiala. In 2022, he was elected as a vice-chairman of the Mayors and Independents. In May 2025, he was replaced by Karel Dvořák.

== Local politics ==
In the years 2014–2021, as Deputy Mayor of Prague 6, Lacina initiated a range of completed art installations in public space.

- Ferdinand Vaňek's bench from 2017 is the monument dedicated to the last Czechoslovak and the first Czech president Václav Havel.
- Žofie Chotková's fan was established in 2019 in honor of the Countess of Czech origin, the wife of the heir to the Austro-Hungarian throne, Archduke Franz Ferdinand of Austria. The couple was murdered in 1914 by an assassin in Sarajevo which became the trigger for World War I.
- The Maria Theresa monument, unveiled in October 2020 on the 300th anniversary of Maria Theresa's accession to the Habsburg throne, is the only monument dedicated to this important European queen and the only ruling woman on the Czech throne in the Czech Republic.
- Lacina personally managed the removal of the statue of Ivan Konev from Bubeneč's Interbrigade Square, where it had stood since 1980, to the depository of the Museum of Memory of the 20th Century on April 30, 2020. The move unleashed stormy reactions on the side of the Russia, representatives of the Communist Party, political extremists and the last two Czech presidents: Václav Klaus and Miloš Zeman.

== Education and family ==
He studied Political Science, International Relations and also Media Studies. He holds a bachelor's degree in Political Science and International Relations from the Faculty of Arts at the University of West Bohemia in Plzeň and a master's degree in Media Studies from the Faculty of Social Sciences, Charles University in Prague, focusing on public service media. He lives in his hometown district: Prague 6-Bubeneč and raises two children: Laura Sára (2006) and Adam Sebastian (2008).
