= Lymire lacina =

Scientific classification
- Kingdom: Animalia
- Phylum: Arthropoda
- Class: Insecta
- Order: Lepidoptera
- Superfamily: Noctuoidea
- Family: Erebidae
- Subfamily: Arctiinae
- Genus: Lymire
- Species: L. lacina

Binomial name
- Lymire lacina Schaus, 1924

Species of moth

Lymire lacina is a moth of the subfamily Arctiinae. It was described by William Schaus in 1924 and is found in Cuba.
