= Patricia A. Lacina =

American diplomat (born 1960)

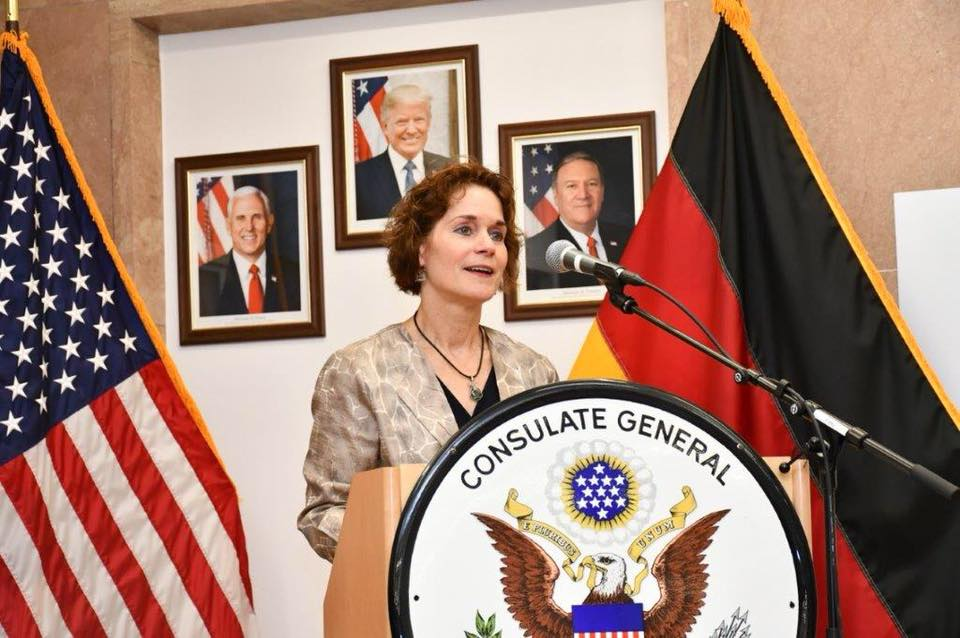
- Lacina in 2018

U.S. Chargé d'affaires to India
- In office September 9, 2021 – October 24, 2022
- President: Joe Biden
- Preceded by: Atul Keshap
- Succeeded by: A. Elizabeth Jones

Personal details
- Born: May 1960 (age 66)
- Spouse: Carlos Zapata
- Children: 1
- Education: University of Northern Iowa (BA), California State University at Sacramento (MA)

Patricia A. Lacina is an American diplomat who served as chargé d'affaires to India (2021–2022), consul-general at the U.S. Consulate in Frankfurt, Germany (2018–2021), principal deputy executive secretary in the office of the Secretary of State (2015–2017), and deputy chief information officer for business management and planning and chief knowledge officer (2013–2015).

== Early life and education ==
Lacina was born in May 1960. She earned a Bachelor of Arts in special education and Spanish from the University of Northern Iowa. She earned a Master of Arts in international affairs from California State University at Sacramento. She is married to Carlos Zapata, with whom she has a daughter who lives in New York City.

== Career ==
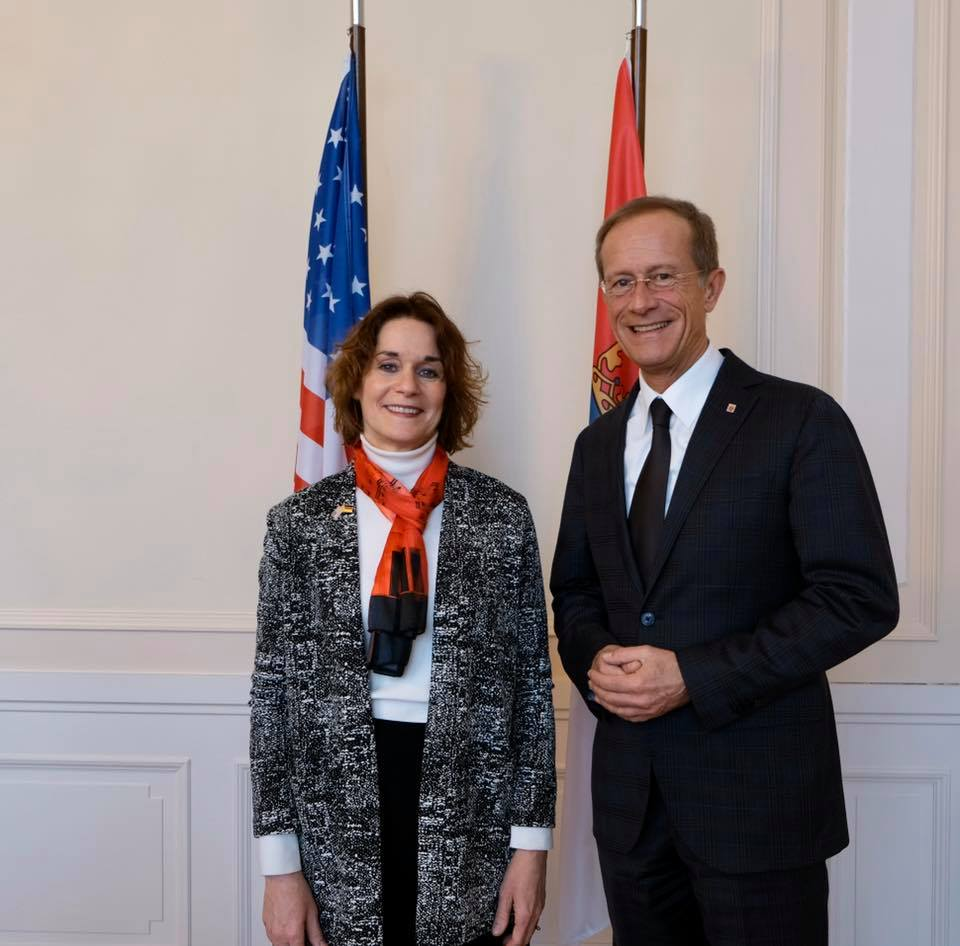
Lacina with Hesse Minister of State Axel Wintermeyer at the Hesse State Chancellery in Wiesbaden, 2020

Lacina served as consul general at the U.S. Consulate in Frankfurt, Germany, from 2018 to 2021, principal deputy secretary in the office of the Secretary of State from 2015 to 2017, and deputy chief information officer for business management and planning from 2013 to 2015.

=== Overseas assignments ===
- Management officer in Cairo
- Deputy director of Frankfurt's Regional Support Center
- Director of human resources in Vienna and Brussels

=== U.S. chargé d'affaires to India ===
Lacina was appointed as the chargé d'affaires on the United States mission to India by President Joe Biden to replace Atul Keshap, who held the office from June 2021 to September 2021. Lacina held the position from September 9, 2021, to October 24, 2022. She was replaced by A. Elizabeth Jones.

Lacina lauded the establishment of India's first clinics for the trans and queer community. They were funded by the U.S.
