= Outerbridge Horsey (diplomat) =

US diplomat (1910–1983)

Outerbridge Horsey VI (October 1, 1910 – August 18, 1983) was a United States diplomat who served as First Secretary Consul at Rome (1947–1955), Deputy Chief of Mission (DCM) in Tokyo (1956–1958), DCM in Rome (1959–1963), and U.S. Ambassador to Czechoslovakia (1963–1966).

Born in New York, Horsey was educated at Downside School in Somerset, England, Trinity College, Cambridge, and the Massachusetts Institute of Technology. Horsey died of cancer at the Georgetown University Hospital, in Washington, D.C.

== See also ==
- Outerbridge Horsey
