= Alaina B. Teplitz =

American diplomat (born 1969)

Alaina Teplitz
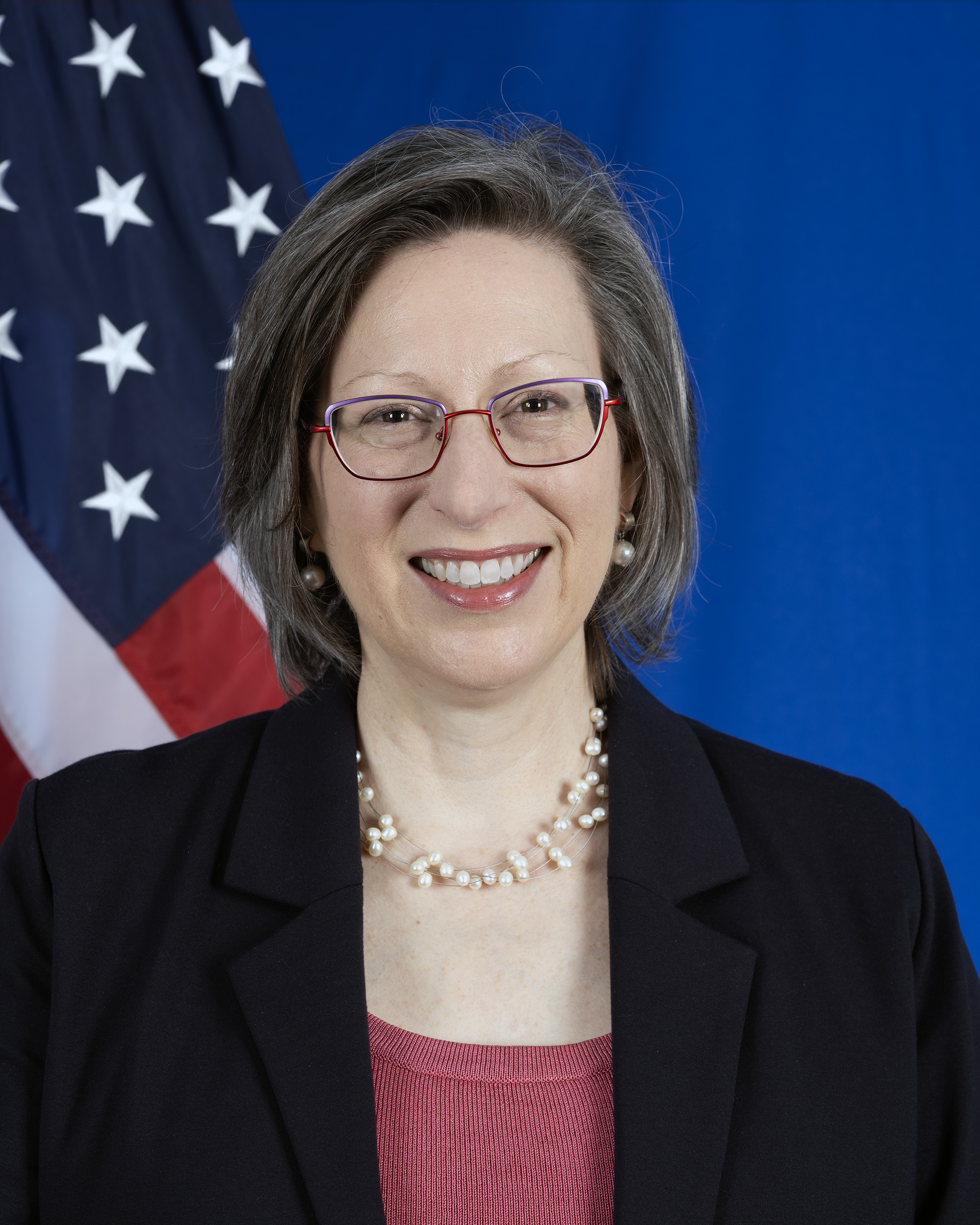

Assistant Secretary of State for Administration
- In office December 6, 2021 – January 20, 2025
- President: Joe Biden
- Preceded by: Carrie Cabelka
- Succeeded by: José Cunningham

United States Ambassador to Sri Lanka and the Maldives
- In office November 1, 2018 – December 6, 2021
- President: Donald Trump; Joe Biden
- Preceded by: Atul Keshap
- Succeeded by: Julie J. Chung

United States Ambassador to Nepal
- In office October 7, 2015 – August 8, 2018
- President: Barack Obama; Donald Trump
- Preceded by: Peter W. Bodde
- Succeeded by: Randy W. Berry

Personal details
- Born: 1969 (age 56–57)
- Education: Georgetown University (BS); Indiana University, Bloomington (MPA)

Alaina B. Teplitz (born 1969) is an American diplomat who served as the U.S. Assistant Secretary of State for Administration from 2021 to 2025. She also served as the U.S. Ambassador to Sri Lanka and Maldives from 2018 to 2021 and the U.S. Ambassador to Nepal from 2015 to 2018. A career member of the Senior Foreign Service with the rank of Career Minister, she joined the State Department in 1991 and is the recipient of numerous Superior and Meritorious Honor Awards.

== Education ==
Teplitz holds a Bachelor of Science in Foreign Service from the Walsh School of Foreign Service and a Master's in Public Administration from Indiana University's School of Public and Environmental Affairs.

== Career ==
Teplitz was the Director of the Management Training Division at the State Department's Foreign Service Institute from 2007 to 2009. She served as the Deputy Executive Director of the Near East and South and Central Asia Bureau's joint executive office from 2009 to 2011, where she handled the South and Central Asia portfolio, including Afghanistan and Pakistan. She was Minister Counselor for Management at U.S. Embassy Kabul from 2011 to 2012. From 2012 to 2015, Teplitz held the Assistant-Secretary ranked position of Director of the Under Secretary for Management's Office of Policy, Rightsizing, and Innovation (M/PRI) at the Department of State. Under her leadership, M/PRI found innovative ways to reform our bureaucracy and improve the way that our diplomatic service operates. Teplitz championed efforts to improve knowledge management, data use, and risk management.

Previous assignments include Management Counselor in Dhaka, Bangladesh and deputy director of the Joint Administrative Services supporting three U.S. Missions – the U.S. Mission to NATO, the U.S. Mission to the European Union, and the Embassy to the Kingdom of Belgium – in Brussels, Belgium. Her previous posts also include: Ulaanbaatar, Tirana, and Sydney.

=== United States Ambassador to Nepal ===
On March 26, 2015, President Barack Obama announced that Teplitz would serve as the United States Ambassador to Nepal. On August 5, 2015, she was confirmed in the United States Senate by voice vote. She presented her credentials on October 7, 2015.

=== United States Ambassador to Sri Lanka and the Maldives ===
On May 25, 2018, President Donald Trump announced Teplitz to serve as the United States Ambassador to Sri Lanka and the Maldives. On September 6, 2018, she was confirmed in the Senate by voice vote. She was sworn into office on October 22, 2018. She presented her credentials in Sri Lanka on November 1, 2018 and in the Maldives on November 18, 2018.

=== Assistant Secretary of State for Administration ===
On December 3, 2021, President Joe Biden announced Teplitz to serve as the Assistant Secretary of State for Administration. She was sworn in on December 6, 2021. On January 15, 2025, President-elect Trump requested Teplitz's resignation.

== Personal life ==
Teplitz is married and has two sons.

Diplomatic posts
Preceded by Peter W. Bodde	United States Ambassador to Nepal; 2015–2018	Succeeded by Randy W. Berry
Preceded by Atul Keshap	United States Ambassador to Sri Lanka and the Maldives; 2018–2021	Succeeded by Julie J. Chung
