= Assistant Secretary of State for Administration =

U.S. government position

United States Assistant Secretary of State for Administration
- Seal of the United States Department of State

- Flag of an assistant secretary of state

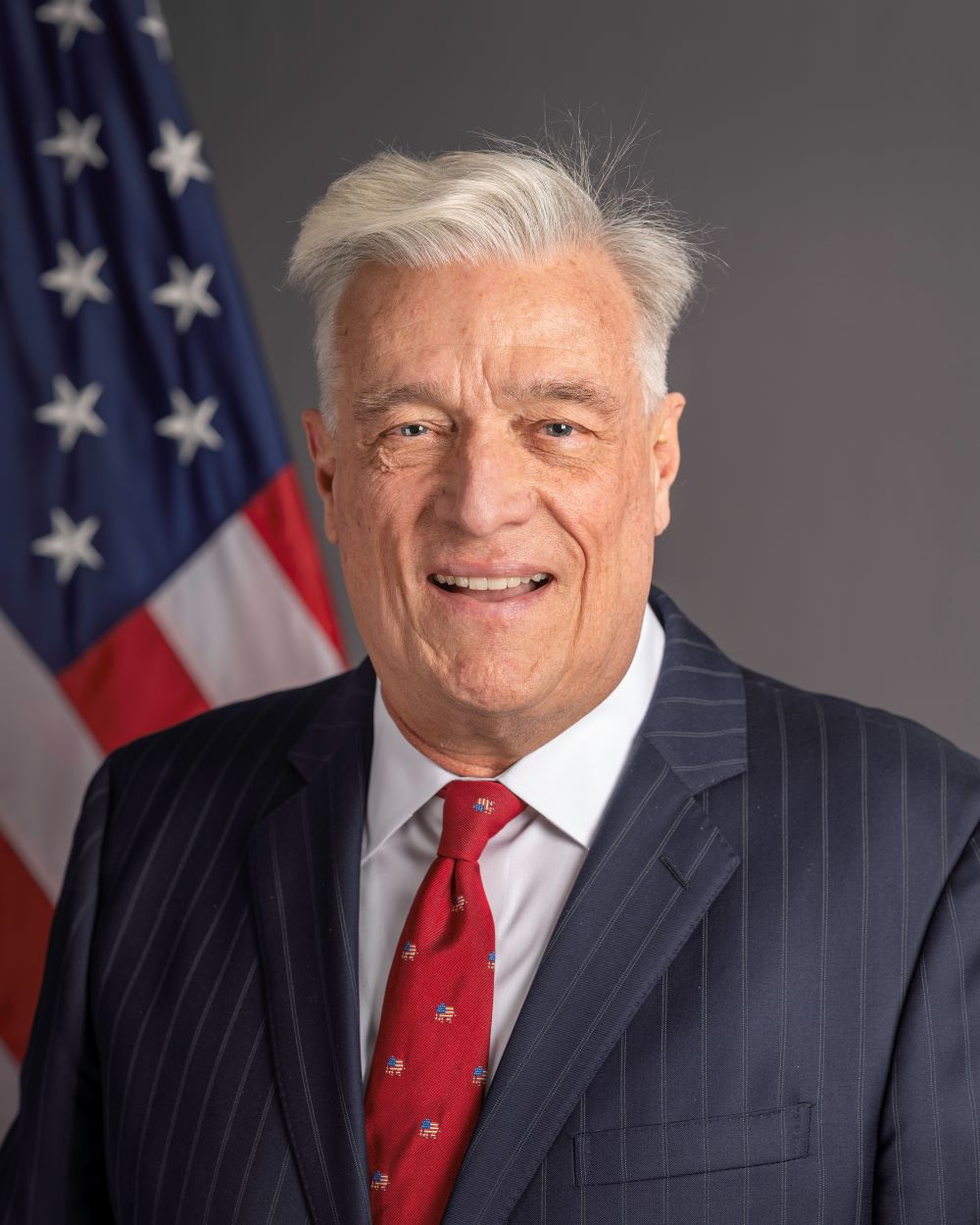
- Incumbent; José Cunningham since March 24, 2025
- Reports to: The under secretary of state for management
- Nominator: The president of the United States
- Inaugural holder: Julius C. Holmes
- Formation: 1945
- Website: Official Website

The assistant secretary of state for administration is the head of the Bureau of Administration in the United States Department of State. The assistant secretary of state for administration reports to the under secretary of state for management.

== List of assistant secretaries of state for administration, 1945—present ==
Name	Assumed office	Left office	President appointed by
Julius C. Holmes	January 29, 1945	August 17, 1945	Franklin D. Roosevelt
Frank McCarthy	September 1, 1945	October 11, 1945	Harry Truman
Donald S. Russell	September 24, 1945	January 20, 1947	Harry Truman
John Peurifoy	March 17, 1947	August 10, 1950	Harry Truman
Carlisle H. Humelsine	August 11, 1950	February 13, 1953	Harry Truman
Edward T. Wailes	May 29, 1953	June 22, 1954	Dwight D. Eisenhower
Isaac W. Carpenter, Jr.	June 23, 1954	January 25, 1955	Dwight D. Eisenhower
Loy W. Henderson	January 26, 1955	August 9, 1955	Dwight D. Eisenhower
Isaac W. Carpenter, Jr.	August 11, 1955	December 15, 1957	Dwight D. Eisenhower
Walter K. Scott	March 21, 1958	July 22, 1959	Dwight D. Eisenhower
Lane Dwinell	July 23, 1959	February 3, 1961	Dwight D. Eisenhower
William J. Crockett	February 23, 1961	June 7, 1963	John F. Kennedy
Dwight J. Porter	October 2, 1963	March 28, 1965	Lyndon B. Johnson
Francis G. Meyer	September 26, 1969	May 31, 1971	Richard Nixon
Joseph F. Donelan, Jr.	June 14, 1971	March 31, 1973	Richard Nixon
John M. Thomas	November 23, 1973	June 28, 1979	Richard Nixon
Thomas M. Tracy	September 25, 1979	August 30, 1983	Jimmy Carter
Robert E. Lamb	December 19, 1983	July 1, 1985	Ronald Reagan
Donald J. Bouchard	December 12, 1985	November 30, 1987	Ronald Reagan
Sheldon J. Krys	July 13, 1988	August 7, 1989	Ronald Reagan
Arthur W. Fort	August 9, 1989	January 8, 1993	George H. W. Bush
Patrick F. Kennedy	May 20, 1993	July 13, 2001	Bill Clinton
William A. Eaton	July 13, 2001	May 25, 2005	George W. Bush
Rajkumar Chellaraj	June 5, 2006	January 20, 2009	George W. Bush
Joyce Anne Barr	December 17, 2011	January 26, 2017	Barack Obama; Donald Trump
Harry Mahar (acting)	January 27, 2017	December 8, 2017	Donald Trump
Nicole R. Nason	December 8, 2017	March 11, 2019	Donald Trump
John W. Dinkelman (acting)	March 12, 2019	August 20, 2019	Donald Trump
Carrie Cabelka	August 20, 2019	January 20, 2021	Donald Trump
John W. Dinkelman (acting)	January 20, 2021	December 6, 2021	Joe Biden
Alaina B. Teplitz	December 6, 2021	January 20, 2025	Joe Biden
Mark Biedlingmaier (acting)	January 20, 2025	March 24, 2025	Donald Trump
José Cunningham	March 24, 2025	Incumbent	Donald Trump
