= Bureau of Diplomatic Security =

U.S. State Department security and law enforcement division

Agency overview
- Formed: 1916; 110 years ago
- Employees: 34,000
- Agency executive: Todd Wilcox, assistant secretary of state for diplomatic security
- Website: Official website

The Bureau of Diplomatic Security, commonly known as Diplomatic Security (DS), is the security branch of the United States Department of State. It conducts international investigations, threat analysis, cyber security, counterterrorism, and protection of people, property, and information. Its mission is to provide a safe and secure environment for officials to execute the foreign policy of the United States.

== Overview ==
The Bureau of Diplomatic Security (DS) is the political face and parent organization of the Diplomatic Security Service (DSS). The DSS consists of over 2,000 special agents who are responsible for protecting visiting foreign dignitaries and U.S. diplomatic missions abroad. The DSS is the primary conduit utilized by the Bureau of Diplomatic Security and the Department of State for security and law enforcement matters. Both acronyms (DS and DSS) are used interchangeably within the State Department and other agencies.

The assistant secretary of state for diplomatic security leads the Bureau of Diplomatic Security. Under the assistant secretary of state are several deputy assistant secretaries; the principal deputy assistant secretary is the director of the Diplomatic Security Service. The director of the DSS is the top-ranking, active special agent in the DSS and leads a force of special agents, diplomatic couriers, security engineering officers, and security technical specialists. Special agents are sometimes referred to as DS agents or DSS agents. Both terms are used interchangeably within the organization and other agencies.

For people who do not work for the Department of State (DoS), there is much confusion about the relationship between DS and DSS. Even within the Department of State, there is still some confusion regarding the difference between the two entities. The DSS is a law enforcement agency primarily made up of federal special agents, and the DSS acts as the operational division of the Bureau of Diplomatic Security.

Overseas, DS develops and implements security programs to safeguard all personnel who work in every U.S. diplomatic mission around the world and to protect classified information at these locations. The DS presence overseas is led at each post (embassy) by a DSS special agent who is referred to as a regional security officer (RSO), who serves as the senior law enforcement and security attaché. In the United States, DS protects the secretary of state, the U.S. ambassador to the United Nations, and foreign dignitaries and diplomats who visit the United States. DS has protected Yasser Arafat, the Dalai Lama, and Prince Charles. The agency develops and implements security programs to protect more than one hundred domestic State Department facilities as well as the residence of the secretary of state.

In addition to investigating crimes involving passport and visa fraud, DSS agents are engaged in other types of investigation. In cooperation with appropriate U.S. agencies such as the FBI and the CIA, DSS investigates the activities of foreign intelligence agencies directed against department employees. At the request of other law enforcement agencies, DSS assists in apprehending fugitives who have fled the United States. Personnel security background investigations are conducted on all employees, applicants, and contractors seeking employment with the Department. Intelligence investigations look into terrorist incidents and threats made against State Department employees and facilities throughout the world.

Since 1984, DS has administered the Rewards for Justice Program, which pays monetary rewards of up to $5 million, or in recent years even more, upon special authorization by the secretary of state, to individuals who provide information which substantially leads to the countering of terrorist attacks against United States persons. Through 2001, $62 million had been paid to over forty people in this effort.

== History ==
=== Bureau of Secret Intelligence ===
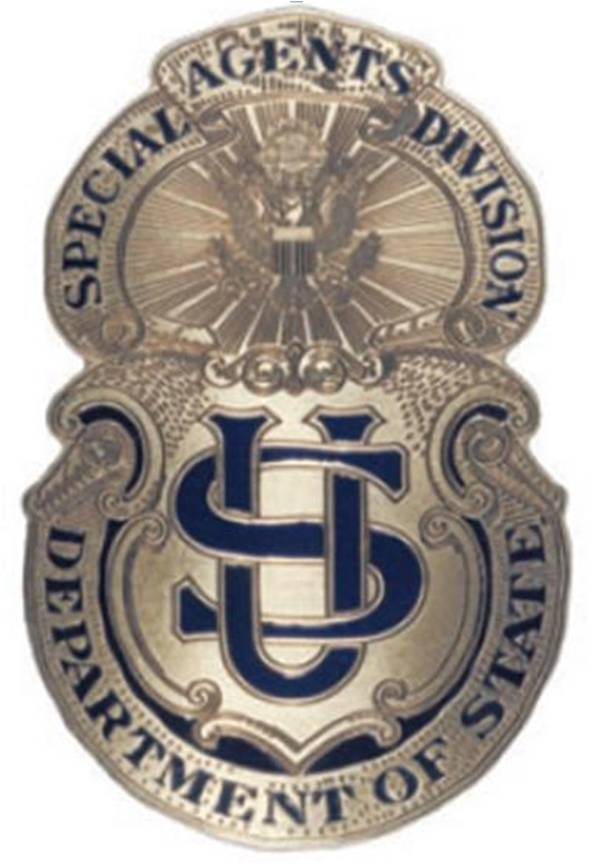
1916 Badge of the Bureau of Secret Intelligence, today's DSS

The Department of State's Diplomatic Security Service was formally established in 1916 under Secretary of State Robert Lansing. The office was headed by a chief special agent, who also carried the title of special assistant to the secretary and reported directly to the secretary on special matters.

A handful of agents worked out of two locations, Washington, D.C., and New York City, operating on confidential funds from the secretary's office. They conducted sensitive investigations, especially on the operations of foreign agents and their activities in the United States. The Diplomatic Security Service was known as the Bureau of Secret Intelligence at its inception in 1916. The Bureau of Secret Intelligence was also known as U-1, an off-the-books adjunct to the Division of Information. Before the United States entered World War I, German and Austrian spies were conducting operations in New York City. The spies were using forged or stolen identity papers. President Woodrow Wilson authorized the secretary of state to establish a security arm of the Department of State. Three agents were recruited from the United States Secret Service because of their experience with counterfeit documents. Since the U.S. Postal Inspection Service (USPIS) had the best laboratory, the director of the new agency was recruited there.

In 1918, the United States Congress passed legislation requiring passports for Americans traveling abroad and visas for aliens wishing to enter the United States. Shortly thereafter, the chief special agent's office began investigating passport and visa fraud. Special agents also protected distinguished visitors to the United States.

During World War I, the chief special agent's office was given the responsibility for interning and exchanging diplomatic officials of enemy powers and assisting in screening people repatriated from enemy-controlled areas.

The chief special agent began reporting his normal activities to the assistant secretary of state for administration. However, he still retained his title of special assistant to the secretary and reported directly to the secretary on sensitive matters.

With the help of the U.S. Postal Inspection Service (USPIS), security at State expanded and increased the depth of personnel investigations. The chief special agent's office was used not only for security work within the State Department but also in several aspects of immigration control and in the control of crime on the high seas.

In the 1930s, it became clear that there were major passport fraud activities worldwide involving both Communists and Nazis. The chief special agent's office, working as the investigative and identification arm of the Passport Office, successfully exposed several of these subversive operations.

=== Office of Security (SY) ===
With the coming of World War II in the minds of the political leaders of America, they decided it was time to develop a separate branch of the Bureau of Diplomatic Security. This new branch would be referred to as the Office of Security, or simply the SY. One major addition to the Bureau of Diplomatic Society stemming from the addition of the Office of Security was the development of security staffs on a regional level. The Office of Security was also responsible for starting the use of overseas agents carrying out various tasks to protect the security of the United States. As the threat of terrorist acts against America grew, the SY expanded its role as a part of the United States Department of State.

=== World War II ===
In a number of these cases, the passport aspect was incidental to a much larger problem—Soviet and German espionage networks. Investigation of passport fraud in New York City led to the discovery of a Soviet intelligence network that, in turn, revealed a number of Soviet agents and American Communist Party members engaged in espionage activities. Although a back-door approach, these investigations succeeded in exposing for the first time the existence of such Soviet operations.

With the outbreak of World War II, the office expanded again to manage interning and exchanging diplomatic officials of enemy powers and screening Americans, or those claiming American citizenship, after they were forced to leave occupied territories.

After the war, Secretary of State Edward Stettinius undertook a complete reorganization of the department that directly affected the chief special agent's office. The secretary requested the Federal Bureau of Investigation (FBI) review and make recommendations on physical and personnel security. One important result of that report was the separation of security functions in the Department.

A new security office was set up, separate from the chief special agent's office. This new Office of Security (SY) had a program of regional security staffs in the United States and, for the first time, security officers at missions overseas. Later, security functions were merged and, in 1948, Foreign Correlations (an intelligence service) was incorporated into the office, bringing in that aspect of security. Also in that year, the Marine Security Guard Program was inaugurated at U.S. embassies.

=== The Cold War ===
The discovery of a listening device in the Great Seal at the U.S. embassy in Moscow, known as the Thing, was the catalyst for developing countermeasures technology. By the end of the 1950s, hundreds of listening devices planted by foreign intelligence services were found in U.S. embassies. Also during this decade, a special assignments staff was created to investigate possible misconduct and contact with foreign intelligence services by State Department personnel. This staff worked closely with Central Intelligence Agency (CIA) and FBI Counterintelligence. Reacting to the crisis in electronic surveillance, SY upgraded its technical security program and began hiring engineers. The assignment of Seabee teams to search for listening devices at the U.S. embassies in Moscow and Warsaw led to the Seabee program within the Department.

SY assumed responsibility for the security of Department of State domestic facilities, which included information security, building passes, and the physical security of Department of State facilities.

Beginning in the late 1960s, several ambassadors and department officials were kidnapped or assassinated. These actions highlighted the possible exploitation of U.S. diplomats for political purposes. To meet this new threat, SY increased its protective capabilities.

The rages of terrorism continued, creating a new and increasingly dangerous threat to U.S. citizens and missions abroad, as well as to distinguished visitors to the United States. SY responded to the emerging threat by hiring over a hundred new agents and purchasing vehicles, radios, and other support equipment.

SY published handbooks on terrorism and provided advice for overseas personnel on traveling safely to and from work and how to make their homes safer. SY began to survey U.S. embassies for vulnerability to attack. Security officers received more intensive training and learned new skills, like defensive driving.

In 1961, according to at least one source, Otto Otepka, then the director of SY, brought to the attention of the United States Senate Internal Security Subcommittee deficiencies in the State Department clearance process. The allegations were traced all the way up to then-United States Secretary of State Dean Rusk. Despite multiple awards, appeals from multiple U.S. Senators, and despite having maintained his integrity by not backing down, Secretary Rusk removed Otepka from his position and ultimately fired him.

The counterintelligence division conducts aggressive counterintelligence inquires and counterespionage investigations with other U.S. Government agencies. All counterespionage investigations are conducted in close coordination with the FBI in accordance with their statutory mandate to prosecute instances or allegations of suspected espionage. The division conducts multiple counterintelligence and security awareness training programs for all U.S. Government personnel requesting or having access to sensitive Department of State facilities and information. All training programs enhance the understanding of both foreign intelligence and espionage threats and countermeasures, and educate employees on the foreign intelligence environment.

In addition, the office relies on a cadre of security engineers to deter, detect, and neutralize attempts by foreign intelligence services to technically penetrate Department of State office buildings and residences. These efforts range from detecting a simple listening device in the wall to countering the most sophisticated electronic eavesdropping devices and systems.

=== Bureau of Diplomatic Security and Diplomatic Security Service ===
The intensity of terrorist attacks against Americans increased. In the period between 1979 and 1983, there were over 300 attacks; in 1984 alone, there were over 100 attacks. In 1984, Secretary of State George Shultz formed an advisory panel to study make recommendations on minimizing the probability of terrorist attacks on U.S. citizens and facilities.

Headed by retired Admiral Bobby Inman, this commission was known as the Advisory Panel on Overseas Security, or the Inman Panel. The panel examined the department's security programs and, in a report published in June 1985, made its recommendations to the secretary.

On November 4, 1985, the Bureau of Diplomatic Security (DS) and the Diplomatic Security Service (DSS) were officially established. Today the Bureau of Diplomatic Security has approximately 34,000 employees, 1,800 of whom are the federal agents within the Diplomatic Security Service.

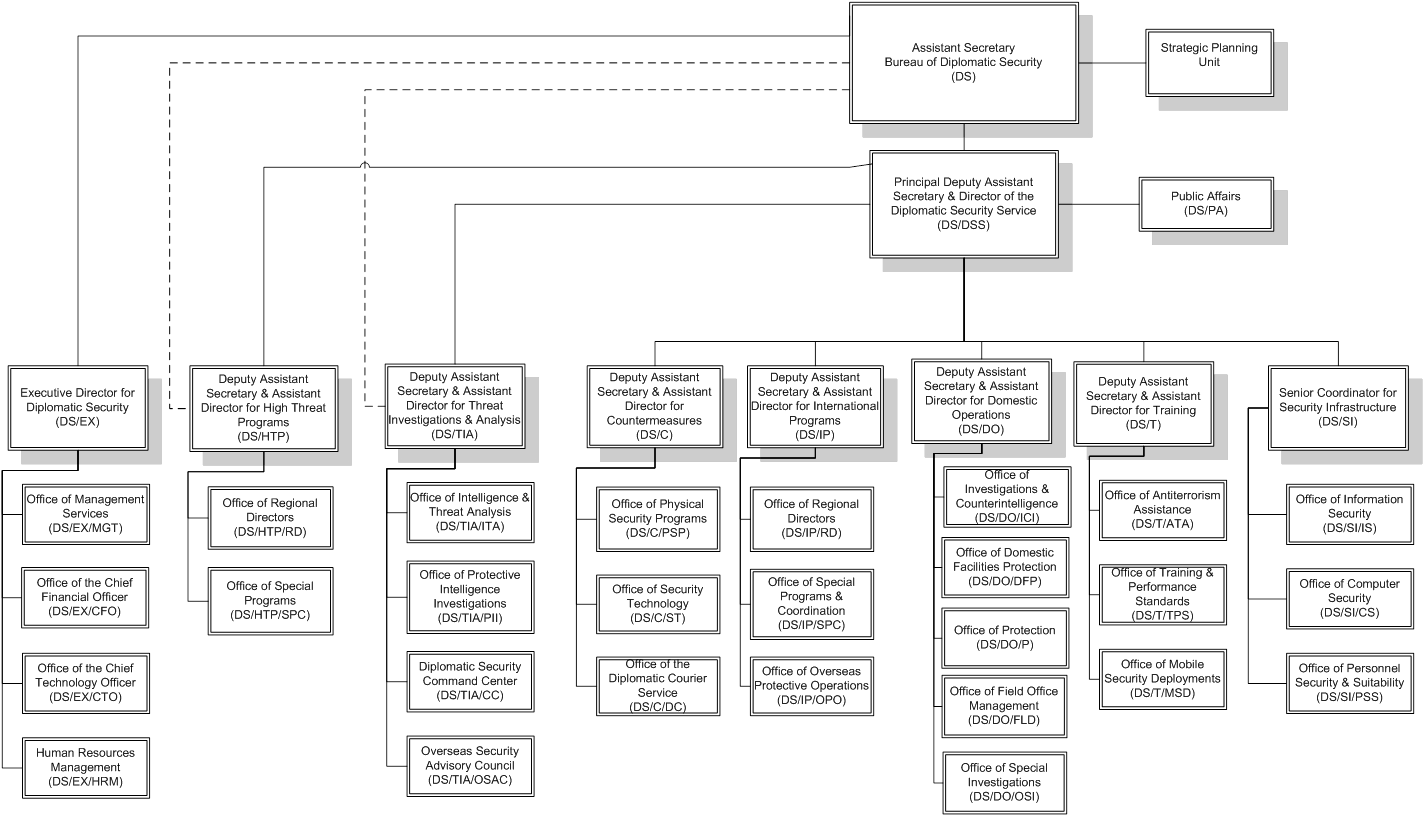
DS Organizational Chart

The Inman Panel's recommendations received strong support from Congress, and on August 27, 1986, President Ronald Reagan signed H.R. 4151, the Omnibus Diplomatic Security and Antiterrorism Act of 1986, which codified the recommendations of the Inman panel. The new Bureau had a clearly defined mandate outlined in legislation and structured along the lines of other Federal law enforcement, security, and intelligence agencies.

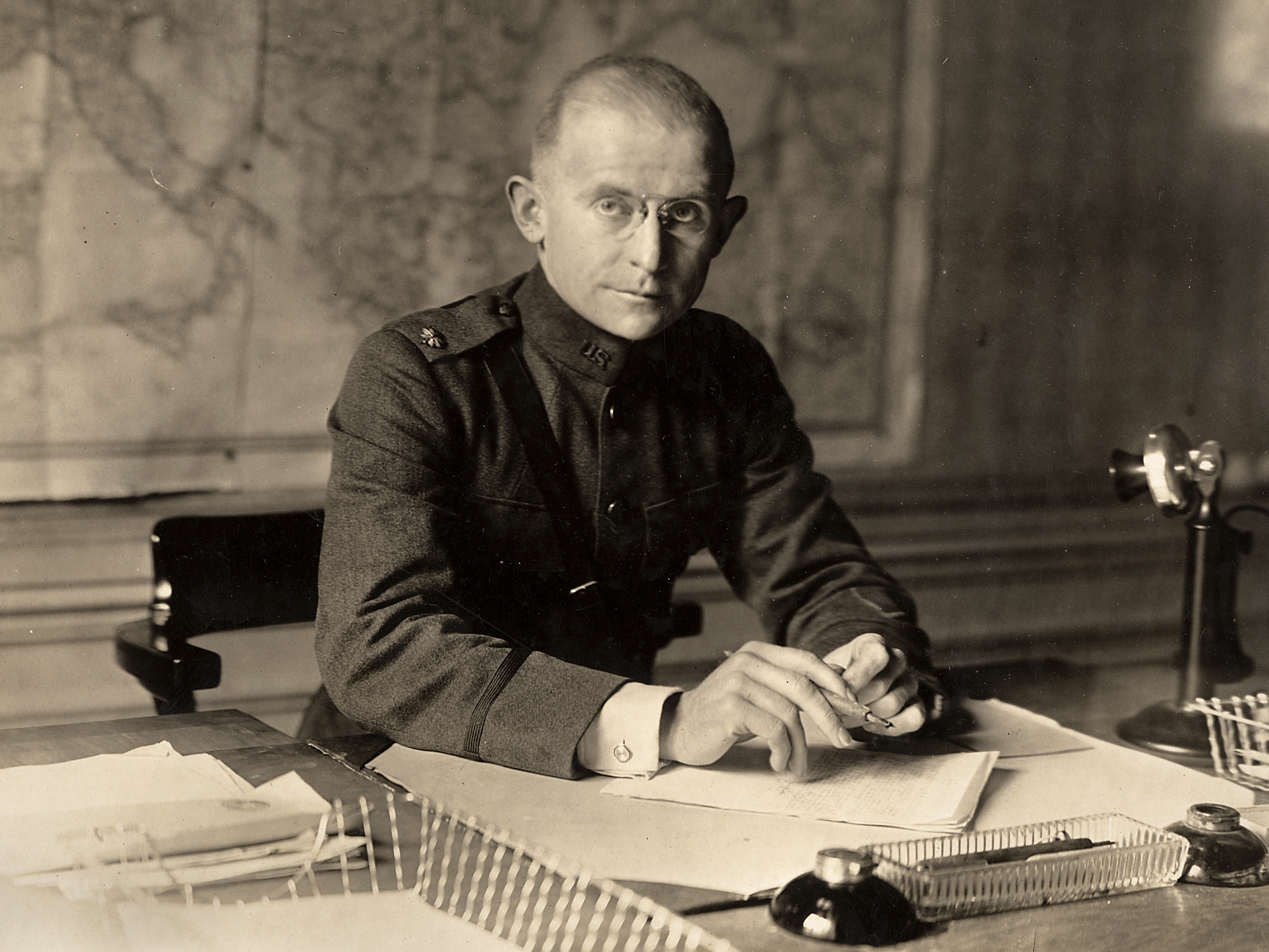
Major Amos J. Peaslee, founder of the United States Diplomatic Courier Service at his desk c. 1918

The Diplomatic Courier Service joined the new bureau at this time. Couriers no longer hand-carried pouches of communications but protected vast amounts of supplies, equipment, and construction materials bound for sensitive overseas posts.

By the end of the 1980s, DS began sharing information with the American business community operating abroad, through the Overseas Security Advisory Council, which itself expanded to include all members of the U.S. private sector, including non-governmental organizations, religious groups, academic organizations, and associations. Also, the Bureau expanded to provide state-of-the-art security to the department's communications and information systems.

The security improvements developed and implemented during the 1980s helped Americans withstand the heightened threat in the next decade.

The DS Rewards for Justice Program was initiated in 1992. Since then, more than $49 million has been paid for information that prevented or resolved acts of international terrorism against Americans. Information received through this program has resulted in the capture of several terrorists, including Ramzi Yousef, the mastermind of the 1993 World Trade Center bombing. Although the FBI received the credit, DSS agents actually found and arrested Yousef, the architect of the bombing. Special agents Bill Miller and Jeff Riner were given a tip by an associate of Ramzi Yousef about his location. They contacted local officials and arrested Yousef.

DS continues to conduct criminal and personnel security investigations critical to the protection of American borders and the national security of the United States. Special agents investigate more than 3,500 passport and visa fraud violations each year. DS receives about 3,000 requests for overseas investigative assistance from U.S. law enforcement agencies annually and has achieved notable success in locating and apprehending wanted fugitives who have fled the United States .

DS also provides protective services to distinguished dignitaries visiting the United States, as well as 24-hour protection to the secretary of state.

==== War on Terror ====
Following the August 7, 1998, terrorist bombings of the U.S. embassies in Dar es Salaam, Tanzania, and Nairobi, Kenya, the State Department declared the protection of American personnel and facilities overseas a top priority. Congress passed a $1.4 billion Emergency Embassy Security Supplemental (of which DS received about $588 million) enabling the Bureau of make significant improvements at every U.S. diplomatic mission overseas. Since the bombings, the State Department has spent billions of dollars to improve systems and facilities and increase security staffing to protect personnel and dependents around the world.

As overseas security requirements increased, so did the demands on the Diplomatic Courier Service. Couriers now transport more than 115,000 classified and sensitive materials overseas every year.

Security engineering officers (SEOs) continue to design and manage security equipment programs at posts worldwide, supporting the protection of U.S personnel and facilities abroad. They also help identify and mitigate the risks associated with technical espionage and the potential loss of sensitive information. This work requires ongoing attention as technology continues to evolve, particularly in areas such as detection equipment, computer systems, intrusion detection systems, and access control technologies.

While focused on improving security at U.S. missions abroad, several highly publicized incidents at the State Department firmly emphasized the need to strengthen domestic security as well. In addition to taking additional security measures at the State Department, the assistant secretary for DS convened a panel of security experts from the FBI, CIA, Department of Defense, U.S. Secret Service, and DS to review all domestic security policies, programs, and procedures. The panel made recommendations concerning access control, physical and technical security, security awareness for employees, restriction of traffic around the building, creation of a chemical/biological program, and additional resources for security. The majority of these recommendations were implemented. The department continues its efforts to enhance its domestic security program.

Since the September 11 attacks in 2001, DS has played an active role in the global war on terrorism. With more than 480 special agents assigned to diplomatic missions in 157 countries, DS is the most widely represented American security and law enforcement organization around the world.

The Antiterrorism Assistance Program, provides terrorism-focused police training to civilian security personnel from friendly governments. More than 31,000 students from 127 countries have received ATA training in the last twenty years. These students return to their countries better prepared to fight terrorism and protect Americans overseas during a crisis. In 2017, the U.S. Government Accountability Office (GAO) reported on weaknesses in Antiterrorism Assistance (ATA) program data and oversight of participants, including those trained in the United States.

== Investigations ==
DSS investigations, carried out by field offices and resident agent offices throughout the U.S., and by RSOs overseas, focus mainly on passport or visa fraud. DSS special agents also investigate such cases as international parental kidnapping, violations of the Protect Act, assaults on federally protected persons, fugitive arrests overseas (with host nation assistance), counterterrorism, and counterintelligence (CI) investigations. If there is a nexus to diplomatic activities, the U.S. Foreign Service, or terrorism, DSS is typically involved.

=== Passport and visa fraud ===
It is a felony to apply or assist someone in applying for a U.S. passport or visa when they are not entitled to one. Usually this means an alien in the United States trying to establish a false identity or stealing the identity from an American, often one who has died. Sometimes Americans, including Foreign Service officers (FSOs) are the target of DSS investigations, such as an FSO selling visas for personal gain. DSS also investigates other alleged improper or illegal behavior by Department of State personnel, to include incidents of espionage. Such cases would involve other agencies such as the Department of Justice. Overseas, DSS must take the role of local and state law enforcement when investigating issues such as spousal or child abuse by U.S. government personnel assigned to the embassy. This is because the host country will not investigate or prosecute diplomats, who are considered to have immunity from their laws. DSS also conducts tens of thousands of background investigations per year—not just for the Department of State, but also for other federal agencies.

In recent years, DSS has expanded its overseas investigations program with A/RSO–Is (Assistant Regional Security Officer–Investigators) also known as "overseas criminal investigators." These agents are given special training in consular functions, and are commissioned consular officers. However, they spend a large amount of their time working with the fraud units in consular sections, investigating visa and passport fraud, alien smuggling and human trafficking, although they have responsibilities outside of their respective consular assignments for mission security. They work closely with host country law enforcement agencies, and have recently been instrumental in dismantling several large alien smuggling rings. Where there exists an identifiable nexus to the United States, DSS coordinates their alien smuggling investigations with the resident or regional Immigration and Customs Enforcement (ICE) attache.

=== Counterintelligence ===
The Diplomatic Security Service Office of Investigations and Counterintelligence (DS/ICI/CI) conducts a counterintelligence program designed to deter, detect, and neutralize the efforts of foreign intelligence services targeting Department of State personnel, facilities, and diplomatic missions worldwide.

The office's counterintelligence division conducts aggressive counterintelligence inquires and counterespionage investigations with other U.S. Government agencies. Counterespionage investigations are conducted in close coordination with the FBI in accordance with their legal mandates.

The division conducts multiple counterintelligence and security awareness training programs for all U.S. Government personnel requesting or having access to sensitive Department of State facilities and information. All training programs enhance the understanding of both foreign intelligence and espionage threats and countermeasures, and educate employees on the foreign intelligence environment.

In addition, the office relies on a cadre of security engineers to deter, detect, and neutralize attempts by foreign intelligence services to technically penetrate U.S. office buildings and residences. These efforts range from detecting a simple listening device in the wall to countering the most sophisticated electronic eavesdropping devices and systems.

On June 4, 2009, the DSS and the FBI arrested former Department of State employee Walter Kendall Myers on charges of serving as an illegal agent of the Cuban government for nearly thirty years and conspiring to provide classified U.S. information to the Cuban government. Mr. Myers’s arrest was the culmination of a three-year joint DSS/FBI investigation.

=== Counterterrorism ===
The Diplomatic Security Service maintains agents in dozens of Joint Terrorism Task Force operations around the country. The Office of Protective Intelligence and Investigations in the Threat Intelligence and Analysis division has DSS special agents who travel all over the world investigating threats to the secretary of state and U.S. embassies and consulates. DSS special agents on the New York JTTF provided critical information in the immediate aftermath of 9/11 and DSS Agents assigned as Regional Security Officers around the world tracked down leads for the FBI and other federal agencies. Any time there is a threat or an attack against a U.S. embassy or consulate, DSS special agents are the first on the scene to investigate.

Robert A. Hartung, then assistant director of Diplomatic Security's Threat Investigations and Analysis Directorate, announced on September 2, 2010 that the U.S. Department of State’s Rewards for Justice (RFJ) program was offering rewards of up to $5 million each for information that leads law enforcement or security forces to Hakimullah Mehsud and Wali ur Rehman.

=== Other investigations ===
The Diplomatic Security Service investigates crimes against State Department personnel and other U.S. government personnel and families assigned under Chief of Mission authority at a U.S. embassy or consulate abroad. DSS special agents have investigated thefts, assaults, rapes, and murders, among other charges, around the world. Unlike investigations conducted in the United States by other federal agencies, DSS Agents have to work jointly with their foreign counterparts in often hostile areas of the world.

On January 28, 2009, a news story broke about a CIA station chief in Algiers, Algeria who was under investigation by the DSS for having allegedly raped two Muslim women.

==== Fugitives ====
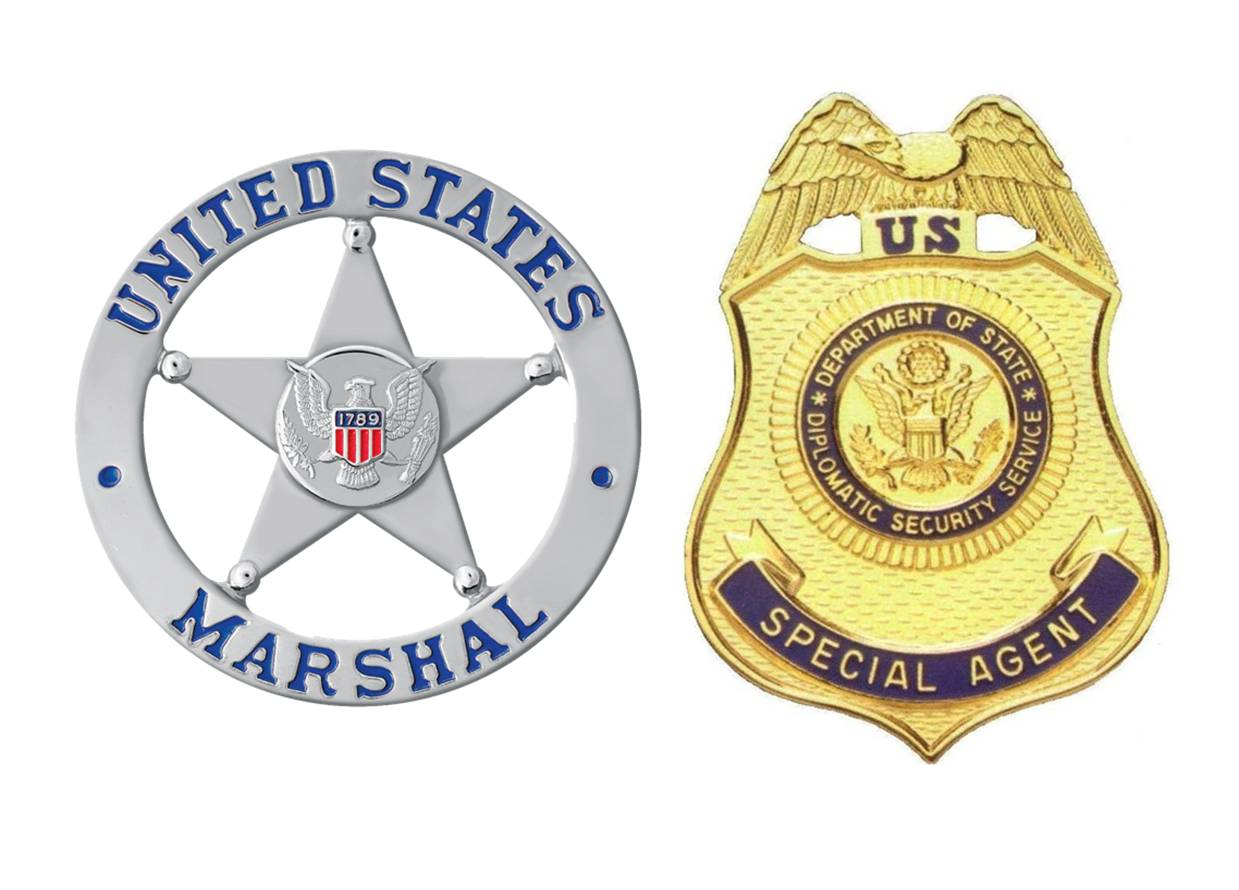
USMS and DSS team

Because the U.S. Diplomatic Security Service is one of the most widely represented law enforcement organizations in the world, its capability to track and capture fugitives who have fled U.S. jurisdiction to avoid prosecution is often considered unmatched. During 2009, DSS assisted in the resolution of 136 international fugitive cases from around the globe.

In 1995, DSS special agents Jeff Riner and Bill Miller, the RSOs assigned to the U.S. embassy in Pakistan, were present with Pakistani police and Inter-Services Intelligence (ISI) when they arrested Ahmed Ramzi Yousef, who was wanted in connection with the 1993 World Trade Center bombing in New York City. Despite FBI press releases, it was not the FBI who captured Yousef but the ISI and DSS.

DSS special agents located and returned Jared Ravin Yaffe from Brazil. Yaffe, wanted in California for multiple counts of alleged child sexual assault, kidnapping, and unlawful flight to avoid prosecution, was returned to the United States on May 12, 2009, to face trial. On February 11, 2009, the United States District Court, Southern District of California issued a federal arrest warrant for Yaffe for unlawful flight to avoid prosecution. Yaffe was profiled on the television show America's Most Wanted on April 11, 2009.

On September 19, 2009, special agents from the DSS located Derrick Yancey, a former deputy sheriff from DeKalb County Georgia, in Punta Gorda, Belize. Yancey was wanted in Georgia for double murder of his wife Linda Yancey and a day laborer. Upon arrival at a local bar, at 6:05 PM local time, a DSS agent tapped on Yancey's shoulder and told him "It is time to go." Belize authorities then arrested Yancey. Yancey was featured on America's Most Wanted.

On November 23, 2009, DSS special agents from the U.S. embassy’s Regional Security Office (RSO) worked closely with the U.S. Marshals Service, Guatemalan National Police, and INTERPOL to locate alleged murder suspect 24-year-old Ariel Beau Patrick, who was taken into custody in Guatemala. Ariel Patrick was featured on America's Most Wanted.

America's Most Wanted featured the capture of Robert Snyder in Belize—DSS special agent (RSO) Rob Kelty was interviewed by John Walsh (segment aired on February 27, 2010).

On April 26, 2010, after failing to check in with pretrial services within two days of his April 21 hearing on his bond status, Andrew Warren, 42, was apprehended by a combined team of Norfolk Police Department Fugitive Investigators, DSS special agents and U.S. Marshals. Judge Ellen S. Huvelle of the U.S. District Court for the District of Columbia issued a bench warrant for the arrest of the former CIA officer.

On July 30, 2010, special agents from the DSS located fugitive George Alvin Viste in Peru. Viste is wanted in Clark County, Washington on seven different criminal charges including the rape of a child, child molestation, and incest. "Diplomatic Security’s Regional Security Office in Lima worked closely with the U.S. Marshals Service and our law enforcement counterparts in Peru to locate Viste,” said Jeffrey W. Culver, director of the Diplomatic Security Service.

On October 8, 2010, special agents from the U.S. Department of State's Diplomatic Security Service (DSS) located Dario Sarimiento Tomas in Pampanga, Philippines. DSS worked with Philippine officials to apprehend Tomas, who is wanted in South Korea on charges that he defrauded an individual there of more than $200,000. Tomas was arrested by law enforcement officials from the Philippine National Bureau of Investigations and National Police. Tomas was assigned to the U.S. embassy in Seoul as a Customs and Border Protection Officer.

On January 12, 2011, special agents from the U.S. Department of State's Diplomatic Security Service (DSS) located and helped return California fugitive John Pope from Mexico. Pope, formerly of San Francisco, was taken into custody by Mexican authorities in La Paz, Mexico on January 12 and returned to the United States on January 18, 2011 to face trial. John Pope had been wanted by the San Francisco District Attorney's Office since October 20, 1998, in connection with allegations of fraud concerning embezzlement of $1,000,000 from the estate of a deceased San Francisco businessman.

February 3, 2011—Paul Eischeid, a fugitive, and member of the Hells Angels who had eluded U.S. Marshals for nearly eight years—is finally in handcuffs. U.S. Marshals tell AMW that the accused murderer was taken down in Buenos Aires on Feb. 3, 2011. Authorities say an Interpol Red Notice, as well as investigations by the U.S. Marshals Service and the U.S. Diplomatic Security Service in Argentina led to the elusive fugitive's capture.

Budget

The fiscal 2019 budget plan saw an 11% cut to overall diplomatic security in fiscal year 2020, with 18% specifically cut from embassy security, construction, and maintenance.

== Assistant secretaries of state for diplomatic security ==
The head of the Bureau of Diplomatic Security (DS) is the assistant secretary of state for diplomatic security. Assistant secretaries within the State Department are allowed to use the title of ambassador. For the heads of the DS predecessor (SY) see the Diplomatic Security Service (DSS) page.

- Robert E. Lamb (1985–1989), Foreign Service officer, was assistant secretary of state for administration and security from 1983 until 1987, and then became the assistant secretary of state for diplomatic security when the position was formally established
- Sheldon Krys (1989–1991), Foreign Service officer, was also concurrently the assistant secretary for administration and information management
- Anthony Cecil Eden Quainton (1992–1995), Foreign Service officer, attempted to transfer the bureau over to the Department of Justice
- Eric J. Boswell (1996–1998), Foreign Service officer, was first the director of the Office of Foreign Missions, then brought on to concurrently be the assistant secretary of state for diplomatic security
- David Carpenter (1998–2002), a former Secret Service agent, was the first assistant secretary with law enforcement credentials
- Francis X. Taylor (2002–2005), brigadier general and former head of the Air Force's Office of Special Investigations
- Richard J. Griffin (2005–2007), a former Secret Service agent and former inspector general of the Veteran's Administration
- Gregory B. Starr (2007–2008), acting assistant secretary, a Diplomatic Security special agent and director of the Diplomatic Security Service
- Eric J. Boswell (2008–2012), Foreign Service officer, was reappointed July 7, 2008, resigned December 19, 2012
- Gregory B. Starr (2013–2017), acting assistant secretary of state for diplomatic security and director of the Diplomatic Security Service; Starr was reappointed February 1, 2013 as the DSS director and on July 31, 2013, President Obama announced that he was formally nominating Mr. Starr to be assistant secretary of state for diplomatic security
- Michael Evanoff (2017–July 2020), sworn in on November 3, 2017
- Todd J. Brown (July 2020–August 2021), acting assistant secretary of state for diplomatic security
- Gentry O. Smith (August 12, 2021 – January 20, 2025), a former DS special agent who previously served as director of the State Department's Office of Foreign Missions, where he held the rank of ambassador
- Carlos Matus (January 2025–May 2025)
- Paul R. Houston (June 2025–October 2025)
- Todd Wilcox (October 2025–present)

== Overseas Security Advisory Council ==
The Overseas Security Advisory Council (OSAC), an office within the Bureau of Diplomatic Security's Directorate of Threat Investigations and Analysis (DS/TIA), was created in 1985 under the Federal Advisory Committee Act to promote security cooperation between American private sector interests worldwide and the U.S. Department of State. It started as a way for major U.S. corporations to receive pertinent security information direct from the government, but has since expanded to include much smaller organizations. Today, over 4,500 U.S. companies, educational institutions, faith-based institutions, and non-governmental organizations are OSAC constituents. Any private-sector organization incorporated in the United States is eligible to join, and constituency is offered free of charge.

OSAC, through its staff of foreign service, civil service, and government contract professionals in the Research and Information Support Center (RISC), provides a forum for sharing best practices, provides the tools needed to cope with security-related challenges and issues abroad, and provides analytical reporting on trends, incidents, and events affecting the private sector, including public annual Crime & Safety Reports with information for private-sector security managers to use when making decisions affecting their organizations. OSAC's reports also include ratings for every location where the United States has a diplomatic facility. However, these are Department of State ratings that speak to the threat against official U.S. Government interests in specific cities; they are not created by OSAC, and are neither countrywide threat ratings nor ratings evaluating the threat to private U.S. travelers.

Private-sector member organizations are selected from its constituency to serve for two to six-year terms on the OSAC Council. Representatives of the member organizations meet quarterly to tackle specific projects, such as the protection of business information and mitigating the effects from transnational crime. The OSAC Council is chaired by the director of the Diplomatic Security Service and co-chaired by a selected representative of the private sector; currently, the private-sector co-chair represents the Raytheon Company.

OSAC maintains a public website at www.osac.gov. The office was established under authority of the secretary of state pursuant to 22 U.S.C. § 2656 and in accordance with the Federal Advisory Committee Act (FACA), as amended, 5 U.S.C. App., and its regulations, 41 C.F.R. Part 102-3.

According to 2017 reports, at least the following countries have a critical security rating: Argentina, El Salvador, Guatemala, Honduras, Nicaragua and Peru, high security rating include Albania, medium security reports includes Bolivia among others and 2017 low security report rating includes Canada, Montenegro and Spain among others.

== Personnel ==
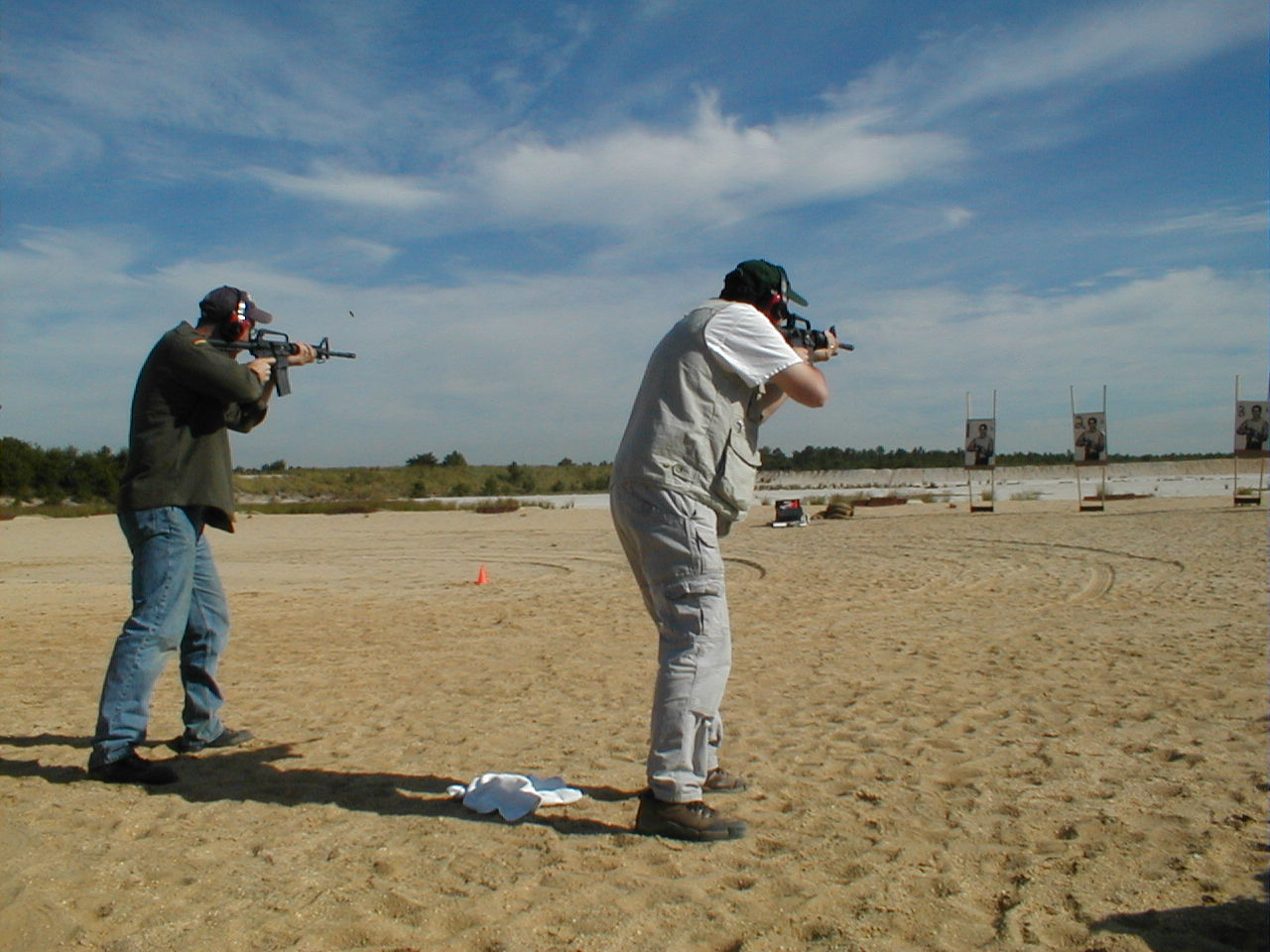
DSS special agents with the Colt M4 at range

Special agents of the U.S. Diplomatic Security Service (DSS) are sworn federal law enforcement agents who are responsible for the security of Foreign Service personnel, property and sensitive information throughout the world. Although the DSS is an organization within the Bureau of Diplomatic Security, it is the primary conduit utilized by the bureau for law enforcement and security matters. DSS special agents are responsible for the protection of the secretary of state, certain foreign dignitaries during their visits to the U.S., and others as designated by the secretary of state. Major activities include protective services, management of security programs for Foreign Service posts, criminal investigations, and background investigations, in addition to administrative, training, and liaison functions.

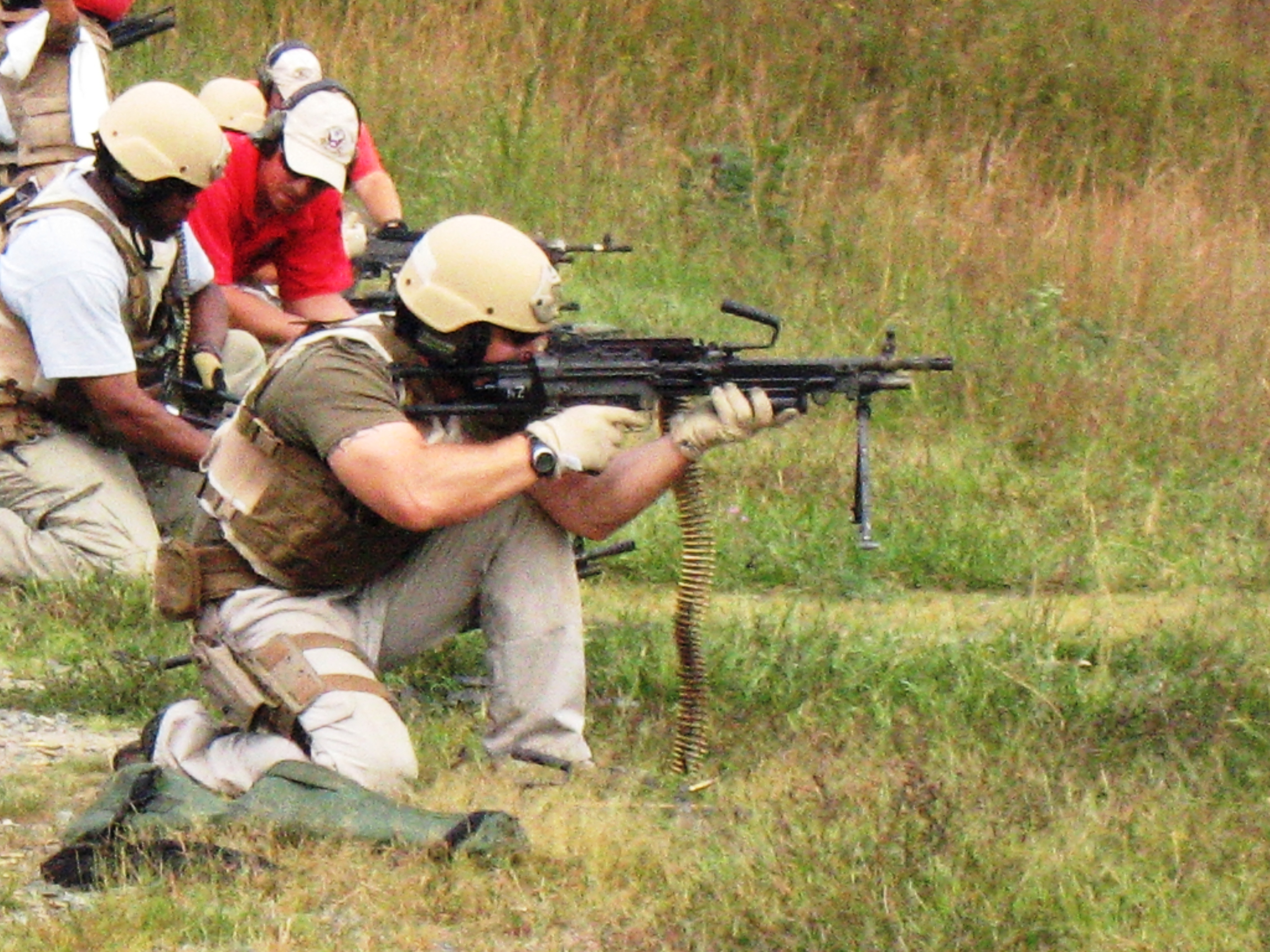
U.S. Diplomatic Security Service on the range with M249 SAW

Security engineering officers (SEOs) are responsible for managing the department's technical and information security programs, projects, and resources throughout the world. SEOs protect personnel, facilities, and sensitive information against espionage, terrorism, and crime. These engineers develop, maintain, and install electrical and mechanical systems such as access and perimeter controls, closed-circuit television, alarms, locks, and x-ray and bomb detection equipment. Engineers plan and conduct technical surveillance inspections to detect and nullify clandestine intrusions. They test new technical equipment and develop new techniques, strategies, and procedures for finding hidden intelligence-gathering devices. SEOs continually are challenged to identify security risks, analyze those risks, and develop systems to ensure the integrity of Department of State computers and worldwide network information systems. U.S. Navy Seabees and a cadre of specially trained security technical specialists (STSs) assist SEOs with the maintenance and repair of our security systems. Domestically SEOs manage, plan, and provide engineering support to worldwide technical security programs and to the secretary of state and visiting dignitaries. Overseas SEOs manage Engineering Service Centers (ESC) and Engineering Service Offices (ESO), which provide technical security to one or multiple posts under the management of regional security officers (RSO).

Security technical specialists (STSs) are support personnel within the Bureau of Diplomatic Security who assist in worldwide technical security programs. These programs provide protection for Department of State facilities and personnel from technical espionage, acts of terrorism, and crime. In this protection effort, sophisticated electronic and electromechanical security systems are used throughout the world, which include: intrusion detection systems, closed-circuit television systems, vehicular and pedestrian access control systems, metal detectors, and explosive detection systems. STS personnel support technical security domestically and abroad.

Diplomatic couriers protect information by ensuring the secure movement of classified U.S. government material across international borders to over 180 Foreign Service missions. Diplomatic pouches can contain thousands of pounds of equipment and construction materials, as well as classified documents bound for sensitive posts. Additionally, diplomatic courier control officers escort sensitive, but unclassified, crated materials within the United States and across international boundaries. These materials receive the same secure shipment as diplomatic pouches but, unlike diplomatic pouches, are declared to customs on entry into a country. The Diplomatic Courier Service securely delivered over 9.5 million pounds of classified material and 1 million pounds of controlled material last year. The Diplomatic Courier Service is constantly evolving to meet the increasingly restrictive guidelines imposed by various countries.

== Note ==
- With the exception of GS employees of DS serving domestically, most DS personnel are members of the United States Foreign Service, serving as specialists.

== See also ==
- U.S. Diplomatic Security's Mobile Security Deployments (MSD)
- List of United States federal law enforcement agencies
- Bureau of Diplomatic Security Bibliography
