= Patrick F. Kennedy =

American diplomat (born 1949)

Patrick Kennedy
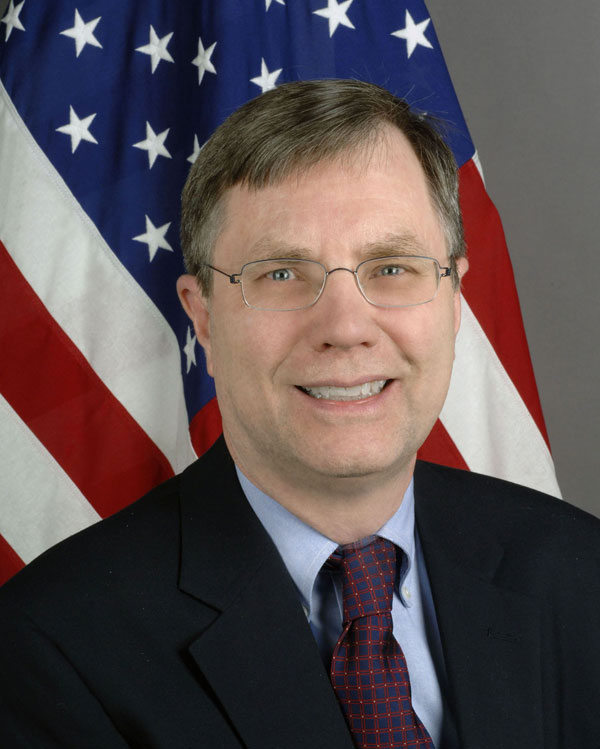

Under Secretary of State for Management
- In office November 15, 2007 – January 26, 2017
- President: George W. Bush; Barack Obama; Donald Trump
- Preceded by: Henrietta Fore
- Succeeded by: Brian Bulatao
- In office September 1, 1996 – August 20, 1997; Acting
- President: Bill Clinton
- Preceded by: Richard Moose
- Succeeded by: Bonnie Cohen

United States Ambassador to the United Nations for Management and Reform
- In office September 2001 – May 2005
- President: George W. Bush
- Preceded by: Donald Hayes
- Succeeded by: Mark Wallace

Assistant Secretary of State for Diplomatic Security Acting
- In office January 31, 1998 – August 11, 1998
- President: Bill Clinton
- Preceded by: Eric Boswell
- Succeeded by: David Carpenter

Assistant Secretary of State for Administration
- In office May 20, 1993 – July 13, 2001
- President: Bill Clinton; George W. Bush
- Preceded by: Arthur Fort
- Succeeded by: William Eaton

Personal details
- Born: Patrick Francis Kennedy; June 22, 1949 (age 77) Chicago, Illinois, U.S.
- Spouse: Mary Swope
- Education: Georgetown University (BS)

Patrick Francis Kennedy (born June 22, 1949) is a former career Foreign Service Officer who served as the U.S. State Department's Under Secretary of State for Management. He was Director of the Office of Management Policy, Rightsizing and Innovation. He has been Deputy Director for Management at the cabinet level Office of the Director of National Intelligence; he returned to the Department of State on May 7, 2007. Kennedy was U.S. Ambassador to the United Nations for Management and Reform and previously served as Chief of Staff for the Coalition Provisional Authority in Iraq. He was the Assistant Secretary of State for Administration for the Clinton Administration from 1993 to 2001. In 2014, Kennedy was elected as a fellow of the National Academy of Public Administration.

== Diplomatic career ==
Kennedy holds a B.S.F.S. degree from the Edmund A. Walsh School of Foreign Service at Georgetown University where he was a member of the Philodemic Society. After graduating, Kennedy joined the United States Foreign Service. Kennedy then served as a Personnel Officer at the Bureau of African Affairs, Special Assistant to the Under Secretary of State for Management, Supervisory General Services Officer at the Embassy of the United States in Paris, Executive Director and Deputy Executive Secretary of the United States Department of State, Administrate Counselor at the Embassy Of The United States in Cairo, Assistant Secretary of State for Administration, Acting Under Secretary of State for Management, Acting Assistant Secretary of State for Diplomatic Security, and U.S. Representative to the United Nations for Management and Reform.

Kennedy then served as Chief of Staff of the Coalition Provisional Authority and Multi-National Security Transition Command – Iraq. In the intelligence sector, Kennedy served as Deputy Director of National Intelligence for Management. Kennedy then returned to the State Department as the Under Secretary of State for Management, serving during three presidential administrations.

=== Blackwater investigation ===
In 2007, Patrick F. Kennedy chaired an investigation into the behavior of Blackwater Worldwide, following the Nisour Square shooting.

=== Election of 2008 ===
During the 2008 presidential election, Kennedy ordered that State Department employees in Europe be barred from attending Senator Barack Obama's speech in Berlin on July 24, 2008, to ensure they displayed political neutrality. Kennedy labeled Obama's visit as a partisan political activity.

=== Benghazi affair ===
Kennedy's role in diplomatic security decisions has come under scrutiny from politicians since the terrorist attacks on the U.S. Mission in Benghazi in 2012. Kennedy testified to the House Oversight Committee on October 10, 2012, about the death of Chris Stevens. He testified that, after the October 2011 fall of Gaddafi, the government of Libya was in flux, and that Stevens first arrived in Benghazi "during the height of the revolution", which occurred between February 17 and October 23, 2011, "when the city was the heart of the opposition to Colonel Qadhafi and the rebels there were fighting for their lives." At that time he was Special Representative to the National Transitional Council. Stevens returned to Libya as ambassador in June 2012, and was killed on September 11 of that year.

Ambassador Stevens understood that the State Department must operate in many places where the U.S. military cannot or does not, where there are no other boots on the ground, where there are serious threats to our security. And he understood that the new Libya was being born in Benghazi and that it was critical that the United States have an active presence there. That is why Ambassador Stevens stayed in Benghazi during those difficult days. And it's why he kept returning as the Libyan people began their difficult transition to democracy. He knew his mission was vital to U.S. interests and values, and was an investment that would pay off in a strong partnership with a free Libya.

The Republican minority on the Senate Select Committee on Intelligence alleged that Kennedy, as Under Secretary for Management, failed to approve requests for additional security in Benghazi and Tripoli, and failed to implement recommendations regarding high-risk diplomatic posts that had been issued after the bombings of embassies in 1998.

=== Investigation of the ambassador to Belgium ===
On June 10, 2013, CBS News reported that a memo from an official in the State Department inspector general's office alleged that the then-current ambassador to Belgium, Howard Gutman, was ditching his security detail to engage prostitutes and underage children, and further alleged that Patrick F. Kennedy had killed the original investigation in order to protect Ambassador Gutman and maybe others. On June 11, 2013, White House Press Secretary Jay Carney confirmed that the allegation regarding Kennedy was under active investigation by an independent inspector general. In October 2014, Gutman was cleared by the investigation and the State Department issued an apology for the allegations.

=== Hillary Clinton email investigation ===
On October 17, 2016, the FBI released interviews related to the Hillary Clinton email investigation. One of the interviews alleges that Patrick F. Kennedy "pressured" the Federal Bureau of Investigation (FBI) to declassify an email from Hillary Clinton's private server in exchange for a "quid pro quo" of placing more agents in certain countries. The FBI stated that the email's classification status was re-reviewed and remained unchanged and denied quid pro quo accusations. The State Department called the allegations "inaccurate" and maintained that Kennedy was trying to "understand" the FBI's classification process.

=== Resignation ===
On January 26, 2017, when Rex Tillerson, Donald Trump's nominee for United States Secretary of State, visited the United States State Department, Kennedy, Joyce Anne Barr, Michele Bond, and Gentry O. Smith were all simultaneously asked to resign from the department.

== See also ==
- Under Secretary of State for Management

Political offices
| Preceded by Arthur Fort | Assistant Secretary of State for Administration; 1993–2001 | Succeeded by William Eaton |
| Preceded by Richard Moose | Under Secretary of State for Management; Acting; 1996–1997 | Succeeded by Bonnie Cohen |
| Preceded by Eric Boswell | Assistant Secretary of State for Diplomatic Security; Acting; 1998 | Succeeded by David Carpenter |
| Preceded by Henrietta Fore | Under Secretary of State for Management; 2007–2017 | Succeeded by Brian Bulatao |
Diplomatic posts
| Preceded by Donald Hayes | United States Ambassador to the United Nations for Management and Reform; 2001–2005 | Succeeded by Mark Wallace |
