= David Carpenter (disambiguation) =

David Carpenter (born 1930) is an American serial killer.

David Carpenter may also refer to:

- David Carpenter (fl. 1820s), early Texas settler and namesake of Carpenters Bayou
- David Aaron Carpenter (born 1986), violist
- David Carpenter (cricketer) (1935–2022), English cricketer
- David Carpenter (historian) (born 1947), British historian
- David Carpenter (writer) (born 1941), Canadian novelist
- J. D. "David" Carpenter (born 1948), Canadian poet and novelist
- Dave Carpenter (1959–2008), American jazz bassist
- David G. Carpenter, U.S. Assistant Secretary of State
- David Carpenter (baseball, born 1985), baseball player
- David Carpenter (baseball, born 1987), baseball player
- David O. Carpenter (born 1937), professor of environmental health sciences

== See also ==
- Dave Carpender (1950–2007), American musician
