= Chris Isham =

Chris Isham may refer to:

- Christopher Isham (born 1944), theoretical physicist
- Chris Isham (journalist), American journalist
