= Anthony C. E. Quainton =

American diplomat (1934–2023)

Anthony Quainton
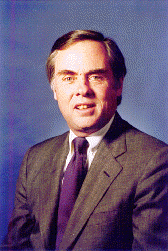

21st Director General of the Foreign Service
- In office December 29, 1995 – August 22, 1997
- President: Bill Clinton
- Preceded by: Genta Hawkins Holmes
- Succeeded by: Edward William Gnehm

3rd Assistant Secretary of State for Diplomatic Security
- In office September 23, 1992 – December 29, 1995
- President: George H. W. Bush
- Preceded by: Sheldon J. Krys
- Succeeded by: Eric J. Boswell

United States Ambassador to Peru
- In office December 11, 1989 – September 16, 1992
- President: George H. W. Bush
- Preceded by: Alexander Fletcher Watson
- Succeeded by: Charles H. Brayshaw

United States Ambassador to Kuwait
- In office 1984–1987
- President: Ronald Reagan
- Preceded by: Philip J. Griffin
- Succeeded by: W. Nathaniel Howell

United States Ambassador to Nicaragua
- In office March 26, 1982 – May 6, 1984
- President: Ronald Reagan
- Preceded by: Lawrence A. Pezzullo
- Succeeded by: Harry E. Bergold, Jr.

3rd Coordinator for Counterterrorism
- In office August 16, 1978 – August 1, 1981
- President: Jimmy Carter
- Preceded by: Heyward Isham
- Succeeded by: Robert M. Sayre

United States Ambassador to the Central African Empire
- In office February 4, 1976 – June 9, 1978
- President: Gerald Ford
- Preceded by: William N. Dale
- Succeeded by: Goodwin Cooke

Personal details
- Born: Anthony Cecil Eden Quainton; April 4, 1934 Seattle, Washington, U.S.
- Died: July 31, 2023 (aged 89) Washington D.C., U.S.
- Education: Princeton University (BA); University of Oxford (BLitt)

Anthony Cecil Eden Quainton (April 4, 1934 – July 31, 2023) was an American diplomat who served as the United States ambassador to the Central African Empire, Nicaragua, Kuwait, and Peru.

== Early life and education ==
He was born in Seattle and educated at St. Michaels University School in Victoria, Canada. He earned a Bachelor of Arts degree from Princeton University and a Bachelor of Literature from Oxford University, where he studied as a Marshall Scholar.

== Career ==
Quainton joined the United States Foreign Service in 1959. As a Foreign Service Officer, he was posted to Sydney 1959–1962, to Karachi 1963, to Rawalpindi 1964–1966, and to New Delhi 1966–1069. He spent 1969–1972 at the United States Department of State in Washington, D.C., as the senior political officer for India in the Bureau of Near East and South Asian Affairs. He then spent 1972–73 as a political officer at the U.S. Embassy, Paris. From 1973 through 1976, he was deputy chief of mission in Kathmandu. In 1976, President Gerald Ford nominated Quainton as United States ambassador to the Central African Empire. Ambassador Quainton presented his credentials on February 20, 1976, and held this post until June 9, 1978.

He then became the coordinator for Counterterrorism. During this time, he oversaw the task force in charge of dealing with the 1980 Dominican Republic Embassy siege in Bogotá by M-19 guerrillas. He held this post until 1981 and was then named United States ambassador to Nicaragua by President Ronald Reagan, presenting his credentials on March 26, 1982, and serving there until May 6, 1984. Reagan then appointed Quainton United States ambassador to Kuwait, a post which he held from September 1984 to August 1987. Quainton returned to the United States in September 1987, serving as Deputy inspector general of the Department of State from September 1987 to November 1989.

Newly-inaugurated President George H. W. Bush named Quainton United States ambassador to Peru. He presented his credentials on December 11, 1989, and served until September 16, 1992.

After his tenure in a Peru, Bush then nominated Quainton to be assistant secretary of state for diplomatic security, an office he held from September 23, 1992, until December 29, 1995. President Bill Clinton then named him director general of the Foreign Service which Quainton held from December 29, 1995, to August 22, 1997.

In 1997, Quainton left government service and joined the Una Chapman Cox Foundation. He then became president and CEO of the National Policy Association. Since 2003, he has been the Distinguished Diplomat-in-Residence at the American University School of International Service. He retired in 2019 but continued to teach his signatures courses on diplomatic practice and Peru until 2023.

== Personal life ==
While in England, he married a fellow Marshall Scholar, Susan Long, in 1957. He spent 1958–59 working as a research assistant at St Antony's College, Oxford.

Diplomatic posts
Preceded by William N. Dale	United States Ambassador to the Central African Empire; February 20, 1976 – July 9, 1978	Succeeded by Goodwin Cooke
Government offices
Preceded by Heyward Isham	Coordinator for Counterterrorism; August 16, 1978 – August 1, 1981	Succeeded by Robert M. Sayre
Diplomatic posts
Preceded by Lawrence A. Pezzullo	United States Ambassador to Nicaragua; March 26, 1982 – May 6, 1984	Succeeded by Harry E. Bergold Jr.
Preceded by Philip J. Griffin	United States Ambassador to Kuwait; September 1984 – August 1987	Succeeded by W. Nathaniel Howell
Preceded by Alexander Watson	United States Ambassador to Peru; December 11, 1989 – September 16, 1992	Succeeded by Charles H. Brayshaw
Government offices
Preceded by Sheldon J. Krys	Assistant Secretary of State for Diplomatic Security; September 23, 1992 – December 29, 1995	Succeeded by Eric J. Boswell
Preceded by Genta H. Holmes	Director General of the Foreign Service; December 29, 1995 – August 22, 1997	Succeeded by Edward Gnehm
