= Gregory B. Starr =

American diplomat (born 1953)

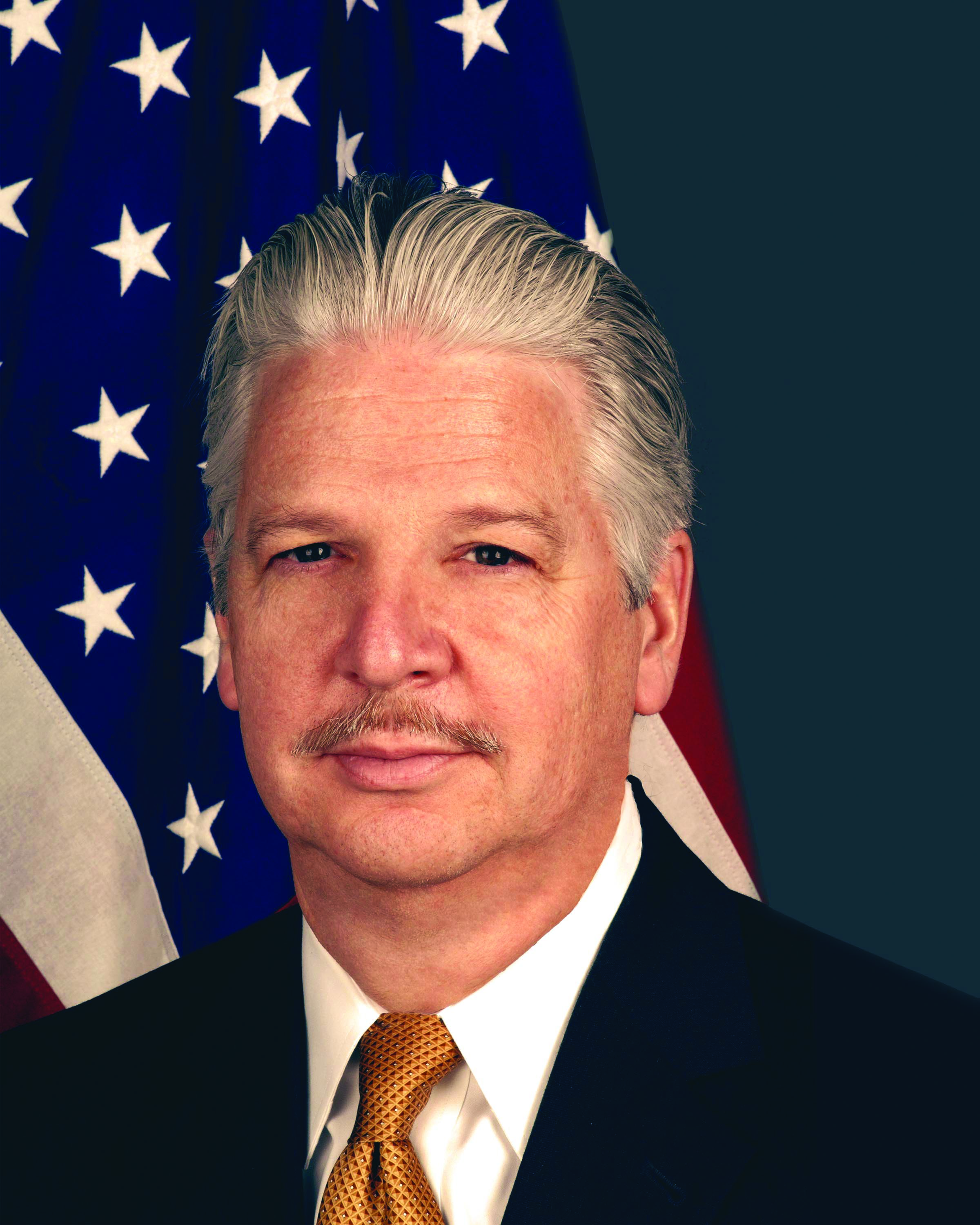

Assistant Secretary of State for Diplomatic Security
- In office November 18, 2013 – January 20, 2017; Acting: February 1, 2013 – November 18, 2013
- President: Barack Obama
- Deputy: Bill A. Miller
- Preceded by: Eric Boswell
- Succeeded by: Michael Evanoff
- In office November 1, 2007 – July 8, 2008 (Acting)
- President: George W. Bush
- Preceded by: Richard J. Griffin
- Succeeded by: Eric J. Boswell

Director of the Diplomatic Security Service
- In office February 1, 2013 – November 19, 2013 (Acting)
- President: Barack Obama
- Preceded by: Scott Bultrowicz
- Succeeded by: Bill Miller
- In office April 2007 – May 6, 2009
- President: George W Bush
- Preceded by: Joe D. Morto
- Succeeded by: Patrick D. Donovan (Acting)

United Nations Under-Secretary-General for Safety and Security
- In office May 6, 2009 – January 11, 2013
- Secretary-General: Ban Ki-moon
- Preceded by: David Veness
- Succeeded by: Kevin Kennedy (Acting)

Personal details
- Born: Gregory Bowne Starr; February 3, 1953 (age 73)
- Education: George Washington University

Gregory B. Starr (born February 3, 1953) is an American diplomat and the former Assistant Secretary of State for Diplomatic Security. He was previously the United Nations Under-Secretary-General for Safety and Security. He was selected by UN Secretary-General Ban Ki-moon on May 6, 2009.

Prior to his appointment with the United Nations, Starr was the Director of the U.S. Diplomatic Security Service (DSS), and the Principal Deputy Assistant Secretary within Bureau of Diplomatic Security (DS) from March 1, 2007. Starr also served as the acting Assistant Secretary of State for DS from October 2007 to July 2008. Starr became a Special Agent and joined the U.S. Foreign Service in 1980.

His overseas assignments include Senior Regional Security Officer (RSO) at the U.S. Embassy to Israel (1997–2000), and Regional Security Officer positions in Tunisia, Senegal and Zaire (now Democratic Republic of the Congo). His awards include several Senior Foreign Service Performance and Superior and Meritorious Honor Awards.

In January 2013 Secretary-General Ban Ki-moon announced the interim replacement for Mr. Starr. Mr. Starr's pending departure had been announced the previous August.

On February 1, 2013 it was announced that Mr. Starr has again assumed the responsibility of Director of the Diplomatic Security Service and will also serve as the acting Assistant Secretary of State for the Bureau of Diplomatic Security.

On July 31, 2013, President Obama announced that he was formally nominating Mr. Starr for Assistant Secretary of State for the Bureau of Diplomatic Security.

On November 27, 2018, several international media reported that a secret UN-report, chaired by Mr. Starr, about the killing of UN specialists Zaida Catalán and Michael Sharp in Congo march 2017, buried evidence suggesting that Congolese authorities may have been involved in the murder.

Diplomatic posts
Preceded by Joe D. Morton	Director of the Diplomatic Security Service; 2007–2009	Succeeded by Patrick D. Donovan; Acting
Preceded by David Veness	United Nations Undersecretary General for Safety and Security; 2009–2013	Succeeded by Kevin Kennedy; Acting
Preceded by Scott Bultrowicz	Director of the Diplomatic Security Service; Acting; 2013	Succeeded by Bill Miller
Political offices
Preceded by Richard J. Griffin	Assistant Secretary of State for Diplomatic Security; Acting; 2007–2008	Succeeded by Eric J. Boswell
Preceded by Eric J. Boswell	Assistant Secretary of State for Diplomatic Security; 2013–2017	Succeeded by Bill A. Miller; Acting
