= Nathaniel Howell =

Nathaniel Howell may refer to:

- Nathaniel W. Howell (1770–1851), U.S. Representative from New York
- W. Nathaniel Howell (born 1939), American diplomat and educator
