= Edward Gnehm =

American diplomat (born 1944)

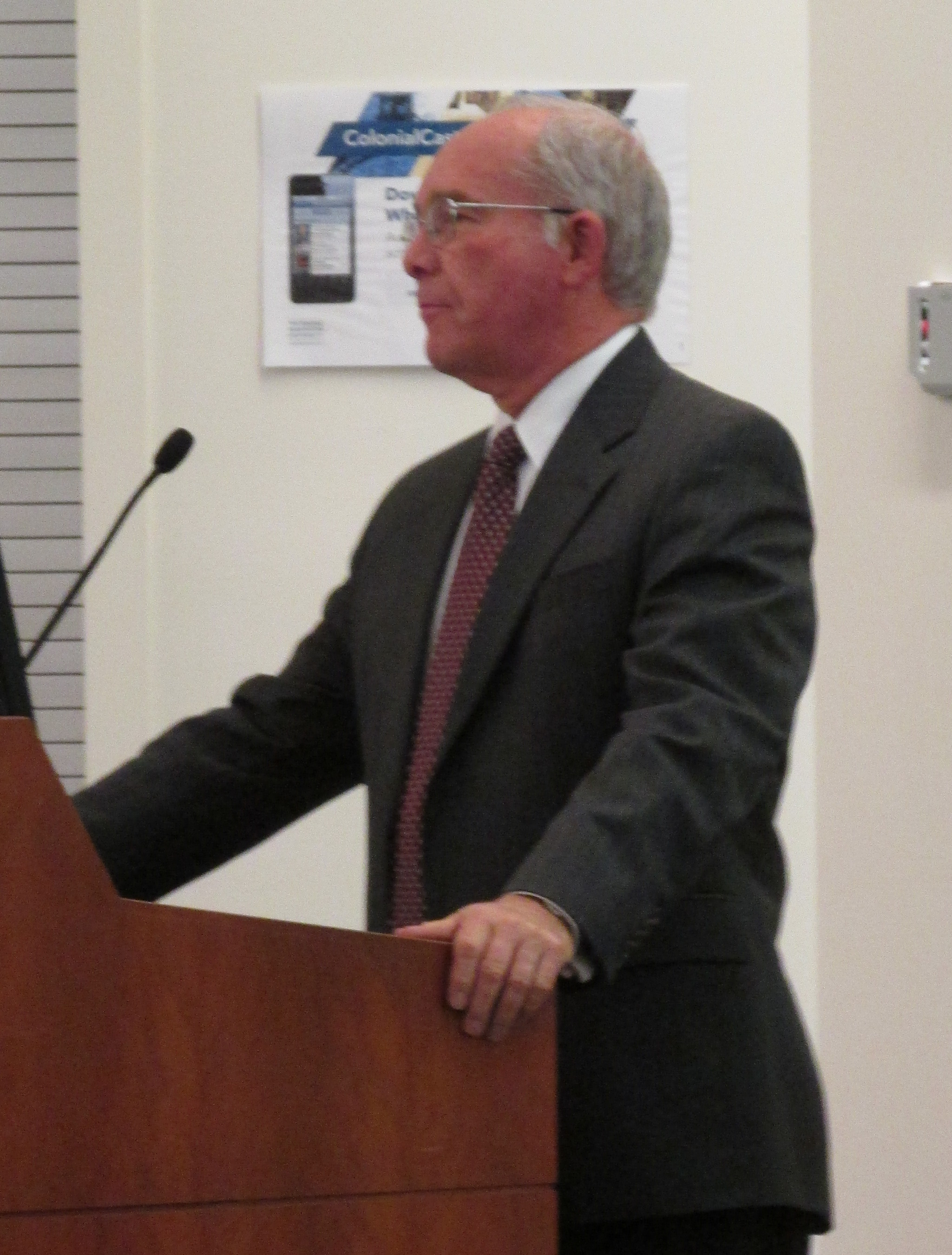
- Gnehm in 2013

United States Ambassador to Jordan
- In office August 7, 2001 – July 12, 2004
- President: George W. Bush
- Preceded by: William J. Burns
- Succeeded by: David M. Satterfield

21st United States Ambassador to Australia
- In office 2000–2001
- President: Bill Clinton
- Preceded by: Genta H. Holmes
- Succeeded by: Thomas Schieffer

United States Ambassador to Kuwait
- In office 1991–1994
- President: George H. W. Bush
- Preceded by: W. Nathaniel Howell
- Succeeded by: Ryan Crocker

22nd Director General of the Foreign Service
- In office August 25, 1997 – June 14, 2000
- Preceded by: Anthony Cecil Eden Quainton
- Succeeded by: Marc Isaiah Grossman

Personal details
- Born: November 10, 1944 (age 81) Carrollton, Georgia, U.S.
- Spouse: Margaret Scott
- Children: 2
- Education: George Washington University; American University in Cairo
- Profession: Diplomat, professor

Edward William Gnehm Jr. (born November 10, 1944), also known as Skip Gnehm, is an American diplomat who most recently served as the U.S. ambassador to Jordan. He was a faculty member at George Washington University's Elliott School of International Affairs.

== Education ==
Gnehm attended Albany High School and subsequently attended the George Washington University in Washington, D.C., where he earned a bachelor's degree in International Affairs in 1966. Gnehm completed his master's degree in 1968, and spent one year of his graduate studies at the American University in Cairo under a post-graduate Rotary International Fellowship. He is a member of the Sigma Chi fraternity and Delta Phi Epsilon foreign service fraternity

== Government service ==
Gnehm joined the U.S. Department of State in 1969 and has forged a long and distinguished diplomatic career in the U.S. Foreign Service. His positions included: Director General of the Foreign Service and Director of Personnel for the Department of State; Deputy Permanent Representative of the United States to the United Nations; Deputy Assistant Secretary of State, Bureau of Near East and South Asian Affairs; Deputy Assistant Secretary of Defense for Near East and South Asia; Deputy Chief of Mission, American Embassy, Amman, Jordan, and Embassy Sanaa, Yemen; head of the U.S. Liaison Office, Riyadh, Saudi Arabia; and Deputy Principal Officer, U.S. Interests Section, Damascus, Syria.

He was Ambassador to Kuwait from 1991 to 1994; Ambassador to Australia from 2000 to 2001; and Ambassador to Jordan from 2001 to 2004.

== George Washington University ==
Throughout his career, Gnehm has remained active at George Washington, having served both on the Board of Trustees, and as the vice president of the George Washington Alumni Association. Gnehm won the 2015 Harry Harding Teaching Award "for sustained excellence in teaching and extraordinary contributions to the education of Elliott School students." Continuing in the family tradition, Gnehm's son Edward attended George Washington University where he received his BA and an MBA.

== Awards ==
- 1990 – Presidential Meritorious Service Award for public service as Assistant Secretary of Defense
- 1991 – Presidential Meritorious Service Award for service as Deputy Assistant Secretary of State
- 1992 – Distinguished Alumni Achievement Award, The George Washington University
- Secretary of Defense Medal for Meritorious Civilian Service – awarded by Secretary of Defense Carlucci for service in the office of the Secretary of Defense
- Secretary of Defense Medal for Meritorious Civilian Service – awarded by Secretary of Defense Perry for support to U.S. forces during and after Desert Storm.

== Personal life ==
Gnehm is married to the former Margaret Scott of Macon, Georgia. They have two children, Cheryl and Edward III. He also has 5 grandchildren, Helyn, Edward IV, Ada, Petra, and James.

== Affiliations ==
- Member of the board of directors of the Arab Gulf States Institute in Washington

Diplomatic posts
Preceded by W. Nathaniel Howell	U.S. Ambassador to Kuwait; 1991–1994	Succeeded by Ryan Crocker
Preceded by Genta H. Holmes	U.S. Ambassador to Australia; 2000–2001	Succeeded by Tom Schieffer
Preceded by William J. Burns	U.S. Ambassador to Jordan; 2001–2004	Succeeded by David M. Satterfield
