= Bureau of Diplomatic Security bibliography =

This article is a bibliography of information for the Diplomatic Security Service, Bureau of Diplomatic Security.

- REWARDS FOR JUSTICE - DSS - Money for Information leading to the capture of Terrorists
- Pamphlet - DSS: A Global Law Enforcement Agency
- BBC article on DSS
- OFFICIAL U.S. Diplomatic Security Website
- U.S. Diplomatic Security Photo Gallery
- U.S. Diplomatic Security Pictorial History
- U.S. Diplomatic Security testifies before Senate's Homeland Security & Governmental Affairs Subcmte, SD-342
- U.S. Diplomatic Security's Assistant Secretary of State testifies before the Senate C-SPAN
- U.S. Diplomatic Security's Assistant Secretary of State testifies before the Senate on 6/29/2011 C-SPAN
- DS on C-SPAN
- Diplomatic Security Special Agents Association
- Diplomatic Security - Office of Foreign Missions
- Diplomatic Security WASHINGTON POST article
- Diplomatic Security - Mobile Security Deployments (MSD)
- "1996 Secretary of State Warren Christopher presents awards for valor to DSS Special Agents - Transcript". Vol. 7, no. 9.
- DS Special Agents at the Olympics
- CBS Evening News - DSS at the UN General Assembly 2009
- CBS Evening News - Diplomatic Security Behind the Scenes
- CBS NEWS 6 June 2011 - Keeping U.S. Officials Safe Overseas - DSS
- CBS Evening News 22 Sept 2011 - DSS: Inside Hillary Clinton's Security Bubble
- AMW - America's Most Wanted Interview of RSO Rob Kelty - Diplomatic Security Service - 11 min. 15 sec. into the segment. Segment aired on February 27, 2010 on AMW
- AMW - America's Most Wanted - Behind the Scenes: Belize - DSS Special Agent (RSO) Rob Kelty interviewed by John Walsh
- Former DS Special Agent tells Fox News that radical Muslim cleric lied to qualify for U.S.- funded college scholarship
- VISA SECURITY - Stratfor.com
- DSS Special Agent Randall Bennett investigates Wall Street Journal reporter Daniel Pearl's murder
- DSS Segments/Clips
- DSS and America's Most Wanted
- Diplomatic Security 2010 Year in Review - Vigilant In an Uncertain World
- PROVIDING FALSE INFORMATION ON PASSPORT APPLICATIONS LEADS TO FEDERAL PROSECUTIONS
- U.S. Diplomatic Security - 2010 Year in Review
- Defense Standard Magazine, Winter 2010 Pg 76, Diplomatic Security - ACTIVE DIPLOMACY
- Diplomatic Security Service Protecting U.S. Officials Overseas
- U.S. Investigates Syrian Diplomats for Spying on Protesters - State Department may limit their travel
- Female DSS Agents in ELLE Magazine
- Marine Museum honors partnership between Corps' Security Guard Program & the Diplomatic Security Service
- State Magazine, October 2011 - DS Keeps Watch in Northern Afghanistan
- ICE-HSI & DSS: Authorities Bust Strip Club Operation that Illegally Employed Hundreds
- U.S. Diplomatic Security in Iraq After the Withdrawal
- L.A. Times: Robert Downey, Jr. plays DSS Agent 1998
- L.A. Arsons: Federal agent tips helped lead to suspect's capture
- Harrisburg, Pennsylvania Couple Charged After Human Trafficking Investigation
- Personal Security Overseas: Bruce Tully, DSS Ret. (Part 1)
- Police Officers Drill on Protecting Diplomats in Abingdon, Virginia Under the Supervision of Special Agents of the Bureau of Diplomatic Security
- REWARDS FOR JUSTICE (RFJ) Robert Hartung of DS Testifies Before Congress
- DSS agents at Westboro service for Iraq bomb victim
- Retired ‘Phrogs’ USMC CH-46E leap back into service
- Inside the Secret NATO Command Center
- DSS at the NATO Multi-agency Communications Center - Chicago
- DSS Facebook
- Diplomatic Security Training Center (DSTC)
- High Threat Training Video

== See also ==
- Bureau of Diplomatic Security
- Diplomatic Security Service
