= Joyce Anne Barr =

American diplomat (born 1951)

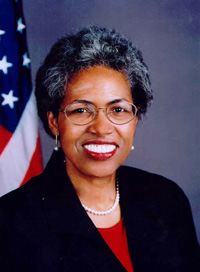

Assistant Secretary of State for Administration
- In office December 19, 2011 – January 26, 2017
- President: Barack Obama; Donald Trump
- Preceded by: Rajkumar Chellaraj
- Succeeded by: Nicole Nason

United States Ambassador to Namibia
- In office October 27, 2004 – July 31, 2007
- President: George W. Bush
- Preceded by: Kevin McGuire
- Succeeded by: Gail Mathieu

Personal details
- Born: 1951 (age 74–75) Tacoma, Washington
- Education: Pacific Lutheran University; Harvard University; National Defense University

Joyce Anne Barr (born 1951) is an American diplomat and a career foreign service officer in the Department of State. She served as an Assistant Secretary of State for Administration and Chief Freedom of Information Act Officer. Prior to that, Barr was the International Affairs Advisor at the Industrial College of the Armed Forces. Her previous assignment was as the executive director for East Asian and Pacific Affairs (EAP) within the State Department. She served as the ambassador to Namibia from 2004 to 2007.

== Early life ==
Barr was born in 1951, in Tacoma, Washington.

== Education ==
Barr received a B.A. in Business Administration from Pacific Lutheran University, graduating magna cum laude. She also received a M.P.A. from Harvard University and an M.S. in National Resource Strategy from the Industrial College of the Armed Forces.

== Career ==
Barr served as a career diplomat, having joined the Department of State in 1979. She has held assignments in Stockholm (1980), Budapest (1982), Nairobi (1985), Khartoum (1989), Ashgabat (1998), and Kuala Lumpur, where she was Counselor for Management Affairs.

Barr has also had domestic assignments in Washington, D.C, where she worked for the Department of State's Bureau of Personnel, Bureau of Human Rights and Humanitarian Affairs, and the Bureau of International Organizations in the UN Industrial Development Organization and the World Tourism Organization.

Barr was nominated as U.S. Ambassador to Namibia by President Bush and was confirmed by the U.S. Senate. Ambassador Barr began her appointment on October 4, 2004.

Barr has also participated in the Department of State Domestic Assignment Program, also known as the Pearson Program. This program was begun in the 1970s, where Foreign Service officers are assigned outside the department in order to develop their knowledge of foreign affairs legislation and of public concerns. As part of this assignment, she worked with Senator Daniel Patrick Moynihan and Congressman Bennie Thompson.

On December 17, 2011, the United States Senate confirmed Barr to be Assistant Secretary of State for Administration.

On January 26, 2017, when Rex Tillerson, Donald Trump's nominee for United States Secretary of State, visited the United States State Department, Barr, Patrick F. Kennedy, Michele Bond, and Gentry O. Smith were all simultaneously asked to resign from the department.

Barr is a Fellow of the National Academy of Public Administration.

Diplomatic posts
Preceded by Kevin McGuire	United States Ambassador to Namibia; 2004–2007	Succeeded by Gail Mathieu
Political offices
Preceded by Rajkumar Chellaraj	Assistant Secretary of State for Administration; 2011–2017	Succeeded by Harry Mahar; Acting
