= Heyward Isham =

American diplomat

2nd Coordinator for Counterterrorism
- In office October 26, 1977 – August 1, 1978
- President: Jimmy Carter
- Preceded by: L. Douglas Heck
- Succeeded by: Anthony C. E. Quainton

United States Ambassador to Haiti
- In office January 31, 1974 – July 8, 1977
- President: Gerald R. Ford; Jimmy Carter
- Preceded by: Clinton E. Knox
- Succeeded by: William Bowdoin Jones

Personal details
- Born: Henry Heyward Isham; November 4, 1926; New York City, New York, U.S.
- Died: June 18, 2009 (aged 82); Southampton, New York, U.S.
- Spouse: Sheila Eaton Isham
- Children: 3, including Chris Isham
- Education: Phillips Academy, Yale University

Henry Heyward Isham (November 4, 1926 – June 18, 2009), was an American diplomat, Foreign Service Officer and editor. He was the negotiator who played an important role in the talks with North Vietnam that led to the Peace accord of 1973.

== Biography ==
Heyward Isham was born in New York City on November 4, 1926. His father Ralph Heyward Isham, born in New York City, was a noted retired British Army officer and collector of rare books. His mother was Margaret Hurt Isham; his younger brother Jonathan was born in 1929; his parents divorced in 1934. He graduated from Phillips Academy.

Isham studied International Relations at Yale College, graduating in 1947 before being posted to the American Embassy in Berlin during the Cold War. From 1955 through 1957, he was chief of the consular section and political office at the United States Embassy in Moscow. From 1974 to 1977, after a posting in Hong Kong, Isham was the American ambassador to Haiti.

After his retirement from the diplomatic service he worked as an editor with Doubleday publishers. During this period he supervised the publication of the memoirs of Andrei A. Gromyko, the Soviet foreign minister from 1957 to 1985, and other books by Russians.

== Personal life ==
He was married to the artist Sheila (née Eaton) with whom he had three children. Son Christopher Isham was named Vice President and Washington Bureau Chief for CBS News in July 2007. Son Ralph Heyward Isham is the founder and managing director of GH Venture Partners LLC and is a former Fellow with the U.S. Senate Foreign Relations Committee during the SALT II treaty hearings, who served on the staffs of Congressman James W. Symington and Senator Edward Brooke, and is married to designer and artist Ala von Auersperg, daughter of Sunny von Bülow and co-founder of the National Center for Victims of Crime. Daughter Sandra Isham Vreeland was a poet and the director of an AIDS poetry project for youth; she died in 1996.

Diplomatic posts
Preceded by Clinton E. Knox	United States Ambassador to Haiti; 1973–1974	Succeeded by William B. Jones
