= Assistant Secretary of State for Diplomatic Security =

U.S. government position

United States Assistant Secretary of State for Diplomatic Security
- Seal of the Bureau of Diplomatic Security

- Flag of an assistant secretary of state

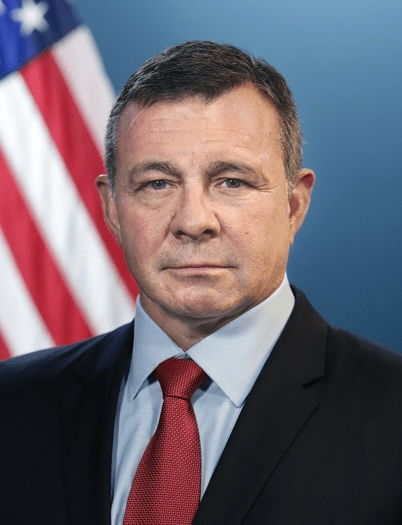
- Incumbent; Todd Wilcox since October 14, 2025
- Reports to: The under secretary of state for management
- Nominator: The president of the United States
- Inaugural holder: Robert E. Lamb
- Formation: 1987
- Website: Official website

The assistant secretary of state for diplomatic security is the head of the Bureau of Diplomatic Security in the United States Department of State. The assistant secretary of state for diplomatic security reports to the under secretary of state for management.

== Assistant secretaries of state for diplomatic security, 1987–present ==
#	Name	Assumed office	Left office	President appointed by
1	Robert E. Lamb	June 19, 1987	August 9, 1989	Ronald Reagan
2	Sheldon J. Krys	August 9, 1989	August 7, 1992	George H. W. Bush
3	Anthony C. E. Quainton	September 23, 1992	December 29, 1995	George H. W. Bush
4	Eric J. Boswell	January 5, 1996	January 31, 1998	Bill Clinton
-	Patrick F. Kennedy (acting)	January 31, 1998	August 11, 1998	Bill Clinton
5	David G. Carpenter	August 11, 1998	June 29, 2002	Bill Clinton
6	Francis X. Taylor	November 18, 2002	February 19, 2005	George W. Bush
7	Richard J. Griffin	June 22, 2005	November 1, 2007	George W. Bush
-	Gregory B. Starr (acting)	November 1, 2007	July 7, 2008	George W. Bush
8	Eric J. Boswell	July 7, 2008	December 19, 2012	George W. Bush, Barack Obama
-	Scott Bultrowicz (acting)	December 19, 2012	November 18, 2013	Barack Obama
9	Gregory B. Starr	November 18, 2013	January 20, 2017	Barack Obama
-	Bill Miller (interim)	January 21, 2017	June 27, 2017	N/A
-	Christian J. Schurman (acting)	June 27, 2017	November 3, 2017	N/A
10	Michael Evanoff	November 3, 2017	July 24, 2020	Donald Trump
-	Todd J. Brown (acting)	August 1, 2020	August 12, 2021	N/A
11	Gentry O. Smith	August 12, 2021	January 20, 2025	Joe Biden
-	Carlos Matus (acting)	January 20, 2025	May 30, 2025	Donald Trump
-	Paul R. Houston (acting)	June 2, 2025	October 14, 2025	N/A
12	Todd Wilcox	October 14, 2025	Present	Donald Trump
