= Gentry O. Smith =

American diplomat (born 1959)

Gentry Smith
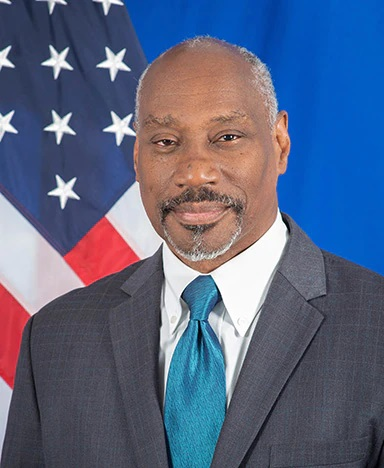

Assistant Secretary of State for Diplomatic Security
- In office August 12, 2021 – January 20, 2025
- President: Joe Biden
- Preceded by: Michael Evanoff
- Succeeded by: Todd Wilcox

Director of the Office of Foreign Missions
- In office June 19, 2015 – January 26, 2017
- President: Barack Obama
- Preceded by: Eric J. Boswell
- Succeeded by: Stephen Akard

Personal details
- Born: 1959 (age 66–67)
- Education: North Carolina State University (BA)

Gentry O. Smith (born 1959) is an American foreign service officer who had served as Assistant Secretary of State for Diplomatic Security. From June 2015 to January 2017, he was Director of the Office of Foreign Missions.

== Early life and education ==
Smith was born to two school teachers in Halifax County, North Carolina. He attended Weldon High School in Weldon, North Carolina. He ran track and field and played wide receiver and defensive end on the school's football team. He earned a Bachelor of Arts degree in political science from North Carolina State University.

== Career ==
Smith served as a police officer in the Raleigh Police Department for four years, through 1987, when he went to work for the United States Department of State as a special agent in the Diplomatic Security Service.

In 2000, he was deputy regional security officer in Cairo. In 2004, he was regional security officer in Tokyo. He was director of the Office of Physical Security Programs. In 2009, he was as deputy assistant secretary and assistant director for countermeasures. In 2014, President Barack Obama nominated Smith as Director of the Office of Foreign Missions.

On January 26, 2017, when Rex Tillerson, Donald Trump's nominee for United States Secretary of State, visited the United States State Department, Smith, Patrick F. Kennedy, Joyce Anne Barr, and Michele Bond were all simultaneously asked to resign.

In November 2020, Smith was named a volunteer member of the Joe Biden presidential transition Agency Review Team to support transition efforts related to the United States Department of State.

== Personal life ==
Smith is married and has four children.
