= Sheila Isham =

American printmaker (1927–2024)

- Born: Sheila Burton Eaton; December 19, 1927; New York City, U.S.
- Died: April 9, 2024 (aged 96); New York City, U.S.
- Education: Bryn Mawr College, Academy of Arts, Berlin
- Spouse: Heyward Isham
- Children: 3, including Chris Isham
- Website: www.sheilaisham.org

Sheila Burton Eaton Isham (December 19, 1927 – April 9, 2024) was an American printmaker, painter and book artist.

== Biography ==
Sheila Burton Eaton was born in New York City on December 19, 1927. She was raised in Cedarhurst and later attended the college preparatory school, Garrison Forest School.

Isham attended Bryn Mawr College, where she met her future husband Heyward Isham who was attending college at Yale University. After graduating from Byrn Mawr, the couple married. Isham studied at Akademie der Künste in West Berlin (now Academy of Arts, Berlin), between 1950 and 1954.

In 2004, the State Russian Museum presented a 50-year retrospective of her work. Her work is included in the collections of the Smithsonian American Art Museum, Guild Hall in East Hampton, New York, the Museum of Modern Art, New York, the National Gallery of Art, the National Museum of Women in the Arts, the Baltimore Museum of Art, the Library of Congress, the San Francisco Museum of Modern Art, the Walker Art Center, the Yale University Art Gallery, the Princeton University Art Museum, the Philadelphia Museum of Art, the New York Public Library, the Hirshhorn Museum and Sculpture Garden, and many others.

Isham died from pneumonia in Manhattan, on April 9, 2024, at the age of 96.
