= Michael Evanoff =

American government official (born 1961)

Michael T. Evanoff
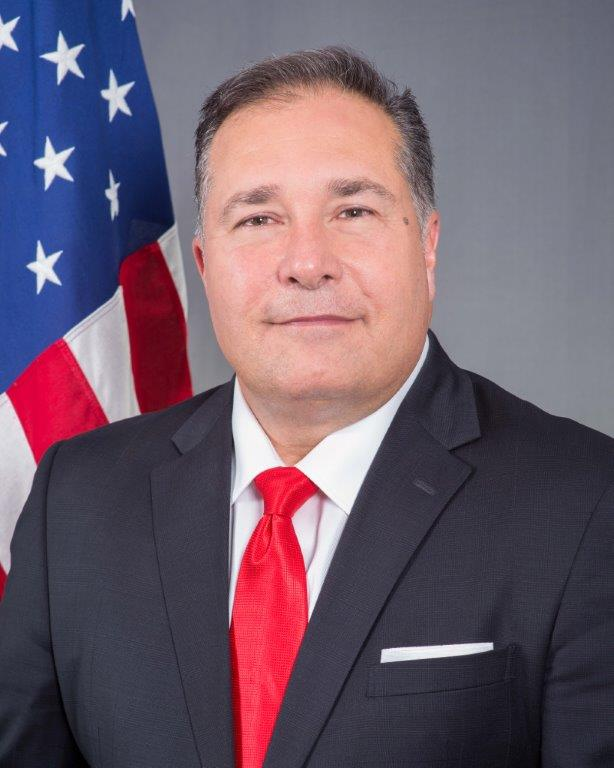

Assistant Secretary of State for Diplomatic Security
- In office November 3, 2017 – July 24, 2020
- President: Donald Trump
- Preceded by: Gregory B. Starr
- Succeeded by: Gentry O. Smith

Personal details
- Born: 1961 (age 64–65)
- Education: Eastern Kentucky University

Michael Turner Evanoff (born 1961) is an American security expert and government official who served as the Assistant Secretary of State for Diplomatic Security. Prior to assuming that role, he served as Vice President for Asset Protection & Security for Walmart from 2014 to 2017. Evanoff previously served as Chief Security Officer at Coca-Cola and as Global Director of Security at Och-Ziff Capital Management. From 1985 to 2011, he served as a special agent in the Department of State's Bureau of Diplomatic Security, where he held senior positions with the Overseas Security Advisory Council, NATO Office of Security, Secretary of State protection detail, and eight U.S. missions overseas. In his capacity at the State Department, he provided personal protection services to former U.S. Secretary of State Condoleezza Rice.

In June 2018, Evanoff was tasked with assessing the situation arising from a mysterious illness affecting American diplomats and their families in Guangzhou, China, to ensure this was given the due priority that Secretary of State Mike Pompeo had demanded.

In February 2019, Evanoff announced a bounty of up to $1 million for information leading to the capture of Hamza bin Laden, the son of Osama bin Laden, who was seen as "an emerging Al-Qaeda leader" who "had threatened attacks against the United States and allies”. He described the announcement as a new tool of the State Departments fight against Al-Qaeda.

Evanoff resigned as Assistant Secretary of State for Diplomatic Security in July 2020. He was succeeded by Acting Assistant Secretary Bureau of Diplomatic Security Todd J. Brown.
