= Robert Michael Snyder =

American chess author and criminal

Robert Michael Snyder (born May 4, 1954) is an American chess teacher, author, and convicted child sexual abuser.

== Career ==
Self-taught, Snyder began his chess career playing speed chess for small stakes, and accumulated a "humongous library" of 1,500 chess books. After becoming the Western United States champion at age 19, he decided in 1976 that chess was "a poor man's sport" and decided to become a chess teacher.

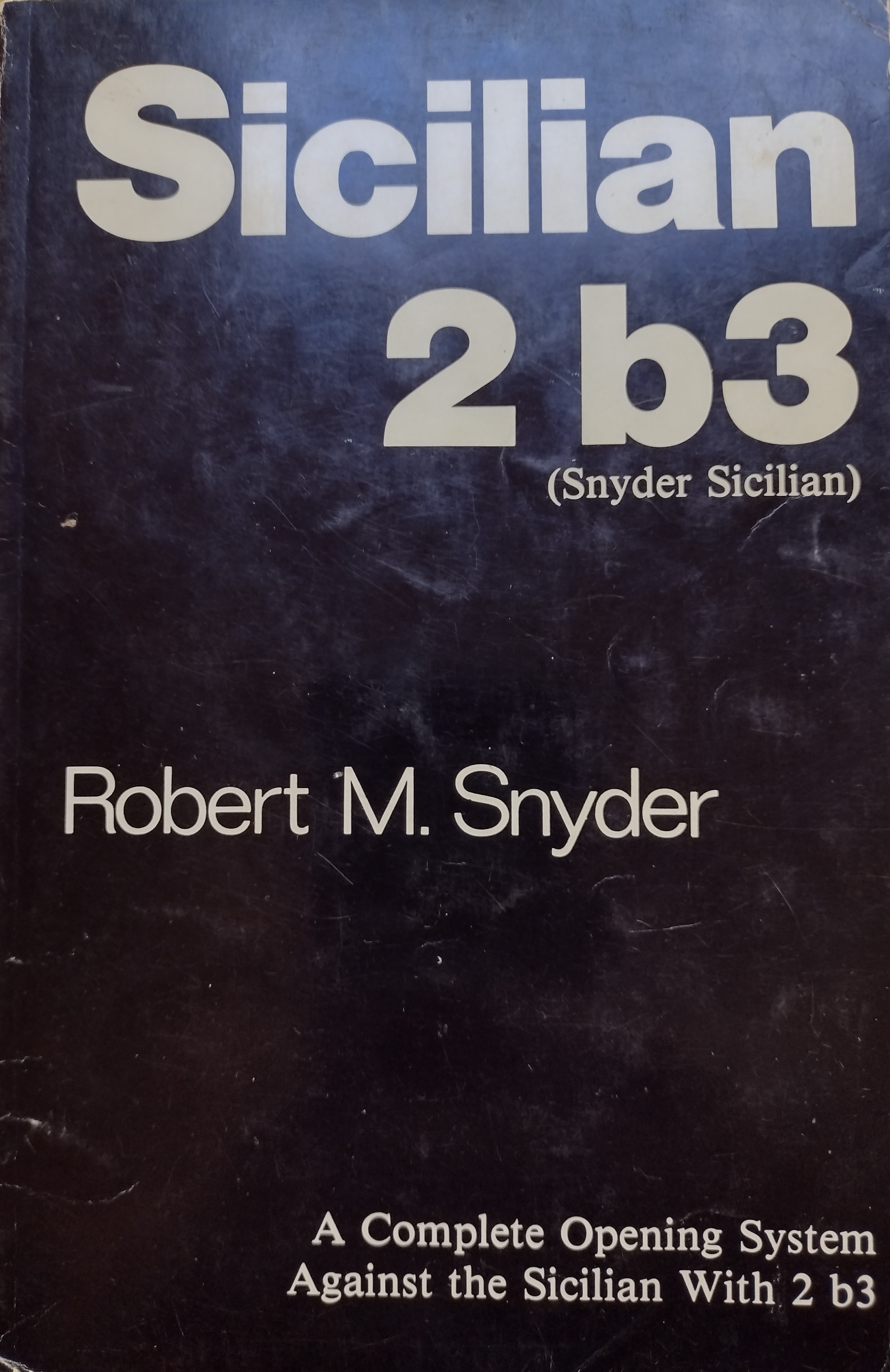
Snyder's first chess opening book, Sicilian 2 b3 (Snyder Sicilian)

His first book, Sicilian 2 b3 (Snyder Sicilian) was published in 1983, in which 14 of the 75 analyzed games are from his own tournament experience.

Snyder is best known for authoring the Chess For Juniors children's book series. He has published multiple books and games, including Chess for Everyone and Unbeatable Chess Lessons. He founded the Chess for Juniors club, saying in 1997 that it was the largest of its kind in the country, and that he trained 36 national chess champions, and holds a world record for having introduced chess to more than 170,000 students. He is considered to be a national and world-renowned master chess player with wins both in the US and international tournaments. Several of his students have excelled under his coaching, with results including contention for world and US national chess titles.

Snyder has an Elo rating of 2306 with the United States Chess Federation, but has not played in tournaments since 1990.

== Criminal cases ==
Snyder has been arrested and convicted for multiple sexual assaults involving young boys dating back to 1983. He was featured on America's Most Wanted after fleeing Colorado while still on supervised probation in 2008. He was found in Belize, and on March 30, 2010, after pleading guilty, was given an open (up to life) sentence.
