= Richard J. Griffin =

American politician

Richard Griffin
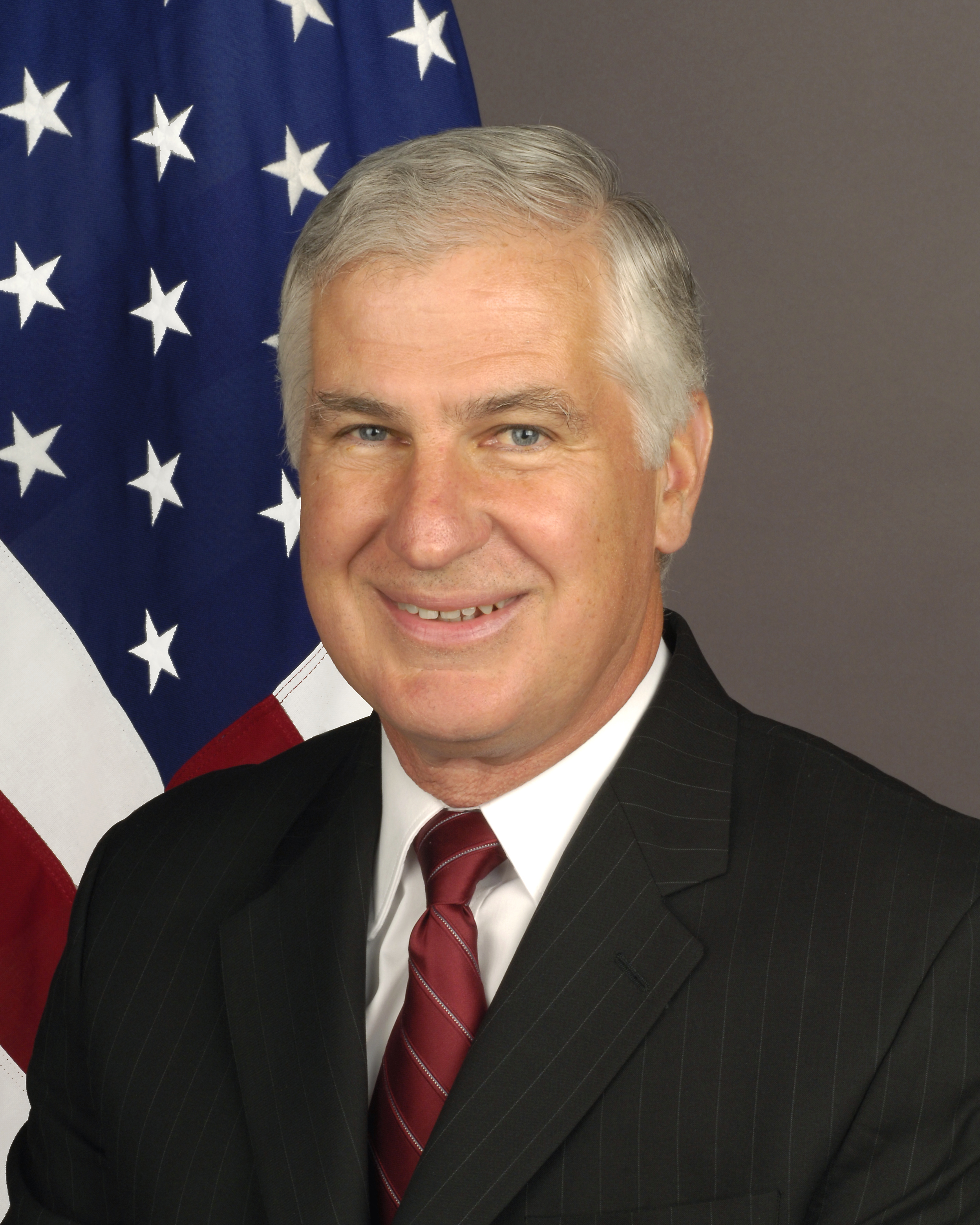
- Griffin in 2005.

Assistant Secretary of State for Diplomatic Security
- In office June 22, 2005 – November 1, 2007
- Preceded by: Francis X. Taylor
- Succeeded by: Eric J. Boswell

Personal details
- Born: Richard Joseph Griffin; October 9, 1949 (age 76) Chicago, Illinois, U.S.
- Education: Xavier University; National War College; Marymount University (MBA)

Richard Joseph Griffin (born October 9, 1949 in Chicago, Illinois) is an American politician who served as the assistant secretary of state for diplomatic security, as well as director of the Office of Foreign Missions with the rank of Ambassador, from June 2005 until November 2007. His early career was with the U.S. Secret Service. He served as the Inspector General in the U.S. Department of Veterans Affairs from 1997 to 2005 and returned to that office as the Deputy Inspector General in 2008. He resigned in 2015 after becoming Acting Inspector General in 2013.

In 1971, Griffin earned a bachelor's degree in Economics from Xavier University before becoming a Secret Service agent assigned to the Chicago office. He graduated from the National War College in 1983 and received a master's degree in Business Administration from Marymount University in May 1984.

As the Assistant Secretary of State for Diplomatic Security appointed by George W. Bush, he was responsible for the department's oversight of private security contractor Blackwater USA, hired to protect U.S. officials in Iraq. The infamous Blackwater Baghdad shootings occurred under his aegis, where 17 civilians, including children, were killed. A critical review by the House Oversight Committee found that his office had failed to properly supervise Blackwater and he subsequently resigned in November 2007.

Just months after this, Griffin was hired at Department of Veterans Affairs as Deputy Inspector General by then-Inspector General George Opfer; the two men were part of a tight-knit community of former Secret Service guards. Here he was the lead investigator looking into long wait times for veterans seeking health care. He is famous for having concluded he was “unable to conclusively assert” that delays at the Phoenix VA Health Care System had caused patients to die.

Opfer resigned in 2013, and Griffin became Acting Inspector General. He continued to face criticism on the wait times affair and on July 6, 2015 was replaced by Linda A. Halliday.

Government offices
Preceded by Francis X. Taylor	Assistant Secretary of State for Diplomatic Security; 2005 – 2007	Succeeded by Gregory B. Starr
