= David Veness =

Sir David Veness CBE QPM

Assistant Commissioner for Specialist Operations, Metropolitan police
- In office 1994–2005
- Succeeded by: Andy Hayman

United Nations Under-Secretary-General for Safety and Security
- In office 2005–2008

Personal details
- Born: David Christopher Veness London
- Profession: Police officer

Sir David Christopher Veness, CBE, QPM is a British former senior police officer and United Nations official. He served as Assistant Commissioner for Specialist Operations in the Metropolitan Police from 1994 to 2005, leaving to serve as United Nations Under-Secretary-General for Safety and Security.

== Early life and police career ==
Veness was educated at Raynes Park High School, London, and at Trinity College, Cambridge, where he gained Master of Arts and Master of Laws degrees.

After two years as a police cadet, he joined the Metropolitan Police in 1966, transferring to the Criminal Investigation Department in 1969, serving in various roles across London and at the Met's headquarters, Scotland Yard. Veness trained as a negotiator in 1979, directing the Met's negotiator course from 1980 to 1987, a role which placed him on the negotiating team at the 1980 Iranian Embassy Siege and in which he was lead negotiator in the siege of the Libyan embassy following the murder of Yvonne Fletcher as well as advising on other incidents worldwide. Promoted to commander in 1987, Veness went on to head the Protection Command, responsible for the protection of royalty and politicians before assuming the role of Commander Public Order, Territorial Security and Operational Support followed by promotion to Deputy Assistant Commissioner at Specialist Operations in November 1991.

Veness was further promoted to Assistant Commissioner, Specialist Operations on 5 April 1994. He was awarded the Queen's Police Medal in the 1994 Queen's Birthday Honours, appointed Commander of the Order of the British Empire in the 2000 Queen's Birthday Honours, and knighted in the 2005 New Year Honours. He received the accolade from Queen Elizabeth II at Buckingham Palace.

== United Nations ==
On 13 January 2005 the UN announced that Veness was to become the first Under-Secretary-General of the United Nations for Safety and Security. He left the Met later in 2005, succeeded in his role by Andy Hayman. Veness resigned his UN post in June 2008 after an internal investigation into a terrorist attack on Algiers in which his department was heavily criticised.
