= Chris Isham (journalist) =

American journalist

Christopher Isham is an American journalist. Isham spent nineteen years with ABC News, beginning as an associate producer in 1978, and eventually serving as ABC's Chief of Investigative Projects. He was the Chief of CBS News' Washington Bureau from 2007 to 2020. In addition to his roles with ABC and CBS, he helped build the website The Blotter with investigative reporter Brian Ross.

== Life and career ==
Chris Isham, the son of Heyward Isham, a Foreign Service Officer and Sheila Eaton, an artist, was born in Berlin. He Groton School and graduated from Yale University in 1976 and began his career in the documentary unit at NBC News.

In January 1977, Isham married Nima Farmanfarmaian, the daughter of Iranian artists Manoucher Yektai and Monir Farmanfarmaian, in Port au Prince, where his father was an Ambassador to Haiti. Isham and his wife lived in New York and were friends of pop artist Andy Warhol.

In 1978 he became an associate producer at ABC News.

In May 1998, Isham organized the first major network interview with Osama bin Laden, and broke other major stories exposing security threats at U.S. airports, CIA interrogation techniques, post-Hurricane Katrina insurance fraud, and secret tapes of Saddam Hussein.

Isham was Chief of Investigative Projects for ABC News in New York from 2001-2007 where he built an investigative unit that has been recognized as one of the most successful of its kind in television news. His unit was responsible for breaking hundreds of new stories and exclusive reports on a range of topics from terrorism to political corruption. At ABC, Isham produced the programming for all ABC broadcasts including, ABC World News Tonight, Nightline, 20/20, Primetime, Good Morning America, ABC News Radio, and ABCNews.com. His unit also built an investigative site called the "Blotter" on ABCNews.com that broke many major stories including the Mark Foley story.

Isham was the Vice President and Washington Bureau Chief for CBS News from 2007 to 2020, where he was responsible for news gathering, personnel, and technical operations for all major CBS News broadcasts.

Isham faced significant questions about his journalistic ethics in 2011 when it was revealed by the Daily Beast that he was a confidential informant for the FBI in the 90s.

== Accolades ==
Isham has been the recipient of numerous major industry awards throughout his career including multiple news Emmys, two Columbia DuPont Awards, a Peabody Award, four National Headliner Awards, two Overseas Press Club Awards, the ABA Gavel Award, the Joan Shorenstein Barone Award and three Edward R. Murrow Awards from the Radio Television News Directors Association (RTNDA) and an Investigative Reporters and Editors Award for online journalism.
