= David G. Carpenter =

American security expert

Assistant Secretary of State for Diplomatic Security
- In office August 11, 1998 – June 29, 2002
- Preceded by: Eric J. Boswell
- Succeeded by: Francis X. Taylor

Personal details
- Born: 1947 (age 77–78); Denver, Colorado, U.S.
- Education: Oklahoma State University (BA)

David Gordon Carpenter (born 1947) is an American security expert who served as US Assistant Secretary of State for Diplomatic Security from 1998 to 2002. Carpenter was previously a long-serving U.S. Secret Service agent.

Born in Denver, Colorado, Carpenter received a B.A. in Personnel Management from Oklahoma State University.

Carpenter entered the United States Secret Service in the early 1960s, serving for 26 years, with assignments including tours of duty in Phoenix, Arizona, and Los Angeles, California, as well as permanent assignments to protective details with Presidents Richard Nixon, Gerald Ford, Jimmy Carter, and George H. W. Bush. He retired from the Secret Service in January of 1998 as Special Agent in Charge of the Washington Field Office.

As Assistant Secretary of State, Carpenter developed an expanded counter-surveillance program as a security measure for U.S. embassies.

== See also ==
- List of Assistant Secretaries of State for Diplomatic Security from State Dept. Historian

Government offices
Preceded by Eric J. Boswell	Assistant Secretary of State for Diplomatic Security; August 11, 1998 – June 29, 2002	Succeeded by Francis X. Taylor
