= David Carpenter (cricketer) =

English cricketer (1935–2022)

Personal information
- Born: 12 September 1935; Rodborough, Stroud, Gloucestershire
- Died: 4 January 2022 (aged 86)
- Batting: Right-handed

Domestic team information
- Years: Team
- 1954–1963: Gloucestershire

Career statistics
Competition	First-class	List A
Matches	117	1
Runs scored	3,741	1
Batting average	18.33	1.00
100s/50s	0/17	0/0
Top score	95	1
Balls bowled	96	0
Wickets	0	0
Bowling average	–	–
5 wickets in innings	0	–
10 wickets in match	0	–
Best bowling	–	–
Catches/stumpings	72/–	0/–
- Source: Cricinfo, 23 June 2014

David Carpenter (12 September 1935 – 4 January 2022) was an English first-class cricketer who played for Gloucestershire from 1954 to 1963.

== Life and career ==
Born in Rodborough, Stroud, Carpenter was educated at Tetbury Grammar School. A right-handed opening or middle-order batsman, he made his debut for Gloucestershire Second XI in 1953. After scoring 119 in three hours against a Bristol University team in June 1954 he was promoted to the senior team. He played 12 first-class matches that season but scored only 264 runs at an average of 13.20 with a top score of 41.

After national service in the Royal Air Force he returned to county cricket in 1957, and despite scoring a quick 193 out of a team total of 291 for 5 for the Second XI against Somerset Second XI he was unable to make an impact at the first-class level. He again struggled in 1958, but he scored his first fifty: 74, in what Wisden called a "polished display", and 32 against Glamorgan.

Carpenter established himself in 1961, scoring 1353 runs at 23.32 in what turned out to be his only full season in the First XI. Having previously scored only two fifties in his first 56 matches, he scored 10 fifties in 30 matches in 1961, with a top score of 89 against Somerset, and 85 three days later against the touring Australians, when he put on 119 for the first wicket with Martin Young.

He played most of the season in 1962 and made his highest score, 95 against Derbyshire, but otherwise he was less successful than in 1961. After a lean season in 1963, he retired from first-class cricket.

After his cricket career, Carpenter had a successful career in the brewing industry. He died on 4 January 2022, at the age of 86.
