= Goodwin Cooke =

American diplomat

Goodwin Cooke (born 1931) is a Professor of Practice Emeritus in International Relations at Maxwell School of Citizenship and Public Affairs of Syracuse University and was a U.S. foreign service officer who served as ambassador to the Central African Republic (October 11, 1978 – July 13, 1980).

== Education ==
- B.A., Harvard University, 1953, major math and physics

== Career ==
After graduation, Cooke joined the Marines and served as an engineer officer abroad. When he left the Corps, he worked as a manager in a manufacturing firm before taking a 50% pay cut to work in Washington, D.C.
