= Murder of Cynthia Garcia =

2001 murder by the Hells Angels in Mesa, Arizona, United States

The murder of Cynthia Yvonne Garcia by the Hells Angels took place on October 25, 2001, in Mesa, Arizona and is a well known criminal case in Arizona.

== The victim ==
Cynthia Garcia was a 44-year old impoverished woman who had been married as a teenager and was divorced in her 20s. She had six children by various men ranging in age from 26 for her oldest child, Bianca, to 11 for her youngest child, Angelina. Angelina Garcia told the Canadian journalists Julian Sher and William Marsden that her mother was "Funny. She was really loveable." Oliva Garcia told Sher and Marsden: "She always wanted the best for us. She taught us to be honest. To live a good life." Owing to her poverty, Garcia lived at home with her parents. Though described as a kind and gentle woman, Garcia was known for her substance abuse of alcohol. One relative stated: "Drinking was her downfall." Garcia had a practice of wandering the streets of Mesa looking for alcohol and random men to have sex with.

== The Hells Angels ==
The Dirty Dozen Motorcycle Club of Arizona was considered to be one of the most vicious biker gangs in the United States. In 1997, the Dirty Dozen "patched over" to join the Hells Angels. Amongst the members of the Mesa chapter of the Hells Angels were Michael Kramer, Paul Merle Eischeid and Kevin Augustiniak. Kramer was an alcoholic and a methamphetamine addict who served prison sentences for assault and robbery. His longest prison sentence was for four years between 1986-1990 for robbery, and after his release he worked as a garbageman. Kramer later told a court: "I thought it was cool to hang around with the bikers. Liked the image and at times the violence. I wasn't in it for the chicks or the money."

Augustiniak was a career criminal with convictions for trespassing, assault, drunk driving, and resisting arrest. In February 2001, he appeared at a "family day" event where a mother told him to be careful as he staggered around drunk as there were children present, which led him to punch her in the face with such force that he broke her jaw. In June 2001 after his release from prison following his assault conviction, he became angry with his neighbor for banging his boots against the wall of their duplex building. He confronted his neighbor with his pistol and shot him twice, leaving the man seriously wounded on their front lawn. One of the arresting officers, Chris Hoffman, stated at the time of the arrest: "He was emotionless." The other arresting officer, Charles "Chuck" Schoville, told Sher and Marsden: ""Let's face it, when you shoot a neighbor for making noise, that's not normal. Kevin was just a loose cannon."

In contrast to the working class Augustiniak and Kramer, Eischeid was a solidly middle-class man who worked as a successful stockbroker. Despite being clean shaven and respectable looking, Eischeid had covered his entire torso with tattoos with the Hells Angels death's head logo and "Hell 666 Bound" being prominently tattooed on his chest. Eischeid did not have a criminal record. The journalist Kerrie Droban stated: "He was unusually handsome. He was charming. He was articulate because he was a former stockbroker. He was very disarming that way and that was one of the reasons he was construed as so dangerous."

== The murder ==
On the evening of Thursday, October 25, 2001, a group of Hells Angels wearing their club colors were drinking at a bar in Gilbert led by the Mesa chapter president Robert "Bad Bob" Johnson. When the bar closed at 1:30 am, the Hells Angels returned to their clubhouse in Mesa to continue drinking. Amongst those drinking that night were Kramer, Augustiniak and Eischeid. The Angels sent out a "prospect" (the second level in an outlaw biker club), Kelby Randolph, on "a scavenger hunt for pussy" as it was phrased as the Angels wanted women for sex. In particular, the Angels wanted Randolph to bring an attractive woman in a red dress whom they had seen earlier and whom Randolph failed to find. Randolph was then sent in the words of Kramer "in search of any female that he could find". Randolph returned with Garcia whom he had found wandering the streets of Mesa.

Garcia drank prodigious amounts of alcohol from the Angels clubhouse bar and the atmosphere was jovial at first. Kramer later testified that Garcia had started to "talk trash" about the Angels under the influence of alcohol. Kramer grabbed her by the hair and told her that the Angels would not tolerate abuse of their club within their own clubhouse, especially from a woman. Augustiniak complained that "she's acting stupid" and punched Garcia in the face with such force as to knock her straight to the ground. According to Kramer in his confession, both Eischeid and Augustiniak then beat Garcia, punching and kicking her while cursing her as a "dumb bitch". Kramer wrote that: "She was bleeding and semi-conscious." Kramer in his confession stated that he, Augustiniak and Eischeid forced her into the trunk of his automobile. Kramer wrote: "Eischeid got in the driver's seat, Augustiniak got in the front passenger seat and I got in the backseat. We drove to a remote location in the desert." Garcia screamed and kicked from the trunk. Augustiniak wanted Garcia to be killed to punish her for insulting the Hells Angels. Kramer told the police: "I had an idea what was going to happen and could not believe it."

The three Angels drove past Apache Junction and parked their car in a remote area of the desert, off Usury Pass Road close to the Salt River. According to Kramer, Garcia was dragged out of the trunk and he stated that Eischeid pulled out his knife to stab her in the chest several times. Augustiniak likewise pulled out his knife to join in the stabbing frenzy. Garcia was stabbed at least 20 times in the chest, but was still alive. According to his account, Kramer joined in to stab Garcia in the neck. At the end of the stabbing frenzy, Garcia was still alive, albeit barely, as she gurgled and gasped for air as she was drowning in her blood within her lungs. Kramer stated that Eischeid then proceeded alone to stab Garcia again. She reached out to grab Kramer by his leg and then let go as the life drained out of her. After her death, Augustiniak decided to behead her as he wanted Garcia's head as a morbid trophy, and then decided to place her head on a fence post. Augustiniak tried to saw off Garcia's head, but the blade on his knife was too dull. Her corpse was dumped into a shallow grave and the three Angels drove back to Mesa, in a joyous mood.

The killers upon their return to the clubhouse handed over their clothing and boots to a "prospect", Richard Hyder, who burned them. The carpeting from the trunk of Kramer's car was ripped out by Kramer and Eischeid who washed down the car several times. The murder weapons were dumped in a waste disposal site.

Jenna Maguire, an undercover agent of the Bureau of Alcohol, Tobacco and Firearms Control (ATF) who played the girlfriend of the ATF agent Jay Dobyns during Operation Black Biscuit in 2002-2003 said of the murder: "Cynthia had back-talked one of the members while sitting at the bar. She was punched in the face and knocked to the ground. And they proceeded to beat her so badly that they decided they needed to kill her. They took her out to the desert and slit her throat...Just thinking about what must have been going through her mind. Her children, and how terrified she must have been was a very scary reality for me at the time."

== Investigation ==
Bianca Garcia believed it odd that her mother had not contacted her or returned home, but knowing of her mother's problems with substance abuse did not contact the police until the weekend to report her missing. On Halloween, Garcia's corpse was discovered rotting by the roadside in a very shallow grave. The police took impressions of the tire marks and shoe prints in the desert along with the cigarette butts found at the crime scene. Dr. Laura Fulginiti, the coroner for Mesa, found 27 stab wounds in Garcia's corpse and her throat had been cut three times. Fulginiti identified Garcia via finger prints and dental records. The police had no suspects and no leads.

Kramer developed a crisis of conscience after the murder. He told the detectives that he had decided to turn state's evidence because: "What happened in the desert was screwed up. The murder was screwed up. I didn't become an informant to make money or retaliate. I got a conscience." Ellen Barry, the lawyer for Augustiniak, disputes this account and she told Sher and Marsden: "He [Kramer] characterizes himself as a somewhat passive participant in this whole event. He portrayed himself as having this big crisis of conscience. But the fact of the matter is he knew his ass was going to jail for the rest of his life and he ratted first. He realized that somebody was going to rat and so he was out first."

A few days after the murder, Kramer used a friend to contact Sergeant Charles "Chuck" Schoville of the Mesa police about turning state's evidence. Schoville met Kramer at Stuart Anderson's, a steakhouse located out in the desert about 35 miles west of Phoenix. Kramer exposed his Hells Angels death's head tattoo on his arm to Schoville to prove to him that he really was in the Hells Angels and was not a crank. Kramer did not speak of the murder directly, and frequently used the word "hypothetical". As the meeting ended, Schoville told Kramer: "There something a little strange here. You keep telling me, 'what if, what if'. But what is it you want?" Kramer answered by saying he wanted out of the Hells Angels and money for testifying against the other Hells Angels. Schoville met Kramer several times afterwards over the following weeks, and in their meetings Kramer alluded to Garcia's murder by speaking of a "stabbing" he had seen. Schoville decided that his department did not have the expertise to handle a Hells Angels case, and the task of running Kramer as an informer was assigned to John Ciccone of the ATF. On 26 November 2001 at the Los Angeles office of the ATF, Kramer was signed up by Ciccone as informer CI-78400-376. Ciccone reported that Kramer had "revealed a significant amount of intelligence" about several unsolved murders in the Southwest along with drug trafficking and gunrunning. However, Kramer did not mention the murder of Garcia and instead talked only about a "hypothetical murder" he may or may not had witnessed. On 1 December 2001, Kramer signed an "informant agreement" with the ATF which forbade him taking part "in acts of violence". Ciccone told Sher and Marsden that he suspected that Kramer had not revealed all, but that "I knew at some point in time, we'd get the full story."

Ciccone used Kramer as part of Operation Dequiallo. Kramer told Ciccone that he was willing to start buying arms and drugs from Hells Angels chapters in California and Arizona. Ciccone said: "We had him going everywhere. It's a once-in-a-lifetime shot. we got as much mileage as we could out of it." As Ciccone was based in Los Angeles, Kramer transferred over to the Hells Angels San Fernando Valley chapter. The murder of Garcia was listed by the police as an unsolved murder, and the connection was not drawn at first to Kramer's vague remarks about a stabbing in the desert. Schoville told Sher and Marsden: "We knew it was in the desert, but that's like telling someone up in Alaska it's in the snow." In February 2002, Schoville called Dr. Fulginiti, the forensic anthropologist for Maricopa county, to ask her: "Hey, doc, here's the deal. I'm looking for a homicide -- a female, stabbed multiple times sometime in the last six months and she was dumped in the desert." Fulginiti answered that he must be referring to the murder of Garcia. Under pressure from Ciccone, Kramer agreed to wear a wire to get Augsustiniak and Escheid to speak of the murder even as he continued to deny any role in the murder himself.

On 15 March 2002, Kramer met Eischeid in a room bugged by the ATF who had also installed a secret camera to say farewell due to his pending transfer to the San Fernando Valley chapter. At 8:45 pm on 15 March, Eischeid arrived at Kramer's house and stayed until 10: 10 pm. As the two drank conspicuous amounts of beer, Kramer gave Eischeid a hunting knife, which he noted was the perfect weapon for killing women. Kramer joked that Augustiniak was now "the Decapitator", which led Eischeid to laugh and say that he liked the nickname "Decapitator Kevin". Both men were recorded as having discussed the murder of Garcia. Eischeid's principal concern in the conversation was that there still might be lingering evidence linking him to the murder. Eischeid was recorded as saying to Kramer: "She's nobody. No one cares. No one probably even reported her missing. They probably found her...probably fucking put a Jane Doe on her." At one point, Eischeid said: "Yeah, I mean, unless somebody connects the two. There's no way anyone would connect it to us. And you know what? She's probably a fucking crack whore, a fucking bitch; no one's gonna miss her. I think she's a Mesa whore... And that's why there's no connection, there's no DNA." According to the recordings, Eischeid expressed concern that the carpet at the clubhouse might still be stained with Garcia's blood, but Kramer told him that he had cleaned the carpet several times. In the recordings, Eischeid stated: "That was just the icing on the cake, but I did a lot of other shit that most people don't do, you know."

On 16 March 2002, Kramer drove out to Augustiniak's house while wearing two wires. The two men had dinner at a Chinese restaurant, Long Wongs, in Tempe from noon to about 3 pm. Likewise, Kramer presented Augustiniak with the farewell gift of a hunting knife. Augustiniak told Kramer that other members of the Mesa chapter had wanted "to check that place out" but it was felt to be unnecessary, a statement which implied that the other members of the Mesa chapter were aware of the details of Garcia's killing. Kramer told Augustiniak that the hunting knife he gave him was very good for sawing off the heads of women and that this knife would not fail him like the knife that he used to try to saw off Garcia's head. Augustiniak replied: "That edge-I won't have a problem like I did last time." Kramer told Augustiniak: "Yeah, fucking take it all off! That's actually why I got you that particular one. It looked like you enjoyed yourself, but it was too hard for ya." Augustiniak answered: "I still couldn't accomplish what I was trying to do, so it sucked. I was yelling at her and everything."

Ciccone learned from listening to the recordings that Kramer had also stabbed Garcia. Ciccone told Sher and Marsden: "He apparently wasn't going to incriminate himself until he had some kind of deal in writing." Ciccone was much more interested in having Kramer wear a wire and record the Hells Angels in various drug and gun deals, which required that no charges being laid against Augustiniak and Eischeid for the moment as he wished to keep Kramer working as an informer. It was not until February 2003 that Kramer signed a confession that admitted to his own role in Garcia's murder. However, the ATF was more concerned with prosecuting those Angels involved in the Laughlin River Run riot than with those involved in Garcia's murder. Schoville met with Garcia's family to tell them one of her killers was working as an ATF informer and that they would have to wait until charges were laid against the other two killers. Schoville told them that his own Mexican-American mother had been beheaded by her boyfriend and that: "My mother was killed, my mother was Mexican. I know what you're going through. It will work out in the end." It took Schoville three meetings to persuade the Garcia family to wait. In the spring of 2003, Augsustiniak was due in court for charges of assault, and in a plea bargain the prosecutors reduce his sentence to 1 year in exchange for a guilty plea. The intention was to keep Augustiniak behind bars in order to lay charges of first-degree murder against him later.

By the end of 2003, Operation Dequaillo was considered complete as Kramer had gathered enough evidence to lay charges. On 10 November 2003, Kramer pleaded guilty to the murder of Garcia and received as his sentence five years of probation, which ensured that he served no prison time. On 3 December 2003, the ATF launched raids to arrest 51 Hells Angels in Washington state, California, Alaska, Nevada and Arizona. The indictment against Augustiniak and Eischeid charged them with kidnapping, first degree murder and racketeering under the grounds that the murder of Garcia was for the purpose of "maintaining or increasing" their reputations within the Hells Angels. Eischeid was arrested at his house on North Saint Elias Street in Mesa. Found inside of Escheid's house were a Ruger .22 semi-automatic handgun; a Glock pistol; a Mossberg 12-gauge shotgun; a Bushmaster semi-automatic rifle, 1600 rounds of ammunition, a bulletproof vest and a ball-peen hammer (the favorite weapon of the Hells Angels). As Eischeid had no criminal record and was a respected stockbroker for the Security Trust Company who owned two houses in Mesa, he was able to make bail. On 28 July 2004, Eischeid threw a party at his house, which was his farewell party. On 29 July 2004, he broke his electronic ankle bracelet and fled the United States. In 2006, Bianca Garcia told Sher and Marsden that she planned to attend the trials of Augustiniak and Eischeid as: "I want to see who they are. I want them to see who she was. She had family. She had people who cared for her."

== Trial ==
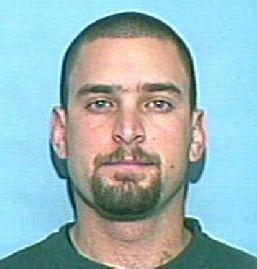
Paul Merle Eischeid

Patricia Gitre, one of the lawyers for Augustiniak, accused Kramer of being the killer who blamed the others for a crime he committed. In a motion, Gitre asked the judge to dismiss the charges under the grounds that Kramer was a "murderer". Gitre told Sher and Marsden that she was disgusted by Kramer and that: "They gave him a license to lie, cheat and steal. He did meth on a daily basis. He used a knife, carried a gun. And all because he could. This guy got away with murder." Gitre portrayed her client as an innocent man framed for murder by Kramer.

Eischeid was arrested in Buenos Aires on 5 February 2011. He was living with his Argentine wife and son, and contested the extradition request from the United States. In Argentina, Eischeid's attempt to contest the extradition request generated much public support.

In a plea bargain, Augustiniak pleaded guilty to second degree murder for killing Garcia in October 2011. On 30 March 2012, he was sentenced to 23 years in prison with a six-year credit for the time served in jail awaiting trial. Eischeid was extradited from Argentina to the United States on 18 July 2018. In August 2021, Eischeid was sentenced to 19 years in prison for second degree murder. Eischeid is due to be released in January 2030 while Augustiniak is due to be released in 2026.

== Books ==
- Sher, Julian; Marsden, William (2006). Angels of Death: Inside the Bikers' Empire of Crime. Toronto: Alfred Knopf Canada. ISBN 9780307370327.
