= W. Nathaniel Howell =

American diplomat (1939–2020)

W. Nathaniel Howell

Wilson Nathaniel "Nat" Howell (September 14, 1939 – December 17, 2020) was an American diplomat and educator. He served as the United States Ambassador to Kuwait from 1987 to 1991.

Born in Portsmouth, Virginia, Howell earned a B.A. at the University of Virginia, 1961. He earned a Ph.D. in Government and Foreign Affairs at UVA, 1965, and entered the Foreign Service. From 1970 to 1972, he studied Arabic at the Foreign Service Institute, Beirut, Lebanon.

On May 26, 1987, President Reagan announced his intention to nominate Howell to be Ambassador of the U.S. to Kuwait. Howell was at his post awaiting reassignment when, on August 2, 1990, Iraq invaded Kuwait. The U.S. Embassy in Kuwait City, was declared closed by Saddam Hussein on August 24, by which time many Americans and other nationals had taken refuge on the embassy compound. Iraq's declaration of the annexation of Kuwait, by means of trumped-up historical, economic and political pretexts, was not recognized by the U.S. It was decided to keep the mission open, under siege, as Iraq would not allow non-diplomats to leave the country (Iraq retained foreign "guests" as human shields, to deter military strikes).

For reasons best known to himself, Saddam relented and allowed all persons on the compound to leave overland, by way of Baghdad, in mid-December 1990, before the start of the Gulf War. At that point, Howell and the remainder of his staff left the embassy unoccupied, though technically not "closed," until his successor, Skip Gnehm, returned upon the liberation of Kuwait.

In 1992, W. Nathaniel Howell joined the faculty of UVA. His positions included diplomat-in-residence; director, Arab Peninsula and Gulf Studies Program; member of the Steering Committee of CIAG; and John Minor Maury Jr., Professor of Public Affairs. He retired as professor emeritus in early 2015. He died in Charlottesville on December 17, 2020, at the age of 81.

== Service chronology ==
Nat Howell's Diplomatic Chronology
Position	Host Location	Year(s)
US Foreign Service	Washington, D.C.	1965 to 1966
US Foreign Service	Cairo, Egypt	1966 to 1967
US Foreign Service (NATO)	Paris, France; Brussels, Belgium	1967
US Foreign Service (INR)	Washington, D.C.	1968 to 1970
US Foreign Service (FSI: Arabic)	Beirut, Lebanon	1970 to 1972
US Foreign Service	Abu Dhabi, UAE	1972 to 1974
US Foreign Service	Beirut, Lebanon	1974 to 1976
US Foreign Service (NEA/ARN)	Washington, D.C.	1976 to 1982
US Foreign Service (NWC)	Fort McNair	1982 to 1983
US Foreign Service (DCM)	Algiers, Algeria	1983 to 1985
US Foreign Service (CENTCOM POLAD)	MacDill AFB	1985 to 1987
U.S. Ambassador	Kuwait City, Kuwait	1987 to 1991

Diplomatic posts
Preceded by Anthony Cecil Eden Quainton	U.S. Ambassador to Kuwait; 1987–1991	Succeeded by Edward William Gnehm, Jr.
