= Eric J. Boswell =

American diplomat

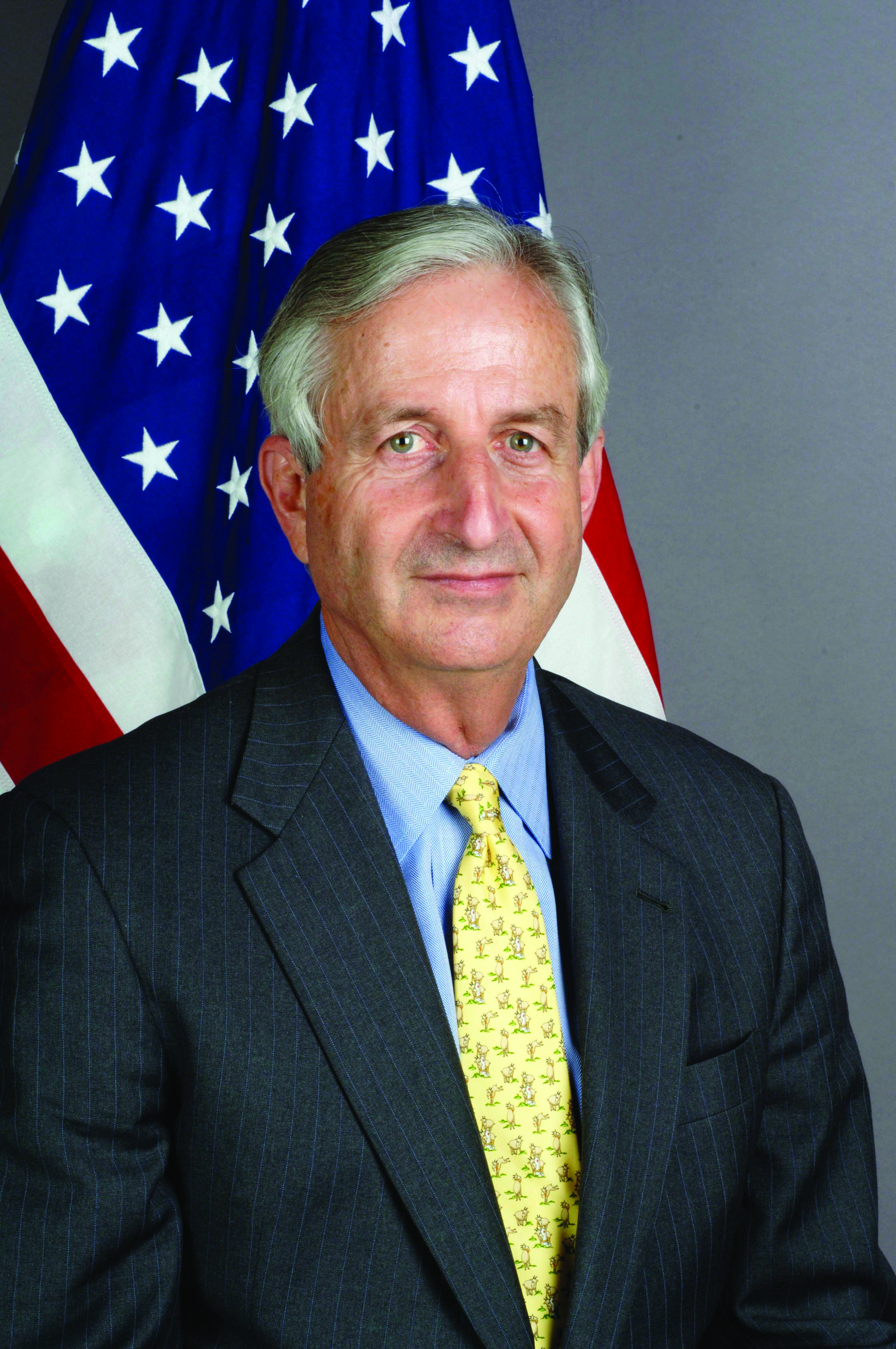

Assistant Secretary of State for Diplomatic Security
- In office January 5, 1996 – January 31, 1998
- Preceded by: Anthony C. E. Quainton
- Succeeded by: David G. Carpenter
- In office July 7, 2008 – December 19, 2012
- Preceded by: Richard J. Griffin
- Succeeded by: Gregory B. Starr

Personal details
- Born: Eric James Boswell; May 31, 1945 (age 81) Naples, Italy
- Education: Stanford University (BA)
- Awards: Distinguished Service Award; Distinguished Honor Award

Eric J. Boswell (born May 31, 1945) is an American diplomat who served as the Assistant Secretary of State for Diplomatic Security from 2008 to 2012. He previously served in the same post from 1996 to 1998.

== Biography ==
=== Early life ===
Eric J. Boswell was born in Naples, Italy on May 31, 1945. From 1968 to 1969, he served in the United States Army. He was educated at Stanford University, graduating with a Bachelor of Arts in 1970.

Boswell joined the United States Foreign Service in 1972. As a Foreign Service Officer, he was posted to Dakar, Senegal 1973-74 and Quebec City 1977–80. He spent 1980–83 in Washington, D.C. working on Near Eastern assignments for the Bureau of Personnel of the United States Department of State. From 1983 to 1985, he was Deputy Executive Director of the Bureau of European and Canadian Affairs. He then returned to the field and was posted in Amman 1985-87 and in Ottawa 1987–90. From 1990 to 1992, he was executive director of the Bureau of Near East and South Asian Affairs. From 1992 to 1993, he was Executive Assistant to the Under Secretary of State for Management.

=== Political career ===
In September 1992, President of the United States George H. W. Bush nominated Boswell as Director of the Office of Foreign Missions and he became Director, with the rank of Ambassador, in May 1993. President Bill Clinton then nominated Boswell as Assistant Secretary of State for Diplomatic Security and Boswell held this office from January 5, 1996, until January 31, 1998.

In 1998, Boswell became Director of Administration for the Pan American Health Organization, a specialized agency of the United Nations, serving there until 2005. In 2004 he served a senior advisor at UN Offices in New York.

From 2005 to 2008, Boswell was Assistant Deputy Director for Security in the Office of the Director of National Intelligence, where he was responsible for the development of security policies and standards in the United States Intelligence Community.

In 2008, President George W. Bush nominated Boswell to a second term as Assistant Secretary of State for Diplomatic Security, and concurrently as Director of the Office of Foreign Missions, with Boswell assuming office on July 7, 2008.

On December 19, 2012, three State Department officials were reported to have resigned under pressure less than a day after a report blamed management failures for a lack of security at the U.S. diplomatic mission in Benghazi, Libya. The Benghazi mission was attacked by militants on September 11, 2012, and the U.S. ambassador and three other Americans died in the attack. On December 19, 2012, an anonymous Obama administration official said Boswell; Charlene Lamb, the deputy assistant secretary responsible for embassy security; and Raymond Maxwell, the deputy assistant secretary of state who oversaw the Maghreb nations of Libya, Algeria, Tunisia and Morocco in the Bureau of Near Eastern Affairs; had stepped down. The report said poor leadership in both bureaus left the post underprotected. Later reports said four individuals were affected but only Boswell had resigned. The other three were "placed on administrative leave and relieved of their duties" and not officially named.

The report by the independent Accountability Review Board found "systemic failures of leadership and management deficiencies at senior levels within two bureaus". The Benghazi post "lacked disciplined oversight of its security operations. [Its] ... ad hoc nature, with inexperienced staff members working there for short periods, 'resulted in diminished institutional knowledge, continuity, and mission capacity'". ARB co-chair Thomas Pickering said "the personnel on the ground in Benghazi had reacted to the attack with bravery and professionalism [but] ... the security precautions were 'grossly inadequate' and the contingent was overwhelmed by the heavily armed militants". In a letter that accompanied the transmission of the report to Capitol Hill, Secretary of State Hillary Clinton "thanked the board for its 'clear-eyed, serious look at serious systemic challenges' and said she accepted its 29 recommendations to improve security at high-threat embassies and consulates".

Government offices
Preceded by Anthony C. E. Quainton	Assistant Secretary of State for Diplomatic Security; January 5, 1996 – January 31, 1998	Succeeded by David G. Carpenter
Preceded by Gregory B. Starr	Assistant Secretary of State for Diplomatic Security; July 7, 2008 – December 19, 2012	Succeeded by Scott Bultrowicz (acting)
