= Carlos Matus =

Carlos Matus may refer to:

- Carlos Matus (politician) (1931–1998), Chilean economist and politician
- Carlos Matus (diplomat) (born 1970), American diplomat
