= Otto Otepka =

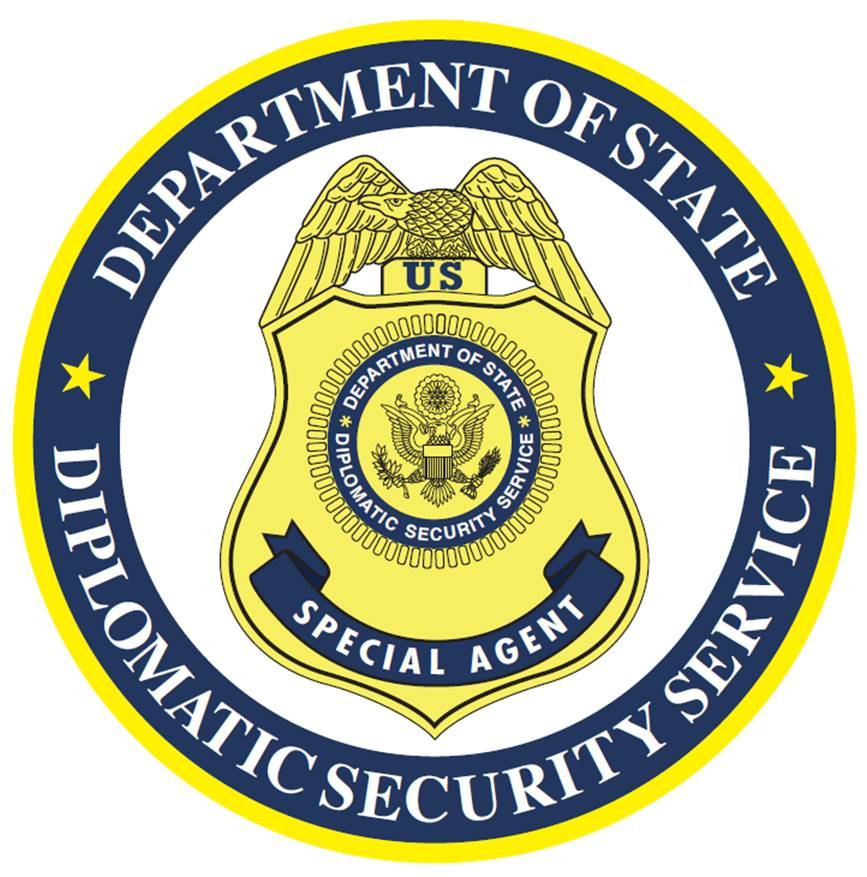
Seal of the Diplomatic Security Service / Formerly SY & Bureau of Secret Intelligence

Otto F. Otepka (May 6, 1915 – March 20, 2010) was a Deputy Director of the United States State Department's Office of Security in the late 1950s and early 1960s. He was fired as the State Department's chief security evaluations officer on November 5, 1963; he had furnished classified files to the United States Senate Subcommittee on Internal Security. Otepka was later appointed by Richard Nixon to a position on the Subversive Activities Control Board; he retired in 1972.

== Background ==
Otepka was born in Chicago in 1915, and graduated from the Columbus School of Law. He served in the US Navy during World War II.

== Career ==
Otepka was a Deputy Director of the United States State Department's Office of Security in the late 1950s and early 1960s. This was at the beginning of the Eisenhower Administration and Otepka's "Evaluations" section was faced with Senator Joseph McCarthy who was at the height of his power and making accusations that Communists and Communist sympathizers had infiltrated the U.S. Army and U.S. Department of State. Otepka was assisted by another newcomer to the State Department, William L. Uanna, who would soon head up "Physical Security" at State. Otepka, Uanna and R. W. Scott McLeod, another newcomer in Security at State, were mentioned in a 1954 article in The Reporter entitled "Big Brother at Foggy Bottom." The article describes how the State Department implemented Eisenhower's answer to McCarthy - Executive Order 10450 - and the reaction to it by State's employees.

The Office of Security was often simply known as "SY" and in the 1980s became the Diplomatic Security Service. Otepka was in charge of vetting clearances for the State Department, and he gained public attention when he was sidelined and then later fired by Secretary of State Dean Rusk. Otepka claimed he was punished for not clearing names proposed by the Kennedy administration for employment in the State Department. Some of these names had previously been banned during the Eisenhower administration, according to at least one source. Also, investigative journalist Clark Mollenhoff detailed the Otepka story in his 1965 book Despoilers of Democracy. Mollenhoff noted that Otepka was punished and subjected to illegal surveillance for giving testimony to Congress about security procedures at the State Department, as much as for his concern about the rampant use of emergency clearances by the Kennedy administration. Two officers, including Deputy Assistant Secretary John F. Reilly, perjured themselves before the Senate Internal Security Subcommittee and had to resign in November 1963. However, Senate efforts notwithstanding, Otto Otepka was relegated to a meaningless position before his termination. So were some of his colleagues who had backed his efforts.

By the late 1960s, there was a Congressional hearing into the dismissal of Otepka but in the end Otepka was never returned to his previous station.

In the 2021 Documentary, JFK Revisited: Through the Looking Glass, they mention Otto Otepka, and referred to him as an intelligence officer at the State Department. He, according to this documentary, was investigating Lee Harvey Oswald prior to the assassination of President John F. Kennedy.

In 1959 Lee Harvey Oswald "defected" to the Soviet Union. "The Warren Commission pushed the idea that Oswald was a staunch communist," citing the 1959 defection.

"When any American went to Russia and renounced their American citizenship and subsequently changed his mind, and wanted to come back to his country, upon his return to the US, there was a thorough debriefing by the CIA. With one exception...Oswald."

"That smacks of an intelligence relationship."

Meanwhile at the State Department, "Otto Otepka had noticed the marked increase of the number of Americans defecting to Russia at the time. Otepka also noted that some of them came from the military. He therefore suspected that some of these men were fake defectors. They had been assigned by the CIA to garner intelligence behind the iron curtain."

"Otepka sent a letter to the CIA asking which ones were real and which were their agents? Oswald was one of the names on Otepka's list."

Otepka's request was forwarded to James Jesus Angleton, Chief of Counterintelligence at CIA. According to this documentary, Angleton instructed there be no research done on Oswald. But, Otepka continued to work on the Oswald case.

"What is really interesting is that Otepka was really interested in Oswald before the assassination of President Kennedy. Otepka actually had a study of these defectors in his safe at the State Department. Well, things got worse. His office not only bugged but they planted people in his office to spy on him. They started putting confidential documents in his burn-bag and then trying to blame him, saying he's burning confidential documents. The guy's gone wacko."

"As a result, he was formally removed from the State Department on November 5, 1963, just 17 days before the assassination of President John F. Kennedy. So, you will not see Otto Otepka's name in the Warren Report. And he was not called as a witness for that body."

In March 1969, Otepka was appointed by Richard Nixon to a position on the Subversive Activities Control Board. After some difficult Senate confirmation hearings, the Senate confirmed his position.

Otepka retired in 1972 and moved to Cape Coral, Florida, in 1975. He was a member of the Association of Former Intelligence Officers.

== Bibliography ==
Books by other authors

- Gill, William J.The Ordeal of Otto Otepka. New Rochelle, New York: Arlington House, 1969.
- Mollenhoff, Clark R. Despoilers of Democracy. New York, New York: Doubleday, 1965.
