= Dignitary protection =

Protection provided by the Secret Service

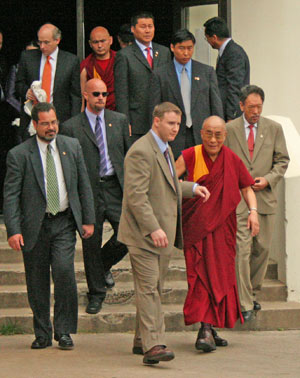
DSS agents escort the Dalai Lama. Houston, Texas, May 1, 2007.

Dignitary protection services are most often provided by either the United States Secret Service or the US Department of State’s Diplomatic Security Service. Contrary to other VIP close protection full-time jobs, dignitary protection most often is a temporary assignment, security detail is usually required to interact with foreign protective security officers, who come along with dignitaries.

Executive protection, also known as close protection, and/or Dignitary protection is a specialized security service focused on safeguarding individuals or groups who are exposed to elevated personal risk due to their position, wealth, or other factors. The core objectives of executive protection include:

1. Prevention of Harm
2. Protection of Life
3. Maintaining Dignity and Privacy
4. Facilitating the Protectee's Schedule
5. Building Maintaining Trust
6. Legal and Ethical Compliance
7. Risk Mitigation

While many may interchange Executive Protection with the term Bodyguard Executive Protection Professionals are highly trained individuals who do not rely on size and presence as a deterrence. Generally a Bodyguard is associated with movie stars, signers, athletes and other performers who have similar yet different threats than a dignitary or corporate protectees.

Corporate Executive Protection aligns more with United States Secret Service and Diplomatic Security Service protocols.

== Secret Service ==
In addition to US government protectees (the president and other members of the Cabinet), the Secret Service protects visiting heads of state.

== Diplomatic Security Service (DSS) ==
In addition to US government protectees (the Secretary of State, the ambassador to the United Nations), the Diplomatic Security Service (DSS) protects foreign dignitaries who are not heads of state, essentially everyone else.

In recent years DSS agents have also protected foreign leaders in their own country. This includes the president of Liberia, and the president of Afghanistan.

== See also ==
- Executive protection, similar role in the private sector
- Board of Executive Protection Professionals (BEPP)
