= Mobile Security Deployments =

Police unit of the US State Department

Office of Mobile Security Deployments
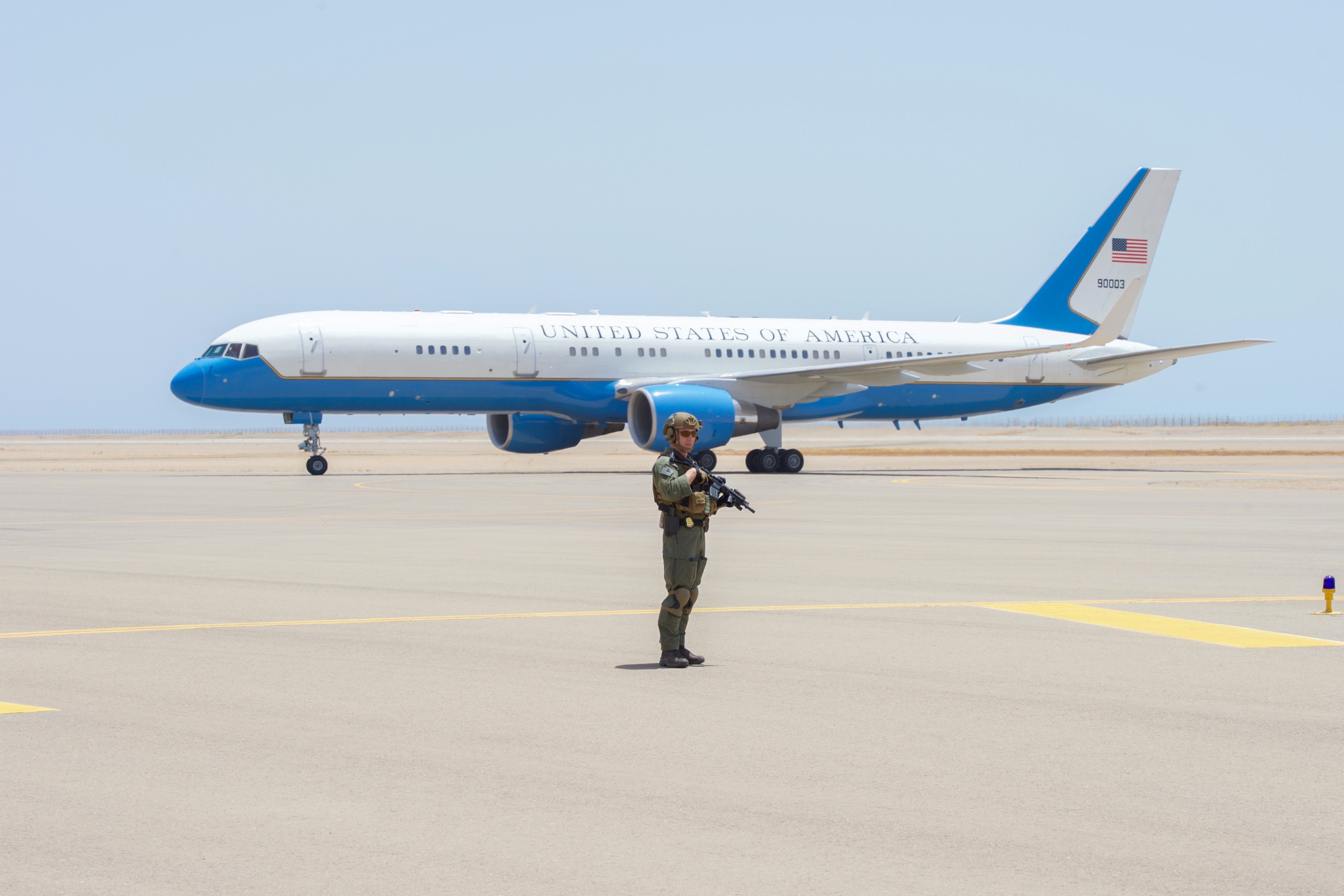
- MSD protecting Secretary of State John Kerry in Saudi Arabia in 2016
- Active: 1985–present
- Country: United States
- Agency: Diplomatic Security Service
- Type: Police tactical unit
- Operations jurisdiction: National; International
- Part of: Directorate of the Deputy Assistant Secretary and Assistant Director of Training
- Headquarters: Dunn Loring, Virginia
- Abbreviation: MSD

Structure
- Special Agents: 69
- Teams: 13

Website
- Official website

Mobile Security Deployments (MSD) is a small specialized tactical unit within the Diplomatic Security Service (DSS) of the United States Department of State. The MSD provides U.S. embassies and consulates with security support, protects the secretary of state and other U.S. officials, including domestically as well as visiting foreign officials, and also provides security training at U.S embassies and consulates.

The majority of its operations are overseas with only ten percent conducted in the United States. The unit was formed in 1985 and c. 2002 was renamed Mobile Security Deployments from Mobile Security Division.

== Overview ==
MSD is composed of specially trained special agents that typically operate in high-threat environments with little outside support.

Their assignment is the protection of members of the U.S. federal government overseas, particularly at U.S. embassies and consulates. Fighting kidnapping and terrorism are part of their duties, as well as protection and evacuation of U.S. citizens out of crisis areas and training of personnel in foreign countries.

MSD also augments other DSS agents in high-threat or high-profile protection missions.

MSD is based in Dunn Loring, Virginia and consists of a headquarters element, tactical medical staff, training cadre, logistic staff, and thirteen operational teams with six agents each.

The team's three primary missions are:

- Mobile Training Teams (MTT), hold classes for local law enforcement at embassies and consulates, U.S. Marine Corps Security Guards (MSG) and select foreign personnel.
- Security Support Teams (SST) are trained for counterattacks on U.S. embassies or threats against diplomatic personnel. SSTs react to international crises or threats on short notice in order to enhance and ensure security of U.S. Department of State personnel and facilities, and assist in evacuations if necessary.
- Tactical Support Teams (TST) were established in the 1990s and are typically assigned as a heavily armed reaction force in support of the protective service details assigned to high-profile protectees, such as the secretary of state. TSTs typically shadow such protective details.

MSD cooperates closely with other federal agencies, such as the Secret Service, the Fleet Antiterrorism Security Teams of the United States Marine Corps, the Federal Bureau of Investigation and local law enforcement agencies, both domestic and foreign.

== Selection and training ==
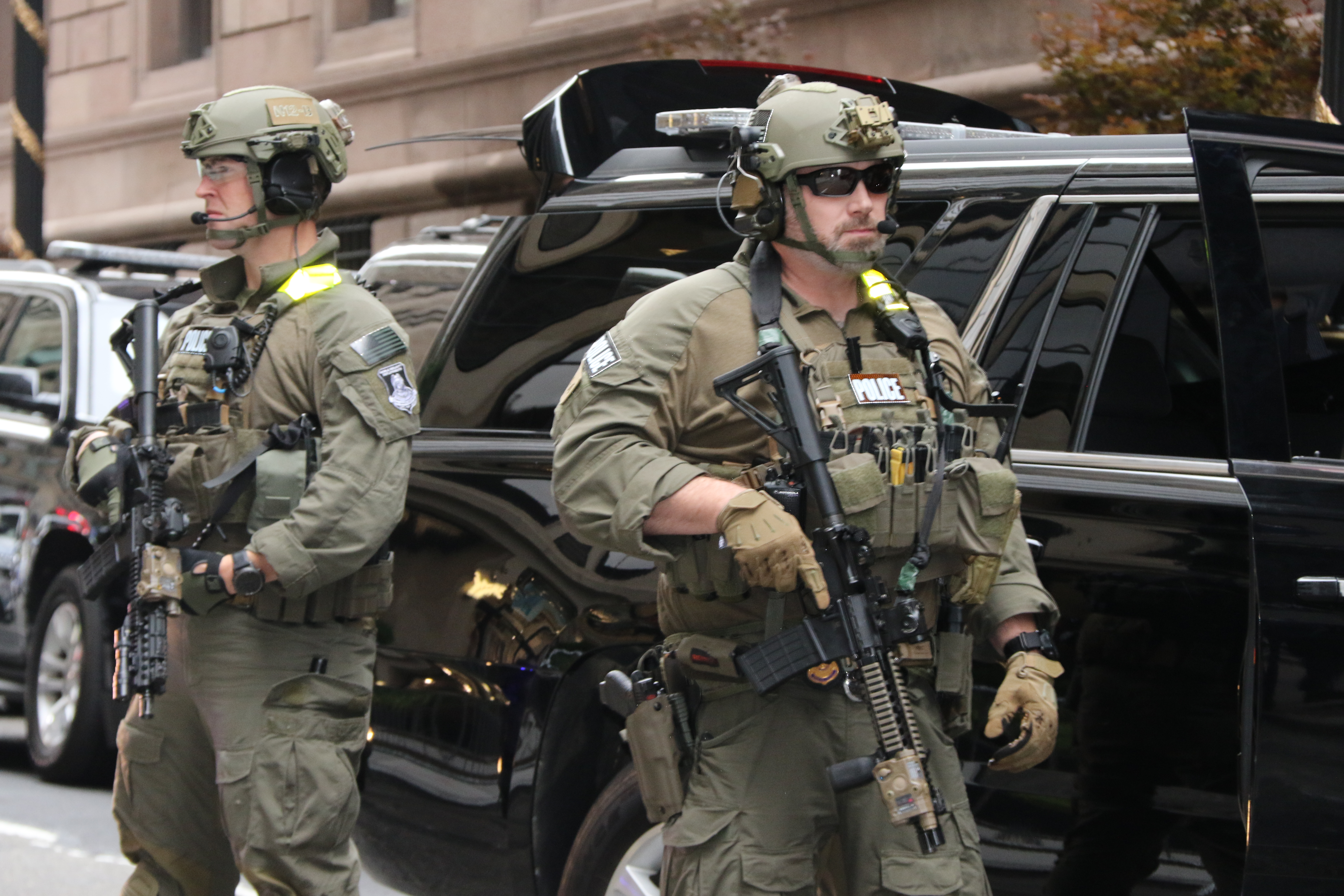
MSD protecting Secretary of State Mike Pompeo in New York in 2018

MSD agents are selected from DSS agents who voluntarily want to join the specialized unit. These agents are expected to maintain more stringent shooting standards than their peers in DS. Beginning with an initial assessment, the training duration is six months and is held in and around the Diplomatic Security Training Center (DSTC) in Northern Virginia and West Virginia. The curriculum is based upon advanced weapon handling and Close Quarters Battle (CQB) tactics, counter-terror and off-road car handling, advanced navigation, precision shooting, first aid and tactics. The training culminates in an elaborate detention and personal security scenario. Throughout their three-year tour at MSD, agents continue to train at DS schools, and specialized tactics schools all over the United States. MSD also participates in joint military exercises to ensure interoperability in many places where the U.S. Department of State and U.S. Military work together. Upon completion of their tour, MSD agents return to DSS posts in the U.S. and overseas.

== Air capability ==
MSD trains in helicopter operations, but does not have its own dedicated air assets. Rather, MSD uses the U.S. Department of State's globally deployed contract air assets as well as U.S. military air in certain theatres.

== Equipment ==
Garments, weapons and communication devices of the MSD are always state of the art. MSD uniforms are tailored to the mission, and may comprise a Crye Precision or other battle dress uniform (BDU), or low-profile civilian clothing, the latter of which is more commonly used in SST and MTT missions. MSD agents use advanced combat helmets, ballistic protective glasses such as Oakleys, body armor, gas masks, radio transceivers with headphones, tactical first aid kits, ballistic vests, various hydration systems, current-generation night vision goggles and GPS handheld devices such as Garmin 60cx, and other geolocation equipment. MSD agents stay current in military and DSS communications systems in order to remain interoperable with other agencies and military units. Since 2009, MSD has made equipment upgrades based on experiences in the Middle East.

== Weaponry ==
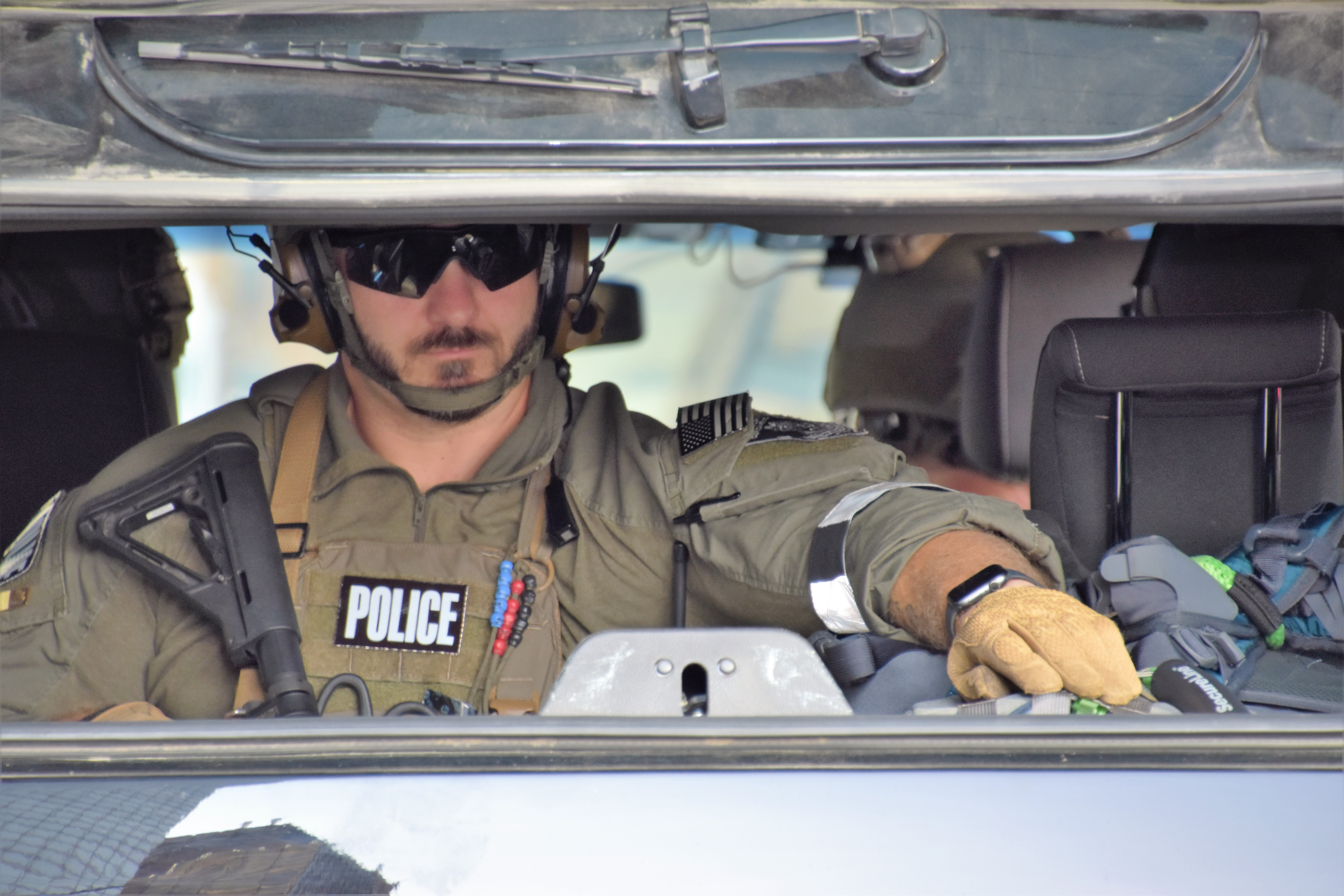
A MSD special agent in a motorcade protecting Secretary of State Mike Pompeo in New York in 2019

MSD's primary rifle is the Mk18 type 2 carbine with the Aimpoint T-1 Micro combat optic and AN/PEQ-15 ATPIAL. MSD also qualifies with the Colt submachine gun, different Heckler & Koch MP5 submachine gun variants, Remington 870 shotguns while SIG Sauer, Glock and Beretta pistols are assigned as sidearms.

MSD agents are trained to use and deploy with U.S. Military weapons, including the M249, M240, and M2 machine guns, M203 and Mk 19 grenade launchers, and precision fire rifles such as the Mk11 Mod 1 and MK 12 SPR.

MSD agents are also trained to use less-than-lethal weaponry include OC, or pepper spray, extendable batons and stun grenades.

== Assignments ==
Diplomatic Security MSD agents were involved in Bosnia and Liberia protecting U.S. diplomatic missions and arresting terrorists, as well as the investigation of terrorists bombings in a United States Army barracks in Dhahran, Saudi Arabia in 1996 and the 1998 United States embassy bombings in Tanzania and Kenya. More recent missions have included operations in Iraq, Afghanistan, Haiti, Pakistan, Jamaica, and in various other countries conducting MTTs such as Mexico.

On May 16, 2019, agents from multiple teams entered the Venezuelan embassy in Washington, DC at the request of the Venezuelan interim president, Juan Guaido, to remove American citizens who had barricaded themselves inside the embassy for thirty-seven days to prevent the interim government from moving in.

== See also ==
- Bureau of Diplomatic Security (DS)
- FBI Hostage Rescue Team (HRT)
- Secret Service Counter Assault Team (CAT)
- Immigration and Customs Enforcement Special Response Team (SRT)
- SWAT
