= Carlos Matus (diplomat) =

American diplomat

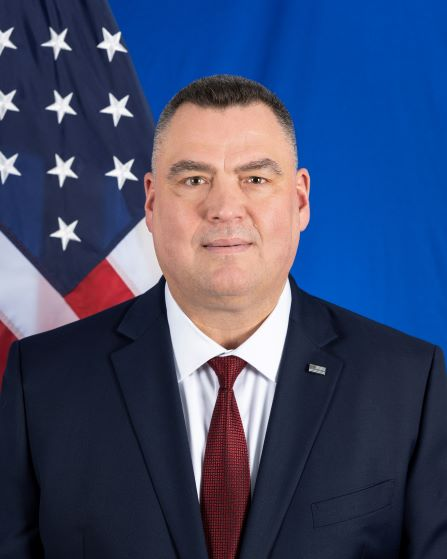

Assistant Secretary of State for Diplomatic Security Acting
- In office January 20, 2025 – May 30, 2025
- President: Donald Trump
- Preceded by: Gentry O. Smith
- Succeeded by: Paul R. Houston

Principal Deputy Assistant Secretary and Director of the Department of State's Diplomatic Security Service (DSS)
- In office September 13, 2021 – June 2, 2025
- President: Joe Biden

Personal details
- Born: Carlos F. Matus; 1970 (age 55–56) Oceanside, California, U.S.
- Education: Inter-American Defense College; University of Maryland; University of Salvator
- Profession: Special Agent
- Awards: Regional Security Officer (RO) of the Year for D Company

Carlos F. Matus (born 1970) is an American diplomat at the Bureau of Diplomatic Security (DS) who served until May 2025 as the principal deputy assistant secretary of state and director of the Diplomatic Security Service (DSS). The DS is a law enforcement security arm of the State Department which leads security and law enforcement focusing on safeguard national security interests. Matus has served over thirty-seven years as a career member in the Senior Foreign Service (SFS.) From 2004 to 2017, Carlos Matus was appointed as a regional security officer (RSO) at the United States Embassy of Kabul, Afghanistan. From 2018 to 2019, Carlos Matus served as the deputy regional director for contingency operations focusing on Afghanistan before working at the Office of Protective Intelligence Investigations. From 2019 to 2020, Carlos Matus served as the deputy assist secretary for threat investigations and analysis. Matus currently serves as a liaison between the Department of Justice and DSS.

== Early life and education ==
Carlos Matus received a master's degree in National Defense from Inter-American Defense College and a master's in security at the University of Maryland. Matus then continued his education to receive his third major from Buenos Aires where he graduated from University of Salvador.

== Career ==
Matus began his career at the Washington Field Office for DS where he was assigned to defending the U.S. Embassies located in Tegucigalpa, Honduras and La Paz, Bolivia until 1993. In 1995, Matus returned to Washington D.C. to conduct criminal investigations for passport fraud until 1997. Matus's first assignment by State Department as shift leader for United States Secretary of State for Madeleine K. Albright as her personal protection detail (or protective service detachment) at the Miami field office.

In 2018, Carlos Matus received two awards from the U.S. Marine Corps as regional security officer (RSO) of the year for D Company. Matus participated in numerous projects such as ensuring organization, policy, plans, and programs for Marine Corps as well as advising the secretary of defense, the National Security Council, the Office of Inspector General at United States Department of Justice (DOJ), and the secretary of the Navy's counterterrorism, counterintelligence and counterinsurgency operations.

Matus was selected during the FY2023 Presidential Rank Rewards (PRA) and nominated as one of the 64 Senior Foreign Service members by the State Department and President of the United States. Matus was acknowledged for his efforts to contributions within field of foreign affairs, public diplomacy and international development. Carlos Matus Senior Foreign Service (SFS) awards from Joe Biden and Antony Blinken during December 2023.

== See also ==
- Diplomatic Security Service (DSS)
- Bureau of Diplomatic Security
- United States State Department
- Department of Justice (DOJ)
