= Inman Report =

The Inman Report, formally known as the Report of the Secretary of State's Advisory Panel on Overseas Security, was a report released in 1985 in response to the Marine barracks bombing and the April 1983 US Embassy bombing in Beirut, Lebanon. The report is usually known by the name of its chairman, Admiral Bobby Ray Inman, USN (Ret.)

The report recommended a range of security improvements, including increased setback between embassies and public streets. It also recommended a major building program to improve security in existing embassies, and build new embassies to replace those that could not meet security standards. A direct result from the Report was the creation of the Bureau of Diplomatic Security and the Diplomatic Security Service within the U.S. State Department.

== Background ==
The early 1980s experienced a wave of terrorist attacks on diplomatic premises. On April 18, 1983, a mass bombing resulted in the death of 63 people, including 18 Americans, and the injuring of 120 people in an attack by Islamic Jihad on the U.S. Embassy in Beirut. On December 12, 1983, another attack was targeted towards the United States in Kuwait City, which caused five deaths with a dump truck filled with plastic explosives. Beirut experienced a second attack on September 20, 1984. This time a truck bomb killed 24 people, including two Americans and injured an additional 21. These attacks prompted the United States to take a new perspective regarding the protection of diplomatic premises.

After several attacks in the Middle East, the Inman Report was created by the Advisory Panel on Overseas Security under the chairmanship of Admiral Bobby Ray Inman. In June 1985, the Inman Report was released and focused upon the issues of the United States' diplomatic business. The report issued a seven-year plan that initiated the replacement of 126 posts (out of 262) with more secure standards such as walled compounds, new security standards, minimums for setbacks, maximums for windows and additional architectural enhancements. Not only did it include the alteration of posts, a new construction of at-risk missions was created. The Inman Report called for advanced formation of the Diplomatic Security Service (DS), which looked to oversee security protection aspects at all overseas operations regarding the United States.

== Building program inferences ==
The necessity for a building program was due to the threat factors towards the United States diplomatic facilities in other countries. The program implements an increase in basic security standards to protect against terrorism. The Panel was able to draw some general conclusions based on the concern of these threats:

- The United States must have complete control of their facilities overseas
- To avoid penetration and assault, the location of these buildings is of great importance. It is no longer an asset to be on the busiest, more popular street
- It is equally important to consider the collocation of these buildings as occupants whom the United States doesn't control or choose can pose a risk
- Modern electronic and audio technology can make it hard to safeguard important information; therefore, proximity to other buildings plays a key factor
- Many buildings cannot be upgraded so age, architecture, and the design of the building are a concern for the ability to defend penetration and assault
- The old approach to business must be overturned to promote a new approach for overseas construction and adequate funding for the program

While it is not certain that the terrorist attacks will diminish entirely, preventative inferences can be taken to reduce the risk of harm by updating and/or relocating those buildings.

== Budgeting of foreign buildings ==
As the Inman Report outlines the importance of improving its foreign buildings, the report requires there to be a shift from previous priorities and workloads concerning overseas buildings in order to implement the report's objectives. To accomplish this work effort a total of over 344 offices in 130 countries is needed. New methods are being implemented so appropriate actions can be taken in order for enhancements to be fulfilled accordingly. In response to the alteration of buildings, new methods for budgeting and funding must be put into place. This is the first step towards incorporating the Inman Report's standards on buildings.

Currently, the Department of State's budgeting procedures for foreign buildings has several weaknesses. Its present processes contribute to lengthy delays concerning the completion of building projects. These procedures can effect the decisions regarding funding and priorities based on the costs of each project instead of on security and other operational criteria. Consequently, the procedures that are currently put in place are compelling building projects to contend for funding against other non-investment plans in the budget. The procedures also decline flexible responses to temporary real estate opportunities that are quite common overseas.

As new facilities are required to contain particular specifications, and the amount of resources and production involved in the construction of the buildings are plentiful, a new funding approach must be created in order for the planned projects to be carried out effectively. The Capital Budgeting system will allow for greater flexibility, while forcing capital investments to vie for funding against day-to-day operations. The Department of State is required to seek approval from Congress to carry out the Capital Budgeting System for foreign buildings.
