= Leland B. Harrison =

American diplomat (1883–1951)

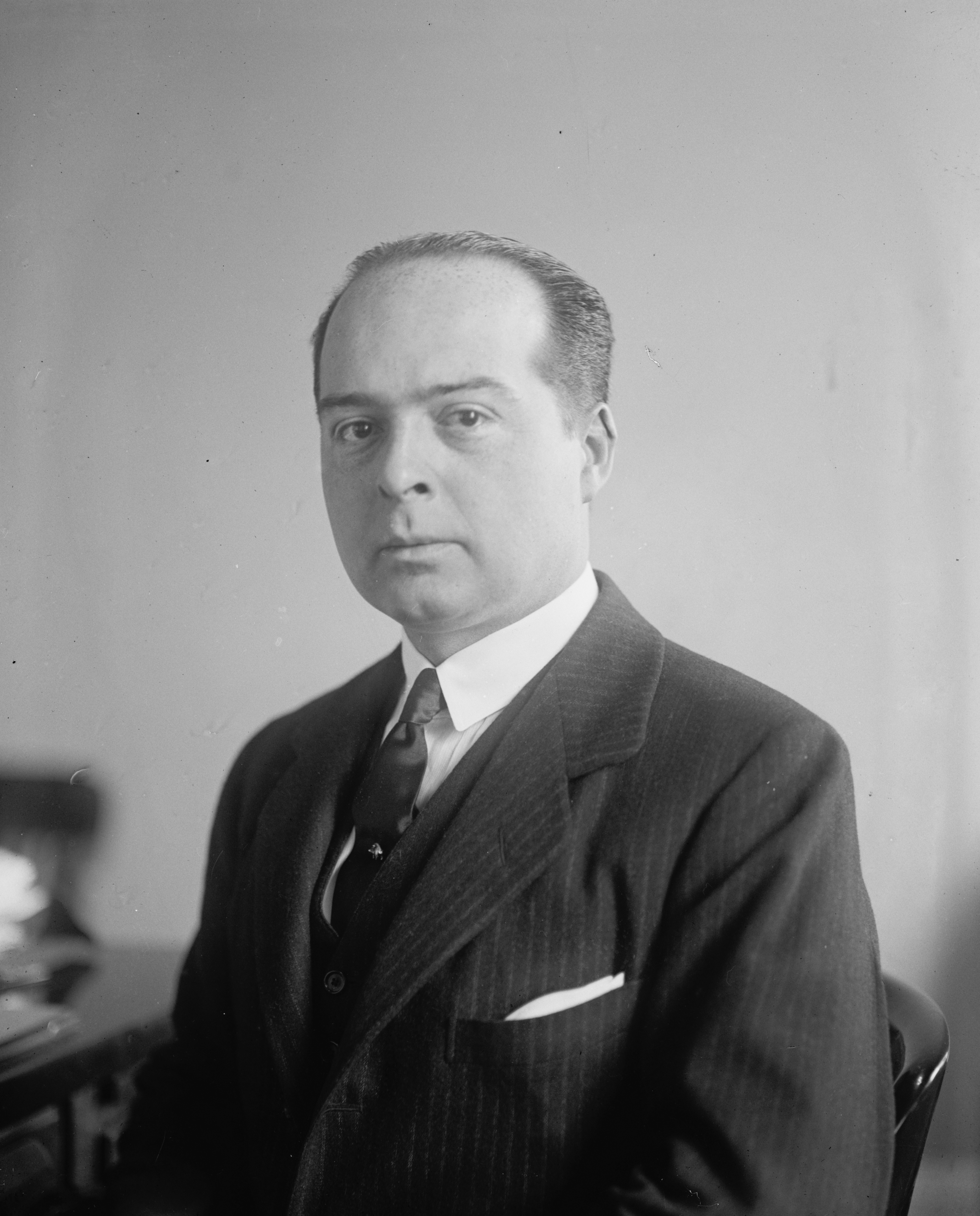

United States Minister to Switzerland
- In office September 10, 1937 – October 14, 1947
- President: Franklin D. Roosevelt; Harry S. Truman
- Preceded by: Hugh R. Wilson
- Succeeded by: John Carter Vincent

United States Minister to Romania
- In office July 24, 1935 – September 3, 1937
- President: Franklin D. Roosevelt
- Preceded by: Alvin M. Owsley
- Succeeded by: Franklin Mott Gunther

United States Minister to Uruguay
- In office April 11, 1930 – October 9, 1930
- President: Herbert Hoover
- Preceded by: Ulysses Grant-Smith
- Succeeded by: J. Butler Wright

United States Minister to Sweden
- In office May 31, 1927 – November 11, 1929
- President: Calvin Coolidge; Herbert Hoover
- Preceded by: Robert Woods Bliss
- Succeeded by: John Motley Morehead III

United States Assistant Secretary of State
- In office March 31, 1922 – June 30, 1924
- President: Warren G. Harding; Calvin Coolidge
- Preceded by: Fred Morris Dearing
- Succeeded by: Wilbur J. Carr

Personal details
- Born: April 25, 1883 New York City, New York, U.S.
- Died: June 6, 1951 (aged 68) Washington, D.C., U.S.
- Spouse: Anne C. Coleman (m. 1925)
- Education: Harvard College; Harvard Law School

Leland B. Harrison (April 25, 1883 – June 6, 1951) was a United States diplomat. He held several high appointments in the foreign service, most notably as U.S. minister to Switzerland throughout World War II.

== Family and education ==
The son of W. Henry Harrison and Helen (Skidmore) Harrison, he was educated at Eton College, Harvard College, and Harvard Law School.

== Career ==
After law school, Harrison became the private secretary of United States Ambassador to Japan Thomas J. O'Brien. He was appointed Third Secretary of the U.S. Embassy in Tokyo on June 10, 1908. He later filled posts in the United States embassies in Peking, London, and Bogotá. In 1918, he became diplomatic secretary of the American Commission to Negotiate Peace. He later became counselor of the U.S. Embassy in Paris.

In 1916 President Woodrow Wilson allowed Secretary of State Robert Lansing and Frank Polk quietly and informally to channel the flow of military and law enforcement material into the State Department's Bureau of Secret Intelligence (U-1), what is now known as the Diplomatic Security Service. The two men picked Leland Harrison "to take charge of the collection and examination of all information of a secret nature coming into the Department from various sources and also to direct the work of the agents specially employed for that purpose."

In 1921, Harrison moved to Washington, D.C. to become assistant to the Conference on the Limitation on Armament. On March 21, 1922, Harrison was named United States Assistant Secretary of State and he held this office from March 31, 1922, to June 30, 1924. In 1927, Harrison was named Minister to Sweden, a post he held from May 31, 1927, to November 11, 1929. He also headed the U.S. delegation to the International Telegraph Conference in Brussels in 1928. In 1929, he became Minister to Uruguay, holding this post from April 11, 1930, to October 9, 1930. He then resigned temporarily from the United States Foreign Service. A short time later, however, he returned to government service as chief of the International Relations Division of the United States Tariff Commission. On May 15, 1935, he was named Minister to Romania, serving there from July 24, 1935, to September 3, 1937.

=== Ambassador to Switzerland ===
He was then Minister to Switzerland from September 10, 1937, to October 14, 1947.

As Ambassador to Switzerland, Harrison was sympathetic to Jewish rescue and relief operations and worked closely with Gerhardt Riegner, the representative of the World Jewish Congress in Geneva and sent several reports regarding the murder of the Jews of Europe to the United States Department of State in Washington D.C.

He endorsed many of these reports as being credible and recommended action be taken to assist in the relief and rescue of Jews in Nazi-controlled territories.

== Personal life, retirement and death ==
He married Anne C. Coleman on June 27, 1925.

Harrison retired on February 29, 1948. After his death in June 1951, he was buried in the cemetery of the Church of St. James the Less in Philadelphia.

Government offices
Preceded by Fred Morris Dearing	United States Assistant Secretary of State; March 31, 1922 – June 30, 1924	Succeeded by Office abolished
Diplomatic posts
Preceded by Robert Woods Bliss	United States Ambassador to Sweden; May 31, 1927 – November 11, 1929	Succeeded by John Motley Morehead III
Preceded by Ulysses Grant-Smith	United States Ambassador to Uruguay; April 11, 1930 – October 9, 1930	Succeeded by J. Butler Wright
Preceded by Alvin M. Owsley	United States Ambassador to Romania; July 24, 1935 – September 3, 1937	Succeeded by Franklin Mott Gunther
Preceded by Hugh R. Wilson	United States Ambassador to Switzerland and Liechtenstein; September 10, 1937 – October 14, 1947	Succeeded by John Carter Vincent
