= Diplomatic Security Service =

US Department of State law enforcement agency

- Seal of the Diplomatic Security Service

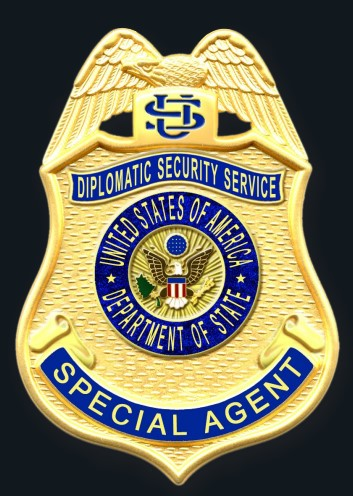
- DSS special agent badge
- Abbreviation: DSS

Agency overview
- Formed: 1916: Bureau of Secret Intelligence; 1945: Office of Security; 1985: Diplomatic Security Service

Jurisdictional structure
- Operations jurisdiction: United States

Operational structure
- Headquarters: Arlington, Virginia
- Agents: 2,200+ (Authorized) <2000 (2022)
- Assistant secretary responsible: Todd Wilcox, assistant secretary of state for diplomatic security
- Agency executives: Nicholas Collura, director of the Diplomatic Security Service
- Parent agency: Bureau of Diplomatic Security of the United States Department of State
- Tactical units: Mobile Security Deployments

Facilities
- Field offices: 8
- Resident offices: 20
- Overseas offices: 285

Website
- diplomaticsecurity.state.gov

The Diplomatic Security Service (DSS) is the principal law enforcement and security agency of the United States Department of State (DOS). Its primary mission is to protect diplomatic assets, personnel, and information, and combat transnational crimes connected to visa and passport fraud. DSS also conducts counterterrorism, counterintelligence, cybersecurity and criminal investigations domestically and abroad.

Originating in diplomatic security measures implemented during the First World War, DSS was formally established in 1985 following the deadly 1983 bombings of the U.S. embassy and Marine barracks in Beirut, Lebanon. It is the leading U.S. law enforcement agency abroad and the most widely deployed in the world, protecting 275 U.S. diplomatic missions in over 170 countries and in more than thirty U.S. cities. As employees of the U.S. State Department, DSS special agents are unique in U.S. federal law enforcement for also being members of the Foreign Service.

The service's most visible activity is providing security to the U.S. secretary of state, the U.S. ambassador to the United Nations, and other senior diplomats. As part of its duty to provide a safe and secure environment for U.S. diplomacy, DSS also protects foreign dignitaries visiting the United States, advises U.S. ambassadors on security matters, and manages security programs for international events, often in cooperation with domestic and foreign counterparts.

== Overview ==
While best known for its security role, DSS is a full-fledged law enforcement agency that conducts international criminal investigations, threat analysis, counterterrorism, counterintelligence, security technology, cybersecurity, and investigations into international human trafficking.

The agency employs over 2,500 Foreign Service specialists, including special agents, security engineering officers, security technical specialists, and diplomatic couriers.

DSS agents are federal agents with the power to arrest, carry firearms, serve arrest warrants, and perform other law enforcement activities.

Whereas most U.S. federal law enforcement agents are members of the federal civil service, the majority of DSS special agents are both Foreign Service specialists and law enforcement officers. DSS agents are unique in being required to serve multiple-year tours abroad as a condition of employment.

When not on an overseas assignment, agents serve at DSS headquarters in Arlington, Virginia, or in one of its field or resident offices nationwide.

A small percentage of DSS special agents are members of the State Department's civil service and are not mandated to serve tours overseas; they instead focus on criminal investigations and dignitary protection within the United States.

When assigned to domestic field offices, DSS special agents investigate transnational crimes, passport fraud and visa fraud, and protect visiting foreign dignitaries. They also investigate the activities of foreign intelligence agencies that are focused on the Department of State, assist in apprehending fugitives that have fled the United States, and conduct background checks on State Department employees, applicants, and contractors.

DSS special agents perform law enforcement duties at U.S. missions, provide security assistance, protect senior diplomats, and perform other roles as needed. The ranking DSS special agent at an embassy or consulate holds the title of regional security officer (RSO) and is often known as the "security attaché."

== History ==
The origins of DSS go back to the early stages of the First World War, when the United States, which sought to maintain its neutrality, found itself the target of espionage, sabotage and passport fraud.

German and Austrian spies were known to be conducting operations in New York City using forged or stolen identity papers. In late 1915, Secretary of State Robert Lansing recommended creating an international law enforcement task force within the Department of State to investigate such crimes.

=== Bureau of Secret Intelligence ===
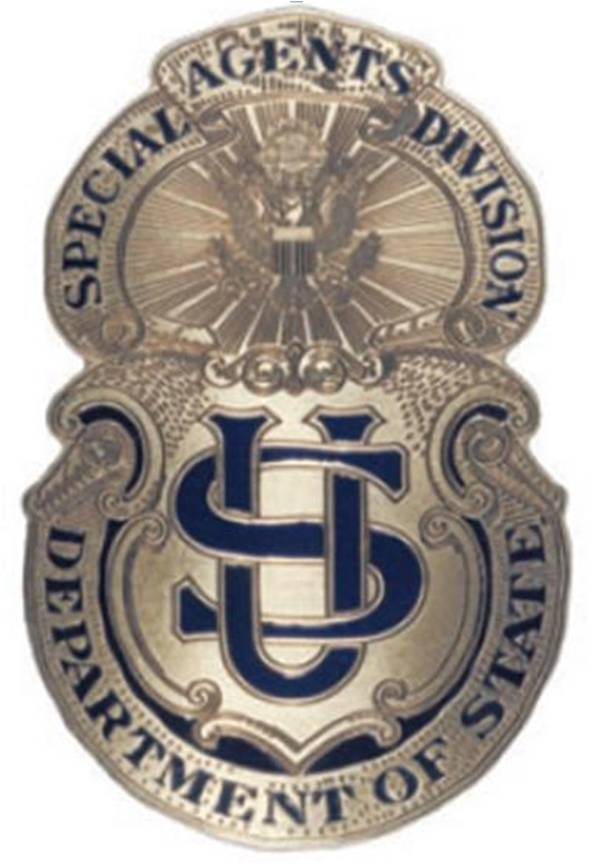
1916 badge of the Bureau of Secret Intelligence

When his suggestion failed to gain support, on April 4, 1916, Secretary Lansing, with the authorization of President Woodrow Wilson, created his own task force, the Bureau of Secret Intelligence, which he dubbed "the Secret Service of the Department of State." An off-the-books adjunct to the Division of Information, the Bureau was also known as the Office of the Chief Special Agent, possibly to disguise its sensitive operations.

Supported by confidential funds from Secretary Lansing's office, this small force was composed of agents from the U.S. Secret Service, who specialized in counterfeit currency, and agents of the U.S. Postal Inspection Service (USPIS), which had the best forensic laboratory in the country.

The agents were overseen by a junior Foreign Service officer, Leland Harrison. Tasked primarily with counterespionage and counterintelligence, the team also investigated passport fraud, protected U.S. and foreign diplomats on U.S. soil, and processed threat reports from overseas posts. Following U.S. entry into the war, the Bureau also interned and exchanged diplomatic officials of enemy powers.

After the war ended, Congress passed laws requiring American citizens to return with passports and resident aliens to enter with visas. State Department agents began investigating subsequent instances of passport and visa fraud. Around this same time State Department agents began protecting distinguished visitors to the United States.

By the 1920s, the chief special agent no longer reported his office's activities directly to the Secretary of State, instead answering to the assistant secretary of state for administration. Within the next two decades major passport fraud activities were detected and neutralized worldwide, often involving both Communists and Nazis.

=== Office of Security ===
During World War II, State Department agents were once again involved in interning and exchanging diplomatic officials of enemy powers. Around this time, the chief special agent's office became known as SY (short for Office of Security), which in turn was under the Administration Bureau of the Management Undersecretary. After World War II, SY began expanding its presence overseas, with numerous Regional Security Officer (RSO) positions created in overseas posts.

In 1961, Otto Otepka, then a deputy director of SY, brought to the attention of the U.S. Senate Internal Security Subcommittee deficiencies in the State Department clearance process.

The allegations were traced all the way up to then secretary of state Dean Rusk. Despite multiple awards, appeals from multiple U.S. Senators and not backing down, Secretary Rusk removed Otepka from his position and ultimately unceremoniously fired him.

Starting sometime after World War II, SY began regularly protecting visiting heads of state, but it had done so sporadically since the 1930s. Before his departure in 1947, SY director Bannerman began codifying procedures for overseas security. This process continued in the late 1940s, with a number of RSO positions being created.

From that time and through the early 1970s, the number of agents remained relatively small, hovering around 300, with more than half of these serving overseas at any given time. The April 1983 U.S. embassy bombing was a catharsis for the State Department, which would transform SY into the newly created Diplomatic Security Service, part of the Bureau of Diplomatic Security.

=== Diplomatic Security Service ===
Congress formed a commission headed by Admiral Bobby Ray Inman to look into the bombings of U.S. diplomatic facilities in Beirut. The resultant Inman Report recommended that security at the State Department needed to be elevated to a higher priority.

In 1985, Congress created the Bureau of Diplomatic Security (DS), headed by the assistant secretary of state for diplomatic security, and the Diplomatic Security Service (DSS), headed by the Director of DSS, who is subordinate to the assistant secretary of state for diplomatic security. However, DSS is the federal law enforcement agency, and not the Bureau of Diplomatic Security (DS).

The director of DSS is an active DSS agent who also serves as a principal deputy assistant secretary of state (PDAS), as they are senior to the various assistant directors of diplomatic security who hold positions equivalent to deputy assistant secretary of state (DAS).

The PDAS designation signifies the DSS director's preeminence over the other DASs within DSS, while at the same time signifying their position under the assistant secretary of state for diplomatic security.

The first assistant secretaries of state for diplomatic security were senior Foreign Service officers, while the last several have been retired senior DSS special agents. With the creation of DSS, its ranks grew to well over 1,000 agents. However, by the mid-1990s, in the wake of wider budget cutbacks passed by Congress, the department trimmed the budget of DSS to the point where it had dwindled to a little over 600 agents.

Although DSS was by then a bureau within the State Department, the vast majority of RSOs overseas continued to report to the administration officer. This changed in 1999, as fallout from the East Africa embassy bombings of 1998.

The terse message from the undersecretary of state for management announcing the immediate change made it clear that this action was against his best judgment and insinuated that it was done because then Secretary of State Madeleine Albright ordered it. This change stripped DSS from under administration officers and placed the RSO directly under the deputy chief of mission (DCM) in the chain of command at an embassy.

== Structure and organization ==
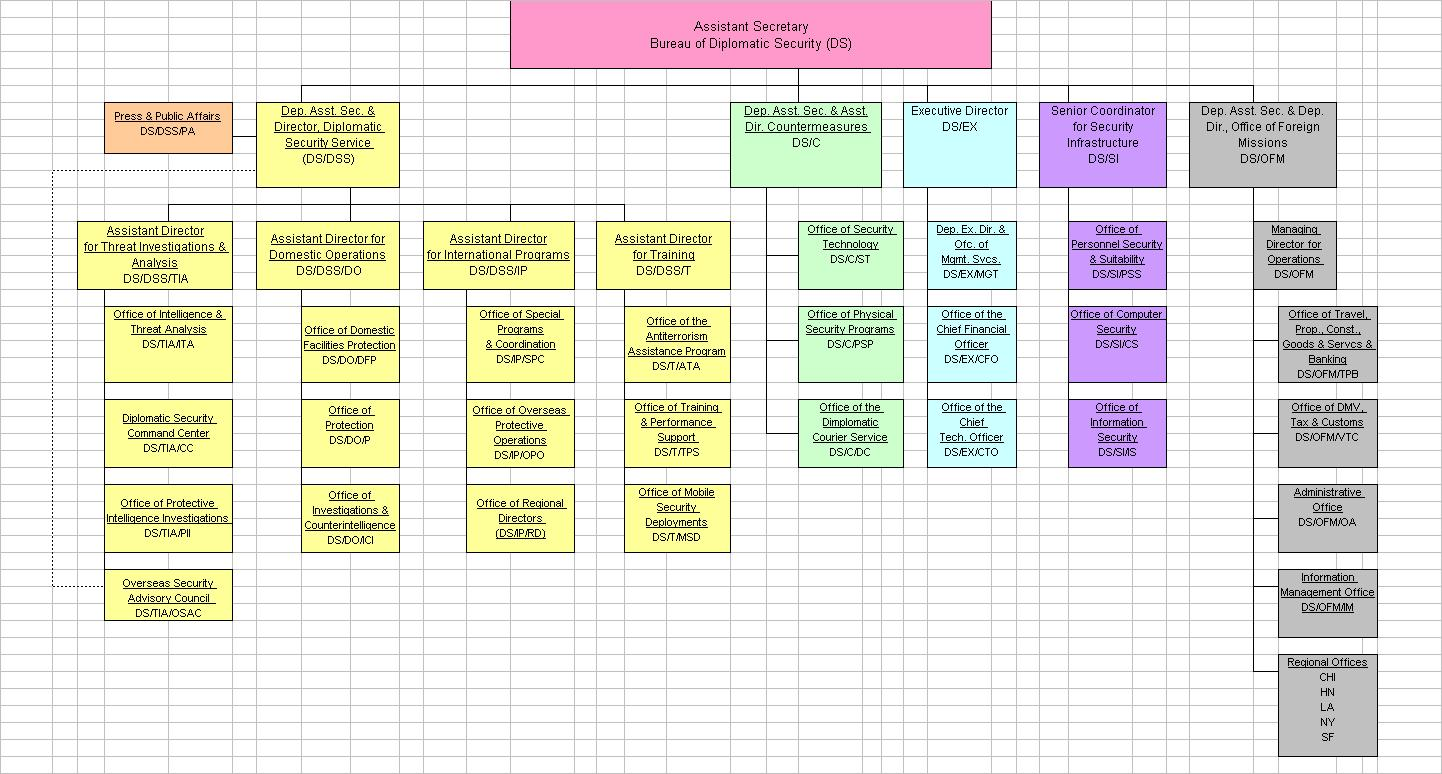
Bureau (DS) organizational chart

Outside the Department of State, there is much confusion about the relationship between the Bureau of Diplomatic Security (DS) and the Diplomatic Security Service (DSS).

DS oversees all security-related matters at the Department of State, which includes security at U.S. embassies and consulates. DS has approximately 40,000 employees, of whom roughly 2,500 are Foreign Service specialists within DSS.

As such, DSS is the primary mechanism by which the Bureau of Diplomatic Security accomplishes its law enforcement (criminal investigative) and security missions.

The Bureau of Diplomatic Security is headed by the assistant secretary of state for diplomatic security, who in turn is served by several deputy assistant secretaries (DAS). The principal deputy assistant secretary (PDAS) is the director of the Diplomatic Security Service (DSS) and is an active DSS special agent.

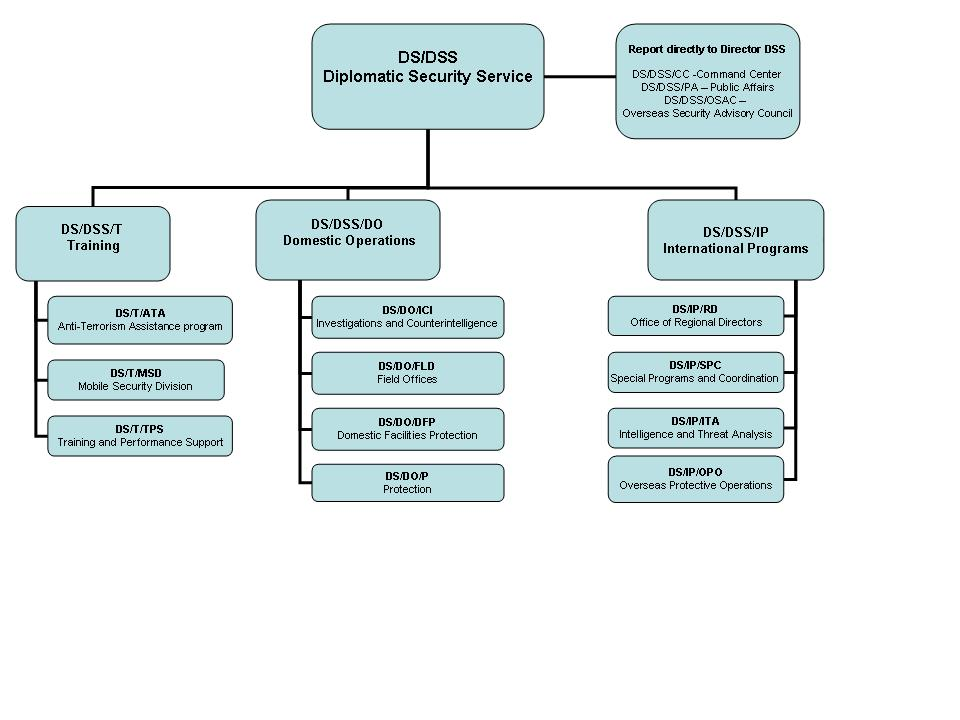
DSS organizational chart

All employees who work for Bureau of Diplomatic Security, including those of DSS, are referred to as DS employees. DSS special agents are frequently assigned to positions within DSS, but occasionally work outside of their bureau structure.

For example, while assigned overseas, Department of State employees are evaluated by their superiors at the embassy or consulate to which they are assigned. In the case of DSS agents, the RSO (senior special agent at post) is rated by the deputy chief of mission and reviewed by the chief of mission (ambassador). DSS hierarchy has no input on the agent's evaluation, though it does provide instructions to the agent.

== Protection mission ==
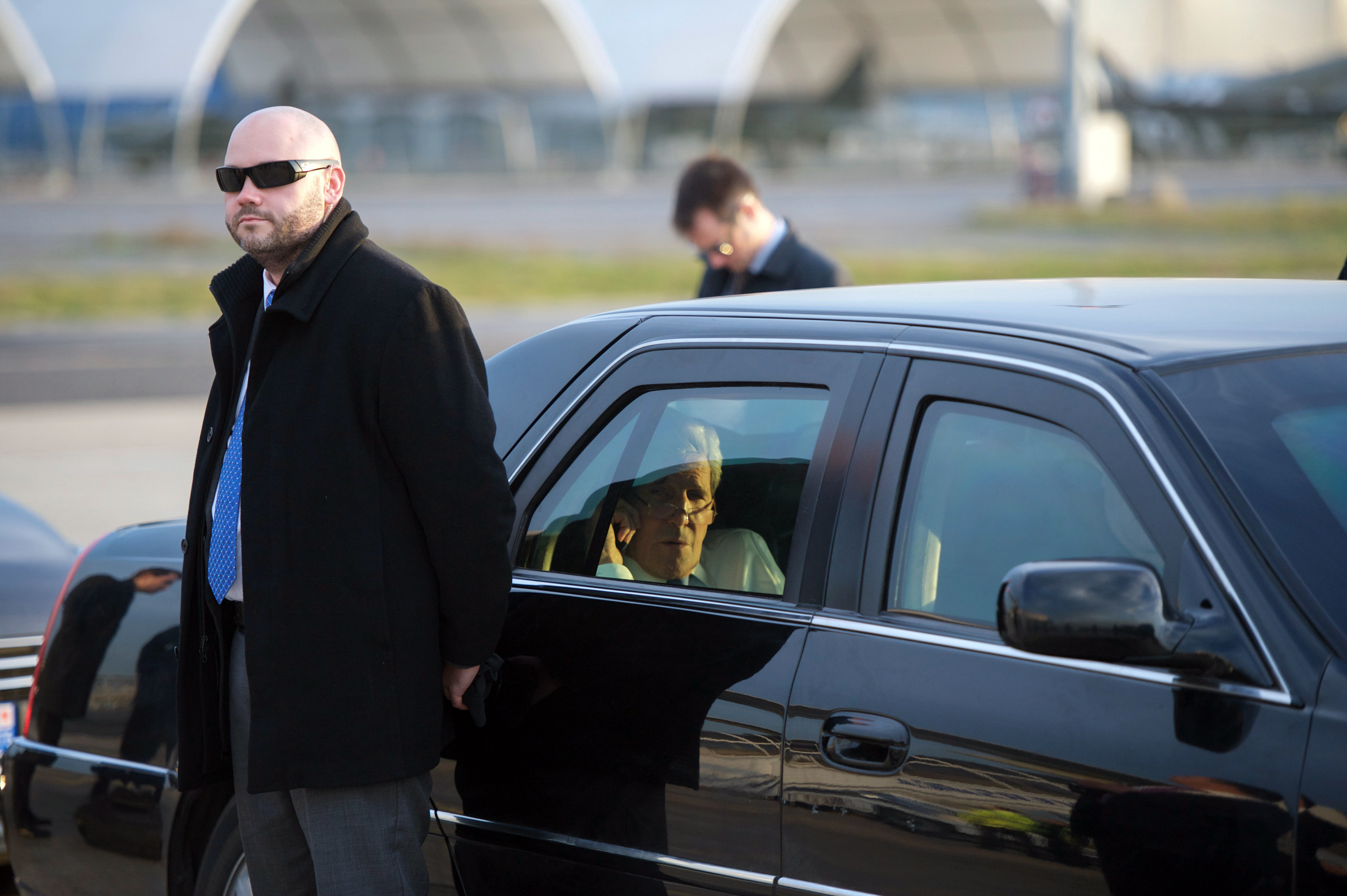
A DSS special agent stands watch as Secretary of State Kerry makes a telephone call.

DSS is best identified with its protection assignments around the globe. The largest permanent dignitary protection detail carried out by DSS agents is for the United States secretary of state. The ambassador to the United Nations also has a protection detail.

Some U.S. ambassadors receive protection from DSS in addition to security provided overseas by the host countries, depending on their post.

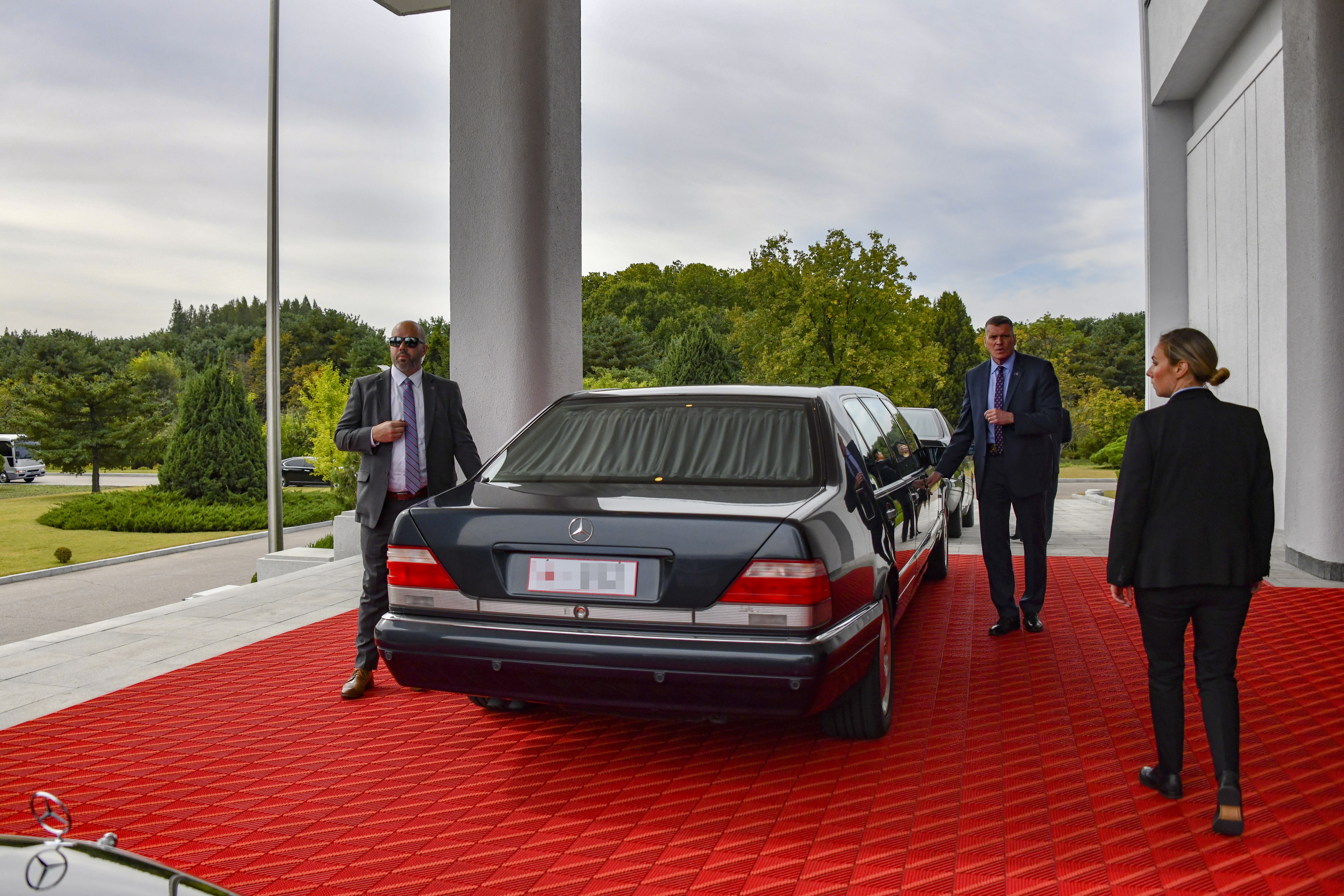
DSS special agents prepare for Secretary of State Mike Pompeo to exit a meeting with North Korean leader Kim Jong Un in Pyongyang.

Protection of visiting foreign ministers and senior officials from major nations, heads of states and governments not officially recognized by the U.S., heads of major international organizations, and high ranking diplomats are typically covered by DSS. Notable protection details include most major members of the British royal family, the Fourteenth Dalai Lama, Palestinian Authority president Mahmoud Abbas, Princess Diana, Yasser Arafat, Tsai Ing-wen and Boris Yeltsin. DSS may also provide protection to high-risk private individuals visiting the United States, such as prominent foreign dissidents or opposition leaders.

While DSS protects visiting foreign dignitaries, the U.S. Department of State's Office of Foreign Missions is responsible for the protection of foreign embassies and consulates on U.S. soil.

Since DSS does not have a true uniformed force with police powers, other agencies or local police departments are reimbursed for providing this service; two notable are the Secret Service Uniformed Division in Washington, D.C. and the New York City Police Department.

During the annual United Nations General Assembly (UNGA) meeting in September, DSS, as well as the U.S. Secret Service and other federal agencies, protect hundreds of foreign dignitaries as they visit New York City.

DSS has the authority to provide protection for foreign heads of state and was the lead agency for this role through the early 1970s. However, an order signed by President Richard Nixon gave primary responsibility of protection of visiting heads of state to the Secret Service.

== Investigations ==
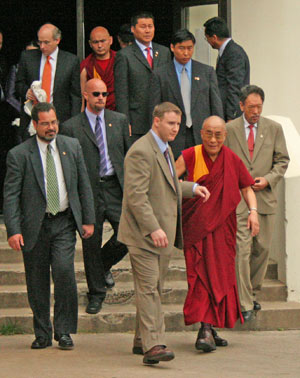
DSS special agents escort the 14th Dalai Lama from a speaking engagement at Rice University

DSS investigations, carried out by numerous field offices and resident agent offices throughout the U.S., and by RSOs overseas, focus mainly on passport or visa fraud. DSS special agents also investigate such cases as human and sex trafficking, document fraud, international parental kidnapping, child exploitation, violations of the Protect Act, assaults on federally protected persons, fugitive arrests overseas (with host nation assistance), counterterrorism and counterintelligence (CI) investigations and international organized crime cases. If there is a nexus to passport and/or visa fraud, use of State Department documents, diplomatic activities, the U.S. Foreign Service, or terrorism, DSS is typically involved.

According to the Bureau of Justice Statistics (BJS) Federal Criminal Case Processing Statistics, the Department of State is responsible for roughly 200 domestic criminal arrests per year from 2011-2019 (with drop-offs due to COVID-19 and other internal factors resulting in a reduction of over 50% in 2020 and 2021).

=== Passport and visa fraud ===
U.S. passports and visas are valuable travel documents, and consequently some foreign nationals fraudulently acquire U.S. passports and visas to carry out criminal activities, including terrorism, inside the borders of the United States.

It is a federal offense to apply, or assist someone in applying, for a U.S. passport or visa when they are not entitled to one. Usually this means an alien in the U.S. trying to establish a false U.S. identity, or stealing the identity from an American, often one who has died.

Visa fraud can also include participating in sham marriages in order to allow an unentitled foreigner to become a U.S. citizen.

Sometimes Americans, including Foreign Service officers (FSOs), are the target of DSS investigations, such as an FSO selling visas for personal gain. DSS also investigates other alleged improper or illegal behavior by Department of State personnel, to include incidents of espionage. Such cases would involve other agencies, such as the Department of Justice.

Overseas DSS must take the role of local and state law enforcement when investigating issues such as spousal or child abuse by U.S. government personnel assigned to the embassy. This is because the host country will not investigate or prosecute diplomats, who are considered to have immunity from their laws. DSS also conducts tens of thousands of background investigations per year – not just for the Department of State, but for other federal agencies as well.

In recent years, DSS has expanded its overseas investigations program with DSS special agents serving as overseas criminal investigators (OCIs). These agents are given special training in consular functions and are commissioned consular officers.

However, they spend a large amount of their time working with the fraud units in consular sections, investigating visa and passport fraud, as well as crimes that have a nexus to those documents, including terrorism, organized crime, trafficking in persons, and narcotics violations.

At the U.S. border, OCIs may work alien smuggling, human trafficking, and passport and visa fraud cases with U.S. Customs and Border Protection (CBP) and Homeland Security Investigations. In addition, OCIs also have responsibilities outside of their respective consular assignments for mission security.

=== Counterintelligence ===
The DSS Office of Investigations and Counterintelligence conducts a counterintelligence program designed to deter, detect, and neutralize the efforts of foreign intelligence services targeting Department of State personnel, facilities, and diplomatic missions worldwide.

The office's counterintelligence division conducts aggressive counterintelligence inquires and counterespionage investigations with other U.S. government agencies. Counterespionage investigations are conducted in coordination with the FBI in accordance with their legal mandates.

The division conducts numerous counterintelligence and security awareness training programs for all U.S. government personnel requesting or having access to sensitive Department of State facilities and information.

All training programs enhance the understanding of both foreign intelligence and espionage threats and countermeasures, and educate employees on the foreign intelligence environment.

In addition, the office relies on a cadre of security engineers to deter, detect, and neutralize attempts by foreign intelligence services to technically penetrate U.S. office buildings and residences.

These efforts range from detecting a simple listening device in the wall to countering the most sophisticated electronic eavesdropping devices and systems.

On June 4, 2009, DSS and the FBI arrested former Department of State employee Walter Kendall Myers on charges of serving as an illegal agent of the Cuban government for nearly 30 years and conspiring to provide classified U.S. information to the Cuban government. Myers’ arrest is the culmination of a three-year joint DSS/FBI investigation.

=== Counterterrorism ===
The Diplomatic Security Service maintains agents on dozens of Joint Terrorism Task Forces around the country.

The Office of Protective Intelligence and Investigations (PII) in the Threat Intelligence and Analysis division has DSS special agents who travel all over the world investigating threats to the secretary of State and U.S. embassies and consulates.

Any time there is a threat or an attack against a U.S. embassy or consulate, DSS special agents are the first on the scene to investigate.

The Rewards for Justice Program (RFJ) is the counterterrorism rewards program of DSS. The secretary of State is currently offering rewards for information that prevents or favorably resolves acts of international terrorism against U.S. persons or property worldwide.

In the days following the April 15, 2013, Boston Marathon bombing, DSS special agents investigated the incident along with personnel from the FBI, HSI, State Police, Boston Police, Cambridge Police, and other law enforcement agencies; this led to the death of one suspect and the capture of the second suspect.

=== Other investigations ===
DSS investigates crimes against State Department personnel and other U.S. government personnel and families assigned under chief-of-mission authority at a U.S. embassy or consulate abroad.

DSS special agents have investigated thefts, assaults, rapes, and murders, among other charges, around the world.

Unlike investigations conducted in the United States by other federal agencies, DSS agents have to work jointly with their foreign counterparts in often hostile areas of the world.

On January 28, 2009, CIA station chief Andrew Warren in Algiers, Algeria, was reportedly under investigation by DSS for having allegedly raped two local women.

=== Fugitives ===
The Diplomatic Security Service is tasked with tracking and capturing fugitives who have fled U.S. jurisdiction to avoid prosecution. DSS locates and helps return approximately 300 fugitives annually, often working with other U.S. law enforcement agencies, most notably the U.S. Marshals Service.

In 1995 DSS special agents Jeff Riner and Bill Miller, the RSOs assigned to the U.S. embassy in Pakistan, along with Pakistani police and Inter-Services Intelligence (ISI), arrested Ramzi Yousef, mastermind of the 1993 World Trade Center bombing. Despite its press releases, the FBI played no role in his capture.

On September 19, 2009, DSS special agents located Derrick Yancey, a former deputy sheriff from DeKalb County, Georgia, in Punta Gorda, Belize. Yancey was wanted in Georgia for double murder of his wife Linda Yancey and a day laborer.

On November 23, 2009, DSS special agents—working closely with the U.S. Marshals Service, Guatemalan National Police, and INTERPOL—located alleged murder suspect twenty-four-year-old Ariel Beau Patrick, who was taken into custody in Guatemala. Ariel Patrick was featured on America's Most Wanted.

On April 26, 2010, after failing to check in with pretrial services within two days of his April 21 hearing on his bond status, Andrew Warren (a former CIA officer) was apprehended by a combined team of Norfolk Police Department fugitive investigators, DSS special agents, and U.S. Marshals.

On July 30, 2010, special agents from DSS located fugitive George Alvin Viste in Peru. Viste was wanted in Clark County, Washington, on seven different criminal charges including the rape of a child, child molestation, and incest. “Diplomatic Security’s Regional Security Office in Lima worked closely with the U.S. Marshals Service and our law enforcement counterparts (INTERPOL) in Peru to locate Viste,” said Jeffrey W. Culver, Director of the Diplomatic Security Service.

On October 8, 2010, DSS agents located Dario Sarimiento Tomas in Pampanga, Philippines. DSS worked with Philippine officials to apprehend Tomas, who was wanted in South Korea on charges that he defrauded an individual there of more than $200,000. Tomas was arrested by law enforcement officials from the Philippine National Bureau of Investigations and National Police. Tomas was assigned to the U.S. Embassy in Seoul as a Customs and Border Protection Officer.

On February 3, 2011, Paul Eischeid, a fugitive and member of the Hells Angels who had eluded U.S. Marshals for nearly eight years, was arrested. The accused murderer was arrested in Buenos Aires. An Interpol Red Notice, as well as investigations by the U.S. Marshals Service and DSS in Argentina led to his capture.

On November 7, 2012, the U.S. Marshals Service (USMS) announces the capture of John Earl Gorham. The U.S. Parole Commission issued an arrest warrant for Gorham on Oct. 17, regarding the subject's original conviction of sodomy, kidnapping and assault with the intent to commit sodomy. Gorham was convicted and sentenced to 35 years on these charges. Gorham was arrested for being drunk in public and for sexually assaulting a fourteen-year-old female at a Chantilly High School football game. The USMS and task force partners from the Diplomatic Security Service located Gorham at his residence on Church Lane in Bowie, MD.

On April 20, 2013, in coordination with Nicaraguan authorities, the FBI's Panama City Legal Attaché Office and the Diplomatic Security's Regional Security Office at the U.S. Embassy in Managua located Eric Justin Toth in Esteli, Nicaragua, where he was placed into custody. His arrest was the result of a coordinated investigation by the FBI's Washington Field Office, the FBI legal attaché, and special agents of the Diplomatic Security Service assigned to the U.S. embassy in Managua.

In May 2022, yoga instructor Kaitlin Armstrong fled the United States to Costa Rica. Accused of murdering cyclist Anna Moriah Wilson, Armstrong attempted to evade arrest by hiding in Santa Teresa, a small Costa Rican town popular with surfers and yoga enthusiasts. DSS investigators conducted an exhaustive search for Armstrong, eventually locating her. Costa Rican tourist officials arrested Armstrong. Two U.S. Marshals flew into Costa Rica to assist with the final elements of the investigation, and to help return her to the United States. In November 2023, Texas jury sentenced Armstrong to 90 years in federal prison for the murder of Wilson.

== Overseas mission ==
=== Regional security officer (RSO) ===
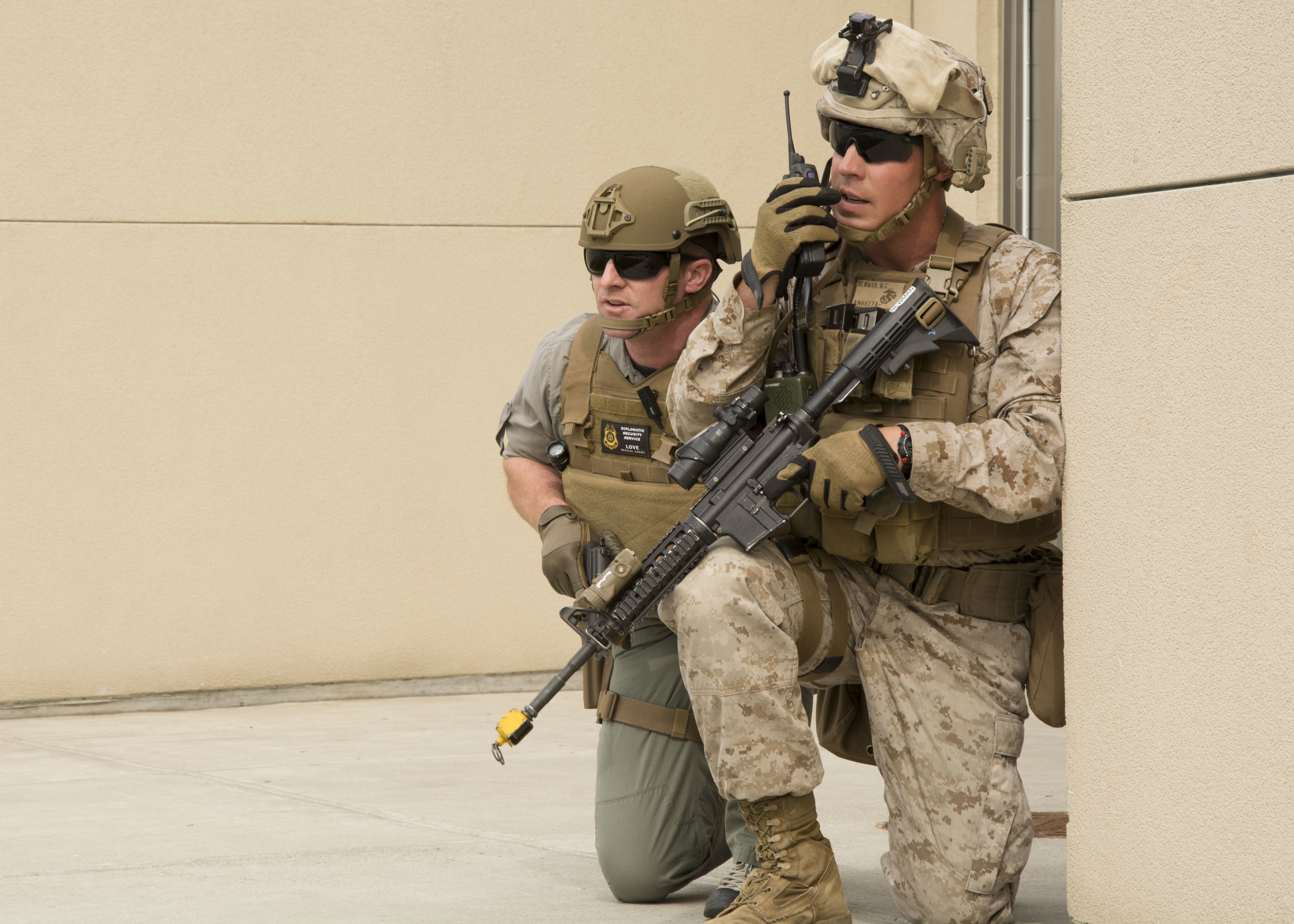
A DSS assistant regional security officer (left) and a Marine with Fleet Anti-terrorism Security Team Europe during an exercise at the U.S. embassy in Belgrade

The DSS presence overseas is led at each embassy and consulate by a DSS special agent known as a regional security officer (RSO), who is in charge of the Regional Security Office, and serves as the senior law enforcement advisor and security attaché to the U.S. ambassador.

Like all members of the Foreign Service, DSS agents cannot remain posted in the U.S. for more than six consecutive years and must eventually be assigned to an overseas post. Once assigned overseas, a DSS agent will typically serve first as a special agent called an assistant regional security officer (ARSO) in a regional security office. Agents who enjoy the overseas lifestyle will try to get a second tour in a special agent slot at a large embassy, or possibly serve as a regional security officer (RSO) at a small post or as a deputy regional security officer (DRSO) at a medium-sized post. Usually after two back-to-back overseas tours, agents will be encouraged to return to the U.S. and serve in a headquarters position before returning overseas as a regional security officer.

DSS has many special agents who serve as overseas criminal investigators (OCIs). These agents work out of the consular sections of embassies and consulates instead of the regional security offices.

It is possible at larger overseas missions with multiple diplomatic facilities located in the same country to have multiple agents with the regional security officer title. India, for example, has an RSO position at the embassy at the Senior Foreign Service level and four other RSOs at the consulates at the significantly lower grade 3 level yet all of these agents have the same job title. Sometimes the title senior regional security officer will be used to help prevent confusion or to indicate that the agent is the most senior in the country.

There are several other overseas positions filled by DSS agents. At new building construction sites, agents will serve as the site security manager (SSM) where they will supervise the overall security of the new building including the construction security technicians (CST) and cleared American guards (CAG). For construction at posts where there is a critical counterintelligence (CI) threat, agents will also serve as CI investigators dedicated to preventing compromise of the most sensitive spaces within the new embassy.

It is common for domestically assigned DSS agents to serve temporary duty (TDY) at embassies overseas. Such duty can range from various types of protection duties to RSO support or security training for an overseas post, and may last for as little as a few days to multiple months. Likewise, hundreds of DSS agents assigned overseas travel to New York on TDY to support the United Nations General Assembly every year.

DSS agents have often found themselves in harm's way, with four agents and more than a hundred others dying in the line of duty as of April 2024. The vast majority of DSS casualties had taken place within the five years in Iraq, where DSS continued to conduct its most critical and dangerous protective missions.

==== Overseas Criminal Investigations Division ====
The Overseas Criminal Investigations Division manages all DSS investigative forces abroad through the work of its criminal investigators—DSS special agents responsible for ensuring the integrity of the U.S. passport and visa system.

Embedded in 120 diplomatic posts across 85 countries, there are roughly 130 OCIs who conduct criminal investigations and work with foreign governments to build a global law enforcement network; they maintain formal partnerships and training programs with foreign police, immigration, and customs officials to target a wide range of criminals, including forgers, smugglers, and terrorists.

The division's prevailing goal is to "combat crime where it originates rather than waiting for it to cross U.S. borders."

OCIs have locally employed staff, called criminal fraud investigators and foreign service national investigators, to assist with investigations, locating fugitives, and liaising with host nation counterparts.

With its global partners, OCIs help locate and return an average of 300 fugitives to the U.S. annually; missions have included dismantling major human smuggling networks, identifying criminals involved in child exploitation and pornography, ending international scams, and disrupting suspected terrorist travel.

== Special event security ==
In addition to being posted at U.S. missions around the world, DSS agents have worked closely with their foreign counterparts to secure such events as the 2008 Olympic Games in Beijing, China, the 2007 Pan American Games in Rio de Janeiro, Brazil, 2006 Winter Olympic Games in Turin, Italy; the 2010 Winter Olympics in Vancouver, Canada, 2010 World Cup football matches, and a host of other special events. For events with a large U.S. presence, such as the Olympics, a security coordinator—always a DSS agent—manages all security and liaison with the host government.

All other federal agencies—such as the FBI, ATF, USSS, and DOD components—report to the DSS agent in charge.

== Hiring process ==
All DSS special agents have at least a four-year bachelor's degree, and most have graduate or post-graduate degrees. Special agent candidates must be under the age of thirty-seven at the time of commissioning, unless granted a waiver due to prior military service.

== Training ==
After a new agent candidate is hired, they begin a nearly nine-month training program that includes the criminal investigator training program (CITP) at the U.S. Department of Homeland Security's law enforcement training center in Glynco, Georgia; a basic special agent course (BSAC) at the Foreign Affairs Security Training Center (FASTC) in Blackstone, Virginia; and courses at the Foreign Service Institute (FSI) in Arlington, Virginia.

After completion of all initial training, agents are required to pass quarterly re-qualifications on their duty weapons, which include the Glock 19M, Glock 26, Colt sub-machine gun, the Mk18 rifle, and Remington 870 shotgun.

A new special agent is typically assigned to a domestic field office for two to three years before taking on an overseas assignment, although an agent can expect to be sent on frequent temporary duty assignments overseas even when assigned to a domestic post. Agents may also be called overseas much earlier depending on the needs of the DSS.

As members of the Foreign Service, DSS special agents spend nearly half of their careers living and working overseas, often in hazardous environments and less developed countries throughout the world.

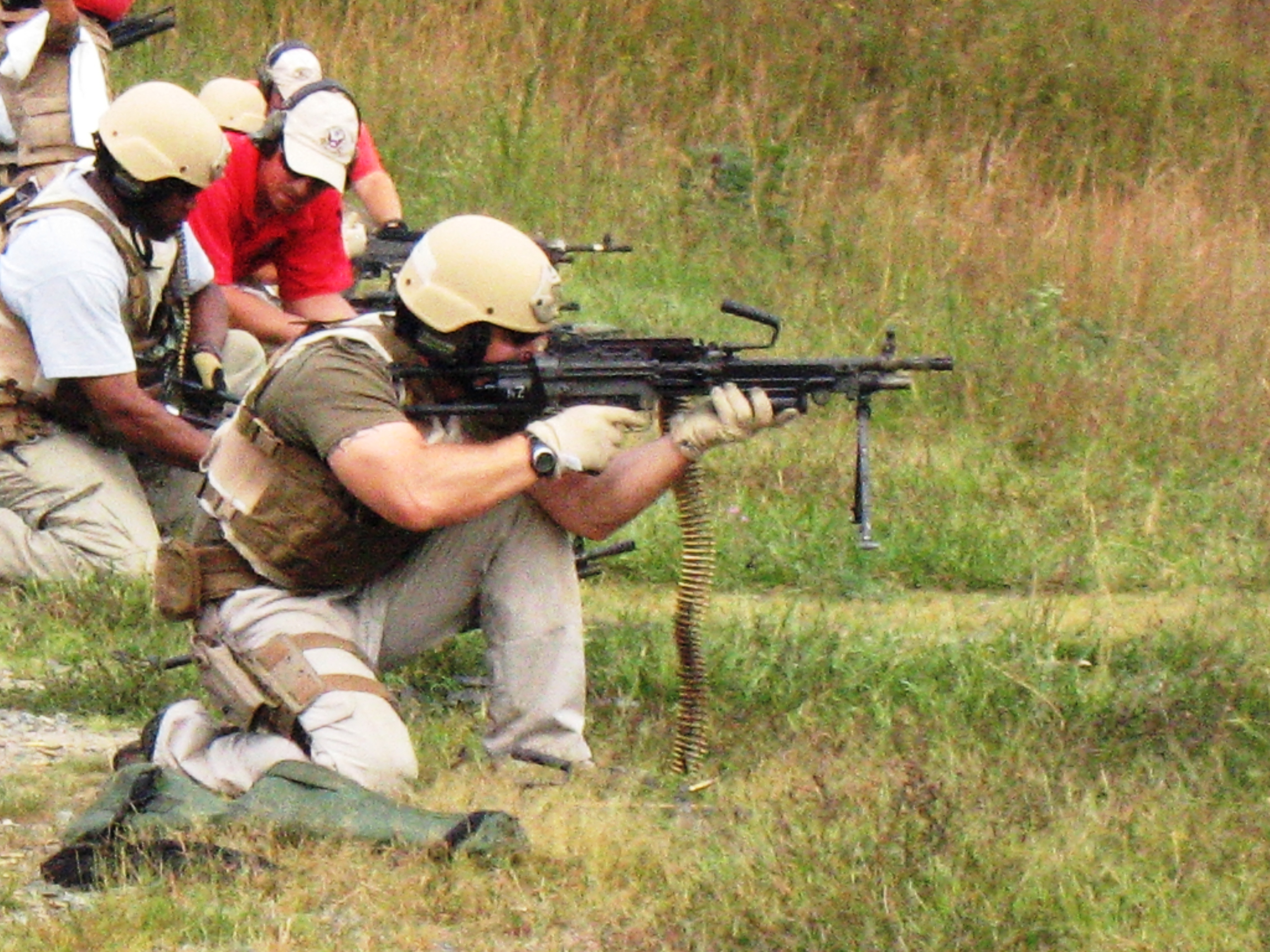
DSS special agents on the range with an M249 Para

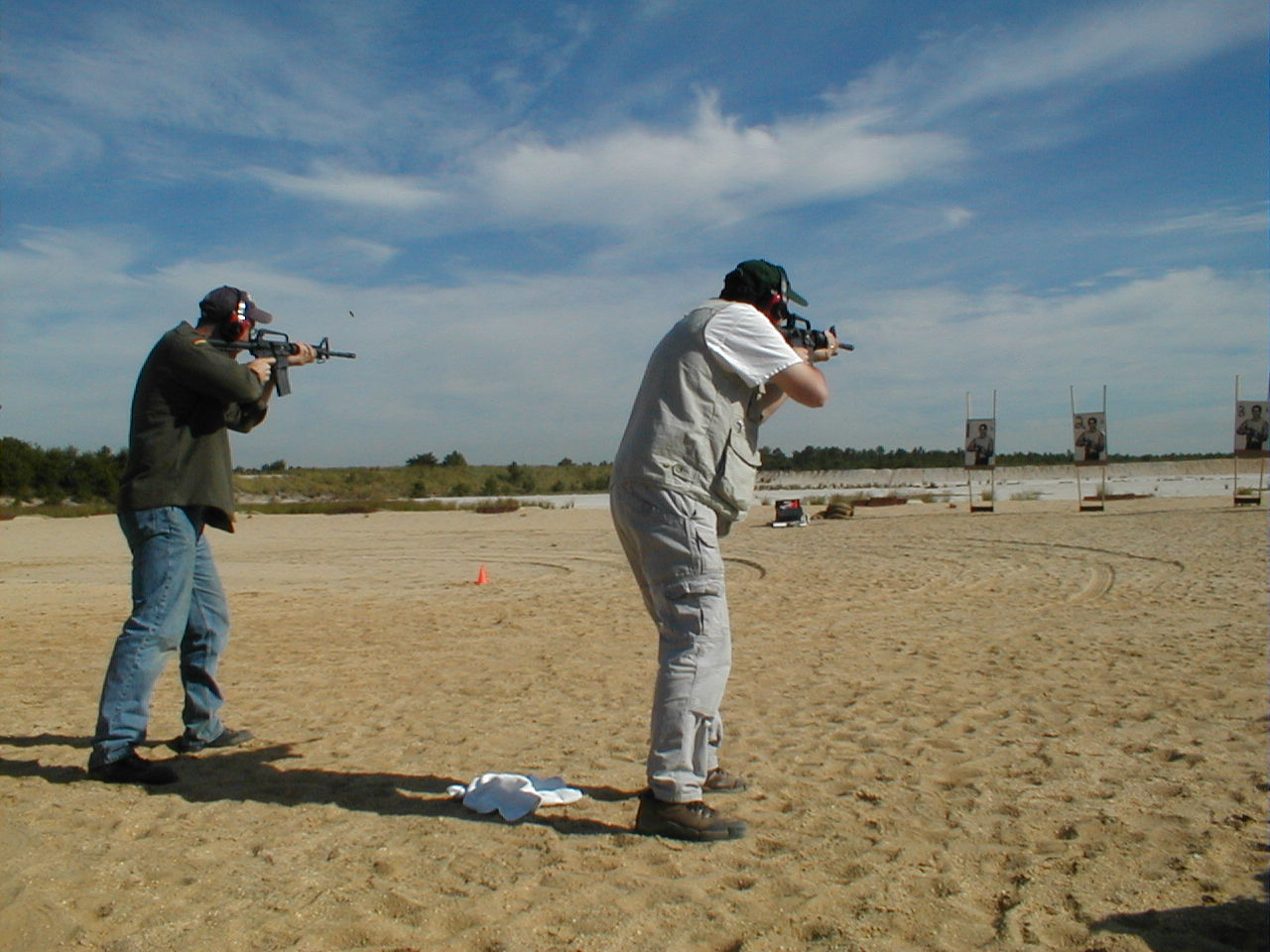
DSS special agents with M4s at range

- Basic Special Agent Course (BSAC) (including FLETC): 9 months
- Basic Regional Security Office Course (RSO School): 3 months
- Advanced Tactics and Leadership (ATLaS): 11 weeks
- Language Training: 2–12 months per language
- Basic Field Firearms Officer Course (BFFOC): 2 weeks
- High Risk Environment Firearms Course (HREFC): 3 days

== Weapons ==
When assigned to the United States, special agents are authorized to carry firearms both on and off duty. When assigned overseas, they are authorized to carry firearms only when approved by the chief of mission

Name	Country of origin	Type	Status
Smith & Wesson Model 19	United States	Revolver	Retired
SIG P228	Germany	Semi-automatic pistol	Retired
SIG P229	Germany	Semi-automatic pistol	Retired
Uzi	Israel	Submachine gun	Retired
Colt SMG	United States	Submachine gun	Retired
Ruger Mini-14	United States	Carbine	Retired
Glock 19M	Austria	Semi-automatic pistol	Standard issue
Glock 26	Austria	Semi-automatic pistol	Standard issue
Remington 870	United States	Shotgun	Standard issue
Colt M4	United States	Assault rifle	Standard issue
Heckler & Koch MP5	Germany	Submachine gun	Additional issue
Close Quarters Battle Receiver	United States	Assault rifle	Additional issue
M249 light machine gun	United States	Squad automatic weapon	Additional issue
M240 machine gun	United States	General-purpose machine gun	Additional issue
M203 grenade launcher	United States	Grenade launcher	Additional issue
M2 Browning	United States	Heavy machine gun	Additional issue

These and other weapons systems may be employed by DSS special agents assigned to high-threat locations. The agents going to those locations attend additional training (ATLaS/HTOC) in these weapons before they are deployed.

== Leadership ==
=== Bureau of Secret Intelligence directors ===
Also known as Office of the Chief Special Agent.

- Robert Lansing (1916), secretary of state exercising direct control over the Bureau of Secret Intelligence
- Leland Harrison (1916), special assistant who reports to the deputy secretary of state (Counselor – Frank L. Polk)
- Joseph Nye (1917–1920), first chief special agent
- Robert C. Bannerman (1920–1940), father of future SY director
- Thomas F. Fitch (1940–1947)

=== Office of Security directors ===
- Robert L. Bannerman (1945–1947), father of third generation SY/DS agent
- Donald Nicholson (1948–1952)
- John Ford (1952–1953)
- Dennis Flinn (1953–1956)
- E. Tomlin Bailey (1956–1958)
- William O. Boswell (1958–1962), father of future DS assistant secretary of state Eric J. Boswell
  - Otto Otepka, deputy director (1959–1962)
- John Francis Reilly (1962–1963)
- G. Marvin Gentile (1964–1974) former FBI special agent and CIA security officer
- Viktor Dikeos (1974–1978)
- Karl Ackerman (1978–1982), former SY special agent and FBI special agent
- Marvin Garrett (1982–1983)
- David C. Fields (1984–1985)
- David A. Boling (SY special agent and diplomatic officer)

=== DSS directors ===
The director of the DSS is also the principal deputy assistant secretary of state for the Bureau of Diplomatic Security, reporting to the assistant secretary of state for diplomatic security.

List of DSS directors
Name	Term Dates	Notes
David C. Fields	1985–1986	
Louis Schwartz, Jr.	1986–1988	
Clark M. Ditmer	1988–1993	
Mark E. Mulvey	1993–1996	
Gregorie Bujac	1996–1998	
Peter E. Bergin	1998–2003	
Joe D. Morton	2003–2007	son of former DSS Director
Gregory B. Starr	2007–2009	
Patrick D. Donovan	2009	
Jeffrey W. Culver	2009–2011	
Scott Bultrowicz	2011–2012	
Gregory B. Starr	February 1, 2013 – November 17, 2013	Was reappointed as director on February 1, 2013, to enable him to serve as acting assistant secretary pending formal nomination and confirmation.
Bill Miller	April 14, 2014 – July 27, 2017	
Christian J. Schurman	November 28, 2017 – March 2018	
Todd J. Brown	March 3, 2018 – July 2020	
Carlos Matus	July 2020 – May 2025	
Thad Osterhout	May 2025 – February 2026	
Nicholas Collura	February 2026 – present	

== Fatalities ==
Since the establishment of the Diplomatic Security Service, four special agents have died in the line of duty. As of March 2016, a further 133 locally engaged DSS staff, host country law enforcement personnel, and members of the U.S. military had been killed while undertaking diplomatic security duties.

== See also ==
- Bureau of Diplomatic Security bibliography
- Europol
- Federal Protective Service (FSO), a Russian service that among other security activities provides protection to state visits
- Office of Mobile Security Deployments (MSD), Diplomatic Security Service's tactical unit
- Office of the Inspector General of the Department of State
- Parliamentary and Diplomatic Protection, a British police unit providing protection to foreign diplomats and heads of state visiting the UK, part of the Metropolitan Police Service
- U.S. Border Patrol
- Marine Security Guard
- United States Army Counterintelligence (USACI)
- Board of Executive Protection Professionals (BEPP)

Military Criminal Investigative Organizations

- Air Force Office of Special Investigations (AFOSI or OSI)
- Naval Criminal Investigative Service (NCIS)
- United States Army Criminal Investigation Command (USACIDC or CID)
- Coast Guard Investigative Service (CGIS)
