= Regional Security Office =

Diplomatic Security Service seal

A Regional Security Office is the office at a U.S. Embassy or Consulate that oversees all functions of security. It is headed by a special agent of the U.S. Diplomatic Security Service (DSS) who has the title of Regional Security Officer (RSO).

The employees of a Regional Security Office are responsible for the safety and security of all Americans at post. This includes managing security for official buildings, as well as residences.

== Overview ==
Within a Regional Security Office, and under its RSO, may be found Assistant RSOs, Office Management Specialists and other assistants. In addition, the Engineering Services Center/Office, and the Marine Security Guard detachment office, which report through the RSO, are considered to be sub-units of the Regional Security Office.

== Fugitives ==
The U.S. Diplomatic Security Service is the most widely represented law enforcement organizations in the world; it has the capability to track and capture fugitives who have fled U.S. jurisdiction to avoid prosecution. During 2009, DSS assisted in the resolution of 136 international fugitive cases from around the globe.

== See also ==
- Ramzi Yousef - captured by U.S. Diplomatic Security utilizing Rewards for Justice (RFJ)
- Rewards for Justice - money for information leading to the capture of terrorists, administered by U.S. Diplomatic Security
