= Secret Service Counter Assault Team =

Specialized tactical unit of the U.S. Secret Service

Counter Assault Team
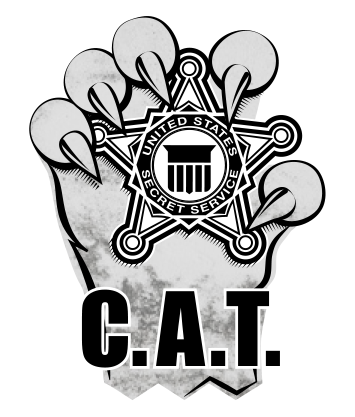
- Logo of the Counter Assault Team
- Active: 1979–present
- Country: United States
- Agency: U.S. Secret Service
- Type: Police tactical unit
- Role: Law enforcement
- Operations jurisdiction: National; International
- Part of: Special Operations Division
- Abbreviation: CAT

Structure
- Operators: 105

The Counter Assault Team (CAT) is a specialized tactical unit of the U.S. Secret Service that provides tactical support to the Presidential Protective Division to protect the president of the United States. The CAT can also provide tactical support to other designated protectees, at venues and National Special Security Events.

The Secret Service first began fielding counter assault teams in 1979. "Hawkeye" is the designation for a CAT assigned to the president, followed by the president's Secret Service code name. For example, the code name for President Obama's CAT was "Hawkeye Renegade".

== History ==
Before 1979, Secret Service vehicle convoys for VIPs in high-risk situations included a large sedan known as the "muscle car" in which five or six Secret Service special agents armed with sub-machine guns rode. The "muscle car" team was an ad hoc contingent drawn from special agents working at a local Secret Service office, as opposed to those regularly assigned to protective duties. They were instructed, in the event of an attack against the convoy, to lay down a barrage of suppressive fire against the source of the attack so as to allow the dignitary's vehicle the opportunity to escape without being pursued or blockaded.

In 1979, the Secret Service formalized the counter-assault team program with permanently assigned, specially trained operators.

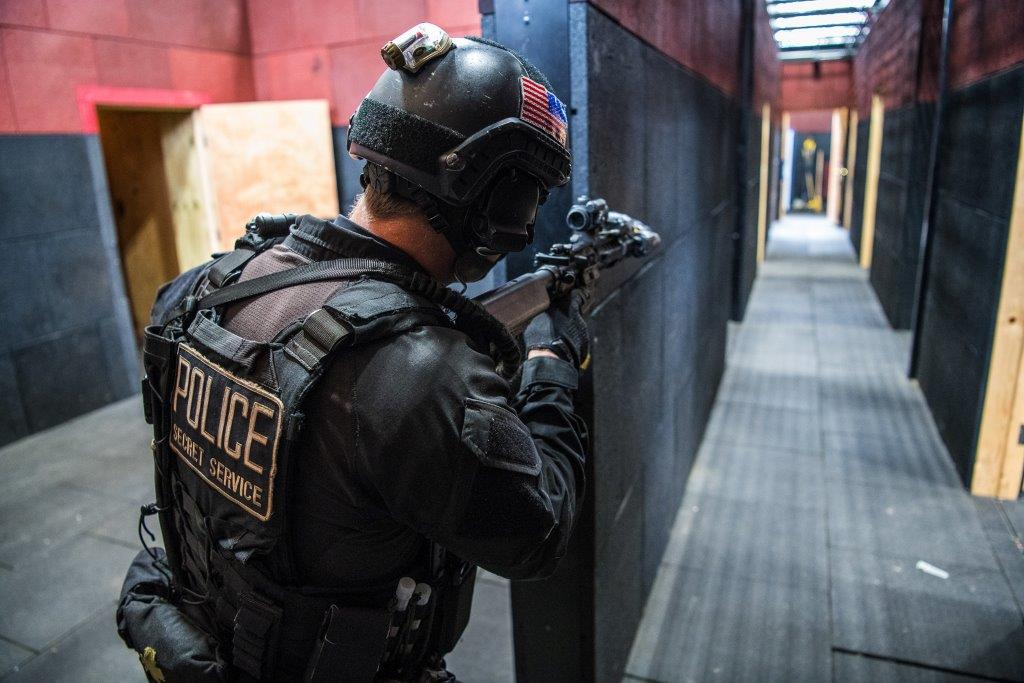
Counter Assault Team member training at the Rowley Training Center in 2018

=== Hawkeye ===
Following the attempted assassination of Ronald Reagan in 1981, a CAT that came to be designated "Hawkeye" was assigned to full-time presidential escort duty.

In 2012, special agents assigned to Hawkeye were implicated in the Summit of the Americas prostitution scandal.

== Operations ==
=== Selection and training ===
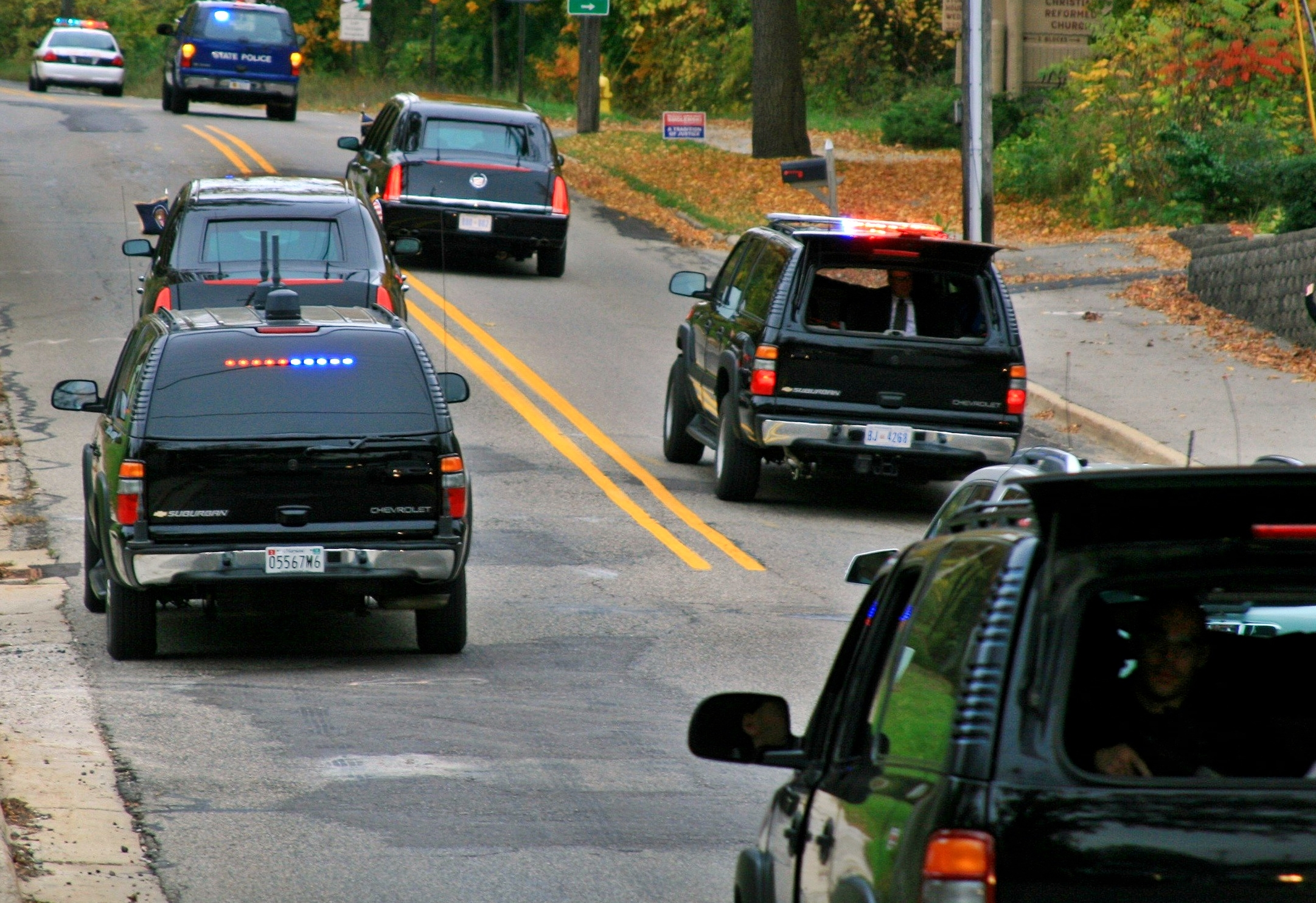
A motorcade during the presidency of George W. Bush with the Counter Assault Team in the vehicle in bottom right

Members of the counter-assault team are Secret Service special agents who have completed an initial eight-month course at the Federal Law Enforcement Training Center in Glynco, Georgia, and have successfully served several years in the Secret Service. Upon selection, CAT operators undergo an additional seven weeks of specialized training, including in counter-ambush tactics and close quarters combat. Applications to join the team are competitive, and physical requirements for entry include the demonstrated ability to do three pull-ups wearing a 45-pound (20 kg) weighted vest and to complete a 1.5-mile (2.4 km) run in under nine minutes. Approximately ten percent of applicants are ultimately selected.

=== Equipment ===
Typically, CAT members deploy in black battle dress uniforms. Each member not otherwise assigned a heavier weapon is equipped with a SR-16 rifle, a SIG Sauer P229 pistol, and flash-bang grenades.

=== Duties ===
CAT operates both as part of motorcades and at fixed sites. In the event a VIP, the VIP's vehicle, or a protected site is attacked by multiple assailants, CAT is responsible for engaging and diverting the attackers, thereby buying the close protection shift time to evacuate the dignitary to a safe area.

Hawkeye, when operating as part of a U.S. president's motorcade, travels in a vehicle several car lengths behind the presidential state car.

== See also ==
- FBI Hostage Rescue Team
- DSS Mobile Security Deployments
