= Andrew Warren =

American author and CIA operative

Andrew Marvin Warren
- Born: 1967 (age 58–59); Chesapeake, Virginia, U.S.
- Education: Norfolk State University (BA)
- Occupations: CIA operative and author
- Status: Released
- Convictions: Abusive sexual contact Possession of a firearm by an unlawful user of a controlled substance
- Penalty: 5 years and 5 months imprisonment

Andrew Marvin Warren (born 1967; Chesapeake, Virginia) is a former CIA operative who served as CIA station chief in Algiers, Algeria, during 2007–2008. In 2010, he pleaded guilty to charges of sexual assault of two women, and the following year he was sentenced to over 5 years in federal prison. He was released from prison in 2015. As a result of the criminal charges, he was also fired from the CIA.

== Early life, education, and career ==
Warren has martial arts training, extensive knowledge of the Middle East, and speaks six Arabic dialects as well as Persian.

Warren enrolled at Old Dominion University in 1986. He earned a Bachelor of Arts summa cum laude at Norfolk State University, graduating in 1993 with a 3.9 GPA. He studied history and political science at Indiana University in the summer of 1992, around which time he was spotted by a CIA on-campus agency recruiter. From 1994, he spent two summers continuing his Arabic studies at Yarmouk University in Jordan. In 1996, he was employed as a language analyst for the National Security Agency before being hired by the CIA.

Warren's first undercover job was in Kuwait in 1999. He left the CIA in 2001, and took a job with Citigroup in New York City a month before the September 11 terrorist attack. He received a call from the CIA that day and was back working with the CIA the next day, where he worked in counter-terrorism in New York. In 2002, he was deployed to the Middle East, his mission was to collect intelligence. He returned to his New York counter-terrorism position in June 2003. In 2004, Warren was promoted to second in command of the CIA's Cairo bureau. He was stationed in Algeria since 2007 and recalled by the CIA in October 2008. He was fired in 2009.

In an interview in 2013, Warren admitted to participating in the torture of detainees. He drank more heavily as he started to question the morality of his actions.

== Criminal case ==
In late 2008, two Algerian women came forward and accused Warren of drugging and raping them while at his home. On February 17, 2008, Warren admitted that he had sexually assaulted one of the women on the U.S. Embassy property in Algiers, according to the U.S. Attorney's Office.

He was indicted on June 18, 2009, by a grand jury of the U.S. District Court for the District of Columbia on one count of sexual abuse and was arraigned on June 30, 2009. He was investigated by the Department of State's Diplomatic Security Service and prosecuted by attorneys from the U.S. Attorney's Office for the District of Columbia and the Department of Justice, Criminal Division, Domestic Security Section. Warren was arrested April 26, 2010, in Norfolk, after he missed a pretrial appearance earlier in the month. He was in possession of a handgun and drug paraphernalia.

On June 7, 2010, Warren pleaded guilty to abusive sexual contact and unlawful use of cocaine while possessing a firearm. Had he been convicted of the rape charge, for which he had originally been indicted, Warren could have faced up to life in prison. On March 3, 2011, Judge Ellen Segal Huvelle sentenced Warren to serve 65 months. The judge added almost two years to the sentence that prosecutors had originally requested, saying it appeared that Warren believed he would get away with the offense because of diplomatic immunity as well as the victim's fear of reporting the crime.
