= Regional Security Officer =

United States security officer

Diplomatic Security Service seal

A regional security officer (RSO) is a special agent of the U.S. Diplomatic Security Service (DSS) in charge of a regional security office. The RSO is the principal security attaché and advisor to the U.S. ambassador at American embassies and consulates. Working for the United States Department of State as special agents, RSOs are also considered to be officers of the State Department acting as specialists within the United States Foreign Service. The RSO is also the senior law enforcement representative at a U.S. Embassy.

== Authority and responsibilities ==
Working under the dual supervision of the chief of mission (ambassador) and the Diplomatic Security Service, the RSO ensures that all mandated security programs are carried out. The word "regional" derives from a historical shortage of agents, leading to many embassies with no resident DSS agent; often an RSO would have to oversee security at several embassies and consulates. Since virtually each embassy now has an RSO, the term is largely anachronistic. In some cases, an RSO may regionally oversee security at consulates and other U.S. presence facilities from an embassy within a country.

At an embassy, the RSO reports directly to the deputy chief of mission, who in turn reports directly to the ambassador. Under the RSO's direct supervision are the following groups: U.S. Marine security guards, assistant RSOs, local guards, foreign service national (FSN) investigators, an office management specialist and other secretarial and staff assistants, a surveillance detection unit (with a mission of detecting hostile surveillance), security engineering officers, security technical specialists, as well as Navy Seabees assigned to post.

The RSO is in charge of security for all Americans assigned to an embassy (or on temporary duty to Post) that come under the authority of the Chief of Mission. The RSO's responsibility for security relates to personnel, information, physical security of embassy buildings and residences, as well as the conduct of criminal investigations, particularly those involving passport and visa fraud. At larger embassies having other law enforcement agencies in addition to the Diplomatic Security Service, the RSO chairs a law enforcement working group as the Ambassador's main law enforcement and security attaché/advisor. This group is composed of all other U.S. law enforcement agencies that may be represented at an embassy such as ICE/HSI, CBP, FBI/LEGAT (legal attaché), U.S. Secret Service, NCIS, AFOSI and others. The working group ensures that the ambassador is apprised of all significant law enforcement activity at post.

== Fugitives ==
Since the Diplomatic Security Service is the most widely represented law enforcement organization in the world, its capability to track and capture fugitives who have fled U.S. jurisdiction to avoid prosecution is unmatched. During 2009, the DSS assisted in the resolution of 136 international fugitive cases around the globe.

The role of the DSS in tracking international fugitives was highlighted in the movies Fast Five and Fast & Furious 6.

== See also ==
- Ramzi Yousef
- Rewards for Justice Program
