= Bureau of Secret Intelligence =

Defunct United States law enforcement agency

The Bureau of Secret Intelligence (Office of the Chief Special Agent) was founded in 1916. The U.S. Department of State's Bureau of Secret Intelligence, later known as the Office of Security (SY) and now as the U.S. Diplomatic Security Service, was also known as U-1, an off-the-books adjunct to the Division of Information.

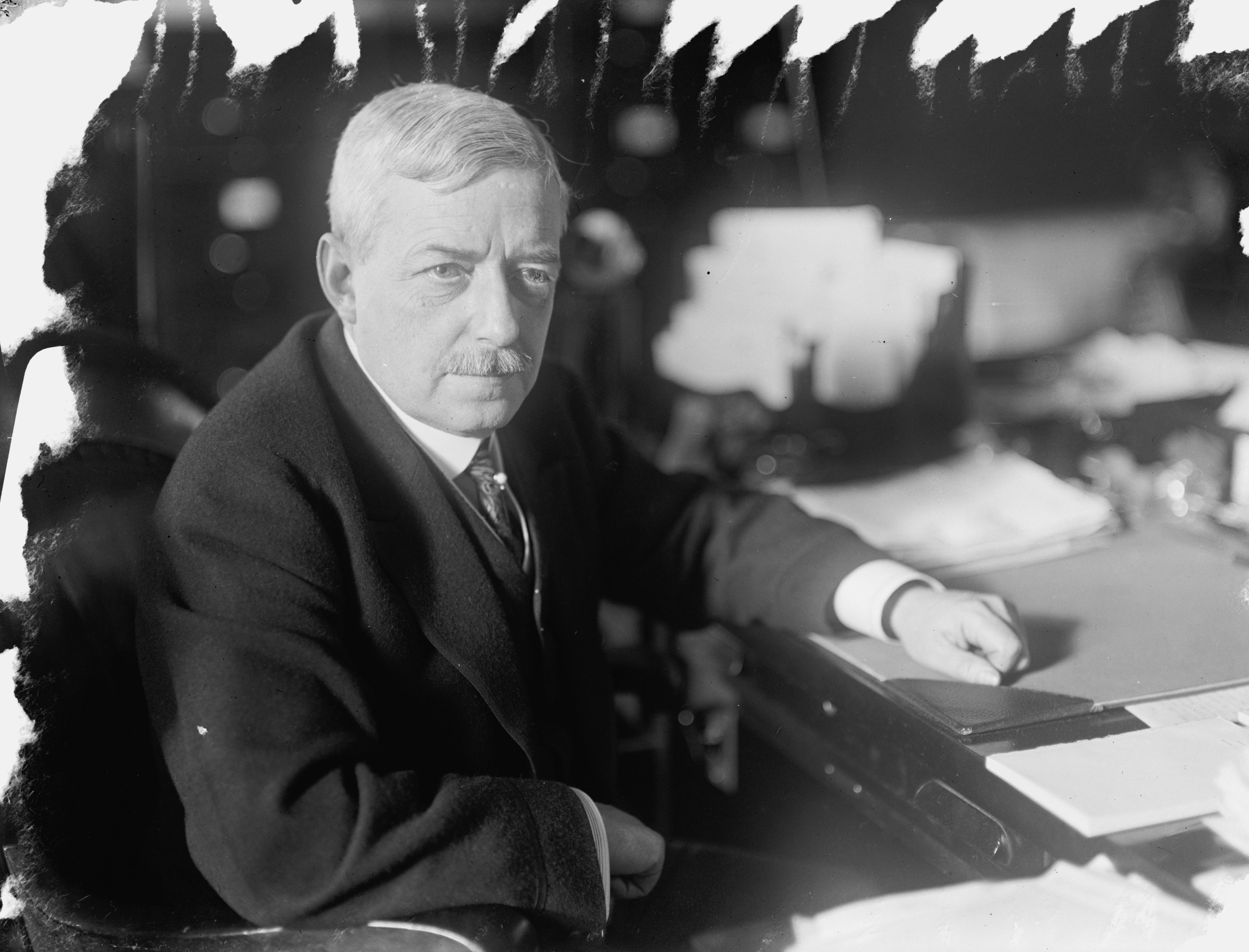
U.S. Secretary of State Robert Lansing

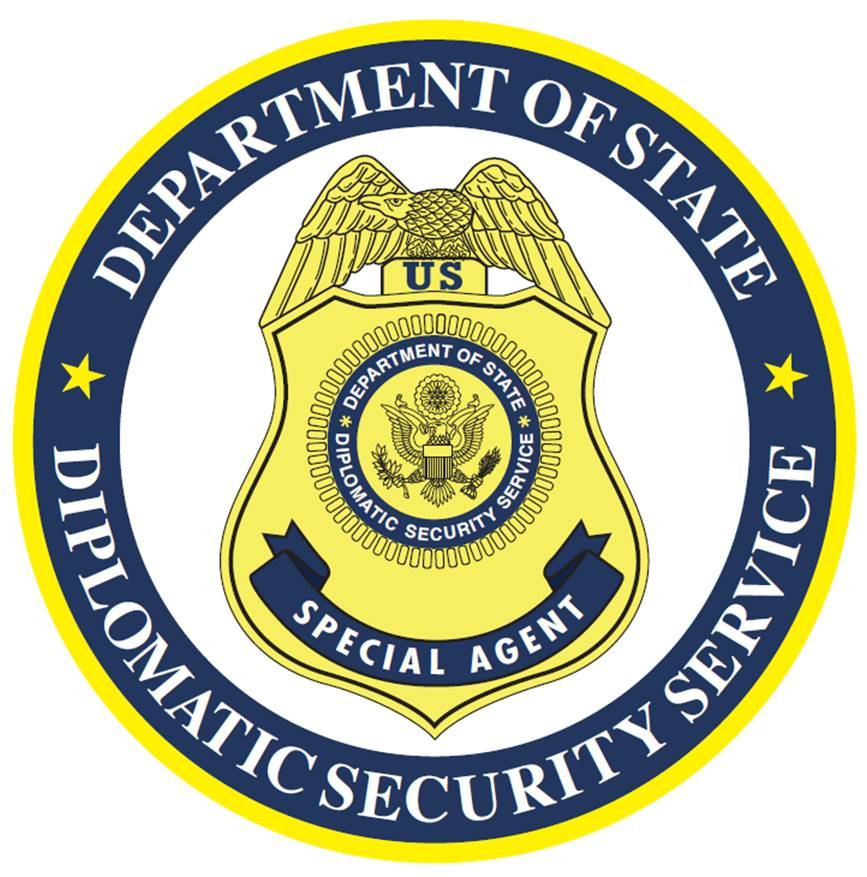
Diplomatic Security Service seal

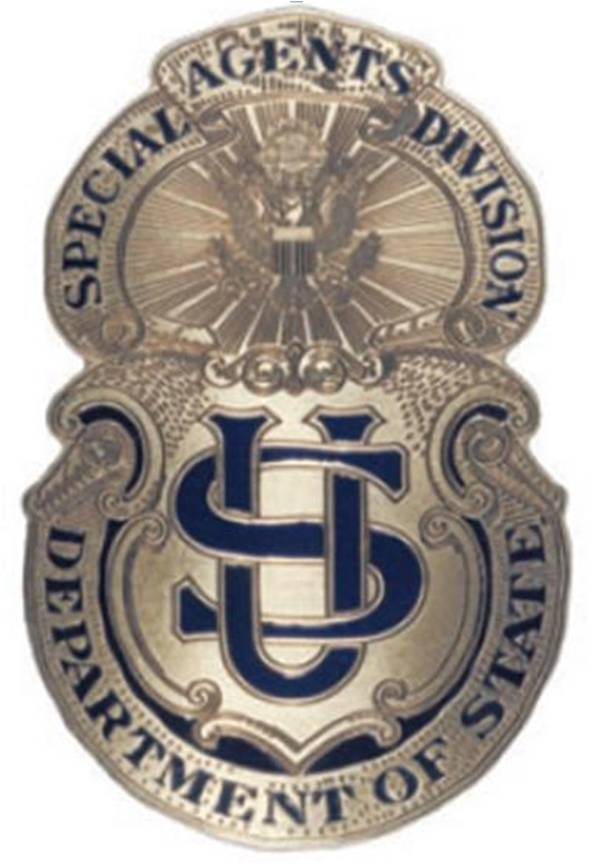
1916 badge of the Bureau of Secret Intelligence

The origins of the U.S. State Department's Diplomatic Security Service (DSS) go back to 1916 with a handful of agents assigned special duties directly by the Secretary of State (SECSTATE), Robert Lansing.

Lansing, who used MID and Department of the Treasury Secret Service agents to obtain secret information, longed for direct control over his own agents; therefore, in 1916 he created a Bureau of Secret Intelligence.

President Wilson allowed Lansing and Frank Polk quietly and informally to channel the flow of military and law enforcement material into the State Department's Bureau of Secret Intelligence (U-1). The two men picked a young clerk named Leland Harrison "to take charge of the collection and examination of all information of a secret nature coming into the Department from various sources and also to direct the work of the agents specially employed for that purpose."

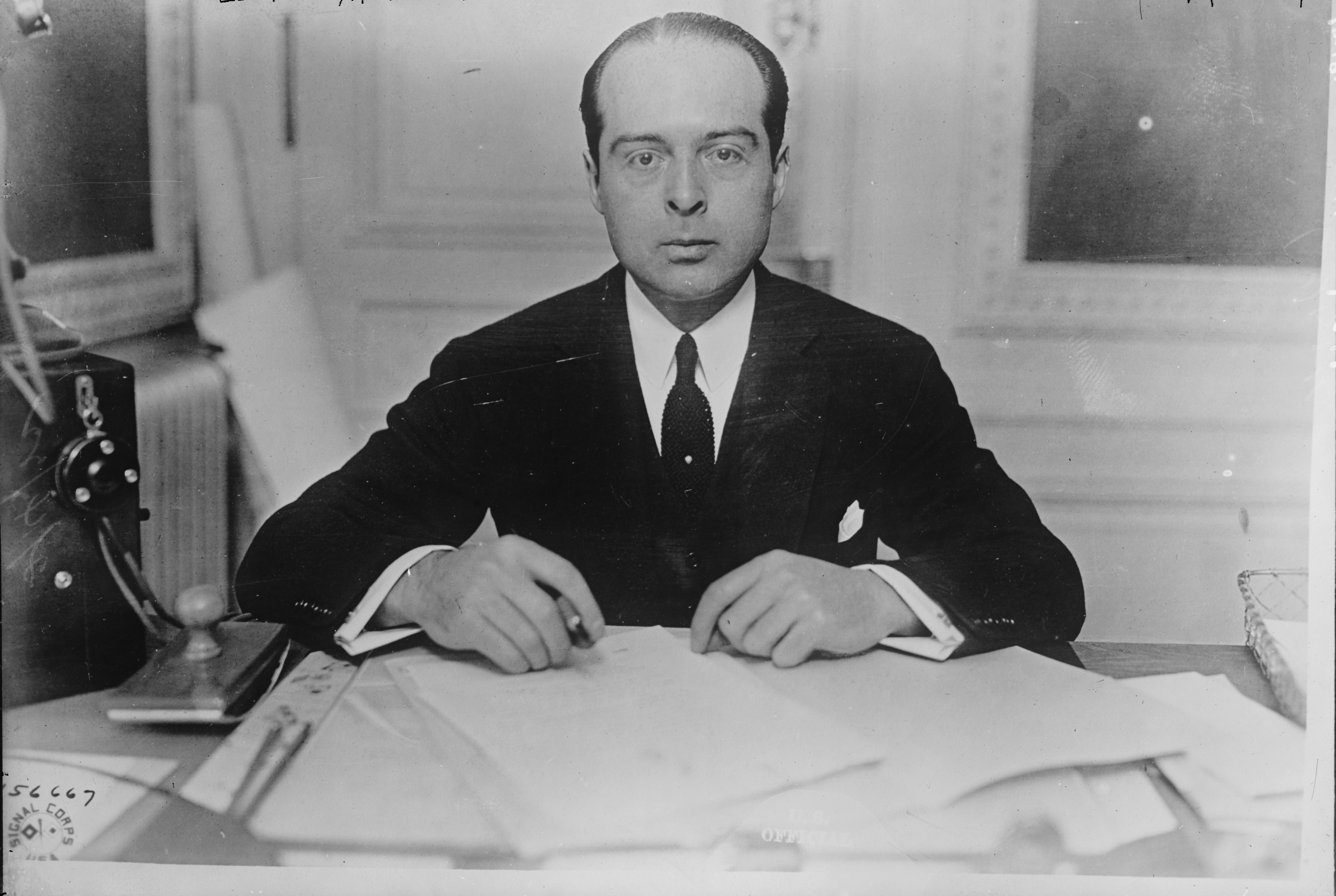
Leland Harrison

Lansing moved to create this inter-agency "secret service" for the Department of State. Many German and Austrian acts of fraud, propaganda, sabotage, and espionage cut across or fell between the jurisdictions of various U.S. law enforcement agencies. Secretary of the Treasury William McAdoo admitted that the Secret Service, the Federal Bureau of Investigation, and the Post Office Inspection Service were often "crossing wires with [one] another in running down crimes and conducting investigations" of espionage, fraud, and sabotage. To rectify this, Lansing proposed creating an office under the Department of State's Office of the Counselor to review investigation reports from several law enforcement agencies.

In proposing this to President Wilson, Lansing contended that given the serious diplomatic consequences involved with both the act and the investigation, the Department of State should oversee the response and actions of other agencies. Lansing envisioned the proposed office to be a clearinghouse of information, and he hoped that the Departments of Justice and Treasury, and the Postal Service would detail agents to this Bureau of Secret Intelligence to gather information on belligerent activity in the United States.

As Robert Lansing recalled in his memoirs, "The 'Secret Service' of the Department of State was an organization of slow growth during the period when this country was neutral. Prior to that time the department had no 'Secret Service'. It was found necessary for the department to conduct some investigations of highly confidential character and for this purpose a few operatives of other departments were detailed to it. Agents were also employed in the other countries.

Headed by a Chief Special Agent, who was also called Special Assistant to the Secretary, these agents worked in Washington, D.C., and New York City. This group of agents would sometimes be referred to as the office of the Chief Special Agent. They were operated with private funds from the Secretary's office. Conducting sensitive investigations, they focused mainly on foreign agents and their activities in the United States.

== Leland Harrison and William Yale ==
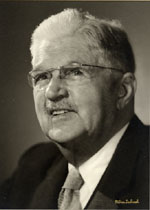
William Yale

The thirty-four-year-old [Leland] Harrison enjoyed a similar Yankee blueblood background to [William] Yale's. After being educated at Eton and Harvard, he'd joined the U.S. diplomatic corps and held a succession of posts at some of the most important American overseas missions. His swift rise had been cemented when Secretary of State Robert Lansing brought him to Washington in 1915, where Harrison quickly gained a reputation as Lansing's most trusted lieutenant.

Both fierce Anglophiles, Lansing and Harrison had shared a deepening disenchantment with Woodrow Wilson's commitment to American neutrality in the war. Another source of Lansing's favor for Harrison was undoubtedly his subordinate's profound sense of discretion. One State Department staffer would say of Leland Harrison:

"He was positively the most mysterious and secret man I have ever known. … He was almost a human sphinx, and when he did talk, his voice was so low that I had to strain my ears to catch the words."

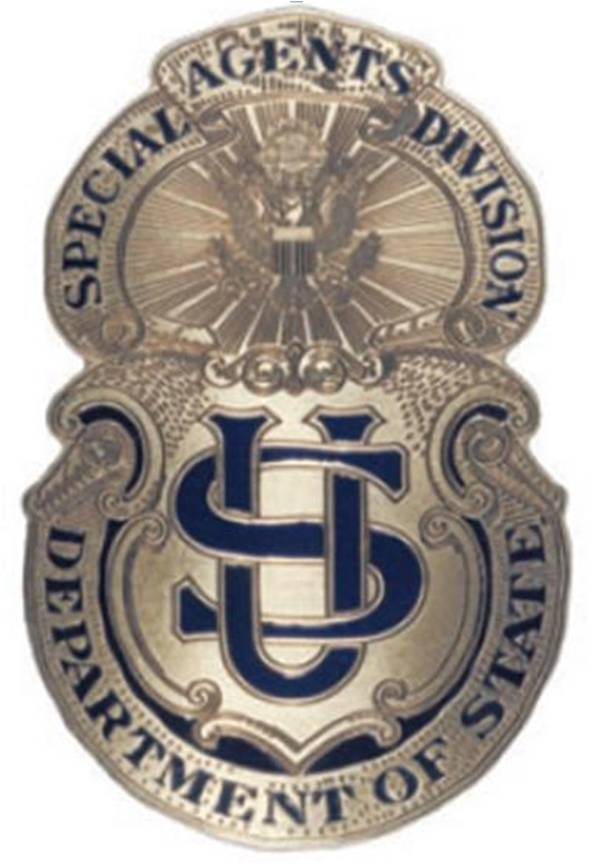
1916 Badge of the Bureau of Secret Intelligence, today's Diplomatic Security Service

Where this became significant was that prior to American entry in the war, Lansing had acted as the leader of a virtual shadow government within the Wilson administration, a secretive cabal that quietly maneuvered for intervention on the side of the Entente. Just how secretive was indicated by Lansing's creation of something called the Bureau of Secret Intelligence in 1916. In hopes of uncovering evidence of German treachery that would make the argument for intervention irresistible, the bureau's special agents spied on diplomats and businessmen from the Central Powers residing in the United States, an activity that obviously undercut Wilson's public vow of impartiality and would have infuriated other branches of government had they been told. But they weren't told. Instead, Lansing had used State Department discretionary funds to create the bureau, enabling it to operate without the approval or even the knowledge of Congress or most of the rest of Wilson's cabinet. Pulling Leland Harrison from the Latin American division, Lansing had placed his young protégé in charge of this "extra-legal" new office, tasked to overseeing "the collection and examination of all information of a secret nature." While this element of conspiracy within the State Department had been somewhat mooted by American entry into the war, it provided Harrison with a precedent when, upon reading William Yale's Syria report, it occurred to him that it might be very useful for the United States to have its own source of intelligence in the Middle East. The snag was that such an enterprise fell out of the purview of the existing domestic intelligence agencies and, with the United States not at war with Turkey, beyond the scope of the army intelligence division as well. The solution was to bring Yale in under the umbrella of the Bureau of Secret Intelligence; to that end, he was summoned to the State Department in early August.

At that meeting, Harrison put forward a remarkable proposition: Yale would return to the Middle East as a "special agent" for the State Department. At a salary of $2,000 a year plus expenses, his mission would be to monitor and report on whatever was happening that might be of interest to the American government—or, perhaps more accurately, of interest to Leland Harrison. From his base in Cairo, Yale would send weekly dispatches through the American embassy's diplomatic pouch to Washington, where they would be routed exclusively to Harrison's attention. Unsurprisingly, Yale quickly accepted the offer. On August 14, and under Secretary Lansing's signature, he was named the State Department's special agent for the Middle East.

After a brief trip home to see his family in Alder Creek, on August 29 Yale boarded USS New York in New York harbor for another transatlantic crossing. En route to Cairo, he was to stop off in London and Paris to take a sounding of those British and French officials most directly involved with Middle Eastern affairs. As Harrison cabled to the American ambassador in London:

"[Yale] is to keep us informed of the Near Eastern situation and, should the occasion arise, may be sent on trips for special investigation work. He is favorably known to the British authorities, who offered him a commission. Please do what you can to put him in touch with the right authorities."

In the second decade of the twenty-first century, it is difficult to fully grasp the utter provincialism of the United States as it entered World War I in 1917. Not only was its standing army one-twentieth the size of Germany's, but it was dwarfed in size by even some of Europe's smallest actors, including Romania, Bulgaria, and Portugal. In 1917, the entire Washington headquarters staff of the State Department fit into one wing of a six-story building adjacent to the White House, a structure it shared with the command staff of both the Departments of Navy and Army.

Those examples notwithstanding, perhaps more remarkable is this: for most of the remainder of the war, the American intelligence mission in the Middle East—a mission that would include the analysis of battlefield strategies and regional political currents, the interviewing of future heads of state, and the gathering of secrets against governments both friendly and hostile—would be conducted by a single twenty-nine-year-old man with no military, diplomatic, or intelligence training. To these deficiencies, William Yale could actually think of a few more:

"I lacked a historical knowledge of the background of the problems I was studying. I had no philosophy of history, no method of interpretation, and very little understanding of the fundamental nature and function of the [regional] economic and social system."

Not that any of this caused him undue anxiety. An exemplar of the American can-do spirit, William Yale also held to the belief, quite common among his countrymen, that ignorance and lack of experience could actually bestow an advantage, might serve as the wellspring for "originality and boldness." If so, he promised to be a formidable force in the Middle East.
