= Pink Dot HK =

LGBTQ event in Hong Kong

Pink Dot Hong Kong
- Nickname: Pink Dot HK
- Status: active
- Genre: LGBTQ
- Dates: 15 June 2014; 20 September 2015; 12 October 2025
- Frequency: Annually
- Location: Tamar Park
- Country: Hong Kong
- Years active: 12
- Inaugurated: 15 June 2014
- Most recent: 12 October 2025
- Previous event: 12 October 2025
- Attendance: 15,000
- Major events: Support for the LGBTQ community in Hong Kong
- Organiser: BigLove Alliance; Pink Alliance
- Website: pinkdothk.com

Pink Dot HK is an annual pride event held in Hong Kong since 2014, inspired by Pink Dot SG.

== History ==
=== 2014 ===
Inspired by Pink Dot Singapore, Pink Dot HK 2014 was held on 15 June 2014 in Tamar Park. Pink Dot HK was co-organized by the LGBT groups BigLove Alliance and Pink Alliance and ran under the theme "We Are Family: The Freedom to Love". The event included an outdoor picnic and funfair, as well as a closing concert featuring performers Denise Ho and Anthony Wong. The event was widely covered by local media, including the Oriental Daily News. Turnout was estimated at 12,000.

Before the event, the Bank of America Tower was decorated in pink to publicise the event.

=== 2015 ===
Pink Dot HK 2015 was held on 20 September 2015, once again at Tamar Park in front of the Central Government Complex. Notable attendees included actor Gregory Wong, singer Anthony Wong, singer Denise Ho, United States Consul General Clifford Hart, and Chairman of the Equal Opportunities Commission York Chow. Turnout was estimated at more than 15,000.

=== 2025 ===
On 31 July 2025, Pink Dot HK 2025 was cancelled after the West Kowloon Cultural District informed organizers the space would not be made available to them. The event was scheduled to be the 11th Pink Dot HK, held on 12 October 2025. In place of the carnival, Pink Dot held a livestreamed concert featuring performances and talks by activists, as well as a fashion show.

=== 2026 ===
On 18 May 2026, Pink Dot HK 2026 was again cancelled after difficulties in finding a venue for the event. The organisers were unable to rent out the planned venue due to 'licensing issues'.
