= Julius C. Holmes =

American diplomat (1899–1968)

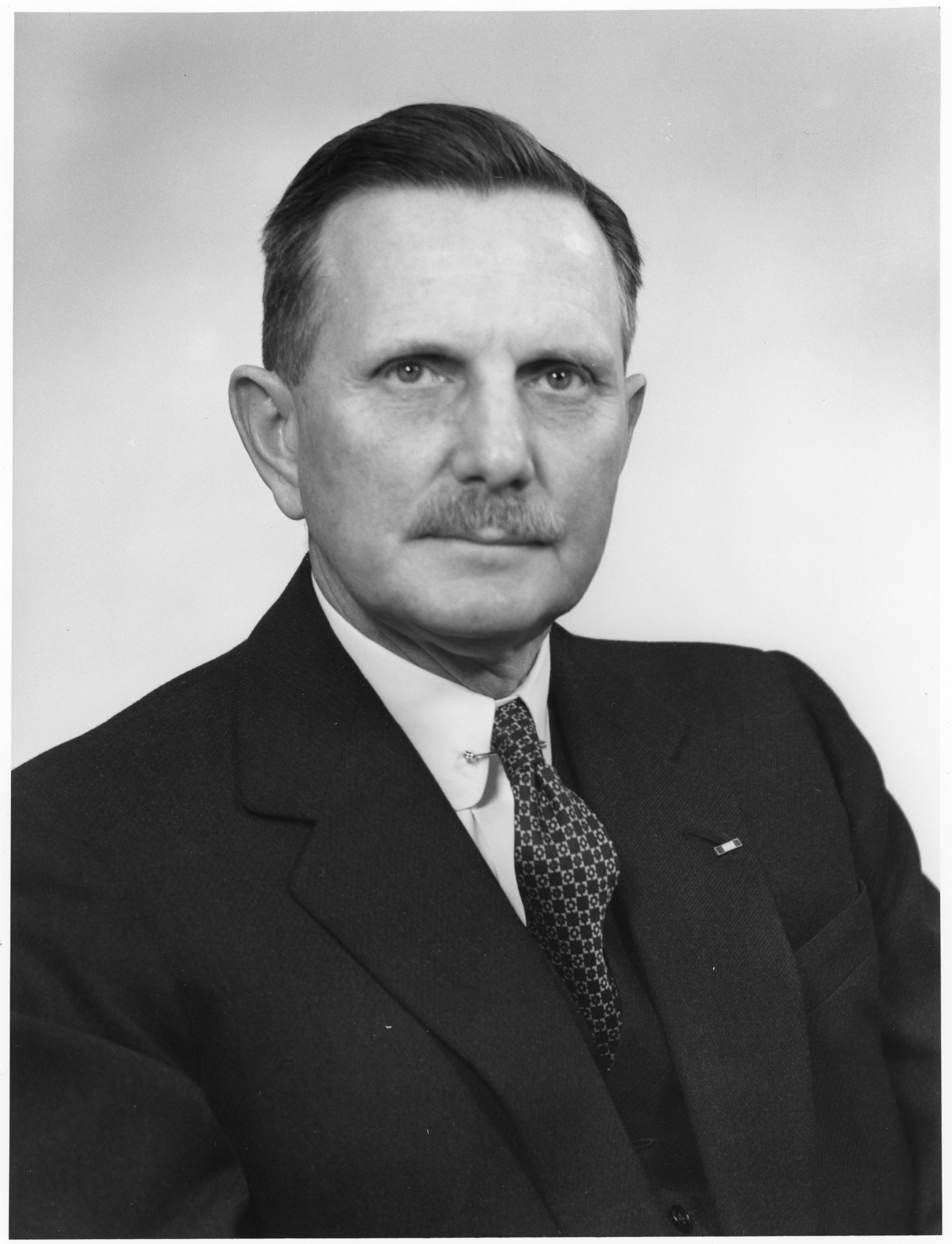
In 1950s

Julius Cecil Holmes (April 24, 1899 – July 14, 1968) was an American government official who served as the U.S. Ambassador to Iran.

== Early life and education ==
Holmes was born in Pleasanton, Kansas, and graduated from the University of Kansas in 1922.

== Career ==
=== World War II ===
In 1942, Holmes served as the executive officer for the U.S. Joint Chiefs of Staff. In order to set the forces committed to Operation Torch, the Allied invasion of French North Africa, he landed with Generals Mark W. Clark and Lyman Lemnitzer near Cherchell, Algeria, to meet secretly and set an accord with French resisters (as Jose Aboulker, Bernard Karsenty, Henri d'Astier de La Vigerie) and officers (General Charles Mast, Lieutenant Colonel Germain Jousse) in order to prevent the reaction of French Vychist armed forces and civil powers. This paved the way for the fast success of the November 8, 1942, landing of Allied Forces of World War II in Algiers, and then in the remaining of Algeria and in Morocco, that Winston Churchill called "the end of the beginning".

That same year (and until 1944), he served in the liaison section of the Allied Forces Headquarters (AFHQ).

In 1944, he served as Deputy G-5 for the Supreme Headquarters Allied Expeditionary Force (SHAEF) while simultaneously acting as the Assistant U.S. Secretary of State until 1945. He was promoted to brigadier general, U.S. Army in 1943.

=== Post–World War II ===
In 1953, Holmes was minister at the American Embassy in London. Two years later, in 1955, Holmes served as Ambassador to Iran, a position he reprised from 1961 to 1965.

From 1956 to 1959, Holmes was the special assistant to the U.S. Secretary of State for NATO Affairs. From 1959 to 1961, Holmes served as Consul General to Hong Kong.

== See also ==
- Robert Rossow, Jr.

Government offices
| Preceded by New Office | Assistant Secretary of State for Administration; January 29, 1945 – August 17, 1945 | Succeeded by Frank McCarthy |
Diplomatic posts
| Preceded by Edward T. Wailes | United States Ambassador to Iran; 1961–1965 | Succeeded by Armin H. Meyer |
| Preceded by John M. Steeves | United States Consul General to Hong Kong and Macau; 1959–1961 | Succeeded by Sam P. Gilstrap |
