= David Schlaefer =

American diplomat and author

David Allen Schlaefer
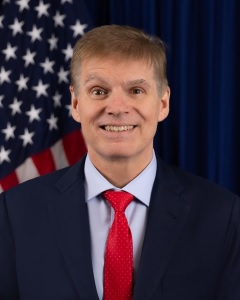
- Official Portrait, 2024

Deputy Counsel General of the U.S. Mission in Hong Kong
- President: Donald Trump

Personal details
- Born: Texas, U.S.
- Education: Baylor University (BSFS & MAIR); The University of Texas at Austin (Ph.D.)
- Website: https://hk.usconsulate.gov/deputy-consul-general/

David Allen Schlaefer is an American career diplomat and author. He is a member of the Senior Foreign Service in the United States Foreign Service and the current Deputy Counsel General at the U.S. Mission in Hong Kong. Schlaefer has served on previous diplomatic missions to Brazil, Finland, Iraq, Japan, Mexico, Romania, Poland, and Ukraine. Schlaefer is also an author of a series of books based on Finnish mythology.

== Early life and career ==
Schlaefer was born in Texas and grew up in the Rio Grande Valley where his family worked in the citrus industry. He received his education from Baylor University and the University of Texas at Austin. Schlaefer later taught at the Hong Kong Baptist College (now the Hong Kong Baptist University) during the mid-90s.

From 2009 to 2010, Schlaefer served in a Provincial Reconstruction Team with the 3rd Brigade Combat Team in southern Iraq. He was awarded the Commander’s Award for Civilian Service for his services.

In 2011, Schlaefer was appointed Director for Political-Military Affairs at the U.S. Embassy in Tokyo and was part of the negotiating team for the revision of the US-Japan Defense Guideline. Schlaefer later served as the Deputy Special Envoy for the Global Coalition to Defeat ISIS and Deputy Coordinator for Counterterrorism in Washington.

Schlaefer was then appointed as the Senior Assistance Coordinator at the U.S. Embassy in Kyiv. He later helped to reopen the embassy in June 2022 during Russia's invasion of Ukraine and reestablished its operations as the Acting Deputy Chief of Mission.

Schlaefer was later posted as the Deputy Counsel General at the U.S. Consulate General in Hong Kong, and was the Charge D’Affaires upon the previous Counsel General Gregory May's reassignment to Beijing in July 2025. He held this role until the new Counsel General, Julie Eadeh, was appointed in August 2025. He continues in serving as the Deputy Counsel General following Eadeh's appointment.

== Personal life ==
Schlaefer is married to his wife, a professional interpreter and translator, and has two children. They all currently reside in Hong Kong. Schlaefer has also written of a series of books based on Finnish mythology.

== The Far Northern Land Saga ==
Schlaefer is the author of The Far Northern Land Saga, a three-book epic fantasy series inspired by Finnish folklore, mythology, and the Kalevala. The Saga is notable for its blending of mythological characters from Finnish folklore like Väinämöinen, Lemminkäinen, and Mielikki with original characters, such as Ulla Karhulainen and Prince Egan. The story centers around Ulla and Väinämöinen's epic struggle against the sorceress Löhi to protect the Seven Clans of mortal men in Iron-Age Finland. The series consists of The Mark of the Bear Clan (Book 1), The Heir of Lemminkäinen (Book 2), and The Queen of Pohjola (Book 3).
