= John Hale Stutesman =

American State Department official (1920–2019)

John Hale Stutesman jr (December 16, 1920 – June 9, 2019) was an American State Department official, who served as a consular at the American embassy in Shanghai during 1946, a political officer at the embassy in Tehran from 1949 to 1952, later he was posted to Paris, followed by NATO, DCM at the embassy in La Paz, Bolivia and U.S. general consul of Canada in 1974. He also served as Associate Dean of the Foreign Service Institute and Chairman of the Editorial Board of the Foreign Service Journal.

== Early life and military service ==
Stutesman was born in Washington, D.C. in December 1920, the son of Colonel John Hale Stutesman Sr. (1883–1966) and Virginia Stutesman (née Gerhardt, 1891–1981). In 1930 he was living at Fort Leavenworth Military Reservation in Kansas with parents. For junior & senior years high school he attended Lawrenceville School, graduating with Class of 1938 for which he composed 1938 Class Poem. He then attended Princeton University, graduating in 1942. Following graduation he enlisted in the army in the 88th Infantry Division. Stutesman fought in the Italian Campaign in the field artillery unit.

== State Department career ==
Following his discharge from the army in 1946, he joined the foreign service. He was first assigned to the Far East where he served as a political officer and a council at the United States embassy in Shanghai. He stayed in Shanghai until the Communist victory in the Chinese Civil War. Stutesman then was assigned to the Embassy of the United States, Tehran from 1949 to 1952. In 1974, Stutesman was the United States general council in Canada.

== Later life and death ==
Hale latterly lived in San Francisco with his wife. He died in San Francisco, California in June 2019 at the age of 98 and was buried in his hometown of Washington D.C.
