= Robert Rossow Jr. =

Deputy Consul of the United States of America in Iran, Tabriz, 1945

Robert Rossow, Jr.
- Born: 1919; Indiana, United States
- Occupation: Diplomat
- Known for: The Battle of Azerbaijan, 1946
- Title: Deputy of Embassy of the United States of America in Tabriz; Head of the Political Department of the US Embassy in Tehran
- Parents: Robert Col Rossow (father); Ethel Rossow (mother)

Robert Rossow, Jr. (born 1919 in Indiana) was the Deputy of the Embassy of the United States of America in Tabriz, Iran, where he served from December 1945 to June 1946. He then headed the Political Department of the US Embassy in Tehran until January 1947.

He served as US Deputy Consul in Panama in 1943. He also served on a United States Department of State mission in Bulgaria in 1947. From 1949 to 1951, he was US Deputy Consul in Chennai, India.

During his charge in the Tabriz US Consulate, when the Azerbaijani Democratic Party ruled in this city, he observed the movements and activities of the Red Army in Tabriz and transmitted all the secret operations of the Soviet Union forces in Azerbaijan to the United States moment by moment.

== The Battle of Azerbaijan ==
Some of his confidential reports to the US government have been published in the book "The Battle of Azerbaijan, 1946". The book is based on an article by Robert Rossow, Jr. himself published in The Middle East Journal in the winter of 1956.

== See also ==
- Julius C. Holmes
- Charles C. Hart
- Azerbaijan People's Government
- Mahmoud Ahmadinejad's letter to George W. Bush
- Deportation of the Iranian students at US airports
- Correspondence between Barack Obama and Ali Khamenei
