= Kurt Tong =

American diplomat (born 1962)

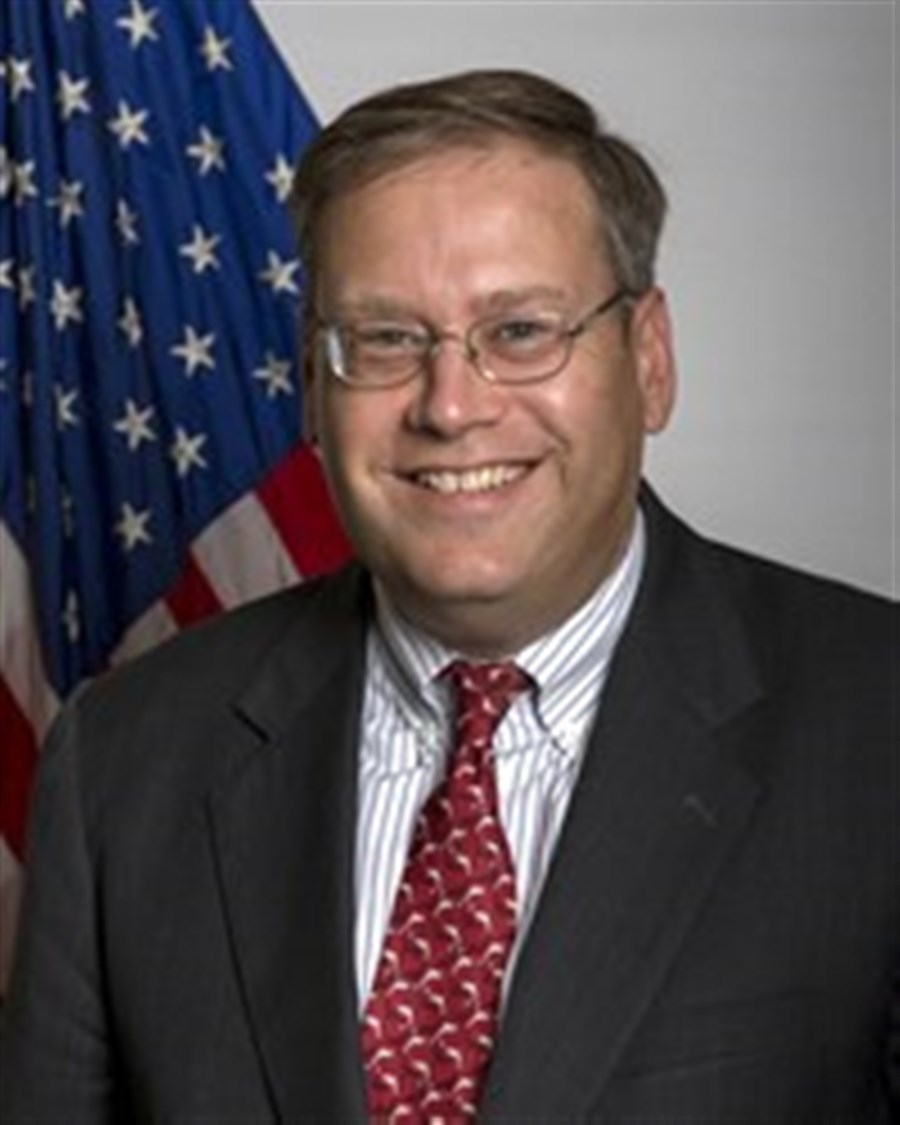

United States Consul General to Hong Kong and Macau
- In office August 27, 2016 – June 30, 2019
- President: Barack Obama; Donald Trump
- Preceded by: Clifford Hart
- Succeeded by: Hanscom Smith

Personal details
- Born: Kurt Walter Tong; 1962 (age 63–64) Ohio
- Education: Princeton University (AB)

Chinese name
- Traditional Chinese: 唐偉康
- Simplified Chinese: 唐伟康
Transcriptions
Standard Mandarin
- Hanyu Pinyin: Táng Wěikāng
- Wade–Giles: T'ang^{2} Wei^{3}-k'ang^{1}

Kurt Walter Tong (born 1962) is an American businessman and former diplomat. He was Consul General of the United States of America to Hong Kong and Macau during the Umbrella Revolution. He joined The Asia Group in July 2019 and is a Managing Partner at the firm.

== Early life and education ==
Tong was born in Ohio and raised in Massachusetts, graduating from Mount Greylock Regional High School in 1981. He graduated with an A.B. from the Woodrow Wilson School of Public and International Affairs at Princeton University in 1987. He studied at the Beijing Institute of Education, Inter-University Program for Chinese Language Study, Inter-University Center for Japanese Language Studies, and International Christian University. He is fluent in Mandarin and Japanese.

== Career ==
Tong previously was Principal Deputy Assistant Secretary of the Department of State's Bureau of Economic and Business Affairs and replaced Clifford Hart in Hong Kong in August 2016. He arrived in Hong Kong on August 27, 2016, to assume his position as the Consul General.

Tong was the Senate-confirmed U.S. Ambassador for Asia-Pacific Economic Cooperation (APEC) when the United States hosted the forum in 2011. He was the Deputy Chief of Mission for the United States Embassy in Tokyo, Japan from 2011 to 2014. Earlier, he was Director for Korean Affairs at the U.S. Department of State, and Director for Asian Economic Affairs at the White House, and participated in the Six Party Talks with North Korea. He also worked at the U.S. embassies in Seoul, Beijing, Tokyo and Manila.

Diplomatic posts
| Preceded by Clifford Hart | United States Consul General to Hong Kong and Macau; 2016–2019 | Succeeded by Hanscom Smith |
