= Malewezi =

Malewezi is a surname. Notable people with the surname include:

- Justin Malewezi (1943–2021), Malawian politician
- Qabaniso Malewezi (born 1979), Malawian poet and musician, son of Justin
