= Consulate General of the United States, Hong Kong and Macau =

American diplomatic mission

Consulate General of the United States, Hong Kong and Macau 美國駐香港及澳門總領事館

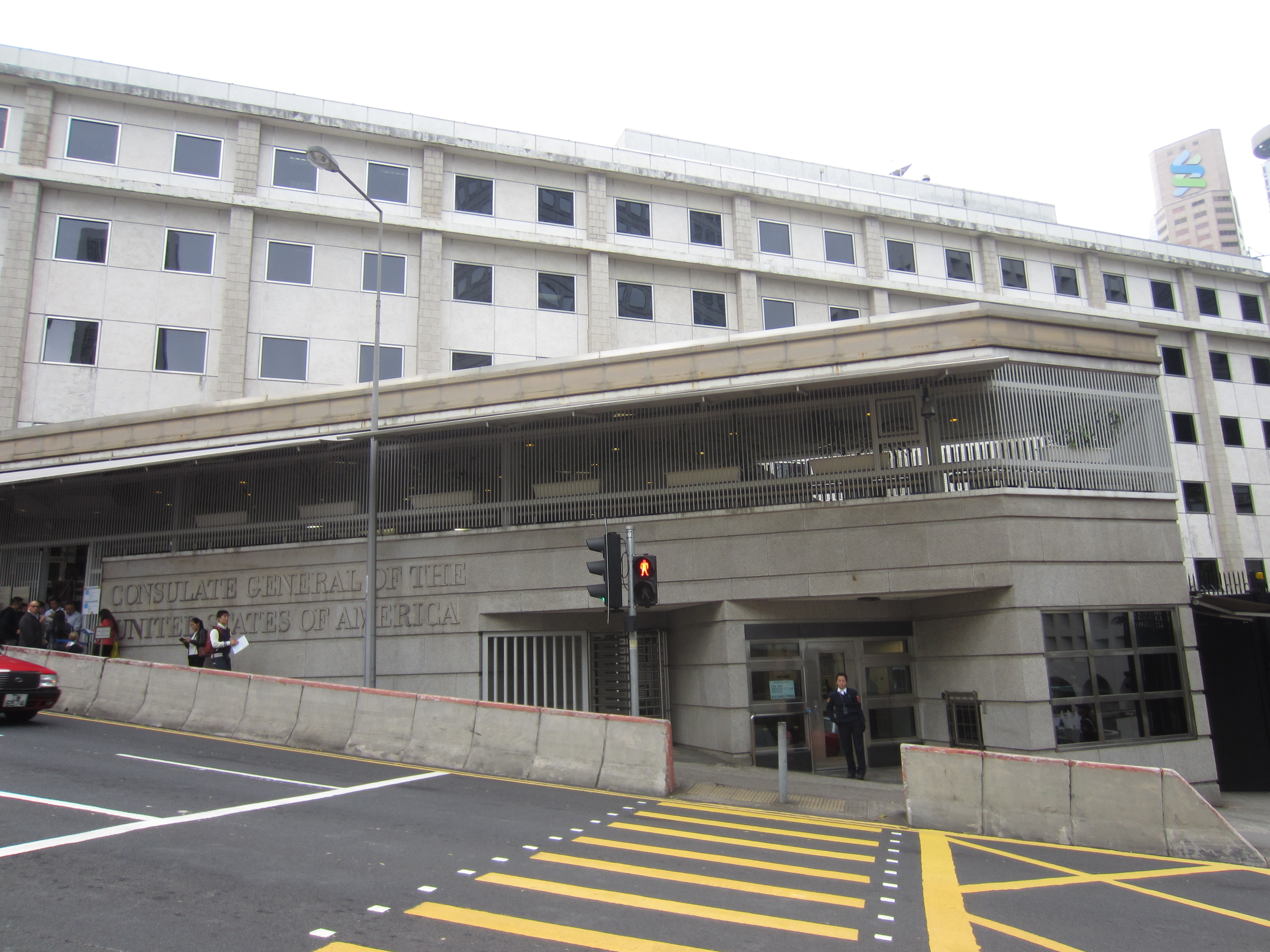
- Address: No. 26, Garden Road, Central, Hong Kong Island, Hong Kong
- Consul General: Julie Eadeh

Consulate General of the United States, Hong Kong and Macau

Chinese name
- Traditional Chinese: 美國駐香港及澳門總領事館
- Simplified Chinese: 美国驻香港及澳门总领事馆
Transcriptions
Standard Mandarin
- Hanyu Pinyin: Měiguó zhù Xiānggǎng jí Àomén Zǒnglǐngshìguǎn
Yue: Cantonese
- Jyutping: mei5 gwok3 zyu3 hoeng1 gong2 kap6 ou3 mun4*2 zung2 ling5 si6 gun2

Portuguese name
- Portuguese: Consulado Geral dos Estados Unidos da América, Hong Kong e Macau

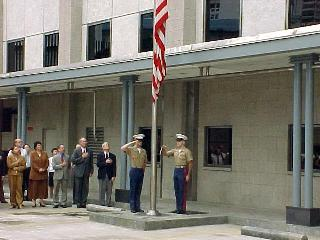
On May 12, 1999, the flag at the Consulate-General of the United States in Hong Kong was lowered in respect and sorrow for the people of China for a day as the aircraft carrying the bodies of victims of the NATO bombing of the People's Republic of China embassy in Belgrade came home to Beijing. Similar gestures were done in Chengdu, Guangzhou, Shanghai, and Shenyang, along with the U.S. embassy in Beijing.

The Consulate General of the United States, Hong Kong and Macau, represents the United States in Hong Kong and Macau.

It has been located at 26 Garden Road, Central, Hong Kong Island, Hong Kong, since the late 1950s. The consul general is Julie A. Eadeh, who has served since August 2025.

Due to Hong Kong and Macau's special status, and in accordance with the United States–Hong Kong Policy Act, the U.S. consulate general to Hong Kong operates as an independent mission, with the consul general as the "chief of mission" (with title of "ambassador)". The consul general to Hong Kong and Macau is not under the jurisdiction of the United States ambassador to China, and reports directly to the U.S. Department of State as do other chiefs of mission, who are ambassadors in charge of embassies.

All recent consuls-general are at the career minister rank in the U.S. Senior Foreign Service, whereas many other ambassadors are only minister counsellor.

== History ==
Diplomatic relations started in 1843, when the Americans established a consulate in Hong Kong with the consul working out of his residence. 9 Ice House Street (now The Galleria) began hosting the consulate in the early 1920s, and later the 1935 Hong Kong and Shanghai Bank Building became the consulate's home on the second floor. During World War II, the Americans gave the occupying Japanese army the key to the office, and after the war, the key was returned and nothing was damaged in the office. However, the consul general's residence on The Peak was blown up during the war, and the Japanese used bricks from the building to create a memorial.

In December 1945, the Americans and British signed the Lend-Lease Settlement Statement, an agreement designed to help the British cover post-war costs by allowing the U.S. to buy land on British colonies for government or education uses. Land discussions between the U.S. consul general and Hong Kong governor began in 1946, when the Republic of China was in control of mainland China. The Americans were offered the 26 Garden Road site, a plot of land measuring 47,000 square feet (4,400 m^{2}), and in March 1947, the Americans let the Hong Kong government know that it would like to purchase the site under the Lend-Lease Settlement Statement. The approval was granted three months later, and in 1954, construction plans were announced. Construction was finished in June 1957, and the land lease was signed in 1960.

In the lease, an option to purchase the land as a freehold was included. In January 1997, the U.S. wanted to exercise this option, but the proposal was rejected in favor of a 999-year lease, backdated to start on 9 April 1950. The U.S. has the longest lease in all of the People's Republic of China, as the last 999-year lease granted before this was in 1903, meaning the consulate has 47 more years of length than the next newest 999-year lease.

In June 2013, NSA whistleblower Edward Snowden claims that there is a CIA station inside the U.S. consulate general in Hong Kong, and later both the U.S. consulate and Hong Kong officials declined to comment.

In March 2021, two employees from the consulate, a married couple living in Dynasty Court Tower 3, were discovered to have COVID-19 (cases 11319 and 11320). Their three-year-old daughter was also found to be infected, closing her preschool, Woodland Montessori Academy. Some mainland Chinese and pro-Beijing news reports, including from Dot Dot News, Global Times, and others, claimed that the family used diplomatic immunity to avoid quarantine, which both the United States and Carrie Lam denied; Lam stated that the children were sent to the hospital to join their parents. The pro-Beijing Federation of Trade Unions and Democratic Alliance for the Betterment and Progress staged protests at the consulate, believing that the family had invoked diplomatic immunity.

In 2020, the mainland Chinese government required the U.S. consul general to obtain permission from China's Foreign Ministry in Hong Kong before meeting with local government officials or local government educational institutions; in 2023, the rule was changed so that the U.S. consul general now had to provide 5 days of advanced notice.

== Information ==
In the May 2012 Office of Inspector General's report on the consulate, the following statistics were provided on its operations:

- 60,000 U.S. citizens live in Hong Kong and Macau
- For FY 2011, the workload included approximately 8,000 passport adjudications, 3,600 immigrant visas, 65,000 nonimmigrant visa applications, 900 consular reports of birth abroad, and 170 renunciations.

In the newer November 2017 Office of Inspector General's report on the consulate, the following statistics were provided on its operations for Financial Year 2016:

- 125 U.S. direct-hire employees
- 25 Locally Employed Americans (including eligible family members)
- 188 Locally Employed foreign national staff
- FY 2016 operating budget of $40.6M USD

FY 2016 staffing and funding
Agency	U.S. direct hire staff	U.S. locally employed staff	Foreign national staff	TOTAL	Funding ($ USD)
Department of State	85	23	155	263	29,491,535
Department of Agriculture	1	0	6	7	1,047,077
Department of Commerce	3	0	13	16	2,522,799
Department of Defense	12	0	3	15	2,096,511
Department of Justice	11	0	1	12	2,024,010
Department of Homeland Security	11	1	10	22	3,101,604
Department of the Treasury	2	0	1	3	290,456
TOTAL	125	25	188	338	40,573,992

Within the consulate, several U.S. agencies operate, including the Department of Homeland Security (Secret Service, Immigration and Customs Enforcement, Customs and Border Protection), the Department of Defense, and Department of Justice (Drug Enforcement Agency, Federal Bureau of Investigation), and the Department of the Treasury (Internal Revenue Service).

== Physical locations ==
The consulate building is located at 26 Garden Road. There is an on-site gymnasium in the building.

The consulate's warehouse is located at 11/F, 14/F, and 15/F at Leader Centre, 37 Wong Chuk Hang Rd.

The consul-general lives on The Peak at 3 Barker Road, paid for by American taxpayers. The site includes a garage and tennis court.

In addition, the consulate owns employee residences on 37 Shouson Hill Road, where a private shuttle takes employees to the consulate building. In May 2020, the consulate announced it would accept bids in an attempt to sell the six mansions, and with an agreement to re-lease them. The mansions contain up to 10 bedrooms each, and measure 47,382 ft^{2} (4,401.9 m^{2}) in total. Bids are estimated to value the property between HKD $3.1 billion – $5 billion. In February 2021, the property was given approval from Beijing for a sale at HKD $2.6 billion to Hang Lung Properties. The property was bought in June 1948 for an unknown price, and construction of the buildings was completed in 1983.

There are also 13 employee residences and 14 parking lots at Wilshire Park, 12–14 Macdonnell Road. In addition, the United States also owns one unit at Grenville House, and one unit at Hangking Court, 43 Cloud View Road.

== List of U.S. consuls-general for Hong Kong and Macau ==
- Thomas W. Waldron (consul, 1843–1844)
- Frederick Busch (consul 1845–1853)
- Henry Anthon (vice consul and occasionally acting consul, 1850–1854)
- James Keenan (consul 1854–61)
- Horace N. Congar (consul 1862–1865)
- Isaac Jackson Allen (consul 1865–1869)
- Colonel C.N. Golding (consul 1869–1870)
- David H. Bailey (consul 1870–1877)
- Dr. Robert Morris Tindall (consul 1874)
- H. Selden Loring (vice consul 1874)
- John S. Mosby (1878–1885)
  - Beverly Clarke Mosby (vice & deputy consul 1884)
- Robert E. Withers (1885–1889)
- Oliver H. Simons (consul 1889–1893)
- William E. Hunt (consul 1893–1897)
- Rounsevelle Wildman (consul general 1897–1901)
  - John A. Hunt (vice & deputy consul 1897)
  - Edwin Wildman (vice & deputy consul general 1898)
- William Alvah Rublee (1901–1902)
- Edward S. Bragg (1903–1906)
  - Harry M. Hobbins (vice & deputy consul general 1904–05)
- Wilbur T. Gracey (vice & deputy consul general 1905–06)
  - Stuart J. Fuller (vice consul 1906–10)
- Amos Parker Wilder (consul general 1906–09)
- George E. Anderson (consul general 1910–20)
  - Algar E. Carleton (vice & deputy consul general 1910–11)
  - John B. Sawyer (vice consul 1911–14)
- John B. Sawyer (vice consul 1915–17)
  - Leighton Hope (vice consul 1917)
  - Algar E. Carleton (vice consul 1917)
  - Hugh S. Miller (vice consul 1921–22)
  - Verne S. Staten (vice consul 1921)
- Leighton Hope (consul 1921)
- William H. Gale (consul general 1921–24)
  - William J. McCafferty (vice consul 1921–23)
  - John B. Sawyer (vice consul 1921)
  - Francis O. Seidle (vice consul 1922)
- William J. McCafferty (consul 1923)
  - Leroy Webber (vice consul 1924)
- William J. McCafferty (consul 1924)
  - Maurice Walk (vice consul 1924)
  - Jake R. Summers (vice consul 1924)
- Roger C. Tredwell (consul general 1925–29)
- Lynn W. Franklin (consul 1925)
  - John J. Muccio (vice consul 1926)
- Harold Shantz (consul 1926–29)
  - Kenneth C. Krentz (vice consul 1926–32)
- Lynn W. Franklin (consul 1926–27)
- John J. Muccio (consul 1927–29)
  - Perry N. Jester (vice consul 1928–31)
  - Cecil B. Lyon (vice consul 1932)
  - Donald D. Edgar (vice consul 1932)
- John R. Putnam (consul 1932)
  - George Bliss Lane (vice consul 1932)
- Douglas Jenkins (consul general 1932)
- Addison E. Southard (consul general November 5, 1937 – June 30, 1942)
- Karl L. Rankin (October 1949 – August 1950)
- Walter P. McConaughy (August 1950 – June 1952)
- Julian F. Harrington (July 1952 – December 1954)
- Everett F. Drumright (December 1954 – March 1958)
- James Pilcher (March 1958 – March 1959)
- John M. Steeves (March 1959 – August 1959)
- Ambassador Julius C. Holmes (September 1959 – March 1961)
- Sam P. Gilstrap (April 1961 – October 1961)
- Marshall Green (November 1961 – August 1963)
- Edward E. Rice (February 1964 – September 1967)
- Edwin W. Martin (October 1967 – July 1970)
- David L. Osborn (August 1970 – March 1974)
- Ambassador Charles T. Cross (March 1974 – September 1977)
- Thomas P. Shoesmith (October 1977 – October 1981)
- Burton Levin (February 1982 – July 1986)
- Donald M. Anderson (July 1986 – June 1990)
- Ambassador Richard L. Williams (June 1990 – June 1993)
- Richard W. Mueller (June 1993 – July 1996)
- Ambassador Richard A. Boucher (August 1996 – July 1999)
- Ambassador Michael Klosson (August 1999 – July 2002)
- James R. Keith (August 2002 – April 2005)
- Ambassador James B. Cunningham (4 August 2005 – July 2008)
- Ambassador Joseph R. Donovan Jr. (August 2008 – July 2009)
- Christopher J. Marut (acting consul general) (July 2009 – February 2010)
- Ambassador Stephen M. Young (March 2010 – July 2013)
- Ambassador Clifford A. Hart (July 2013 – July 2016)
- Ambassador Kurt W. Tong (August 2016 – July 2019)
- Ambassador Hanscom Smith (July 2019 – July 2022)
- Ambassador Gregory May (September 2022 – July 2025)
- David Schlaefer (Chargé d'affaires) (June 2025 – August 2025)
- Julie Eadeh (August 2025 – present)

== List of U.S. deputy consuls general (deputy principal officers) of the consulate general in Hong Kong and Macau ==
- Leo J. Moser (1954–1956)
- Sam P. Gilstrap (1959 – circa 1962)
- John A. Lacey (1962 – ?)
- Oscar Vance Armstrong (1964–1966)
- Allen S. Whiting (1966–1968)
- Harald W. Jacobson (? – 1970)
- David Dean (1970–1974)
- Norman W. Getsinger (1974–1976)
- Roger W. Sullivan (1976–1977)
- Burton Levin (1977–1978)
- Natale H. Bellocchi (1979–1981)
- Richard Llewellyn Williams (1981–1985)
- Arthur L. Kobler (1985–1989)
- David G. Brown (1989–1992)
- Jeffrey A. Bader (circa 1992 – 1995)
- Stephen Schlaikjer (circa 1996 – 1998)
- John Medeiros (August 1998 – 2001)
- Kenneth H. Jarrett (July 2001 – 2004)
- Marlene J. Sakaue (July 2004 – 2007)
- Christopher J. Marut (July 2007 – 2010)
- Matthew J. Matthews (2010–2013)
- Tom Cooney (August 2013 – 2016)
- Thomas Mark Hodges (2016–2019)
- Paul D. Horowitz (2019–2021)
- Colin Crosby (July 2021 – 2024)
- David Allen Schlaefer (2024 - present)

== See also ==
- British Consulate-General, Hong Kong
- Canadian Consulate-General, Hong Kong (Commission of Canada, Hong Kong prior to 1997)
- Consular missions in Hong Kong
- Diplomatic missions of the United States
- Hong Kong–United States relations
- United States–Hong Kong Policy Act
- Americans in Hong Kong
- Americans in China
