= Iraq leak =

Political scandal in Finland in 2003

The Iraq leak (also Iraq-gate, or the Iraq scandal) is a series of events that began on 6 March 2003 from a statement given by Anneli Jäätteenmäki, leader of the Finnish Centre Party, in a televised election debate prior to the 2003 parliamentary election. Jäätteenmäki accused Paavo Lipponen, the then Prime Minister of Finland, of attaching Finland to George W. Bush's 'coalition of the willing' that was in preparation for the 2003 war in Iraq. Lipponen had visited Washington on 9 December 2002.

According to Jäätteenmäki, Finland had taken part in a meeting where 'those countries that had promised cooperation and aid' had been invited. It was later discovered that Jäätteenmäki had acquired the information from secret foreign ministry documents, which she had received from Martti Manninen, an advisor to the President of Finland and a member of Jäätteenmäki's party.

Prime Minister Lipponen's actions were suggested to be influenced by the fact that Finland was about to sell AMOS mortars to the U.S. military as part of its Land Warrior program.

The Left Alliance member of parliament Jaakko Laakso, together with other representatives, had posted a public question on Lipponen's statements in Washington already on 19 December 2002. There was no public inquiry on the matter, even though the documents cast doubt on the legality of mortar deals during the 2001 war in Afghanistan. The Green member Ulla Anttila and others questioned an authorisation to export arms that was granted to Patria-Hägglunds shortly before the war started.

The Centre Party won the parliamentary election and became the largest party in the Parliament. Jäätteenmäki was appointed Prime Minister of Finland by President Tarja Halonen on 17 April 2003. However, the lack of confidence in Jäätteenmäki caused by her use of secret documents in the campaign and her flat-out denial before the Parliament of having solicited them, despite incriminating evidence, forced her to resign as Prime Minister on 24 June. Jäätteenmäki claimed to have received the documents unexpectedly and without solicitation, which Manninen denied. A new cabinet was formed by Matti Vanhanen, who also became the leader of the Centre Party. Manninen was also sacked from his job as advisor to the president.

On 19 December 2003, criminal charges were pressed against Martti Manninen for leaking secret documents and against Anneli Jäätteenmäki for incitement and aid to the same. Manninen was found guilty, and had to pay 80 day fines, but Jäätteenmäki was not found guilty, as she did not specifically request the documents.

David Schlaefer, spokesperson for the U.S. Embassy in Helsinki, denied in 2003 after Jäätteenmäki's resignation that there was ever any understanding on cooperation or assistance between Finland and the U.S. during Lipponen's meetings in Washington, stating at a conference at University of Helsinki that "it is simply not true, it did not happen."
