= Phindu Zaie Banda =

Malawian poet

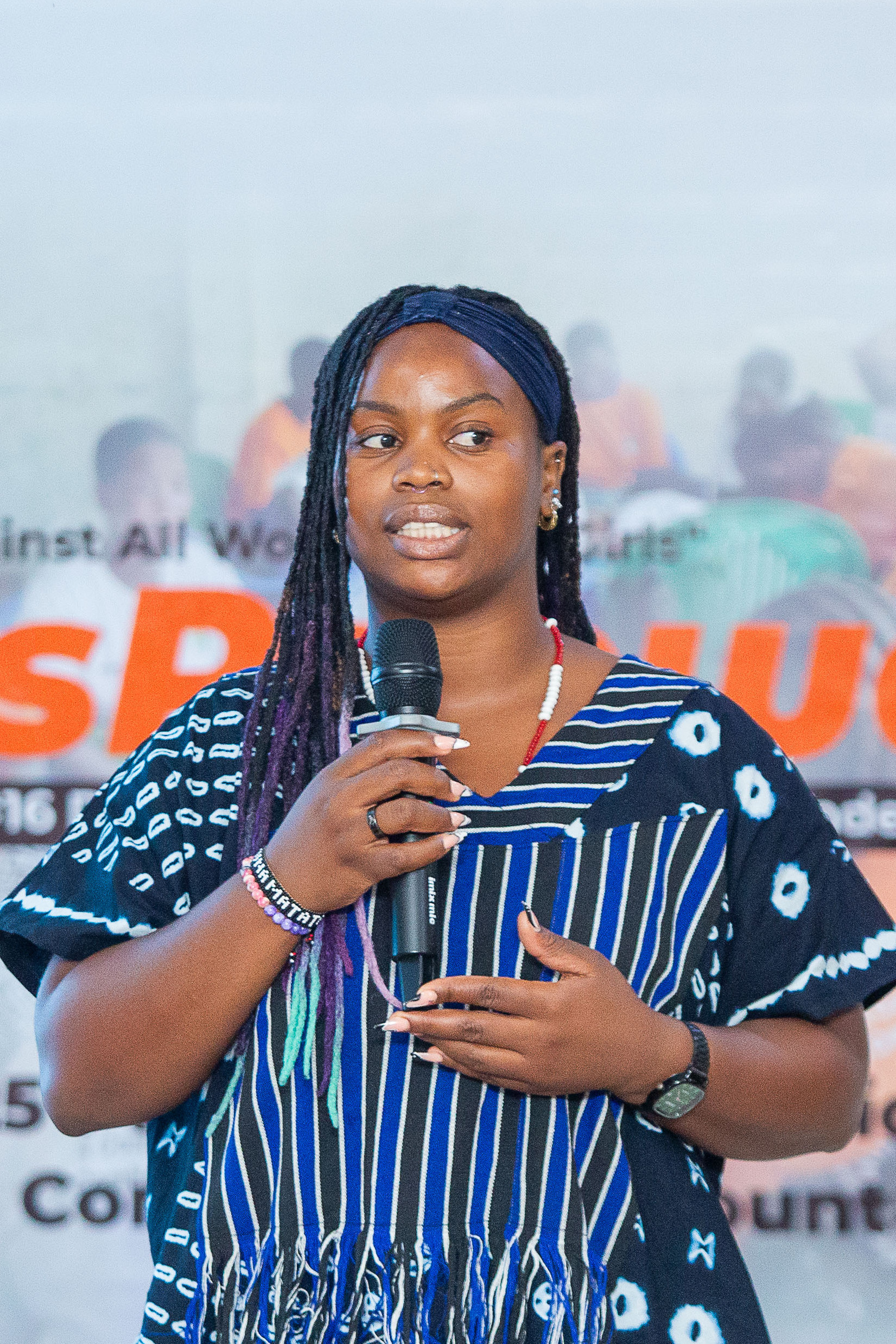
- Banda in 2025
- Born: c. 1998
- Occupation: poet

Phindu Zaie Banda or Phindu Zaiebanda (born c. 1998) is a Malawian poet and member of the Sapitwa poet group.

== Life ==
Banda was born in about 1998.

In 2016, fellow Malawian poet Qabaniso Malewezi published his audio poetry collection People. Banda was a supporting act at its launch. Banda described herself as having always thought of herself as a writer. She said that she was surprised by her own success. Banda stated that she typically spends about a week developing the idea for a new poem before writing a draft, which she then revises the following day.

Banda is a member of the Sapitwa poet group of spoken word performers. Sapitwa is the highest peak in Malawi and its name means 'a place where people do not go'. In 2017, Sapitwa took part in the #16daysofactivism against gender-based violence. The "art for a cause" event was led by Sapitwa poet Robert Chiwamba, with daily readings of poems. The final event, held on 17 December in Lilongwe, attracted a paying audience to hear their poetry.

Banda was among a growing number of women performing at the 2019 Tumaini Arts Festival in Dzaleka Refugee Camp and she expressed support for the festival's aims.

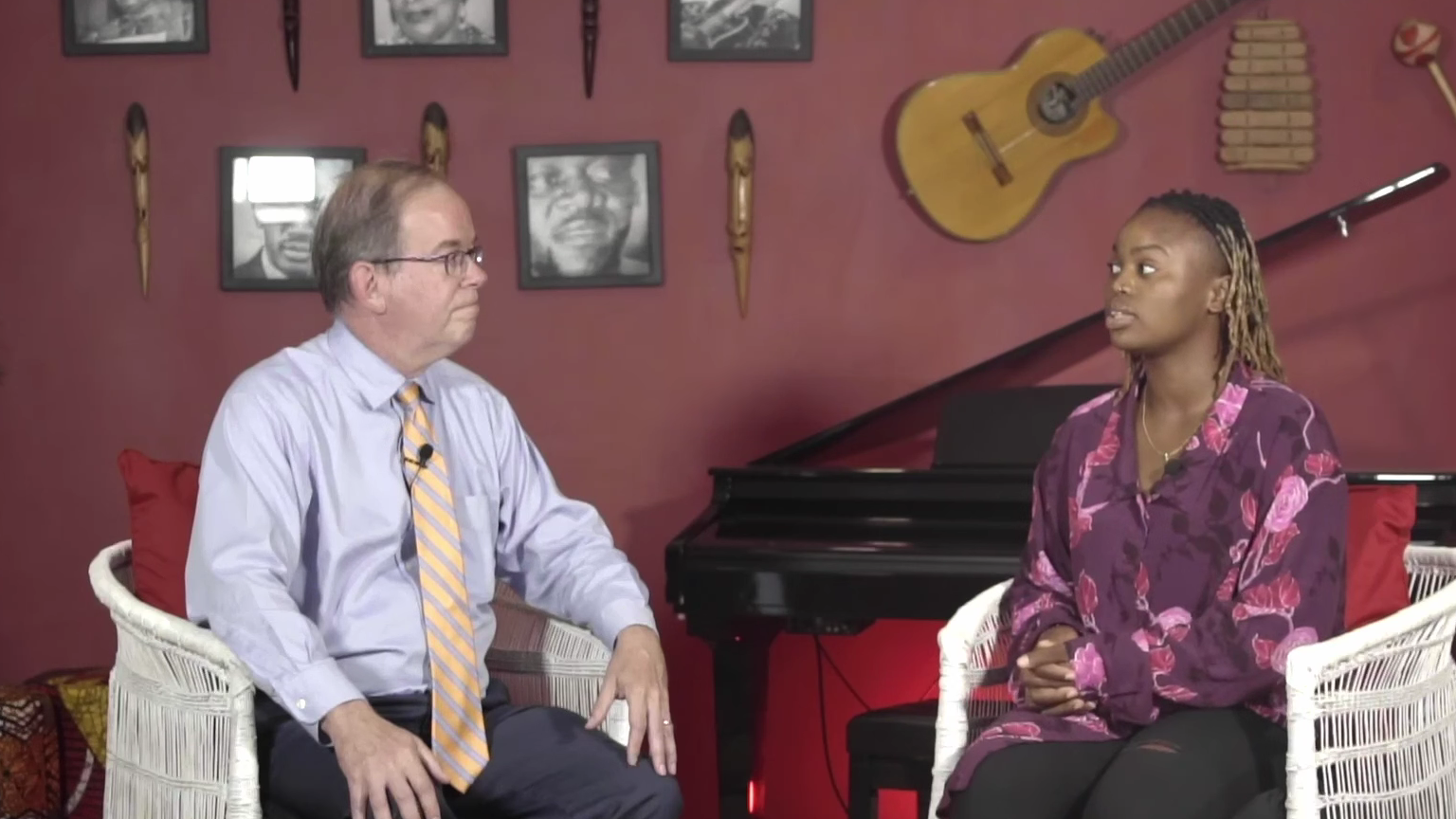
Banda in an interview by the US ambassador David Young about #16DaysOfActivism

In 2021, Malewezi launched a series of poetry events titled Stripped. Banda supported the initiative, describing it as a "fresh and interesting" series of events. Later that year, she performed poetry at an on Africa Day event funded by the Embassy of Ireland and Irish Aid.

In 2023, Standard Bank Malawi funded Banda to perform her poem "NTHOWA" as part of a campaign highlighting Malawi's progress and investment. That year, she was also interviewed by U.S. Ambassador David Young as part of that year's #16daysofactivism campaign.

On the 60th anniversary of Independence in 2024, Banda was among four poets performing live via Facebook. They were supported by a host and sponsored by the Standard Bank. The other three were Q Malewezi, Nyamalikiti Nthiwatiwa and Wanga. In the same year, she travelled to New York to represent ActionAid Malawi's Young Urban Women's Network at the 68th session of the United Nations Commission on the Status of Women, held at United Nations Headquarters.
