= John A. Burroughs Jr. =

American diplomat (1936–2014)

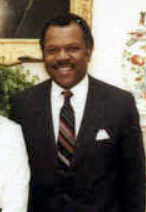
- Burroughs in 1981

United States Ambassador to Uganda
- In office August 12, 1988 – August 28, 1991
- President: Ronald Reagan; George H. W. Bush
- Preceded by: Robert Gordon Houdek
- Succeeded by: Johnnie Carson

United States Ambassador to Malawi
- In office May 7, 1981 – June 9, 1984
- President: Ronald Reagan
- Preceded by: Harold E. Horan
- Succeeded by: Weston Adams

Personal details
- Born: July 31, 1936 Washington, D.C., U.S.
- Died: September 11, 2014 (aged 78)
- Education: University of Iowa
- Profession: Career Diplomat

John Andrew Burroughs Jr. (July 31, 1936 – September 11, 2014) was the United States Ambassador to Malawi from 1981 to 1984 and the United States Ambassador to Uganda from 1988 to 1991. He was a lineman for the University of Iowa football team before spending over three decades in government service.

== College career ==
John Burroughs grew up in Washington, DC, before coming to the University of Iowa. He played football for Coach Forest Evashevski from 1956 to 1958. During that time, the Hawkeyes won two Big Ten championships and two Rose Bowl games. Burroughs graduated in 1959 with a degree in political science.

== Political career ==
Burroughs began his career as a social science teacher in Washington, DC, in 1959. He served successively as passport examiner in 1960-63, Assistant Chief of Special Services Branch of the Passport Office in 1963-64, and administrative assistant in the Bureau of Economic and Business Affairs in 1964-66. He transferred to the Department of the Navy in 1966, where he traveled the world with the Secretary of the Navy and the Assistant Secretary of Defense and was awarded a Merrill Trust Fellowship to attend the Stanford University Executive Program.

Burroughs returned to the Department of State in 1977 as deputy assistant secretary for Equal Employment Opportunity. In 1980, he received the department's Superior Service Award from the under secretary of management for his efforts in increasing the number of minorities and women in the U.S. Foreign Service Officer Corps. Burroughs became United States ambassador to the Republic of Malawi in 1981 and served in that capacity for three years. He later served as United States ambassador to Uganda from 1988 to 1991. Burroughs retired from government service in 1994. He recorded an oral history and is featured in a "Moment in U.S. Diplomatic History" with the Association for Diplomatic Studies and Training.

Diplomatic posts
Preceded by Harold E. Horan	United States Ambassador to Malawi; 1981–1984	Succeeded by Weston Adams
Preceded by Robert Gordon Houdek	United States Ambassador to Uganda; 1988–1991	Succeeded by Johnnie Carson
