= Robert A. Stevenson =

American diplomat

Robert Ayer Stevenson (September 6, 1918– June 23, 2000) was an American life-long diplomat who served as a United States Ambassador to Malawi from 1974 to 1978.

== Youth, education and military service ==
Stevenson was born in Randolph, Vermont on September 6, 1918 to George Stevenson (1884-1962) and Maude Ayer (1881-1924).

In 1938, Stevenson graduated from the University of North Carolina with a B.S in Commerce. His major was foreign trade. He also graduated from National War College and received a master's degree in public service from Harvard University. Towards the end of World War II, he was an ensign in the Navy Supply Corps. He remained in the military until after the war.

During the 1940s, Stevenson married Dorothy Jean McIntyre (1918-2010). Together they had three children: Gordon, Roberta and Monica.

== Career ==
Stevenson joined the Foreign Service following World War II. From 1947 to 1950, he worked at the United States Embassy in San Jose, El Salvador. From 1950 to 1952, he worked at the United States Embassy in Guayaquil, Ecuador. From 1952 to 1957, he served as, among other things, a political officer in Dusseldorf, Germany. From 1957 to 1962, and from 1965 to 1967, he worked with the CIA and other agencies dealing with United States-Cuba relations. From 1962 to 1965, he worked in the United States Embassy in Santiago, Chile, where he reportedly worked as a political counselor. From 1967 to 1971, he worked at the United States Embassy in Bogota, Colombia. From 1971 to 1974, he worked in Washington on United States-Mexico relations. He worked with then-Secretary of State Henry Kissinger on many occasions.

In 1974, Stevenson was appointed to succeed William C. Burdett Jr. in the position of United States Ambassador to Malawi. He presented his credentials on August 15, 1974 and his mission was terminated on May 21, 1978. He was fond of the Malawian President, Hastings Kamuzu Banda. Stevenson was succeeded by Harold E. Horan. Following his departure from this position, Stevenson retired from the Foreign Service.

== Retirement and death ==
In retirement, Stevenson was a vocal advocate of the dwindling American bluebird population. Beyond this, he enjoyed fishing and playing tennis.

Stevenson died in Sterling, Virginia on June 23, 2000 at the age of 81. He had been suffering from Parkinson's disease.

He and his wife were buried at Forest Avenue Cemetery in Angola, Erie County, New York.
