= Consulate-General of the United States, Tabriz =

Former US Consulate in Iran

Coordinates: 38.059229°N 46.282328°E

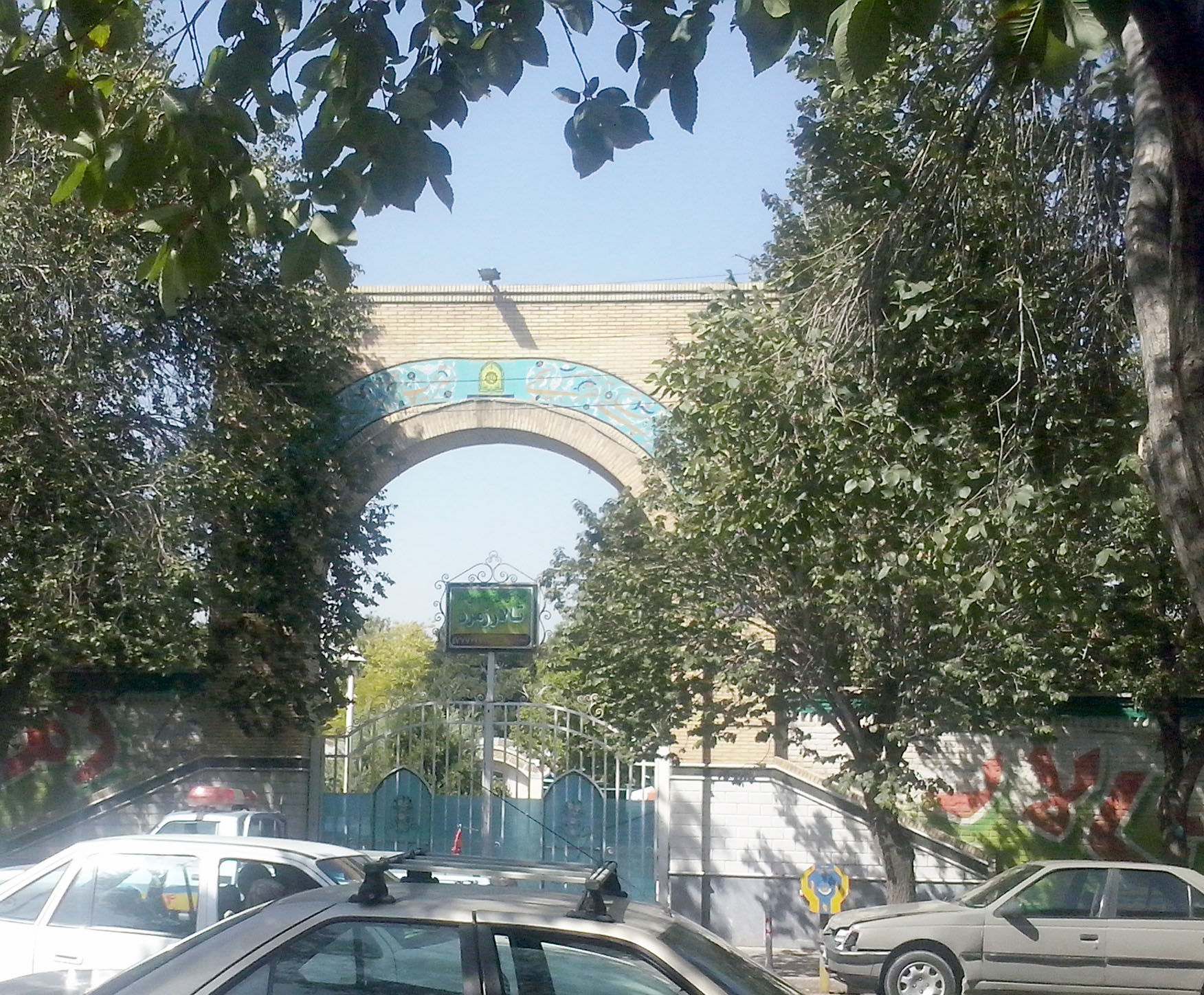
- Entrance of the former US Consulate in Tabriz
- Interactive map of Consulate-General of the United States, Tabriz
- Type: Cultural
- Location: Tabriz, East Azerbaijan province, Iran

History
- Built: 1944
- Original use: US Consulate

Site notes
- Current use: Restaurant and Reception Hall since 1999
- Governing body: Police Command of the Islamic Republic of Iran
- Owner: Federal government of the United States

The former Consulate-General of the United States, Tabriz was a diplomatic and political venue in Tabriz that operated under the auspices of the US Embassy in Tehran. This consulate was opened in 1906 and was active until the capture of the US Embassy in Tehran and the severance of Iran-US relations in 1980.

This consulate was located at the end of Lilava neighborhood or South Shariati Street. After the Iranian Revolution of 1979 and the severance of relations with the US government, its building was given to the Islamic Revolution Committees of Tabriz. After a few years, the building was given to the Iranian Police Criminal Investigation Department of Tabriz. In 1999, the area became a restaurant and reception hall affiliated with the Police Command of the Islamic Republic of Iran.

== History ==
Prior to World War II and the occupation of Tabriz by Allied leaders of World War I, the US consulate was located in an unsuitable location, and a new consulate was established in 1943 in this place. The land of the consulate was formerly an abandoned garden called the "Armenian Desert" and was owned by a person named "Haj Ali Akbar Dabbagh". When the Red Army entered Tabriz on the 26th of August 1941, this barren land became the location of Soviet army tanks. In 1944, an Austrian engineer working in "Khosravi leather factory" named "Engineer Sigmund" bought this plot of land for ten thousand tomans and turned it into a garden. The US government then bought the garden from the Austrian engineer and moved the US consulate to its place. In the critical years of the end of World War II and the formation of the Azerbaijani Democratic Party in Tabriz from 1945 to 1946, the consulate was the center of control and prevention of political-military activities of Soviet Union forces in Azerbaijan and the US Deputy Consul in Tabriz named Robert Rossow, Jr. observed the movements and activities of the Red Army in Tabriz and transmitted all the secret operations of the Soviet Union forces in Azerbaijan to the United States moment by moment. Finally, the Soviet forces evacuated Azerbaijan in June 1946, and on December 12, 1946, the government of the Azerbaijani Democratic Party was defeated and disintegrated in front of the Iranian army.

After that, the US Consulate in Tabriz continued to fulfill its duty to spread US policies in Azerbaijan and prevent the spread of anti-American ideas, and to fight communist ideology activities in the region.

Among the actions of the Americans in this consulate, can mention the display of an example of the "moonstone" that American astronauts brought to Earth from the Moon, in the big hall of the consulate, and the invitation of the people of Tabriz to watch this stone.

"Michael Metrinko", the US Consul in Tabriz from 1977 to 1979, said in an interview with the Association for Diplomatic Studies and Training about the Tabriz Consulate:

The physical setup of Tabriz was spectacular. It was one of the grand old consulates. The Tabriz consulate sat on approximately 15 acres of walled in garden. It had 1200 trees inside the wall. It had an Olympic-size swimming pool, a six-car garage, a guest house, an absolutely lovely home, and a beautiful office building surrounded by gardens and landscaping and tree-lined driveways, fountains, bird ponds, fish ponds, a volley-ball field, a field for playing football, a rose garden, grape arbors - the whole bit. It had been laid out by an American architect when America was flush with money, in the 1960s, laid out and set up principally, I think, at CIA pressure, because it was built to serve as a border-watching post. It was right on the Soviet border. It was only 45 minutes by car away from the USSR border. I was also fairly close to the Turkish border, about an hour and a half to two hours, and not that distant from the Iraqi border. It was a very strategic location.

=== List of US consuls in Tabriz ===
The table below lists the names of the US Consuls in Tabriz and their years of responsibility.

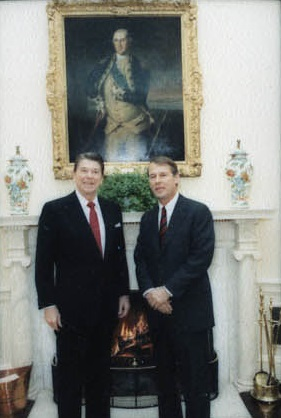
Walter L. Cutler (right), US Consul in Tabriz in 1965–1967 with Ronald Reagan.

Name	Years
William F. Doty	1906–1910
Gordon Paddock	1910–1919
Augustin W. Ferrin	1926–1928
William C. Burdett	1950–1952
Ernest Thomas Greene	?
Robert L. Funseth	1954–1956
Harold G. Josif	1957–1959
William L. Eagleton	1959–1961
Archie M. Bolster	1961–1963
Carleton S. Coon Jr.	1963–1965
Walter L. Cutler	1965–1967
Charles A. Mast	1972–1974
David C. McGaffey	1976–1979
Michael Metrinko	1978–1981

== After Iranian Revolution of 1979 ==
During the riot of the people of Tabriz against Mohammad Reza Pahlavi on February 18, 1978, the "John F. Kennedy Library in Tabriz", the "Iran-US Cultural Center in Tabriz" and the "Point Four Program office" were attacked by revolutionaries and with the exception of the US consulate, which had diplomatic immunity, all other American institutions in Tabriz were destroyed. During February 1979, the revolutionaries of Tabriz, led by Mohammad Ali Qazi Tabatabaei, moved towards this consulate and lowered the large sign of the consulate and the American flag from its door. Then, at the same time as the US embassy in Tehran was captured, the US consulate in Tabriz was also occupied by the revolutionary invaders.

At present, the location of this consulate on "Shariati Street" in Tabriz has been turned into an "Reception Hall and Restaurant" owned by the Police Command of the Islamic Republic of Iran.

== Gallery ==
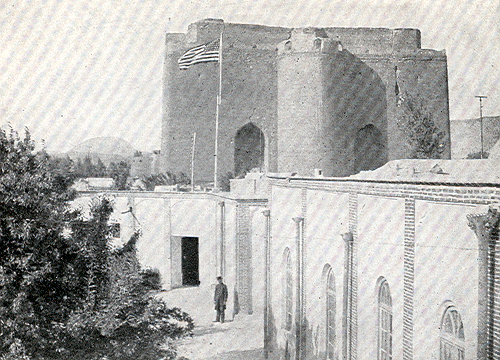
The Flag of the United States is waving in the previous building of the American Consulate, on the south side of Arg of Tabriz in 1911. Picture by William Morgan Shuster.

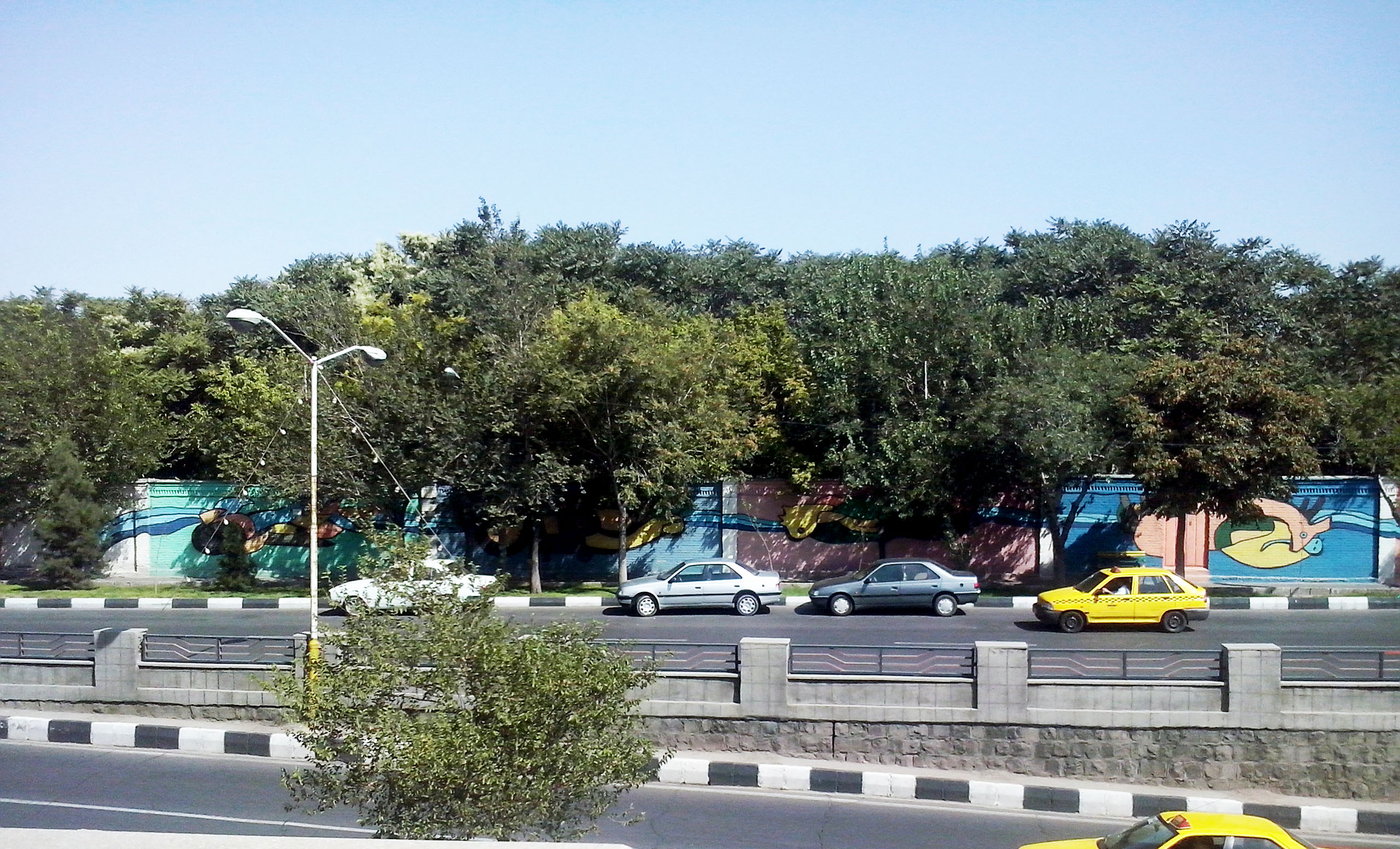
Garden and yard of the former US Consulate in Tabriz.

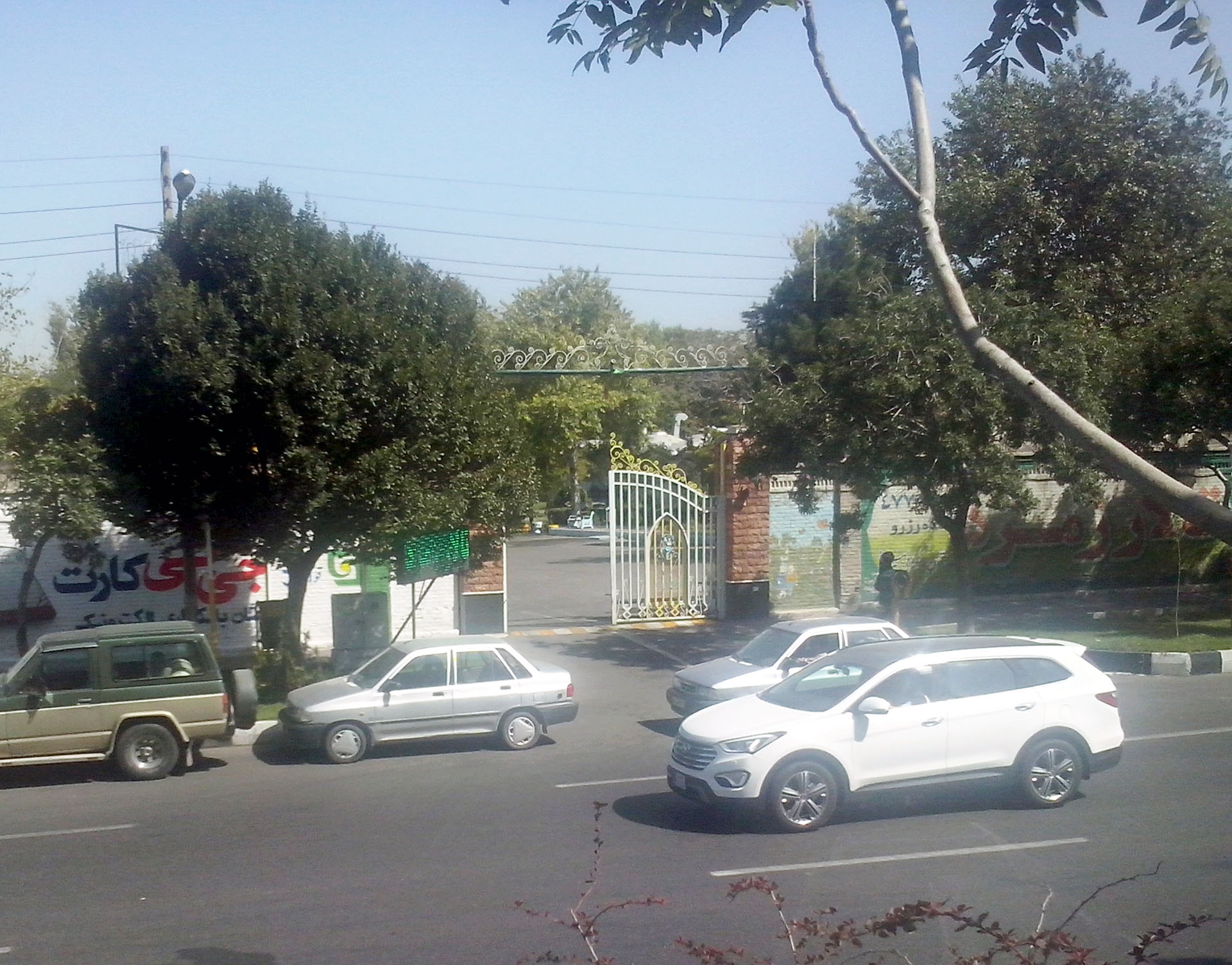
Entrance of the former US Consulate in Tabriz.

== See also ==
- Iran–United States relations
- Embassy of the United States, Tehran
- Embassy of Iran, Washington, D.C.
- Interests Section of the Islamic Republic of Iran in the United States
- United States Cultural Diplomacy in Iran
