= Hanscom Smith =

American diplomat

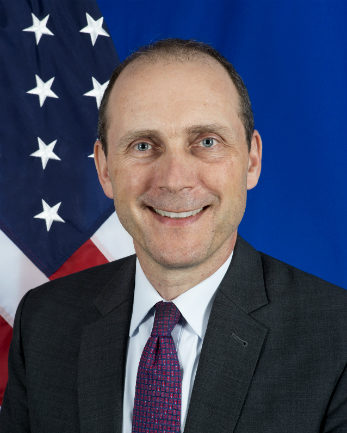

United States Consul General to Hong Kong and Macau
- In office 6 July 2019 – 12 July 2022
- President: Donald Trump; Joe Biden
- Preceded by: Kurt Tong
- Succeeded by: Gregory May

Personal details
- Born: Michael Hanscom Smith; Maine
- Spouse: Lu Ying-tsung
- Education: Georgetown University; London School of Economics; Princeton University

Chinese name
- Traditional Chinese: 史墨客
- Simplified Chinese: 史墨客
Transcriptions
Standard Mandarin
- Hanyu Pinyin: Shǐ Mòkè
- Wade–Giles: Shih^{3} Mo^{4}-kê^{4}

Michael Hanscom Smith is a career member of the US Senior Foreign Service who had served as Consul General in Hong Kong and Macau from July 2019 to July 2022. Smith has also served as Consul General in Shanghai (2014–2017), Director/Acting Deputy Assistant Secretary of the Office of Chinese and Mongolian Affairs at the Department of State. He also served as Economic Section Chief at the Taipei Main Office of the American Institute in Taiwan (AIT), and team leader at the United States Provincial Reconstruction Team in the Iraqi Province of Muthanna.

== Education ==
Smith earned a bachelor’s degree from Georgetown University, master’s degrees from the London School of Economics and Princeton University, a certificate in political studies from Sciences Po in Paris and was a Council on Foreign Relations International Affairs Fellow in Japan.

== Academic career ==
Smith is a senior fellow at the Jackson School of Global Affairs at Yale. When speaking about the Global Financial Leaders' Investment Summit, Smith warned companies that "It's not business as usual in Hong Kong, and those companies who do business are going to have to grapple with that uncertainty for the foreseeable future."

== Personal life ==
While Consul in Shanghai, he and his same-sex partner Lu Ying-tsung also known as Eric Lu, who is from Taiwan, married in San Francisco. As gay marriage is illegal in China, his marriage, as well as the marriage of British Consul General Brian Davidson to his husband, has caused a “stir.” On 5 January 2022 he announced on social media the birth of their son Julian Lu Smith. In addition to English, Smith speaks Mandarin Chinese, French, Danish, and Khmer.

Diplomatic posts
Preceded by Kurt Tong	United States Consul General to Hong Kong and Macau; July 2019 – July 2022	Succeeded by Gregory May
