= List of ambassadors of the United States to Malawi =

Ambassador of the United States to Malawi
- Seal of the United States Department of State

- Flag of a United States ambassador

- Incumbent; Melania R. Arreaga; Chargé d'affaires ad interim since July 17, 2026
- Nominator: The president of the United States
- Appointer: The president; with Senate advice and consent
- Inaugural holder: Edward W. Holmes as Chargé d'affaires ad interim
- Formation: July 6, 1964
- Website: U.S. Embassy - Lilongwe

The Federation of Rhodesia and Nyasaland was dissolved on December 31, 1963, and Malawi became a fully independent member of the Commonwealth of Nations on July 6, 1964.

The United States immediately recognized the new nation and moved to establish diplomatic relations. The U.S. embassy in Blantyre (later Zomba) was established July 6, 1964—independence day for Malawi.

== Ambassadors ==
Name	Title	Appointed	Presented credentials	Terminated mission	Notes
Sam P. Gilstrap – Career FSO	Ambassador Extraordinary and Plenipotentiary	July 1, 1964	July 8, 1964	October 6, 1965	
Marshall P. Jones – Career FSO	Ambassador Extraordinary and Plenipotentiary	November 10, 1965	January 13, 1966	March 20, 1970	Jones was reaccredited after Malawi became a republic and presented new credentials July 8, 1966.
William C. Burdett Jr. – Career FSO	Ambassador Extraordinary and Plenipotentiary	April 8, 1970	May 13, 1970	May 11, 1974	
Robert A. Stevenson – Career FSO	Ambassador Extraordinary and Plenipotentiary	June 20, 1974	August 15, 1974	May 21, 1978	The Embassy was moved to Lilongwe April 1, 1976, during Stevenson’s tenure.
Harold E. Horan – Career FSO	Ambassador Extraordinary and Plenipotentiary	August 11, 1978	January 24, 1979	July 17, 1980	The post was vacant July 1980–August 1981. Robert M. Maxim served as chargé d'affaires during that interval.
John A. Burroughs, Jr. – Political appointee	Ambassador Extraordinary and Plenipotentiary	May 7, 1981	August 17, 1981	June 9, 1984	
Weston Adams – Political Appointee	Ambassador Extraordinary and Plenipotentiary	June 11, 1984	August 17, 1984	August 8, 1986	The post was vacant August 1986–May 1988. Dennis C. Jett served as chargé d'affaires ad interim during that period.
George Arthur Trail III – Career FSO	Ambassador Extraordinary and Plenipotentiary	April 28, 1988	May 13, 1988	May 2, 1991	
Michael T. F. Pistor – Career FSO	Ambassador Extraordinary and Plenipotentiary	July 1, 1991	July 25, 1991	June 20, 1994	
Peter R. Chaveas – Career FSO	Ambassador Extraordinary and Plenipotentiary	May 9, 1994	September 12, 1994	June 27, 1997	
Amelia Ellen Shippy – Career FSO	Ambassador Extraordinary and Plenipotentiary	November 7, 1997	February 2, 1998	August 5, 2000	
Roger A. Meece – Career FSO	Ambassador Extraordinary and Plenipotentiary	September 15, 2000	November 7, 2000	July 20, 2003	
Steven A. Browning – Career FSO	Ambassador Extraordinary and Plenipotentiary	May 27, 2003	September 19, 2003	May 16, 2004	
Alan W. Eastham – Career FSO	Ambassador Extraordinary and Plenipotentiary	August 2, 2005	August 25, 2005	July 15, 2008	
Peter Bodde – Career FSO	Ambassador Extraordinary and Plenipotentiary	June 6, 2008	October 28, 2008	August 1, 2010	Edward W. Holmes served as chargé d'affaires ad interim from August 2010 to July 2011
Jeanine E. Jackson, Career FSO	Ambassador Extraordinary and Plenipotentiary	July 5, 2011	October 20, 2011	September 25, 2014	
Virginia E. Palmer, Career FSO	Ambassador Extraordinary and Plenipotentiary	December 18, 2014	February 27, 2015	June 7, 2019	
Robert K. Scott, Career FSO	Ambassador Extraordinary and Plenipotentiary	April 16, 2019	August 6, 2019	October 20, 2021	
David Young, Career FSO	Ambassador Extraordinary and Plenipotentiary	March 2, 2022	May 5, 2022	February 12, 2024	
Amy W. Diaz, Career FSO	Chargé d'Affaires ad interim	February 12, 2024		July 11, 2025	
Philip R. Nelson, Career FSO	Chargé d'Affaires ad interim	July 11, 2025		August 8, 2025	
Melania Arreaga, Career FSO	Chargé d'Affaires ad interim	August 8, 2025		August 30, 2025	
Jonathan Fischer, Career FSO	Chargé d'Affaires ad interim	September 1, 2025		July 17, 2026	
Melania R. Arreaga, Career FSO	Chargé d'Affaires ad interim	July 17, 2026		Present	

== See also ==
- Malawi – United States relations
- Foreign relations of Malawi
- Ambassadors of the United States
