= Robert K. Scott (diplomat) =

American diplomat (born 1963)

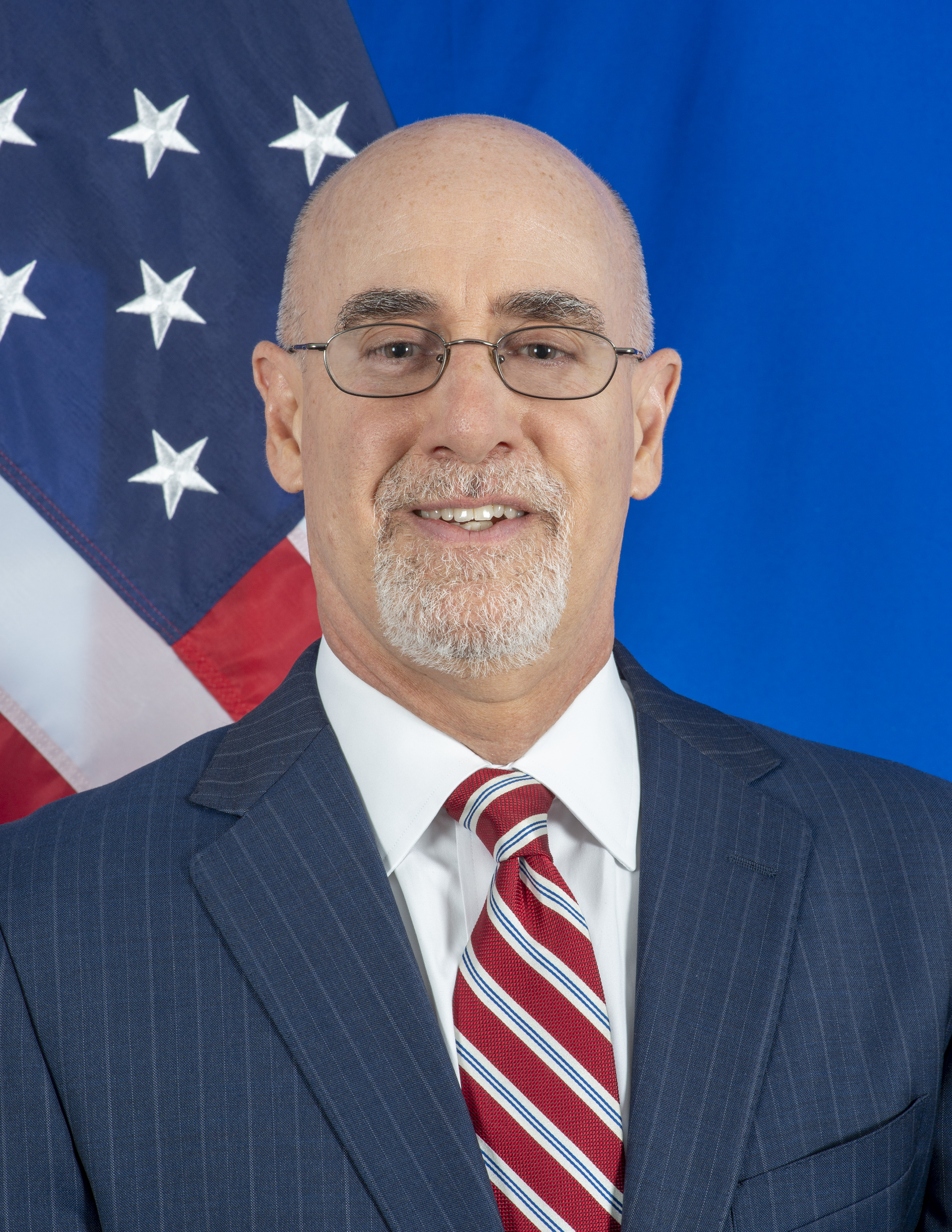
- Scott in 2019

United States Ambassador to Malawi
- In office August 6, 2019 – October 20, 2021
- President: Donald Trump; Joe Biden
- Preceded by: Virginia E. Palmer
- Succeeded by: David Young

Personal details
- Born: June 5, 1963 (age 63)
- Education: Lawrence University (BA); American University (MA)

Robert K. Scott (born June 5, 1963) is an American diplomat who served as the United States Ambassador to Malawi from 2019 to 2021.

== Early life and education ==
Scott earned a Bachelor of Arts from Lawrence University and a Master of Arts from American University. He also studied at the University of Göttingen in Germany on a United States Fulbright Grant.

== Career ==
Scott has been a career member of the Senior Foreign Service, class of Counselor, since 1994. He previously served as Deputy Chief of Mission at the United States Embassies in Harare, Zimbabwe and Dar es Salaam, Tanzania and in multiple senior leadership positions at the United States Department of State.

On August 13, 2018, President Donald Trump announced his intent to nominate Scott to be the next United States Ambassador to Malawi. On August 16, 2018, his nomination was sent the United States Senate. On April 11, 2019, his nomination was confirmed in the United States by voice vote. He presented his credentials to President Peter Mutharika on August 6, 2019. His mission ended when he left the country on October 20, 2021.

== Personal life ==
He speaks German, Ukrainian, and French. He is married to his wife Anne and has two children, twins Jennifer and Nicolas.

Diplomatic posts
Preceded by Virginia E. Palmer	United States Ambassador to Malawi; 2019–2021	Succeeded by David Young
