= William C. Burdett Jr. =

William Carter Burdett Jr. (October 25, 1918 – March 11, 1995) was an American diplomat who served as a United States Ambassador to Malawi from 1970 to 1974.

== Youth, early career and military service ==
Burdett was born on October 25, 1918 in Knoxville, Tennessee to William Carter Burdett (1884–1944) and Elizabeth Burke Burdett (1895–1977). His father served in World War I, and after he was in the Foreign Service and served as an Ambassador to New Zealand from 1943 until his death in 1944. His brother served in the United States Air Force during the Vietnam War and would be killed in 1967.

== Career ==
Between 1946 and 1952, Burdett served as Vice Consul in the United States Embassies of Iraq, Israel and Iran. During the 1950s and 1960s, Burdett served in various capacities in the Middle East and Africa. In addition, he reportedly served in the United States Embassies in the United Kingdom and Turkey.

Upon the retirement of Marshal P. Jones in 1970, Burdett was appointed to be the United States Ambassador to Malawi. Burdett served in this position from May 13, 1970 until his retirement on May 11, 1974. He was succeeded by Robert A. Stevenson.

== Death ==
Burdett died on March 11, 1995, at the Addison Gilbert Hospital in Gloucester, Massachusetts, aged 76 years. He was buried at Rose Hill Cemetery in Macon, Bibb County, Georgia.
