= Roger Tredwell =

American diplomat

Roger Culver Tredwell (July 1885 – July 12, 1961) was an American diplomat. He received international attention when he was imprisoned in Russian Central Asia by Bolshevik forces shortly after the Russian Revolution.

== Diplomatic career ==
Tredwell had a variety of positions all over the world. In 1914 he was stationed in Bristol, England. In 1915 he served in Italy at Turin and then Rome. By 1917 he was serving in Russia, at which time he went to Turkestan on a fact-finding mission and was imprisoned. In 1922 he began a three-year tour as United States Consul General at large for Central Asia and Africa. From 1926 to 1929 he served in Hong Kong, marrying Metta-Louise Orr from New York in 1929. He was then relocated to Stockholm in the early 1930s.

== Imprisonment in Tashkent ==
Cotton bales near Tashkent.

In 1918 Tredwell was sent to Tashkent in Russian Central Asia to investigate the political and cotton situation there. At this time, World War I was still raging across Europe. Munitions of the day used cotton (see nitrocellulose), however a successful blockade by the British had limited Germany's cotton supply. The Entente powers were concerned that the Germans might try to procure local supplies throughout the former Russian Empire, especially in the Turkestan region, as well as rally political and military support in the area to launch an attack against British India.

Tredwell prepared two reports during that summer after traveling extensively around the region and speaking to many people about the current political and economic situation.

Tredwell was arrested by the Bolsheviks in on October 15, 1918. He was soon able to secure his release, and quickly set about to free other foreigners arrested that same day. Shortly after, however, he was placed once again under house arrest. At one point he was taken to a prison where it seemed he was about to be executed, but the local police chief stopped the process at the last minute. In March 1919, the British offered to release Bolshevik prisoners they were holding in Persia in exchange for Tredwell's freedom. This exchange, however, never took place. He was taken from Tashkent to Moscow, then onward to Finland, where he was released in May 1919. Upon his return, he denounced Bolshevik rule and predicted that the Russian people would soon rise up against it. During his time in Tashkent, Tredwell was acquainted with and assisted the British intelligence officer Frederick Marshman Bailey. Tredwell features in Bailey's account of his exploits there in the book Mission to Tashkent.
