= Julie Eadeh =

American diplomat

Julie A. Eadeh
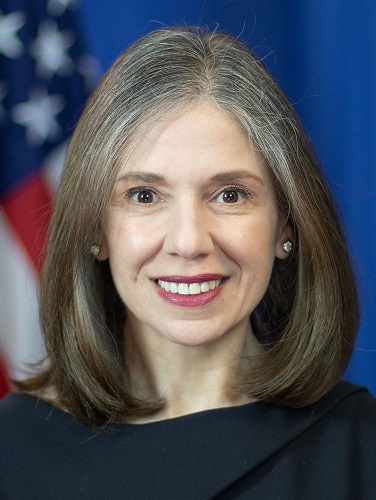
- Official portrait, 2025

United States Consul General to Hong Kong and Macau
- Incumbent
- Assumed office August 27, 2025
- President: Donald Trump
- Preceded by: Gregory May

Personal details
- Born: Julie Ann Eadeh Ohio, U.S.
- Education: Eastern Michigan University (BS); Georgetown University (MA)

Julie Ann Eadeh is a career member of the Senior Foreign Service with the rank of Minister Counselor. She is the current consul general in Hong Kong. She previously served as the U.S. consul general in Istanbul, Türkiye, and has held a variety of assignments throughout her career. She has had postings in Ankara, Hong Kong, Doha, Shanghai, Baghdad, Riyadh, and Beirut. She served as the former political chief of the US consulate in Hong Kong.

== Early life ==
Eadeh was born in Ohio and raised in Michigan. Eadeh has a Bachelor of Science degree from Eastern Michigan University and a Master of Arts degree from the Center for Contemporary Arab Studies at Georgetown University.

== Career ==
Eadeh joined the Department of State in 2002 as a Presidential Management Fellow, which she served in the Bureau of Democracy, Human Rights, and Labor. Eadeh later joined the Foreign Service in 2004, which she covered human rights and the first ever Saudi elections as a political officer at the U.S. Embassy in Riyadh, Saudi Arabia. From 2006-2007, Eadeh served as the chief of American Citizen Services at the U.S. Embassy in Beirut, Lebanon. During the 2006 Lebanon War, she assisted in the largest civilian evacuation of American citizens since World War II. From 2007-2008, Eadeh worked as the deputy spokesperson, covering press and media relations, at the U.S. Embassy in Baghdad, Iraq.

Eadeh later served at the U.S. Consulate General in Shanghai, China, from 2010 to 2012, covering environment, science, technology, health and energy issues. She then served as the public affairs officer and acting deputy chief of mission at the U.S. Embassy in Doha, Qatar.

During Eadeh's tenure as the political chief of the US consulate in Hong Kong in 2019, she was photographed meeting with democracy activists Joshua Wong and Nathan Law, both being prominent figures in the 2014 Umbrella Movement protests. She was also photographed meeting Martin Lee and Anson Chan, both being long opposition figures of the Hong Kong government. For these encounters, Eadeh was criticised by the Chinese government and state-owned media for having "orchestrated" the 2019 Hong Kong protests. Her personal information along her husband's and their children's were also released by state-owned media outlet Ta Kung Pao.

From August 2021 to October 2022, she served as the Mission Türkiye Spokesperson in Ankara. She later assumed duty as the U.S. consul general in November 2022.

In August 2025, Eadeh was appointed as the consul general in Hong Kong, with her appointment approved by the Chinese government, a month following Gregory May, the previous consul general's departure.

== Personal life ==
Eadeh is married to a Foreign Service Officer and has two sons. She is proficient in Turkish, Arabic, and Mandarin Chinese. Eadeh completed Chinese language training in Taiwan and Shanghai in 2010.

Eadeh was awarded an honorary doctorate by Eastern Michigan University in April 2025 in recognition of her contributions to diplomacy and public services.
