= Harold E. Horan =

American diplomat

Harold Eugene Horan (June 16, 1927 – March 12, 2008) was an American diplomat who served as a United States Ambassador to Malawi from 1979 to 1980.

== Youth, education and military service ==
Horan was born on June 16, 1927 in Houston, Texas. He served in the United States Army Air Force in 1945 and 1946. He earned a B.B.A and an L.L.D from the University of Houston.

== Career ==
Horan joined the Foreign Service in 1957. From 1957 to 1967, he worked in the United States Department of State as well as in Tehran, Iran and Florence, Italy. From 1967 to 1969, he worked at the United States Embassy in Bamako, Mali. From 1969 to 1972, he worked in Washington, dealing with United States-Liberia relations and United States-Guinea relations. From 1973 to 1976, he worked with the National Security Council regarding western Africa, where he worked with then-Secretary of State Henry Kissinger. From 1976 to 1979, he worked at the United States Embassy in Monrovia, Liberia.

In 1979, Horan was appointed by President Jimmy Carter to succeed Robert A. Stevenson in the position of United States Ambassador to Malawi. He presented his credentials on January 24, 1979 and his mission was terminated on July 17, 1980. He was succeeded by Robert M. Maxim as a Chargé d'Affaires ad interim diplomat.

== Death ==
Horan died on March 12, 2008 at the age of 80.
