= Gregory C. May =

American diplomat and former journalist

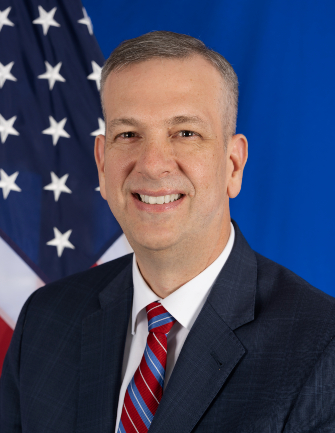
- Official portrait, 2022

Deputy Chief of Mission at the U.S. Embassy in Beijing
- Incumbent
- Assumed office July 2025
- President: Donald Trump
- Preceded by: Sarah M. Beran

United States Consul General to Hong Kong and Macau
- In office September 16, 2022 – July 11, 2025
- President: Joe Biden; Donald Trump
- Preceded by: Hanscom Smith
- Succeeded by: Julie Eadeh

Personal details
- Spouse: Margaret Li-hung Ma
- Education: University of Texas at Austin; Johns Hopkins University SAIS
- Occupation: Diplomat
- Website: https://china.usembassy-china.org.cn/deputy-chief-of-mission-gregory-c-may/

Chinese name
- Chinese: 梅儒瑞
Transcriptions
Standard Mandarin
- Hanyu Pinyin: Méi Rúruì
Yue: Cantonese
- Jyutping: mui4 jyu4 seoi6

Gregory C. May (Chinese: 梅儒瑞; pinyin: Méi Rúruì) is an American diplomat and former journalist who has served as deputy chief of mission at the U.S. Embassy in Beijing since July 2025. He previously served as U.S. consul general in Hong Kong and Macau from 2022 to 2025, deputy chief of mission at the U.S. Embassy in Ulaanbaatar from 2019 to 2022, and U.S. consul general in Shenyang from 2016 to 2019.

== Early life and career ==
May is from Texas. He graduated from the University of Texas at Austin and received a master's degree in China Studies from the Paul H. Nitze School of Advanced International Studies at Johns Hopkins University.

Before joining the United States Foreign Service, May worked from 1993 to 1996 as a journalist for International Community Radio Taipei, an English-language radio station in Taiwan. He also worked as a correspondent for Newsweek and as assistant director and research associate in Chinese Studies at the Nixon Center, a foreign-policy think tank in Washington, D.C.

May joined the Foreign Service in 2000. In Washington, he served as a special assistant to the Under Secretary of State for Political Affairs, a senior watch officer in the State Department's Operations Center, and an officer working on China and Vietnam. His overseas assignments included postings at the U.S. Consulate General in Guangzhou, the U.S. Embassy in Beijing, and the U.S. Embassy in Rome.

In August 2016, May became U.S. consul general in Shenyang, serving until 2019. He subsequently served as deputy chief of mission at the U.S. Embassy in Ulaanbaatar from August 2019 until 2022.

== Consul General in Hong Kong and Macau ==
May arrived in Hong Kong on September 16, 2022, to succeed Hanscom Smith as U.S. consul general in Hong Kong and Macau. The post had been vacant for approximately two months following Smith's departure in July.

May's tenure took place amid strained relations between the United States, China and the Hong Kong government, particularly over the Hong Kong national security law, U.S. sanctions, and the enactment of domestic national-security legislation under Article 23 of the Basic Law. May repeatedly expressed concern about the effect of the national-security laws on political freedoms, civil society and Hong Kong's international business environment.

His comments prompted repeated criticism from the Hong Kong government, which accused him of making biased or unfounded statements about the city's national-security regime and of interfering in Hong Kong's affairs.

In June 2025, shortly before leaving the post, May again criticised the application of Hong Kong's national-security laws, including the prosecution of political activists and the issuing of arrest warrants and bounties for activists living overseas. The Hong Kong government rejected his remarks and accused the United States of applying double standards on national security.

May concluded his tenure in July 2025. On July 11, he published a farewell message to Hong Kong in which he praised the city's people and said he hoped to visit again in the future.

== Deputy Chief of Mission in Beijing ==
In July 2025, May became deputy chief of mission at the U.S. Embassy in Beijing, succeeding Sarah M. Beran. The South China Morning Post reported that May's experience in mainland China, Hong Kong and Taiwan and his work maintaining business and academic exchanges during a period of strained U.S.-China relations were among the factors behind his selection for the position.

May was succeeded in Hong Kong by Julie Eadeh, who assumed office in August 2025 after receiving approval from the Chinese government.

== Personal life ==
May speaks Mandarin and studied Cantonese while serving as consul general in Hong Kong and Macau.

May is married to Margaret Li-hung Ma and has three children.

Diplomatic posts
Preceded by Sarah M. Beran	Deputy Chief of Mission at the U.S. Embassy in Beijing; 2025-present	Incumbent
Preceded by Hanscom Smith	United States Consul General to Hong Kong and Macau; 2022-2025	Succeeded by Julie Eadeh
Preceded by Scott Weinhold	United States Consul General in Shenyang; 2016-2019	Succeeded by Nancy Abella
