= Clifford Hart =

American diplomat (born 1961)

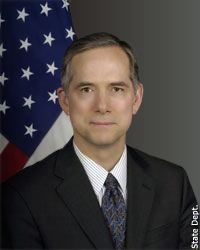

United States Consul General to Hong Kong and Macau
- In office July 30, 2013 – July 30, 2016
- President: Barack Obama
- Preceded by: Stephen Young
- Succeeded by: Kurt Tong

United States Special Envoy for the Six-Party Talks
- In office October 31, 2011 – July 23, 2013
- President: Barack Obama
- Preceded by: Sung Kim
- Succeeded by: Sydney Seiler

Personal details
- Born: 1961 (age 64–65)
- Education: University of Mary Washington; University of Virginia

Chinese name
- Traditional Chinese: 夏千福
- Simplified Chinese: 夏千福
Transcriptions
Standard Mandarin
- Hanyu Pinyin: Xià Qiānfú
- Wade–Giles: Hsia^{4} Ch'ien^{1}-fu^{2}

Clifford A. Hart Jr. is an American diplomat. He served as Consul General of the United States of America to Hong Kong and Macau from July 2013 to July 2016. His was also a Special Envoy for the Six-Party Talks, for which President Obama accorded him the personal rank of Ambassador.

== Education ==
Hart holds a BA from the University of Mary Washington and an MA from the University of Virginia, where he was a President's Fellow.

== Career ==
Over his 30-year diplomatic career, Hart's overseas experience includes three assignments to China and one each in the Soviet Union and Iraq. He also has pursued Chinese language training in Taiwan. He can understand Cantonese. As Consul General to Hong Kong and Macau, he made good use of social media and is well-liked locally; he is affectionately nicknamed "Clifford BB".

Hart's other Washington assignments include, at the White House, the National Security Council's China/Taiwan Director; at the Pentagon, Foreign Policy Advisor to the Chief of Naval Operations; and, at the State Department, Director of the Office of Taiwan Coordination, Deputy Coordinator for Reconstruction and Stabilization, Operations Center Deputy Director for Crisis Management, and other positions.

Hart is a recipient of the State Department's highest commendation for diplomatic reporting and the U.S. Navy's Distinguished Public Servant Award. He also has received State Department Superior and Meritorious Honor Awards and the U.S. Army's Meritorious Civilian Service Award.

On June 10, 2016, the Department of State announced that Hart would be succeeded by Kurt Tong, Principal Deputy Assistant Secretary of State, starting in August 2016. During a Facebook Live chat session in July 2016, Hart said that he will retire from his 33-year diplomatic career and return to Hong Kong to work for a private institution.

Hart currently is a senior advisor at BowerGroup Asia.

Diplomatic posts
Preceded by Sung Kim	United States Special Envoy for the Six-Party Talks; 2011–2013	Succeeded by Sydney Seiler
Preceded by Stephen Young	United States Consul General to Hong Kong and Macau; 2013–2016	Succeeded by Kurt Tong
