= Qabaniso Malewezi =

Malawian musician and poet

- Born: 1979 (age 46–47); Lilongwe, Malawi
- Education: Liverpool Institute for Performing Arts; Academy of Contemporary Music
- Relatives: Justin Malewezi (father)
- Writing career
- Pen name: Q Malewezi
- Language: English
- Genre: Poetry
- Website: qmalewezi.com

Qabaniso Malewezi, also known as Q, (born 1979) is a Malawian musician and poet. A former producer for the hip-hop band Real Elements, he has since authored several collections of poems including the audio collection People. In 2015 he received an honorary doctorate from Mzuzu University.

== Biography ==
The son of Justin Malewezi, a former vice-president of Malawi, Malewezi grew up in Lilongwe. He developed a love for music at a young age, learned to play the guitar, and spent his teenage years performing and recording music. As an adult, he moved to the United Kingdom, where he studied performing arts at the Liverpool Institute for Performing Arts and the Academy of Contemporary Music in Guildford, Surrey.

While in the United Kingdom, Malewezi became the producer for the group Real Elements, which performed hip-hop and became popular in Malawi and several other countries. They were active from the late 1990s to the first part of the 2000s.

In 2004, Malewezi returned to Malawi to be with his father, who campaigned unsuccessfully for the presidency of Malawi that year. Malewezi returned again to Malawi in 2005.

== Poetry ==
Malewezi's first poetry collection, The Road Taken, was published in 2011. The book was edited by Pascal Kishindo, and included photos by the author, Justin Malewezi Jr., and graphic designer Fred Coelho. Poems from the book have been included in several writing courses. In 2013, Malewezi published his second poetry collection, Little Discoveries, written in English, and in 2016 he published the audio poetry collection People. Phindu Zaie Banda was at its launch, Malewezi performed his poem "Wikipedia".

Malewezi has been featured on CNN's African Voices, BBC World, and The Travel Channel.

In 2015, he received an honorary doctorate from Mzuzu University in recognition of his contribution to the arts.

In 2021 he launched a series of poetry events titled, Stripped. He was supported by the poet Phindu Zaie Banda, who said it would be a "fresh and interesting" set of events.

== Bibliography ==
- Malewezi, Q.; Kishindo, P. (2011). The Road Taken: Poetry. Mbidzi Pub.
- Malewezi, Q (2013). Little discoveries : short poems. Lilongwe, Malawi: Q. Malewezi Poetry. ISBN 978-99960-955-4-2. OCLC 957264597.
