= Sam P. Gilstrap =

American diplomat (1907–1989)

Samuel P. Gilstrap
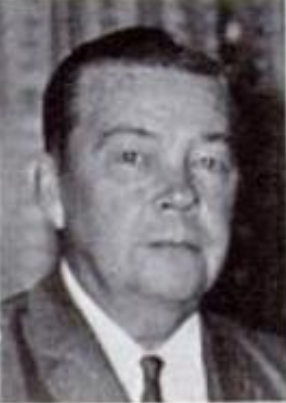

United States Ambassador to Malawi
- In office July 8, 1964 – October 6, 1965
- Preceded by: None
- Succeeded by: Marshall P. Jones

Personal details
- Born: Samuel Patrick Gilstrap; May 1, 1907 Chandler, Oklahoma, U.S.
- Died: April 25, 1989 (aged 81) Cocoa Beach, Florida, U.S.
- Spouse: Mary Ethel
- Children: 2
- Education: Oklahoma State University; Cumberland University Law School (LLB)
- Occupation: Lawyer; diplomat

Samuel Patrick Gilstrap (May 1, 1907 – April 25, 1989) was an American diplomat. He served in the United States Foreign Service from 1947 to 1965. He served as the first U.S. Ambassador to Malawi following Malawi's independence.

== Early life ==
Samuel Patrick Gilstrap was born on May 1, 1907, in Chandler, Oklahoma. He graduated from Oklahoma State University in 1930 and graduated from Cumberland University Law School with a Bachelor of Laws in 1931. He was admitted to the bar in Oklahoma in 1932.

== Career ==
Gilstrap practiced law in Oklahoma City for four years. He was chief auditor for the Civilian Works Administration in Oklahoma City from 1934 to 1935. He then worked as assistant director for accounts for the Works Progress Administration in Washington, D.C. From 1939 to 1942, he was administrator of the Office of Price Administration in Puerto Rico and the U.S. Virgin Islands. During World War II, from 1942 to 1944, he was executive officer of the United States Office of War Information in San Francisco. He then was director of the Office of Price Administration in Puerto Rico for three years.

In 1947, Gilstrap joined the United States Foreign Service. He was an attache in Cairo for three years. He was deputy executive secretary to the U.S. High Commissioner in Frankfurt, West Germany in 1950. He was attache to the Philippines in 1951 and attache to Mexico City in 1953. He was counselor of embassy in Tehran from 1955 to 1956. In 1958, he was counselor of embassy to Seoul. He was deputy principal officer of the American Consulate General in Hong Kong from 1960 to 1961. He then served as counsel general and minister in Singapore. In 1961, he was the Consul in Hong Kong and Macau. He served as Ambassador Extraordinary and Plenipotentiary to Malawi from July 1964 until October 6, 1965. He was the first United States Ambassador to Malawi after independence. In 1965, he returned to Washington, D.C., as deputy assistant secretary of the Bureau of International Organization Affairs. He retired in May 1966. In June 1966, he became deputy chancellor of the East-West Center in Honolulu, a school attached to the University of Hawai'i. He was in that role for five years. He served as acting head while Howard P. Jones was in Europe.

== Personal life ==
Gilstrap married Mary Ethel of Bethesda, Maryland. They had two sons, Samuel Patrick and Ronald Edmond. He moved to Coach Beach in 1985.

Gilstrap died of a heart attack on April 25, 1989. He was buried in Washington, D.C.
