= Beijing Institute of Education =

University in Beijing, China

Coordinates: 39.96°N 116.39°E

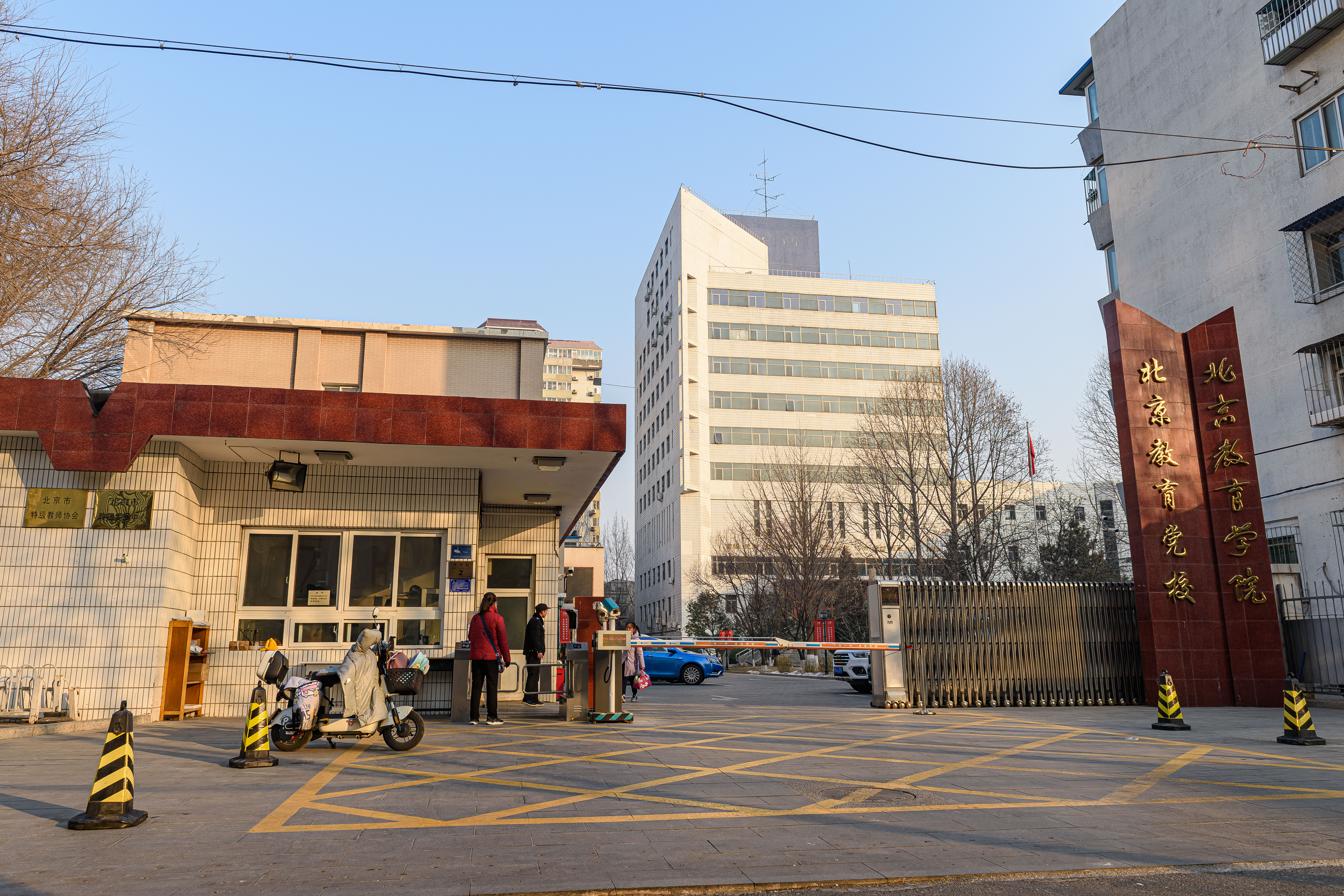
- Simplified Chinese: 北京教育学院
- Traditional Chinese: 北京教育學院
Transcriptions
Standard Mandarin
- Hanyu Pinyin: Běijīng Jiàoyù Xuéyuàn

Beijing Institute of Education (Chinese: 北京教育学院), founded in 1953 , is a university institution specialized in adult education in Xicheng District, Beijing, China under the provincial government.
