= David Young (diplomat) =

American diplomat

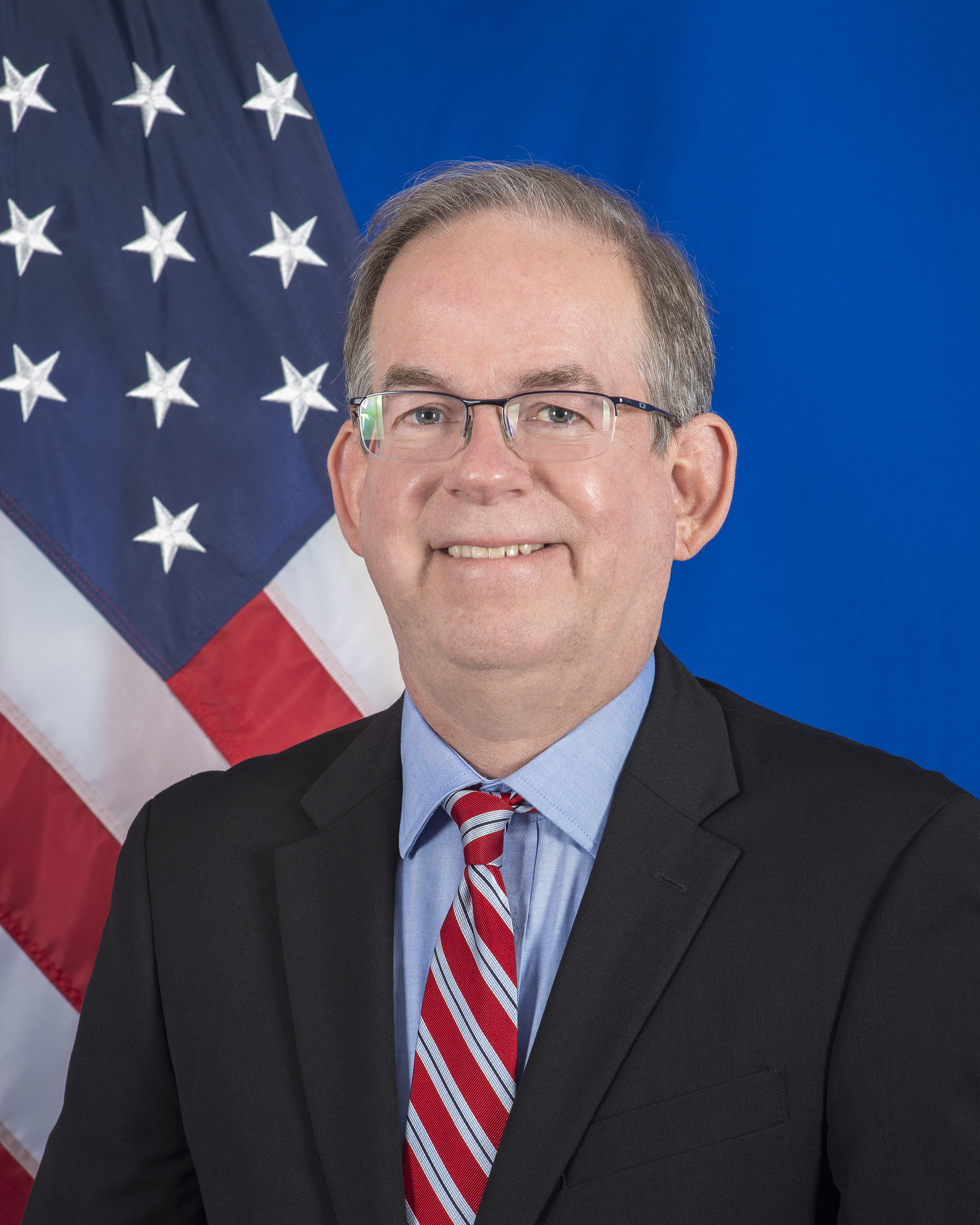
- Official portrait, 2022

United States Ambassador to Malawi
- In office May 5, 2022 – February 12, 2024
- President: Joe Biden
- Preceded by: Robert K. Scott
- Succeeded by: John McIntyre

Chargé d’Affaires, ad interim of Zambia
- In office January 2, 2020 – November 2, 2021
- President: Donald Trump; Joe Biden
- Preceded by: Daniel Lewis Foote
- Succeeded by: Martin A. Dale (Chargé d’Affaires)

Personal details
- Born: Kansas City, Missouri, U.S.
- Spouse: Diane Weisz Young
- Children: 2
- Education: University of Missouri (BA); Trinity College Dublin; Boston University (MIA, MDiv)

David John Young is an American diplomat who was the United States Ambassador to Malawi.

== Education ==
Young earned his Bachelor of Arts in journalism from the University of Missouri; a Diploma from Trinity College Dublin; and a Master of Divinity from Boston University School of Theology and a Master of International Affairs from the Frederick S. Pardee School of Global Studies also of Boston University.

== Career ==
Young is a career member of the Senior Foreign Service; he was elevated to class of Minister-Counselor on January 30, 2018. His assignments have included being a Pearson Fellow; a Public Affairs Officer at the U.S. Embassy in Guatemala; and Director of the Office of International Religious Freedom in the Bureau of Democracy and Human Rights at the State Department. He has also served as deputy director in the Office of the Special Envoy for Sudan & South Sudan, and he also served as executive assistant to the Under Secretary for Democracy and Global Affairs at the State Department. Previously he served as Chargé d’Affaires, a.i. at the U.S. Embassy in Pretoria, South Africa and Deputy Chief of Mission at the U.S. Embassy in Abuja, Nigeria. From 2020 to 2021, he served as the Chargé d’Affaires at the U.S. Embassy in Lusaka, Zambia.

=== United States ambassador to Malawi ===
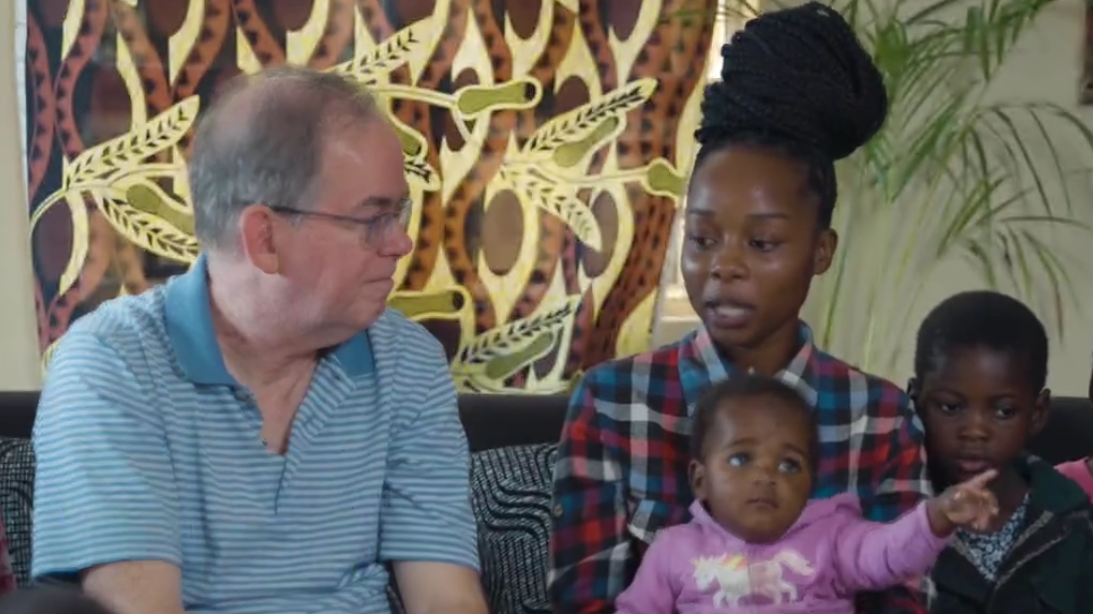
US Ambassador David Young visiting Tusayiwe Mkhondya in Mzuzu in 2023

On August 4, 2021, President Joe Biden nominated Young to be the next United States Ambassador to Malawi. On September 30, 2021, a hearing on his nomination was held before the Senate Foreign Relations Committee. On October 19, 2021, his nomination was reported favorably out of committee. On March 3, 2022, the Senate confirmed Young by voice vote. He presented his credentials to President Lazarus Chakwera on May 5, 2022. He retired on February 12, 2024, He is succeeded by Amy Diaz assumed duties as Chargé d’Affaires at the U.S. Embassy until a successor is nominated by the White House.

== Personal life ==
Born and raised in Kansas City, Missouri, he and his wife Diane Weisz Young have two children, Paul and Sarah. He speaks Spanish.

== See also ==
- List of ambassadors of the United States

Diplomatic posts
| Preceded by Daniel Lewis Foote | Chargé d’Affaires, ad interim of Zambia; 2020–2021 | Succeeded by Martin A. Dale; Chargé d’Affaires |
| Preceded by Robert K. Scott | United States Ambassador to Malawi; 2022–2024 | Succeeded by Amy W. Diaz; Chargé d’Affaires |
