= Embassy of the United States, Tehran =

United States of America's diplomatic mission in the Imperial State of Iran

- سفارت ایالات متحده آمریکا، تهران (Persian)
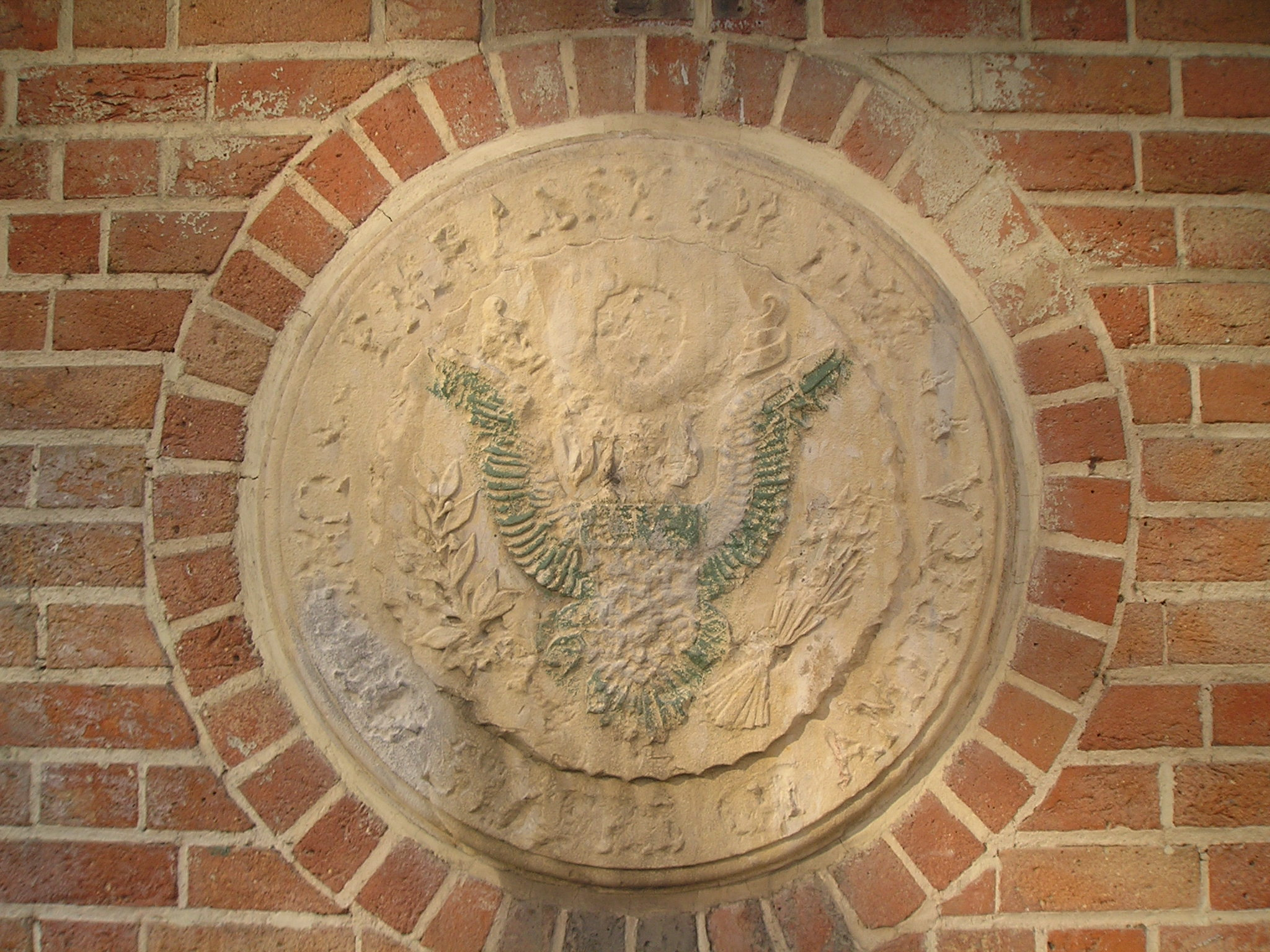
- Defaced Great Seal of the United States

- Location within Iran
- 35.708°N 51.424°E
- Location: Tehran, Iran

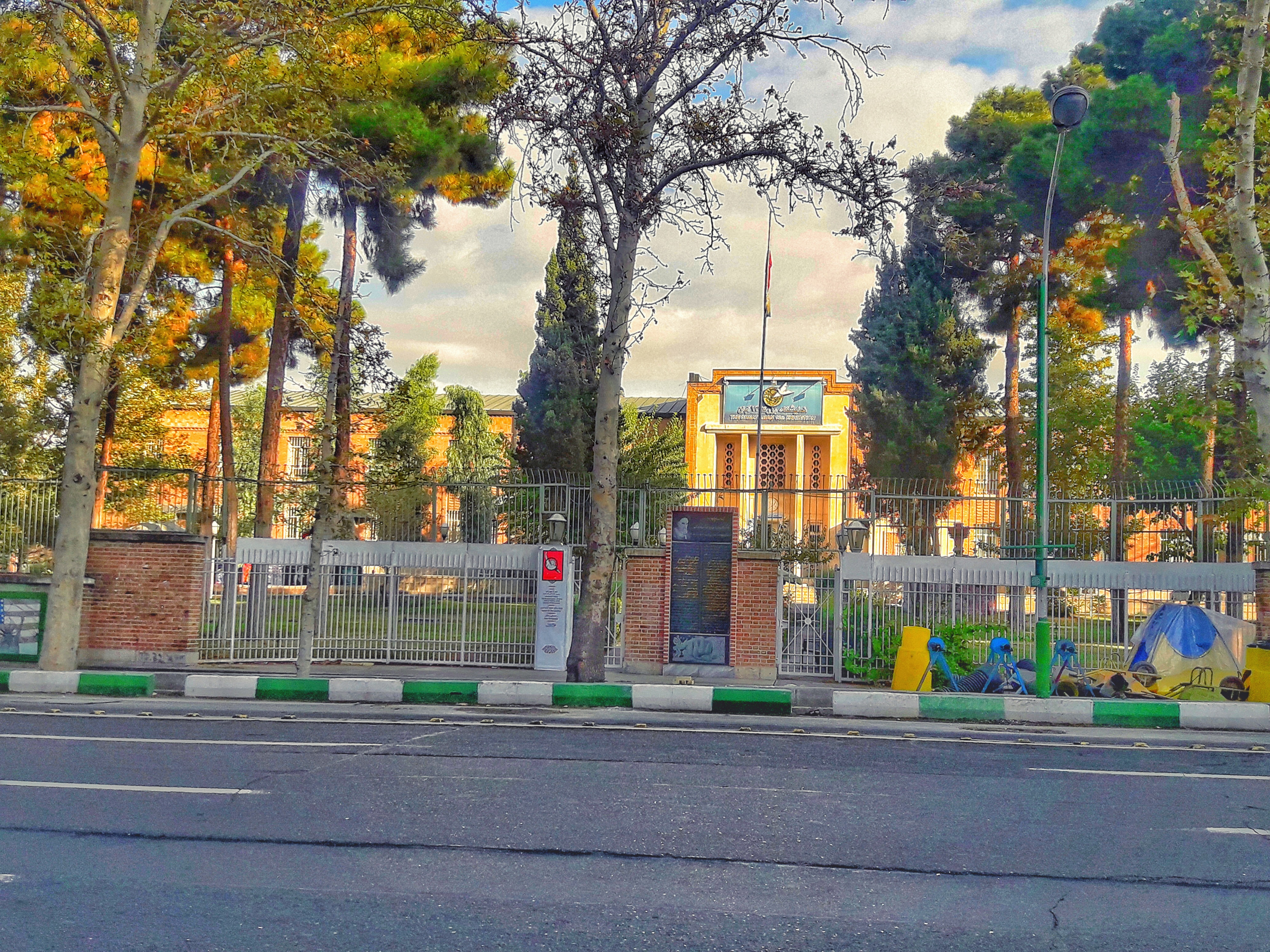
Chancery Building of the former Embassy of the United States to the former Imperial State of Iran (before 1979), seen from Taleghani Avenue – (photo taken in 2017)

The Embassy of the United States of America in Tehran (Persian: سفارت آمریکا در تهران) was the American diplomatic mission in the Imperial State of Iran. Direct bilateral diplomatic relations between the two governments were severed following the Iranian Revolution in 1979, and the subsequent seizure of the embassy in November 1979.

== History ==
The embassy was designed in 1948 by the architect Ides van der Gracht, the designer also of the Embassy of the United States in Ankara (Republic of Turkey). It was a long, low two-story brick building, similar in architectural style to many American high schools built in the 1930s and 1940s. For this reason, the building was nicknamed "Henderson High" by the local embassy staff, referring to Loy W. Henderson (1892–1986), who became America's ambassador to the Imperial State of Iran, to its Imperial government and the Shah of Iran, just after construction was completed in 1951.

The U.S. diplomatic mission has been defunct and the building has not been used by the Americans and their United States Department of State since the Iran hostage crisis of 1979–1980. Since then, the United States federal government has been represented in Iran to the successor Islamic Republic of Iran by the Protecting Power agreement with the United States Interests Section of the friendly neutral Embassy of Switzerland in Tehran. The name given to the compound by the embassy's occupiers and still used by many Iranians is variously translated as the "den of spies", "espionage den," "den of espionage", and "nest of spies".

After the fall and violent occupation of the American Embassy, the Islamic Revolutionary Guard Corps used it as a training center, and continue to maintain the complex. The brick walls that form the perimeter (the embassy grounds are the size of a city block) feature a number of anti-American murals commissioned by the government of Iran. The site has also housed a bookstore and a museum.

In April 2026, during reported hostilities between the United States and Iran, airstrikes and related military actions were reported to have taken place in and around Tehran, including areas near the former Embassy of the United States compound, which has been under Iranian control since 1979.

According to media reports, explosions in the vicinity caused damage to parts of the compound, with some sources indicating material damage to sections of the site and surrounding facilities. The complex, which has been used for state-affiliated exhibitions and a museum, was also reported to have been affected. The incident occurred amid wider strikes on infrastructure and symbolic sites in Tehran during the escalation of the conflict.

== Den of Espionage Museum ==
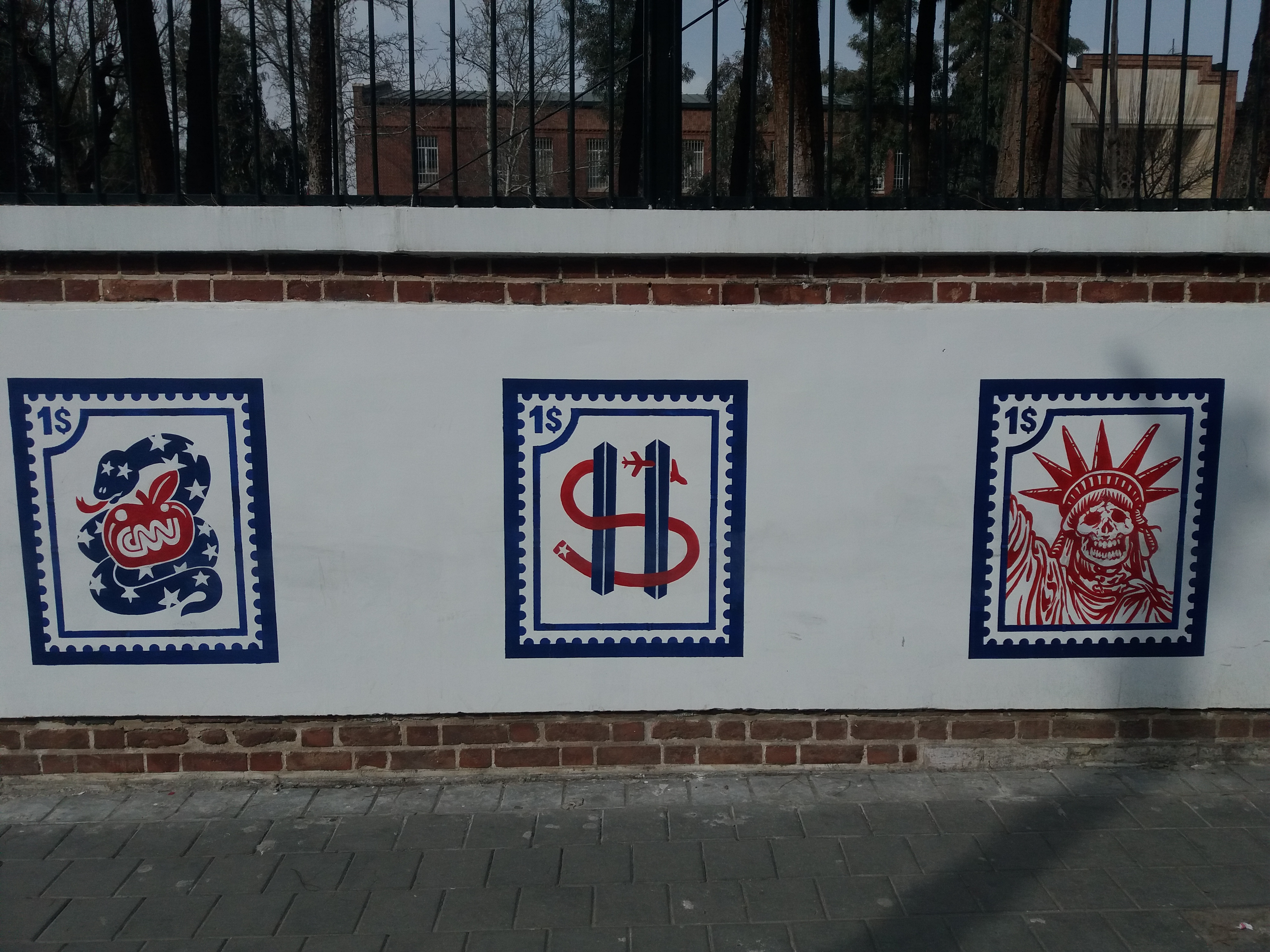
Anti-American propaganda at the former US embassy, Tehran

Part of the embassy has been turned into the Den of Espionage Museum. Reconstructions of soundproof dens, spying equipment and machinery, alongside the pieced-together shredded documents make up the exhibit.

Several Iranian college / university student organizations maintain offices in the former U.S. embassy complex. As of January 2017, the site is open to the Iranian public and foreigners. The decorative Great Seal of the United States is badly damaged, but still visible overhead at the building's entryway.

The Muslim Student Followers of the Imam's Line published documents seized in the embassy (including painstakingly reconstructed shredded documents) in a series of books called "Documents from the US Espionage Den" (Persian: اسناد لانه جاسوس امریكا, Asnād-e lāneh-e jasusi Amrikā). These books included telegrams, correspondence, and reports from the United States Department of State and Central Intelligence Agency, some of which remain classified to this day.

== U.S. Interests Section of the Swiss Embassy ==
When diplomatic relations were broken, the United States appointed Switzerland to be its protecting power in Iran. Informal relations are carried out through the United States Interests Section of the Swiss Embassy. Services for American citizens are limited. The section is not authorized to perform any U.S. visa/green card/immigration-related services. As of 2024, U.S. visa/green card services and interviews for Iranian citizens are conducted at U.S. embassies and consulates in other locations, namely Ankara, Dubai, and Yerevan whose U.S. embassies and consulates are staffed with Persian-speaking consular officers.

In February 2009, the Iranian police arrested Marco Kämpf, the Swiss diplomat acting as the First Secretary of the US Interests, after finding him in a compromising position in his car with an Iranian woman he had promised to marry. He was immediately recalled to Switzerland.

== Former Iranian Embassy in Washington, D.C. (United States) ==
The U.S. State Department seized the former Iranian Embassy at 3003–3005 Massachusetts Avenue, N.W. in Washington, D.C. in retaliation for the invasion, seizure and occupation of the U.S. Embassy in Tehran since 1979–1980. The Iranian Interests Section for any activities in the United States, operates out of the Pakistani Embassy (for the Islamic Republic of Pakistan).

== See also ==
- Iran hostage crisis
- Iran–United States relations
- List of ambassadors of the United States to Iran
- Embassy of the United Kingdom, Tehran
- Tehran American School
- Consulate-General of the United States, Tabriz
