= Simon Aronson =

American magician and lawyer (1943–2019)

- Born: 1943
- Died: December 10, 2019 (aged 75–76); Chicago, Illinois, U.S.
- Education: University of Chicago
- Spouse: Virginia Cook
- Parent(s): Annette and Arnold Aronson

Simon Aronson (1943 – 2019) was an American magician and lawyer. Aronson wrote a number of books which are "considered essential reading" for magicians. He is noted for his Aronson Stack card trick and the trick Shuffle-Bored. Two of his other tricks were performed by other magicians on Penn & Teller: Fool Us. For years, he also performed a mind-reading act with his wife.

== Early life and education ==
Aronson was born in 1943. He was the son of Annette and Arnold Aronson. His father was a co-founder of the Leadership Conference on Civil Rights. Aronson grew up in Rye, New York where he attended Milton School and Rye High School. Aronson started performing magic shows when he was about 8, including posting want ads in the newspaper. When he was 15, he started to appear on a local TV program as its junior magician.

Aronson attended the University of Chicago where he obtained a bachelor of arts in 1964, a master of arts in 1965, and a J.D. in 1973. He met his wife Virginia Cook when they were both law students at the University of Chicago.

== Career ==
Aronson became a real estate lawyer and a partner in the Chicago law firm of Lord, Bissell, and Brook, but he retired in 1999 to become a full-time magician.

Aronson wrote a number of books and released a number of DVDs. In 2016, Kevin Pang explained "Here’s the thing about card magic: Most tricks don’t get passed down from master to protégé... Card magicians learn their tricks from books.... Among the thousands of books on card magic, those by Solomon, Bannon, and Aronson are considered essential reading."

Aronson is noted for the Aronson Stack and the Shuffle-Bored. The Aronson Stack is the subject of a 2014 book by Geoff Williams, and had a significant effect on the profession by enabling more magicians to pull of card deck tricks without memorising the location of every card in a deck.

Two of Aronson's tricks were featured on Penn & Teller: Fool Us, both performed by other magicians: Prior Commitment, performed by Graham Jolley (which fooled Penn & Teller); and Shuffle-Bored, performed by Christopher Tracy and Jim Leach (which did not fool them; Penn noted he was already well-acquainted with the trick). Aronson also performed a mind-reading act with his wife.

== Death and personal life ==
Aronson died on 10 December 2019 at St Joseph's Hospital, Chicago. He was 76. He was survived by his wife Ginny, also a lawyer, and his brother, Bernard W. Aronson, a former Assistant Secretary of State. His first cousin was the singer-songwriter and activist, Si Kahn.

== Publications ==
- The Card Ideas of Simon Aronson (1978)
- A Stack to Remember (1979)
- Shuffle-Bored (1980)
- Sessions (1982, with David Solomon)
- The Aronson Approach (1990)
- Bound to Please (1994, compilation)
- Simply Simon (1995)
- Memories are Made of This (1999)
- Try the Impossible (2001)
- Art Decko (2014)
