= Horacio Rivero Jr. =

U. S. Navy officer

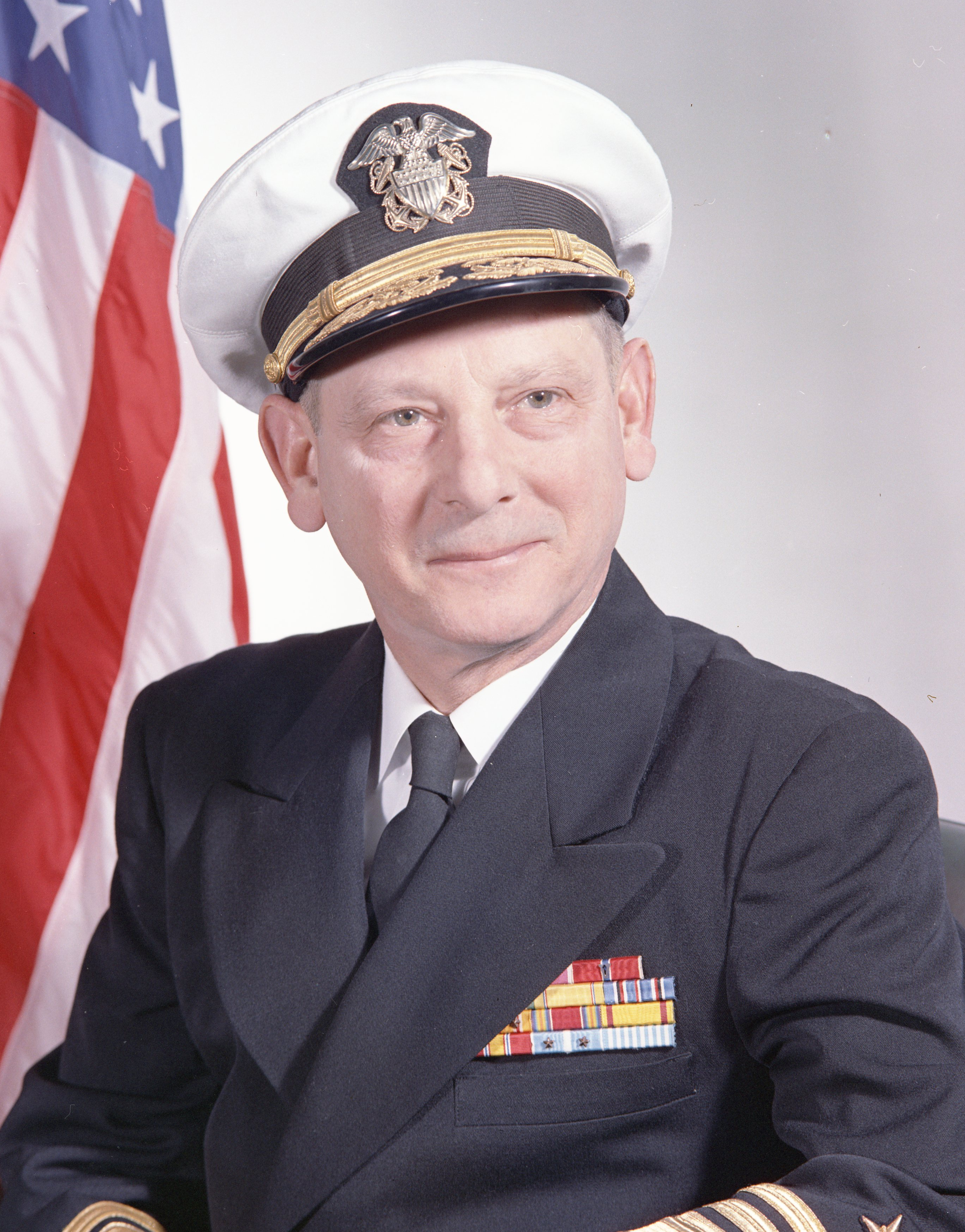
- Horacio Rivero Jr. in 1973
- Born: May 16, 1910; Ponce, Puerto Rico
- Died: September 24, 2000 (aged 90); Coronado, California, US
- Burial place: Fort Rosecrans National Cemetery; San Diego, California, US
- Education: United States Naval Academy (BS)
- Military career
- Allegiance: United States
- Branch: United States Navy
- Service years: 1931–1972
- Rank: Admiral
- Commands: USS William C. Lawe (DD-763); USS Noble (APA-218); Amphibious forces, Atlantic Fleet; Commander of Allied Forces in Southern Europe
- Conflicts: World War II; Korean War; Cuban Missile Crisis; Vietnam War
- Awards: Navy Distinguished Service Medal; Legion of Merit; Bronze Star with "V"
- Other work: U.S. Ambassador to Spain

54th United States Ambassador to Spain
- In office October 11, 1972 – November 26, 1974
- Preceded by: Robert C. Hill
- Succeeded by: Wells Stabler

Horacio Rivero Jr. (May 16, 1910 – September 24, 2000), was the first Puerto Rican and Hispanic four-star admiral, and the second Hispanic to hold that rank in the modern United States Navy, after the American Civil War Admiral David Glasgow Farragut (1801–1870). After retiring from the Navy, Rivero served as the U.S. Ambassador to Spain (1972–1974), and was also the first Hispanic to hold that position.

== Early years ==
Rivero was born and raised in the city of Ponce, located in the southern coast of Puerto Rico, He was graduated from Central High School in San Juan.

== Military career ==
On June 20, 1927, he received an appointment from the Honorable Felix Cordova Davila, Puerto Rico's Resident Commissioner, to attend the United States Naval Academy. On June 4, 1931, he graduated third in a class of 441 from the U.S. Naval Academy in Annapolis, Maryland. Rivero's first assignment was aboard the USS Northampton (CA-26). From 1932 to 1936 he served aboard the following ships: USS Chicago (CA-29), USS New Mexico (BB-40), USS California (BB-44) and USS Pennsylvania (BB-38). He earned his master's degree in electrical engineering from the Massachusetts Institute of Technology (MIT) in 1940 and in 1941 married Hazel Hooper.

=== World War II ===
During World War II, he served aboard the USS San Juan (CL-54) as a gunnery officer and was involved in providing artillery cover for Marines landing on Guadalcanal, Marshall Islands, Iwo Jima, and Okinawa. For his service he was awarded the Bronze Star with Combat "V". Rivero was reassigned to the USS Pittsburgh (CA-72). The Pittsburgh's bow had been torn off during a typhoon and Rivero's strategies saved his ship without a single life lost. For his actions, he was awarded the Legion of Merit. He also participated in the Battle of the Santa Cruz Islands, the attack on Bougainville in the Solomons, the capture of the Gilbert Islands and a series of carrier raids on Rabaul. On June 5, 1945, Rivero participated in the first carrier raids against Tokyo during operations in the vicinity of Nansei Shoto.

Rivero served as Assistant to the Assistant Chief of Naval Operations (Special Weapons) from August 1945 to February 1946. From February 1946 to June 1947, he served as a technical assistant on the Staff of Commander Joint Task Force One for Operation Crossroads, and was on the Staff of Commander, Joint Task Force Seven during the atomic weapons tests in Eniwetok in 1948.

=== Korean War ===
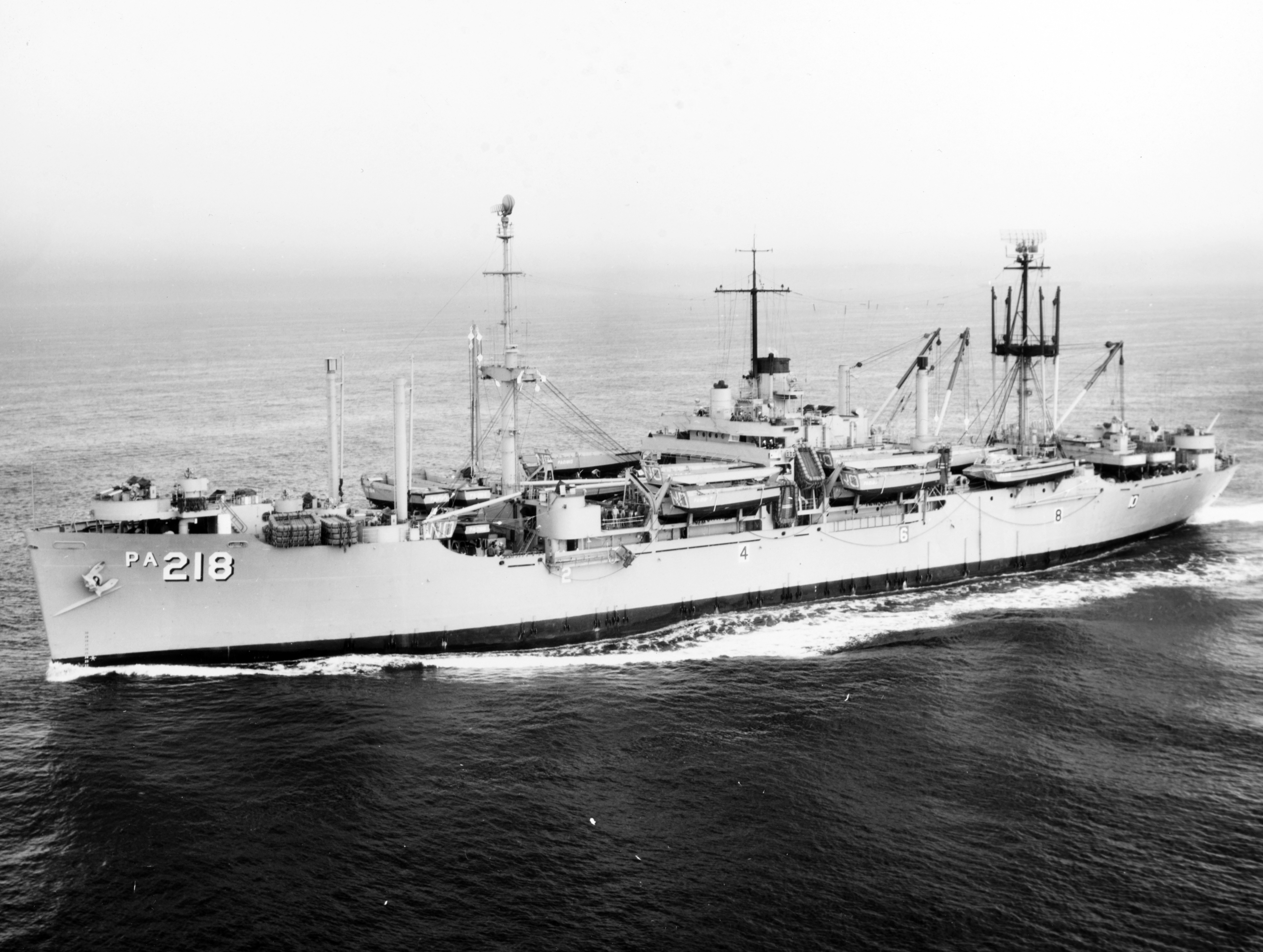
USS Noble

After the war, Rivero commanded the USS William C. Lawe (DD-763) and during the Korean War the USS Noble (APA-218). Under his command, the Noble steamed to Korea to participate in the September Inchon amphibious assault. Thereafter, the Noble assisted in the transport of U.S. and foreign troops and equipment to and from the Korean combat zone. In July 1953, the Noble participated in Operation Big Switch, moving Communist North Korean prisoners from Koje Do to Inchon pursuant to the armistice agreement.

Rivero studied nuclear weaponry at the National War College and in 1954 he became Assistant Chief of Staff for Naval Operations. In 1955, he was promoted to the rank of rear admiral and was a member of the Staff of the Commander in Chief, Western Atlantic Area.

Between January 1958 and March 1959, he served as Commander Destroyer Flotilla One (COMDESFLOT ONE) headquartered in Yokosuka, Japan.

=== Cuban Missile Crisis ===
The Cuban Missile Crisis was a tense confrontation between the Soviet Union and the United States over the Soviet deployment of nuclear missiles in Cuba. On October 22, 1962, Admiral Rivero was the commander of the American fleet sent by President John F. Kennedy to set up a quarantine (blockade) of the Soviet ships in an effort to stop the Cold War from escalating into World War III. On October 28, Soviet Premier Nikita Khrushchev ordered the removal of the Soviet missiles in Cuba, and Kennedy ordered an end of the quarantine of Cuba on November 20, bringing an end to the crisis.

Rivero was named Vice Chief of Naval Operations after the previous VCNO, Claude V. Ricketts, died in office on July 6, 1964. On July 31, 1964, Rivero became the first Puerto Rican, and the second Hispanic to become a four-star admiral in the modern era US Navy.

=== Vietnam War ===
During the Vietnam War, Rivero oversaw the day-to-day work of the Navy as the Vice Chief of Naval Operations. He was a stern supporter of a "brown-water navy," or riverine force, on the rivers of South Vietnam.

=== USS Liberty incident ===
While serving as the Vice Chief of Naval Operations, Admiral Rivero spoke out in favor of the survivors of the 1967 USS Liberty incident. He said his “most prominent memory of the Liberty” was “My anger and frustration at our not punishing the attackers.”

=== NATO commander ===
From 1968 until his retirement from the Navy in 1972, Admiral Rivero was the North Atlantic Treaty Organization's commander in chief of the Allied Forces in Southern Europe. He was responsible for the land, sea and air forces of five nations deployed in the Mediterranean area: Italy, Greece, Turkey, Britain and the United States. During his years as commander, some 215,000 of the 310,000 American troops in Europe were stationed in West Germany. At the time, Rivero believed that any withdrawal of United States troops from West Germany might affect the strength of the United States Sixth Fleet in the Mediterranean.

== Post-Navy career ==
After his retirement from the United States Navy in 1972, Admiral Rivero, served as the U.S. Ambassador to Spain under the administration of President Richard M. Nixon from 1972 to 1974. Rivero was also the Honorary Chairman of the American Veterans' Committee for Puerto Rico Self-Determination.

Rivero died on September 24, 2000, and was buried with full military honors in the Fort Rosecrans National Cemetery of San Diego, California. He was survived by a daughter, two grandchildren, two great-grandchildren, and two sisters, both of Puerto Rico. On November 11, 2008, the government of Puerto Rico unveiled in the Capitol Rotunda the oil portrait of Admiral Horacio Rivero Jr.

== Awards and recognitions ==
Among Admiral Rivero's decorations and medals were the following:

Surface Warfare Officer Insignia
	Navy Distinguished Service Medal w/ with two gold award stars	
Legion of Merit w/ gold star	Bronze Star w/ "V" Device	Navy and Marine Corps Commendation Medal
American Defense Service Medal w/ one service star	American Campaign Medal	Asiatic-Pacific Campaign Medal w/ seven service stars
World War II Victory Medal	National Defense Service Medal w/ one service star	Korean Service Medal w/ two service stars
Vietnam Service Medal w/ two service stars	United Nations Korea Medal	Vietnam Campaign Medal
Command at Sea insignia

On April 1, 2017, the United States Navy Reserve dedicated posthumously the Navy Operational Support Center NOSC building in Fort Buchanan, Puerto Rico, to Admiral Horacio Rivero Jr.

In 2017 Horacio Rivero Jr. was posthumously inducted to the Puerto Rico Veterans Hall of Fame.

== See also ==
- Hispanic Admirals in the United States Navy
- List of Puerto Ricans
- Puerto Ricans in World War II
- List of Puerto Rican military personnel
- Hispanics in the United States Navy
- Hispanics in the United States Naval Academy

Diplomatic posts
Preceded by Robert C. Hill	United States Ambassador to Spain; 1972–1984	Succeeded by Wells Stabler
Military offices
Preceded by Claude V. Ricketts	Vice Chief of Naval Operations; 1964–1968	Succeeded by Bernard A. Clarey
