= Frank V. Ortiz Jr. =

American diplomat (1926–2005)

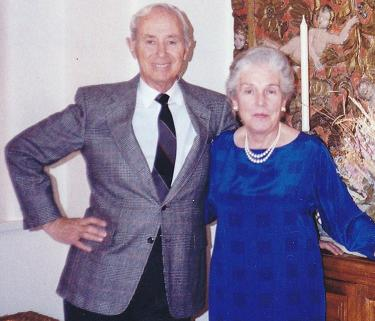
- Ambassador Ortiz and wife Dolores in the 1990s

42nd United States Ambassador to Argentina
- In office November 18, 1983 – August 29, 1986
- President: Ronald Reagan
- Preceded by: Harry W. Shlaudeman
- Succeeded by: Theodore E. Gildred

United States Ambassador to Peru
- In office November 10, 1981 – October 27, 1983
- President: Ronald Reagan
- Preceded by: Edwin Gharst Corr
- Succeeded by: David C. Jordan

United States Ambassador to Guatemala
- In office July 17, 1979 – August 6, 1980
- President: Jimmy Carter
- Preceded by: Davis E. Boster
- Succeeded by: Frederic L. Chapin

United States Ambassador to Barbados
- In office July 29, 1977 – May 15, 1979
- President: Jimmy Carter
- Preceded by: John Francis Maisto
- Succeeded by: Oliver P. Garza

United States Ambassador to Grenada
- In office July 29, 1977 – May 15, 1979
- President: Jimmy Carter
- Preceded by: Theodore R. Britton, Jr.
- Succeeded by: Sally Shelton-Colby

Personal details
- Born: March 14, 1926 Santa Fe, New Mexico, U.S.
- Died: February 27, 2005 (aged 78) Santa Fe, New Mexico, U.S.
- Spouse: Dolores Duke
- Education: Georgetown University; George Washington University
- Profession: Diplomat, Professor

Francis Vincent Ortiz Jr. (March 14, 1926 – February 27, 2005) was an American diplomat who served as United States Ambassador to Argentina from 1983 to 1986, United States Ambassador to Peru from 1981 to 1983, United States Ambassador to Guatemala from 1979 to 1980 and Ambassador of the United States to Barbados, and Grenada as well as Special Representative to Dominica, Saint Lucia, Antigua, St. Christopher-Nevis-Anguilla, and St. Vincent from 1977 to 1979.

== Biography ==
Ambassador Ortiz was born on March 14, 1926, to Frank Valencia Ortiz y Barbero (1896–1992) and Margaret Mary Delgado y Garcia de Noriega (1900–1993) in Santa Fe, New Mexico, where his family has lived since the 17th century. Both his parents were Democratic politicians. He had one younger sister and one younger brother. He graduated from Santa Fe High School. At age 17, he went to Washington, D.C., to work as an aide in the United States Senate. In 1945, he joined the United States Air Force and fought in World War II.

He received a B.S. from Georgetown University in 1950, and an M.S. from George Washington University in 1957. He also attended the University of Madrid in 1950, the American University of Beirut in 1952, and the National War College in 1956-1957. During his time at Georgetown, his roommate was Ismael Moreno Pino, who later served as Deputy Foreign Minister and Ambassador of Mexico, representing his country in Germany, the Netherlands, Chile, Peru, Venezuela, the OAS in Washington, D.C., and the UN in New York and Geneva, Switzerland; the two later coincided again as heads of mission in Lima.

Ortiz married Dolores Duke, with whom he had four children. Frank Ortiz died in Santa Fe on February 27, 2005, at the age of 78. Dolores Ortiz died in Santa Fe on December 27, 2013, at the age of 88.

== Career ==
From 1951 to 1953, he worked in the United States Department of State on issues pertaining to Egypt and Sudan. From 1953 to 1955, he was an economic officer in Addis Ababa, Ethiopia, and a political officer in Mexico City from 1955 to 1957. From 1957 to 1961, he worked as an assistant in the Department of State. From 1967 to 1970, he worked as a political counsellor in Lima, Peru, and as Deputy Chief of Mission in Montevideo, Uruguay from 1970 to 1973. From 1973 to 1975 he worked in the State Department with regards to Argentina, Uruguay, and Paraguay, and became Deputy Executive Secretary from 1975 to 1977.

From 1977 to 1979, he was ambassador to Barbados and Grenada, and special representative to Dominica and Saint Lucia. He was ambassador to Guatemala from 1979 to 1980. Then he was appointed political advisor to Southern Hemispheric Military Command in Panama. From 1981 to 1983, he was ambassador to Peru. He was then ambassador to Argentina from 1983 to 1986.

During the late 1980s he taught at the University of New Mexico. In 1990, he retired to Santa Fe and became very involved in preserving Spanish New Mexican culture and history at the New Mexico History Museum, the National Hispanic Cultural Center, Las Golondrinas and elsewhere.

== Works ==
- Ambassador Ortiz, Lessons from a Life of Service. University of New Mexico Press. 2005. ISBN 9780826337122.

Diplomatic posts
Preceded by Theodore R. Britton, Jr.	United States Ambassador to Barbados; July 14, 1977 – May 15, 1979	Succeeded by Sally Shelton-Colby
Preceded by Theodore R. Britton, Jr	United States Ambassador to Grenada; 1977–1979	Succeeded by Sally Shelton-Colby
Preceded by -	United States Ambassador to Dominica; 1977–1979	Succeeded by Sally Shelton-Colby
Preceded by -	United States Ambassador to Saint Lucia; 1977–1979	Succeeded by Sally Shelton-Colby
Preceded by -	United States Ambassador to Antigua; 1977–1979	Succeeded by Sally Shelton-Colby
Preceded by -	United States Ambassador to St. Christopher-Nevis-Anguilla; 1977–1979	Succeeded by Sally Shelton-Colby
Preceded by -	United States Ambassador to St. Vincent; 1977–1979	Succeeded by Sally Shelton-Colby
Preceded by Davis E. Boster	United States Ambassador to Guatemala; July 17, 1979 – August 6, 1980	Succeeded by Frederic L. Chapin
Preceded by Edwin Gharst Corr	United States Ambassador to Peru; October 1, 1981 – October 27, 1983	Succeeded by David C. Jordan
Preceded by Harry W. Shlaudeman	United States Ambassador to Argentina; November 29, 1983 – November 6, 1986	Succeeded by Theodore E. Gildred
