= Frederic L. Chapin =

American diplomat

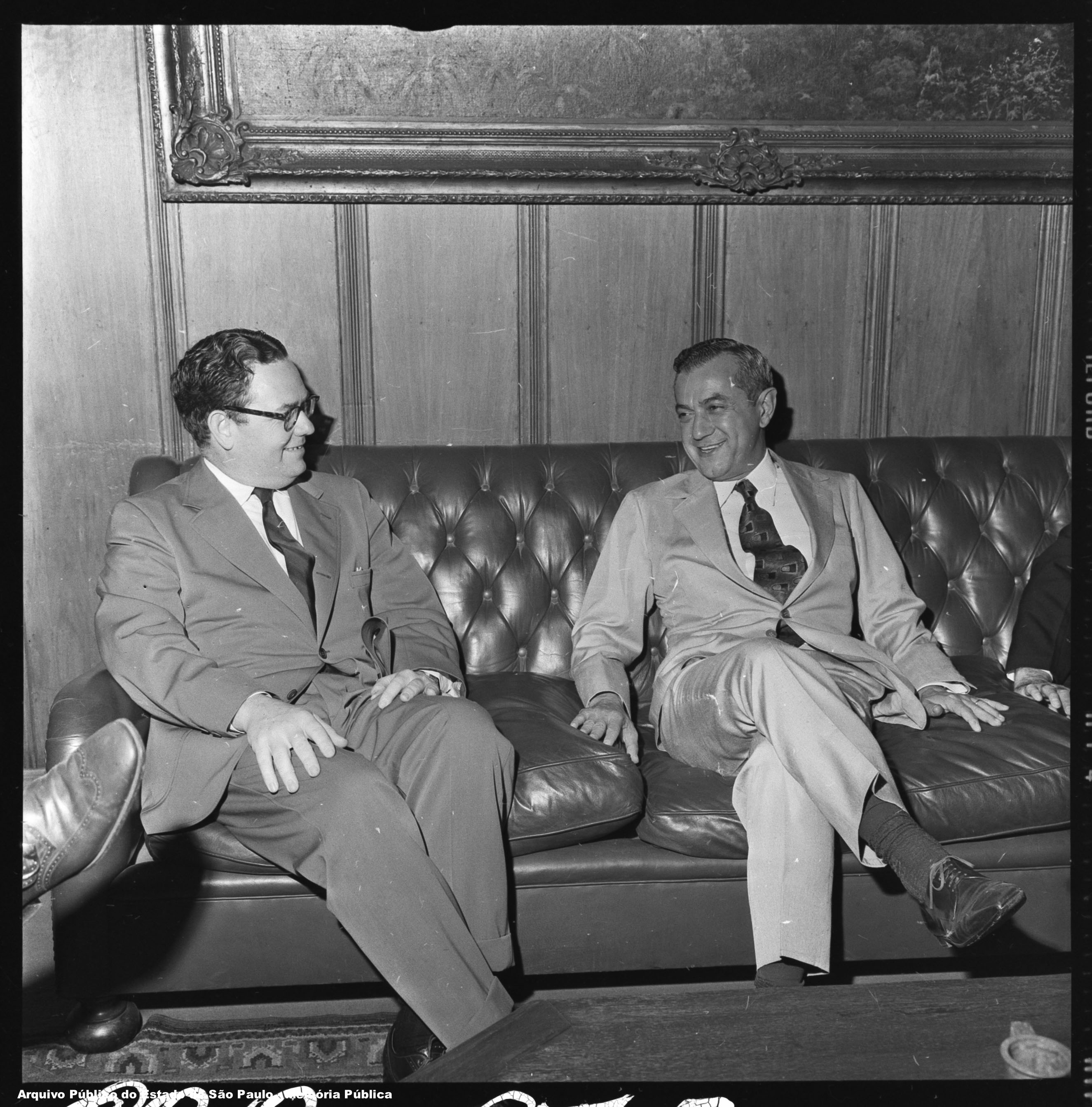
- Frederic L. Chapin and Laudo Natel, Governor of São Paulo, 1972. Arquivo Público do Estado de São Paulo

United States Ambassador to Guatemala
- In office September 3, 1981 – February 28, 1984
- President: Ronald Reagan
- Preceded by: Frank V. Ortiz, Jr.
- Succeeded by: Alberto Martinez Piedra

United States Ambassador to Ethiopia
- In office July 21, 1978 – July 29, 1980
- President: Jimmy Carter
- Preceded by: Arthur W. Hummel, Jr.
- Succeeded by: Marc Allen Baas

United States Ambassador to Chad Acting
- In office January 1961 – May 1961
- President: John F. Kennedy
- Preceded by: W. Wendell Blancke
- Succeeded by: John A. Calhoun

Personal details
- Born: Frederic Lincoln Chapin; July 13, 1929 New York City, New York, U.S.
- Died: September 8, 1989 (aged 60) Baltimore, Maryland, U.S.
- Spouse: Cornelia Clarke (m. 1952)
- Relations: Hope Cook (cousin)
- Children: 4
- Parent: Selden Chapin
- Education: St. Paul's School
- Alma mater: Harvard College

Frederic Lincoln Chapin (July 13, 1929 – September 8, 1989) was a United States diplomat. He was the ambassador to Ethiopia and Guatemala.

== Early life ==
Chapin was born in New York City on July 13, 1929. He was the son of Mary Paul (née Noyes) Chapin (1902–1984) and Selden Chapin (1899–1963), who served as the United States Ambassador to the Netherlands, Peru and Iran, who married in 1927. His sister was Helen Chapin (1928–2011), who married Ronald Irwin Metz (1921–2002) in 1951.

His maternal grandparents were Helen (née Humpstone) Noyes and Winchester Noyes, the president of J. H. Winchester & Company, an international shipping brokerage firm. His cousin Hope Cooke (b. 1940), who was a ward of his parents following the death of her parents, married King Palden Thondup Namgyal (1923–1982) in 1961 and became the Queen of Kingdom of Sikkim until their divorce in 1980. She later married Mike Wallace. His paternal grandparents were Frederic Lincoln Chapin (1863–1913) and Grace Card (née Selden) Chapin (1864–1941).

Chapin attended St. Paul's School in Concord, New Hampshire, and graduated from Harvard College, where he received a bachelor's degree in history, in 1950.

== Career ==
Following his graduation from Harvard, he worked in Washington, D.C. and in Paris as an economic analyst with the Economic Cooperation Administration, which directed the Marshall Plan. He joined the Foreign Service in 1952. Chapin served as the Chargé d'affaires ad interim in Chad for four month following the establishment of the Embassy in Fort Lamy (now N'Djamena) on February 1, 1961. Following his service in Chad, he was a special assistant to the Under Secretary of State for Political Affairs, W. Averell Harriman, until 1965. Harriman later served as the United States Secretary of Commercein the 1940s and Governor of New York in the 1950s.

Chapin then worked for the Agency for International Development, a Foreign Service examiner, was head of the country desk for Bolivia and Chile, and from 1970 to 1972, he was consul general in Sao Paulo, Brazil. On June 27, 1978, Chapin was appointed as the U.S. Ambassador to Ethiopia by President Jimmy Carter to succeed Arthur W. Hummel, Jr. He presented his credentials on July 21, 1978, and served until he was recalled from his post on July 29, 1980, during a dispute about human rights where Ethiopia requested the withdrawal of Chapin.

Following his service in Ethiopia, he was a Deputy Assistant Secretary of Defense, charged with international security affairs in Latin America. In 1981, he was the interim charge d'affaires in the American Embassy in El Salvador after the removal of Ambassador Robert E. White. On July 30, 1981, Chapin was appointed by President Ronald Reagan as the U.S. Ambassador to Guatemala, to succeed Frank V. Ortiz, Jr. He presented his credentials on September 3, 1981, and served until February 28, 1984, when he left his post. While in Guatemala, there was much unrest and at least one foiled coup d'état.

Until his retirement from the Foreign Service, with the rank of career minister, in 1988, he served as a senior inspector in the State Department. Chapin was a secretary treasurer of the American Foreign Service Protective Association and a member of the editorial board of the Foreign Service Journal.

== Personal life ==
On August 2, 1952, Chapin was married to Cornelia Bonner Clarke (1931–1990) at the Christ Episcopal Church in New Brunswick, New Jersey. Cornelia, an alumnus of Miss Fine's School in Princeton and a Vassar College graduate, was the daughter of Dr. and Mrs. Francis Mann Clarke. Together, they were the parents of one son and three daughters: John Chapin, Anne Chapin, Edith Chapin, and Grace Selden Chapin, who married Thomas Charles Ruska, the CFO of the Colonial Packaging Company, in Norcross, Georgia, in 1986.

Chapin died of cancer at the Johns Hopkins Hospital in Baltimore, Maryland on September 8, 1989.

Diplomatic posts
| Preceded by Arthur W. Hummel, Jr. | U.S. Ambassador to Ethiopia; 1978–1980 | Succeeded by Marc Allen Baas |
| Preceded by Frank V. Ortiz, Jr. | U.S. Ambassador to Guatemala; 1981–1984 | Succeeded by Alberto Martinez Piedra |
