= Michael McKinley =

American diplomat (born 1954)

Mike McKinley
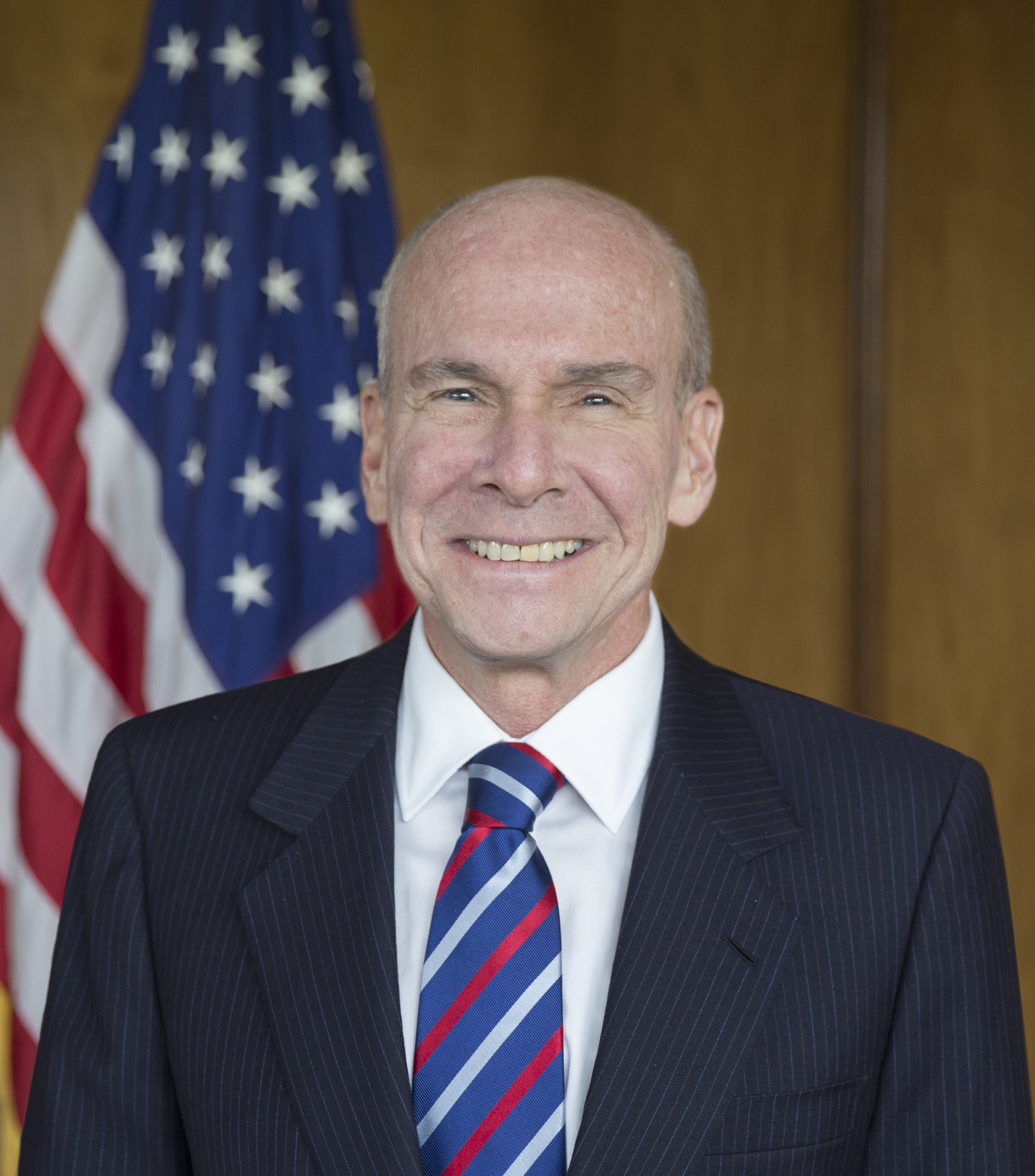

United States Ambassador to Brazil
- In office January 20, 2017 – November 3, 2018
- President: Barack Obama; Donald Trump
- Preceded by: Liliana Ayalde
- Succeeded by: Todd C. Chapman

21st United States Ambassador to Afghanistan
- In office January 6, 2015 – December 18, 2016
- President: Barack Obama
- Preceded by: James Cunningham
- Succeeded by: John R. Bass

United States Ambassador to Colombia
- In office September 14, 2010 – September 1, 2013
- President: Barack Obama
- Preceded by: William Brownfield
- Succeeded by: Kevin Whitaker

United States Ambassador to Peru
- In office August 27, 2007 – July 14, 2010
- President: George W. Bush; Barack Obama
- Preceded by: Curtis Struble
- Succeeded by: Rose Likins

United States Ambassador to the European Union Acting
- In office June 18, 2005 – January 20, 2006
- President: George W. Bush
- Preceded by: Rockwell A. Schnabel
- Succeeded by: C. Boyden Gray

United States Ambassador to Mozambique Acting
- In office July 20, 1996 – December 3, 1997
- President: Bill Clinton
- Preceded by: Dennis Jett
- Succeeded by: Brian Curran

Personal details
- Born: Peter Michael McKinley; January 1954 (age 72) Caracas, Venezuela
- Spouse: Fatima Salces Arce
- Education: University of Southampton (BA); Linacre College, Oxford (MPhil, PhD)

Peter Michael McKinley (born January 1954) is an American diplomat. A career Foreign Service Officer, McKinley served as U.S. Ambassador to Peru (2007–2010), Colombia (2010–2013), Afghanistan (2015–2016), and Brazil (2017–2018), and then as Senior Adviser to the U.S. Secretary of State (2018–2019).

== Early life and education ==
McKinley was born in Caracas, Venezuela, and grew up in Brazil, Mexico, Spain, and the United States. McKinley earned a B.A. from Southampton University and an M.Phil. and D.Phil. from the University of Oxford. He was a member of Linacre College, Oxford.

== Career ==
McKinley joined the Foreign Service in 1982. He was based in Bolivia from 1983 until 1985 and had three tours of duty at the State Department's headquarters in Washington from 1985 until 1990. He then served in the U.S. Embassy in London from 1990 until 1994 and as deputy chief of mission and chargé d'affaires at U.S. Embassies in Mozambique, Uganda, and Belgium from 1994 until 2001. He was chargé d'affaires ad interim at the U.S. Embassy in Mozambique from July 1996 to December 1997.

From 2001 until 2004, McKinley served as Deputy Assistant Secretary in the State Department's Bureau of Population, Refugees, and Migration. He then was deputy chief of mission and chargé d' affaires at the U.S. Mission to the European Union in Brussels from 2004 to 2007.

McKinley served as the U.S. Ambassador to Peru from 2007 to 2010 and United States Ambassador to Colombia from 2010 to 2013. The United States Senate confirmed McKinley's nomination to both posts by voice vote. As ambassador to Colombia, McKinley demanded the release of an American man who had been abducted by the militant group FARC; the man was later released. McKinley was U.S. Deputy Ambassador to Afghanistan from 2013 to 2014.

On December 9, 2014, the Senate confirmed McKinley to be the U.S. Ambassador to Afghanistan by voice vote. He presented his credentials in Kabul on January 6, 2015. During a tense period of political instability in 2016, McKinley met nearly daily between Afghan President Ashraf Ghani and his coalition partner, Chief Executive Abdullah Abdullah; McKinley acted as a mediator and engaged in shuttle diplomacy to try to preserve the fragile national coalition government and stymie an upsurge in Taliban activity in Afghanistan. As U.S. Ambassador, McKinley called upon the Afghan government to conduct a full, transparent investigation into the allegations of Ahmad Ishchi of Jowzjan Province, who in 2016 accused General Abdul Rashid Dostum of abducting and torturing him.

McKinley served as U.S. Ambassador to Afghanistan until December 18, 2016, upon being appointed U.S. Ambassador to Brazil. On September 8, 2016 the Senate confirmed McKinley to be the U.S. Ambassador to Brazil by a vote of 92–0. He presented his credentials on January 20, 2017 and served until November 3, 2018, when he took up the post of Senior Advisor to the Secretary of State.

On October 10, 2019, McKinley resigned from the State Department in protest of the failure of Secretary of State Mike Pompeo to support department employees, including U.S. Ambassador to Ukraine Marie Yovanovitch, in connection with the Trump–Ukraine scandal. On October 16, 2019, McKinley gave deposition testimony to the House Intelligence, Foreign Affairs, and Oversight committees in the impeachment inquiry against Donald Trump. McKinley's testimony was publicly released on November 4, 2019. McKinley testified that his resignation was prompted in part by the Trump administration's attempted use of U.S. diplomatic missions "to procure negative political information for domestic purposes, combined with the failure I saw in the building to provide support for our professional cadre in a particularly trying time." McKinley testified: "I was disturbed by the implication that foreign governments were being approached to procure negative information on political opponents." McKinley testified that another senior official, Deputy Assistant Secretary of State for European and Eurasian Affairs George P. Kent, had told him that he felt bullied by the department, that the department's legal advisor was seeking to "shut him up," and that State Department leadership was failing to timely provide document requests from Congress to him. Kent provided a memo to McKinley detailing his concerns, which McKinley forwarded to Under Secretary of State for Political Affairs David Hale, acting legal adviser Marik String, and Deputy Secretary of State John J. Sullivan, but received no response. McKinley's testimony, and that of other high-ranking U.S. diplomats, revealed deep discontent among the U.S. diplomatic corps with Pompeo's leadership.

In 2020, McKinley, along with over 130 other former Republican national security officials, signed a statement that asserted that President Trump was unfit to serve another term, and "To that end, we are firmly convinced that it is in the best interest of our nation that Vice President Joe Biden be elected as the next President of the United States, and we will vote for him."

== Published works ==
McKinley's Pre-revolutionary Caracas: Politics, Economy and Society 1777-1811 (1985), a history of colonial Venezuela, was published by Cambridge University Press and also appeared in a Spanish edition. A 1988 book review in the American Historical Review described it as "the first English-language monograph to appear on colonial Venezuela in over ten years and ... the first in language to provide a broad synthesis of the late colonial period."

== Personal life ==
He is married to Fatima Salces Arce; they have three children. In addition to English, McKinley speaks Spanish, French, and Portuguese.

== See also ==
- List of current ambassadors of the United States
- Trump–Ukraine scandal

Diplomatic posts
Preceded by Dennis Jett	United States Ambassador to Mozambique; Acting; 1996–1997	Succeeded by Brian Curran
Preceded by Rockwell A. Schnabel	United States Ambassador to the European Union; Acting; 2005–2006	Succeeded by C. Boyden Gray
Preceded by Curtis Struble	United States Ambassador to Peru; 2007–2010	Succeeded by Rose Likins
Preceded by William Brownfield	United States Ambassador to Colombia; 2010–2013	Succeeded by Kevin Whitaker
Preceded by James Cunningham	United States Ambassador to Afghanistan; 2015–2016	Succeeded by John R. Bass
Preceded by Liliana Ayalde	United States Ambassador to Brazil; 2017–2018	Succeeded by Todd C. Chapman
