= Harry W. Shlaudeman =

American diplomat (1926–2018)

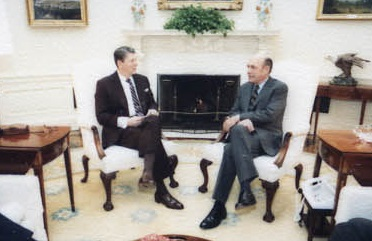
- Shlaudeman with Ronald Reagan in 1984

United States Ambassador to Nicaragua
- In office June 21, 1990 – March 14, 1992
- President: George H. W. Bush
- Preceded by: Richard Huntington Melton
- Succeeded by: John Francis Maisto

United States Ambassador to Brazil
- In office August 5, 1986 – May 14, 1989
- President: Ronald Reagan; George H. W. Bush
- Preceded by: Diego C. Asencio
- Succeeded by: Richard Huntington Melton

41st United States Ambassador to Argentina
- In office October 2, 1980 – August 26, 1983
- President: Jimmy Carter; Ronald Reagan
- Preceded by: Raúl H. Castro
- Succeeded by: Frank V. Ortiz, Jr.

United States Ambassador to Peru
- In office June 28, 1977 – October 20, 1980
- President: Jimmy Carter
- Preceded by: Robert W. Dean
- Succeeded by: Edwin Gharst Corr

17th Assistant Secretary of State for Inter-American Affairs
- In office July 22, 1976 – March 14, 1977
- President: Gerald Ford
- Preceded by: William D. Rogers
- Succeeded by: Terence Todman

United States Ambassador to Venezuela
- In office May 9, 1975 – May 14, 1976
- President: Gerald Ford
- Preceded by: Robert McClintock
- Succeeded by: Viron P. Vaky

Personal details
- Born: Harry Walter Shlaudeman; May 17, 1926 Los Angeles, California, U.S.
- Died: December 5, 2018 (aged 92)
- Profession: Diplomat
- Awards: Presidential Medal of Freedom

Harry Walter Shlaudeman (May 17, 1926 – December 5, 2018) was an American diplomat, who served successively as Ambassador to Venezuela, Peru, Argentina, Brazil, and Nicaragua.

== Biography ==
Shlaudeman was born in Los Angeles, California, on May 17, 1926. During World War II, he served in the United States Marine Corps from 1944 to 1946. After the war, he attended Stanford University, receiving his B.A. in 1952. Shlaudeman died on December 5, 2018, in San Luis Obispo, California, at the age of 92.

== Foreign service career ==
Shlaudeman joined the United States Foreign Service in 1954. As a Foreign Service Officer, he was posted to Barranquilla 1955–56; to Bogotá 1956–1958; to Sofia 1959–1962; and to Santo Domingo 1962–1964. He moved to Washington, D.C., in 1964, becoming the Dominican Republic desk officer in the United States Department of State. In 1965, he became assistant director of the State Department's Office of Caribbean Affairs, and also served as an advisor to Ellsworth Bunker, the United States Ambassador to the Organization of American States. From 1967 to 1969, he was special assistant to United States Secretary of State Dean Rusk. He returned to the field in 1969 as deputy chief of mission in Santiago, Chile, and then returned to the U.S. in 1973 to become Deputy Assistant Secretary of State for Inter-American Affairs.

President of the United States Gerald Ford nominated Shlaudeman as United States Ambassador to Venezuela and he held this post from May 9, 1975, until May 14, 1976. Ford next nominated Shlaudeman as Assistant Secretary of State for Inter-American Affairs, and he held this office from July 22, 1976, until March 14, 1977. President Jimmy Carter nominated him as United States Ambassador to Peru, holding this post from June 28, 1977, until October 20, 1980. Carter then named him United States Ambassador to Argentina, holding this post from November 4, 1980, until August 26, 1983, during the Falklands War.

Shlaudeman spent 1983–84 as a member of the National Bipartisan Commission on Central America. In 1984, President Ronald Reagan named Shlaudeman as the President's Special Envoy for Central America. He then served as United States Ambassador to Brazil from August 5, 1986, until May 14, 1989. President George H. W. Bush then nominated him as United States Ambassador to Nicaragua and he served in this post from June 21, 1990, until March 14, 1992. Shlaudeman received the Presidential Medal of Freedom in 1992.

Diplomatic posts
Preceded by Robert McClintock	United States Ambassador to Venezuela; May 9, 1975 – May 14, 1976	Succeeded by Viron P. Vaky
Preceded by Robert W. Dean	United States Ambassador to Peru; June 28, 1977 – October 20, 1980	Succeeded by Edwin G. Corr
Preceded by Raul Hector Castro	United States Ambassador to Argentina; November 4, 1980 – August 26, 1983	Succeeded by Frank V. Ortiz, Jr.
Preceded by Diego C. Asencio	United States Ambassador to Brazil; August 5, 1986 – May 14, 1989	Succeeded by Richard Huntington Melton
Preceded by Jack Leonard	United States Ambassador to Nicaragua; June 21, 1990 – March 14, 1992	Succeeded by John Maisto
Government offices
Preceded by William D. Rogers	Assistant Secretary of State for Inter-American Affairs; July 22, 1976 – March 14, 1977	Succeeded by Terence Todman
