= Krishna R. Urs =

American diplomat

Krishna Urs
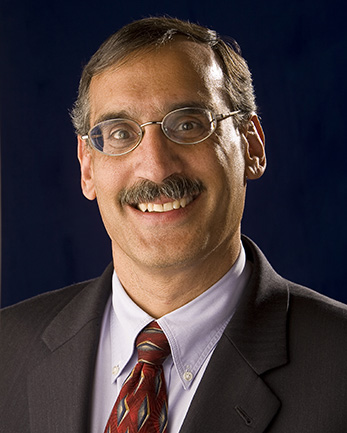

United States Ambassador to Peru
- In office October 25, 2017 – July 29, 2020
- President: Donald Trump
- Preceded by: Brian A. Nichols
- Succeeded by: Lisa D. Kenna

Personal details
- Born: Cheshire, Connecticut
- Spouse: Denise
- Children: 2
- Education: Georgetown University; University of Texas

Krishna Raj Urs is an American diplomat who served as the United States Ambassador to Peru from 2017 to 2020.

== Early life ==
Urs was born in Cheshire, Connecticut. He is of Indian descent.

Urs graduated from Cheshire High School in 1976 before attending Georgetown University, where he earned a bachelor's degree in foreign service in 1980. Urs spent his junior year of college studying abroad in Quito, Ecuador. He received a master's degree in international economics from the University of Texas in 1985.

== Career ==
Urs has served as a career diplomat for the United States since 1986. He has completed diplomatic posts in Mexico, the Dominican Republic, Peru, Nicaragua, and Bangladesh. He has also served as the Pakistan Desk Officer for the United States Department of State and worked for the United States Department of the Treasury's Office of Latin American and Caribbean Affairs.

Urs has served as the Deputy Assistant Secretary for Transportation Affairs and Chief U.S. Government Aviation Negotiator at the Department of State; as Director in the Office of Aviation Negotiations in the Bureau of Economic, Energy and Business Affairs in the Department of State; as Deputy Chief of Mission and chargé d'affaires at the U.S. Embassy in La Paz, Bolivia; and as Director of the Office of Economic Policy and Summit Coordination in the Bureau of Western Hemisphere Affairs at the Department of State.

In June 2014, Urs became Deputy Chief of Mission at the U.S. Embassy in Madrid. In January 2017, he was named the mission's chargé d'affaires.

Urs was confirmed by the United States Senate as the next United States Ambassador to Peru in August 2017. He had been nominated to the position in June 2017 by President Donald Trump. Urs presented his credentials to the President of Peru on October 25, 2017. He left his post on July 29, 2020.

In March 2020, amidst the coronavirus pandemic, Urs departed Peru due to what the embassy called "medical concerns" while American citizens were still stranded in the country. A different State Department official was then dispatched to Peru to oversee the repatriation of U.S. citizens stranded in Peru.

== Personal life ==
Urs speaks fluent Spanish as well as some Hindi and Telugu.

Diplomatic posts
Preceded by Brian A. Nichols	United States Ambassador to Peru; 2017–2020	Succeeded by Lisa D. Kenna
