= Alexander Watson (diplomat) =

American diplomat

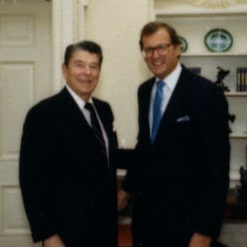
- Watson in 1988, right

Personal details
- Born: August 8, 1939 (age 87) Boston, Massachusetts, U.S.
- Education: Harvard College; University of Wisconsin, Madison

Alexander Watson

25th Assistant Secretary of State for Inter-American Affairs
- In office July 2, 1993 – March 29, 1996
- Preceded by: Bernard W. Aronson
- Succeeded by: Jeffrey Davidow

Alexander Fletcher Watson (born August 8, 1939) is an American retired ambassador and diplomat. He served as United States Ambassador to Peru from 1986 to 1989.

== Biography ==
Watson was born in Boston, Massachusetts. He attended Harvard College, earning an A.B. in government in 1961, and joined the Foreign Service in 1962.

He served as Vice Consul/Third Secretary at the American embassy in Santo Domingo, Dominican Republic, and in 1964 became Vice Consul at the embassy in Madrid, Spain. He left Spain in 1966 to become an intelligence analyst at the State Department's Bureau of Intelligence and Research. He continued to serve as an intelligence analyst until 1968, when he began attending the University of Wisconsin–Madison, graduating with his master's degree a year later.

From 1969 to 1972, Watson again worked overseas, this time in Brazil. He served his first six months in the country as a Political Officer at the embassy in Brasília and then as Consul and Principal Officer in the American Consulate in Salvador da Bahia until July 1973 when he returned to the U.S. to work as a Country Officer in the Office of Brazilian Affairs, a division of the State Department's Bureau of Inter-American Affairs.

In 1975, he was transferred to the Bureau of Economic and Business Affairs, becoming Special Assistant for Legislative and Public Affairs to the Assistant Secretary. In 1977, Watson was promoted to Deputy Director of the Office of Development Finance, and one year later became Director. In 1979, Watson returned to Latin America, serving successively as Deputy Chief of Mission in three American embassies: La Paz, Bolivia (1979–1981); Bogotá, Colombia (1981–1984) and Brasília, Brazil (1984–1986).

In 1986, Watson became the U.S. Ambassador to Peru, serving until 1989. In that year, he became Deputy Permanent U.S. Representative to the United Nations, holding this post until 1993, when Watson was appointed Assistant Secretary of State for Inter-American Affairs by President Bill Clinton, retiring near the end of Clinton's first term in 1996.

After Watson retired, The Nature Conservancy appointed him in 1996 as Vice President and Executive Director of its Latin America and the Caribbean division and subsequently as Vice President and Executive Director of The Nature Conservancy's International Conservation Program. In 2002 he left that position, and now works as Managing Director at Hills & Co International Consultants.

Watson has served on the boards of several non-profit organizations, including the Pan American Development Foundation, the Una Chapman Cox Foundation, PCI Media Impact, the Inter-American Foundation, the Latin America Program of the Wilson Center for International Scholars, LASPAU and the Maryland/DC Chapter of The Nature Conservancy. In 2004, he joined Diplomats and Military Commanders for Change, a group of retired diplomats and military commanders opposed because of the Iraq war to the reelection of President George W. Bush.

He speaks Spanish and Portuguese. He is married to Judith Tuttle, and has two children, David Watson and Caitlin Watson. Watson's father is Fletcher G. Watson, former professor of science education at Harvard.

Diplomatic posts
Preceded by Marvin Weissman	United States Chargé d'affairs ad interim, Bolivia; July 1980–September 1981	Succeeded by Edwin G. Corr
Preceded by David C. Jordan	United States Ambassador to Peru; 27 November 1986–9 August 1989	Succeeded by Anthony Quainton
Government offices
Preceded by Bernard W. Aronson	Assistant Secretary of State for Inter-American Affairs; July 2, 1993 – March 29, 1996	Succeeded by Jeffrey Davidow
