= Keith L. Brown (diplomat) =

American diplomat

Keith Lapham Brown (June 18, 1925 – July 29, 2016) was an American lawyer, businessman, and former U.S. ambassador.

== Biography ==
Brown was born in Sterling, Illinois. After graduating from Sterling High School, he enlisted in the U.S. Navy in 1943 and spent three years training at the University of Illinois, the University of Texas, and Harvard University before serving in the Philippines. In 1949, Brown earned his LL.B. at the University of Texas School of Law, where he was a member of the Texas Cowboys. He then began working for the law practice of Land, Byrd, Cross & Ladon.

After a short stint teaching law, he served as Vice President of Caulkins Oil Company from 1955 to 1970, and as president and chairman of the Brown Investment Corporation. Brown served as the United States Ambassador to Lesotho from 1982 to 1983, and as United States Ambassador to Denmark from 1989 to 1992.

Brown has served as director, advisory board member, trustee, and chairman to numerous organizations, including Vail Associates, Inc., which he co-founded in 1971. He has been an active member of the Republican Party for over 40 years, including service as chairman of the Republican National Finance Committee and numerous campaign committees. He died on July 29, 2016, at the age of 91.

Diplomatic posts
Preceded by John R. Clingerman	United States Ambassador to Lesotho; 1982–1983	Succeeded by Shirley Abbott
Preceded by Terence A. Todman	United States Ambassador to Denmark; 1988–1992	Succeeded by Richard B. Stone
