= Theodore E. Gildred =

American businessman and diplomat (1935–2019)

- Gildred in 1993

43rd United States Ambassador to Argentina
- In office November 6, 1986 – May 31, 1989
- President: Ronald Reagan
- Preceded by: Frank V. Ortiz, Jr.
- Succeeded by: Terence A. Todman

Personal details
- Born: Theodore Edmonds Gildred; October 18, 1935 Mexico City, Mexico
- Died: January 3, 2019 (aged 83) Montana, US
- Spouse(s): Suzanne Gail Green (m. 1961, div. 1974); Stephanie Ann Moscini (m. 1979, div. 1990); Heidi Coppin Dunn (m. 1994)
- Children: 6
- Education: Stanford University
- Occupation: developer, banker
- Profession: Diplomat, Businessman

Theodore Edmonds Gildred Jr. (October 18, 1935 – January 3, 2019) was a Mexican-born American businessman and diplomat.

== Life ==
Gildred was born in Mexico City. He served in the United States Army from 1955 to 1959, where he was stationed in Germany, and the United States Air Force Reserve from 1959 to 1969, in which he became a captain. He graduated from Stanford University in 1959. In 1960, he studied at the Sorbonne, and the Heidelberg University.

From 1986 to 1989, he was United States Ambassador to Argentina.

He developed Lomas Santa Fe community development and Country Club, and founded the Gildred Foundation to support Latin American studies at Stanford University and University of California, San Diego.

A pilot, Gildred was, like his father before him, inducted into the San Diego Air & Space Museum Hall of Fame.

He died in Montana on January 3, 2019, at the age of 83. He had been ill for some time.

== Family ==
In December 1961, he married Suzanne Gail Green of Newport Beach, California. They had four children. They divorced in 1974. In 1979, he married Stephanie Ann Moscini. They had two children. They divorced in 1990. In 1994, he married Heidi Dunn. They remained married until his death, and lived in San Diego, California.
