= Edwin G. Corr =

American diplomat (1934–2026)

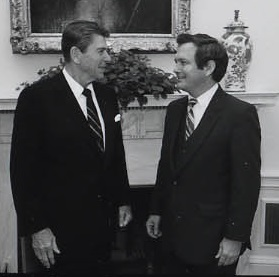
Ronald Reagan and Corr in the Oval Office in 1981

Edwin Gharst Corr (August 6, 1934 – February 11, 2026) was an American diplomat who served as a United States Ambassador to several Latin-American nations.

== Early life and education ==
Corr was born on August 6, 1934, and was from Norman, Oklahoma. In 1957, he received a B.A. from the University of Oklahoma. Corr also had an M.A. from the University of Oklahoma in 1961. He was in the Marine Corps from 1957 to 1960.

== Foreign Service ==
Corr joined the Foreign Service in 1961.

Between 1978 and 1980 he served as Deputy Assistant Secretary of State for International Narcotics Matters.

Corr served as U.S. Ambassador to Peru (1980–1981), U.S. Ambassador to Bolivia (1981–1985), and U.S. Ambassador to El Salvador (1985–1988).

== Iran-Contra ==
Corr was investigated between 1986 and 1991 for possible involvement in the Iran-Contra scandal. Corr gave voluntary interviews to the Independent Counsel in 1991 before ending his cooperation and invoking his Fifth Amendment right against self-incrimination. Subsequently, a judicial order compelled Corr to testify and forced him to produce documents, under grants of immunity.

== Post civil service positions ==
Corr served as a Professor of Political Science at the University of Oklahoma from 1990 to 1996.

Between 1995 and 2001, Corr was the Director of the Energy Institute of the Americas (EIA), a multi-national non-governmental organization he founded.

Corr served as the Associate Director of the International Programs Center (IPC) of the University of Oklahoma from 1996.

== Death ==
Corr died on February 11, 2026, at the age of 91.

Diplomatic posts
Preceded by Harry W. Shlaudeman	United States Ambassador to Peru; November 6, 1980 – October 11, 1981	Succeeded by Frank V. Ortiz, Jr.
Preceded by Alexander Watson; Chargé d'Affairs ad interim	United States Ambassador to Bolivia; December 10, 1981 – August 9, 1985	Succeeded by Edward Morgan Rowell
Preceded by Thomas R. Pickering	United States Ambassador to El Salvador; August 29, 1985 – August 10, 1988	Succeeded by William G. Walker
