= J. Curtis Struble =

American diplomat (born 1953)

Ambassador James Curtis Struble
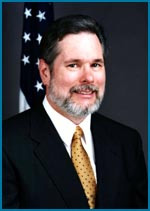

Ambassador to Peru
- In office February 4, 2004 – August 13, 2007
- Preceded by: John R. Dawson
- Succeeded by: P. Michael McKinley

Personal details
- Born: 1953 (age 72–73) Visalia, California

James Curtis Struble (born 1953) is a former United States ambassador to Peru. Struble is a member of the Senior Foreign Service with the rank of Minister Counselor. He has worked in U.S. embassies in Ecuador, Thailand, Honduras, Spain, Russia and Mexico.

== Biography ==
Struble was born in Visalia, California. He received two B.A. degrees in Russian History and in Slavic Languages and Literature from the University of California, Berkeley in 1975. Between 1988 and 1989 he was a Foreign Affairs fellow at the Hoover Institution in Stanford, California.

Between June 2001 and July 2002, Struble served as Deputy Assistant Secretary in the State Department's Bureau of Western Hemisphere Affairs. In this role Struble was responsible for providing broad policy oversight over U.S.-South American relations. Struble in his role in the State Department has been a vocal opponent of Fidel Castro's regime and has testified before the U.S. House of Representatives Subcommittee on Western Hemisphere Affairs regarding Cuba's jailing of political dissidents which the Cuban government claims were receiving U.S. financing.

On December 9, 2003, was confirmed by the United States Senate to the position of U.S. Ambassador to Peru. On January 16, 2004, was sworn in as U.S. Ambassador to Peru, and presented his credentials on February 4, 2004. On January 25, 2006, after Venezuelan President Hugo Chávez announced his support for Peruvian presidential candidate Ollanta Humala Struble was quoted as saying "[Chávez] should let presidents take care of their countries, and the best thing for the region is Chávez taking care of managing his country" and went on to reprimand Venezuela's actions in the Latin American region.

Diplomatic posts
Preceded by John R. Dawson	United States Ambassador to Peru; February 4, 2004–August 13, 2007	Succeeded by P. Michael McKinley
