= Alberto Martinez Piedra =

American diplomat (1926–2021)

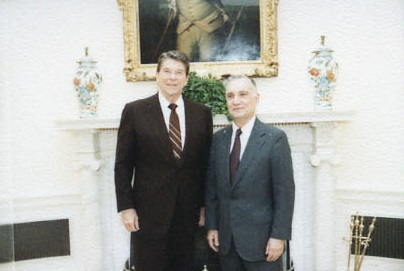
- Piedra with Ronald Reagan in 1984

United States Ambassador to Guatemala
- In office August 17, 1984 – August 22, 1987
- President: Ronald Reagan
- Preceded by: Frederic L. Chapin
- Succeeded by: James H. Michel

Personal details
- Born: January 29, 1926 Cuba
- Died: December 20, 2021 (aged 95) Bethesda, Maryland
- Party: Republican

Alberto Martinez Piedra (January 29, 1926 – December 20, 2021) was the David E. Bentley Professor of Political Economy at The Institute of World Politics.

Dr. Piedra was the Director of the Latin American Institute at The Catholic University of America from 1965 to 1982. He was the United States Ambassador to Guatemala (1984–1987).

Piedra has three doctorates - Doctor in Law, 1951, University of Havana; University of Madrid (1957), and Georgetown University (1962). He was Director General of Exports and Imports of the Cuban Ministry of Commerce in 1959; and Technical Assistant of the Department of Economic Development of the Cuban National Council from 1958 to 1959. He was a Staff Economist at the OAS from 1960 to 1962.
