= Terence Todman =

American diplomat (1926–2014)

Terence A. Todman
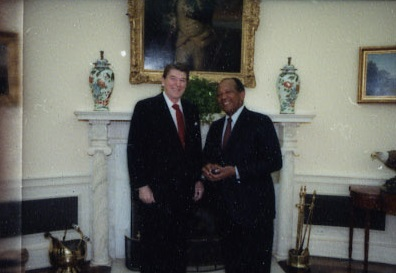
- Todman (right) next to U.S. President Ronald Reagan (left) in 1985

44th United States Ambassador to Argentina
- In office June 13, 1989 – June 28, 1993
- President: George H. W. Bush
- Preceded by: Theodore E. Gildred
- Succeeded by: James Richard Cheek

United States Ambassador to Denmark
- In office November 17, 1983 – January 8, 1989
- President: Ronald Reagan
- Preceded by: John Langeloth Loeb Jr.
- Succeeded by: Keith Lapham Brown

56th United States Ambassador to Spain
- In office July 20, 1978 – August 8, 1983
- President: Jimmy Carter
- Preceded by: Wells Stabler
- Succeeded by: Thomas Ostrom Enders

18th Assistant Secretary of State for Inter-American Affairs
- In office April 1, 1977 – June 27, 1978
- President: Jimmy Carter
- Preceded by: Harry W. Shlaudeman
- Succeeded by: Viron P. Vaky

United States Ambassador to Costa Rica
- In office March 17, 1975 – January 24, 1977
- President: Gerald Ford
- Preceded by: Viron P. Vaky
- Succeeded by: Marvin Weissman

United States Ambassador to Guinea
- In office August 26, 1972 – January 3, 1975
- President: Richard Nixon
- Preceded by: Albert W. Sherer Jr.
- Succeeded by: William Caldwell Harrop

United States Ambassador to Chad
- In office August 21, 1969 – June 29, 1972
- President: Richard Nixon
- Preceded by: Sheldon B. Vance
- Succeeded by: Edward W. Mulcahy

Personal details
- Born: March 13, 1926 St. Thomas, U.S. Virgin Islands
- Died: August 13, 2014 (aged 88) St. Thomas, U.S. Virgin Islands
- Spouse: Doris Weston
- Children: 4
- Education: Interamerican University of Puerto Rico (BS); Syracuse University (MPA)
- Profession: Career Ambassador
- Awards: Secretary of State Distinguished Service Award

Military service
- Allegiance: United States
- Branch/service: United States Army
- Years of service: 1945–1949
- Rank: First lieutenant
- Battles/wars: World War II

Terence Alphonso Todman (March 13, 1926 – August 13, 2014) was an American diplomat who served as the U.S. ambassador to Chad, Guinea, Costa Rica, Spain, Denmark, and Argentina. In 1990, he was awarded the rank of career ambassador.

== Life ==
Todman was born on Saint Thomas, U.S. Virgin Islands, on March 13, 1926. His mother worked as a house maid and laundress, and his father was a grocery clerk. His childhood in St. Thomas would prove influential in his decision to become a diplomat. He later spoke of his school years as such: "...we found ourselves doing studies on different countries, obviously at a high school level, but nevertheless you got exposed to the fact that there were other places, other people, other things happening. So, with the movement of people in and out and with that kind of intellectual academic preparation, it made for a consciousness of a world outside and of the need to deal with other people." He graduated Charlotte Amalie High School second in his class.

Todman graduated from the Interamerican University of Puerto Rico summa cum laude. He was drafted by the United States Army while in college and served in Japan from 1945 to 1949. During four years in Japan, Todman became a first lieutenant. Years later his service overseas earned him a place in the Infantry Hall of Fame at Fort Benning, Georgia. Todman earned an M.P.A. degree from the Maxwell Graduate School of Citizenship and Public Affairs at Syracuse University in 1952, the top-ranked and most prestigious graduate school of public administration. After passing the Federal Entry Exam, Todman received offers from the Office of Management and Budget, the Office of Personnel Management, the Bureau of Indian Affairs and the State Department. He joined the State Department and, the following year, passed the Foreign Service Examination.

During his Ambassadorship in Guinea, his embassy was under eavesdropping of the Soviet Union's KGB. His appointment as ambassador to Costa Rica in 1974 represented the first African American to be given the title in a Spanish-speaking country.

Todman was a member of Alpha Phi Alpha fraternity. He was also a director of Exxcel Group. The cafeteria at the Harry S Truman Building was named after Todman in 2022.

== Personal life and death ==
Todman was fluent in Spanish, French, Arabic, Hindi, and Japanese. He married Doris Weston; they had four children. On August 13, 2014, Todman died at the age of 88, at the Roy L. Schneider Hospital in Saint Thomas.

Diplomatic posts
Preceded by Sheldon B. Vance	United States Ambassador to Chad; 1969–1972	Succeeded by Edward W. Mulcahy
Preceded by Albert W. Sherer Jr.	United States Ambassador to Guinea; 1972–1975	Succeeded by William Caldwell Harrop
Preceded by Viron P. Vaky	United States Ambassador to Costa Rica; 1975–1977	Succeeded by Marvin Weissman
Preceded by Wells Stabler	United States Ambassador to Spain; 1978–1983	Succeeded by Thomas Ostrom Enders
Preceded by John Langeloth Loeb Jr.	United States Ambassador to Denmark; 1983–1989	Succeeded by Keith Lapham Brown
Preceded by Theodore E. Gildred	United States Ambassador to Argentina; 1989–1993	Succeeded by James Richard Cheek
Government offices
Preceded by Harry W. Shlaudeman	Assistant Secretary of State for Inter-American Affairs; April 1, 1977 – June 27, 1978	Succeeded by Viron P. Vaky
