= Bernie Navarro =

Cuban-born American businessman and ambassador to Peru

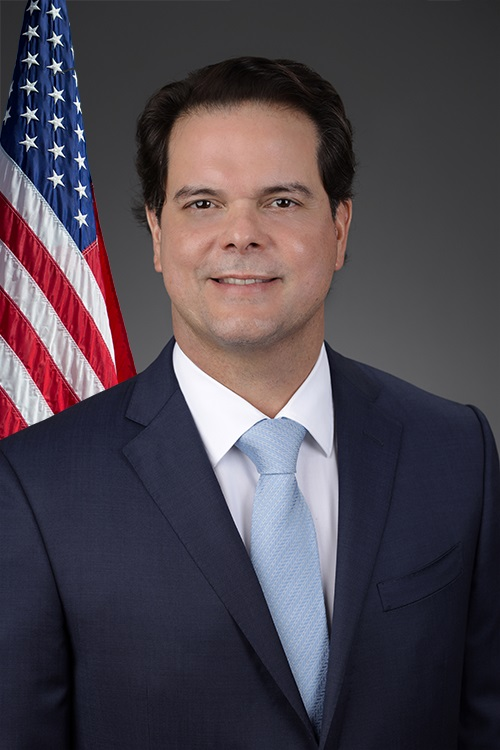
- Official portrait, 2026

United States Ambassador to Peru
- Incumbent
- Assumed office February 3, 2026
- President: Donald Trump
- Preceded by: Stephanie Syptak-Ramnath

Personal details
- Born: Bernardo Navarro Miami, Florida, U.S.
- Education: University of Miami (BBA); Harvard University (ALM)

Bernardo Navarro is a Cuban-born American businessman who has served as the United States Ambassador to Peru. He was previously Chairman of the Board of Trustees of Miami Dade College.

== Early life ==
Navarro was born and raised in Miami to Cuban immigrant parents. He earned a Bachelors of Business Administration in international business and finance from the University of Miami and a Masters of Liberal Arts from Harvard studying Government.

== Career ==
Navarro is the founder and president of Benworth Capital Partners, a private equity and mortgage lending firm based in Florida and in his current residence of Puerto Rico. The firm has faced legal action by the Federal Reserve Bank of San Francisco, which he settled. He also worked as President of the Latin Builders Association, a labor union, where he spearheaded the creation of the LBA Construction and Business Administration Academy. He served on the Board of Trustees of the Miami Dade College, including two years as President of the Board. The Miami Herald called him a "close ally" of Marco Rubio.

== Ambassadorship ==
President Donald Trump announced his nomination to be the United States Ambassador to Peru on May 22, 2025. He was confirmed by the Senate on December 18. He presented his credentials to president José Jerí on February 3, 2026.

== Controversies ==
=== Lawsuit Filed by the Federal Reserve Bank of San Francisco ===
In 2024, the Federal Reserve Bank of San Francisco sued Navarro, his wife, and Benworth Capital for an alleged breach of a contract under the Paycheck Protection Program (PPP), for which the bank demanded the return of $67 million. According to the complaint, during the COVID-19 pandemic, Navarro administered $4 billion in forgivable loans intended to sustain businesses during the crisis. However, the operation netted Benworth Capital more than $680 million in commissions, a portion of which was diverted directly to Navarro. According to court documents, between 2021 and 2024, Navarro transferred more than $50 million in dividends to a Benworth subsidiary in Puerto Rico in order to avoid making payments. In September 2025, Navarro reached a settlement with the bank to resolve the lawsuit.

=== Chifagate ===
Amid the scandal known as “chifagate,” which involved President José Jerí in alleged illicit dealings with Chinese businessman Zhi Huayang after he was spotted at one of Huayang’s chifas, Navarro posted a photo of himself eating a hamburger with Jerí, accompanied by the caption: “Changing the menu. Sharing an American hamburger with the President of Peru,” which was interpreted as a veiled reference to the scandal.

=== Threat of Retaliation Against Peru ===
On April 17, 2026, after President José María Balcázar declared that he would leave the decision on the purchase of aircraft to the next president, Navarro posted a warning on X stating: “If you negotiate in bad faith with the U.S. and undermine American interests, rest assured that as a representative of the Trump Administration, I will use every tool at my disposal to protect and promote the prosperity and security of our country and the region.” These statements were interpreted as a threat against Peru. Following this, President Balcázar criticized Navarro and proposed discussing the matter directly with Trump.

In October 2026, Navarro stated that the embassy would take action against Peruvian judges who attempted to “undermine” U.S. economic interests, noting that the embassy had denied one such judge entry into U.S. territory. He also noted that there are “opinion makers” and “internationalists” who, in order to oppose the U.S., are “willing to trample on Peruvian laws” to benefit their economic rival, China.
