= Viron P. Vaky =

American diplomat (1925–2012)

Viron Peter Vaky

United States Ambassador to Costa Rica
- In office October 17, 1972 – February 9, 1974
- President: Richard Nixon
- Preceded by: Walter Christian Ploeser
- Succeeded by: Terence Todman

United States Ambassador to Colombia
- In office April 5, 1974 – June 23, 1976
- President: Richard Nixon
- Preceded by: Leonard J. Saccio
- Succeeded by: Phillip Victor Sanchez

United States Ambassador to Venezuela
- In office July 26, 1976 – June 24, 1978
- President: Gerald Ford
- Preceded by: Harry Walter Shlaudeman
- Succeeded by: William H. Luers

19th Assistant Secretary of State for Inter-American Affairs
- In office July 21, 1978 – November 30, 1979
- President: Jimmy Carter
- Preceded by: Terence Todman
- Succeeded by: William G. Bowdler

Personal details
- Born: September 13, 1925 Corpus Christi, Texas, U.S.
- Died: November 22, 2012 (aged 87) Mitchellville, Maryland, U.S.

Viron Peter Vaky (September 13, 1925 – November 22, 2012) was an American diplomat who was United States Ambassador to Costa Rica (1972–74), Colombia (1974–76), and Venezuela (1976). He was a member of the American Academy of Diplomacy and Council on Foreign Relations.

== Life ==
=== Career ===
Viron P. Vaky was born in Corpus Christi, Texas, on September 13, 1925, as a son of Greek immigrants. During the Second World War, he was part of the Army Signal Corps, while graduating from the Georgetown School of Foreign Service in 1947. One year later, he obtained an MA in international relations from the University of Chicago. In 1949, Vaky joined the Foreign Service and went on to serve as career diplomat until 1980, when he retired from the State Department. Following this, he taught at the Georgetown School of Foreign Service, ultimately becoming an associate dean.

=== Opposition to overthrow of Allende ===
Documents declassified and made available in 2013 show that in September 1970, when Vaky was the top deputy to Henry Kissinger, Vaky took a stand against Kissinger's plan to overthrow Salvador Allende who was the democratically elected president of Chile. According to the account published on the National Security Archive, Vaky wrote a memo to Kissinger arguing that plotting a coup would lead to "widespread violence and even insurrection." He also argued that such a policy was immoral: "What we propose is patently a violation of our own principles and policy tenets.... If these principles have any meaning, we normally depart from them only to meet the gravest threat to us, e.g. to our survival. Is Allende a mortal threat to the U.S.? It is hard to argue this."

=== Embezzlement accusations against Debayle ===
Following the 1972 Nicaragua earthquake Vaky accused then Army Chief Anastasio Somoza Debayle of exploiting international aid for personal gain. Debayle denied these accusations and was later validated when Terence Todman, Secretary of State for Inter-American affairs testified that 28 major audits failed to demonstrate any diversion or misuse of resources.

== Family ==
He had three sons, including Paul Vaky who became regional director for Central and Eastern Europe for the Office of Overseas Prosecutorial Development Assistance and Training (OPDAT) in the United States Department of Justice.

== Positions ==
- US Assistant Secretary of State for Western Hemisphere Affairs (1978–79)
- US Ambassador to Venezuela (1976)
- US Ambassador to Colombia (1974–76)
- US Ambassador to Costa Rica (1972–74)
- US National Security Council (1969–70)
- American Academy of Diplomacy
- Carnegie Endowment for International Peace
- Council on Foreign Relations
- Inter-American Dialogue

Diplomatic posts
Preceded by Walter C. Ploeser	United States Ambassador to Costa Rica; October 17, 1972 – February 9, 1974	Succeeded by Terence A. Todman
Preceded by Leonard J. Saccio	United States Ambassador to Colombia; April 5, 1974 – June 23, 1976	Succeeded by Phillip V. Sanchez
Preceded by Harry W. Shlaudeman	United States Ambassador to Venezuela; July 26, 1976 – June 24, 1978	Succeeded by William H. Luers
Government offices
Preceded by Terence Todman	Assistant Secretary of State for Inter-American Affairs; July 21, 1978 – November 30, 1979	Succeeded by William G. Bowdler
