= Stephanie Syptak-Ramnath =

American diplomat

Ambassador (retired)

Ambassador of the United States to Peru
- In office June 20, 2024 – April 18, 2025
- President: Joe Biden
- Preceded by: Lisa D. Kenna
- Succeeded by: Bernardo Navarro

Personal details
- Born: Stephanie Faye Syptak
- Spouse: Gautam Ramnath
- Children: 2 daughters
- Education: Georgetown University School of Foreign Service

Military service
- Allegiance: United States
- Branch/service: United States Navy

Stephanie Syptak-Ramnath is a retired American diplomat whose last assignment was as the civilian deputy to the commander and senior foreign policy advisor at U.S. Southern Command in Miami, Florida from June 2025 to July 2026. She served as the United States ambassador to Peru from June 2024 to April 2025. Other leadership positions include deputy chief of mission at the U.S. Embassy in Mexico City, Mexico from July 2021 to July 2023 and deputy executive secretary to Secretary of State Pompeo and Secretary of State Blinken from August 2019 to July 2021. She was awarded the Presidential Rank Award in 2021.

== Early life and education ==
Syptak-Ramnath is a graduate from the Georgetown University's Walsh School of Foreign Service.

== Career ==
Syptak-Ramnath served as Chargé d’Affaires ad interim at the U.S. Embassy Singapore from January 2017 to July 2019, directing 19 U.S. government sections and agencies in the advancement of bilateral security, military, economic, and people-to-people cooperation. During that time, she led embassy efforts in support of the historic June 2018 Singapore Summit between United States President Donald Trump and North Korean leader Kim Jong-un.

Syptak-Ramnath previously served as minister counselor for public diplomacy at the U.S. Embassy Mexico City, as deputy chief of mission in Bamako, Mali, and senior deputy director in the Office of Public Diplomacy in the Bureau of European and Eurasian Affairs. Other assignments include Tunis, Tunisia, the U.S. Mission to the United Nations, and Monterrey, Mexico. In November 2015, she was awarded the Department of State’s Edward R. Murrow Award for Excellence in Public Diplomacy.

Prior to joining the Senior Foreign Service, she was an officer in the United States Navy. She was a member of the International Women’s Forum Leadership Foundation 2011-2012 Fellows Class, of which she completed executive programs at Harvard Business School and INSEAD.

=== Ambassador to Peru ===
In January 2023, President Joe Biden nominated Syptak-Ramnath as ambassador to Peru. Hearings on her nomination were held before the Senate Foreign Relations Committee on May 4, 2023. The committee favorably reported her nomination on June 1, 2023, and she was confirmed by Voice Vote before the Senate on May 2, 2024. She presented her credentials to President Dina Boluarte on June 20, 2024.

In a formal ceremony held in the Castilla Hall of the Legislative Palace on April 16, 2025, the President of Peru’s Congress, Eduardo Salhuana, presented the Congressional Medal of Honor, Grand Officer grade, to Ambassador Syptak-Ramnath in recognition of her contributions to strengthening the ties of friendship and cooperation between both countries.

She left her position as U.S. Ambassador to Peru on April 18, 2025.

== Personal life ==
Syptak-Ramnath is married to Gautam Ramnath and have two daughters. She speaks Spanish and French.
