= Wells Stabler =

American diplomat (1919–2009)

55th United States Ambassador to Spain
- In office March 13, 1975 – May 4, 1978
- President: Jimmy Carter
- Preceded by: Horacio Rivero Jr.
- Succeeded by: Terence A. Todman

Personal details
- Born: October 31, 1919 Boston, Massachusetts, U.S.
- Died: November 13, 2009 (aged 90)
- Education: Harvard University

Wells Stabler (October 31, 1919 – November 13, 2009) was an American Career Foreign Service Officer who served as Chargé d'Affaires ad interim to Jordan (February 18, 1949 - February 1950) and Ambassador Extraordinary and Plenipotentiary to Spain (1975-1978). It was during his tenure in Spain that Francisco Franco died and Spain transitioned to a constitutional democracy.

Stabler was born in Boston, Massachusetts, on October 31, 1919. After graduating from Harvard, he entered the State Department in the early 1940s. When the United States recognized Israel, Stabler became Vice Consul in Jerusalem. He died in Washington, D.C., on November 13, 2009, at the age of 90.
