= Shirley Abbott (ambassador) =

American diplomat and businessman

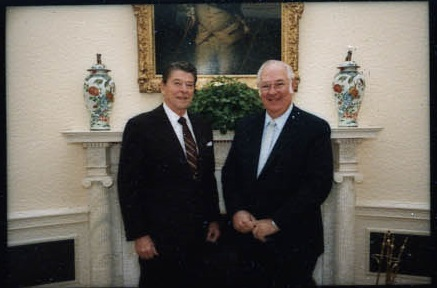
- 1984
- Born: July 23, 1924; Fairview, Oklahoma, US
- Died: April 23, 2013 (aged 88); Coronado, California, US
- Education: Pacific University
- Occupation: Optometrist
- Political party: Republican

Shirley Levoy "S.L." Abbott (July 23, 1924 – April 23, 2013) was an American businessman, rancher, politician, and ambassador.

Born in Fairview, Oklahoma, Abbott lived on a dairy farm in Minnesota with his family and then moved to El Paso, Texas. He served in the United States Army during World War II. He received his bachelor and optometrist degrees from Pacific University. He then practiced optometry in El Paso and was a rancher. He served in the Texas House of Representatives as a Republican 1977–1978. Abbott had asked the Reagan administration to appoint him as United States Ambassador to Belize. Instead, the administration tried to nominate him as United States Ambassador to Guyana, but the nomination was withdrawn. Finally, in 1983, Abbott was appointed United States Ambassador to Lesotho by President Ronald Reagan. Abbott died from complications of congestive heart failure in Coronado, California at age 88.

== Notes ==
Party political offices
Preceded by John Bennett	Republican nominee for Texas Comptroller of Public Accounts; 1970	Vacant Title next held by Mike Richards
Diplomatic posts
Preceded by Keith Lapham Brown	United States Ambassador to Lesotho; 1984–1989	Succeeded by Robert M. Smalley
