= Brian A. Nichols =

American diplomat (born 1965)

Brian Nichols
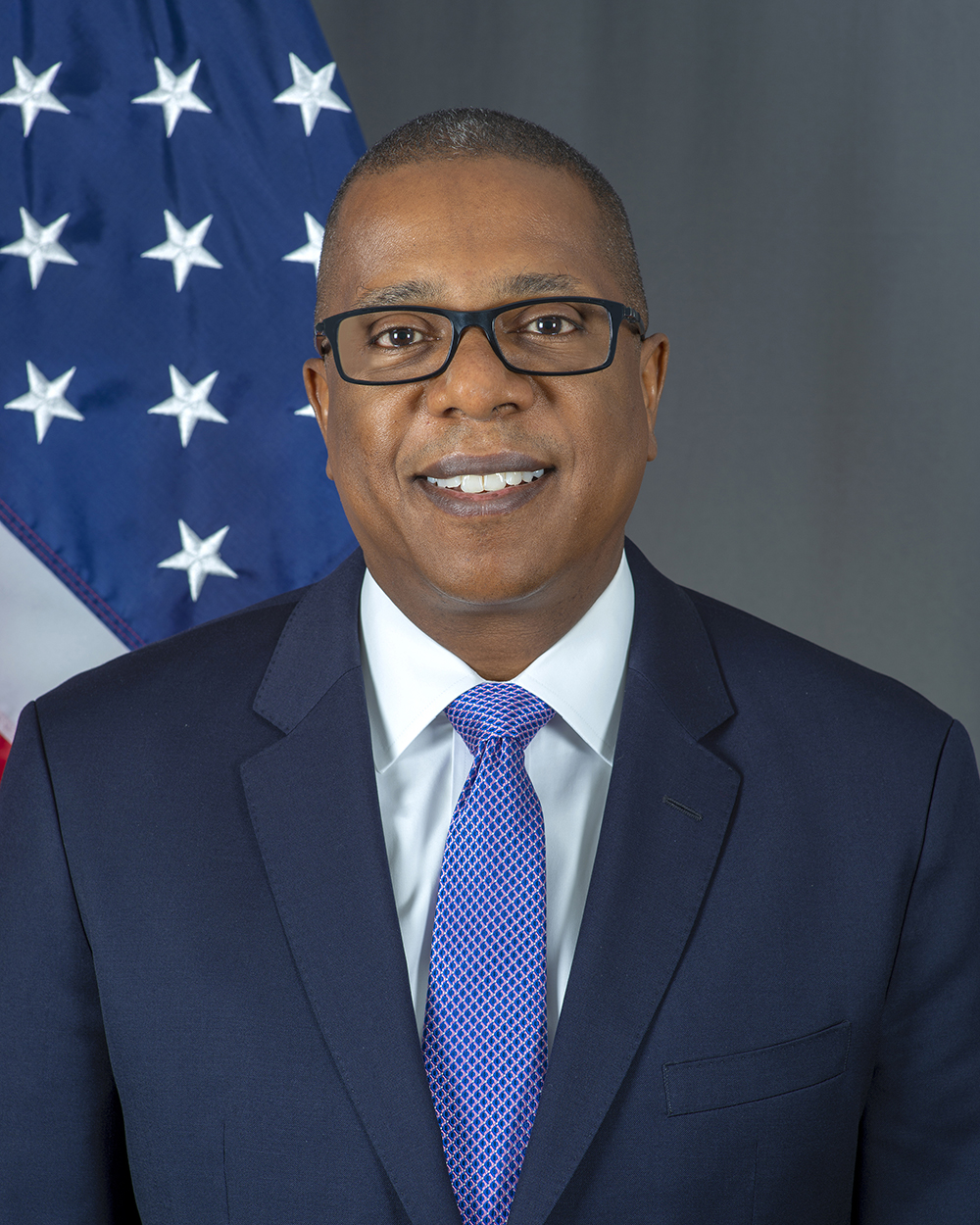

Assistant Secretary of State for Western Hemisphere Affairs
- In office September 15, 2021 – December 31, 2024
- President: Joe Biden
- Preceded by: Kimberly Breier
- Succeeded by: Juan Pablo Segura

United States Ambassador to Zimbabwe
- In office July 19, 2018 – September 14, 2021
- President: Donald Trump; Joe Biden
- Preceded by: Harry K. Thomas Jr.
- Succeeded by: Pamela Tremont (2024)

United States Ambassador to Peru
- In office July 3, 2014 – October 13, 2017
- President: Barack Obama; Donald Trump
- Preceded by: Rose Likins
- Succeeded by: Krishna Urs

Personal details
- Born: 1965 (age 60–61)
- Education: Tufts University (BA)

Brian Andrew Nichols (born 1965 in Providence, Rhode Island) is an American diplomat who served as Assistant Secretary of State for Western Hemisphere Affairs until his retirement in January 2025. He previously served as the United States Ambassador to Peru from 2014 until 2017, as well as the U.S. Ambassador to Zimbabwe from 2018 until 2021.

== Ambassadorships ==
During his time at the State Department, Nichols had served as ambassadors to several countries.

=== Ambassador to Peru ===
Nichols served as the United States Ambassador to Peru from 2014 until 2017, when he was succeeded by Krishna Urs.

=== Ambassador to Zimbabwe ===
In June 2018, he was nominated to be the next U.S. Ambassador to Zimbabwe by President Donald Trump. On June 28, 2018, his nomination was confirmed in the Senate by voice vote. On July 19, 2018, Nichols presented his credentials to President Emmerson Mnangagwa.

During the George Floyd protests in the United States, Nichols was summoned by the government of Zimbabwe after U.S. Secretary Advisor Robert C. O'Brien labeled Zimbabwe as a "foreign adversary" that was fomenting the protests and threatened with retaliatory action.

In late July 2020, he was threatened with expulsion from the country and called a "thug" by the ruling party after accusations that he was helping organizers of an anti-government march against President Emmerson Mnangagwa.

=== Biden administration ===
On March 26, 2021, President Joe Biden announced his intent to nominate Nichols to serve as Assistant Secretary of State for Western Hemisphere Affairs. On September 13, 2021, his nomination was confirmed in the Senate by voice vote.

On 28 February 2023, Nichols urged Peru’s Congress to expedite early elections and Peru’s president to promptly end the country's political crisis, leading to criticism in Peru and from Mexican President Andrés Manuel López Obrador.

Nichols retired from the Foreign Service on December 31, 2024, after 36 years of service.

== Honors ==
- Knight Grand Cross of the Order of the Sun of Peru
- Two Presidential Meritorious Service Awards
- 2016 Charles E. Cobb, Jr. Award for Initiative and Success in Trade Development

== Personal life ==
Nichols and his wife, Geraldine Kam, have two daughters. He speaks Spanish.

== See also ==
- List of current ambassadors of the United States

Diplomatic posts
Preceded by Rose Likins	United States Ambassador to Peru; 2014–2017	Succeeded by Krishna Urs
Preceded by Harry Thomas	United States Ambassador to Zimbabwe; 2018–2021	Succeeded by Pamela Tremont
