= John Randle Hamilton =

American diplomat (born 1944)

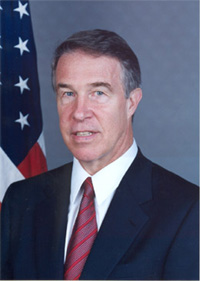

United States Ambassador to Guatemala
- In office 2003–2005
- President: George W. Bush
- Preceded by: Prudence Bushnell
- Succeeded by: James M. Derham

United States Ambassador to Peru
- In office 1999–2002
- President: Bill Clinton; George W. Bush
- Preceded by: Dennis Jett
- Succeeded by: John R. Dawson

Principal Deputy Assistant Secretary for Western Hemisphere Affairs
- In office 1998–1999
- President: Bill Clinton

Deputy Assistant Secretary for Central America, the Caribbean, and Cuba
- In office 1996–1998
- President: Bill Clinton

Director of the Office of Central American and Panamanian Affairs
- In office 1992–1996
- President: George H. W. Bush; Bill Clinton

Political counselor in Lima, Peru
- In office 1986–1989

Political counselor in San José, Costa Rica
- In office 1989–1992

Personal details
- Born: 1944 (age 81–82)
- Education: M.A. in Latin American Studies from Stanford University (1982)
- Alma mater: University of North Carolina at Chapel Hill (1967)

Military service
- Allegiance: United States
- Years of service: 1968–1970
- Unit: U.S. Naval Reserve

John Randle Hamilton (born 1944) is an American diplomat. He served as United States Ambassador to Peru from 1999 to 2002, and as United States Ambassador to Guatemala from 2003 to 2005.

== Early life and education ==
He graduated from the University of North Carolina at Chapel Hill in 1967, and received an M.A. in Latin American Studies from Stanford University in 1982. From 1968 to 1970, he served in the U.S. Naval Reserve.

== Career ==
He served as political counselor in Lima, Peru from 1986 to 1989 and in San José, Costa Rica from 1989 to 1992. He served as the Director of the Office of Central American and Panamanian Affairs from 1992 to 1996, Deputy Assistant Secretary for Central America, the Caribbean and Cuba from 1996 to 1998, and Principal Deputy Assistant Secretary for Western Hemisphere Affairs from 1998 to 1999. He then served as U.S. Ambassador to Peru from 1999 to 2002, and to Guatemala from 2003 to 2005.

== Personal life ==
He is married to Donna, and they have two daughters, Kathryn and Erin.

Diplomatic posts
Preceded by Dennis Jett	United States Ambassador to Peru; 1999–2002	Succeeded by John R. Dawson
Preceded by Prudence Bushnell	United States Ambassador to Guatemala; 2003–2005	Succeeded by James M. Derham
