= Lisa D. Kenna =

American diplomat (born 1965)

Lisa Kenna
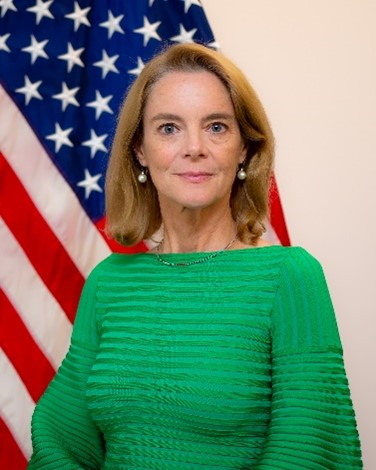
- Official portrait, 2023

Acting Under Secretary of State for Political Affairs
- In office January 20, 2025 – June 5, 2025
- President: Donald Trump
- Preceded by: John R. Bass (acting)
- Succeeded by: Allison Hooker

26th and 29th Executive Secretary of the United States Department of State
- Incumbent
- Assumed office January 20, 2025
- President: Donald Trump
- Preceded by: Dereck J. Hogan
- In office June 15, 2017 – November 18, 2020
- President: Donald Trump
- Preceded by: Joseph Macmanus
- Succeeded by: Kamala S. Lakhdhir

Acting United States Secretary of State
- In office January 20, 2025 – January 21, 2025
- President: Donald Trump
- Preceded by: John R. Bass (acting)
- Succeeded by: Marco Rubio

Acting Assistant Secretary of State for Intelligence and Research
- In office July 5, 2024 – January 20, 2025
- President: Joe Biden
- Preceded by: Brett Holmgren
- Succeeded by: Leila Gardner (acting)

United States Ambassador to Peru
- In office March 22, 2021 – September 8, 2023
- President: Joe Biden
- Preceded by: Krishna Urs
- Succeeded by: Stephanie Syptak-Ramnath

Personal details
- Born: Lisa Dougherty; August 19, 1965 (age 61) Peoria, Illinois, U.S.
- Party: Independent
- Education: Middlebury College (BA); University of Connecticut, Hartford (JD)

Lisa S. Dougherty Kenna (née Dougherty; born August 19, 1965) is an American diplomat who has served as Executive Secretary of the United States Department of State since January 2025. She served as Principal Deputy Assistant Secretary for the Bureau of Intelligence and Research from September 11, 2023, to January 20, 2025. She had served as the United States ambassador to Peru from March 2021 to September 2023. She served as Acting Secretary of State for only a day, as Senator Marco Rubio was confirmed by the Senate on the day of her appointment, and was later sworn in on January 21, 2025.

== Early life and education ==
Kenna is the daughter of Air Force Colonel Andrew Joseph Dougherty and Marjorie Marie (Schrader) Dougherty. Kenna studied at Middlebury College and the University of Connecticut School of Law. She worked as an attorney in private practice before joining the Central Intelligence Agency. She spent nine years with the CIA and then joined the Foreign Service.

== Career ==
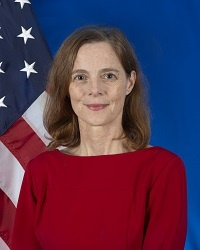
Lisa D. Kenna in 2017

She served as the executive secretary of the United States Department of State beginning in 2017, succeeding Joseph E. Macmanus, during Donald Trump's first term.

On October 1, 2019, a Freedom of Information Act lawsuit was issued by American Oversight, an American activist group, against the U.S. Department of State, requesting communications of a list of several officials including Kenna in connection to the Trump–Ukraine scandal. In the same week, text messages were released, including a single text where Ambassador to the European Union Gordon Sondland redirected Acting Ambassador to Ukraine Bill Taylor to Kenna over concerns that Taylor held.

On May 1, 2020, President Trump announced his intent to nominate Kenna to be the next United States Ambassador to the Republic of Peru. On May 6, 2020, her nomination was sent to the Senate. On July 23, 2020, a hearing on her nomination was held before the Senate Foreign Relations Committee. On November 18, 2020, her nomination was confirmed in the United States Senate by voice vote. Lisa Kenna presented her credentials to the President Francisco Sagasti on March 22, 2021 On September 8, 2023, she was succeeded in the role by ad interim Chargé d'Affaires John T. McNamara.

On January 20, 2025, President Trump, newly inaugurated for his second term, appointed Kenna to serve as Acting Secretary of State for an interim basis until the U.S. Senate voted to confirm President Trump's nominee, Senator Marco Rubio. Kenna only served less than 24 hours in her role as the Senate voted to confirm Senator Rubio to the position later that same evening, and was sworn in as Secretary of State the next day.

== Personal life ==
Lisa Kenna was married to Roger T. Kenna. She speaks Arabic, Persian and Urdu.

Diplomatic posts
Preceded by Krishna Urs	United States Ambassador to Peru; 2021–2023	Succeeded by Stephanie Syptak-Ramnath
Political offices
Preceded by John R. Bass; Acting	United States Secretary of State; Acting; 2025	Succeeded by Marco Rubio
Preceded by John R. Bass; Acting	Under Secretary of State for Political Affairs; Acting; 2025	Succeeded by Allison Hooker
