= Kevin Whitaker =

United States career diplomat

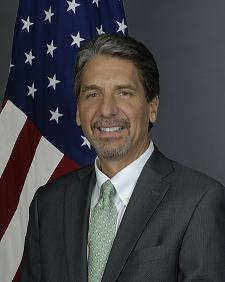

United States Ambassador to Colombia
- In office May 20, 2014 – August 17, 2019
- President: Barack Obama; Donald Trump
- Preceded by: Michael McKinley
- Succeeded by: Philip Goldberg

Personal details
- Born: April 28, 1957 (age 69) Fort Campbell North, Kentucky, U.S.
- Education: University of Virginia

Kevin Whitaker (born April 28, 1957) is an American diplomat who is a former United States Ambassador to Colombia. He was confirmed by the United States Senate on April 1, 2014, and sworn in on April 28, 2014.

== Career ==
Kevin Whitaker was a career member of the Senior Foreign Service of the United States. Prior to his appointment as Ambassador to Colombia, he was Deputy Assistant Secretary of State for South America in the Bureau of Western Hemisphere Affairs.

Whitaker has served in the United Kingdom, Jamaica, Honduras, Nicaragua, and Venezuela, where he was Deputy Chief of Mission (2005–07). In addition, he previously served in a number of positions at the Department of State, including as coordinator of the Office of Cuban Affairs (2002–05), Deputy Executive Secretary (2007–08), and director of the office of Andean affairs (2008–11).

During his Senate confirmation hearing for the post of ambassador to Colombia, Whitaker commented on the effects of the sack of Bogotá mayor Gustavo Petro on the peace process between the Colombian government and FARC. Colombian lawmakers criticized Whitaker's comments as an intervention in Colombian internal affairs.

In May 2014 Venezuelan officials claimed that Whitaker was personally involved in a U.S. attempt to destabilize the leftist government of President Nicolás Maduro. The Venezuelan government, which blamed the U.S. for protests in Venezuela, cited supposed emails from opposition lawmaker María Corina Machado stating that Whitaker had offered his support to the opposition. Maduro's government gave no information on how it acquired apparently private emails, and offered no evidence to support the authenticity of the emails. In a statement, the State Department called the accusations "baseless and false" and said: "We've seen many times that the Venezuelan government tries to distract from its own actions by blaming the United States." An expert in cybersecurity forensics said the emails used by the Venezuelan government to accuse the opposition of a plot were fake.

== Personal ==
Whitaker was born in Ft. Campbell, Kentucky. He attended Robinson Secondary School in Fairfax, Virginia from 9th - 11th grades and is a graduate of Merritt Island High School, in Merritt Island, Florida. He received his degree in history from the University of Virginia in 1979.

Diplomatic posts
Preceded by Michael McKinley	United States Ambassador to Colombia; 2014–2019	Succeeded by Philip Goldberg
