= Arnold Aronson =

American civil rights leader (1911–1998)

Arnold Aronson (March 11, 1911 – February 17, 1998) was a founder of the Leadership Conference on Civil Rights and served as its executive secretary from 1950 to 1980. In 1941 he worked with A. Philip Randolph to pressure President Franklin D. Roosevelt to issue Executive Order 8802, opening jobs in the federal bureaucracy and in the defense industries to minorities. A close associate of Randolph and Roy Wilkins, Aronson played an important role planning the 1963 March on Washington for Jobs and Justice. He was awarded the Presidential Medal of Freedom in 1998.

== Early life and education ==
Aronson was born in Boston in 1911. He received a B.A. degree from Harvard in 1933 and an M.S.W. from the University of Chicago.

Aronson was Jewish.

== Career in civil rights ==
In 1945 he became executive director of the National Community Relations Advisory Council, now known as the Jewish Council for Public Affairs, a position he retained until 1976. With Randolph and Wilkins, Aronson was a founder of the Leadership Conference on Civil Rights in 1950. As secretary of the Leadership Conference, he helped coordinate lobbying efforts for the Civil Rights Act of 1957, the Civil Rights Act of 1964, the Voting Rights Act of 1965, and the Fair Housing Act of 1968. Although one of the few white leaders involved in planning the 1963 March on Washington, Aronson downplayed his participation. After he retired, he founded The Leadership Conference Education Fund and served as its director until his death.

President Bill Clinton awarded him the Presidential Medal of Freedom on January 15, 1998.

He and his wife Annette had two sons, Simon Aronson of Chicago and Bernard Aronson of Takoma Park, Maryland. His nephew, singer-songwriter and organizer Si Kahn, credits his uncle with helping inspire and shape his own work.
