= James M. Derham =

American diplomat (1947–2022)

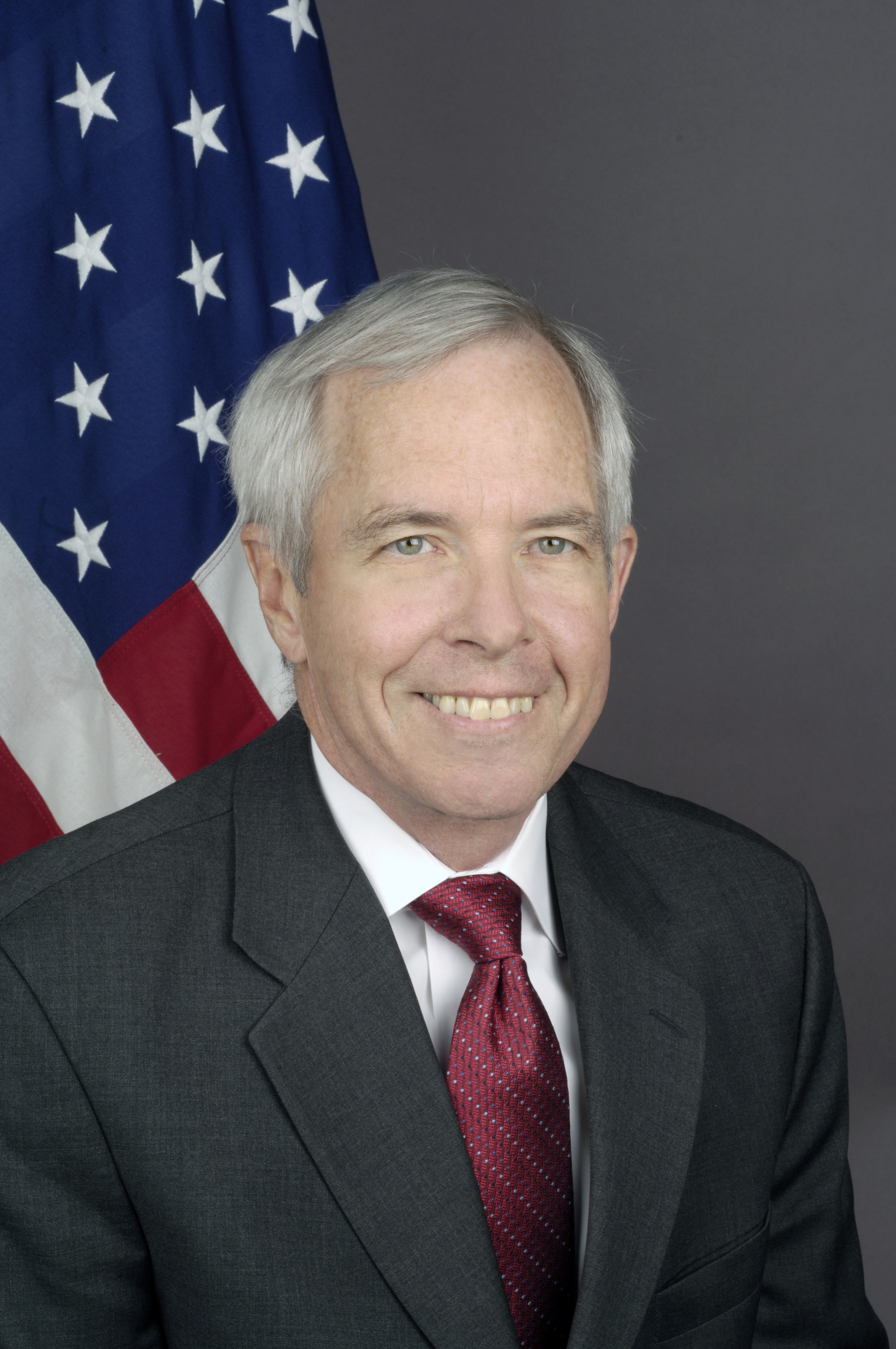
James M. Derham

James Michael Derham (1947 – October 12, 2022) was an American diplomat. He served as United States Ambassador to Guatemala from 2005 to 2008.

== Biography ==
=== Early life ===
He graduated from Fordham University and received M.A.s from the John F. Kennedy School of Government at Harvard University and George Washington University.

=== Career ===
He served as Principal Deputy Assistant Secretary of State for Western Hemisphere Affairs, Deputy Chief of Mission at the U.S. Embassy in Mexico City, Chargé d'Affaires and Deputy Chief of Mission at the U.S. Embassy in Brasília, and Consul General in Rio de Janeiro. He also served in diplomatic positions in Havana, Ciudad Juarez, and São Paulo. From September 2005 to April 2008, he served as U.S. Ambassador to Guatemala. In 2010, he served as Deputy Chief of Mission in Lisbon. He also worked as Chief of Party for a USAID project in Pristina, Kosovo, and on Capitol Hill.

From October 2011 to April 2013, he served as Chargé d'Affaires to Venezuela.

=== Personal life ===
He was married to Joleen A. Schweitzer, and they have two sons, Michael T. Derham and Christopher D. Derham. In 2010, they bought a house in Williamsburg, Virginia. Derham died at age 74 on October 12, 2022.

Diplomatic posts
Preceded by John Randle Hamilton	United States Ambassador to Guatemala; 2005-2008	Succeeded by Stephen G. McFarland
