= Richard Huntington Melton =

American diplomat (born 1935)

Richard Huntington Melton (born 1935) is an American former diplomat who was a career foreign service officer, serving as the U.S. ambassador extraordinary and plenipotentiary to Nicaragua (April 1988 until July 1988, departure requested by the government of Nicaragua July 11, 1988) and ambassador extraordinary and plenipotentiary to Brazil (1989–1993).

== Tenure in Nicaragua ==
Within hours of his arrival in Managua, the state-run radio station accused Meldon of being a CIA agent.

Miguel d'Escoto Brockmann, the Nicaraguan Foreign Minister, claimed, "the Embassy had been interfering in Nicaraguan affairs by encouraging protests by anti-Government groups." In a letter to Secretary of State George P. Shultz, Brockmann wrote, "Melton represented 'the Reagan Government's total disregard of the most elemental norms of international coexistence.'"

Ronald Reagan ordered Melton and eight others to leave the Embassy "for abusing their privileges of residence." The embassy remained open with Ronald D. Godard as Chargé d'Affaires ad interim.
