= David C. Jordan =

American diplomat

David Crichton Jordan
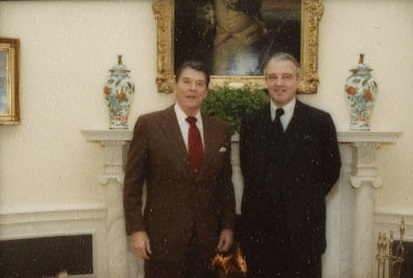
- David C. Jordan in 1984
- Born: April 30, 1935; Chicago, Illinois
- Died: July 5, 2026 (aged 91); Charlottesville, Virginia
- Education: Harvard University (A.B.); University of Virginia (LL.B.); University of Pennsylvania (Ph.D.)
- Children: 3

David C. Jordan was the United States Ambassador to Peru from March 20, 1984, to July 17, 1986.

== Life and Career ==
Following an initial academic appointment at Pennsylvania State University (1964-1965), Jordan joined the University of Virginia faculty in 1965. Four years later, he became the youngest chair of the Woodrow Wilson Department of Government and Foreign Affairs in the university's history, serving in that role from 1969 to 1977. A scholar of Latin American history, U.S. foreign policy, and political theory, Jordan wrote a variety of books and monographs, including Nationalism in Contemporary Latin America (1966, with Arthur P. Whitaker), World Politics in Our Time (1970), Spain, the Monarchy and the Atlantic Community (1979), Revolutionary Cuba and the End of the Cold War (1993), and Drug Politics: Dirty Money and Democracies (1999). In 1980, Jordan was one of the five members of the "Committee of Santa Fe" whose report "A New Inter-American Policy for the Eighties" strongly influenced the Reagan administration's Latin America foreign policy.

Jordan was nominated by Ronald Reagan to serve as U.S. ambassador to Peru in December 1983. Following Senate confirmation, he was sworn in as ambassador on March 8, 1984 and served in post from March 20, 1984, to July 17, 1986. Upon completing his ambassadorial service, Jordan returned to the faculty at the University of Virginia, where he continued to teach comparative government and international relations until his retirement in 2012. Jordan died on July 5, 2026 at the age of 91.

Diplomatic posts
Preceded by Frank Vincent Ortiz Jr.	United States Ambassador to Peru; March 20, 1984 to July 17, 1986	Succeeded by Alexander Watson
