= USS Noble (APA-218) =

US Navy Haskel-class transport ship

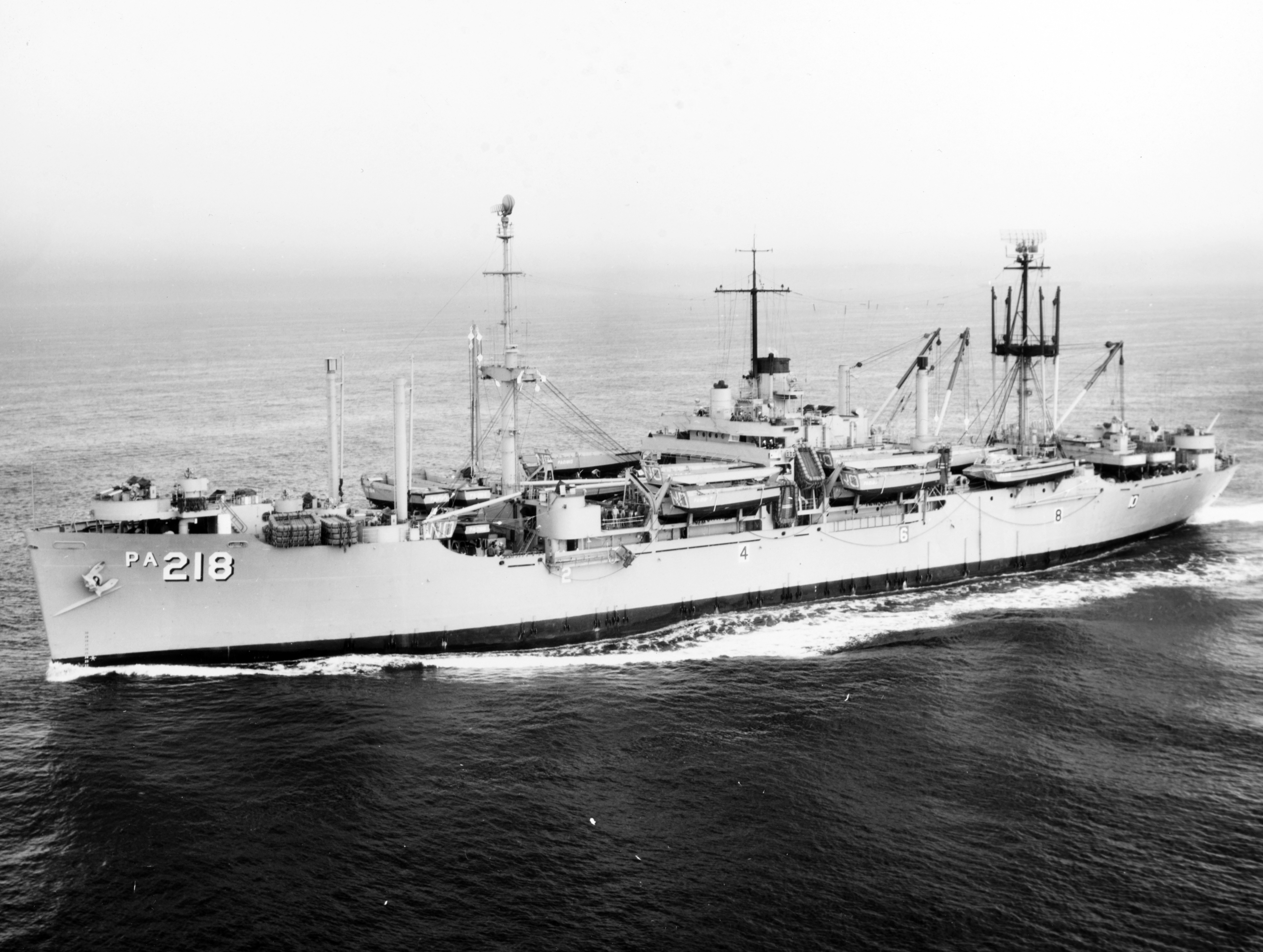
- USS Noble (APA-218), underway off San Diego, December 1956

History

United States
- Name: Noble
- Namesake: Noble County, Indiana, Noble County, Ohio, and; Noble County, Oklahoma
- Ordered: as a Type VC2-S-AP5 hull, MCE hull 566
- Builder: Permanente Metals Corporation, Richmond, California
- Yard number: 566
- Laid down: 20 July 1944
- Launched: 18 October 1944
- Sponsored by: Mrs Maxine C. Jones
- Commissioned: 27 November 1944
- Decommissioned: 1 July 1964
- Stricken: 1964
- Identification: Hull symbol: APA-218; Code letters: NPQR
- Honors and awards: 1 × battle star for World War II service; 6 × battle stars for Korean War service
- Fate: Sold to the Spanish Navy, 19 December 1964

Spain
- Name: Aragón
- Namesake: Autonomous Community of Aragon
- Acquired: 19 December 1964
- Decommissioned: 1980
- Stricken: 1 January 1983
- Identification: Hull symbol: TA-11
- Fate: Scrapped 1987

General characteristics
- Class & type: Haskell-class attack transport
- Type: Type VC2-S-AP5
- Displacement: 6,873 long tons (6,983 t) (light load); 14,837 long tons (15,075 t) (full load)
- Length: 455 ft (139 m)
- Beam: 62 ft (19 m)
- Draft: 24 ft (7.3 m)
- Installed power: 2 × Babcock & Wilcox header-type boilers, 465 psi (3,210 kPa) 750 °F (399 °C); 8,500 shp (6,338 kW)
- Propulsion: 1 × Westinghouse geared turbine; 1 x propeller
- Speed: 17.7 kn (32.8 km/h; 20.4 mph)
- Boats & landing craft carried: 2 × LCMs; 1 × open LCPL; 18 × LCVPs; 2 × LCPRs; 1 × closed LCPL (Captain's Gig)
- Capacity: 2,900 long tons (2,900 t) DWT; 150,000 cu ft (4,200 m^{3}) (non-refrigerated)
- Troops: 87 officers, 1,475 enlisted
- Complement: 56 officers, 480 enlisted
- Armament: 1 × 5 in (127 mm)/38 caliber dual purpose gun; 1 × quad 40 mm (1.6 in) Bofors anti-aircraft (AA) gun mounts; 4 × twin 40mm Bofors (AA) gun mounts; 10 × single 20 mm (0.8 in) Oerlikon cannons AA mounts

Service record
- Part of: TransRon 21 (WWII)
- Operations: World War II; Assault and occupation of Okinawa Gunto (1–5 April 1945); Korean War; Inchon Landing (14–17 September 1950); North Korean Aggression (18–21 September, 8–31 October 1950); Communist China Aggression (2–28 December 1950); First UN Counter Offensive (8–11 February, 27 February–6 March 1951); UN Summer–Fall Offensive (6, 11–14 November 1951); Second Korean Winter (22–23 January, 3–4 February 1952); Vietnam War; Vietnam Advisory Campaign (24 April–4 May, 27 August–12 September 1–10 November 1963)
- Awards: World War II; Navy Unit Commendation; China Service Medal; American Campaign Medal; Asiatic–Pacific Campaign Medal; World War II Victory Medal; Navy Occupation Service Medal; Korean War; National Defense Service Medal; Korean Service Medal; United Nations Korea Medal; Republic of Korea War Service Medal; Vietnam War; Armed Forces Expeditionary Medal

USS Noble (APA-218) was a Haskell-class attack transport, which saw service with the US Navy in World War II, the Korean War, and the Vietnam War. She was transferred to the Spanish Navy in 1964 under a mutual assistance agreement. Noble was named after Noble County, Indiana, Noble County, Ohio, and Noble County, Oklahoma.^{Noble}

== Construction ==
Noble was laid down 20 July 1944, under Maritime Commission (MARCOM) contract, MCV hull 566, by Permanente Metals Corporation, Yard No. 2, Richmond, California; as a modified Victory ship; completed by the Kaiser Shipyard at Richmond; launched 18 October 1944; sponsored by Mrs. Maxine C. Jones; acquired by the Navy 27 November 1944; and commissioned the same day.

== Operational history ==
=== World War II ===
Noble's primary mission was to transport to a combat area the men and some of the material necessary for an assault on an enemy shore. Her main armament, her boat group, was designed to deliver her troops and cargo to the beach in a planned and orderly fashion. After discharging troops and equipment, she could evacuate casualties or prisoners of war.

==== Invasion of Okinawa ====
In January 1945, Noble steamed westward to participate in the Okinawa campaign.

=== Post-war duties ===
Upon termination of the war, she assisted in the delivery of released allied prisoners of war from Korea to the Philippines. She also participated in Operation Magic Carpet, returning servicemen from the Pacific to the United States. Noble was attached to the US Atlantic Fleet from 1946 through 1949, operating out of Norfolk, Virginia.

=== Korean War ===
Noble returned to San Diego 13 September 1949, and was undergoing overhaul at Mare Island Naval Shipyard, San Francisco, when war broke out in Korea in June 1950. In August, she steamed to Korea to participate in the September Inchon amphibious assault. Thereafter, she assisted in the transport of US and foreign troops and equipment to and from the Korean combat zone.

In July 1953, she participated in Operation Big Switch, moving Communist North Korean prisoners from Koje Do to Inchon pursuant to the armistice agreement.

=== Peacetime operations ===
Subsequent to the Korean War, Noble conducted training operations in both the eastern and western Pacific areas. In 1955, she assisted in the evacuation of Chinese civilians and military from the Tachen Islands to Formosa. The ship appeared in the 1956 20th Century Fox movie D-Day the Sixth of June starring Robert Taylor, Richard Todd, and Dana Wynter and in the 1956 movie Between Heaven and Hell starring Robert Wagner, Terry Moore, and Buddy Ebsen. At the outset of the Cuban Missile Crisis on 27 October 1962, Noble embarked 1,400 marines with their equipment and steamed for the Caribbean in company with other Pacific Fleet amphibious units. She returned to San Diego in December, then deployed to WestPac in March 1963 for a tour with the Seventh Fleet Amphibious Ready Group.

=== Transfer to the Spanish Navy ===
Noble returned to San Diego in December 1963, and conducted upkeep and training operations until she decommissioned 1 July 1964. She then entered the Mare Island Naval Shipyard for preparation for transfer to Spain under a mutual assistance program. The transfer ceremony took place 19 December at San Francisco.

== Spanish service ==
Renamed attack transport Aragón (TA-11), by the Spanish Navy, the ship served until being laid up and struck from the Spanish Navy Vessel Register on 1 January 1982. She was sold for scrap in 1987.

== Notes ==
^Noble Noble County, Indiana, was named for Noah Noble, an early governor of that state; Noble County, Ohio, was named for Warren P. Noble, an early settler, member of the Ohio House of Representatives and a US Representative from Ohio; and Noble County, Oklahoma, was named for John Willock Noble, Secretary of the Interior from 1889 to 1893.

Citations

== Bibliography ==
Online resources

- "Noble II (APA-218)". Dictionary of American Naval Fighting Ships. Naval History and Heritage Command. 13 August 2015. This article incorporates text from this source, which is in the public domain.
- "Kaiser Permanente No. 2, Richmond CA". www.ShipbuildingHistory.com. 13 October 2010.
- "USS Noble (APA-218)". NavSource. 7 January 2017.
- "Noble". Dictionary of American Naval Fighting Ships. 1969. p. 487. Archived from the original on 17 October 2007.
