= Si Kahn =

Activist, singer-songwriter (born 1944)

- Born: Si Kahn; April 23, 1944 (age 82); Boston, Massachusetts
- Genre: Folk
- Occupations: Singer-songwriter, activist
- Instruments: vocals, guitar
- Website: www.sikahn.com

Si Kahn (born April 23, 1944) is an American singer-songwriter, and activist; he is the founder and former executive director of Grassroots Leadership.

== Biography ==
=== Early life and education ===
Kahn grew up in State College, Pennsylvania. When he was 15 his family moved to the Washington, D.C. area, where he graduated from Bethesda-Chevy Chase High School. His grandfather Gabriel Kahn, his mother Rosalind Kahn, and his father Benjamin Kahn, a rabbi, instilled a strong sense of the family's Jewish heritage as well as teaching him the rudiments of rhythm and harmony as a child. His uncle, Arnold Aronson, executive secretary of the Leadership Conference on Civil Rights, helped inspire and shape Kahn's career. In 1965, Kahn earned a bachelor's degree from Harvard University. In 1995, he completed a PhD in American Studies from the Union Institute.

=== Musician and activist ===
Kahn moved to the south as an activist in the civil rights movement and he lives in Charlotte, North Carolina. He is the founder and former director of Grassroots Leadership, a non-profit organization which advocates for several causes, including prison reform, improved immigration detention policies, and violence prevention. He retired on May 1, 2010. Most of the profits from Kahn's musical performances benefit the group. He has also been involved with Save Our Cumberland Mountains, an environmentalist group which is opposed to strip mining in Appalachia.

Though Kahn writes songs about a variety of topics, he is especially known for songs about workers and their families, like "Aragon Mill" (1974). He frequently writes songs and occasionally performs, with singer-songwriter and multi-instrumentalist John McCutcheon. Kahn usually accompanies himself on a steel-string acoustic guitar, played with brass fingerpicks.

=== Personal life ===
Kahn's younger sister, Jenette Kahn, was president of DC Comics for 26 years until she stepped down in 2002. Kahn was married to Kathy Kahn, author of a book entitled "Hillbilly Women" (1973) that includes epigraphs based on songs written by Si Kahn and Kathy Kahn.

== Musical style and themes ==
Reviewing Kahn's 1974 New Wood album in Christgau's Record Guide: Rock Albums of the Seventies (1981), Robert Christgau observed "willfully austere Appalachian music" and songs that are "correctives every one (despite an occasional baldness of instructional intent) to the romanticizations of Southern pastoral individualism that are currently so profitable." He called Kahn "an aficionado of poor-white virtues, but not at the expense of his vivid understanding of the labor, sadness, frustration, and small-mindedness that go along with them."

By the time of Kahn's 1979 record Home, Christgau said he was "the most gifted songwriter to come out of the folkie tradition since John Prine", possessing a political outlook in songs that are nonetheless "personal, their overriding theme the emotional dislocations of working far from home." While identifying Kahn's asset as living among ordinary people rather than the folk subculture, the critic credited Kahn's "understated colloquial precision" and concluded that, "some will consider the all-acoustic music thin (it's often solo or duet, twice a cappella) and the voice quavery. I find that both evoke the mountain music of the '20s in a way that makes me long for home myself, and I'm from Queens."

On later albums, Aragon Mill - The Bluegrass Sessions and It's A Dog's Life, Kahn collaborated with the German bluegrass band The Looping Brothers, founded by Ulrich Sieker and Matthias Malcher–two of Europe's best known and awarded blugrass musicians since the 1970s. Kahn himself initiated and featured both albums joining tours in Europe and the United States. It's A Dog's Life (2019) "includes ten previously unrecorded Kahn compositions and features his vocals on three of the thirteen tracks. They include “Government on Horseback," the first single; (Kahn) revives an unrecorded song from 1981."

== Discography ==
- New Wood (1974, June Appal Recordings)
- Home (1979, Flying Fish Records and June Appal Recordings)
- Doing my Job (1982, Flying Fish Records)
- Unfinished Portraits (1984, Flying Fish Records)
- Signs of the Times, with John McCutcheon (1986, Rounder Select)
- Carry It On (with Pete Seeger and Jane Sapp) (1986, Flying Fish Records)
- I'll Be There (1989, Flying Fish Records)
- I Have Seen Freedom (1991, Flying Fish Records)
- Good Times and Bedtimes (1993, Rounder select, family album)
- In My Heart: A Retrospective (1994, StrictlyCountryRecords.com)
- Companion (1997, Appleseed Records)
- Been a Long Time (2000, Sliced Bread Records)
- Threads (2002, Double Time Music)
- We're Still Here, with Liz Meyer and Joost van Es (2004, StrictlyCountryRecords.com)
- Thanksgiving, with Annemarieke Coenders and Linde Nijland (2007, StrictlyCountryRecords.com)
- Courage, with Kathy Mattea (2010, StrictlyCountryRecords.com)
- Bristol Bay, with Jens Kruger (2012, StrictlyCountryRecords.com)
- Aragon Mill: The Bluegrass Sessions, with The Looping Brothers (2013, StrictlyCountryRecords.com)
- It's A Dog's Life, with The Looping Brothers (2019, StrictlyCountryRecords.com)
- Si Kahn @ 75, 5-CD set (2019 StrictlyCountryRecords.com)
- Si Kahn Best of the Rest (2019 StrictlyCountryRecords.com)
- Labor Day with George Mann (2024 StrictlyCountryRecords.com)

== Books authored ==
- How People Get Power: Organizing Oppressed Communities for Action (New York: McGraw-Hill, 1970).
- Organizing: A Guide for Grassroots Leaders (New York: McGraw-Hill, 1982). ISBN 0-07-033199-5
- The Fox in the Henhouse: How Privatization Threatens Democracy, with Elizabeth Minnich (Berrett-Koehler, 2005). ISBN 978-1-57675-337-8
- Creative Community Organizing: A Guide for Rabble Rousers, Activists, and Quiet Lovers of Justice (San Francisco: Berrett-Koehler, 2010). ISBN 978-1-60509-444-1

== Sources ==
- Press, Jaques Cattell (Ed.). ASCAP Biographical Dictionary of Composers, Authors and Publishers, 4th edition, R. R. Bowker, 1980.
