= Bernard W. Aronson =

American politician

Bernie Aronson
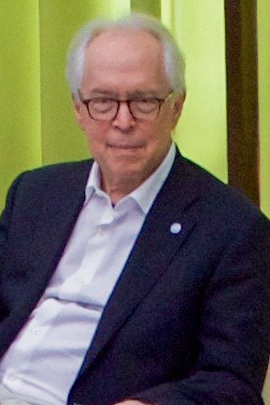

United States Special Envoy for the Colombian Peace Process
- In office February 20, 2015 – January 20, 2017
- President: Barack Obama
- Preceded by: Position established

24th Assistant Secretary of State for Inter-American Affairs
- In office June 16, 1989 – July 2, 1993
- President: George H. W. Bush; Bill Clinton
- Preceded by: Elliott Abrams
- Succeeded by: Alexander Watson

White House Director of Speechwriting
- In office November 24, 1978 – January 20, 1981
- President: Jimmy Carter
- Preceded by: James Fallows
- Succeeded by: Ken Khachigian (Chief Speechwriter)

Personal details
- Born: May 16, 1946 (age 80)
- Party: Democratic
- Relatives: Arnold Aronson (father)
- Education: University of Chicago (BA)

Bernard William Aronson (born May 16, 1946) was United States Assistant Secretary of State for Inter-American Affairs from 1989 to 1993.

== Overview ==
Bernard W. Aronson served four U.S. Presidents -- Jimmy Carter, George H. W. Bush, Bill Clinton, and Barack Obama—in senior positions. He was twice awarded the State Department's highest civilian honor, the Secretary's Distinguished Service Award, for his role in ending the wars in Central America and Colombia. In April 1993 Aronson was awarded the Distinguished Service Award by Secretary of State Warren Christopher for "singular achievements in forging a bipartisan policy towards Nicaragua and tireless and successful efforts to end the civil war in El Salvador." In November 2016 as U.S. Special Envoy to the Colombia Peace Process, Aronson was presented the Distinguished Service Award by Secretary of State John Kerry for "his instrumental role" in ending the 52 year long war between the government of Colombia and the Revolutionary Armed Forces of Colombia (FARC). In his remarks at the February 4, 2016 White House celebration of the 15th anniversary of Plan Colombia, President Barack Obama said, "I especially want to recognize someone who's played a pivotal role in the peace process. That's our Special Envoy, Bernie Aronson."

== Early life and education ==
Bernard W. Aronson was born in May 1946, the son of Annette and Arnold Aronson. He is Jewish. His father was a founder of the Leadership Conference on Civil Rights and received the Medal of Freedom for his civil rights work from President Bill Clinton. Bernard was born in New York City, spent his early years in Queens, and grew up in Rye, New York. He was graduated from the University of Chicago, with a B.A. with Honors in the Humanities in 1967.

== Career in labor movement ==
Following college, Aronson lived for five years in Appalachia. He first served as a Vista Volunteer in Cob Hill, Kentucky where he worked as a community organizer. Aronson also worked for the Council of the Southern Mountains in Berea, Kentucky where he focused on black lung, school lunches for poor children, and opposition to strip mining. He worked as a staff writer for the Raleigh Register newspaper in Beckley, West Virginia and wrote by-line articles for The Washington Post. Aronson joined the staff of the Miners for Democracy (MFD) reform movement within the United Mine Workers of America. After helping defeat Tony Boyle, the dictatorial boss of the United Mine Workers of America (UMW), later convicted of the murder of MFD founder Jock Yablonski, in an election in February 1972, Aronson moved to Washington, D.C., where he served as Assistant to the new reform President, Arnold Miller. At the UMW, Aronson led a 13-month-long organizing campaign in Harlan County, Kentucky. Aronson appears twice in the Academy Award-winning documentary Harlan County, U.S.A., which chronicles the strike. Aronson served six years in the United States Army Reserve and received an honorable discharge in 1976.

== Career in government ==
Aronson worked at the White House from 1977 to 1981 as Special Assistant and Speechwriter to Vice President of the United States Walter Mondale, Executive Speechwriter to President of the United States Jimmy Carter, and Deputy Assistant to the President in the Office of the Chief of Staff. In 1981, he became director of policy of the Democratic National Committee. From 1984 to 1988, he was president of the Policy Project.

Aronson, a lifelong Democrat, was appointed Assistant Secretary of State for Inter-American Affairs in February 1989 by Republican President George H. W. Bush, to pursue a bipartisan policy towards Central America. Aronson and Secretary of State James Baker negotiated the Bi-Partisan Accord on Central America, signed at the White House, March 24, 1989, which united the new Administration and leaders of the United States Congress in both parties behind the Central American Peace Plan authored by Nobel Peace Prize laureate, President Oscar Arias of Costa Rica. Aronson convinced the new Administration to make cooperation in Central America the first test of Soviet Premier Mikhail Gorbachev's "new thinking" in foreign policy. Aronson's first official trip as Assistant Secretary was to Moscow to enlist the Soviet Union in supporting democratic elections in Nicaragua and an end the wars in Nicaragua and El Salvador.

Aronson faced multiple crises in the Western Hemisphere at the start of his tenure. At the end of his service Central America was at peace; Nicaragua had held its first democratic elections ousting the Sandinista dictatorship; Panamanian dictator General Manuel Noriega was in U.S. prison and a democratically elected government in office; Peru, with strong U.S. support had defeated Sendero Luminoso; Argentina and Brazil had placed their nuclear programs under the supervision of the International Atomic Energy Agency and signed the Non-Proliferation Treaty; Haiti had held its first non-violent presidential election; Chile had made a peaceful transfer of power from the Augusto Pinochet dictatorship to a new democratically elected government, the Organization of American States had unanimously adopted the Santiago Declaration committing its member states to the collective defense of democracy; and every nation in the southern Hemisphere except Cuba had a democratically elected government.

At the end of his tenure in July 1993, Aronson received the Distinguished Service Award from Secretary of State Warren Christopher for "singular achievements in forging a bipartisan policy towards Nicaragua and tireless and successful efforts to end the civil war in El Salvador."

In February 2015, Aronson returned to government service when President Barack Obama appointed him U.S. Special Envoy to the Colombian Peace Process. In that capacity, Aronson made 25 trips to Havana, where peace talks were held, to help the parties negotiate a peace agreement. On February 4, 2016, President Obama hosted a 15th anniversary celebration of Plan Colombia at the White House. In his remarks, Obama said, "I especially want to recognize someone who played a vital role in the peace process. That's our Special Envoy, Bernie Aronson." In November 2016, Aronson received the Distinguished Service Award from Secretary of State John Kerry, "in recognition of your extraordinary service as Special Envoy to the Colombian Peace Process. Your steadfast determination, resolve, boundless energy, and exceptional negotiating skills were instrumental in brokering peace between the government of Colombia government and the Revolutionary Armed Forces of Colombia (FARC) ending the longest running conflict in the western Hemisphere."

== Career in business and non-profit ==
In 1993, following his tenure as Assistant Secretary of State, Aronson joined Goldman Sachs as an International Advisor for Latin America. In 1996, he co-founded ACON Investments, a mid-market private equity firm that invests in Latin America and the United States.

Aronson was a founding board member of the Center for Global Development; board member of the Amazon Conservation Team, the National Democratic Institute, and Freedom House. He is a Member of the Council on Foreign Relations, the Inter-American Dialogue, and the American Academy of Diplomacy. He also served on a variety of corporate boards of both private and public companies, including Global Hyatt; Liz Claiborne; Royal Caribbean International; Lindblad Expeditions; Mariner Energy; Kate Spade.

Political offices
Preceded by Elliott Abrams	Assistant Secretary of State for Western Hemisphere Affairs; 1989–1993	Succeeded by Alexander Watson
Diplomatic posts
New office	United States Special Envoy for the Colombian Peace Process; 2015–2017	Vacant
