= List of ambassadors of the United States to Peru =

Ambassador of the United States to Peru
- Seal of the United States Department of State

- Flag of a United States ambassador

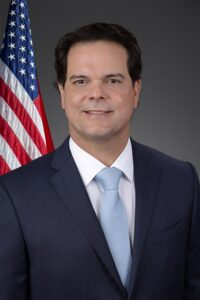
- Incumbent; Bernie Navarro since February 3, 2026
- Nominator: The president of the United States
- Appointer: The president; with Senate advice and consent
- Inaugural holder: James Cooley as Chargé d'Affaires
- Formation: May 21, 1827
- Website: U.S. Embassy - Lima

The following is a list of United States ambassadors, or other chiefs of mission, to Peru. The title given by the United States State Department to this position is currently Ambassador Extraordinary and Minister Plenipotentiary.

== List of representatives ==
| Representative | Title | Presentation of credentials | Termination of mission | Appointed by |
|---|---|---|---|---|
| James Cooley | Chargé d'Affaires | May 21, 1827 | February 24, 1828 | John Quincy Adams |
| Samuel Larned | Chargé d'Affaires | November 30, 1829 | March 6, 1837 | John Quincy Adams |
| James B. Thornton | Chargé d'Affaires | March 16, 1837 | December 10, 1837 | Andrew Jackson |
| J. C. Pickett | Chargé d'Affaires | January 30, 1840 | April 28, 1845 | Martin Van Buren |
| John A. Bryan | Chargé d'Affaires | April 28, 1845 | August 4, 1845 | John Tyler |
| Albert G. Jewett | Chargé d'Affaires | August 4, 1845 | July 21, 1847 | James K. Polk |
| John Randolph Clay | Chargé d'Affaires | December 15, 1847 | August 22, 1853 | James K. Polk |
| John Randolph Clay | Envoy Extraordinary and Minister Plenipotentiary | August 22, 1853 | October 27, 1860 | Franklin Pierce |
| Christopher Robinson | Envoy Extraordinary and Minister Plenipotentiary | January 11, 1862 | December 21, 1865 | Abraham Lincoln |
| Alvin P. Hovey | Envoy Extraordinary and Minister Plenipotentiary | May 22, 1866 | September 22, 1870 | Andrew Johnson |
| Thomas Settle | Envoy Extraordinary and Minister Plenipotentiary | May 13, 1871 | November 22, 1871 | Ulysses S. Grant |
| Francis Thomas | Envoy Extraordinary and Minister Plenipotentiary | July 10, 1872 | July 5, 1875 | Ulysses S. Grant |
| Richard Gibbs | Envoy Extraordinary and Minister Plenipotentiary | July 10, 1875 | April 15, 1879 | Ulysses S. Grant |
| Isaac P. Christiancy | Envoy Extraordinary and Minister Plenipotentiary | April 19, 1879 | August 2, 1881 | Rutherford B. Hayes |
| Stephen A. Hurlbut | Envoy Extraordinary and Minister Plenipotentiary | August 2, 1881 | March 27, 1882 | James Garfield |
| Seth Ledyard Phelps | Envoy Extraordinary and Minister Plenipotentiary | April 24, 1884 | June 24, 1885 | Chester A. Arthur |
| Charles W. Buck | Envoy Extraordinary and Minister Plenipotentiary | September 1881 | March 13, 1889 | Grover Cleveland |
| John Hicks | Envoy Extraordinary and Minister Plenipotentiary | May 31, 1889 | June 24, 1893 | Benjamin Harrison |
| James A. McKenzie | Envoy Extraordinary and Minister Plenipotentiary | June 24, 1893 | April 13, 1897 | Grover Cleveland |
| Irving B. Dudley | Envoy Extraordinary and Minister Plenipotentiary | September 20, 1897 | February 14, 1907 | William McKinley |
| Leslie Combs | Envoy Extraordinary and Minister Plenipotentiary | April 10, 1907 | February 23, 1911 | Theodore Roosevelt |
| H. Clay Howard | Envoy Extraordinary and Minister Plenipotentiary | May 1, 1911 | September 9, 1913 | William H. Taft |
| Benton McMillin | Envoy Extraordinary and Minister Plenipotentiary | September 9, 1913 | September 5, 1919 | Woodrow Wilson |
| William E. Gonzales | Ambassador Extraordinary and Plenipotentiary | April 24, 1920 | October 11, 1921 | Woodrow Wilson |
| Miles Poindexter | Ambassador Extraordinary and Plenipotentiary | April 20, 1923 | March 21, 1928 | Calvin Coolidge |
| Alexander P. Moore | Ambassador Extraordinary and Plenipotentiary | June 11, 1928 | July 10, 1929 | Calvin Coolidge |
| Fred Morris Dearing | Ambassador Extraordinary and Plenipotentiary | May 23, 1930 | June 3, 1937 | Herbert Hoover |
| Laurence A. Steinhardt | Ambassador Extraordinary and Plenipotentiary | September 13, 1937 | April 10, 1939 | Franklin D. Roosevelt |
| Raymond Henry Norweb | Ambassador Extraordinary and Plenipotentiary | April 10, 1940 | September 30, 1943 | Franklin D. Roosevelt |
| John Campbell White | Ambassador Extraordinary and Plenipotentiary | April 4, 1944 | June 17, 1945 | Franklin D. Roosevelt |
| William D. Pawley | Ambassador Extraordinary and Plenipotentiary | July 20, 1945 | April 27, 1946 | Harry S. Truman |
| Prentice Cooper | Ambassador Extraordinary and Plenipotentiary | July 1, 1946 | June 29, 1948 | Harry S. Truman |
| Harold H. Tittmann Jr. | Ambassador Extraordinary and Plenipotentiary | September 27, 1948 | March 30, 1955 | Harry S. Truman |
| Ellis O. Briggs | Ambassador Extraordinary and Plenipotentiary | March 27, 1955 | June 5, 1956 | Dwight D. Eisenhower |
| Theodore C. Achilles | Ambassador Extraordinary and Plenipotentiary | July 24, 1956 | January 27, 1960 | Dwight D. Eisenhower |
| Selden Chapin | Ambassador Extraordinary and Plenipotentiary | May 7, 1960 | August 7, 1960 | Dwight D. Eisenhower |
| James Loeb | Ambassador Extraordinary and Plenipotentiary | May 23, 1961 | July 26, 1962 | John F. Kennedy |
| J. Wesley Jones | Ambassador Extraordinary and Plenipotentiary | February 6, 1963 | June 2, 1969 | John F. Kennedy |
| Taylor G. Belcher | Ambassador Extraordinary and Plenipotentiary | August 29, 1969 | April 4, 1974 | Richard Nixon |
| Robert W. Dean | Ambassador Extraordinary and Plenipotentiary | May 2, 1974 | June 17, 1977 | Richard Nixon |
| Harry W. Shlaudeman | Ambassador Extraordinary and Plenipotentiary | June 28, 1977 | October 20, 1980 | Jimmy Carter |
| Edwin Gharst Corr | Ambassador Extraordinary and Plenipotentiary | November 6, 1980 | October 11, 1981 | Jimmy Carter |
| Frank V. Ortiz Jr. | Ambassador Extraordinary and Plenipotentiary | November 10, 1981 | October 27, 1983 | Ronald Reagan |
| David C. Jordan | Ambassador Extraordinary and Plenipotentiary | March 20, 1984 | July 17, 1986 | Ronald Reagan |
| Alexander Fletcher Watson | Ambassador Extraordinary and Plenipotentiary | November 27, 1986 | August 9, 1989 | Ronald Reagan |
| Anthony Cecil Eden Quainton | Ambassador Extraordinary and Plenipotentiary | December 11, 1989 | September 16, 1992 | George H. W. Bush |
| Charles H. Brayshaw | Chargé d'Affaires ad interim | September 16, 1992 | December 15, 1993 | George H. W. Bush |
| Alvin P. Adams, Jr. | Ambassador Extraordinary and Plenipotentiary | December 15, 1993 | August 16, 1996 | Bill Clinton |
| Dennis C. Jett | Ambassador Extraordinary and Plenipotentiary | October 16, 1996 | July 3, 1999 | Bill Clinton |
| John Randle Hamilton | Ambassador Extraordinary and Plenipotentiary | September 6, 1999 | July 10, 2002 | Bill Clinton |
| John R. Dawson | Ambassador Extraordinary and Plenipotentiary | December 2, 2002 | June 10, 2003 | George W. Bush |
| James Curtis Struble | Ambassador Extraordinary and Plenipotentiary | February 4, 2004 | August 13, 2007 | George W. Bush |
| P. Michael McKinley | Ambassador Extraordinary and Plenipotentiary | August 27, 2007 | July 14, 2010 | George W. Bush |
| Rose M. Likins | Ambassador Extraordinary and Plenipotentiary | September 15, 2010 | June 27, 2014 | Barack Obama |
| Brian A. Nichols | Ambassador Extraordinary and Plenipotentiary | July 3, 2014 | October 13, 2017 | Barack Obama |
| Krishna Urs | Ambassador Extraordinary and Plenipotentiary | October 25, 2017 | July 29, 2020 | Donald Trump |
| Denison Offutt | Chargé d'Affaires | July 29, 2020 | March 10, 2021 | Donald Trump |
| Lisa D. Kenna | Ambassador Extraordinary and Plenipotentiary | March 22, 2021 | September 8, 2023 | Joe Biden |
| John T. McNamara | Chargé d'Affaires | September 8, 2023 | June 20, 2024 | Joe Biden |
| Stephanie Syptak-Ramnath | Ambassador Extraordinary and Plenipotentiary | June 20, 2024 | April 18, 2025 | Joe Biden |
| Joan Perkins | Chargé d'Affaires | April 18, 2025 | February 3, 2026 | Donald Trump |
| Bernie Navarro | Ambassador Extraordinary and Plenipotentiary | February 3, 2026 | Present | Donald Trump |

== See also ==
- Peru – United States relations
- Foreign relations of Peru
- Ambassadors of the United States
- Embassy of the United States, Lima
