= Dennis C. Jett =

American diplomat (born 1945)

Dennis Jett

United States Ambassador to Peru
- In office October 16, 1996 – July 3, 1999
- President: Bill Clinton
- Preceded by: Alvin P. Adams, Jr.
- Succeeded by: John Randle Hamilton

United States Ambassador to Mozambique
- In office November 17, 1993 – July 20, 1996
- President: Bill Clinton
- Preceded by: Townsend B. Friedman, Jr.
- Succeeded by: Brian D. Curran

Personal details
- Born: 1945 (age 80–81) New Mexico, U.S.
- Education: University of New Mexico; University of the Witwatersrand
- Occupation: Professor at Pennsylvania State University

Dennis Coleman Jett (born 1945) is an American diplomat and academic. He served as the United States ambassador to Mozambique and Peru under the Clinton administration and from 2008 to 2025 was a professor of international relations at the School of International Affairs at The Pennsylvania State University. From 2000 to 2008, he was the Dean of the International Center and lecturer of political science at the University of Florida.

== Diplomatic career ==
Jett is from New Mexico. He attended the University of New Mexico, where he earned his Bachelor of Arts degree (1968) and Master of Arts (1969) in economics. He later earned a Ph.D. in international relations from the University of the Witwatersrand in 1998. Following his graduation from the University of New Mexico, Jett worked as an economist for the New Mexico state government before joining the United States Foreign Service.

Jett was a Foreign Service Officer from 1972 to August 2000. During his time in the Foreign Service he was posted in Buenos Aires, Argentina (political officer, 1990), Tel Aviv, Israel (science attaché), Lilongwe, Malawi (Deputy Chief of Mission), and Monrovia, Liberia (Deputy Chief of Mission).

Jett has also served as Executive Assistant to the Under Secretary of State for Political Affairs and on the National Security Council as special assistant to the President and senior director for African affairs. His final assignment for the State Department was as senior advisor on Africa at the Carter Center in Atlanta working on projects in democracy and conflict resolution.

=== Ambassador to Mozambique ===
Jett served as United States Ambassador to Mozambique from 1993 to 1996 and helped bring the UN peacekeeping mission there to a successful conclusion.

=== Ambassador to Peru ===
Jett was United States Ambassador to Peru from 1996 to 1999. He attended a reception at the Japanese ambassadorial residence in Lima on December 17, 1996, but left the gathering early, narrowly escaping becoming a hostage, when members of the Túpac Amaru Revolutionary Movement stormed the residence and held hundreds hostage for 126 days in the incident known as the Japanese embassy hostage crisis.

Jett received his Ph.D. in international relations from the University of the Witwatersrand in 1998. His dissertation, "Why Peacekeeping Fails," was published by (Palgrave Macmillan in 2001) and a second, revised edition of the book came out in 2019.

Jett was noted as a critic of American citizen Lori Berenson, who is imprisoned in Peru for her association with MRTA members; he was unsympathetic when a human rights delegation, including Berenson's parents, came to visit in March 1999. In February 2002 Jett wrote an op-ed published in the Washington Post entitled "No Tears for Terrorists," in which he likened Berenson to John Walker Lindh and said Berenson was a terrorist who exercised "monumentally bad judgment." The article contrasted the reaction to Lindh's involvement in terrorism as opposed to Berenson's participation in it. Berenson's parents said that Jett's article was "intensely poisonous" and contained "outrageously mean-spirited, blatantly inaccurate, and erroneous statements about her to discredit support for her release from her wrongful six-year and four-month incarceration." After years of denials by her parents, in mid-2010 Berenson confessed that she had knowing aided the MRTA when she wrote to the pardon commission and to Peruvian President Alan Garcia admitting to her "criminal collaboration with a terrorist organization."http://www.peruviantimes.com/guilt-repentance-and-innocence-lori-berenson-and-her-baby-might-be-going-back-to-prison/206625

In October 2011, The Christian Science Monitor profiled Jett in an article on leadership. https://www.csmonitor.com/World/2011/1129/Leadership-A-constructive-rebel-bucks-hierarchy He frequently contributes op-ed pieces to the McClatchy newspapers and other publications, which are also on the Huffington Post.

== Academic career ==
From 2000 to 2008, Jett served as dean of the International Center and lecturer of political science at the University of Florida.

He was the moderator when U.S. Senator John Kerry came to the UF to speak on September 17, 2007, when the Taser incident occurred.

In spring of 2008, he taught Making American Foreign Policy at the University of Florida.

In the summer 2008 he moved to the Pennsylvania State University to become part of the inaugural faculty of the newly created School of International Affairs. He retired from Penn State in 2025 and became a professor emeritus of the School.

Jett's second book, Why American Foreign Policy Fails (Palgrave Macmillan) was published in May 2008. His third book, "American Ambassadors - The Past, Present and Future of America's Diplomats," (Palgrave Macmillan) was published in 2014 and a heavily revised and updated, second edition came out in 2022. He also wrote "The Iran Nuclear Deal - Bombs, Bureaucrats and Billionaires" which was also published by Palgrave.

Jett received the James F. Zimmerman Award from the University of New Mexico Alumni Association in 2001.

Diplomatic posts
Preceded by Townsend B. Friedman, Jr.	United States Ambassador to Mozambique; 1993–1996	Succeeded by Brian D. Curran
Preceded by Alvin P. Adams, Jr.	United States Ambassador to Peru; 1996–1999	Succeeded by John Randle Hamilton
