= History of United States diplomatic relations by country =

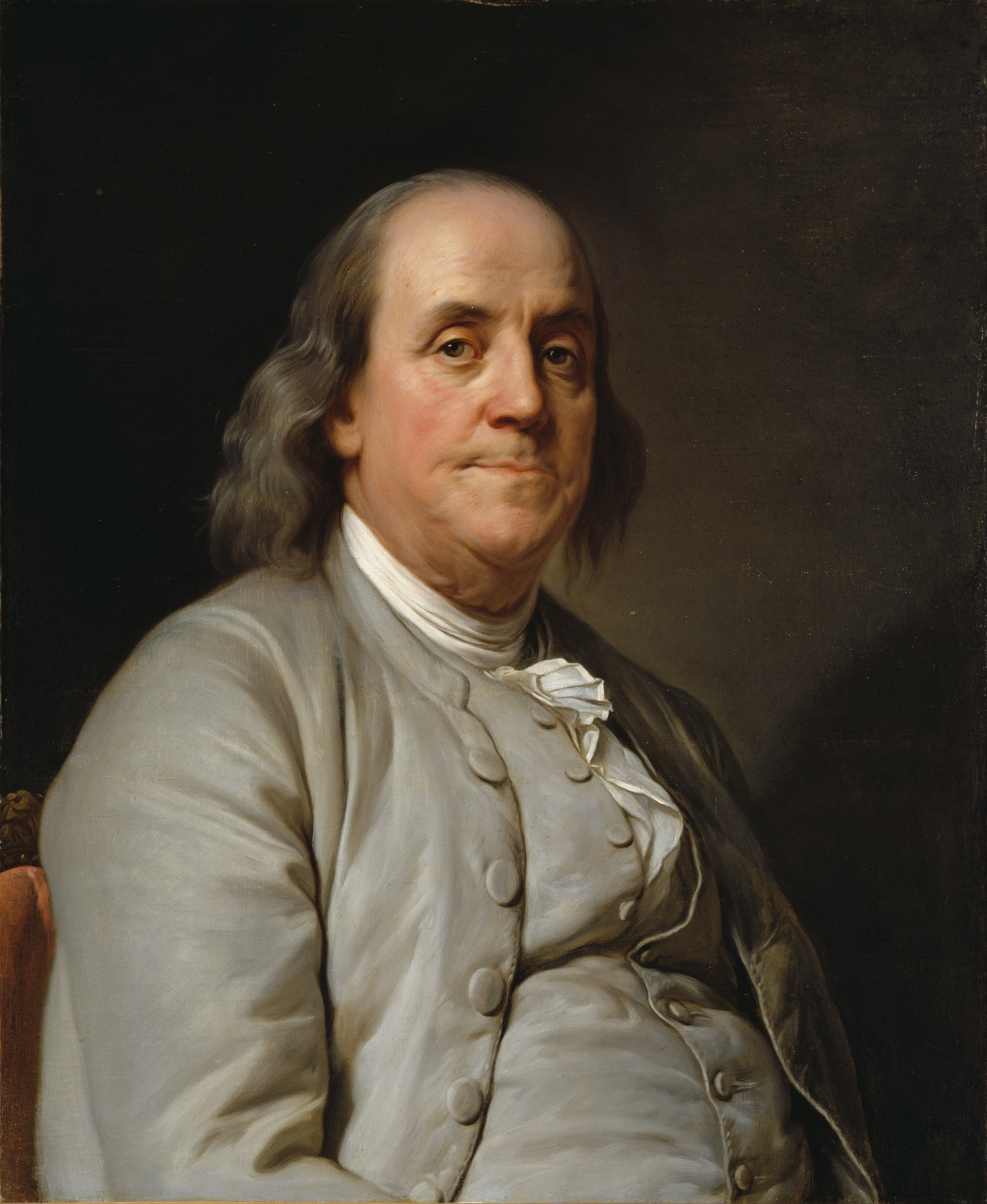
Benjamin Franklin, the first minister (ambassador) appointed by the United States of America

This is a summary history of diplomatic relations of the United States listed by country. The history of diplomatic relations of the United States began with the appointment of Benjamin Franklin as U.S. Minister to France in 1778, even before the U.S. had won its independence from Great Britain in 1783.

The information is drawn from official records of the United States Department of State. This history encompasses the following information for each nation that the United States has recognized, or with which the U.S. has had diplomatic relations:

- Country name
- Date of establishment of a consulate in that country, or date of appointment of a consul.
- Date on which the U.S. recognized the country.
- Date of establishment of diplomatic relations with the country. This is often, but not always, the date of appointment of the first minister or ambassador.
- The date on which a legation or embassy was established in the country.
- The name of the first minister or ambassador to the country. In many cases, a chargé d’affaires was appointed first and represented the U.S. until an envoy was commissioned.
- The date on which diplomatic relations ended between the U.S. and the country.
- Additional notes on U.S. diplomatic relations with the country.

== Countries ==
- Afghanistan
  - Consulate:
  - Recognized: 1921
  - Relations established: 1935
  - Legation/embassy established: 1942; embassy established in 1946
  - First ambassador: William Harrison Hornibrook
  - Relations ended: —
  - Notes:
1. U.S. Ambassador Adolph Dubs was assassinated in 1979.
2. The U.S. Embassy at Kabul was closed on January 30, 1989, due to concerns that the new regime would not be able protect diplomats after the Soviet withdrawal. Following the ouster of the Taliban, the embassy was reopened in January 2002 with Ryan Crocker as ambassador.

- Albania (1)
  - Consulate:
  - Recognized: 1922
  - Relations established: 1922
  - Legation/embassy established: 1922
  - First ambassador: Ulysses Grant-Smith
  - Relations ended: 1939
  - Notes:
1. U.S.–Albanian diplomatic relations ended on June 5, 1939, after the Italian invasion of Albania, when the Albanian Minister for Foreign Affairs notified the American Minister in Albania that Italy had taken control of Albania's foreign affairs.

- Albania (2)
  - Consulate:
  - Recognized: 1991
  - Relations established: 1991
  - Legation/embassy established: 1991
  - First ambassador: William Edwin Ryerson
  - Relations ended: —

- Algeria
  - Consulate: 1796
  - Recognized: 1962
  - Relations established: 1962
  - Legation/embassy established: 1962
  - First ambassador: William J. Porter
  - Relations ended: —
  - Notes:
1. Algeria severed diplomatic relations with the U.S. in 1967 in the wake of the 1967 Arab-Israeli war. A U.S. Interests Section was established in the Swiss Embassy. Relations were reestablished in 1974.

- Andorra
  - Consulate:
  - Recognized: 1995
  - Relations established: 1995
  - Legation/embassy established: —
  - First ambassador: Edward L. Romero (1998)
  - Relations ended: —
  - Notes:
1. The U.S. Ambassador to Spain is also accredited to Andorra while resident in Madrid. There is no U.S. embassy in Andorra.

- Angola
  - Consulate: 1992
  - Recognized: 1993
  - Relations established: 1994
  - Legation/embassy established: 1994
  - First ambassador: Edmund T. DeJarnette
  - Relations ended: —
  - Notes:
1. Angola became independent of Portugal in 1975, but the U.S. did not recognize the government of Angola declared by the MPLA. The U.S. recognized Angola after multiparty elections were held in 1992.

- Antigua and Barbuda
  - Consulate:
  - Recognized: 1981
  - Relations established: 1981
  - Legation/embassy established: 1981
  - First ambassador: Milan D. Bish
  - Relations ended: —
  - Notes:
1. The American Embassy at St. Johns was closed June 30, 1994. Subsequent ambassadors to Antigua and Barbuda remained resident at Bridgetown, Barbados.

- Arab Federation
  - Consulate:
  - Recognized: 1958
  - Relations established: —
  - Legation/embassy established: —
  - First ambassador: —
  - Relations ended: 1958
  - Notes:
1. The Arab Federation was a short-lived union between Iraq and Jordan, that lasted February 14 – August 2, 1958. The U.S. recognized the federation but never established diplomatic relations.

- Argentina
  - Consulate:
  - Recognized: 1823
  - Relations established: 1823
  - Legation/embassy established: 1823
  - First ambassador: Caesar Augustus Rodney
  - Relations ended: —
  - Notes:
1. Diplomatic relations were interrupted in 1944 and resumed in 1945.

- Armenia (1)
  - Consulate: 1896
  - Recognized: 1920
  - Relations established: —
  - Legation/embassy established: —
  - First ambassador: Steven Mann (chargé d’affaires)
  - Relations ended: 1920
  - Notes:
1. By the end of 1920, the Armenian Republic had ceased to exist as an independent state, with its territory either seized by Turkey or established as the Armenian Soviet Republic, which subsequently joined the Soviet Union.

- Armenia (2)
  - Consulate:
  - Recognized: 1991
  - Relations established: 1992
  - Legation/embassy established: 1992
  - First ambassador: Harry J. Gilmore
  - Relations ended: —

- Australia
  - Consulate:
  - Recognized: 1940
  - Relations established: 1940
  - Legation/embassy established: 1940
  - First ambassador: Clarence E. Gauss
  - Relations ended: —

- Austrian Empire
  - Consulate: 1797
  - Recognized: 1838
  - Relations established: 1838
  - Legation/embassy established: 1838
  - First ambassador: Henry A. Muhlenberg
  - Relations ended: 1917
  - Notes:
1. On April 8, 1917, the Austro-Hungarian Empire severed diplomatic relations with the United States. Several months later, on December 7, 1917, the U.S. declared war upon Austria-Hungary.

- Austria
  - Consulate:
  - Recognized: 1921
  - Relations established: 1921
  - Legation/embassy established: 1921
  - First ambassador: Albert Henry Washburn
  - Relations ended: —
  - Notes:
1. Relations with Austria were broken in 1938 after the Anschluss and resumed in 1946.

- Azerbaijan
  - Consulate:
  - Recognized: 1991
  - Relations established: 1992
  - Legation/embassy established: 1992
  - First ambassador: Robert Finn
  - Relations ended: —

- Baden, Grand Duchy of
  - Consulate: 1832
  - Recognized: 1832
  - Relations established: 1832
  - Legation/embassy established: 1833*
  - First ambassador: C.F. Hoyer (Consul)
  - Relations ended: 1917
  - Notes:
1. Relations were with the Grand Duchy of Baden were severed in 1917 when the U.S. entered WWI.

- Bahamas
  - Consulate:
  - Recognized: 1973
  - Relations established: 1973
  - Legation/embassy established: 1973
  - First ambassador: Moncrieff J. Spear
  - Relations ended: —

- Bahrain
  - Consulate:
  - Recognized: 1971
  - Relations established: 1971
  - Legation/embassy established: 1971
  - First ambassador: Joseph W. Twinam (1974)
  - Relations ended: —

- Bangladesh
  - Consulate: 1949
  - Recognized: 1972
  - Relations established: 1972
  - Legation/embassy established: 1972
  - First ambassador: Davis Eugene Boster
  - Relations ended: —
  - Notes:
1. The consulate in Dhaka was established when Bangladesh was a province of Pakistan known as East Pakistan.

- Barbados
  - Consulate: 1823
  - Recognized: 1966
  - Relations established: 1966
  - Legation/embassy established: 1966
  - First ambassador: Frederic R. Mann (1967)
  - Relations ended: —
  - Notes:
1. The U.S. consulate in Barbados was established when Barbados was a British colony.

- Bavaria
  - Consulate: 1833
  - Recognized: 1833
  - Relations established: 1833
  - Legation/embassy established: —
  - First ambassador: Robert de Ruedorffer (Consul)
  - Relations ended: 1917
  - Notes:
1. George Bancroft was the U.S. minister to Prussia and was specially accredited to Bavaria, but was not the official minister.
2. Relations with Bavaria were severed in 1917 when the U.S. entered WWI.

- Belarus
  - Consulate:
  - Recognized: 1991
  - Relations established: 1991
  - Legation/embassy established: 1992
  - First ambassador: David Heywood Swartz
  - Relations ended: —
  - Notes:
1. U.S. Ambassador Karen B. Stewart was recalled in 2008. As of May 2011 no ambassador had been appointed.

- Belgium
  - Consulate:
  - Recognized: 1832
  - Relations established: 1832
  - Legation/embassy established: 1832
  - First ambassador: John Jacob Seibels (1854)
  - Relations ended: —
  - Notes:
1. A series of chargés d’affaires represented the U.S. in Belgium until 1854 when the first ranking minister was appointed.
2. The United States closed its embassy in Brussels on July 15, 1940, after the German invasion of Belgium. The embassy was reopened September 14, 1944. During the war, relations were maintained with the government-in-exile in London.

- Belize
  - Consulate: 1847
  - Recognized: 1981
  - Relations established: 1981
  - Legation/embassy established: 1981
  - First ambassador: Malcolm R. Barnebey
  - Relations ended: —

- Benin
  - Consulate:
  - Recognized: 1960
  - Relations established: 1960
  - Legation/embassy established: 1961
  - First ambassador: R. Borden Reams
  - Relations ended: —
  - Notes:
1. Ambassador Reams was commissioned to Dahomey, Ivory Coast, Niger, and Upper Volta while resident in Abidjan.
2. Benin was known as Dahomey until 1975.

- Bhutan
  - Consulate: —
  - Recognition: —
  - Diplomatic relations: —
  - First ambassador: —
  - Relations ended: —
  - Notes:
1. There is no record of U.S. recognition of Bhutan, and the U.S. does not maintain diplomatic relations with Bhutan. The U.S. embassy in New Delhi, India, has consular responsibilities for Bhutan. Informal contact is maintained through the U.S. embassy and the Bhutanese embassy in New Delhi.

- Bolivia
  - Consulate:
  - Recognized: 1848
  - Relations established: 1849
  - Legation/embassy established: 1849
  - First ambassador: John W. Dana (1854)
  - Relations ended: —
  - Notes:
1. A series of chargés represented the U.S. to Bolivia until the first ranking minister was appointed in 1854.
2. See also Peru–Bolivia Confederation.

- Bosnia and Herzegovina
  - Consulate:
  - Recognized: 1992
  - Relations established: 1992
  - Legation/embassy established: 1993
  - First ambassador: Victor Jackovich
  - Relations ended: —

- Botswana
  - Consulate:
  - Recognized: 1966
  - Relations established: 1966
  - Legation/embassy established: 1966
  - First ambassador: Charles J. Nelson (1971)
  - Relations ended: —
  - Notes:
1. Until 1979 one ambassador was accredited to Botswana, Swaziland, and Lesotho while resident at Gaborone.

- Brazil
  - Consulate:
  - Recognized: 1824
  - Relations established: 1824
  - Legation/embassy established: 1825
  - First ambassador: William Hunter (1842)
  - Relations ended: —
  - Notes:
1. A series of chargés represented the U.S. to Brazil until the first ranking minister was appointed in 1842.

- Brunei
  - Consulate: 1865
  - Recognized: 1984
  - Relations established: 1984
  - Legation/embassy established: 1984
  - First ambassador: Barrington King
  - Relations ended: —

- Brunswick-Lüneburg, Duchy of
  - Consulate: 1856
  - Recognized: 1848
  - Relations established: —
  - Legation/embassy established: —
  - First ambassador: —
  - Relations ended: 1916
  - Notes:
1. The United States and the Duchy recognized each other but never established diplomatic relation. The Duchy joined the North German Confederation in 1867 and thus ceased to handle its own foreign affairs.

- Bulgaria
  - Consulate: 1912
  - Recognized: 1908
  - Relations established: 1903
  - Legation/embassy established: 1919
  - First ambassador: John Ridgely Carter (1910)
  - Relations ended: —
  - Notes:
1. A series of representatives with the title Diplomatic Agent represented the U.S. in Bulgaria until the first ranking minister was appointed in 1910.
2. The first ministers were accredited to Romania, Serbia, and Bulgaria, while resident at Bucharest, Romania.
3. Bulgaria severed diplomatic relations with the U.S. in 1941. Relations were reestablished in 1947, and the legation was reopened. Relations were again severed in 1950 and resumed in 1959.

- Burkina Faso
  - Consulate:
  - Recognized: 1960
  - Relations established: 1960
  - Legation/embassy established: 1960
  - First ambassador: R. Borden Reams
  - Relations ended: —
  - Notes:
1. Burkina Faso was known as Upper Volta Until 1984.
2. Ambassador Reams was commissioned to Dahomey, Ivory Coast, Niger, and Upper Volta while resident in Abidjan.

- Burma
  - Consulate:
  - Recognized: 1948
  - Relations established: 1947
  - Legation/embassy established: 1947
  - First ambassador: J. Klahr Huddle
  - Relations ended: —
  - Notes:
1. In 1989 the government of Burma changed the name of the country to Myanmar, but the U.S. and other nations do not recognize the legitimacy of the government and hence the change of name.

- Burundi
  - Consulate:
  - Recognized: 1962
  - Relations established: 1962
  - Legation/embassy established: 1962
  - First ambassador: Donald A. Dumont
  - Relations ended: —

- Cambodia
  - Consulate:
  - Recognized: 1950
  - Relations established: 1950
  - Legation/embassy established: 1950
  - First ambassador: Donald R. Heath
  - Relations ended: —
  - Notes:
1. Cambodia severed diplomatic relations with the U.S. in 1965 and restored relations in 1969. Relations were again broken in 1975 and reestablished in 1991.

- Cameroon
  - Consulate:
  - Recognized: 1960
  - Relations established: 1960
  - Legation/embassy established: 1960
  - First ambassador: Leland Barrows
  - Relations ended: —

- Canada
  - Consulate:
  - Recognized: 1927
  - Relations established: 1927
  - Legation/embassy established: 1927
  - First ambassador: William Phillips
  - Relations ended: —
  - Notes:
1. Until 1926 Canada was a part of the British Empire, with its foreign relations managed by the British Foreign Office.

- Cape Verde
  - Consulate:
  - Recognized: 1975
  - Relations established: 1975
  - Legation/embassy established: 1978
  - First ambassador: Melissa F. Wells (1976)
  - Relations ended: —
  - Notes:
1. Until 1983 one ambassador was accredited to Guinea-Bissau and Cape Verde while resident at Bissau. In 1983 the first ambassador was appointed solely accredited to Cape Verde.

- Central African Republic
  - Consulate:
  - Recognized: 1960
  - Relations established: 1960
  - Legation/embassy established: 1961
  - First ambassador: W. Wendell Blancke
  - Relations ended: —
  - Notes:
1. Ambassador Blancke was commissioned to the Central African Republic, Chad, the Republic of the Congo, and Gabon, while resident in Brazzaville.

- Central America, Federal Republic of
  - Consulate:
  - Recognized: 1824
  - Relations established: 1824
  - Legation/embassy established: 1826
  - First ambassador: John Williams
  - Relations ended: 1840
  - Notes:
1. The Federal Republic of Central America (República Federal de Centroamérica) was a short-lived union of the present-day states of Guatemala, El Salvador, Honduras, Nicaragua, and Costa Rica. Later Los Altos was added, with its capital in Quetzaltenango – occupying parts of what are now the western highlands of Guatemala and Chiapas state in southern Mexico. The federation was founded in 1823, effectively dissolved in 1840, and formally ended in 1841.
2. The federation dissolved by 1840, although the last diplomatic agent, William Sumter Murphy, did not leave his post until 1842.
3. Between 1844 and 1853, the U.S. government recognized the individual members of the federation.

- Chad
  - Consulate:
  - Recognized: 1960
  - Relations established: 1960
  - Legation/embassy established: 1961
  - First ambassador: W. Wendell Blancke
  - Relations ended: —
  - Notes:
1. Ambassador Blancke was commissioned to the Central African Republic, Chad, the Republic of the Congo, and Gabon, while resident in Brazzaville.
2. The U.S. Embassy N'Djamena was closed 1980–82 due to war, although diplomatic relations were not broken.

- Chile
  - Consulate:
  - Recognized: 1823
  - Relations established: 1824
  - Legation/embassy established: 1824
  - First ambassador: Heman Allen
  - Relations ended: —

- China
  - see History of China–United States relations to 1948
  - see China–United States relations for recent history
  - Consulate:
  - Recognized: 1844
  - Relations established: 1844
  - Legation/embassy established: 1844
  - First ambassador: Caleb Cushing
  - Relations ended: —
  - Notes:
1. 1949: The U.S. embassy moved to Taipei, Formosa, when the Nationalist government of China fled to Formosa.
2. 1973: The U.S. Liaison Office opened in Beijing.
3. 1979: The U.S. withdrew diplomatic recognition from the Nationalist government in Taipei and recognized the PRC government in Beijing. The U.S. continues to provide unofficial relations with Taiwan. (see also Taiwan–United States relations).

- Colombia
  - Consulate: 1823
  - Recognized: 1822
  - Relations established: 1822
  - Legation/embassy established: 1823
  - First ambassador: Richard Clough Anderson, Jr.
  - Relations ended: —

- Comoros
  - Consulate:
  - Recognized: 1977
  - Relations established: 1977
  - Legation/embassy established: 1985
  - First ambassador: Fernando Enrique Rondon
  - Relations ended: —
  - Notes:
1. The U.S. Ambassador to Madagascar is also accredited to the Comoros while resident in Antananarivo.
2. The American Embassy at Moroni was closed in 1993. Subsequent U.S. ambassadors to the Comoros also have been accredited to Mauritius, and resident at Port Louis.

- Congo Free State
  - Consulate:
  - Recognized: 1885
  - Relations established: —
  - Legation/embassy established: —
  - First ambassador: —
  - Relations ended: 1908
  - Notes:
1. The U.S. recognized the Congo Free State as the Independent State of Congo. The U.S. and the Congo Free State never established diplomatic relations. The Congo Free State was annexed as a colony by Belgium in 1908, which ended its existence as an independent sovereign state.

- Congo, Democratic Republic of (Kinshasa)
  - Consulate:
  - Recognized: 1960
  - Relations established: 1960
  - Legation/embassy established: 1960
  - First ambassador: Clare H. Timberlake
  - Relations ended: —

- Congo, Republic of (Brazzaville)
  - Consulate:
  - Recognized: 1960
  - Relations established: 1960
  - Legation/embassy established: 1960
  - First ambassador: W. Wendell Blancke
  - Relations ended: —
  - Notes:
1. Ambassador Blancke was commissioned to the Central African Republic, Chad, the Republic of the Congo, and Gabon, while resident in Brazzaville.
2. Diplomatic relations between the Republic of the Congo and the U.S. were suspended in 1965 and restored in 1977.

- Cook Islands
  - Consulate:
  - Recognized: 2023
  - Relations established: 2023
  - Legation/embassy established:
  - First ambassador:
  - Relations ended: —

- Costa Rica
  - Consulate:
  - Recognized: 1849
  - Relations established: 1855
  - Legation/embassy established: 1898
  - First ambassador: Solon Borland/Mirabeau B. Lamar
  - Relations ended: —
  - Notes:
1. Ambassador Borland was commissioned to Costa Rica but never presented credentials there.
2. Ambassador Lamar was the first official ambassador, having presented his credentials in 1858. Lamar was accredited to Nicaragua and Costa Rica while resident in Managua.
3. Diplomatic relations were interrupted in 1917, following a military coup d’état. Relations were resumed in 1920.

- Ivory Coast
  - Consulate:
  - Recognized: 1960
  - Relations established: 1960
  - Legation/embassy established: 1960
  - First ambassador: R. Borden Reams
  - Relations ended: —
  - Notes:
1. Ambassador Reams was commissioned to Dahomey, Ivory Coast, Niger, and Upper Volta while resident in Abidjan.

- Croatia
  - Consulate:
  - Recognized: 1992
  - Relations established: 1992
  - Legation/embassy established: 1992
  - First ambassador: Peter W. Galbraith (1993)
  - Relations ended: —

- Cuba
  - Consulate: 1787 (Havana)
  - Recognized: 1902
  - Relations established: 1902
  - Legation/embassy established: 1902
  - First ambassador: Herbert G. Squiers
  - Relations ended: 1961
  - Relations re-established: 2015
  - Notes:
1. The United States severed diplomatic relations with Cuba on January 3, 1961.
2. From September 1, 1977 to July 20, 2015 United States interests were represented by the United States Interests Section of the Embassy of Switzerland in Havana, and Cuba by the Republic of Cuba Interests Section of the Embassy of Czechoslovakia from 1977 to 1991. Following the end of communist rule in Czechoslovakia, Switzerland became the protecting power of Cuba in the United States.
3. The United States opened again the diplomatic relations with Cuba on August 14, 2015.

- Cyprus
  - Consulate:
  - Recognized: 1960
  - Relations established: 1960
  - Legation/embassy established: 1960
  - First ambassador: Fraser Wilkins
  - Relations ended: —

- Czechoslovakia
  - Consulate: 1869
  - Recognized: 1918
  - Relations established: 1918
  - Legation/embassy established: 1919
  - First ambassador: Richard Crane
  - Relations ended: 1992
  - Notes:
1. 1941–45: During WWII, the U.S. maintained diplomatic relations with the government-in-exile of Czechoslovakia in London.
2. Relations with Czechoslovakia ended in 1992 with the dissolution of the nation into the Czech Republic and Slovakia.

- Czech Republic
  - Consulate:
  - Recognized: 1993
  - Relations established: 1993
  - Legation/embassy established: 1993
  - First ambassador: Adrian A. Basora
  - Relations ended: —
  - Notes:
1. Ambassador Basora had been the U.S. ambassador to Czechoslovakia and continued as ambassador to the Czech Republic.

- Denmark
  - Consulate: 1792
  - Recognized: 1792
  - Relations established: 1801
  - Legation/embassy established: 1827
  - First ambassador: Henry Wheaton
  - Relations ended: —
  - Notes:

- Djibouti
  - Consulate:
  - Recognized: 1977
  - Relations established: 1977
  - Legation/embassy established: 1977
  - First ambassador: Jerrold M. North (1980)
  - Relations ended: —

- Dominica
  - Consulate:
  - Recognized: 1978
  - Relations established: 1979
  - Legation/embassy established: —
  - First ambassador: Sally Angela Shelton (Sally Shelton-Colby)
  - Relations ended: —
  - Notes:
1. The U.S. does not maintain an embassy in Dominica. The U.S. Ambassador in Barbados in Bridgetown is also accredited to Dominica.

- Dominican Republic
  - Consulate:
  - Recognized: 1866
  - Relations established: 1884
  - Legation/embassy established: 1904
  - First ambassador: Thomas Cleland Dawson
  - Relations ended: —
  - Notes:
1. A series of chargés d’affaires represented the U.S. at the embassy in Santo Domingo until the first minister resident/consul general was appointed in 1904.
2. Until 1904 the U.S. Minister to Haiti was also accredited as the Chargé d’Affaires to the Dominican Republic.

- East Timor – see Timor-Leste

- Ecuador
  - Consulate: 1825
  - Recognized: 1832
  - Relations established: 1848
  - Legation/embassy established: 1848
  - First ambassador: Philo White (1853)
  - Relations ended: —
  - Notes:
1. A series of chargés d’affaires represented the U.S. at the embassy in Quito until the first minister resident was appointed in 1853.

- Egypt
  - Consulate:
  - Recognized: 1922
  - Relations established: 1922
  - Legation/embassy established: 1922
  - First ambassador: J. Morton Howell
  - Relations ended: —
  - Notes:
1. Starting in 1849, while Egypt was part of the Ottoman Empire, the US maintained a "consular and quasi-diplomatic presence" there. The first "Agent and Consul General" was Daniel Smith McCauley.
2. Egypt became independent in 1922.
3. Egypt and Syria united to form a new state, the United Arab Republic (UAR), in 1958. The U.S. recognized the UAR immediately. The U.S. embassy in Damascus was reclassified as a consulate general. Syria seceded from the union in 1961; however, Egypt continued to be known officially as the United Arab Republic until 1971.
4. Egypt severed diplomatic relations with the U.S. during the Six-Day War. Normal relations were restored in 1974. During the interruption of relations, the U.S. was represented by a U.S. Interests Section in the Embassy of Spain.

- El Salvador
  - Consulate:
  - Recognized: 1849
  - Relations established: 1863
  - Legation/embassy established: 1863
  - First ambassador: James R. Partridge
  - Relations ended: —
  - Notes:
1. Diplomatic relations were handled through the Greater Republic of Central America 1896–98.
2. Relations were interrupted on December 4, 1931, when the U.S. did not recognize the new revolutionary government of El Salvador. Normal relations were resumed in 1934.

- Equatorial Guinea
  - Consulate:
  - Recognized: 1968
  - Relations established: 1968
  - Legation/embassy established: 1969
  - First ambassador: Albert W. Sherer, Jr.
  - Relations ended: —
  - Notes:
1. The U.S. suspended diplomatic relations with Equatorial Guinea in 1976 after the U.S. ambassador and consul had been declared personae non gratae. Normal relations were resumed in 1979.
2. The U.S. embassy in Malabo was closed in 1995, and its functions transferred to the embassy in Yaoundé, Cameroon. The ambassador to Cameroon was also accredited to Equatorial Guinea while resident in Yaoundé. The embassy in Malabo was reopened in 2004 with the ambassador solely accredited to Equatorial Guinea.

- Eritrea
  - Consulate:
  - Recognized: 1993
  - Relations established: 1993
  - Legation/embassy established: 1993
  - First ambassador: Robert Gordon Houdek
  - Relations ended: —

- Estonia (1)
  - Consulate:
  - Recognized: 1922
  - Relations established: 1922
  - Legation/embassy established: 1922
  - First ambassador: Robert P. Skinner
  - Relations ended: 1940
  - Notes:
1. The first ambassadors were accredited to Estonia, Latvia, and Lithuania, while resident in Riga, Latvia.
2. The legation in Tallinn was closed in 1940, following the Soviet occupation of the Baltic states. The U.S. never recognized the government of Estonia under Soviet occupation.

- Estonia (2)
  - Consulate:
  - Recognized: 1991
  - Relations established: 1991
  - Legation/embassy established: 1991
  - First ambassador: Robert C. Frasure
  - Relations ended: —
  - Notes:
1. The U.S. recognized the government of Estonia in 1991 after the collapse of the Soviet Union, reestablished diplomatic relations, and reopened the old legation in Tallinn as an embassy.

- Ethiopia
  - Consulate:
  - Recognized: 1903
  - Relations established: 1903
  - Legation/embassy established: 1909
  - First ambassador: Hoffman Philip
  - Relations ended: —
  - Notes:
1. The U.S. Legation in Addis Ababa was closed and diplomatic personnel were withdrawn following the Italian occupation of Ethiopia in 1937. The U.S. never recognized Italian authority in Ethiopia. The legation was reopened and a new Minister Resident/Consul was appointed in 1943.
2. In July 1980, the U.S. ambassador to Ethiopia was recalled at the request of the Ethiopian government, and the U.S. Embassy in Ethiopia and the Ethiopian Embassy in the United States were headed by chargés d’affaires until 1993.

- Fiji
  - Consulate: 1844
  - Recognized: 1970
  - Relations established: 1971
  - Legation/embassy established: 1971
  - First ambassador: Kenneth Franzheim II
  - Relations ended: —
  - Notes:
1. The first ambassadors were accredited to New Zealand, Fiji, and Tonga, while resident at Wellington, New Zealand.
2. The first ambassador resident in Suva, Fiji, was appointed in 1978. He was also accredited to Tonga and Tuvalu.

- Finland
  - Consulate:
  - Recognized: 1919
  - Relations established: 1919
  - Legation/embassy established: 1920
  - First ambassador: Charles L. Kagey (1921)
  - Relations ended: —
  - Notes:
1. The U.S. severed diplomatic relations with Finland on 1944, as result of Finland's alliance with Germany against the Soviet Union. Relations were re-established in 1945.

- France
  - Consulate: 1778
  - Recognized: 1778
  - Relations established: 1778
  - Legation/embassy established: 1779
  - First ambassador: Benjamin Franklin
  - Relations ended: —
  - Notes:
1. Diplomatic relations with France were severed in 1798 as a result of the XYZ Affair. Relations were restored in 1801.
2. U.S.–France diplomatic relations were severed in 1942 at the direction of the French Vichy government. The U.S. recognized the Provisional Government of the French Republic in Algiers in 1944. Normal diplomatic relations with France were restored, and the U.S. embassy in Paris was reopened in December 1944.

- Gabon
  - Consulate:
  - Recognized: 1960
  - Relations established: 1960
  - Legation/embassy established: 1961
  - First ambassador: W. Wendell Blancke
  - Relations ended: —
  - Notes:
1. Ambassador Blancke was commissioned to the Central African Republic, Chad, the Republic of the Congo, and Gabon, while resident in Brazzaville.

- Gambia, The
  - Consulate:
  - Recognized: 1965
  - Relations established: 1965
  - Legation/embassy established: 1965
  - First ambassador: Mercer Cook
  - Relations ended: —

- Genoa, Republic of
  - Consulate: 1791
  - Recognized: 1791
  - Relations established: —
  - Legation/embassy established: —
  - First ambassador: —
  - Relations ended: 1805
  - Notes:
1. The Republic of Genoa recognized the U.S. in 1791. There is no clear record of reciprocation by the U.S., but President Washington accredited the Republic's Consul General in 1791. The U.S. and the Republic never established diplomatic relations. Genoa was annexed by France in 1805 and ceased to exist.

- Georgia
  - Consulate:
  - Recognized: 1991
  - Relations established: 1992
  - Legation/embassy established: 1992
  - First ambassador: Kent N. Brown
  - Relations ended: —

- German Confederation
  - Consulate:
  - Recognized: 1848
  - Relations established: 1848
  - Legation/embassy established: 1848
  - First ambassador: Andrew J. Donelson
  - Relations ended: 1867
  - Notes:
1. The short-lived German Confederation was absorbed into the North German Confederation in 1867.
- German Confederation, North
  - Consulate:
  - Recognized: 1867
  - Relations established: 1868
  - Legation/embassy established: —
  - First ambassador: George Bancroft
  - Relations ended: 1871
  - Notes:
1. Ambassador Bancroft was also the ambassador to Prussia.
2. The North German Union was abolished by the creation of the German Empire in 1871.

- Germany (Prussia)
  - Consulate:
  - Recognized: 1797
  - Relations established: 1797
  - Legation/embassy established: 1797
  - First ambassador: John Quincy Adams
  - Relations ended: 1871
  - Notes:
1. Prussia became part of the German Empire in 1871.

- Germany (German Empire)
  - Consulate: 1871
  - Recognized: 1871
  - Relations established: 1871
  - Legation/embassy established: 1871
  - First ambassador: George Bancroft
  - Relations ended: 1917
  - Notes:
1. The U.S. severed diplomatic relations with the German Empire in 1917. The U.S. declared war on Germany shortly thereafter.

- Germany (1918–1941)
  - Consulate:
  - Recognized: 1921
  - Relations established: 1921
  - Legation/embassy established: 1921
  - First ambassador: Alanson B. Houghton
  - Relations ended: 1941
  - Notes:
1. Diplomatic relations with the Germany were broken off when Germany declared war on the U.S. in December 1941.
2. Mutual recognition between the U.S. and Germany was established by the Treaty of Berlin in 1921.

- Germany, East (German Democratic Republic)
  - Consulate:
  - Recognized: 1974
  - Relations established: 1974
  - Legation/embassy established: 1974
  - First ambassador: John Sherman Cooper
  - Relations ended: 1990
  - Notes:
1. The German Democratic Republic ceased to exist on October 3, 1990, when it was absorbed into the Federal Republic of Germany (West Germany).

- Germany
  - Consulate:
  - Recognized: 1949
  - Relations established: 1955
  - Legation/embassy established: 1955
  - First ambassador: James Bryant Conant
  - Relations ended: —
  - Notes:
1. The U.S. embassy in Bonn moved to Berlin in 1999.

- Ghana
  - Consulate:
  - Recognized: 1957
  - Relations established: 1957
  - Legation/embassy established: 1957
  - First ambassador: Peter Rutter
  - Relations ended: —
  - Notes:
1. Ghana was known as Gold Coast until independence in 1957.

- Greece
  - Consulate: 1837
  - Recognized: 1837
  - Relations established: 1868
  - Legation/embassy established: 1868
  - First ambassador: Charles K. Tuckerman
  - Relations ended: —
  - Notes:
1. The U.S. Embassy in Athens was closed in 1941 after the German occupation of Greece, and reopened in 1944. During wartime the U.S. maintained diplomatic relations with the government-in-exile of Greece in London (1941–43) and then in Cairo (1943–44).

- Grenada
  - Consulate:
  - Recognized: 1975
  - Relations established: 1974
  - Legation/embassy established: 1984
  - First ambassador: Theodore R. Britton, Jr.
  - Relations ended: —
  - Notes:
1. The ambassador to Grenada is accredited to Grenada and Barbados, while resident at Bridgetown, Barbados.

- Guatemala
  - Consulate:
  - Recognized: 1844
  - Relations established: 1849
  - Legation/embassy established: 1849
  - First ambassador: Solon Borland (1855)
  - Relations ended: —
  - Notes:
1. The U.S. had previously recognized Guatemala in 1824 as a part of the Federal Republic of Central America.
2. A series of chargés d’affaires represented the U.S. until 1855.
3. Relations with Guatemala were interrupted briefly in June 1954, following a coup d’état. In July the U.S. recognized the new government and re-established diplomatic relations.

- Guinea
  - Consulate:
  - Recognized: 1958
  - Relations established: 1959
  - Legation/embassy established: 1959
  - First ambassador: John H. Morrow
  - Relations ended: —

- Guinea-Bissau
  - Consulate:
  - Recognized: 1974
  - Relations established: 1975
  - Legation/embassy established: 1976
  - First ambassador: Melissa F. Wells
  - Relations ended: —

- Guyana
  - Consulate:
  - Recognized: 1966
  - Relations established: 1966
  - Legation/embassy established: 1966
  - First ambassador: Delmar R. Carlson
  - Relations ended: —

- Haiti
  - Consulate:
  - Recognized: 1862
  - Relations established: 1862
  - Legation/embassy established: 1862
  - First ambassador: Benjamin F. Whidden
  - Relations ended: —
  - Notes:
1. Whidden's title was Commissioner and Consul General. The first Minister was Henry E. Peck in 1866.
2. Until 1904 the minister to Haiti was also accredited as the chargé d’affaires to the Dominican Republic.

- Hanover, Kingdom of
  - Consulate:
  - Recognized: 1830
  - Relations established: —
  - Legation/embassy established: —
  - First ambassador: —
  - Relations ended: 1866
  - Notes:
1. The U.S. never established diplomatic relations with the Kingdom of Hanover. The Kingdom was conquered by Prussia in 1866 and ceased to exist.

- Hanseatic Republics (Bremen, Lübeck, Hamburg)
  - Consulate: 1794
  - Recognized: 1790–94
  - Relations established: 1853
  - Legation/embassy established: —
  - First ambassador: —
  - Relations ended: 1868
  - Notes:
1. No U.S. minister or envoy was appointed; only consuls were appointed. Relations with the Hanseatic Republics ended in 1868 when the republics joined the North German Confederation.

- Hawaii
  - Consulate: 1820
  - Recognized: 1826
  - Relations established: 1853
  - Legation/embassy established: 1853
  - First ambassador: David L. Gregg
  - Relations ended: 1898
  - Notes:
1. Gregg's title was Commissioner to the Kingdom of Hawaii. Gregg's predecessors were titled Commissioner to the Sandwich Islands. The office was not titled Legation until 1853.
2. In 1863 the rank of the Commissioner was raised to Minister Resident with the appointment of James McBride.
3. The Kingdom was overthrown in 1893 and a republic declared in 1894.
4. Diplomatic relations with Hawaii ended in 1898 when Hawaii was annexed to the United States.

- Hesse
  - Consulate: 1829
  - Recognized: 1829
  - Relations established: 1829
  - Legation/embassy established: —
  - First ambassador: —
  - Relations ended: 1917
  - Notes:
1. George Bancroft, who was the minister to Prussia, was given special accreditation to Hesse.
2. Hesse joined the German Empire in 1871. Diplomatic relations with the German Empire were broken upon entry of the U.S. into WWI in 1917.

- Holy See (see also Papal States)
  - Consulate: 1797
  - Recognized: 1984
  - Relations established: 1984
  - Legation/embassy established: 1984
  - First ambassador: William A. Wilson
  - Relations ended: —
  - Notes:
1. The U.S. maintained consular relations with the Papal States 1797–1870.
2. The U.S. has been represented at the Holy See since the early 20th century. Previous representatives had been titled Personal Representative of the President.

- Honduras
  - Consulate:
  - Recognized: 1853
  - Relations established: 1853
  - Legation/embassy established: 1856
  - First ambassador: Solon Borland
  - Relations ended: —
  - Notes:
1. Honduras had been recognized in 1824 as part of the Federal Republic of Central America. It was recognized independently in 1853.
2. Ambassador Borland was accredited to Honduras, Costa Rica, Nicaragua, and El Salvador, but he did not present his credentials in Tegucigalpa.

- Hungary
  - Consulate: 1869
  - Recognized: 1921
  - Relations established: 1921
  - Legation/embassy established: 1921
  - First ambassador: Theodore Brentano (1922)
  - Relations ended: —
  - Notes:
1. Hungary severed diplomatic relations on December 11, 1941, and declared war on the U.S. on December 13. Relations were restored in January 1945.
2. Diplomatic relations were interrupted in 1956, following the Soviet suppression of the Hungarian Revolution of 1956. From 1957 until 1967, no ambassador was commissioned to Hungary, but a series of chargés d’affaires represented the U.S.

- Iceland
  - Consulate:
  - Recognized: 1944
  - Relations established: 1941
  - Legation/embassy established: 1941
  - First ambassador: Lincoln MacVeagh
  - Relations ended: —
  - Notes:
1. Iceland had been occupied by the U.S. since 1941, at the request of the Icelandic government, in order to forestall a feared German occupation.

- India
  - Consulate: 1792
  - Recognized: 1947
  - Relations established: 1946
  - Legation/embassy established: 1946
  - First ambassador: Henry F. Grady
  - Relations ended: —
  - Notes:
1. The U.S. established diplomatic relations and an embassy in 1946, in anticipation of Indian independence in 1947.

- Indonesia
  - Consulate: 1801
  - Recognized: 1949
  - Relations established: 1949
  - Legation/embassy established: 1949
  - First ambassador: Horace M. Cochran
  - Relations ended: —

- Iran
  - Consulate:
  - Recognized: 1850
  - Relations established: 1883
  - Legation/embassy established: 1883
  - First ambassador: Frederick H. Winston (1885)
  - Relations ended: 1980
  - Notes:
1. Bayless W. Hanna had been appointed as the first Minister Resident to Persia and took the oath of office, but did not proceed to Persia.
2. The U.S. severed diplomatic relations with Iran on April 7, 1980 following the Iran hostage crisis.

- Iraq
  - Consulate: 1888
  - Recognized: 1930
  - Relations established: 1931
  - Legation/embassy established: 1931
  - First ambassador: Paul Knabenshue
  - Relations ended: —
  - Notes:
1. Iraq severed diplomatic relations with the U.S. in June 1967 during the 1967 Arab-Israeli Six-Day War. Relations were reestablished in 1984. A U.S. Interests Section was established in the Belgian Embassy in Baghdad in 1972 in the interim.
2. The U.S. and Iraq mutually severed relations in 1991 following the Invasion of Kuwait. Diplomatic relations between the U.S. and Iraq were reestablished and the U.S. Embassy was reopened in 2004.

- Ireland
  - Consulate:
  - Recognized: 1924
  - Relations established: 1924
  - Legation/embassy established: 1927
  - First ambassador: Frederick A. Sterling
  - Relations ended: —

- Israel
  - Consulate:
  - Recognized: 1948
  - Relations established: 1949
  - Legation/embassy established: 1949
  - First ambassador: James Grover McDonald
  - Relations ended: —

- Italy
  - Consulate: 1794
  - Recognized: 1861
  - Relations established: 1861
  - Legation/embassy established: 1861
  - First ambassador: George Perkins Marsh
  - Relations ended: —
  - Notes:
1. The U.S. maintained consulates in numerous Italian cities beginning in 1794.
2. The U.S. Legation was initially at Turin, then at Florence, and finally moved to Rome in 1871.
3. Diplomatic relations were severed and the American Embassy in Rome was closed on December 11, 1941, after Italy declared war on the United States. Relations were reestablished in 1944 and the embassy was reopened in 1945.

- Jamaica
  - Consulate:
  - Recognized: 1962
  - Relations established: 1962
  - Legation/embassy established: 1962
  - First ambassador: William C. Doherty
  - Relations ended: —
  - Notes:
1. Ambassador Vincent de Roulet was declared persona non grata in 1973 and he was expelled.

- Japan
  - Consulate: 1855
  - Recognized: 1854
  - Relations established: 1858
  - Legation/embassy established: 1859
  - First ambassador: Townsend Harris
  - Relations ended: —
  - Notes:
1. Diplomatic relations between Japan and the United States were mutually severed on December 8, 1941, when both nations declared war on each other in the wake of Japan's attack on Pearl Harbor. Normal diplomatic relations were resumed and the U.S. Embassy was reopened in Tokyo in 1952.

- Jordan
  - Consulate:
  - Recognized: 1949
  - Relations established: 1949
  - Legation/embassy established: 1949
  - First ambassador: Gerald A. Drew (1950)
  - Relations ended: —

- Kazakhstan
  - Consulate:
  - Recognized: 1991
  - Relations established: 1992
  - Legation/embassy established: 1992
  - First ambassador: William Harrison Courtney
  - Relations ended: —

- Kenya
  - Consulate:
  - Recognized: 1963
  - Relations established: 1964
  - Legation/embassy established: 1964
  - First ambassador: William Attwood
  - Relations ended: —

- Kiribati
  - Consulate:
  - Recognized: 1979
  - Relations established: 1980
  - Legation/embassy established: —
  - First ambassador: William Bodde, Jr.
  - Relations ended: —
  - Notes:
1. The first ambassadors were accredited to Fiji, Tonga, Tuvalu, and Kiribati, while resident at Suva, Fiji. There is no U.S. embassy in Kiribati.

- Korea
  - Consulate:
  - Recognized: 1882
  - Relations established: 1882
  - Legation/embassy established: 1883
  - First ambassador: Lucius H. Foote
  - Relations ended: 1910
  - Notes:
1. Relations between Korea and the U.S. were established by the Chemulpo Treaty of 1882. Japan annexed Korea in 1910 and relations between the U.S. and Korea were interrupted.

- Korea, North (Democratic People's Republic of Korea)
  - Consulate:
  - Recognized: —
  - Relations established: —
  - Legation/embassy established: —
  - First ambassador: —
  - Relations ended: —
  - Notes:
1. At the end of WWII, Korea was split into North and South along the 38th parallel. The Republic of Korea (South Korea) was established in 1948. The U.S. recognized South Korea in 1949 and established diplomatic relations, but never recognized the government of North Korea.

- Korea, South (Republic of Korea)
  - Consulate:
  - Recognized: 1949
  - Relations established: 1949
  - Legation/embassy established: 1949
  - First ambassador: John J. Muccio
  - Relations ended: —
1. At the end of WWII, Korea was split into North and South along the 38th parallel. The Republic of Korea (South Korea) was established in 1948. The U.S. recognized South Korea in 1949 and established diplomatic relations, but never recognized the government of North Korea.

- Kosovo
  - Consulate:
  - Recognized: 2008
  - Relations established: 2008
  - Legation/embassy established: 2008
  - First ambassador: Tina S. Kaidanow
  - Relations ended: —

- Kuwait
  - Consulate: 1951
  - Recognized: 1961
  - Relations established: 1961
  - Legation/embassy established: 1961
  - First ambassador: Parker T. Hart
  - Relations ended: —
  - Notes:
1. The U.S. Embassy in Kuwait was closed and diplomatic staff were withdrawn in December 1990 due to the Iraqi invasion of Kuwait. The embassy was reopened in March 1991.

- Kyrgyzstan
  - Consulate:
  - Recognized: 1991
  - Relations established: 1991
  - Legation/embassy established: 1992
  - First ambassador: Edward Hurwitz
  - Relations ended: —

- Laos
  - Consulate: 1950
  - Recognized: 1950
  - Relations established: 1950
  - Legation/embassy established: 1950
  - First ambassador: Donald R. Heath
  - Relations ended: —
  - Notes:
1. Ambassador Heath was concurrently commissioned to Vietnam and Laos, while resident at Saigon. The first resident ambassador was Charles Woodruff Yost in 1954.
2. In 1975, after the establishment of the Communist Lao People's Democratic Republic, the U.S. recalled the ambassador. A series of chargés d’affaires represented the U.S. in Vientiane until 1992 when Charles B. Salmon was appointed ambassador.

- Latvia (1)
  - Consulate:
  - Recognized: 1922
  - Relations established: 1922
  - Legation/embassy established: 1922
  - First ambassador: Frederick W. B. Coleman
  - Relations ended: 1940
  - Notes:
1. The first ambassadors were accredited to Latvia, Estonia, and Lithuania, while resident in Riga, Latvia.
2. The U.S. Legation in Riga was closed in 1940 following the Soviet invasion and annexation of the Baltic states. The U.S. government allowed Latvian diplomats to remain in the U.S. and maintained the position that they were the legal representatives of the Latvian government. The U.S. never recognized the Latvian government under the Soviet Union.

- Latvia (2)
  - Consulate:
  - Recognized: 1991
  - Relations established: 1991
  - Legation/embassy established: 1991
  - First ambassador: Ints M. Silins
  - Relations ended: —
  - Notes:
1. In 1991, after the collapse of the Soviet Union, the U.S. recognized Latvia's independence, restored diplomatic relations, and reopened the embassy.

- Lebanon
  - Consulate: 1942
  - Recognized: 1944
  - Relations established: 1944
  - Legation/embassy established: 1944
  - First ambassador: George Wadsworth
  - Relations ended: —
  - Notes:
1. Ambassador Wadsworth had been serving in Lebanon as Diplomatic Agent/Consul General since 1942. He was promoted to Envoy Extraordinary and Minister Plenipotentiary upon establishment of U.S.–Syria diplomatic relations. He was concurrently commissioned to Lebanon and Syria, while resident in Beirut.
2. The U.S. withdrew all diplomatic personnel and closed the embassy in 1989 due to safety concerns during the Lebanon civil war. The embassy was reopened in 1990 with Ryan Crocker as ambassador.

- Lesotho
  - Consulate:
  - Recognized: 1966
  - Relations established: 1966
  - Legation/embassy established: 1966
  - First ambassador: Charles J. Nelson (1971)
  - Relations ended: —
  - Notes:
1. Until 1979 one ambassador was accredited to Lesotho, Swaziland, and Botswana while resident in Gaborone, Botswana.

- Lew Chew (Ryūkyū Kingdom)
  - Consulate:
  - Recognized: 1854
  - Relations established: —
  - Legation/embassy established: —
  - First ambassador: —
  - Relations ended: 1879
  - Notes:
1. The U.S. never established diplomatic relations with the kingdom. Lew Chew was annexed by Japan in 1879 and ceased to exist as a sovereign state.

- Liberia
  - Consulate:
  - Recognized: 1862
  - Relations established: 1864
  - Legation/embassy established: 1864
  - First ambassador: Abraham Hanson (Commissioner and Consul General)
  - Relations ended: —
  - Notes:
1. The first representative, Hanson, was titled Commissioner and Consul General. The next envoy was given the title Minister Resident/Consul General.

- Libya
  - Consulate:
  - Recognized: 1951
  - Relations established: 1951
  - Legation/embassy established: 1951
  - First ambassador: Henry Serrano Villard (1952)
  - Relations ended: —
  - Notes:
1. No U.S. ambassador had been appointed to Libya since Joseph Palmer left his post in 1972. A series of chargés d’affaires represented the U.S. until 1980. The U.S. and Libya closed their embassies in 1980 and 1981, respectively, but diplomatic relations were not formally severed. In 2006 the U.S. and Libya formally resumed diplomatic relations. Gene Cretz was appointed ambassador in 2008.

- Liechtenstein
  - Consulate:
  - Recognized: 1926
  - Relations established: 1997
  - Legation/embassy established: —
  - First ambassador: Madeleine M. Kunin
  - Relations ended: —
  - Notes:
1. Liechtenstein was represented in foreign affairs by Switzerland until 1997. The U.S. ambassador to Switzerland is also accredited to Liechtenstein, while resident in Bern.

- Lithuania (1)
  - Consulate:
  - Recognized: 1922
  - Relations established: 1922
  - Legation/embassy established: 1922
  - First ambassador: Frederick W.B. Coleman
  - Relations ended: 1940
  - Notes:
1. The first ambassadors to Lithuania were accredited to Latvia, Lithuania, and Estonia, while resident in Riga, Latvia.
2. The U.S. Legation was closed in August 1940 following the Soviet invasion and annexation of the Baltic states. The U.S. government allowed Lithuanian diplomats to remain in the U.S. and maintained the position that they were the legal representatives of the Lithuanian government. The U.S. never recognized the Lithuanian government under the Soviet Union.

- Lithuania (2)
  - Consulate:
  - Recognized: 1991
  - Relations established: 1991
  - Legation/embassy established: 1991
  - First ambassador: Darryl N. Johnson
  - Relations ended: —
  - Notes:
1. Following the collapse of the Soviet Union in 1991, The U.S. recognized the Lithuanian government, resumed diplomatic relations, and reopened the embassy in Vilnius.

- Luxembourg
  - Consulate:
  - Recognized: 1878
  - Relations established: 1903
  - Legation/embassy established: 1903
  - First ambassador: Stanford Newel
  - Relations ended: —
  - Notes:
1. The first ambassador was accredited to the Netherlands and Luxembourg, while resident at The Hague, Netherlands.
2. In 1940 the U.S. Legation in Luxembourg was closed following the German occupation of Luxembourg. The U.S. maintained relations with the government-in-exile of Luxembourg in Ottawa, Ontario, Canada (1941–43) and then in London (1943–44). The U.S. Legation in Luxembourg was reestablished in September 1944.

- Macedonia
  - Consulate:
  - Recognized: 1994
  - Relations established: 1995
  - Legation/embassy established: 1993
  - First ambassador: Christopher R. Hill
  - Relations ended: —

- Madagascar
  - Consulate: 1874
  - Recognized: 1960
  - Relations established: 1960
  - Legation/embassy established: 1960
  - First ambassador: Frederic Pearson Bartlett
  - Relations ended: —
  - Notes:
1. U.S. Ambassador Anthony D. Marshall was expelled in 1971. Another ambassador was appointed the following year.

- Malawi
  - Consulate:
  - Recognized: 1964
  - Relations established: 1964
  - Legation/embassy established: 1964
  - First ambassador: Samuel Patrick Gilstrap
  - Relations ended: —

- Malaysia
  - Consulate: 1918
  - Recognized: 1957
  - Relations established: 1957
  - Legation/embassy established: 1957
  - First ambassador: Homer Morrison Byington
  - Relations ended: —
  - Notes:
1. Malaysia was recognized as Federation of Malaya in 1957. In 1963 Malaya joined with Singapore, Sarawak, and Sabah to form the Federation of Malaysia. Henceforth all U.S. ambassadors were accredited to the Federation of Malaysia.

- Maldives
  - Consulate:
  - Recognized: 1965
  - Relations established: 1966
  - Legation/embassy established: —
  - First ambassador: Cecil Burton Lyon
  - Relations ended: —
  - Notes:
1. One ambassador is accredited to the Maldives and Sri Lanka, while resident in Colombo, Sri Lanka. In 1967 the then-current ambassador to Sri Lanka, Cecil B. Lyon, was given an additional commission to the Maldives. There is no U.S. embassy in Malé, Maldives.

- Mali
  - Consulate:
  - Recognized: 1960
  - Relations established: 1960
  - Legation/embassy established: 1960
  - First ambassador: Thomas K. Wright
  - Relations ended: —
  - Notes:
1. Henry Serrano Villard was commissioned to the Federation of Mali in 1960 but the Federation split apart before Villard could proceed to the post. Villard became the ambassador to Senegal.

- Malta
  - Consulate:
  - Recognized: 1964
  - Relations established: 1964
  - Legation/embassy established: 1964
  - First ambassador: George J. Feldman (1965)
  - Relations ended: —

- Marshall Islands
  - Consulate:
  - Recognized: 1979
  - Relations established: 1987
  - Legation/embassy established: 1987
  - First ambassador: William Bodde (1990)
  - Relations ended: —

- Mauritania
  - Consulate:
  - Recognized: 1960
  - Relations established: 1960
  - Legation/embassy established: 1962
  - First ambassador: Henry Serrano Villard
  - Relations ended: —
  - Notes:
1. Mauritania severed diplomatic relations with the United States on June 7, 1967, in the wake of the 1967 Arab-Israeli War, and the U.S. embassy was closed. Relations were resumed in 1969 and Embassy Nouakchott was reopened in 1970.

- Mauritius
  - Consulate:
  - Recognized: 1968
  - Relations established: 1968
  - Legation/embassy established: 1968
  - First ambassador: David S. King
  - Relations ended: —
  - Notes:
1. The first ambassador was concurrently commissioned to Madagascar and Mauritius while resident at Antananarivo, Madagascar.

- Mecklenburg-Schwerin, Grand Duchy of
  - Consulate: 1816
  - Recognized: 1816
  - Relations established: —
  - Legation/embassy established: —
  - First ambassador: —
  - Relations ended: 1867
  - Notes:
1. The United States and the Grand Duchy of Mecklenburg-Schwerin never established diplomatic relations. The Grand Duchy joined the North German Confederation in 1867, thus ending independent foreign relations.

- Mecklenburg-Strelitz, Grand Duchy of
  - Consulate:
  - Recognized: 1853
  - Relations established: —
  - Legation/embassy established: —
  - First ambassador: —
  - Relations ended: 1867
  - Notes:
1. The United States and the Grand Duchy of Mecklenburg-Strelitz never established diplomatic relations. The Grand Duchy joined the North German Confederation in 1867 and ceased to exist as a sovereign state.

- Mexico
  - Consulate:
  - Recognized: 1822
  - Relations established: 1825
  - Legation/embassy established: 1825
  - First ambassador: Joel Roberts Poinsett
  - Relations ended: —
  - Notes:
1. Mexico severed diplomatic relations with the U.S. in 1845 upon the annexation of Texas by the U.S. Relations were reestablished in 1848 following the Treaty of Guadalupe Hidalgo ending the Mexican–American War.
2. Mexico severed diplomatic relations with the U.S. in 1914 following the Tampico Affair. Diplomatic relations were reestablished in 1917.

- Micronesia
  - Consulate:
  - Recognized: 1986
  - Relations established: 1986
  - Legation/embassy established: 1989
  - First ambassador: Aurelia Erskine Brazeal (1990)
  - Relations ended: —

- Moldova
  - Consulate:
  - Recognized: 1991
  - Relations established: 1992
  - Legation/embassy established: 1992
  - First ambassador: Mary C. Pendleton
  - Relations ended: —

- Monaco
  - Consulate: 1874
  - Recognized: 1865
  - Relations established: 2006
  - Legation/embassy established: —
  - First ambassador: Craig Roberts Stapleton
  - Relations ended: —
  - Notes:
1. The U.S. ambassador to France is concurrently accredited to Monaco.

- Mongolia
  - Consulate:
  - Recognized: 1987
  - Relations established: 1987
  - Legation/embassy established: 1988
  - First ambassador: Richard Llewellyn Williams
  - Relations ended: —
  - Notes:
1. Diplomatic relations were established during the late Cold War era with the Mongolian People's Republic and have continued uninterrupted since the 1990 Democratic Revolution in Mongolia.

- Montenegro
  - Consulate:
  - Recognized: 1994
  - Relations established: 1995
  - Legation/embassy established: 1995
  - First ambassador: Christopher R. Hill
  - Relations ended: —

- Morocco
  - Consulate: 1797
  - Recognized: 1786
  - Relations established: 1905
  - Legation/embassy established: 1905
  - First ambassador: Samuel Rene Gummere
  - Relations ended: —
  - Notes:
1. 1912–1956: Morocco came under the control of France and Spain as protectorates. The United States did not initially recognize the French and Spanish protectorates over Morocco. However, in 1917 upon U.S. entry into the First World War, the U.S. government recognized the protectorates. The U.S. Minister at Tangier was downgraded to the status of Diplomatic Agent. In 1956 the U.S. recognized Morocco's independence, established an embassy in Rabat, and appointed a ranking ambassador, Cavendish W. Cannon.

- Mozambique
  - Consulate:
  - Recognized: 1975
  - Relations established: 1975
  - Legation/embassy established: 1975
  - First ambassador: Willard Ames De Pree (1976)
  - Relations ended: —

- Myanmar (see Burma)

- Namibia
  - Consulate:
  - Recognized: 1990
  - Relations established: 1990
  - Legation/embassy established: 1990
  - First ambassador: Willard Ames De Pree
  - Relations ended: —

- Nassau, Duchy of
  - Consulate: 1853
  - Recognized: 1846
  - Relations established: —
  - Legation/embassy established: —
  - First ambassador: —
  - Relations ended: 1866
  - Notes:
1. The U.S. and the Duchy of Nassau never established formal diplomatic relations. As a result of the Austro-Prussian War, the Duchy was absorbed into the Kingdom of Prussia in 1866 and ceased to exist as a sovereign state.

- Nauru
  - Consulate:
  - Recognized: 1974
  - Relations established: 1974
  - Legation/embassy established: —
  - First ambassador: Marshall Green
  - Relations ended: —
  - Notes:
1. The first ambassador to Nauru, Marshall Green, was concurrently accredited to Australia and Nauru, while resident at Canberra.

- Nepal
  - Consulate:
  - Recognized: 1947
  - Relations established: 1947
  - Legation/embassy established: 1959
  - First ambassador: Henry F. Grady
  - Relations ended: —
  - Notes:
1. 1947–1959: The first US ambassadors to India were concurrently commissioned to India and Nepal, while resident in New Delhi. In 1959 an embassy was opened in Kathmandu with an ambassador solely commissioned to Nepal.

- Netherlands
  - Consulate: 1798
  - Recognized: 1781
  - Relations established: 1781
  - Legation/embassy established: 1781
  - First ambassador: John Adams
  - Relations ended: —
  - Notes:
1. Adams was concurrently commissioned to the U. K. and the Netherlands, while resident in London.
2. In 1801 The U.S. closed the legation in The Hague and withdrew the ambassador. The embassy was reopened and another ambassador was commissioned in 1814 when the Netherlands became independent of France.
3. The U.S. legation in The Hague was closed in 1940 following the German invasion of the Netherlands. During WWII the U.S. maintained diplomatic relations with the government-in-exile of the Netherlands in London. The embassy in The Hague was reopened in August 1945.

- New Zealand
  - Consulate:
  - Recognized: 1942
  - Relations established: 1942
  - Legation/embassy established: 1942
  - First ambassador: Patrick J. Hurley
  - Relations ended: —

- Nicaragua
  - Consulate:
  - Recognized: 1849
  - Relations established: 1849
  - Legation/embassy established: 1851
  - First ambassador: Solon Borland (1853)
  - Relations ended: —
  - Notes:
1. Nicaragua had previously been recognized as part of the Federal Republic of Central America.
2. Ambassador Borland was concurrently commissioned to Costa Rica, El Salvador, Guatemala, Honduras, and Nicaragua.
3. The U.S. severed diplomatic relations with Nicaragua on December 1, 1909. Normal diplomatic relations were restored in 1911.
4. The U.S. severed diplomatic relations with Nicaragua and withdrew recognition in 1926 following a coup d’état by Emiliano Chamorro Vargas. The U.S. recognized the successor government and reestablished relations later that year.
5. The U.S. severed diplomatic relations with Nicaragua in 1947 following a coup d’état by Anastasio Somoza García. Relations were reestablished in 1948 following elections in Nicaragua.
6. In 1988 the Sandinista government of Nicaragua expelled the U.S. ambassador and seven members of the diplomatic corps. The embassy remained open under a chargé d’affaires a.i. until a new ambassador was commissioned in 1990.

- Niger
  - Consulate:
  - Recognized: 1960
  - Relations established: 1960
  - Legation/embassy established: 1961
  - First ambassador: R. Borden Reams
  - Relations ended: —
  - Notes:
1. Ambassador Reams was commissioned to Dahomey, Ivory Coast, Niger, and Upper Volta while resident in Abidjan.

- Nigeria
  - Consulate:
  - Recognized: 1960
  - Relations established: 1960
  - Legation/embassy established: 1960
  - First ambassador: Joseph Palmer II
  - Relations ended: —

- Niue
  - Consulate:
  - Recognized: 2023
  - Relations established: 2023
  - Legation/embassy established:
  - First ambassador:
  - Relations ended: —

- Norway
  - Consulate: 1809
  - Recognized: 1905
  - Relations established: 1905
  - Legation/embassy established: 1905
  - First ambassador: Herbert H. D. Peirce (1906)
  - Relations ended: —
  - Notes:
1. Prior to 1905, Sweden and Norway were politically united. The United States Ambassador to Sweden thus was the U.S. representative for Norway as well as Sweden. In 1905 Sweden and Norway peacefully separated and Norway became an independent constitutional monarchy.
2. Strictly, Charles H. Graves was the first U.S. ambassador to Norway. He was the ambassador to Sweden in 1905 when Sweden and Norway separated, and he represented the U.S. to both Sweden and Norway until June 1906 when Ambassador Peirce presented his credentials.
3. The U.S. legation in Oslo was closed in August 1940 following the German invasion of Norway. Diplomatic relations with Norway were maintained with the government-in-exile of Norway in London during WWII. The embassy in Oslo was reopened in May 1945 under Ambassador Lithgow Osborne.

- Oldenburg, Duchy of
  - Consulate:
  - Recognized: 1829
  - Relations established: —
  - Legation/embassy established: —
  - First ambassador: —
  - Relations ended: 1867
  - Notes:
1. The U.S. and the Duchy of Oldenburg never established diplomatic relations. The Duchy was absorbed into the North German Confederation in 1867 and ceased to exist as a sovereign state.

- Oman
  - Consulate: 1880
  - Recognized: 1833
  - Relations established: 1972
  - Legation/embassy established: 1972
  - First ambassador: William Stoltzfus
  - Relations ended: —
  - Notes:
1. Ambassador Stoltzfus was concurrently commissioned to Oman, Bahrain, Kuwait, Qatar, and the United Arab Emirates while resident in Kuwait. The first ambassador commissioned solely to Oman was William D. Wolle in 1974.

- Orange Free State
  - Consulate: 1891
  - Recognized: 1871
  - Relations established: —
  - Legation/embassy established: —
  - First ambassador: —
  - Relations ended: 1902
  - Notes:
1. The U.S. and the Orange Free State never established formal diplomatic relations. In 1902 the Orange Free State was absorbed into the British Empire and ceased to exist as a sovereign state.

- Pakistan
  - Consulate:
  - Recognized: 1947
  - Relations established: 1947
  - Legation/embassy established: 1947
  - First ambassador: Paul H. Alling
  - Relations ended: —

- Palau
  - Consulate:
  - Recognized: 1994
  - Relations established: 1996
  - Legation/embassy established: 2004
  - First ambassador: Thomas C. Hubbard
  - Relations ended: —
  - Notes:
1. The first U.S. ambassador to the Philippines was concurrently accredited to Palau while resident in Manila. Since 2004 one ambassador has been solely accredited to Palau.

- Panama
  - Consulate: 1823
  - Recognized: 1903
  - Relations established: 1903
  - Legation/embassy established: 1903
  - First ambassador: William Insco Buchanan
  - Relations ended: —
  - Notes:
1. Panama was part of Colombia until 1903.
2. Diplomatic relations between the U.S. and Panama were briefly interrupted in January 1931 following a coup d’état. Relations were resumed after about two weeks.
3. Diplomatic relations between the U.S. and Panama were interrupted for about three weeks November–December 1949 following government upheaval in Panama.
4. The government of Panama severed diplomatic relations with the U.S. in January 1964, following the Flag Pole Incident in the Canal Zone. Normal relations were resumed in April 1964.
5. Diplomatic relations between the U.S. and Panama were briefly interrupted October–November 1968 following a coup d’état. Relations were resumed after about four weeks.
6. President George H. W. Bush recalled the U.S. Ambassador in May 1989, following dictator Noriega's refusal to cede power after an election. Relations with a new Panamanian government were restored following the U.S. invasion of Panama and the capture of Noriega in January 1990.

- Papal States (see also Holy See)
  - Consulate: 1797
  - Recognized:
  - Relations established: 1848
  - Legation/embassy established: 1848
  - First ambassador: Lewis Cass, Jr.
  - Relations ended: 1870
  - Notes:
1. There is no clear record of a date for diplomatic recognition of the Papal States by the United States.
2. The American mission to the Papal States closed in 1867 after Congress refused to fund the mission any longer.
3. Rome was incorporated into the Kingdom of Italy in 1870 and the Papal States ceased to exist. For later representation, see Holy See.

- Papua New Guinea
  - Consulate: 1974
  - Recognized: 1975
  - Relations established: 1975
  - Legation/embassy established: 1975
  - First ambassador: Mary S. Olmsted
  - Relations ended: —

- Paraguay
  - Consulate:
  - Recognized: 1852
  - Relations established: 1861
  - Legation/embassy established: 1861
  - First ambassador: Charles Ames Washburn
  - Relations ended: —
  - Notes:
1. Washburn was appointed as Commissioner in 1861 and promoted to Minister Resident in 1863.
2. From 1870 until 1914, one minister was concurrently commissioned to Paraguay and Uruguay, while resident in Montevideo, Uruguay.

- Parma, Duchy of
  - Consulate:
  - Recognized: 1850
  - Relations established: 1853
  - Legation/embassy established: —
  - First ambassador: —
  - Relations ended: 1860
  - Notes:
1. No ambassadors were exchanged between the Duchy of Parma and the U.S. The Duchy was absorbed into the Kingdom of Piedmont-Sardinia in 1860 and ceased to exist as a sovereign state.

- Peru
  - Consulate:
  - Recognized: 1826
  - Relations established: 1827
  - Legation/embassy established: 1827
  - First ambassador: John Randolph Clay (1853)
  - Relations ended: —
  - Notes:
1. A series of chargés represented the U.S. in Peru until 1853, when the first ranking minister was appointed.

- Peru–Bolivian Confederation
  - Consulate:
  - Recognized: 1837
  - Relations established: 1837
  - Legation/embassy established: 1837
  - First ambassador: James B. Thornton (chargé d’affaires)
  - Relations ended: 1839
  - Notes:
1. The Peru–Bolivian Confederation was dissolved in 1839.
2. Chargé d’Affaires Thornton was commissioned to Peru but received by the government of the Peru–Bolivian Confederation. Two chargés represented the U.S. during the period of the Confederation. No ranking minister was appointed.
3. The second chargé, James C. Pickett, was commissioned to the Confederation, but presented his credentials in 1840, after the dissolution of the Confederation; thus he was received by the government of Peru.

- Philippines
  - Consulate:
  - Recognized: 1946
  - Relations established: 1946
  - Legation/embassy established: 1946
  - First ambassador: Paul V. McNutt
  - Relations ended: —

- Piedmont-Sardinia
  - Consulate: 1802
  - Recognized: 1802
  - Relations established: 1839
  - Legation/embassy established: 1840
  - First ambassador: Hezekiah Gold Rogers
  - Relations ended: 1861
  - Notes:
1. No U.S. ambassador was appointed to Piedmont-Sardinia. The Chargé d’Affaires to Italy represented the U.S.
2. Piedmont-Sardinia was absorbed into the Kingdom of Italy in 1861 and ceased to exist as a sovereign state.

- Poland
  - Consulate: 1871
  - Recognized: 1919
  - Relations established: 1919
  - Legation/embassy established: 1919
  - First ambassador: Hugh S. Gibson
  - Relations ended: —
  - Notes:
1. The U.S. embassy in Warsaw was closed in September 1939 following the German invasion of Poland. The U.S. continued diplomatic relations with the government-in-exile of Poland during WWII, first in France (September 1939–June 1940) and then in England (1940–1945). The embassy in Warsaw was reopened in August 1945.

- Portugal
  - Consulate: 1790
  - Recognized: 1791
  - Relations established: 1791
  - Legation/embassy established: 1791
  - First ambassador: David Humphreys
  - Relations ended: —
  - Notes:
1. During the Napoleonic Wars, the King of Portugal fled to Brazil. The U.S. legation followed and was located in Rio de Janeiro 1810–21. The legation in Lisbon reopened in 1822.

- Qatar
  - Consulate:
  - Recognized: 1971
  - Relations established: 1972
  - Legation/embassy established: 1973
  - First ambassador: William Stoltzfus
  - Relations ended: —
  - Notes:
1. Ambassador Stoltzfus was concurrently commissioned to Oman, Bahrain, Kuwait, Qatar, and the United Arab Emirates while resident in Kuwait. The first ambassador commissioned solely to Qatar was Robert P. Paganelli in 1974.

- Romania
  - Consulate: 1866
  - Recognized: 1881
  - Relations established: 1880
  - Legation/embassy established: 1880
  - First ambassador: Eugene Schuyler
  - Relations ended: —
  - Notes:
1. Minister Schuyler's original office was Consul General. He was promoted to Minister Resident in 1883. Schuyler was concurrently minister to Romania, Serbia, and Greece while resident in Athens.
2. Romania declared war on the U.S. in December 1941 and severed diplomatic relations. Ambassador Franklin Mott Gunther died before he could leave the country. Diplomatic relations were reestablished in 1946 and the legation was reopened in 1947.

- Russia
  - Consulate: 1780
  - Recognized: 1780
  - Relations established: 1809
  - Legation/embassy established: 1809
  - First ambassador: John Quincy Adams
  - Relations ended: —
  - Notes:
1. U.S.–Russia diplomatic relations were interrupted in 1917 following the November Bolshevik Revolution in Russia. Diplomatic relations were never formally severed, but the U.S. refused to recognize or have any formal relations with the Bolshevik/Soviet governments.
2. In 1918, the U.S. embassy, which had been in St. Petersburg, was moved to Vologda and then to Arkhangelsk because of the close proximity of German troops during WWI.
3. In 1919 the U.S. embassy in Arkhangelsk was closed and diplomatic personnel were withdrawn.
4. In 1933 normal diplomatic relations were resumed, when President Roosevelt informed the Soviet Foreign Minister that the U.S. recognized the government of the U.S. S. R. and wished to establish normal diplomatic relations. The American embassy, which had been closed since 1919, was opened in Moscow.
5. In 1991, following the dissolution of the Soviet Union, the U.S. recognized the Russian Federation as the successor to the Soviet Union and reestablished normal diplomatic relations.

- Rwanda
  - Consulate:
  - Recognized: 1962
  - Relations established: 1962
  - Legation/embassy established: 1962
  - First ambassador: Charles D. Withers
  - Relations ended: —

- Saint Kitts and Nevis
  - Consulate:
  - Recognized: 1983
  - Relations established: 1983
  - Legation/embassy established: —
  - First ambassador: Thomas H. Anderson, Jr.
  - Relations ended: —
  - Notes:
1. The United States Ambassador to Barbados and the Eastern Caribbean represents the U.S. to Saint Kitts and Nevis, while resident at Bridgetown, Barbados.

- Saint Lucia
  - Consulate:
  - Recognized: 1979
  - Relations established: —
  - Legation/embassy established: —
  - First ambassador: Sally Angela Shelton (Sally Shelton-Colby)
  - Relations ended: —
  - Notes:
1. The United States Ambassador to Barbados and the Eastern Caribbean represents the U.S. to Saint Lucia, while resident at Bridgetown, Barbados.

- Saint Vincent and the Grenadines
  - Consulate:
  - Recognized: 1981
  - Relations established: 1981
  - Legation/embassy established: —
  - First ambassador: Milan D. Bish
  - Relations ended: —
  - Notes:
1. The United States Ambassador to Barbados and the Eastern Caribbean represents the U.S. to Saint Vincent and the Grenadines, while resident at Bridgetown, Barbados.

- Samoa
  - Consulate: 1856
  - Recognized: 1962
  - Relations established: 1971
  - Legation/embassy established: 1988
  - First ambassador: Kenneth Franzheim II
  - Relations ended: —
  - Notes:
1. The U.S. Ambassador to New Zealand is concurrently accredited to Fiji, Samoa, and Tonga, while resident in Wellington, New Zealand.

- San Marino
  - Consulate: 1925
  - Recognized: 1861
  - Relations established: 1861
  - Legation/embassy established: —
  - First ambassador: Ronald P. Spogli
  - Relations ended: —
  - Notes:
1. The United States recognized San Marino when President Abraham Lincoln, in a letter dated May 7, 1861, accepted San Marino's offer of honorary citizenship.
2. The U.S. Ambassador to Italy is concurrently accredited to San Marino, while resident in Rome.

- São Tomé and Príncipe
  - Consulate:
  - Recognized: 1975
  - Relations established: 1976
  - Legation/embassy established: —
  - First ambassador: Andrew L. Steigman
  - Relations ended: —
  - Notes:
1. The U.S. Ambassador to Gabon is concurrently commissioned to São Tomé and Príncipe, while resident in Libreville, Gabon. There is no U.S. embassy in São Tomé.

- Saudi Arabia
  - Consulate:
  - Recognized: 1931
  - Relations established: 1940
  - Legation/embassy established: 1942
  - First ambassador: Bert Fish
  - Relations ended: —
  - Notes:
1. Ambassador Fish was concurrently accredited to Egypt and Saudi Arabia, while resident at Cairo. The first ambassador solely accredited to Saudi Arabia was James S. Moose, Jr. in 1943.

- Schaumburg-Lippe
  - Consulate:
  - Recognized: 1854
  - Relations established: —
  - Legation/embassy established: —
  - First ambassador: —
  - Relations ended: 1867
  - Notes:
1. The U.S. and the Principality of Schaumburg-Lippe never established formal diplomatic relations. The principality joined the North German Confederation in 1867 and ceased to exist as a sovereign state.

- Senegal
  - Consulate:
  - Recognized: 1960
  - Relations established: 1960
  - Legation/embassy established: 1960
  - First ambassador: Henry Serrano Villard
  - Relations ended: —
  - Notes:
1. Until 1980 the ambassadors to Senegal were concurrently accredited to other west African nations, while resident in Dakar, Senegal. In 1980 Walter Carrington was appointed as the first ambassador solely commissioned to Senegal.

- Serbia
  - Consulate:
  - Recognized: 1881
  - Relations established: 1882
  - Legation/embassy established: 1882
  - First ambassador: Eugene Schuyler
  - Relations ended: —
  - Notes:
1. Serbia was recognized as Kingdom of Serbia in 1881. The first ambassadors were accredited to Greece, Romania, and Serbia, while resident in Athens.
2. In the wake of the breakup of the Austrian Empire following WWI, the nation was first named the Kingdom of Serbs, Croats and Slovenes and was renamed the Kingdom of Yugoslavia in 1929.
3. The government of Yugoslavia went into exile in England on April 14, 1941, in anticipation of German occupation. The U.S. Legation was closed. The U.S. continued diplomatic relations with the government-in-exile in London (1941–43), then in Cairo (1943–44), and then back to London. The U.S. Embassy in Belgrade was reopened in March 1945.
4. In 1992 the U.S. announced that it would not recognize the Federal Republic of Yugoslavia (FRY) as a successor state of the Socialist Federal Republic of Yugoslavia (SFRY). The U.S. ambassador was recalled but the mission continued under the authority of a chargé d'affaires ad interim.
5. In 1999 the U.S. severed diplomatic relations with the FRY and closed the embassy in Belgrade. Diplomatic recognition and full diplomatic relations between the two countries were established in 2000.

- Seychelles
  - Consulate:
  - Recognized: 1976
  - Relations established: 1976
  - Legation/embassy established: 1976
  - First ambassador: Anthony Dryden Marshall
  - Relations ended: —
  - Notes:
1. Until 1982 the ambassadors were concurrently accredited to Kenya and the Seychelles, while resident at Nairobi, Kenya. In 1982–96 one ambassador was accredited solely to the Seychelles. In 1996 the U.S. embassy in Victoria was closed and the U.S. ambassador to Mauritius served concurrently as ambassador to the Seychelles, while resident in Port Louis, Mauritius.

- Sierra Leone
  - Consulate:
  - Recognized: 1961
  - Relations established: 1961
  - Legation/embassy established: 1961
  - First ambassador: Albert Sidney Johnson Carnahan
  - Relations ended: —

- Singapore
  - Consulate: 1836
  - Recognized: 1965
  - Relations established: 1966
  - Legation/embassy established: 1966
  - First ambassador: Francis Joseph Galbraith
  - Relations ended: —

- Slovakia
  - Consulate:
  - Recognized: 1993
  - Relations established: 1993
  - Legation/embassy established: 1993
  - First ambassador: Theodore E. Russell
  - Relations ended: —

- Slovenia
  - Consulate:
  - Recognized: 1992
  - Relations established: 1992
  - Legation/embassy established: 1992
  - First ambassador: E. Allan Wendt
  - Relations ended: —

- Solomon Islands
  - Consulate:
  - Recognized: 1978
  - Relations established: 1978
  - Legation/embassy established: 1978
  - First ambassador: Mary S. Olmsted
  - Relations ended: —
  - Notes:
1. The ambassador to the Solomon Islands is concurrently accredited to Papua New Guinea and the Solomon Islands, while resident in Port Moresby, Papua New Guinea.
2. The U.S. Embassy in at Honiara was closed on July 30, 1993 but diplomatic relations continued through the nonresident ambassador.

- Somalia
  - Consulate:
  - Recognized: 1960
  - Relations established: 1960
  - Legation/embassy established: 1960
  - First ambassador: Andrew G. Lynch
  - Relations ended: —
  - Notes:
1. The U.S. embassy was closed in 1991 and all U.S. personnel were withdrawn after the collapse of the central Somali government. However, the U.S. never severed diplomatic relations with Somalia. The U.S. maintains regular dialogue with the Transitional Federal Government and other key stakeholders in Somalia through the U.S. embassy in Nairobi, Kenya.

- South Africa
  - Consulate:
  - Recognized: 1929
  - Relations established: 1929
  - Legation/embassy established: 1929
  - First ambassador: Ralph James Totten
  - Relations ended: —

- South Sudan
- Consulate: —
- Recognized: July 9, 2011
- Relations established: July 9, 2011
- Embassy established: July 9, 2011
- First ambassador: R. Barrie Walkley, Chargé d’Affaires
- Relations ended: —
- Notes:
1. A U.S. consulate had been established in Juba prior to independence of South Sudan. The previous consulate was elevated to embassy status upon U.S. recognition of South Sudan.

- Spain
  - Consulate: 1797
  - Recognized: 1783
  - Relations established: 1783
  - Legation/embassy established: 1783
  - First ambassador: William Short (1794)
  - Relations ended: —
  - Notes:
1. The Continental Congress of the United States of America sent John Jay to Spain in 1779 in an attempt to convince the Spanish Court to recognize the new nation. Jay spent two years in Spain but the court declined to receive him. Thus he was not officially the ambassador to Spain.
2. Spain finally recognized the U.S. in 1783 when it became apparent that Britain and the U.S. would sign a treaty to end the war.
3. Spain severed diplomatic relations with the United States on April 21, 1898, and the legation in Madrid was closed on that day. The United States declared war on Spain as of that date by an Act of Congress approved April 25, 1898. Relations were restored in June 1899.

- Sri Lanka
  - Consulate:
  - Recognized: 1948
  - Relations established: 1948
  - Legation/embassy established: 1949
  - First ambassador: Felix Cole
  - Relations ended: —

- Sudan
  - Consulate:
  - Recognized: 1956
  - Relations established: 1956
  - Legation/embassy established: 1956
  - First ambassador: Lowell C. Pinkerton
  - Relations ended: —
  - Notes:
1. Sudan severed diplomatic relations with the United States on June 7, 1967, in the wake of the 1967 Arab-Israeli War. A U.S. Interests Section was established in the embassy of the Netherlands. Normal relations were restored and the embassy was reopened in 1972.
2. Ambassador Cleo A. Noel, Jr. was assassinated at post on March 2, 1973.
3. The U.S. Embassy in Khartoum was closed in February 1996. The embassy was reopened in 2002. No U.S. ambassador has been appointed since 2002 and a series of chargés d’affaires has represented the U.S. in Khartoum.

- Suriname
  - Consulate:
  - Recognized: 1975
  - Relations established: 1975
  - Legation/embassy established: 1975
  - First ambassador: Joseph Owen Zurhellen
  - Relations ended: —

- Swaziland
  - Consulate:
  - Recognized: 1968
  - Relations established: 1968
  - Legation/embassy established: 1968
  - First ambassador: Charles J. Nelson (1971)
  - Relations ended: —
  - Notes:
1. Until 1979 one ambassador was accredited to Botswana, Swaziland, and Lesotho, while resident at Gaborone, Botswana.

- Sweden
  - Consulate: 1818
  - Recognized: 1783
  - Relations established: 1818
  - Legation/embassy established: 1818
  - First ambassador: Jonathan Russell (1814)
  - Relations ended: —
  - Notes:
1. Benjamin Franklin, who was the U.S. Minister to France, had been appointed additionally as Minister to Sweden. He did not proceed to Stockholm and was not officially received by the court; thus he was not officially the Minister to Sweden. Nevertheless, he negotiated a treaty of friendship and recognition with Sweden.
2. Minister Russell was appointed Minister to Sweden in 1814 but did not present his credentials until 1818 when diplomatic relations were officially established between Sweden and the U.S.
3. A series of chargés d’affaires represented the U.S. in Stockholm 1818–1849, when Francis Schroeder was appointed Minister Resident.

- Switzerland
  - Consulate: 1829
  - Recognized: 1829
  - Relations established: 1853
  - Legation/embassy established: 1853
  - First ambassador: Theodore Sedgwick Fay
  - Relations ended: —

- Syria
  - Consulate:
  - Recognized: 1944
  - Relations established: 1944
  - Legation/embassy established: 1944
  - First ambassador: George Wadsworth
  - Relations ended: —
  - Notes:
1. Ambassador Wadsworth had been serving in Lebanon as Diplomatic Agent/Consul General since 1942. He was promoted to Envoy Extraordinary and Minister Plenipotentiary upon establishment of U.S.–Syria diplomatic relations. He was concurrently commissioned to Lebanon and Syria, while resident in Beirut.
2. Egypt and Syria united to form a new state, the United Arab Republic (UAR) in 1958. The U.S. recognized the UAR immediately. The American Embassy in Damascus was reclassified as a Consulate General. Syria seceded from the Union in 1961 and U.S.–Syria diplomatic relations were reestablished.
3. Syria severed diplomatic relations with the U.S. on June 6, 1967 in the wake of the 1967 Arab-Israeli War. Normal relations were resumed in 1974.
4. The U.S. recalled its ambassador to Syria in 2005 after the assassination of Rafic Hariri. A series of chargés d’affaires represented the U.S. until the appointment of Robert Stephen Ford in January 2011.

- Tajikistan
  - Consulate:
  - Recognized: 1991
  - Relations established: 1992
  - Legation/embassy established: 1992
  - First ambassador: Stanley Tuemler Escudero
  - Relations ended: —
  - Notes:
1. After the 1998 United States embassy bombings in Africa, diplomatic personnel at embassy Dushanbe were temporarily relocated to Almaty, Kazakhstan, due to heightened embassy security standards. The embassy was later reopened.

- Tanzania
  - Consulate:
  - Recognized: 1961
  - Relations established: 1961
  - Legation/embassy established: 1961
  - First ambassador: William K. Leonhart
  - Relations ended: —
  - Notes:
1. Ambassador Leonhart was originally commissioned to Tanganyika. He continued to serve as ambassador to Tanzania after the union of Tanganyika and Zanzibar in 1964.

- Texas
  - Consulate: 1830
  - Recognized: 1837
  - Relations established: 1837
  - Legation/embassy established: 1837
  - First ambassador: Alcée Louis la Branche
  - Relations ended: 1846
  - Notes:
1. A series of six chargés d’affaires represented the U. S government to the Republic of Texas. No ranking minister was appointed.
2. Texas was annexed to the U.S. in 1846 and ceased to exist as a sovereign state.

- Thailand
  - Consulate: 1859
  - Recognized: 1833
  - Relations established: 1882
  - Legation/embassy established: 1882
  - First ambassador: John A. Halderman
  - Relations ended: —
  - Notes:
1. U.S.–Thailand diplomatic relations were interrupted in 1942 when Thailand declared war on the U.S. during the Japanese occupation. The U.S. embassy was closed. Normal relations were restored in 1946.

- Timor-Leste
  - Consulate:
  - Recognized: 2002
  - Relations established: 2002
  - Legation/embassy established: 2002
  - First ambassador: Grover J. Rees III
  - Relations ended: —

- Togo
  - Consulate:
  - Recognized: 1960
  - Relations established: 1960
  - Legation/embassy established: 1960
  - First ambassador: Leland Barrows
  - Relations ended: —

- Tonga (1)
  - Consulate: 1897
  - Recognized: 1886
  - Relations established: —
  - Legation/embassy established: —
  - First ambassador: —
  - Relations ended: 1900
  - Notes:
1. Tonga had been a sovereign state since 1845, but became a British protectorate in 1900. While Tonga remained independent, the British Foreign Office would maintain sole control of all foreign relations of Tonga. The protectorate ended in 1970.

- Tonga (2)
  - Consulate:
  - Recognized: 1972
  - Relations established: 1972
  - Legation/embassy established: —
  - First ambassador: Kenneth Franzheim II
  - Relations ended: —
  - Notes:
1. The British protectorate of Tonga ended in 1970 and Tonga became an independent and sovereign state.
2. Franzheim was the U.S. ambassador to New Zealand and was concurrently commissioned to Fiji, Tonga, and Western Samoa, while resident in Wellington, New Zealand. In 1979 the ambassador to Fiji assumed the commission to Fiji, Kiribati, Nauru, and Tuvalu, while resident in Suva, Fiji.

- Trinidad and Tobago
  - Consulate:
  - Recognized: 1962
  - Relations established: 1962
  - Legation/embassy established: 1962
  - First ambassador: Robert G. Miner
  - Relations ended: —

- Tunisia
  - Consulate: 1795
  - Recognized: 1956
  - Relations established: 1956
  - Legation/embassy established: 1956
  - First ambassador: George Lewis Jones
  - Relations ended: —

- Turkey
  - Consulate:
  - Recognized: 1830
  - Relations established: 1831
  - Legation/embassy established: 1831
  - First ambassador: David Porter
  - Relations ended: —
  - Notes:
1. Turkey severed diplomatic relations with the United States in 1917 after the United States declared war against Germany. Relations were reestablished in 1927.

- Turkmenistan
  - Consulate:
  - Recognized: 1991
  - Relations established: 1992
  - Legation/embassy established: 1992
  - First ambassador: Joseph S. Hulings
  - Relations ended: —

- Tuvalu
  - Consulate:
  - Recognized: 1978
  - Relations established: 1979
  - Legation/embassy established: —
  - First ambassador: John Peter Condon
  - Relations ended: —
  - Notes:
1. The U.S. ambassador to Tuvalu is concurrently commissioned to Fiji, Kiribati, Nauru, and Tonga, while resident in Suva, Fiji. There is no U.S. embassy in Tuvalu.

- Tuscany, Grand Duchy of
  - Consulate: 1794
  - Recognized: 1817
  - Relations established: —
  - Legation/embassy established: —
  - First ambassador: —
  - Relations ended: 1861
  - Notes:
1. The Grand Duchy of Tuscany recognized the U.S. in 1794 and received a U.S. Consul. The U.S. government received a consul from the Grand Duchy in 1817, which constituted de facto recognition. The U.S. and the Grand Duchy never established formal diplomatic relations.
2. The Grand Duchy of Tuscany was absorbed into the Kingdom of Italy in 1861 and ceased to exist as a sovereign state.

- Two Sicilies, Kingdom of the
  - Consulate: 1796
  - Recognized: 1796
  - Relations established: 1832
  - Legation/embassy established: 1832
  - First ambassador: Robert Dale Owen (1854)
  - Relations ended: 1861
  - Notes:
1. Initial recognition between the U.S. and the Kingdom was made with the Kingdom of Naples. The Kingdom of Naples joined with the Kingdom of Sicily in 1816 to become the Kingdom of the Two Sicilies.
2. A series of chargés d’affaires represented the U.S. to the Kingdom until the first ranking minister was appointed in 1854.
3. The Kingdom of the Two Sicilies was absorbed into the Kingdom of Sardinia in 1860 and then into the Kingdom of Italy in 1861 and ceased to exist as a sovereign state. The U.S. legation in Naples was closed in 1860. The U.S. recognized the Kingdom of Italy in 1861.

- Uganda
  - Consulate:
  - Recognized: 1961
  - Relations established: 1962
  - Legation/embassy established: 1962
  - First ambassador: Olcott Deming
  - Relations ended: —
  - Notes:
1. The U.S. embassy in Kampala was closed and all personnel were withdrawn in 1973 due to security concerns. In 1979 the embassy was reopened and a new ambassador was appointed in 1979.

- Ukraine
  - Consulate:
  - Recognized: 1991
  - Relations established: 1991
  - Legation/embassy established: 1992
  - First ambassador: Roman Popadiuk
  - Relations ended: —

- Union of Soviet Socialist Republics (USSR) – see Russia

- United Arab Emirates
  - Consulate:
  - Recognized: 1971
  - Relations established: 1972
  - Legation/embassy established: 1974
  - First ambassador: William Stoltzfus
  - Relations ended: —
  - Notes:
1. The first ambassador was concurrently accredited to Bahrain, Kuwait, Oman, Qatar, and the UAE, while resident at Kuwait. The first ambassador commissioned solely to the UAE was Michael Edmund Sterner in 1974.

- United Kingdom
  - Consulate: 1798
  - Recognized: 1783
  - Relations established: 1785
  - Legation/embassy established: 1785
  - First ambassador: John Adams
  - Relations ended: —
  - Notes:
1. Minister Adams was concurrently commissioned to the U. K. and the Netherlands, while resident in London.
2. Adams became so frustrated with the cool reception at the court in London that he closed the legation in 1788 and the post remained vacant for four years. The next ambassador was appointed in 1792.
3. The U.S. severed diplomatic relations with the U. K. when it declared war against its former colonial ruler on June 18, 1812. Normal relations were restored in 1815 with the appointment of minister John Quincy Adams.

- Uruguay
  - Consulate:
  - Recognized: 1836
  - Relations established: 1867
  - Legation/embassy established: 1870
  - First ambassador: Alexander Asboth
  - Relations ended: —
  - Notes:
1. Ambassador Asboth was concurrently commissioned to Argentina and Uruguay, while resident at Buenos Aires.

- Uzbekistan
  - Consulate:
  - Recognized: 1991
  - Relations established: 1991
  - Legation/embassy established: 1992
  - First ambassador: Henry Lee Clarke
  - Relations ended: —

- Vanuatu
  - Consulate:
  - Recognized: 1980
  - Relations established: 1986
  - Legation/embassy established: —
  - First ambassador: Everett E. Bierman
  - Relations ended: —
  - Notes:
1. The U.S. Ambassador to Papua New Guinea is concurrently accredited to the Solomon Islands and Vanuatu, while resident in Port Moresby, Papua New Guinea.

- Venezuela
  - Consulate: 1824
  - Recognized: 1835
  - Relations established: 1835
  - Legation/embassy established: 1835
  - First ambassador: Charles Eames (1854)
  - Relations ended: —
  - Notes:
1. The U.S. had previously recognized Venezuela as a part of Gran Colombia in 1822. Venezuela was recognized separately in 1835 after the federation broke apart in 1831.
2. A series of chargés d’affaires represented the U.S. until 1854 when the first ranking minister, Charles Eames, was appointed.
3. The U.S. severed diplomatic relations with Venezuela in 1908. Relations were resumed in 1909.
4. In 2008 Venezuela declared the U.S. Ambassador persona non grata and expelled him. The U.S. reciprocated by expelling the Venezuelan ambassador. Since that time, Venezuela has refused to accept Larry Palmer as the new ambassador.

- Vietnam (1)
  - Consulate: 1907
  - Recognized: 1950
  - Relations established: 1950
  - Legation/embassy established: 1950
  - First ambassador: Donald R. Heath
  - Relations ended: 1954
  - Notes:
1. The U.S. recognized the State of Vietnam in 1950, which claimed authority over all of Vietnam. When Vietnam was partitioned into North and South in 1954, The U.S. recognized South Vietnam but did not recognize the communist government of North Vietnam under Ho Chi Minh. The U.S. maintained its embassy in Saigon.
2. Ambassador Heath was concurrently commissioned to Vietnam and Laos, while resident at Saigon. The first resident ambassador was Charles Woodruff Yost in 1954.

- Vietnam (2)
  - Consulate:
  - Recognized: 1995
  - Relations established: 1995
  - Legation/embassy established: 1995
  - First ambassador: Pete Peterson
  - Relations ended: —
  - Notes:
1. A U.S. Liaison Office was opened in Hanoi in 1995 and the first ranking ambassador was appointed in 1997.

- Vietnam, South
  - Consulate:
  - Recognized: 1950
  - Relations established: 1950
  - Legation/embassy established: 1950
  - First ambassador: Donald R. Heath
  - Relations ended: 1975
  - Notes:
1. The U.S. embassy in Saigon was closed and all personnel evacuated April 29, 1975, the day before the Fall of Saigon.

- Württemberg, Kingdom of
  - Consulate: 1842
  - Recognized: 1825
  - Relations established: —
  - Legation/embassy established: —
  - First ambassador: —
  - Relations ended: 1871
  - Notes:
1. U.S. Ambassador to Prussia George Bancroft was given special accreditation to the Kingdom of Württemberg but is not listed as official minister.
2. In 1871 Württemberg became a member of the new German Empire and ceased to exist as a sovereign state.

- Yemen, North
  - Consulate:
  - Recognized: 1946
  - Relations established: 1946
  - Legation/embassy established: 1959
  - First ambassador: James Rives Childs (1946)
  - Relations ended: 1990
  - Notes:
1. The U.S. recognized the Mutawakkilite Kingdom of Yemen in 1946. The U.S. again recognized the government when it became the Yemen Arab Republic following a coup d’état in 1962.
2. Ambassador Childs was concurrently accredited to Saudi Arabia and the Kingdom of Yemen, while resident at Jeddah. The first ambassador solely accredited to North Yemen was Donald R. Heath in 1957. However, Heath did not present his credentials, so he was not officially the ambassador. The next official ambassador was Raymond A. Hare in 1959.
3. In 1966 the U.S. embassy was moved from Ta'izz to Sana'a.
4. 1962–1967, during a period of civil war in North Yemen, there was no ambassador commissioned to the Yemen Arab Republic. A series of chargés d’affaires represented the U.S.
5. The Yemen Arab Republic (North Yemen) severed relations with the United States on June 7, 1967 in the wake of the Arab-Israeli Six-Day War. Normal relations were reestablished in 1972 and the embassy was reopened.
6. In 1990, the Yemen Arab Republic (North Yemen) and the People's Democratic Republic of Yemen (South Yemen) united to form the Republic of Yemen.

- Yemen, South
  - Consulate:
  - Recognized: 1967
  - Relations established: 1967
  - Legation/embassy established: 1967
  - First ambassador: —
  - Relations ended: 1990
  - Notes:
1. The People's Democratic Republic of Yemen (South Yemen) severed diplomatic relations with the United States on October 24, 1969. William L. Eagleton was the first and last chargé d’affaires at the embassy at Aden. No ambassador had been appointed when relations were severed. Relations were resumed briefly in April 1990 and ended in May 1990 when North and South Yemen joined to form the Republic of Yemen. The embassy in Aden was never reopened.
2. In 1990, the Yemen Arab Republic (North Yemen) and the People's Democratic Republic of Yemen (South Yemen) united to form the Republic of Yemen.

- Yemen (Republic of Yemen)
  - Consulate:
  - Recognized: 1990
  - Relations established: 1990
  - Legation/embassy established: 1990
  - First ambassador: Charles Franklin Dunbar
  - Relations ended: —
  - Notes:
1. In 1990, the Republic of Yemen was formed by the union of the Yemen Arab Republic (North Yemen) and the People's Democratic Republic of Yemen (South Yemen).
2. Ambassador Dunbar had been the ambassador to North Yemen and continued as ambassador to united Republic of Yemen.

- Yugoslavia – see Serbia

- Zambia
  - Consulate:
  - Recognized: 1964
  - Relations established: 1964
  - Legation/embassy established: 1964
  - First ambassador: Robert Crocker Good (1965)
  - Relations ended: —

- Zimbabwe
  - Consulate:
  - Recognized: 1980
  - Relations established: 1980
  - Legation/embassy established: 1980
  - First ambassador: Robert V. Keeley
  - Relations ended: —
  - Notes:
1. The U.S. never recognized Rhodesia, nor Zimbabwe Rhodesia, the predecessor states to Zimbabwe.

== See also ==
- Ambassadors of the United States
- Timeline of United States diplomatic history
- Timeline of United States diplomatic relations
- History of the foreign policy of the United States
