= James A. Daley =

American diplomat (born 1941)

6th United States Ambassador to Antigua and Barbuda
- In office October 24, 2000 – March 1, 2001
- Preceded by: E. William Crotty
- Succeeded by: Earl Norfleet Phillips

Personal details
- Born: 1941 (age 84–85)

James A. Daley (born 1941) is an American former diplomat. He was sworn in as the U.S. Ambassador to Barbados, Antigua and Barbuda, the Commonwealth of Dominica, Grenada, St. Lucia, St. Kitts and Nevis, and St. Vincent and the Grenadines on August 21, 2000. He served until 2001.

At the time of his appointment, Daley was a member of the Board of Directors for the LoJack Corporation in Massachusetts and was a member of the Board of Directors of the Massachusetts Convention Center Authority. Daley has been an executive in the hospitality industry, serving as president or as director of the Back Bay Hilton Hotel, Daley Hotel Management Corporation, Copley Plaza Hotel, Boston Copley Plaza Hotel Corporation, M&D Restaurant, Inc, and JND Hotels, Inc.
