= G. Philip Hughes =

American diplomat (born 1953)

G. Philip Hughes (born September 7, 1953) is an American diplomat who served as Ambassador of the United States to Barbados, Dominica, St Lucia, Antigua, St. Vincent, and St. Christopher-Nevis-Anguilla from 1990 to 1993, under George H. W. Bush. He is also an adjunct professor at the Institute of World Politics, teaching a course on "The Art of Diplomacy".

== Biography ==
G. Philip Hughes was born on September 7, 1953, in Dayton, Ohio. After completing a B.A. from the University of Dayton in 1972, he went on to receive two M.A.s from Tufts University in 1974 and 1975, and an M.P.A. from the John F. Kennedy School of Government at Harvard University in 1978.

From 1975 to 1978, he worked as an assistant analyst for the Congressional Budget Office, and from 1978 to 1979 as a research fellow at the Brookings Institution. From 1979 to 1981, he served as Assistant Director for Intelligence Policy for the Office of the Secretary of Defense. From 1981 to 1985, he was Deputy Assistant to the Vice President, then George H. W. Bush, for National Security Affairs. From 1985 to 1986, he was Director for Latin American Affairs for the National Security Council. Hughes returned to the State Department in 1986 to work as Deputy Assistant Secretary for Technology Transfer and Control at the Department of State. From 1989 to 1990, he was Assistant Secretary of Commerce. In 1989 and 1990, he served as Executive Secretary of the National Security Council in President George H.W. Bush's White House.

In 1990 he was appointed to a three-year assignment as Ambassador of the United States to Barbados, Dominica, St Lucia, Antigua, St. Vincent, and St. Christopher-Nevis-Anguilla.

He has served as executive director of the National Council of World Affairs Organizations and managing director of the Council of the Americas. He was also vice-president of Manchester Trade, Ltd. He is a past president and former trustee of the Philadelphia Society and People to People International. He serves as a senior director at the White House Writers Group in Washington, D.C. He also serves as senior vice president and secretary of the Council of American Ambassadors; as chairman of the Association for Diplomatic Studies and Training (www.adst.org), on the campus of the Foreign Service Institute (); and as vice president of the Foreign Policy Discussion Group (www.fpdg.org). Since 2014, he has been program chair and a board member of the Washington Institute of Foreign Affairs (www.wifadc.org) and adjunct professor of diplomacy at the Institute of world Politics, Washington D.C. (www.iwp.edu). He is a senior associate of the Center for Strategic and International Studies.

Diplomatic posts
Preceded by Paul A. Russo	United States Ambassador to Barbados; 1990–1993	Succeeded by Jeanette W. Hyde
Preceded by Paul A. Russo	United States Ambassador to Dominica; 1990–1993	Succeeded by Jeanette W. Hyde
Preceded by Paul A. Russo	United States Ambassador to Saint Lucia; 1990–1993	Succeeded by Jeanette W. Hyde
Preceded by Paul A. Russo	United States Ambassador to Antigua; 1990–1993	Succeeded by Jeanette W. Hyde
Preceded by Paul A. Russo	United States Ambassador to St. Christopher-Nevis-Anguilla; 1990–1993	Succeeded by Jeanette W. Hyde
Preceded by Paul A. Russo	United States Ambassador to St. Vincent; 1990–1993	Succeeded by Jeanette W. Hyde
