= United States Ambassador to Barbados and the Eastern Caribbean =

American diplomatic position

Ambassador of the United States to Barbados, the Eastern Caribbean, and the OECS
- Seal of the United States Department of State

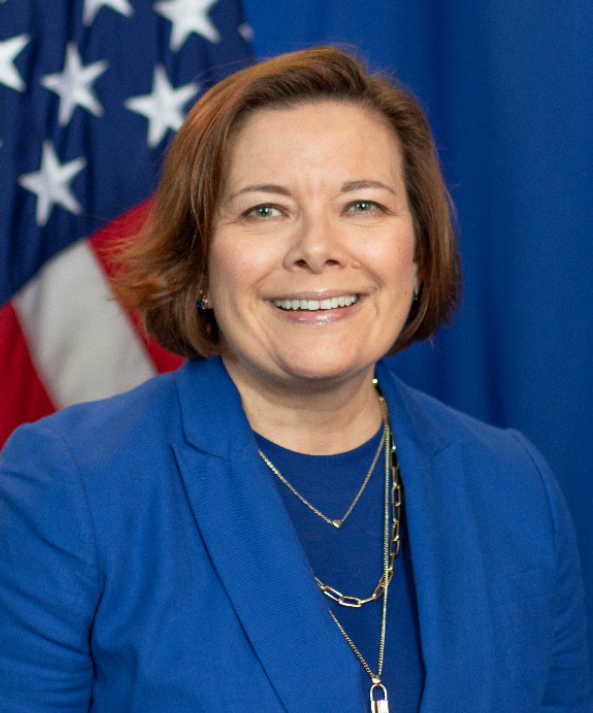
- Incumbent; Karin B. Sullivan; Chargé d'affaires since January 20, 2025
- Website: https://bb.usembassy.gov/

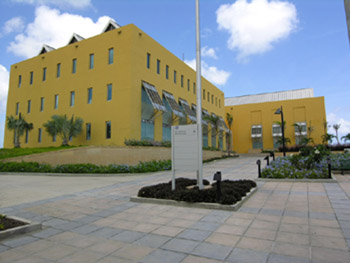
The U.S. embassy in Bridgetown, Barbados, 2006

The Ambassador of the United States to Barbados, the Eastern Caribbean, and the OECS is the official title of the U.S. Ambassador to several island nations of the Caribbean. The ambassador concurrently represents the United States to Antigua and Barbuda, Barbados, Dominica, Grenada, St. Kitts and Nevis, St. Lucia, and St. Vincent and the Grenadines. The ambassador is resident at the U.S. Embassy in Bridgetown, Barbados and is also accredited to the Organization of Eastern Caribbean States (OECS).

For the individual posts, see:

- United States Ambassador to Saint Vincent and the Grenadines (established 1981)

== Antigua and Barbuda ==
The United States ambassador to Antigua and Barbuda is the official representative of the government of the United States to the government of Antigua and Barbuda.

Paul Byrnes was Chargé d'Affaires ad interim between November 1, 1981 and January 8, 1982.

The United States established diplomatic relations with Antigua and Barbuda on November 1, 1981, when the Consulate General at St. John's was raised to embassy status. Embassy St. John's closed on June 30, 1994. Since that time, all diplomatic functions have been handled out of the U.S. Embassy at Bridgetown, Barbados.

== Barbados ==
The United States ambassador to Barbados is the official representative of the government of the United States to the government of Barbados.

== Dominica ==
The United States ambassador to Dominica is the official representative of the government of the United States to the government of Dominica. No mission has ever been established at Roseau. The role commenced July 18, 1979.

== Grenada ==
The United States ambassador to Grenada is the official representative of the government of the United States to the government of Grenada. The U.S. Government established an embassy in Grenada at St. George's on February 2, 1984. The U.S. Ambassador to Grenada is resident in Bridgetown, Barbados. The post commenced February 25, 1975.

== Saint Kitts and Nevis ==
The United States ambassador to Saint Kitts and Nevis (or, prior to August 3, 1988, to Saint Christopher and Nevis) is the official representative of the government of the United States to the government of Saint Kitts and Nevis. The United States established diplomatic relations with Saint Christopher and Nevis on September 20, 1983, but no U.S. mission has ever been established at Basseterre. After June 25, 1988, all relations were handled by the Embassy at St. John's, Antigua and Barbuda. When that Embassy closed on June 30, 1994, all diplomatic functions have been handled out of the U.S. Embassy at Bridgetown, Barbados, where the U.S. Ambassador to Saint Kitts and Nevis is resident.

== Saint Lucia ==
The United States ambassador to Saint Lucia is the official representative of the government of the United States to the government of Saint Lucia. No U.S. mission has ever been established at Castries. The post commenced June 11, 1979.

== Saint Vincent and the Grenadines ==
The United States ambassador to Saint Vincent and the Grenadines is the official representative of the government of the United States to the government of Saint Vincent and the Grenadines. No U.S. mission has ever been established at Kingstown. The post commenced on December 11, 1981.

== List ==
All of the following related to the United States ambassador to Barbados, with other responsibilities commencing from 1975.

Representative	Title	Presentation of credentials	Termination of mission	Appointed by
George Dolgin	Chargé d'Affaires ad interim	November 30, 1966	November 30, 1967	Lyndon B. Johnson
Fredric R. Mann	Ambassador Extraordinary and Plenipotentiary	November 27, 1967	April 10, 1969	Lyndon B. Johnson
Eileen R. Donovan	Ambassador Extraordinary and Plenipotentiary	September 5, 1969	August 3, 1974	Richard Nixon
Theodore R. Britton, Jr.	Ambassador Extraordinary and Plenipotentiary	February 12, 1975	April 22, 1977	Gerald Ford
Frank V. Ortiz, Jr.	Ambassador Extraordinary and Plenipotentiary	July 29, 1977	May 15, 1979	Jimmy Carter
Sally Shelton-Colby	Ambassador Extraordinary and Plenipotentiary	June 7, 1979	February 24, 1981	Jimmy Carter
Milan D. Bish	Ambassador Extraordinary and Plenipotentiary	December 10, 1981	March 4, 1984	Ronald Reagan
Thomas H. Anderson, Jr.	Ambassador Extraordinary and Plenipotentiary	July 11, 1984	March 12, 1986	Ronald Reagan
Paul A. Russo	Ambassador Extraordinary and Plenipotentiary	December 10, 1986	June 25, 1988	Ronald Reagan
John E. Clark	Chargé d'Affaires ad interim	June 25, 1988	November 14, 1990	Ronald Reagan
G. Philip Hughes	Ambassador Extraordinary and Plenipotentiary	November 14, 1990	June 17, 1993	George H. W. Bush
Jeanette W. Hyde	Ambassador Extraordinary and Plenipotentiary	April 14, 1994	January 31, 1998	Bill Clinton
E. William Crotty	Ambassador Extraordinary and Plenipotentiary	November 24, 1998	October 10, 1999	Bill Clinton
James A. Daley	Ambassador Extraordinary and Plenipotentiary	September 26, 2000	March 1, 2001	Bill Clinton
Marcia Bernicat	Chargé d'Affaires ad interim	August 2001	March 2002	
Roland W. Bullen	Chargé d'Affaires ad interim	March 2002	April 10, 2002	
Earl Norfleet Phillips	Ambassador Extraordinary and Plenipotentiary	April 10, 2002	June 1, 2003	George W. Bush
Mary E. Kramer	Ambassador Extraordinary and Plenipotentiary	February 3, 2004	October 30, 2006	George W. Bush
Mary Martin Ourisman	Ambassador Extraordinary and Plenipotentiary	November 7, 2006	January 16, 2009	George W. Bush
Brent Hardt	Chargé d'Affaires ad interim	January 16, 2009	June 19, 2011	Barack Obama
Christopher Sandrolini	Chargé d'Affaires ad interim	June 19, 2011	May 22, 2012	Barack Obama
Larry Leon Palmer	Ambassador Extraordinary and Plenipotentiary	May 22, 2012	January 19, 2016	Barack Obama
Linda Swartz Taglialatela	Ambassador Extraordinary and Plenipotentiary	February 1, 2016	December 27, 2023	Barack Obama; Donald Trump; Joe Biden
Joaquin F. Monserrate	Chargé d'Affaires ad interim	December 28, 2023	January 11, 2024	Joe Biden
Roger F. Nyhus	Ambassador Extraordinary and Plenipotentiary	January 19, 2024	January 20, 2025	Joe Biden
Karin B. Sullivan	Chargé d'Affaires ad interim	January 20, 2025	Incumbent	Donald Trump

== See also ==
- Antigua and Barbuda – United States relations
- Foreign relations of Antigua and Barbuda
- Ambassadors of the United States
- United States Consulate General Curaçao
