= Jeanette W. Hyde =

American diplomat (1938–2025)

4th United States Ambassador to Antigua and Barbuda
- In office April 10, 1995 – January 31, 1998
- President: Bill Clinton
- Preceded by: Paul A. Russo
- Succeeded by: E. William Crotty

Personal details
- Born: June 15, 1938 Hamptonville, North Carolina, U.S.
- Died: February 10, 2025 (aged 86) Raleigh, North Carolina, U.S.
- Spouse: Wallace Hyde
- Education: Wake Forest University; Delta State University (BS); University of Maryland; University of North Carolina; North Carolina State University

Jeanette W. Hyde (June 15, 1938 – February 10, 2025) was an American diplomat. She was Ambassador of the United States to Barbados, Dominica, and St Lucia from 1994 to 1998, and to Antigua, Grenada, St. Vincent, and St. Christopher-Nevis-Anguilla from 1995 to 1998, under Bill Clinton.

== Life and career ==
Jeanette W. Hyde was born in Hamptonville, North Carolina on June 15, 1938. She attended Wake Forest University, and received a B.S. from Delta State University in 1962. She later attended the University of Maryland at their Iraklion, Crete campus, and competed graduate studies in Counseling at the University of North Carolina, Chapel Hill and the North Carolina State University. She was teaching school for two years in Crete before going into social work and counseling with the N.C. Administrative Office of the Courts.

Hyde married Wallace Hyde, a Robbinsville, North Carolina native, and was a longtime Democratic Party fundraiser.

Hyde co-founded two banks in Raleigh, North Carolina, Triangle Bank and North State Bank.

Hyde served on the board of directors of the North Carolina Board of Transportation, the North Carolina Global Transpark, the North Carolina International Trade Commission, Outward Bound of North Carolina, and the North Carolina Child Advocacy Institute. She also served on the Board of Trustees of Wake Forest University, Western Carolina University, and American Diplomacy Journal, Inc. She previously served on the Board of The International Cabinet at the University of North Carolina at Wilmington, the Triangle World Affairs Council, Methodist Home for Children, the North Carolina Community Foundation and The Eisenhower Exchange Fellowship Board.

Hyde died following a period of ill health at her residence in Raleigh, on February 10, 2025, at the age of 86.

== Awards ==
In 1994, Hyde was awarded the Outstanding Woman in Public Service Award by the YWCA Academy of Women.

In 1998, she received the Triangle World Affairs Council's Distinguished Citizen for Public Service Award and the International Visitors Council's Citizen of the World Award.

Diplomatic posts
Preceded by G. Philip Hughes	United States Ambassador to Barbados; 1994–1998	Succeeded by E. William Crotty
Preceded by G. Philip Hughes	United States Ambassador to Dominica; 1994–1998	Succeeded by E. William Crotty
Preceded by G. Philip Hughes	United States Ambassador to Saint Lucia; 1994–1998	Succeeded by E. William Crotty
Preceded by G. Philip Hughes	United States Ambassador to Saint Vincent and the Grenadines; 1994–1998	Succeeded by E. William Crotty
Preceded by G. Philip Hughes	United States Ambassador to Antigua and Barbuda; 1995–1998	Succeeded by E. William Crotty
Preceded by G. Philip Hughes	United States Ambassador to Grenada; 1995–1998	Succeeded by E. William Crotty
Preceded by G. Philip Hughes	United States Ambassador to Saint Kitts and Nevis; 1995–1998	Succeeded by E. William Crotty
