= Paul A. Russo =

American diplomat (born 1943)

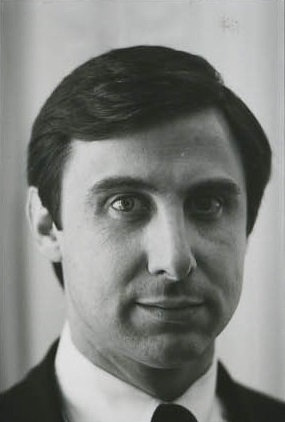
- 1981

United States Ambassador to Barbados
- In office December 10, 1986 – June 25, 1988 accredited to Antigua, Dominica, St. Vincent, St. Kitts and Nevis and St. Lucia
- President: Ronald Reagan
- Preceded by: Thomas H. Anderson, Jr.
- Succeeded by: G. Philip Hughes

3rd United States Ambassador to Antigua and Barbuda
- In office December 4, 1986 – June 15, 1988
- Preceded by: Thomas H. Anderson Jr.
- Succeeded by: Jeanette W. Hyde

Personal details
- Born: July 21, 1943 (age 83) Cleveland, Ohio, U.S.
- Education: Ohio State University (BA); Case Western Reserve University; Georgetown University

Paul A. Russo (born July 21, 1943) is an American diplomat. He was Ambassador of the United States to Barbados, Dominica, St Lucia, Antigua, St. Vincent, and St. Christopher-Nevis-Anguilla from 1986 to 1988, under Ronald Reagan.

== Biography ==
Russo was born July 21, 1943, in Cleveland, Ohio. He holds a B.A. from Ohio State University, as well as degrees from Case Western Reserve University and Georgetown University.

Russo was President of Capitol Consultants, Inc. From 1973 to 1975, he was Special Assistant to California Governor Ronald Reagan. In 1978, he founded and was named executive director and Treasurer of Campaign America, chaired by U.S. Senator Bob Dole. He went on to serve as Special Assistant to the President for Political Affairs from 1981 to 1983, and later as Deputy Under Secretary of Labor. He was later appointed by Ronald Reagan as Ambassador of the United States to Barbados, Dominica, St Lucia, Antigua, St. Vincent, and St. Christopher-Nevis-Anguilla from 1986 to 1988.

In 1991, he taught a course on the modern US presidency at Georgetown University's School for Continuing Education.

Russo currently serves as president on the Board of Layalina Productions and Paul Russo & Associates. Moreover, he has been a member of the Council of American Ambassadors, the Eastern International Academy, the National Easter Seal Society, the National Commission for Employment Policy and the Federal Advisory Council on Unemployment Insurance.

Diplomatic posts
| Preceded by Thomas H. Anderson, Jr. | United States Ambassador to Barbados; December 10, 1986-June 25, 1988 | Succeeded by G. Philip Hughes |
| Preceded by Thomas H. Anderson, Jr. | United States Ambassador to Dominica; 1986-1988 | Succeeded by G. Philip Hughes |
| Preceded by Thomas H. Anderson, Jr. | United States Ambassador to Saint Lucia; 1986-1988 | Succeeded by G. Philip Hughes |
| Preceded by Thomas H. Anderson, Jr. | United States Ambassador to Antigua; 1986-1988 | Succeeded by G. Philip Hughes |
| Preceded by Thomas H. Anderson, Jr. | United States Ambassador to St. Christopher-Nevis-Anguilla; 1986-1988 | Succeeded by G. Philip Hughes |
| Preceded by Thomas H. Anderson, Jr. | United States Ambassador to St. Vincent; 1986-1988 | Succeeded by G. Philip Hughes |
