= Earl Norfleet Phillips =

American diplomat (born 1940)

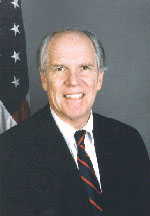

7th United States Ambassador to Antigua and Barbuda
- In office April 10, 2002 – June 1, 2003
- President: George W. Bush
- Preceded by: James A. Daley
- Succeeded by: Mary Kramer

Personal details
- Born: May 5, 1940 (age 86) High Point, North Carolina, U.S.
- Party: Republican
- Education: Woodberry Forest School
- Alma mater: University of North Carolina at Chapel Hill; Harvard University (MBA)
- Profession: Banker, diplomat

Earl Norfleet Phillips (born May 5, 1940) is an American diplomat who was Ambassador of the United States to Barbados, Dominica, Grenada, St Lucia, Antigua, St. Vincent, and St. Christopher-Nevis-Anguilla from 2002 to 2003, under George W. Bush.

== Biography ==
Earl Norfleet Phillips Jr. was born in High Point, North Carolina on May 5, 1940. He graduated from the University of North Carolina at Chapel Hill, and received an M.B.A. from Harvard Business School.

In 1972, he co-founded First Factors Corporation, a financial services business. He was also a partner in a real estate development company. From 1988 to 1998, he served on the board of Wachovia. From 1984 to 1992, he served on the North Carolina Economic Development Board. From 1990 to 1992, he served on the National Advisory Council of the Small Business Administration in Washington, D.C. From 1999 to 2000, he served as Chairman of North Carolina Citizens for Business and Industry. He was also Co-Chair of North Carolinians for Educational Opportunity 2000.

From 2002 to 2003, he served as Ambassador of the United States to Barbados, Dominica, St Lucia, Antigua, St. Vincent, and St. Christopher-Nevis-Anguilla.

Phillips was a trustee at the UNC at Chapel Hill and at the Asian Institute of Technology in Bangkok, Thailand. He has received the Global Leadership Award from Kenan-Flagler Business School. He is a member of the Council of American Ambassadors.

Diplomatic posts
| Preceded by James A. Daley | United States Ambassador to Barbados; 2002–2003 | Succeeded by Mary E. Kramer |
| Preceded by James A. Daley | United States Ambassador to Dominica; 2002–2003 | Succeeded by Mary E. Kramer |
| Preceded by James A. Daley | United States Ambassador to Saint Lucia; 2002–2003 | Succeeded by Mary E. Kramer |
| Preceded by James A. Daley | United States Ambassador to Antigua; 2002–2003 | Succeeded by Mary E. Kramer |
| Preceded by James A. Daley | United States Ambassador to Saint Kitts and Nevis; 2002–2003 | Succeeded by Mary E. Kramer |
| Preceded by James A. Daley | United States Ambassador to St. Vincent; 2002–2003 | Succeeded by Mary E. Kramer |
