= E. William Crotty =

American diplomat (1931–1999)

5th United States Ambassador to Antigua and Barbuda
- In office January 19, 1999 – October 10, 1999
- President: Bill Clinton
- Preceded by: Jeanette W. Hyde
- Succeeded by: James A. Daley

Personal details
- Born: Edmund William Crotty; June 28, 1931 Claremont, New Hampshire, U.S.
- Died: October 10, 1999 (aged 68) Gainesville, Florida, U.S.
- Education: Dartmouth College, University of Michigan Law School
- Occupation: attorney, diplomat
- Known for: US Ambassador to Caribbean islands

Edmund William Crotty (June 28, 1931 – October 10, 1999) was an American diplomat. A non-career appointee, he served concurrent appointments as the U.S. ambassador extraordinary and plenipotentiary to Antigua and Barbuda, Saint Lucia, Saint Vincent and the Grenadines, Saint Kitts and Nevis, Dominica, Grenada, and Barbados (Appointed: October 22, 1998, Presentation of Credentials: August 17, 1999, Termination of Mission: Died at Gainesville, Florida October 10, 1999). Before serving as ambassador, he was an attorney, chairman of the executive committee of the Democratic National Committee's board of directors and described as “a player in the highest levels of Democratic Party fund raising.”

== Life and career ==
Born on June 28, 1931, in Claremont, New Hampshire, Crotty grew up in nearby Bellows Falls, Vermont. He graduated as salutatorian at Bellows Falls High School and was the first five-sport letterman in Vermont school history. He attended Dartmouth College on a full academic scholarship and continued his education at the University of Michigan Law School, also on a scholarship. Crotty died from pneumonia in Gainesville, Florida, on October 10, 1999, at the age of 68.
