= Milan D. Bish =

American diplomat

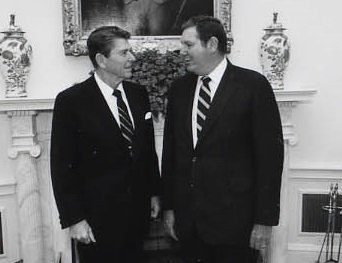

United States Ambassador to Barbados
- In office November 23, 1981 – March 4, 1984
- President: Ronald Reagan
- Preceded by: Sally Shelton-Colby
- Succeeded by: Thomas H. Anderson, Jr.

1st United States Ambassador to Antigua and Barbuda
- In office January 8, 1982 – March 4, 1984
- Preceded by: Position established
- Succeeded by: Thomas H. Anderson Jr.

Personal details
- Born: July 1, 1929 Harvard, Nebraska
- Died: November 5, 2001 (aged 72)
- Education: Hastings College (BA)

Milan D. Bish (July 1, 1929 – November 5, 2001) was an American diplomat. He was Ambassador of the United States to Barbados, Dominica, St Lucia, Antigua, and St. Vincent, as well as Special Representative to St. Christopher-Nevis-Anguilla from 1981 to 1984, under Ronald Reagan.

== Biography ==
Milan D. Bish was born in Harvard, Nebraska on July 1, 1929. He received a B.A. from Hastings College in 1950. He was President of Mid-Continent Enterprises, a real-estate company, and Bish Machinery Co., Bish and Son Cattle Co., and a highway commissioner for Nebraska. He then joined the Ronald Reagan transition team for the U.S. Department of the Interior before being appointed as Ambassador to Barbados, Dominica, Saint Lucia, Antigua, Saint Vincent, and Special Representative to St. Christopher-Nevis-Anguilla.

Diplomatic posts
Preceded by Sally Shelton-Colby	United States Ambassador to Barbados; November 23, 1981-March 4, 1984	Succeeded by Thomas H. Anderson, Jr.
Preceded by Sally Shelton-Colby	United States Ambassador to Dominica; November 23, 1981-March 4, 1984	Succeeded by Thomas H. Anderson, Jr.
Preceded by Sally Shelton-Colby	United States Ambassador to Saint Lucia; November 23, 1981-March 4, 1984	Succeeded by Thomas H. Anderson, Jr.
Preceded by Sally Shelton-Colby	United States Ambassador to Antigua; November 23, 1981-March 4, 1984	Succeeded by Thomas H. Anderson, Jr.
Preceded by Sally Shelton-Colby	United States Ambassador to St. Christopher-Nevis-Anguilla; November 23, 1981-March 4, 1984	Succeeded by Thomas H. Anderson, Jr.
Preceded by Sally Shelton-Colby	United States Ambassador to St. Vincent; November 23, 1981-March 4, 1984	Succeeded by Thomas H. Anderson, Jr.
