= Sally Shelton-Colby =

American diplomat

Sally Angela Shelton-Colby

United States Ambassador to Barbados
- In office June 7, 1979 – February 24, 1981 accredited to Antigua, Dominica, Grenada, St. Vincent, St. Kitts and Nevis and St. Lucia
- President: Jimmy Carter
- Preceded by: Frank V. Ortiz Jr.
- Succeeded by: Milan D. Bish

Personal details
- Born: August 29, 1944 (age 82) San Antonio, Texas, U.S.
- Party: Democratic
- Spouse(s): Eduardo Jimenez; William Colby
- Education: University of Missouri; Johns Hopkins University; Institut d'Études Politiques de Paris
- Profession: Diplomat, Professor

Sally Angela Shelton-Colby (born August 29, 1944) is an American diplomat. She was Ambassador of the United States to Barbados, Grenada and Dominica as well as Minister to St Lucia, and Special Representative to Antigua, St. Christopher-Nevis-Anguilla, and St. Vincent from 1979 to 1981, under Jimmy Carter.

== Early life ==
Sally Shelton-Colby was born on 29 August 1944 in San Antonio, Texas. She grew up in Monett, Missouri, where she was a cheerleader. One of her grandfathers was a personal friend of Texas Congressman Clark W. Thompson.

Shelton initially attended Southern Methodist University and tried to transfer to Princeton University, but she was rejected because they did not accept women. Instead, she transferred to the University of Missouri, where she received a B.A. in French. She received an MA in International relations from Johns Hopkins University's Paul H. Nitze School of Advanced International Studies (SAIS). She was also a Fulbright scholar at the Institut d'Études Politiques de Paris.

== Career ==
She worked as legislative assistant to Texas Senator Lloyd Bentsen during his 1976-onwards mandate. She was nominated to become United States Ambassador to El Salvador in 1977, but her nomination was rejected. However, she was confirmed to serve as the United States Ambassador to Grenada and Barbados from 1979 to 1981. In the Clinton administration, she was an Assistant Administrator of the United States Agency for International Development. She was also Deputy Secretary-General of the Organisation for Economic Co-operation and Development (OECD). She was Vice-President for the Bankers Trust in New York City. She also worked for Valero Energy Corporation.

She has taught at Georgetown University, Texas A&M University, the Pontifical Catholic University of Chile, American University and Harvard University’s John F. Kennedy School of Government. She currently teaches at American University in Washington, D.C.

She has been involved with Helen Keller International, the National Endowment for Democracy, the International Planned Parenthood Federation, the National Democratic Institute for International Affairs, the Atlantic Council of the U.S, the Center for International Environmental Law, the American Hospital of Paris, the Osgood Center for International Studies, the American Academy of Diplomacy, etc. She is currently a board member of the Pan American Health and Education Foundation and serves as Director of the La Pietra Coalition at Vital Voices.

== Personal life ==
Shelton-Colby met her first husband, Eduardo Jimenez, at the SAIS. He was a lawyer when they were married. After they divorced, he served as the Mexican Ambassador to Iceland and Norway. Shelton-Colby stated he was employed by President of Mexico Adolfo López Mateos and was a part of the Institutional Revolutionary Party (PRI).

She met her second husband, former Director of Central Intelligence William Colby, in 1982, when he was still married to his first wife, Barbara Colby. Their wedding took place in Italy in 1984. They lived in Georgetown, Washington, D.C. and remained married until his death in 1996. In 2011, she disavowed The Man Nobody Knew, a documentary directed and narrated by her stepson Carl Colby.

Diplomatic posts
Preceded by Frank V. Ortiz Jr.	United States Ambassador to Barbados; July 7, 1979 – February 24, 1981	Succeeded by Milan D. Bish
Preceded by Frank V. Ortiz Jr.	United States Ambassador to Grenada; July 23, 1979 – February 24, 1981	Succeeded by Charles A. Gillespie Jr.
Preceded by Frank V. Ortiz Jr.	United States Ambassador to Dominica; 1979–1981	Succeeded by Milan D. Bish
Preceded by Frank V. Ortiz Jr.	United States Ambassador to Saint Lucia; 1979–1981	Succeeded by Milan D. Bish
Preceded by Frank V. Ortiz Jr.	United States Ambassador to Antigua; 1979–1981	Succeeded by Milan D. Bish
Preceded by Frank V. Ortiz Jr.	United States Ambassador to St. Christopher-Nevis-Anguilla; 1979–1981	Succeeded by Milan D. Bish
Preceded by Frank V. Ortiz Jr.	United States Ambassador to St. Vincent; 1979–1981	Succeeded by Milan D. Bish
