= Thomas H. Anderson Jr. =

American diplomat (born 1946)

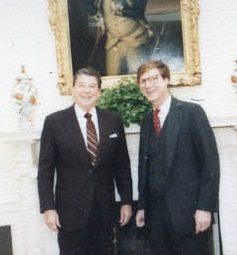
- 1984
- Born: March 17, 1946 (age 80); Gulfport, Mississippi, U.S.
- Education: University of Mississippi (BA)
- Occupation: Diplomat

Thomas H. Anderson Jr.

2nd United States Ambassador to Antigua and Barbuda
- In office August 16, 1984 – March 12, 1986
- Preceded by: Milan D. Bish
- Succeeded by: Paul A. Russo

Thomas H. Anderson Jr. (born March 17, 1946) is an American diplomat. He was Ambassador of the United States to Barbados, Dominica, St Lucia, Antigua, St. Vincent, and St. Christopher-Nevis-Anguilla from 1984 to 1986 under U.S. President Ronald W. Reagan.

== Biography ==
Anderson was born in Gulfport, Mississippi. He received a Bachelor of Arts in 1968 from the University of Mississippi at Oxford. He is a member of Epsilon Xi chapter of Sigma Nu fraternity at the University of Mississippi. Anderson served in the Mississippi National Guard before joining Hancock Bank.

He worked as assistant to the vice president of the Hancock Bank in Gulfport from 1969 to 1972. From 1972 to 1984, Anderson was an assistant to U.S. Representative Trent Lott of Mississippi's 5th congressional district, since the 4th district. He was also a member of the Southern Federal Savings and Loan Association in Gulfport.

After his ambassadorships, Anderson ran for the U.S. House of Representatives in a 1989 special election after Republican Congressman Larkin I. Smith died in a plane crash. In the primary, he took a strong second place to Democratic state Senator Gene Taylor and Democratic state Attorney General Mike Moore, but lost in the runoff to Taylor by a two-to-one margin. Afterwards, he was chief of staff to then United States Senator Trent Lott. Anderson is the chairman of the board of Team Washington, Inc.

Diplomatic posts
| Preceded by Milan D. Bish | United States Ambassador to Barbados; May 3, 1984-March 12, 1986 | Succeeded by Paul A. Russo |
| Preceded by Milan D. Bish | United States Ambassador to Dominica; 1984-1986 | Succeeded by Paul A. Russo |
| Preceded by Milan D. Bish | United States Ambassador to Saint Lucia; 1984-1986 | Succeeded by Paul A. Russo |
| Preceded by Milan D. Bish | United States Ambassador to Antigua; 1984-1984 | Succeeded by Paul A. Russo |
| Preceded by Milan D. Bish | United States Ambassador to St. Christopher-Nevis-Anguilla; 1984-1986 | Succeeded by Paul A. Russo |
| Preceded by Milan D. Bish | United States Ambassador to St. Vincent; 1984-1986 | Succeeded by Paul A. Russo |
