= Theodore R. Britton Jr. =

American diplomat (born 1925)

Theodore Roosevelt Britton Jr. (born October 17, 1925) is an American former government official. He was a non-career appointee who served concurrent appointments as the American Ambassador Extraordinary and Plenipotentiary to Grenada and Barbados from 1974 until 1977.

== Life and career ==
Britton was born in North Augusta, South Carolina on October 17, 1925. In 1936, Britton moved with his parents, Bessie B. and Theodore R. Britton, Sr., to New York City. He left high school and joined the US Marine Corps in January 1944, fighting in the Pacific Theatre during World War II. When he returned, he studied at New York University. Soon after he was recalled to serve in the Korean War and later returned to NYU and graduated with a bachelor's degree in Banking and Finance. Britton worked as a mortgage officer and head of the mortgage department at Carver Federal Savings and Loan Association from 1955 to 1964 before becoming president of the American Baptist Convention. At the invitation of Harry Finger, who was head of Research and Technology in the Department of Housing and Urban Development (HUD), Britton joined HUD as the Deputy Assistant Secretary for Research and Technology in 1971. Gerald R. Ford nominated him to serve as the U.S. Ambassador to Barbados and Grenada and as the U. S. Special Representative to Antigua, Dominica, St. Christopher-Nevis, Anguilla, St. Lucia and St. Vincent and the Grenadines on November 17, 1974. He resigned in May 1977.

Ronald Reagan appointed Britton to serve as chairman of the U.S.-China–Soviet Union Agreement on Housing and Planning (1981 to 1989). He was awarded the Congressional Gold Medal on June 27, 2012 for his WWII service.

== Controversy ==
Britton was not expected “to take his job for more than it was - a political plum appointment by President Ford of a black Republican for services rendered.” But it did not work out so well. Prime Minister Errol Barrow referred to him as "the ugly American" and others there as "the king of Barbados,". The State Department's Foreign Service Inspector investigated on charges of incompetence.

Other allegations included that he "punished and humiliated" an embassy official who disagreed with his policies and angering the Barbados government by becoming too involved in local politics, upstaging government officials at their own gatherings and publicly criticizing Barbados officials. He was criticized for bringing in a contingent of Marines for the first time since the U.S. mission was established in 1821. He gloated to one visitor "Did you notice 'em? Did you see what they did when I came in? Yeah, they saluted. It adds a sense of respect to the place."

Britton disputed The Washington Post's version of what happened and said there was no intention of recalling him.
