= History of the Central Intelligence Agency =

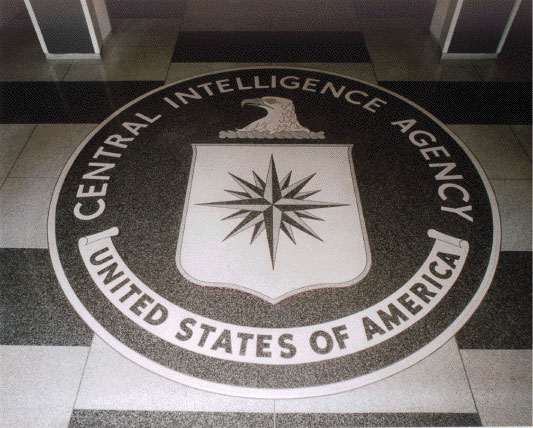
Central Intelligence Agency seal

The Central Intelligence Agency (CIA) is a civilian foreign intelligence service of the United States federal government. It is responsible for collecting, analyzing, and disseminating intelligence to support national security, primarily through overseas operations and sources. The agency was established by the National Security Act of 1947, enacted in response to intelligence coordination failures identified during World War II, including the attack on Pearl Harbor.

The CIA succeeded wartime intelligence organizations such as the Office of Strategic Services (OSS) and subsequent transitional bodies that assumed intelligence responsibilities prior to the agency's formal establishment. Since its founding, the CIA has played a central role in U.S. intelligence operations, including strategic analysis, espionage, and covert operations. Its development has been shaped by evolving geopolitical priorities, statutory authorities, and oversight mechanisms.

The lives of 139 CIA officers who died in the line of duty are commemorated by 139 stars engraved on the CIA Memorial Wall in the Original Headquarters Building.

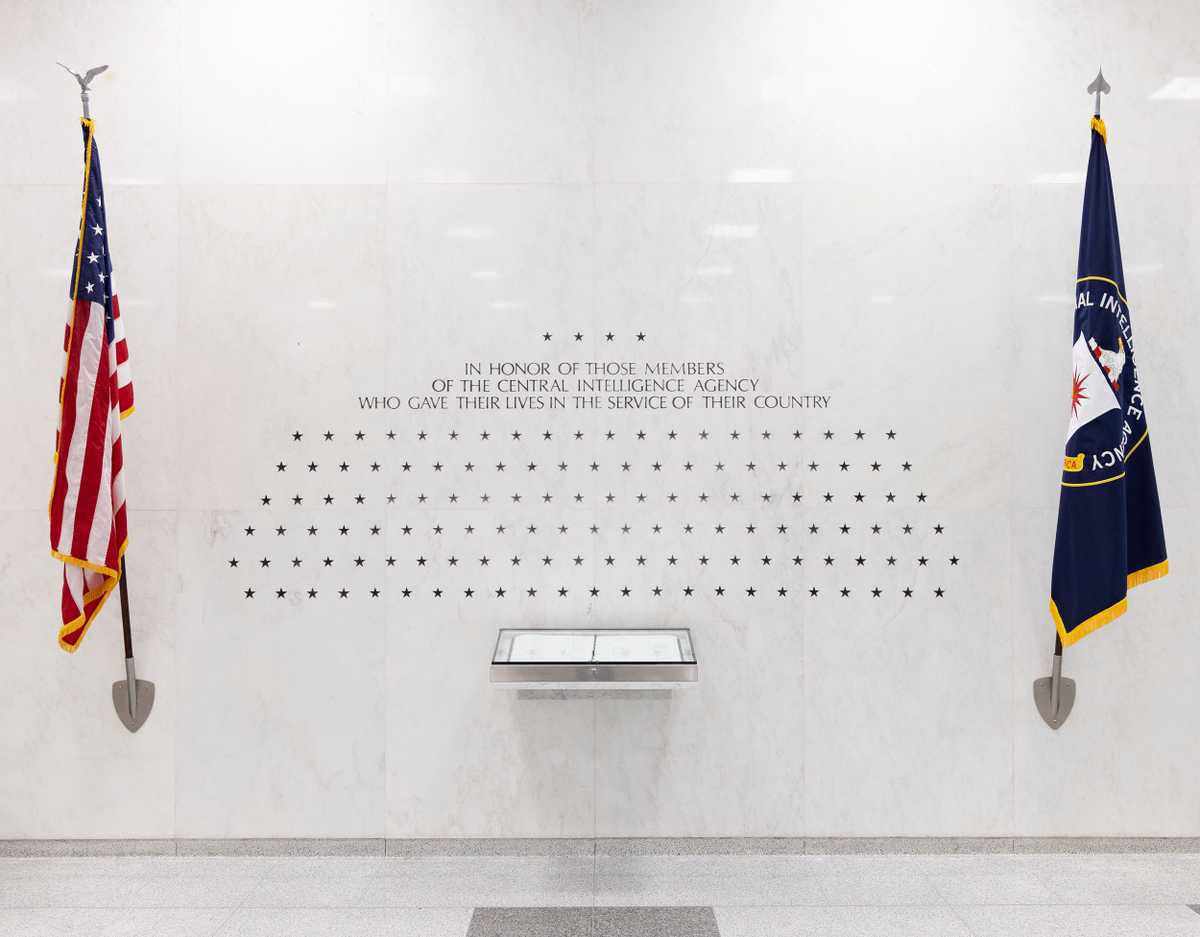
The lives of 139 fallen CIA officers are represented by 139 stars on the CIA Memorial Wall in the Original Headquarters building in Langley, Virginia.

== Origins (1941–1945) ==
The Central Intelligence Agency (CIA) was formally established on September 18, 1947, when President Harry S. Truman signed the National Security Act of 1947 into law. A principal catalyst for its creation was the attack on Pearl Harbor. In the final stages of World War II, U.S. officials recognized the need for a centralized body to coordinate intelligence activities. Several agencies – including the Federal Bureau of Investigation (FBI), the State Department, the War Department, and the United States Post Office – contended for this responsibility.

On November 18, 1944, General William Joseph Donovan, head of the Office of Strategic Services (OSS), wrote to President Franklin D. Roosevelt proposing the establishment of a peacetime foreign intelligence service. Donovan argued that such an organization should obtain intelligence through both overt and covert means, provide strategic intelligence guidance, determine national intelligence objectives, and coordinate information collected by all government agencies." Donovan's letter was prompted by a query from General Dwight Eisenhower's Chief of Staff regarding the nature of the role of the OSS within the military establishment. Following this, Roosevelt ordered his chief military aide to conduct a secret investigation, and report of the OSS's World War II operations. Around this time, stories about the OSS began circulating in the news media, including claims that the OSS was an "American Gestapo." The report and investigation were extremely critical towards the agency, and determined that "use [of the OSS] as a secret intelligence agency in the post-war world [would be] inconceivable". Before the report was finished, the President had already ordered the Joint Chiefs to shelve their plans for a Central Intelligence Service even before the April release of the report.

On September 20, 1945, the OSS, which once numbered almost 13,000 staff, was set to be dismantled. However, a reprieve was granted six days later by the Assistant Secretary of War, that instead reduced the OSS to roughly 15% of its peak force level. This forced the organization to close many of its foreign offices; at the same time, the name of the service was changed from the OSS to the Strategic Services Unit.

== Immediate predecessors, 1946–1947 ==
During World War II, President Roosevelt was concerned about American covert intelligence capabilities, particularly in light of the success of Churchill's Commandos. Following the suggestion of a senior British intelligence officer, Roosevelt asked Colonel William "Wild Bill" Donovan to devise a combined intelligence service modeled on the British Secret Intelligence Service (MI6) and Special Operations Executive. This resulted in the creation of the Office of Strategic Services (OSS). On September 20, 1945, President Harry S. Truman signed Executive Order 9621, requiring the dissolution of the OSS by October 1, 1945. Soon after, the functions of the OSS were split between the Departments of State and War.

| New unit | Oversight | OSS functions absorbed |
|---|---|---|
| Strategic Services Unit (SSU) | War Department | Secret Intelligence (SI) (i.e., clandestine intelligence collection) and counter-espionage (X-2) |
| Interim Research and Intelligence Service (IRIS) | State Department | Research and Analysis Branch (i.e., intelligence analysis) |
| Psychological Warfare Division (PWD) (not uniquely for former OSS) | War Department, Army General Staff | Staff officers from Operational Groups, Operation Jedburgh, Morale Operations (black propaganda) |

The three-way division lasted only a few months. The first public mention of the "Central Intelligence Agency" term appeared in 1945, in a U.S. Army and Navy command-restructuring proposal presented by James Forrestal and Arthur Radford to the U.S. Senate Military Affairs Committee. Despite opposition from the military establishment, the Department of State, and the Federal Bureau of Investigation (FBI), President Truman established the National Intelligence Authority (NIA) on January 22, 1946 by presidential directive. This was the direct predecessor to the CIA. The NIA and its operational extension, the Central Intelligence Group (CIG), were disestablished after twenty months. The assets of the SSU, which now constituted a streamlined "nucleus" of clandestine intelligence, were transferred to the CIG in mid-1946 and reconstituted as the Office of Special Operations (OSO).

== Legislative foundation ==
Lawrence Houston, the first General Counsel of the Central Intelligence Agency, John S. Warner, and Walter Pforzheimer were concerned that the agency lacked a clear legal basis approved by Congress. With the support of CIA Director Hoyt Vandenberg, Houston helped draft the National Security Act of 1947. The act, which took effect on 18 September 1947, formally created both the National Security Council and the Central Intelligence Agency.

In 1949, Houston and his two assistant general counsels helped draft the Central Intelligence Agency Act (Public Law 81-110). This law authorized the CIA to use confidential budgetary and administrative procedures and exempted the agency from standard restrictions governing the use of federal funds. It also exempted the CIA from public disclosure requirements related to its internal organization, personnel, and salaries.

The act further established a program commonly known as PL-110, which allowed the CIA to manage defectors, and other individuals considered essential to U.S. intelligence operations, who did not qualify under standard immigration laws. The program provided these individuals with legal status, cover identities, and financial support.

== New director ==
In July 1946, Hoyt Vandenberg reorganized the Central Reports Staff into the Office of Reports and Estimates (ORE). The office produced finished intelligence reports based on State Department telegrams, military dispatches, and internal CIG reporting reviewed by specialist analysts.

The ORE's main publications were the Daily Summary and the Weekly Summary. It also produced Intelligence Highlights for internal use and Intelligence Memorandums for the Director of Central Intelligence (DCI), who controlled their distribution. These publications made up most of the ORE's work.

Vandenberg left the CIA on April 30, 1948, to become the commander of the newly established Air Force. He was succeeded by Roscoe Hillenkoetter, who reorganized the ORE into three divisions: Global Survey, Current Intelligence, and Estimates. Current Intelligence remained the office's primary focus.

The ORE expanded its output with the introduction of Situation Reports, used as country reference guides, and the monthly Review of the World Situation. It continued to receive requests from the National Security Council, the Joint Chiefs of Staff, the Department of State, and the military services.

A continuing limitation was the ORE's emphasis on short-term reporting. Of its eleven regular publications, only one addressed long-term strategic intelligence, and much of the reporting relied on open sources. Before the North Korean invasion in June 1950, the CIA had only a small number of officers in Korea, none reporting directly to analytical branches.

After the outbreak of the Korean War, these weaknesses drew increased attention. On August 21, 1950, President Truman appointed Walter Bedell Smith as Director of the CIA to strengthen the Agency's intelligence capabilities.

== Intelligence vs. action ==
Initially, the CIA was subordinate to other entities in the US Government. However, Truman, who found himself overwhelmed by the sheer number of state, DOD, and FBI reports (the FBI having jurisdiction in Latin America) quickly saw the need for a centralized outlet to organize the information that would reach his desk. The DOD relied on the CIA to gather intelligence on military adversaries, perform sabotage, and support insurgents. The State Department wanted the CIA to support global political change beneficial to the US. Organizationally, this gave the CIA two areas of responsibility: Covert Action and Covert Intelligence.

=== Office of Special Operations (Covert Intelligence) ===
Sidney Souers, formerly Deputy Chief of Naval Intelligence, served briefly as the first Director of the Central Intelligence Group (CIG). During his tenure, the CIG received little cooperation from other U.S. government agencies, including the Department of Defense, the Department of State, and the Federal Bureau of Investigation. Souers resigned after leaving a note emphasizing the urgent need to develop high-quality intelligence on the Soviet Union.

He was succeeded by General Hoyt Vandenberg, a former commander of U.S. air operations in Europe, and later an intelligence adviser to President Dwight D. Eisenhower. While awaiting appointment as the first Chief of Staff of the Air Force, Vandenberg became the CIG's second director. He established the Office of Special Operations (OSO) and the Office of Reports and Estimates (ORE).

The OSO was tasked with overseas espionage and subversion, and operated with a reported budget of $15 million. Vandenberg directed intelligence collection on Soviet military forces in Eastern and Central Europe, relying on approximately 228 personnel stationed in Germany, Austria, Switzerland, Poland, Czechoslovakia, and Hungary. Later internal reviews found that much of the early reporting from this period was inaccurate.

=== Office of Policy Coordination (Covert Action) ===
The New York Times reported on the CIA's first operation. The article noted the arrest of a CIA agent connected to the Romanian National Peasants' Party, along with the arrest of the party's leaders on the charge of treason.

On June 18, 1948, the National Security Council issued Directive 10/2 "[calling] for covert operations to attack the Soviets around the world," and giving the CIA the authority to carry out covert operations "against hostile foreign states or groups or in support of friendly foreign states or groups but which are so planned and conducted that any U.S. government responsibility for them is not evident to unauthorized persons and that if uncovered the US Government can plausibly disclaim any responsibility for them." To fulfill this directive, the Office of Policy Coordination was created inside the new CIA. The organizational structure of OPC was quite unique. Frank Wisner, the head of the OPC, answered not to the DI, but to the secretaries of defense, state, and the NSC. OPC's actions were kept secret from the CIA director. Most CIA stations had two station chiefs: one for the OSO and one for the OPC. Their relationship was competitive, even poaching each other's agents. It was a lopsided competition, with the better funded OPC often claiming victory.

== Early successes and failures ==
In the early years of the Cold War, the CIA achieved a limited number of operational successes. Failures include the gradual Soviet takeover of Romania, the Soviet takeover of Czechoslovakia, the Soviet blockade of Berlin, failed assessments of the Soviet atomic bomb project, and the Korean War. American intelligence also suffered from infiltration. The famous double agent Kim Philby was also the British liaison to American Central Intelligence. Through him, the CIA coordinated hundreds of airdrop operations inside the iron curtain. They were then compromised and sabotaged by Philby. There were spies in the Manhattan Project and Arlington Hall. The nerve center of CIA cryptanalysis was compromised by William Weisband, a Russian translator and Soviet spy. The CIA continued to use the tactic of dropping plant agents behind enemy lines by parachute again on China and North Korea, but this too, was compromised.

Cryptanalysis was not the CIA's sole success story. In the 1948 Italian election, the CIA quietly backed the Christian Democrats. James Forrestal and Allen Dulles collected donations from around Wall Street and Washington, D.C., then Forrestal went to the Secretary of the Treasury, John W. Snyder, a Truman stalwart. He allowed them to tap the $200 million Exchange Stabilization Fund, which had been designed during the Depression to shore up the value of the dollar overseas. It was used during World War II as a depository for captured Axis Loot, and was, at that time, earmarked for the reconstruction of Europe. Funds moved from the fund into the bank accounts of wealthy Americans, many of whom had Italian heritage. Hard cash was then distributed to Catholic Action, the Vatican's political arm, and directly to Italian politicians. "A long romance between the party and the agency began. The CIA's practice of purchasing elections and politicians with bags of cash was repeated in Italy – and in many other nations – for the next twenty-five years."

== Korean War ==
During the Korean War, on Yong-Do island in Busan, Hans V. Tofte had turned over a thousand North Korean expatriates into what the National Security Council hoped would become a fifth column. They were divided into three task groups: Intelligence gathering through infiltration, guerrilla warfare, and pilot rescue. The infiltration teams were unsuccessful, yet Tofte continuously filed reports indicating success in operations.

Seoul Station Chief, and Army Colonel Albert Haney, openly celebrated the capabilities of those agents and they gathered. Seoul State Department intelligence officers were skeptical, and Haney was replaced in September 1952 by John Limond Hart, a Europe veteran with a vivid memory for bitter experiences of misinformation. Hart was immediately suspicious of the successes reported by Tofte and Haney.

After a three-month investigation, Hart determined that the entirety of the station's product from Korean sources was misinformation. Some of these reports included those praised by American military commanders as "one of the outstanding intelligence reports of the war." Another part of the problem was the isolation of North Korea, and its relative lack of importance compared to China and Japan, which led to a deficiency in Korean language skills. After the war, internal reviews by the CIA corroborated Hart's findings: the CIA's Seoul station had 200 officers, but not a single speaker of Korean.

Hart reported to Washington that the Seoul station was hopeless, and could not be salvaged. Loftus Becker, Deputy Director of Intelligence, was sent personally to tell Hart that the CIA had to keep the station open to save face. Becker returned to Washington, pronounced the situation to be "hopeless", and reported that, after touring the CIA's Far East operations, he had found that the CIA's ability to gather intelligence in the far east was "almost negligible". Following this, he resigned. Frank Wisner put the Korean failures down to a need "to develop the quantity and kind of people we must have if we are to successfully carry out the heavy burdens which have been placed on us." A compounding factor was that, even at the height of the Korean war, the CIA kept its primary focus on Europe and the Soviet Union.

=== China ===
With the Chinese push, the eyes of the NSC turned north. With surplus funding, the CIA explored every option in China, from Chiang Kai-shek's promise of a million Kuomintang, to the western Chinese Muslim Horsemen of the Hui clans who had ties to Chinese Nationalists. The CIA ran operations from White Dog Island with the nationalists for months, until it was discovered that the nationalist commander's Chief of Staff was a spy for Mao. $50 million went to Okinawa-based Chinese refugees to obtain sizable support on the mainland. In July 1952, the CIA sent a team of expatriates in. They were ambushed 4 months later.

The CIA turned to nationalist General Li Mi in Burma. When Li Mi's troops crossed the border into China, an ambush awaited them as well. The CIA later discovered that Li Mi's Bangkok radioman worked for Mao. Li Mi's men retreated to Burma and set up a global heroin empire in Burma's Golden Triangle.

== Iran ==
In 1951, Mohammad Mosaddegh, a member of the National Front, rose to power campaigning for khal'-e yad (Law of repossession, i.e. oil nationalization). This was against the Gass-Golsha`iyan (supplemental oil agreement), which Prime Minister Razmara supported. The supplemental oil agreement with the Anglo-Iranian Oil Company received several concessions from the AIOC, including a 50/50 profit split, as well as other concessions for better Iranian representation within the company. Razmara was assassinated in March 1951. Khalil Tahmassebi, a member of a terrorist group, was charged for it. The next day, over 8,000 members of the National Front and the Marxist Tudeh party protested his arrest. The protesters threatened to kill the Shah, any Iranian legislator who opposes oil nationalization, and anyone responsible for the imprisonment of Tahmassebi. Mosaddeq was elected to replace the now dead PM, but conditioned his acceptance on the nationalization of oil, which went through unanimously.

Nationalization of the British funded Iranian oil industry, including the largest oil refinery in the world, is widely recognized as a failure. A British naval embargo successfully shuttered the British oil facilities. Iran had no skilled workers to operate the British facilities, and no way of exporting the product. In 1952, Mosaddeq bucked against royal refusal to approve his Minister of War, aiming to take control of the military from the Shah. Mosaddeq resigned in protest, and the Shah installed Ahmad Qavam as PM. Again, the National Front and Tudeh took to the streets, threatening assassinations (four Iranian Prime Ministers had been assassinated in the last few years). Five days later, the military feared losing control and pulled their troops back, and the Shah gave in to Mosaddeq's demands. Mosaddeq quickly replaced military leaders loyal to the Shah with those loyal to him, giving him personal control over the military. Mosaddeq took six months of emergency powers, giving him the power to unilaterally pass legislation. When that expired, his powers were extended for another year.

Ayatollah Kashani, who once decried the unforgivable abuses of the British, and Mozzafar Baghai, Mosaddeq's closest political ally, and a man who personally took part in the physical takeover of the largest oil refinery in the world, now found that which they once saw in Mosaddeq, in the British. Mosaddeq began manipulating the Iranian Parliament, but his supporters left quickly. To prevent the loss of his control of parliament, Mosaddeq dismissed parliament, and, at the same time, took dictatorial powers. This power grab triggered the Shah to exercise his constitutional right to dismiss Mosaddeq, who then promptly started a military coup as the Shah fled the country.

As was typical of CIA operations, CIA interventions were preceded by radio announcements on July 7, 1953, made by the CIA's intended victim by way of operational leaks. On August 19, a CIA-paid mob led by Ayatollahs Khomeini and Kashani sparked what the deputy chief of mission of the U.S. Tehran Embassy called "an almost spontaneous revolution."... But Mosaddeq was protected by his new inner military circle, and the CIA had been unable to get any sway within the Iranian military. Their chosen man, former general Zahedi, had no troops to call on. General McClure, commander of the American military assistance advisory group, would get his second star by buying the loyalty of the Iranian officers he was training. An attack on Mosaddeq's house forced him to flee. He surrendered the next day, and his military coup came to an end. The end result was a 60/40 oil profit split in favor of Iran (possibly similar to agreements with Saudi Arabia and Venezuela).

== Guatemala ==
The success of returning the Shah to power triggered planning for Operation Success: a plan to replace Guatemalan President Jacobo Arbenz with Carlos Armas. The plan was exposed in major newspapers, when the CIA agent liaison to Armas left plans for the coup in his Guatemala City hotel room. Operation Success was successful due to two key incidents. When Guatemalan state radio went down for scheduled antenna replacement, the CIA's "Voice of Liberation" radio broadcast moved to replace it. Speaker of the House John McCormack called a Czech shipment of weapons bypassing the U.S. arms embargo on Guatemala an "atomic bomb planted in America's backyard." Contrary to contemporary claims of the CIA, the shipment would reach Guatemala undetected, but the shipment was mostly rusted junk from World War II.

Armas struck on June 18th. Armas' offensive was ineffectual, so Arbenz was apprehensive about the possibility of future successful attacks, and future betrayal from the military. On June 22, Allen Dulles walked into the Oval Office, certain that only drastic measures could unseat Arbenz, and salvage the situation. In the meeting they said that a filibuster by the chairman of Democrats for Eisenhower, one of Ike's richest and most generous contributors, was their last hope. A withdrawal of $150,000 from Riggs Bank purchased three fully armed P-47 Thunderbolts. On June 27, after days of the miniature bombing campaign, Arbenz, believing his forces outmatched, and that his grasp on the military was failing, ceded power to Colonel Carlos Diaz. The CIA orchestrated several transfers of power, ending when the CIA finally placed Castillo Armas in the office of President.

== Syria ==
In 1949, Colonel Adib Shishakli rose to power in Syria in a CIA-backed coup. Four years later, he was overthrown by the military, Ba'athists, and communists. The CIA and MI6 started funding right-wing members of the military, but suffered a large setback in the aftermath of the Suez Crisis. CIA Agent Rocky Stone, who had played a minor role in the 1953 Iranian coup d'état, was working at the Damascus embassy as a diplomat, but was actually the Station Chief. Syrian officers, backed by the CIA, quickly appeared on television, stating that they had received money from the "corrupt and sinister Americans" in an attempt to overthrow the legitimate government of Syria" Syrian forces surrounded the embassy and rousted Agent Stone, who confessed, and subsequently made history as the first American diplomat expelled from an Arab nation. This strengthened ties between Syria and Egypt, helping establish the United Arab Republic, and poisoning the well for the US for the foreseeable future. The inability to deny the complicity of the U.S. government put this operation outside the charter of the CIA.

== Indonesia ==
During the Cold War, the United States grew concerned about Indonesia under President Sukarno, who sought to remain neutral rather than align with either the United States or the Soviet Union. Sukarno was a leader of the Non-Aligned Movement and hosted the 1955 Bandung Conference, which brought together countries trying to stay outside the Cold War power blocs.

U.S. officials feared that Indonesia might move closer to communism, particularly because the Indonesian Communist Party (PKI) was gaining influence. Although the U.S. ambassador believed Sukarno was still open to cooperation with the West, the CIA viewed the situation as unstable. In 1957, President Dwight D. Eisenhower approved covert action aimed at weakening Sukarno's government, and supporting regional rebel groups.

The operation failed and became publicly exposed. CIA-backed efforts included secret arms shipments and air attacks, which were revealed in 1958 when an American pilot, Allen Pope, was shot down and captured. His arrest made U.S. involvement undeniable, and forced the operation to end.

The failed intervention in Indonesia damaged confidence in the CIA. President Eisenhower, and later internal reviews, criticized the agency for poor judgment and flawed intelligence, making Indonesia a widely cited example of a Cold War intelligence failure.

== Congo ==
The Congo became independent from Belgium in 1960. The United States feared that its new prime minister, Patrice Lumumba, was susceptible to Soviet influence, so the CIA supported Joseph Mobutu in organizing a coup that deposed Lumumba on September 14, 1960. Lumumba was assassinated by his Congolese and Belgian enemies in 1961, with CIA acquiescence. The CIA continued to back the Mobutu regime throughout the Cold War, despite its corruption, mismanagement, and human rights abuses.

== Gary Powers U-2 Shoot down ==
The Bomber gap was followed by the Missile gap. Eisenhower wanted to use the U-2 to disprove the missile gap, but he had banned U-2 overflights of the USSR, after the successful meeting at Camp David with Nikita Khrushchev. Another reason Eisenhower objected to the use of the U-2 was that, in the nuclear age, the U.S. would face a paralysis of intelligence without information on the Soviets' intentions. Eisenhower was particularly worried that U-2 flights could be seen as preparation for first strike attacks as he had high hopes for an upcoming meeting with Khrushchev in Paris. Conflicted, Eisenhower finally gave into CIA pressure to authorize a 16-day window for flights, which, because of poor weather, was later extended for another six days. On May 1, 1960, the USSR shot down a U-2 piloted by Gary Powers, which had been flying through Soviet airspace. To Ike, the ensuing cover-up destroyed one of his biggest assets, his perceived honesty, and the biggest hope he had, leaving a legacy of thawing relations with Khrushchev. It also marked the beginning of a long downward slide in the credibility of the Office of the President of the United States. Eisenhower later said that the U-2 cover-up was the greatest regret of his presidency.

== Dominican Republic ==
The human rights abuses of Generalissimo Rafael Trujillo had a history of more than three decades, but in August 1960, the United States severed diplomatic relations. The CIA's Special Group had decided to arm the Dominicans in hopes of an assassination. The CIA had dispersed three rifles and three .38 revolvers, but things paused as President John F. Kennedy assumed office. An order approved by Kennedy resulted in the dispersal of four machine guns. Trujillo died from gunshot wounds two weeks later. In the aftermath, Robert Kennedy wrote that the CIA had succeeded where it had failed many times in the past, but in the face of that success, it was caught flatfooted, having failed to plan what to do next.

== Cuba ==
The CIA welcomed Fidel Castro on his visit to Washington D.C. and gave him a face-to-face briefing. The CIA hoped that Castro would bring about a friendly democratic government and planned to curry his favor with money and guns. On December 11, 1959, a memo reached the DI's desk recommending Castro's "elimination". Dulles replaced the word "elimination" with "removal" and set the wheels in motion. By mid August 1960, Richard Bissell (then CIA's Deputy Director for Plans) sought, with the blessing of the CIA, to hire the Mafia to assassinate Castro. At the same time, his men were working on a parallel plan: recruiting a Cuban exile to assassinate him. A little while later, the FBI advised the CIA that it would be impossible to overthrow Castro with these chatty Cuban exiles. In the days before the Bay of Pigs and during the invasion, Richard Bissell lied to everyone. He lied to Adlai Stevenson and to the people commanding the mission, guaranteeing them air support while he lied to the President, promising success and minimal air support.

The Taylor Board was commissioned to determine what went wrong in Cuba. The board came to the same conclusion that the January 1961 President's Board of Consultants on Foreign Intelligence Activities, and many other reviews prior, had: that Covert Action had to be completely isolated from intelligence and analysis. The Inspector General of the CIA investigated the Bay of Pigs. His conclusion was that there was a need to drastically improve the organization and management of the CIA. The Special Group (later renamed the 303 committee) was convened in an oversight role.

=== Cuban Missile Crisis ===
Subsequent to the shoot-downs of the may day U-2 reconnaissance plane and a later shoot-down in China, Kennedy ordered a 45-day cessation of U-2 flights, including flights over Cuba that had recently discovered the first Soviet high altitude surface-to-air missile launcher site. There were fears of antagonism, and an election was around the corner. During this "photo gap", the CIA received a report from a source from Operation Mongoose, a road watcher describing covered tractor-trailers moving that were shaped like large telephone poles. Control of U-2 flights was moved to the Air Force, and on October 14, U-2 flights resumed. The Cuban Missile Crisis formally started the next day when American photo analysts identified R-12 1 Megaton MRBMs, which could target parts of the east coast with its 2,000 km range. R-14s, which could target most of the continental US, as well as 9M21 tactical nukes, had also been deployed.

== Capture and Execution of Che Guevara (1967) ==
On October 9, 1967, Che Guevara was captured by Bolivian soldiers while attempting to aid a guerrilla uprising. According to since-declassified documents, the soldiers who captured Guevara were armed and trained by the CIA and the Green Berets. A memorandum from National Security Advisor Walt Rostow to President Lyndon B. Johnson suggests that the Bolivian unit that captured and killed Guevara was "the one we have been training for some time." Another memo from Rostow to Johnson from October 11, 1967 confirms the claims of the previous memo, stating that the execution of Guevara "shows the soundness of our 'preventative medicine' assistance to countries facing incipient insurgency--it was the Bolivian 2nd Ranger Battalion, trained by our Green Berets from June–September of this year that cornered him and got him." The memorandum also concluded that Guevara's death "marks the passing of another of the aggressive romantic revolutionaries like Sukarno, Nkrumah, Ben Bella, and reinforces this trend."

The role of the CIA is further detailed in a memo dated 3 June 1975, which recounts the debriefing of CIA operative Félix Rodríguez. In his statement, Rodriguez states that he was sent to Bolivia by the CIA to assist in the capture of Guevara and his band of guerrillas. According to Rodriguez, he and a fellow Cuban-American operative "were issued false U.S. re-entry permits" under fake names, after which they were flown to Bolivia and introduced to the Commander-in-Chief of the Bolivian armed forces as "experts on guerrilla warfare." The two men received Bolivian uniforms and credentials as "captains in the Bolivian army", as well as weapons. However, "despite their apparent status as Bolivian officers," they "never were given orders by higher-ranking Bolivian officers." Rodriguez goes on to claim that, once they had captured Guevara and brought him to the village of La Higuera, he was given the order to "execute Guevara in any manner which he might choose." Rodriguez was the senior "Bolivian officer" in Higueras and oversaw the Guevara's execution; Rodriguez "told a sergeant of the order to execute Guevara and entrusted the mission to him. He was told to fire below the head," and at 1:20 PM, Rodriguez "heard the shots fired at Guevara."

Following the execution, Rodriguez and his co-conspirator were exfiltrated via American military aircraft, first to Santa Cruz, then to Panama, then to Charlotte, North Carolina, and finally to Miami, where Rodriguez "briefed General Cushman... on his personal role in the execution of Guevara."

== Early Cold War, 1953–1966 ==
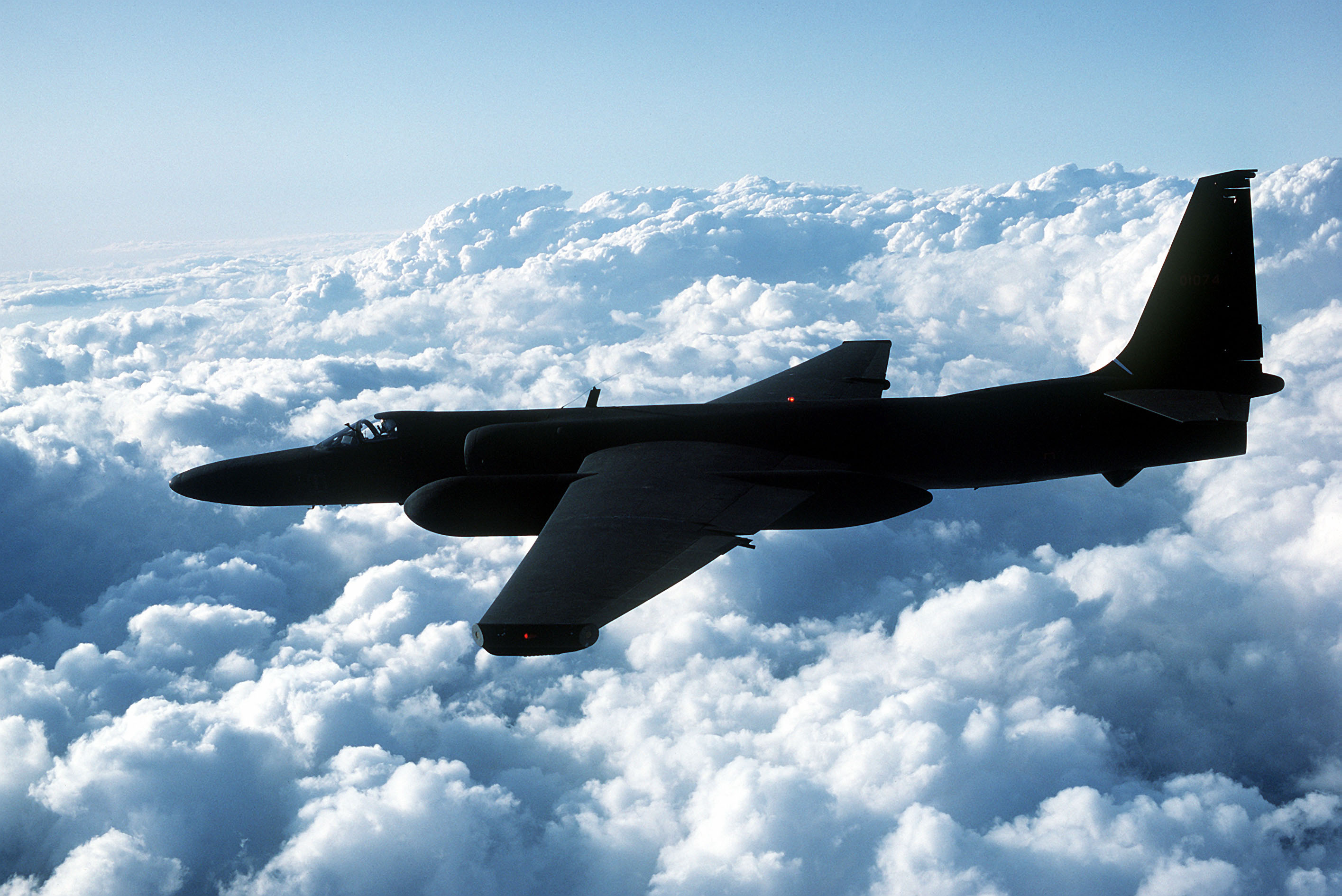
Lockheed U-2 "Dragon Lady", the first generation of near-space reconnaissance aircraft

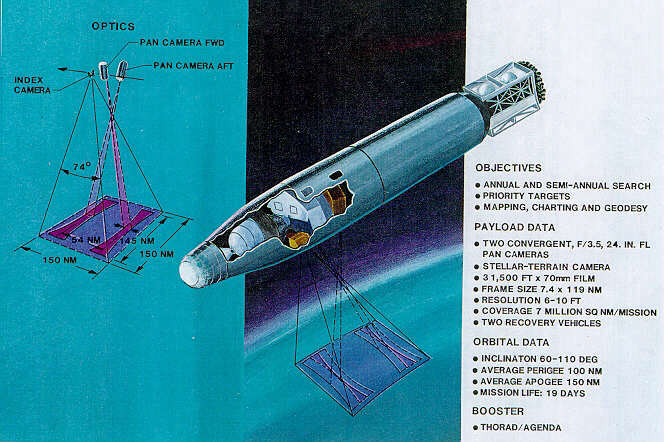
Early CORONA/KH-4B imagery IMINT satellite

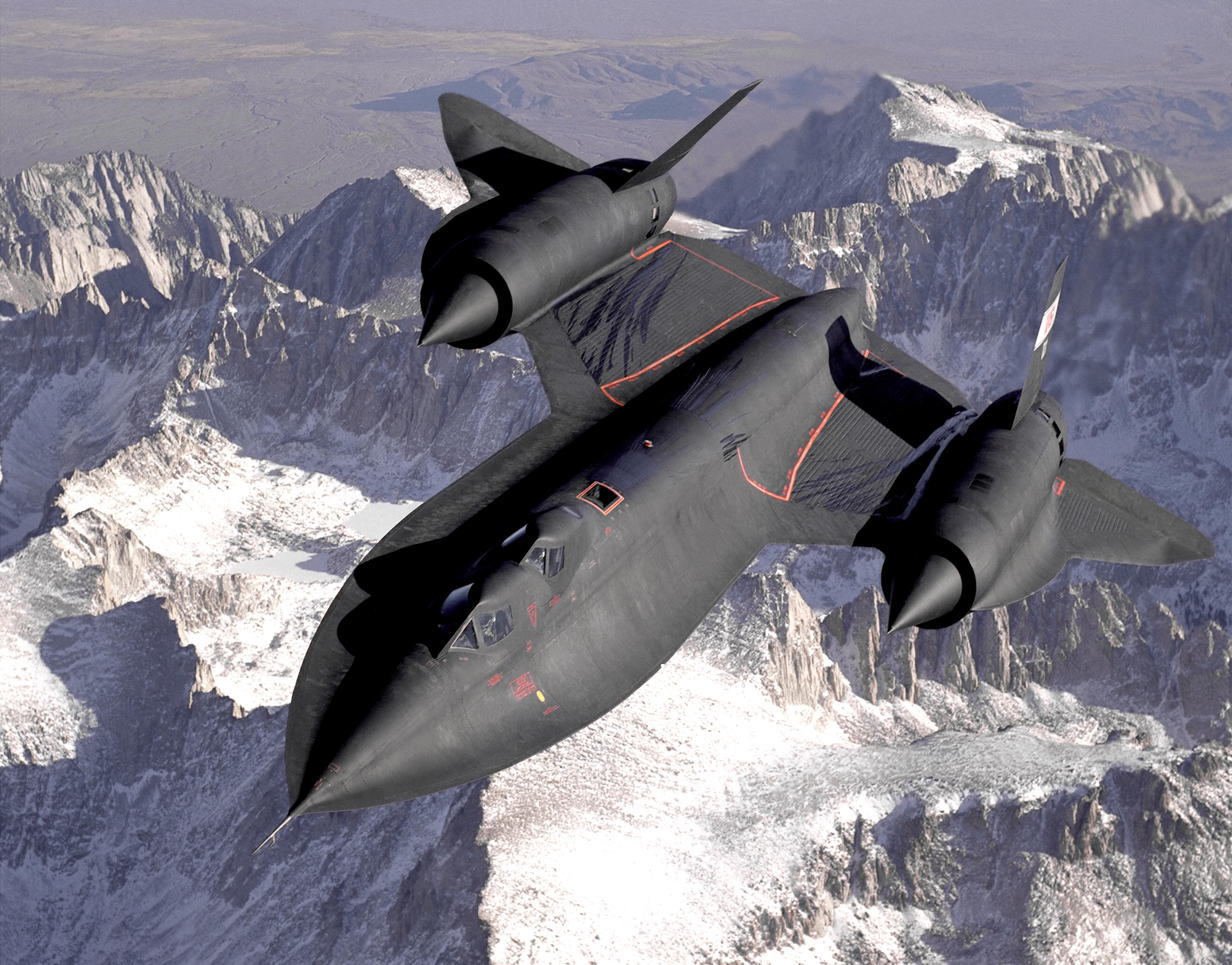
The USAF's SR-71 Blackbird was developed from the CIA's A-12 OXCART.

Concern regarding the Soviet Union and the difficulty of getting information from its closed society, which few agents could penetrate, led to solutions based on advanced technology. Among the first successes was the Lockheed U-2 aircraft, which could take pictures and collect electronic signals from an altitude thought to be above Soviet air defenses' reach. The CIA, working with the military, formed the joint National Reconnaissance Office (NRO) to operate reconnaissance aircraft such as the SR-71 and later satellites. "The fact of" the United States operating reconnaissance satellites, like "the fact of" the existence of NRO, was highly classified for many years.

The CIA was credited with assisting in anti-Communist efforts in Burma, Guatemala, and Laos. There have been suggestions that the Soviet attempt to put missiles into Cuba came, indirectly, when they realized how badly they had been compromised by a U.S.-UK defector in place, Oleg Penkovsky. One of the biggest operations ever undertaken by the CIA was directed at Zaïre in support of Mobutu Sese Seko.

== Indochina, Tibet and the Vietnam War (1954–1975) ==
The OSS Patti mission arrived in Vietnam near the end of World War II and had significant interaction with the leaders of many Vietnamese factions, including Ho Chi Minh. While the Patti mission forwarded Ho's proposals for phased independence, with the French or even the United States as the transition partner, the US policy of containment opposed forming any government that was communist in nature.

The first CIA mission to Indochina, under the code name "Saigon Military Mission", arrived in 1954 under Edward Lansdale. U.S.-based analysts were simultaneously trying to project the evolution of political power, both if the scheduled referendum chose the merger of the North and South, or if the South, the U.S. client, stayed independent. Initially, the US focus in Southeast Asia was on Laos, not Vietnam.

The CIA Tibetan program consists of political plots and propaganda distribution, as well as paramilitary and intelligence gathering based on U.S. commitments made to the Dalai Lama in 1951 and 1956.

During the period of U.S. combat involvement in the Vietnam War, there was considerable argument about progress among the Department of Defense under Robert McNamara, the CIA, and, to some extent, the intelligence staff of Military Assistance Command Vietnam. In general, the military was consistently more optimistic than the CIA. Sam Adams, a junior CIA analyst with responsibilities for estimating the actual damage to the enemy, eventually resigned from the CIA after expressing concern to Director of Central Intelligence Richard Helms with estimates that were changed for inter-agency and White House political reasons. Adams afterward wrote the book War of Numbers.

Sometime between 1959 and 1961, the CIA started Project Tiger, a program of dropping South Vietnamese agents into North Vietnam to gather intelligence. These were a tragic failure; the Deputy Chief for Project Tiger, Captain Do Van Tien, admitted that he was an agent for Hanoi.

President Ngo Dinh Diem's Government, however, continued its unofficial policy of violently repressing the Buddhist majority. On August 23, 1963, after being approached by a South Vietnamese General, John F. Kennedy ordered the newly appointed 5th U.S. Ambassador to South Vietnam to make detailed plans for Diem's replacement. The CIA's 4th DI John McCone compared Diem to a bad pitcher, saying that it would be unwise to get rid of him unless you could replace him with a better one. Kennedy's Cabinet was dubious about the coup, and JFK would come to regret it.

U.S. Ambassador Henry Cabot Lodge Jr., a long time political opponent of JFK, was envious that the CIA station had more money, power, and people than his own staff. The CIA Chief of Station Vietnam, John H. Richardson Sr, for his part, sharing his director's skepticism, was still opposed to a coup. Thus developed the 'Lodge-Richardson Feud'. That feud came to a climax when Lodge revealed the name of his rival, John H. Richardson (CIA), to a reporter, Richard Starnes, branding him – and also 'outing' him – as an agent of the CIA; after the 'outed' Richardson was recalled to Langley, Virginia, Lodge completed the feud by later moving into Richardson's Saigon house, which was larger than the one Lodge had been in.

The coup occurred on 1 November 1963.

=== Johnson ===
The assassination of Diem sparked a cascade of coups in Saigon, and at the same time, the city was wracked with assassinations. Lyndon B. Johnson, the new President, wanted to refocus the CIA on intelligence, rather than covert action. While the Kennedys were seen as relentless in their hounding of the CIA to produce results, Johnson soon gave them only the most minimal attention.

In the face of the failure of Project Tiger, the Pentagon wanted CIA paramilitary forces to participate in their Op Plan 64A. This resulted in the CIA's foreign paramilitaries being put under the command of the DOD, a move seen as a slippery slope inside the CIA: a slide from covert action towards militarization. After touring Vietnam in 1964, DI McCone and Secretary of Defense McNamara had different views of the U.S. position. McCone believed that as long as the Ho Chi Minh trail was active the U.S. would struggle.

DI McCone had statutory control over all intelligence committees, but in reality, the military had near total control of the DIA, the NRO, the NSA, and many other aspects. Importantly, President Johnson almost completely ignored the CIA. In effect, the military controlled the two-thirds of the CIA budget laid out for covert action. McCone, the unspoken hero of the Cuban Missile Crisis, submitted his resignation in the summer, but Johnson would not accept it until after the election.

On August 4, Secretary of Defense McNamara gave President Johnson the raw translation of intercepted Korean transmissions directly from the NSA which, ostensibly, reported to DI McCone, rather than to McNamara. It was later determined that the transmission took place before the weapon discharges that night, which leads to the conclusion that the transmission refers to the events of the attack the day before, and that, although destroyers USS Maddox and USS Turner Joy fired hundreds of shells at intermittent radar contacts, they were firing at false returns.

A CIA analyst's assessment of Vietnam was that the U.S. was "becoming progressively divorced from reality... [and] proceeding with far more courage than wisdom". The CIA had created an exhaustive report, "The Vietnamese Communist's Will to Persist". This created a key flash point in the US government: PAVN troop levels. Was it 500k or more as the CIA believed, or 300k or less as the commanders of US forces in Vietnam believed? The argument went on for months, but Helms finally OK'd a report saying that PAVN troop levels were 299,000 or less. The DOD argument was that whatever the facts on the ground, to publicly admit any higher number could be the last nail in the coffin of the war for Vietnam in the press.

== Nixon ==
In 1971, the NSA and CIA were engaged in domestic spying. The Department of Defense was eavesdropping on Henry Kissinger. The White House and Camp David were wired for sound. Nixon and Kissinger were eavesdropping on their aides and on reporters. Nixon's "plumbers" included former CIA officials Howard Hunt and Jim McCord. On July 7, 1971, John Ehrlichman, Nixon's domestic policy chief, told DCI Cushman, Nixon's hatchet-man in the CIA, to let Cushman "know that [Hunt] was in fact doing some things for the President... you should consider he has pretty much carte blanche". Importantly, this included a camera, disguises, a voice-altering device, and ID papers furnished by the CIA, as well as the CIA's participation in developing film from the burglary Hunt staged on the office of Pentagon Papers leaker Daniel Ellsberg's psychologist.

On June 17, Nixon's Plumbers were caught burglarizing the Democratic National Committee offices in the Watergate. On June 23, DI Helms was ordered by the White House to wave the FBI off using national security as a pretext. The new DCI, Walters, another Nixon hack, told the acting director of the FBI to drop the investigation as ordered. On June 26, Nixon's counsel John Dean ordered DCI Walters to pay the plumbers untraceable hush money. The CIA was the only part of the government that had the power to make off the book payments, but it could only be done on the orders of the CI, or, if he was out of the country, the DCI.

The Acting Director of the FBI started breaking ranks. He demanded the CIA produce a signed document attesting to the national security threat of the investigation. Jim McCord's lawyer contacted the CIA, informing them that McCord had been offered a Presidential pardon if he fingered the CIA by testifying that the break-in had been an operation of the CIA. Nixon had long been frustrated by what he saw as a liberal infection inside the CIA and had been trying for years to tear the CIA out by its roots. McCord wrote "If [DI] Helms goes (takes the fall) and the Watergate operation is laid at the CIA's feet, where it does not belong, every tree in the forest will fall. It will be a scorched desert."

On November 13, after Nixon's landslide re-election, Nixon told Kissinger "[I intend] to ruin the Foreign Service. I mean ruin it – the old Foreign Service – and to build a new one." He had similar designs for the CIA and intended to replace Helms with James Schlesinger. Nixon had told Helms that he was on the way out and promised that Helms could stay on until his 60th birthday, the mandatory retirement age. On February 2, Nixon broke that promise, carrying through with his intention to "remove the deadwood" from the CIA. "Get rid of the clowns" was his order to the incoming DI. Before Helms left office, he destroyed every tape he had secretly made of meetings in his office and many of the papers on Project MKUltra.

Kissinger had been running the CIA since the beginning of Nixon's presidency, but Nixon impressed on Schlesinger that he must appear to congress to be in charge, averting their suspicion of Kissinger's involvement. Nixon also hoped that Schlesinger could push through broader changes in the intelligence community that he had been working towards for years: the creation of a Director of National Intelligence and spinning off the covert action part of the CIA into a separate organ. In Schlesinger's 17-week tenure, he fired more than 1,500 employees. As Watergate threw the spotlight on the CIA, Schlesinger, who had been kept in the dark about the CIA's involvement, decided he needed to know what skeletons were in the closet. He issued a memo to every CIA employee directing them to disclose to him any CIA activity they knew of past or present that could fall outside the scope of the CIA's charter.

This became the Family Jewels. It included information linking the CIA to the assassination of foreign leaders, the illegal surveillance of some 7,000 U.S. citizens involved in the anti-Vietnam War movement (Operation CHAOS), and information that the CIA had also experimented on U.S. and Canadian citizens without their knowledge, secretly giving them LSD (among other things) and observing the results. In December 1974, a front-page article by Seymour Hersh in The New York Times revealed part of the Family Jewels, exposing the CIA for spying on Americans in the antiwar movement. This prompted Congress to create the Church Committee in the Senate and the Pike Committee in the House. President Gerald Ford created the Rockefeller Commission and issued an executive order prohibiting the assassination of foreign leaders. DCI Colby leaked the papers to the press, later stating that he believed that providing Congress with this information was the correct thing to do and in the CIA's own interests.

== Congressional investigations ==
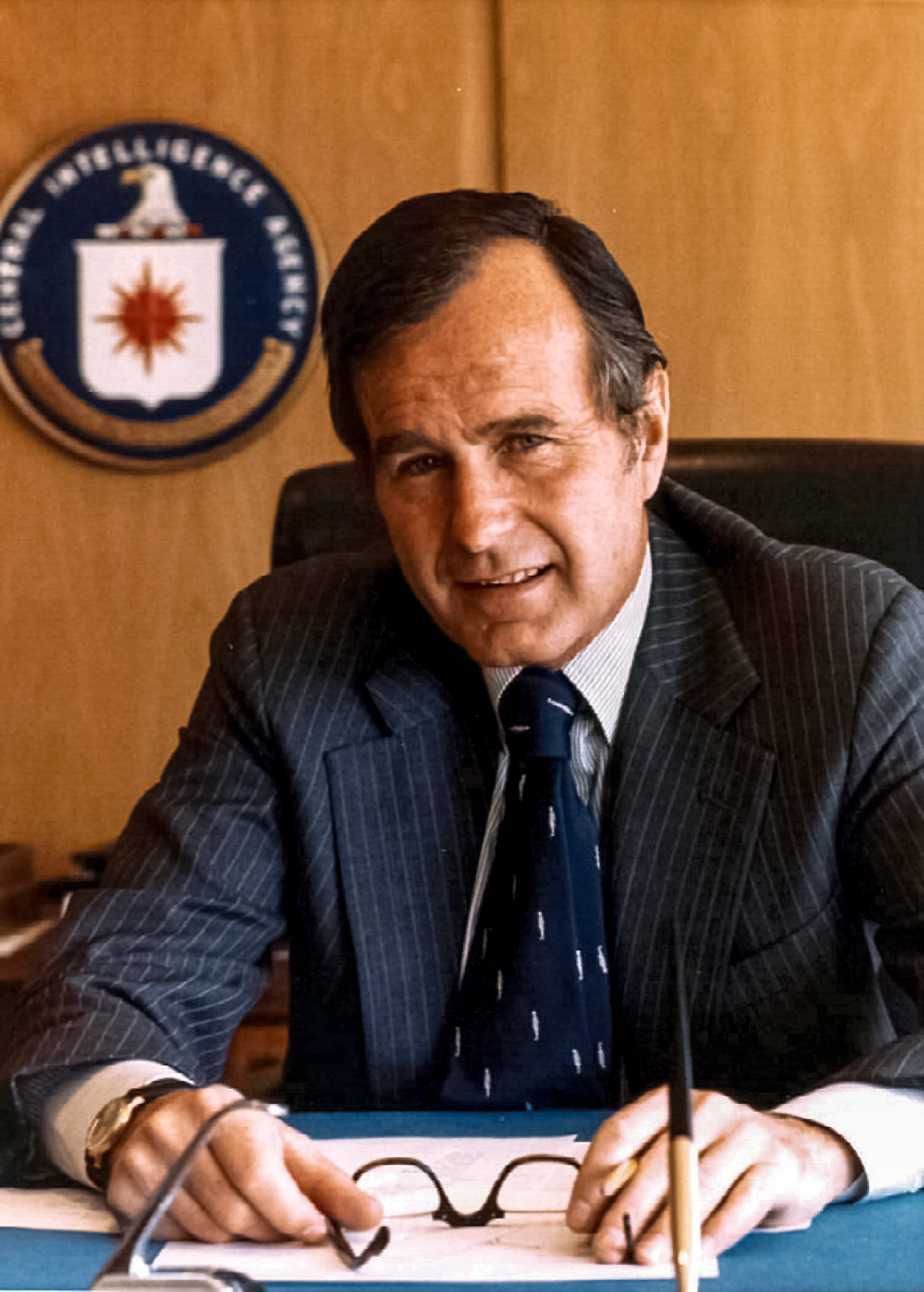
George HW Bush

Acting Attorney General Laurence Silberman learned of the existence of the family jewels and then issued a subpoena for them. This prompted eight congressional investigations on the domestic spying activities of the CIA. Bill Colby's short tenure as DCI ended with the Halloween Massacre. His replacement was George H. W. Bush. At the time, the Department of Defense (DOD) had control of 80% of the intelligence budget. With Donald Rumsfeld as Secretary of Defense, communication and coordination between the CIA and the DOD suffered greatly. The CIA's budget for hiring clandestine officers had been squeezed out by the paramilitary operations in south-east Asia, and hiring was further strained by the government's poor popularity. This left the agency bloated with middle management and anemic in younger officers. Yet again, with employee training taking five years, the agency's only hope would be on the trickle of new officers coming to fruition years in the future. The CIA faced another setback as communists took Angola.

William J. Casey, a member of Ford's Intelligence Advisory Board, pressed Bush to allow a team from outside the CIA to produce Soviet military estimates as a "Team B". Bush gave the OK. The "B" team was composed of hawks. Their estimates were the highest that could be at all justified, and they painted a picture of a growing Soviet military when the reality was that the Soviet military was shrinking. Many of their reports found their way to the Press. As a result of the investigations, Congressional oversight of the CIA evolved into a select intelligence committee in the House while the Senate supervised covert actions authorized by the President.

== Chad ==
Chad's neighbor, Libya, was a major source of weaponry to communist rebel forces. The CIA seized the opportunity to arm and finance Chad's Prime Minister, Hissène Habré, after he created a breakaway government in Western Sudan, even giving him Stinger missiles.

== Afghanistan ==
In Afghanistan, the CIA funneled a billion dollars' worth of weapons to Pakistani intelligence, which funneled them through Pakistani tribes, which funneled them to Afghan resistance groups, notably the Mujahideen. At each step, some of the weapons were held back.

== Iran-Contra ==
Under President Jimmy Carter, the CIA was covertly funding pro-American opposition against the Sandinista National Liberation Front. In March 1981, Reagan told Congress that the CIA would protect El Salvador by preventing the shipment of Nicaraguan arms into the country to arm Communist rebels. This was a ruse. The CIA was actually arming and training Nicaraguans Contras in Honduras in hopes that they could depose the Sandinistas in Nicaragua. Through William J. Casey's tenure as DI, little of what he said in the National Security Planning Group or to President Reagan was supported by the intelligence branch of the CIA, so Casey formed the Central American Task Force, staffed with yes-men from Covert Action. On December 21, 1982, Congress passed a law restricting the CIA to its stated mission. This restricted the flow of arms from Nicaragua to El Salvador and prohibited the use of funds to oust the Sandinistas. Reagan testified before Congress, assuring them that the CIA was not trying to topple the Nicaraguan government.

During this time, with funding increases, the CIA hired 2,000 new employees, but these new recruits lacked the experience of the World War II vets they replaced, living in the theaters where the war was fought: Europe, Africa, the Middle East, and Asia.

=== Hostage-taking ===
For more than a decade, hostage-taking had plagued the Middle East. The CIA's best source of information there was Hassan Salameh, the Palestine Liberation Organization's (PLO) Chief of Intelligence, until Israel assassinated him. Through Salameh, the CIA gained a foothold in the world of Muslim extremism and had entered a bargain where Americans would be safe, and the PLO and CIA would share information on mutual enemies.

==== Lebanon ====
The CIA's prime source in Lebanon was Bashir Gemayel, a member of the Christian Maronite sect. The CIA was blinded by the uprising against the Maronite minority. Israel invaded Lebanon and, along with the CIA, propped up Gemayel; this got Gemayel's assurance that Americans would be protected in Lebanon. Thirteen days later, he was assassinated. Imad Mughniyah, a Hezbollah assassin, targeted Americans in retaliation for the Israeli invasion and the Sabra and Shatila massacre, and targeted the US Marines of the Multi-National Force for their role in opposing the PLO in Lebanon. On April 18, 1983, a 2,000 lb car bomb exploded in the lobby of the American embassy in Beirut, killing 63 people, including 17 Americans and 7 CIA officers, among whom was Bob Ames, one of the CIA's best Middle East experts. America's fortunes in Lebanon only suffered more as America's poorly directed retaliation for the bombing was interpreted by many as support for the Christian Maronite minority. On October 23, 1983, two bombs were detonated in Beirut, including a 10-ton bomb at a US military barracks that killed 242 people. Both attacks are believed to have been planned by Iran by way of Mughniyah.

The Embassy bombing had taken the life of the CIA's Beirut Station Chief, Ken Haas. Bill Buckley was sent in to replace him. Eighteen days after the U.S. Marines left Lebanon, Bill Buckley was kidnapped. On March 7, 1984, Jeremy Levin, CNN Bureau Chief in Beirut, was abducted by the Islamic Jihad in Beirut. He escaped on February 14, 1985. 12 more Americans were kidnapped in Beirut during the Reagan administration. Manucher Ghorbanifar, a former SAVAC agent and double agent for Israel, was an information seller and the subject of a rare CIA burn notice for his track record of misinformation. He had reached out to the agency offering a back channel to Iran, suggesting a trade of missiles that would be lucrative to the intermediaries.

==== Nicaragua ====
With the CIA's paramilitary forces overextended in Central America, they turned to former Special Forces soldiers, one of whom had an old comic book that had, in Vietnam, been used to teach natives how to take control of a village by assassinating the mayor, chief of police, and militia. The CIA translated this into Spanish and distributed it to the Contras. This shortly became public. The CIA also mined the port of Corinto, an act of war that resulted in a public trial in the International Court of Justice. These two public incidents led Congress to clamp down on CIA funding even more, banning them from soliciting funds from third parties to fund the Contras.

==== Hostage trades ====
At Reagan's second inaugural, the two most pressing issues for the CIA were the Contras and the hostages. On June 14, 1985, Hezbollah took TWA Flight 847 and executed an American Navy diver on the tarmac of Beirut Airport. Reagan negotiated a trade of prisoners for hostages. This paved the way for a trade of 504 TOW missiles to Iran for $10,000 each and the release of Benjamin Weir, a captive of Islamic Jihad, the group that claimed responsibility for the Beirut bombings, which later became Hezbollah. This broke two of the public pillars of Reagan's foreign policy: no deals with terrorists and no arms to Iran.

Ghorbanifar sent word that the six remaining hostages would be released in exchange for thousands of Hawk missiles. A Boeing 707 with 18 Hawk missiles landed at Tehran from Tel Aviv with Hebrew markings on the crates. The CIA realized on that day, October 25, that they needed a signed presidential order to authorize the shipment. A month later, Reagan would sign an order retroactively authorizing it. $850,000 of the transaction went to Contras. In July 1986, Hezbollah was holding four American hostages, trading them for arms. Six months later, they had 12 American hostages. On October 5, 1986, an American C-123 full of weapons was shot down by a Nicaraguan soldier. The sole survivor was an American cargo handler who said that he was working for the CIA. On November 3, anonymous leaflets were scattered in Tehran, revealing the Iran connection. The Iran Contra Affair broke. Oliver North and John Poindexter had been shredding documents for weeks, but a memo about suspicions that Richard Secord was taking more than his agreed cut surfaced. DI Bill Casey had a seizure and was hospitalized, to be replaced by Judge Webster, who was clearly brought in to clean house.

== Operation Desert Storm ==
During the Iran-Iraq war, the CIA had backed both sides. The CIA had maintained a network of spies in Iran, but in 1989, a CIA mistake compromised every agent they had there, and the CIA had no agents in Iraq. In the weeks before the Invasion of Kuwait, the CIA downplayed the military build-up. During the war, CIA estimates of Iraqi abilities and intentions flip-flopped and were rarely accurate. In one particular case, the DOD had asked the CIA to identify military targets to bomb. One target the CIA identified was an underground shelter. The CIA didn't know that it was a civilian bomb shelter. In a rare instance, the CIA correctly determined that the coalition forces efforts were coming up short in their efforts to destroy SCUD missiles.

Congress took away the CIA's role in interpreting spy-satellite photos, putting the CIA's satellite intelligence operations under the auspices of the military. The CIA created its office of military affairs, which operated as "second-echelon support for the pentagon... answering... questions from military men [like] 'how wide is this road?'" At the end of the war, the CIA reported that there could be an uprising against Saddam, based on intelligence gained from exiles. Former DI and current President Bush called on the Shiites and Kurds to rise up against Saddam, while, at the same time, withdrawing any support against Saddam. Saddam crushed the uprisings brutally. After the war, Saddam's nuclear program was discovered. The CIA had had no information about it.

== Fall of the USSR ==
Gorbachev's announcement of the unilateral reduction of 500,000 Soviet troops took the CIA by surprise. Doug MacEachin, the CIA's Chief of Soviet analysis, said that even if the CIA had told the President, the NSC, and Congress about the cuts beforehand, it would have been ignored. "We never would have been able to publish it." All the CIA numbers on the USSR's economy were wrong. Too often, the CIA relied on people inexperienced with that which they were supposed to be the expert. Bob Gates had preceded Doug MacEachin as Chief of Soviet analysis, and he had never visited Russia. Few officers, even those stationed in-country, spoke the language of the people they were spying on. And the CIA had no capacity to send agents to respond to developing situations. The CIA analysis of Russia during the entire cold war was either driven by ideology or by politics. William J Crowe, the Chairman of the Joint Chiefs of Staff, noted that the CIA "talked about the Soviet Union as if they weren't reading the newspapers, much less developed clandestine intelligence." The CIA was even caught unprepared when the Berlin Wall fell. Once again, CNN had scooped the CIA.

One of the first acts of Bob Gates, the new DI, was National Security Review 29, a memo to each member of the Cabinet asking them what they wanted from the CIA. Starting in 1991, the CIA faced six years of budget cuts. The CIA closed 20 stations and cut its staff in some major capitals by 60%. The CIA could still not shake the perennial analysis: that it was five years away from being able to perform its basic duties satisfactorily.

== President Clinton ==
On January 25, 1993, there was a shooting at the headquarters of the CIA in Langley, Virginia. Mir Qazi killed two agents and wounded three others. On February 26, Omar Abdel Rahman bombed the parking garage of the World Trade Center in New York City, killing six people and wounding a thousand. Of Rahman, the "Blind Sheik's seven applications to enter the United States, the CIA had given the OK six times.

In Bosnia, the CIA ignored signs within and without of the Srebrenica massacre. Two weeks after news reports of the slaughter, the CIA sent a U-2 to photograph it, and a week later, the CIA completed its report on the matter. During Operation Allied Force, the CIA had incorrectly provided the coordinates of the Chinese Embassy as a military target, resulting in its bombing.

In France, where the CIA had orders for economic intelligence, a female CIA agent revealed her intelligence connections to the French. As a result of this disclosure, Dick Holm, Paris Station Chief, was expelled. In Guatemala, the CIA produced the Murphy Memo based on audio recordings made by bugs planted by Guatemalan intelligence in the bedroom of Ambassador Marilyn McAfee. In the recording, Ambassador McAfee verbally entreated "Murphy". The CIA circulated a memo in the highest Washington circles accusing Ambassador McAfee of having an extramarital lesbian affair with her secretary, Carol Murphy. There was no affair; Ambassador McAfee was calling to Murphy, her poodle. The CIA was still bucking the reigns of Congress, presidents, and DCIs that had ordered that ties of the CIA to harsh regimes that had stood for decades be broken. In Iraq, the CIA attempted to form a coup under Clinton's orders. The plot was compromised, Saddam arrested over 200 of his own officers, executing over 80. Again this was a case where the NSC wanted CI to give them answers they didn't have, and to make decisions for the NSC that neither the NSC, nor CI, could make. Clinton wanted a coup in Iraq, and wanted him to be replaced by someone aligned with the US, but if that US friendly officer existed, neither the CIA nor NSC knew him.

Harold James Nicholson burned several serving officers and three years of trainees before he was caught spying for Russia. In 1997 the House wrote another report, which said that CIA officers know little about the language or politics of the people they spy on. The conclusion was that the CIA lacked the "depth, breadth, and expertise to monitor political, military, and economic developments worldwide." There was a new voice in the CIA to counterpoint the endless chant that the CIA was five years away from success. Russ Travers said in the CIA in-house journal that in five years "intelligence failure is inevitable". In 1997, the CIA's new director George Tenet promised a new working agency by 2002. The CIA's surprise at India's detonation of an atom bomb was a failure at almost every level. After the 1998 embassy bombings by Al Qaeda, the CIA offered two targets to be hit in retaliation. One of them was a chemical plant where traces of chemical weapon precursors had been detected. In the aftermath, it was concluded that "the decision to target al Shifa continues a tradition of operating on inadequate intelligence about Sudan." It triggered the CIA to make "substantial and sweeping changes" to prevent "a catastrophic systemic intelligence failure." Between 1991 and 1998, the CIA had lost 3,000 employees.

=== Somalia ===
Half a million people had starved in Somalia when President George H. W. Bush ordered U.S. troops to enter the country on a humanitarian mission in Operation Restore Hope. As clans started fighting over the aid, the humanitarian mission quickly became a struggle against Mohamed Farah Aideed. The CIA station in Somalia had been shuttered for two years. The CIA was given an impossible mission in Somalia, as was the military. Casualties came quickly and were high in the eight man team the CIA sent. A postmortem carried out by now FISA member Admiral Crowe stated that the National Security Council had expected the CIA to both make decisions and give them the intelligence to base those decisions on. The NSC couldn't understand why intelligence didn't advise them correctly on what to do. Bill Clinton entered the ranks of presidents unhappy with the results of the CIA; Clinton's inattention to the CIA did not help the matter.

=== Aldrich Ames ===
Between 1985 and 1986 the CIA lost every spy it had in Eastern Europe. The details of the investigation into the cause was obscured from the new Director, and the investigation had little success and has been widely criticized. In June 1987, Major Florentino Aspillaga Lombard, the chief of Cuban Intelligence in Czechoslovakia, drove into Vienna and walked into the American Embassy to defect. He revealed that every single Cuban spy on the CIA payroll was a double agent, pretending to work for the CIA but secretly still being loyal to Castro.

On February 21, 1994, FBI agents pulled Aldrich Ames out of his Jaguar. If there was a "poster boy" for failing upwards inside the CIA, it was Ames. In the investigation that ensued, the CIA discovered that many of the sources for its most important analyses of the USSR were based on Soviet disinformation fed to the CIA by controlled agents. On top of that, it was discovered that, in some cases, the CIA suspected at the time that the sources were compromised, but the information was sent up the chain as genuine. This prompted a congressional committee in 1994 to address what was widely seen as a fundamentally broken institution. The committee quickly became a quagmire. When the committee submitted its toothless report, the CIA had 25 recruits entering its two-year training program, the smallest class of recruits ever. As it had for most of its existence, the CIA suffered from poor management, poor morale, and a lack of employees familiar with the people they were spying on.

== Yugoslavia ==
=== Kosovo ===
The United States (and NATO) directly supported the Kosovo Liberation Army (KLA). The CIA funded, trained, and supplied the KLA (as they had earlier the Bosnian Army). As disclosed to The Sunday Times by CIA sources, "American intelligence agents have admitted they helped to train the Kosovo Liberation Army before NATO's bombing of Yugoslavia". In 1999, a retired Colonel told that KLA forces had been trained in Albania by former US military working for MPRI. James Bissett, Canadian Ambassador to Yugoslavia, Bulgaria and Albania, wrote in 2001 that media reports indicate that "as early as 1998, the Central Intelligence Agency assisted by the British Special Air Service were arming and training Kosovo Liberation Army members in Albania to foment armed rebellion in Kosovo. The hope was that with Kosovo in flames NATO could intervene".

The KLA was largely funded through narcotics trafficking. When the US State Department at first listed the KLA as a terrorist organization in 1998 (later revoked), it noted its links to the heroin trade, and a briefing paper for the US Congress stated: "We would be remiss to dismiss allegations that between 30 and 50 percent of the KLA's money comes from drugs." By 1999, Western intelligence agencies estimated that over $250m of narcotics money had found its way into KLA coffers. After the NATO bombing of 1999, KLA-linked heroin traffickers again began using Kosovo as a major supply route; in 2000, an estimated 80% of Europe's heroin supply was controlled by Kosovar Albanians.

Alex Roslin of the Montreal Gazette summarized evidence indicating CIA complicity to KLA's funding from heroin trade. Former DEA agent Michael Levine said "…They (the CIA) protected them (the KLA) in every way they could. As long as the CIA is protecting the KLA, you've got major drug pipelines protected from any police investigation".

== Osama Bin Laden ==
Agency files show that it is believed Osama bin Laden was funding the Afghan rebels against the USSR in the '80s. Allegations of CIA assistance to Osama bin Laden in the early 80s have been presented by some sources and politicians, including UK foreign secretary Robin Cook. Prince Bandar bin Sultan of Saudi Arabia has also stated that bin Laden once expressed appreciation for the United States' help in Afghanistan. However, U.S. government officials and a number of other parties maintain that the U.S. supported only the indigenous Afghan mujaheddin.

In 1990, Bin Laden returned to his native Saudi Arabia, protesting the presence of troops and Operation Desert Storm. In 1991, he was expelled from the country and fled to Sudan. In 1996 the CIA created a team to hunt Bin Laden. They were trading information with the Sudanese until, on the word of a source that was later found to be a fabricator, the CIA closed its Sudan station later that year. In 1998 Bin Laden declared war on America and, on August 7, struck in Tanzania and Nairobi. On October 12, 2000, Al Qaeda bombed the USS Cole. In 1947 when the CIA was founded, there were 200 agents in the Clandestine Service. In 2001, of the 17,000 employees in the CIA, there were 1,000 in the Clandestine Service. Of that 1,000, few accepted hardship postings.

In the first days of George W. Bush's presidency, Al Qaeda threats were ubiquitous in daily Presidential CIA briefings, but this may have numbed the administration to the real credibility of such dangers. The agency's predictions were dire but appeared to carry little weight, and the attentions of the President and his defense staff were elsewhere. The CIA arranged the arrests of suspected Al Qaeda members through cooperation with foreign agencies, but the CIA could not definitively say what effect these arrests had, and it could not gain hard intelligence from those captured. The President had asked the CIA if Al Qaeda could plan attacks in the US. On August 6, Bush received a daily briefing with the headline, not based on current, solid intelligence, "Al Qaeda determined to strike inside the U.S." The U.S. had been hunting Bin Laden since 1996 and had had several opportunities, but neither Clinton nor Bush had wanted to risk taking an active role in a murky assassination plot. That day, Richard A. Clarke sent National Security Advisor Condoleezza Rice warning of the risks and decried the inaction of the CIA.

=== Al-Qaeda and the "Global War on Terrorism" ===
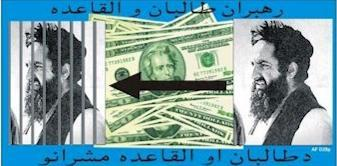
The CIA prepared a series of leaflets announcing bounties for those who turned in or denounced individual suspected of association with the Taliban or al Qaeda.

The CIA had long been dealing with terrorism originating from abroad and in 1986 had set up a Counterterrorist Center to deal specifically with the problem. At first confronted with secular terrorism, the Agency found Islamist terrorism looming increasingly large on its scope.

In January 1996, the CIA created an experimental "virtual station," the Bin Laden Issue Station, under the Counterterrorist Center to track Bin Laden's developing activities. Al-Fadl, who defected to the CIA in spring 1996, began to provide the Station with a new image of the Al Qaeda leader: he was not only a terrorist financier, but a terrorist organizer, too. FBI Special Agent Dan Coleman (who together with his partner Jack Cloonan had been "seconded" to the Bin Laden Station) called him Qaeda's "Rosetta Stone".

In 1999, CIA chief George Tenet launched a grand "Plan" to deal with Al-Qaeda. The Counterterrorist Center, its new chief Cofer Black, and the center's Bin Laden unit were the Plan's developers and executors. Once it was prepared, Tenet assigned CIA intelligence chief Charles E. Allen to set up a "Qaeda cell" to oversee its tactical execution. In 2000, the CIA and USAF jointly ran a series of flights over Afghanistan with a small remote-controlled reconnaissance drone, the Predator; they obtained probable photos of Bin Laden. Cofer Black and others became advocates of arming the Predator with missiles to try to assassinate Bin Laden and other Al-Qaeda leaders. After the Cabinet-level Principals Committee meeting on terrorism on September 4, 2001, the CIA resumed reconnaissance flights, the drones now being weapons-capable.

Post 9/11:

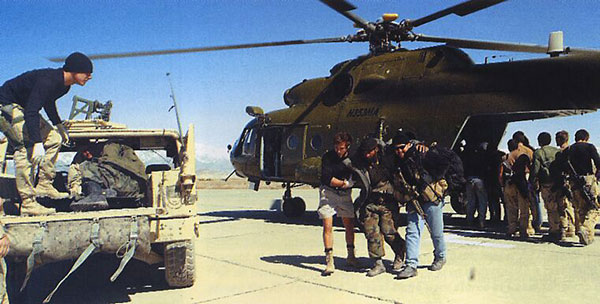
US Special Forces help Northern Alliance troops away from a CIA-operated MI-17 Hip helicopter at Bagram Airbase, 2002

Soon after 9/11, The New York Times released a story stating that the CIA's New York field office was destroyed in the wake of the attacks. According to unnamed CIA sources, while first responders were conducting rescue efforts, a special CIA team was searching the rubble for both digital and paper copies of classified documents. This was done according to well-rehearsed document recovery procedures put in place after the Iranian takeover of the United States Embassy in Tehran in 1979. While it was not confirmed whether the agency was able to retrieve the classified information, it is known that all agents present that day fled the building safely.

While the CIA insists that those who conducted the attacks on 9/11 were not aware that the agency was operating at 7 World Trade Center under the guise of another (unidentified) federal agency, this center was the headquarters for many notable criminal terrorism investigations. Though the New York field offices' main responsibilities were to monitor and recruit foreign officials stationed at the United Nations, the field office also handled the investigations of the August 1998 bombings of United States Embassies in East Africa and the October 2000 bombing of the USS Cole. Despite the fact that the CIA's New York branch may have been damaged by the 9/11 attacks and they had to loan office space from the US Mission to the United Nations and other federal agencies, there was an upside for the CIA. In the months immediately following 9/11, there was a huge increase in the number of applications for CIA positions. According to CIA representatives that spoke with the New York Times, pre-9/11 the agency received approximately 500 to 600 applications a week, and in the months following 9/11 the agency received that number daily.

The intelligence community as a whole, and especially the CIA, were involved in presidential planning immediately after the 9/11 attacks. In his address to the nation at 8:30 pm on September 11, 2001, George W. Bush mentioned the intelligence community: "The search is underway for those who are behind these evil acts, I've directed the full resource of our intelligence and law enforcement communities to find those responsible and bring them to justice."

The involvement of the CIA in the newly coined "War on Terror" was further increased on September 15, 2001. During a meeting at Camp David, George W. Bush agreed to adopt a plan proposed by CIA director George Tenet. This plan consisted of conducting a covert war in which CIA paramilitary officers would cooperate with anti-Taliban guerrillas inside Afghanistan. They would later be joined by small special operations forces teams which would call in precision airstrikes on Taliban and Al Qaeda fighters. This plan was codified on September 16, 2001 with Bush's signature of an official Memorandum of Notification that allowed the plan to proceed.

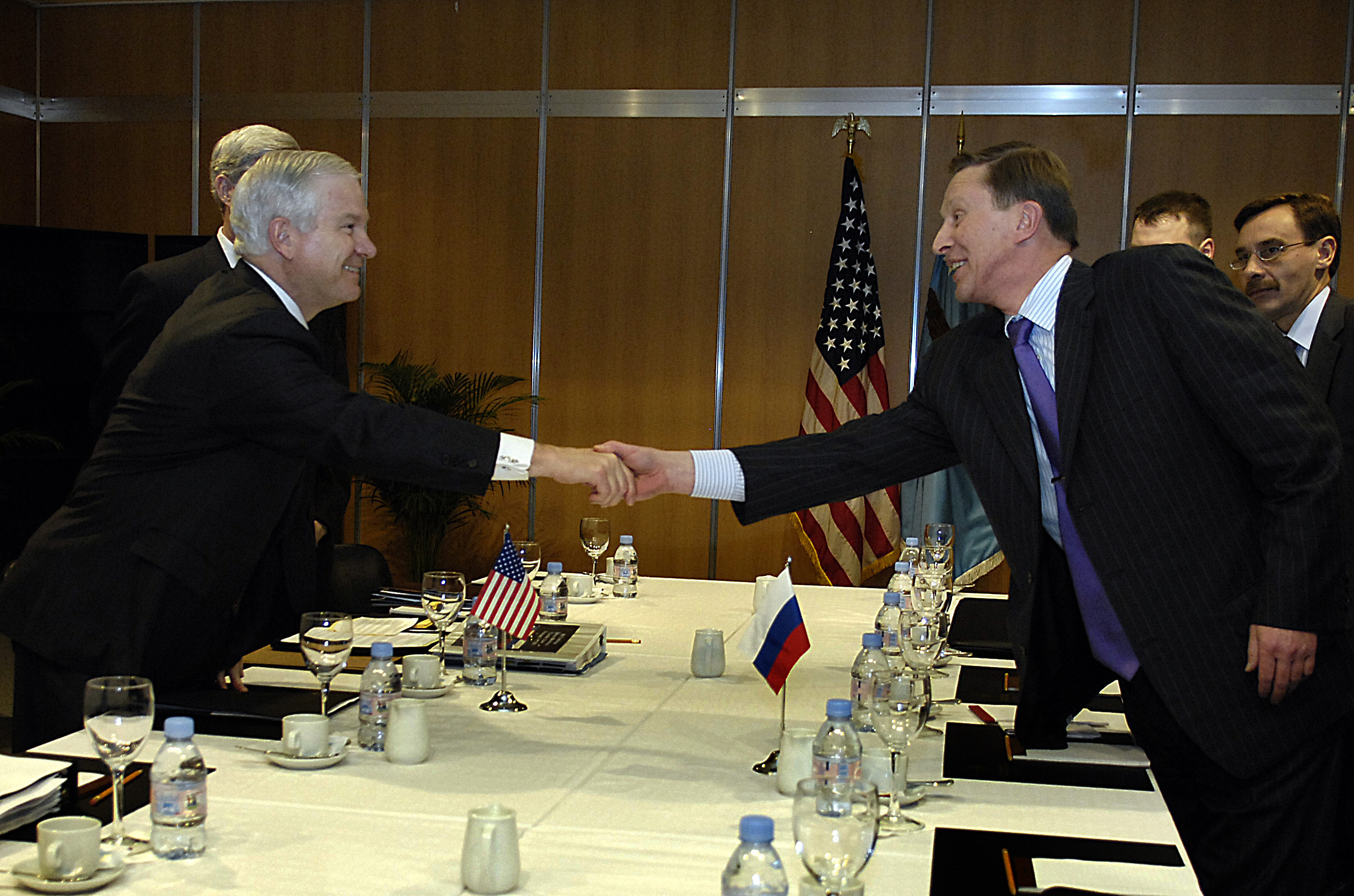
Former CIA director Robert Gates meets with Russian Minister of Defense and ex-KGB officer Sergei Ivanov, 2007

On November 25–27, 2001, Taliban prisoners revolted at the Qala Jangi prison west of Mazar-e-Sharif. Though several days of struggle occurred between the Taliban prisoners and the Northern Alliance members present, the prisoners did gain the upper hand and obtain North Alliance weapons. At some point during this period, Johnny "Mike" Spann, a CIA officer sent to question the prisoners, was beaten to death. He became the first American to die in combat in the war in Afghanistan.

After 9/11, the CIA came under criticism for not having done enough to prevent the attacks. Tenet rejected the criticism, citing the Agency's planning efforts especially over the preceding two years. He also considered that the CIA's efforts had put the Agency in a position to respond rapidly and effectively to the attacks, both in the "Afghan sanctuary" and in "ninety-two countries around the world". The new strategy was called the "Worldwide Attack Matrix".

Anwar al-Awlaki, a Yemeni-American U.S. citizen and Al-Qaeda member, was killed on September 30, 2011 by an air attack carried out by the Joint Special Operations Command. After several days of surveillance of Awlaki by the Central Intelligence Agency, armed drones took off from a new, secret American base in the Arabian Peninsula, crossed into northern Yemen, and fired a number of Hellfire missiles at al-Awlaki's vehicle. Samir Khan, a Pakistani-American Al-Qaeda member and editor of the jihadist Inspire magazine, also reportedly died in the attack. The combined CIA/JSOC drone strike was the first in Yemen since 2002 – there have been others by the military's Special Operations forces – and was part of an effort by the spy agency to duplicate in Yemen the covert war which has been running in Afghanistan and Pakistan.

=== Use of vaccination programs ===
The agency attracted widespread criticism after it used a doctor in Pakistan to set up a vaccination program in Abbottabad in 2011 in order to obtain DNA samples from the occupants of a compound where it was suspected bin Laden was living. Subsequently, in May 2014, a counterterrorism advisor to President Obama wrote to deans of 13 prominent public health schools, giving an undertaking that the CIA would not engage in vaccination programs or engage U.S. or non-U.S. health workers in immunization arrangements for espionage purposes.

== Failures in intelligence analysis ==
A major criticism is the failure to forestall the September 11 attacks. The 9/11 Commission Report identifies failures in the IC as a whole. One problem, for example, was the FBI failing to "connect the dots" by sharing information among its decentralized field offices.

The report concluded that former DCI George Tenet failed to adequately prepare the agency to deal with the danger posed by Al-Qaeda prior to the attacks of September 11, 2001. The report was finished in June 2005 and was partially released to the public in an agreement with Congress, over the objections of current DCI General Michael Hayden. Hayden said its publication would "consume time and attention revisiting ground that is already well plowed." Tenet disagreed with the report's conclusions, citing his planning efforts vis-à-vis al-Qaeda, particularly from 1999.

== Abuses of CIA authority, 1970s–1990s ==
Conditions worsened in the mid 1970s, around the time of Watergate. A dominant feature of political life during that period were the attempts of Congress to assert oversight of the U.S. presidency and the executive branch of the U.S. government. Revelations about past CIA activities, such as assassinations and attempted assassinations of foreign leaders (most notably Fidel Castro and Rafael Trujillo) and illegal domestic spying on U.S. citizens, provided the opportunities to increase Congressional oversight of U.S. intelligence operations.

Nixon Oval Office meeting with H.R. Haldeman "Smoking Gun" Conversation June 23, 1972 Full Transcript

Hastening the CIA's fall from grace were the burglary of the Watergate headquarters of the Democratic Party by former CIA officers and President Richard Nixon's subsequent attempt to use the CIA to impede the FBI's investigation of the burglary. In the famous "smoking gun" recording that led to President Nixon's resignation, Nixon ordered his chief of staff, H. R. Haldeman, to tell the CIA that further investigation of Watergate would "open the whole can of worms about the Bay of Pigs". In this way, Nixon and Haldeman ensured that the CIA's No. 1 and No. 2 ranking officials, Richard Helms and Vernon Walters, communicated to FBI Director L. Patrick Gray that the FBI should not follow the money trail from the burglars to the Committee to Re-elect the President, as it would uncover CIA informants in Mexico. The FBI initially agreed to this due to a long-standing agreement between the FBI and CIA not to uncover each other's sources of information, though within a couple of weeks, the FBI demanded this request in writing, and when no such formal request came, the FBI resumed its investigation into the money trail. Nonetheless, when the smoking gun tapes were made public, damage to the public's perception of CIA's top officials, and thus to the CIA as a whole, could not be avoided.

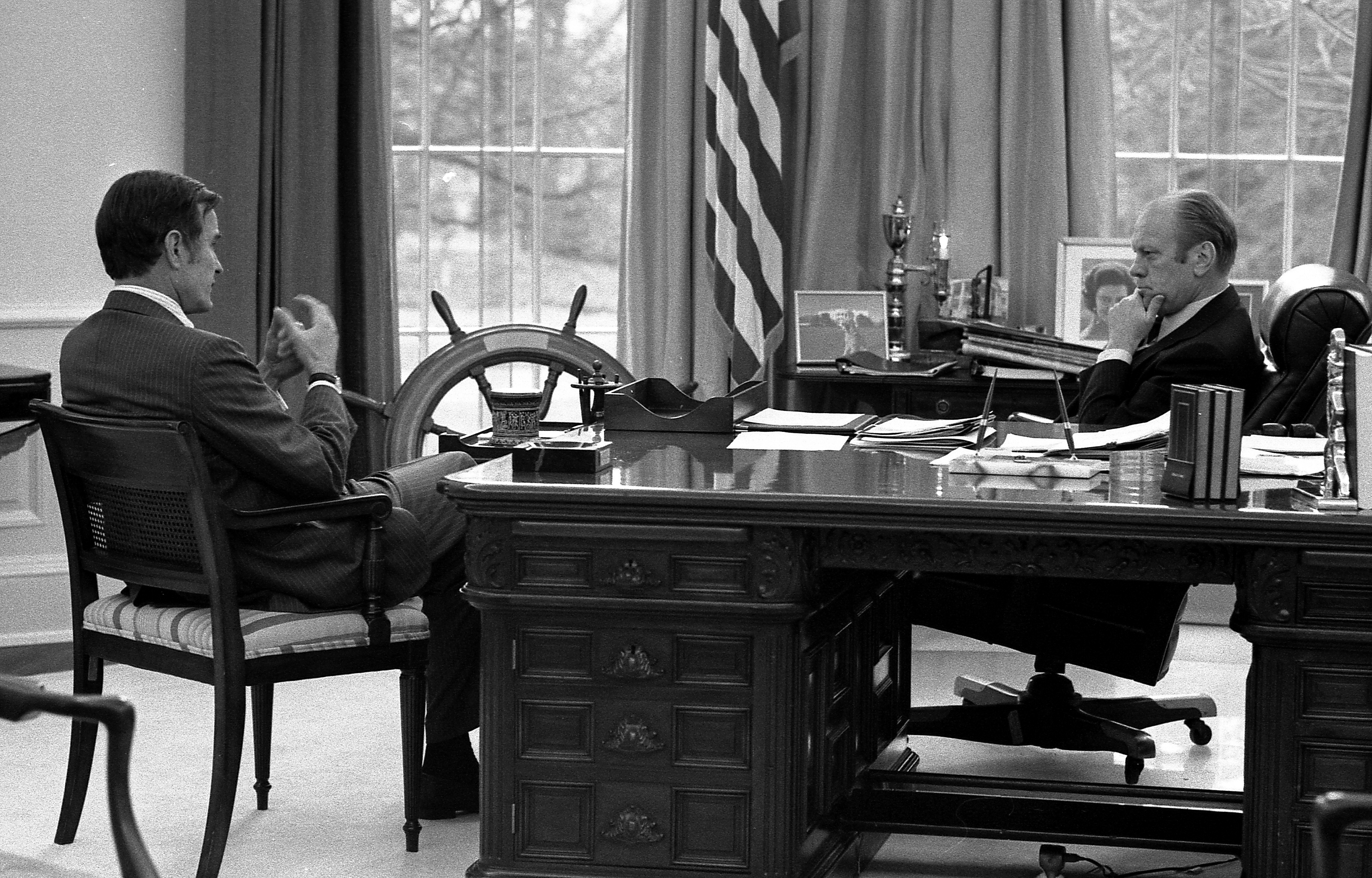
President Gerald Ford meets with CIA Director-designate George H. W. Bush, December 17, 1975

Repercussions from the Iran-Contra affair arms smuggling scandal included the creation of the Intelligence Authorization Act in 1991. It defined covert operations as secret missions in geopolitical areas where the U.S. is neither openly nor apparently engaged. This also required an authorizing chain of command, including an official, presidential finding report and the informing of the House and Senate Intelligence Committees, which, in emergencies, requires only "timely notification."

== 2004, DNI takes over CIA top-level functions ==
The Intelligence Reform and Terrorism Prevention Act of 2004 created the office of the Director of National Intelligence (DNI), who took over some of the government and intelligence community (IC)-wide functions that had previously been the CIA's. The DNI manages the United States Intelligence Community, and in doing so, it manages the intelligence cycle. Among the functions that moved to the DNI were the preparation of estimates reflecting the consolidated opinion of the 16 IC agencies and preparation of briefings for the president. On July 30, 2008, President Bush issued Executive Order 13470 amending Executive Order 12333 to strengthen the role of the DNI.

The Director of Central Intelligence (DCI) used to oversee the Intelligence Community, serving as the president's principal intelligence advisor and additionally serving as head of the CIA. The DCI's title now is "Director of the Central Intelligence Agency" (D/CIA), serving as head of the CIA.

The CIA now reports to the Director of National Intelligence. Prior to the establishment of the DNI, the CIA reported to the President, with informational briefings to congressional committees. The National Security Advisor is a permanent member of the National Security Council, responsible for briefing the President with pertinent information collected by all U.S. intelligence agencies, including the National Security Agency, the Drug Enforcement Administration, etc. All 16 Intelligence Community agencies are under the authority of the Director of National Intelligence.

== Iraq War ==
72 days after the 9/11 attacks, President Bush told his Secretary of Defense to update the U.S. plan for an invasion of Iraq, but not to tell anyone. Secretary Donald Rumsfeld asked Bush if he could bring DCI Tenet into the loop, to which Bush agreed.

Feelers the CIA had put out to Iraq in the form of 8 of their best officers in Kurdish territory in Northern Iraq hit a goldmine, unprecedented in the famously closed, almost fascist Hussein government. By December 2002 the CIA had close to a dozen good networks in Iraq and advanced so far that they penetrated Iraq's SSO, and even tapped the encrypted communications of the Deputy Prime Minister; even the bodyguard of Hussein's son became an agent. As time passed, the CIA became more and more frantic about the possibility of their networks being compromised, "rolled up". To the CIA, the Invasion had to occur before the end of February 2003 if their sources inside Hussein's government were to survive. The roll up would happen as predicted, 37 CIA sources recognized by their Thuraya satellite telephones provided for them by the CIA.

The case Colin Powell presented before the United Nations (purportedly proving an Iraqi WMD program) was wishful thinking. DDCI John E. McLaughlin was part of a long discussion in the CIA about equivocation. McLaughlin, who would make, among others, the "slam dunk" presentation to the President, "felt that they had to dare to be wrong to be clearer in their judgments". The Al Qaeda connection, for instance, was from a single source, extracted through torture, and was later denied. Curveball was a known liar and the sole source for the mobile chemical weapons factories. A post-mortem of the intelligence failures in the lead up to Iraq led by former DDCI Richard Kerr would conclude that the CIA had been a casualty of the cold war, wiped out in a way "analogous to the effect of the meteor strikes on the dinosaurs."

The opening days of the Invasion of Iraq would see successes and defeats for the CIA. With its Iraq networks compromised and its strategic and tactical information shallow and often wrong, the intelligence side of the invasion itself would be a black eye for the Agency. The CIA would see some success with its "Scorpion" paramilitary teams composed of CIA Special Activities Division agents, along with friendly Iraqi partisans. CIA SAD officers would also help the US 10th Special Forces. The occupation of Iraq would be a low point in the history of the CIA. At the largest CIA station in the world, agents would rotate through 1–3 month tours. In Iraq, almost 500 transient agents would be trapped inside the Green Zone, while Iraq Station Chiefs would rotate with only a little less frequency.

== Operation Neptune Spear ==
On May 1, 2011, President Barack Obama announced that Osama bin Laden was killed earlier that day by "a small team of Americans" operating in Abbottabad, Pakistan, during a CIA operation. The raid was executed from a CIA forward base in Afghanistan by elements of the U.S. Navy's Naval Special Warfare Development Group and CIA paramilitary operatives.

It resulted in the acquisition of extensive intelligence on the future attack plans of Al-Qaeda.

The operation was a result of years of intelligence work that included the CIA's capture and interrogation of Khalid Sheik Mohammad (KSM), which led to the identity of a courier of Bin Laden's, the tracking of the courier to the compound by Special Activities Division paramilitary operatives and the establishing of a CIA safe house to provide critical tactical intelligence for the operation.

== Reorganization ==
On 6 March 2015, the office of the D/CIA issued an unclassified edition of a statement by the director, titled 'Our Agency's Blueprint for the Future', as a press release for public consumption. The press release announced sweeping plans for the reorganization and reform of the CIA, which the director believes will bring the CIA more in line with the Agency doctrine called the 'Strategic Direction'. Among the principal changes disclosed include the establishment of a new directorate, the Directorate of Digital Innovation. Other changes which were announced include the formation of a Talent Development Centre of Excellence, the enhancement and expansion of the CIA University and the creation of the office of the Chancellor to head the CIA University in order to consolidate and unify recruitment and training efforts. The National Clandestine Service (NCS) will be reverting to its original Directorate name, the Directorate of Operations. The Directorate of Intelligence is also being renamed; it will now be the Directorate of Analysis.
