= John O. Bell =

American ambassador (1912–2000)

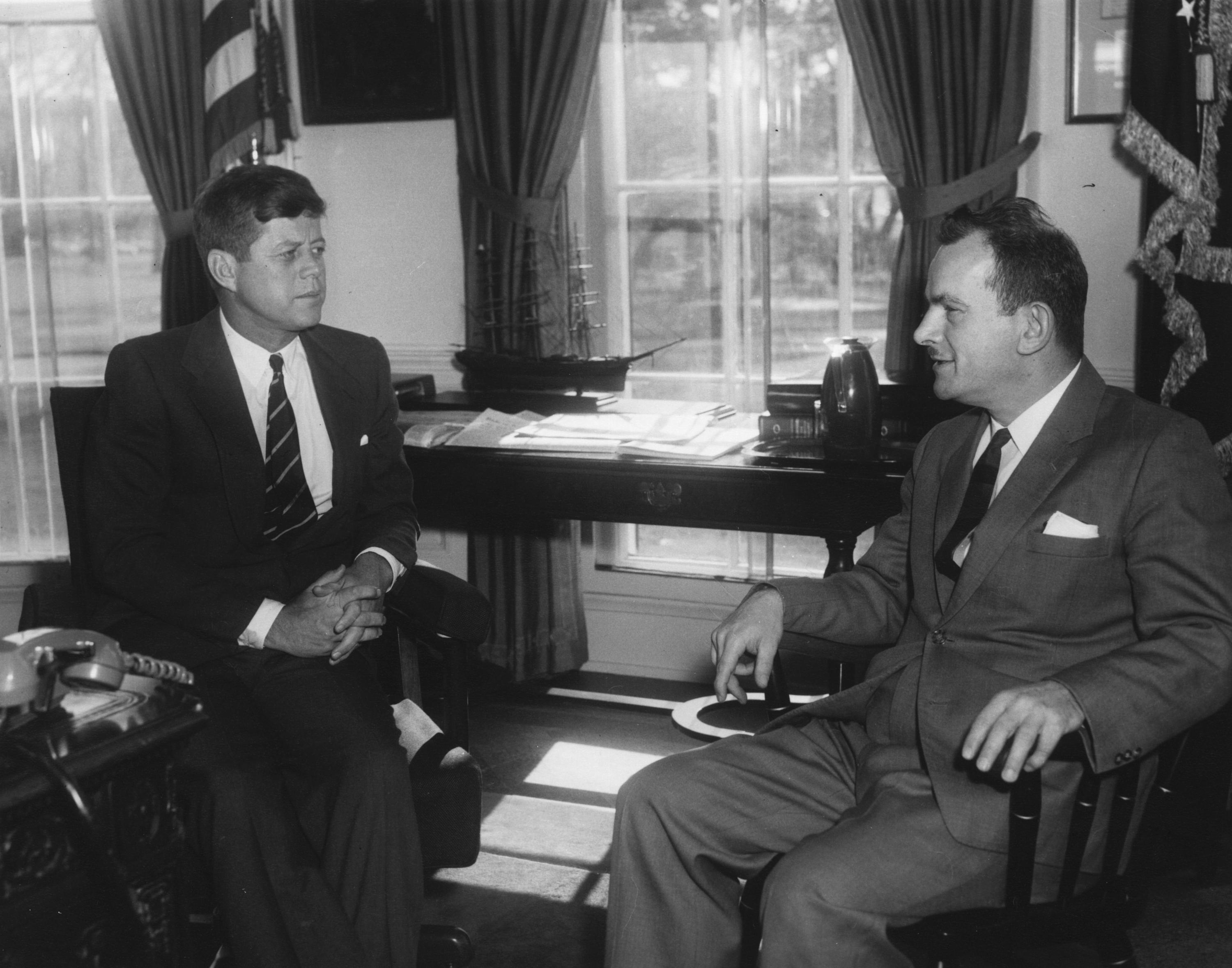
- John F. Kennedy and John O. Bell in 1961

United States Ambassador to Guatemala
- In office January 30, 1962 – August 26, 1965
- President: John F. Kennedy
- Preceded by: John J. Muccio
- Succeeded by: John Gordon Mein

Personal details
- Born: October 4, 1912
- Died: December 31, 2000 (aged 88)
- Education: George Washington University

John Oscar Bell (October 4, 1912 – December 31, 2000) was an American diplomat and the US Ambassador to Guatemala from 1962 to 1965. After his time as ambassador, Bell worked as a Foreign Policy Advisor at the United States Strike Command (STRICOM) in Florida.

== Early life and family ==
Bell was born October 4, 1912 in Manila, Philippines. Bell's career in the State Department began at 19 years old, working as a clerk. He graduated from George Washington University (GWU) in 1934 with a bachelor's degree in chemistry. Afterwards, Bell became a lawyer, graduating with his JD from GWU in 1939. Bell was married twice: first to Jeannette S. Bell and later to Ann Bell. He had three children and two stepdaughters.

== Foreign Service career ==
He officially joined the Foreign Service in 1952. His first position as a Foreign Service Officer (FSO) was as Deputy Chief of the ECA Mission and an Economic Officer at the US Embassy in Copenhagen. In 1956, Bell became the chargé d'affaires when Ambassador Eugenie Anderson decided to step down from her position. He also took on the Mission Director position in Copenhagen.

From 1955 to 1957, Bell was the Chief of U.S. Operations Mission of International Cooperation Administration (ICA) in Karachi, Pakistan. In this position he worked to organize large-scale US economic aid for Pakistan with Economic Officer David Bell. While working in Pakistan, Bell hosted Prime Minister Huseyn Shaheed Suhrawardy at his home. After only two years, Bell was asked to become the Assistant Administrator for Near East and South Asia in ICA. This position had him managing the administration of economic aid to sixteen countries. Just 15 months later, he was promoted to Deputy for Foreign Aid Coordination which worked directly under the President and not the Secretary of State. On March 25, 1963, Bell was awarded the Distinguished Service Award by the Department of State for his "outstanding contributions to the conduct of United States foreign policy" in this position.

In 1961 President John F. Kennedy abolished the ICA and transferred all of its functions to the newly created United States Agency for International Development (USAID). Bell worked as a Deputy Chief of a task force until he was made the Ambassador to Guatemala in 1962.

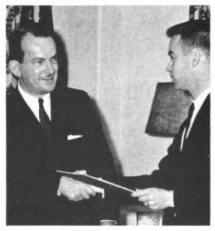
John O. Bell (left) presents an Honor Award to Francis J. McNeil, a Political Officer in 1962

== Ambassador to Guatemala ==
With the upcoming election in 1963 and the general discontent with the pro-American president, Miguel Ydígoras Fuentes, Guatemalan statesman and previous president Juan José Arévalo planned to return to Guatemala from exile in Mexico to run for president again. Bell was largely against Arévalo. In a letter to the Department of State, he called Arévalo "passionately and pathologically antagonistic to the United States and all its works." As with anything anti-American during this period, Arévalo was labelled a communist by both the US Government and Bell. Thus, the Kennedy administration supported a Guatemalan military coup in 1963 to overthrow Ydígoras and prevent the election of Arévalo, an action which Bell insisted upon.

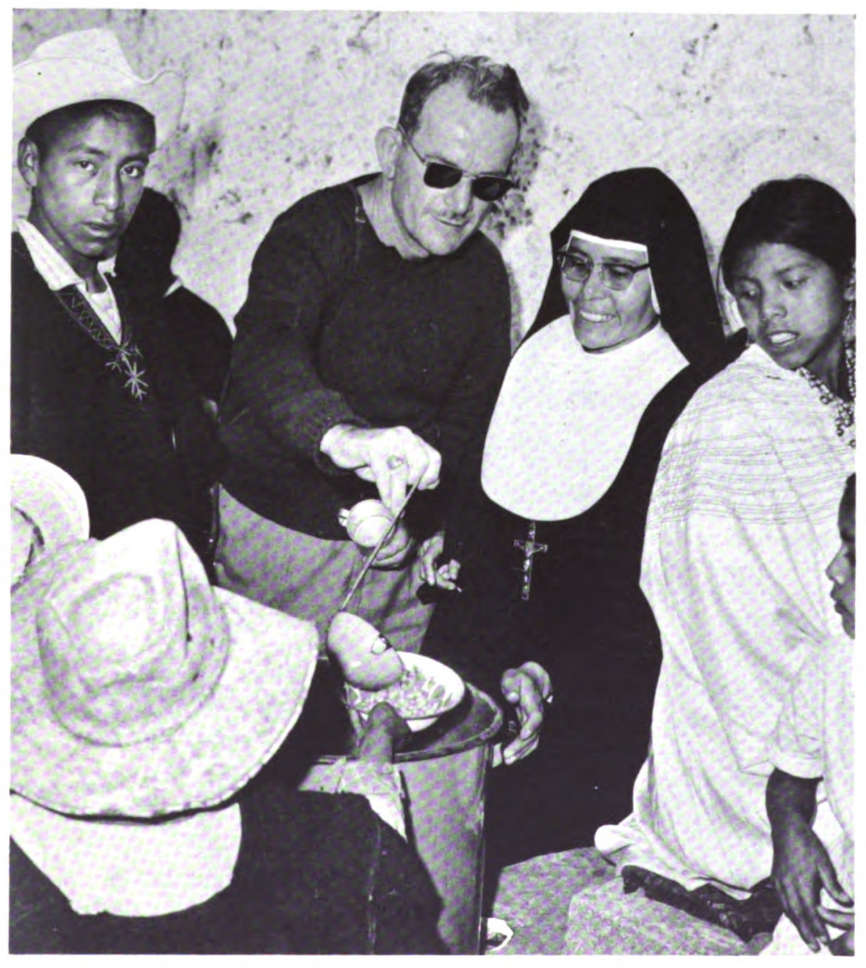
Bell distributes food to native Guatemalan schoolchildren in 1964

Enrique Peralta Azurdia, the general who replaced Ydígoras after the coup, immediately repressed opposition to his regime, voided the constitution, and shut down congress. Bell remained optimistic, however, and believed Peralta intended to make a one-party system modeled after the Mexican government.

The situation in Guatemala worsened and anti-American sentiment grew. By 1965, officials in Washington were increasingly fearful of guerillas in Guatemala due to the Marxist guerilla movement in Cuba led by Che Guevara. They advised the embassy to protect US citizens against these guerilla threats. In response, Bell wrote

I must express my dismay and irritation at Dept's reaction every time raw report is received suggesting terrorist action. Dept appears either [to] have little confidence in my judgment or ... are writing for record should something eventually happen. If first is true, Department should replace me now. If second case, this [is] not helpful and I suggest desist.

He was replaced shortly after with John G. Mein.

== Retirement ==
Bell retired from the Foreign Service in 1969. He took up teaching at the University of South Florida where he taught for 14 years. In 1988, Bell was interviewed by Arthur L. Lowrie for the Association for Diplomatic Studies and Training about his career in the Foreign Service. He died in Temple Terrace, Florida at the age of 88.
