= List of ambassadors of the United States to Guatemala =

Ambassador of the United States to Guatemala
- Seal of the United States Department of State

- Flag of a United States ambassador

- Incumbent; Jorgan K. Andrews; Chargé d'affaires since April 20, 2026
- Style: His Excellency
- Nominator: The president of the United States
- Appointer: The president; with Senate advice and consent
- Inaugural holder: John Williams as Chargé d'Affaires
- Formation: May 3, 1826
- Website: U.S. Embassy - Guatemala

The following is a list of ambassadors of the United States, or other chiefs of mission, to Guatemala. The title given by the United States State Department to this position is currently Ambassador Extraordinary and Plenipotentiary.

Representative	Title	Presentation of credentials	Termination of mission	Appointed by
John Williams	Chargé d'Affaires	May 3, 1826	December 1, 1826	John Quincy Adams
Charles G. DeWitt	Chargé d'Affaires	December 17, 1833	January 1, 1839	Andrew Jackson
Elijah Hise	Chargé d'Affaires	January 31, 1849	June 23, 1849	James K. Polk
Solon Borland	Envoy Extraordinary and Minister Plenipotentiary		December 31, 1854	Franklin Pierce
John L. Marling	Minister Resident	February 14, 1855	May 8, 1856	Franklin Pierce
Beverly L. Clarke	Minister Resident	July 13, 1858	March 17, 1860	James Buchanan
Elisha Oscar Crosby	Minister Resident	May 28, 1861	June 22, 1864	Abraham Lincoln
Fitz Henry Warren	Minister Resident	June 27, 1866	August 11, 1869	Andrew Johnson
Silas A. Hudson	Minister Resident	August 11, 1869	October 12, 1872	Ulysses S. Grant
George Williamson	Minister Resident	September 9, 1873	January 31, 1879	Ulysses S. Grant
Cornelius A. Logan	Minister Resident	June 11, 1879	April 12, 1882	Rutherford B. Hayes
Henry C. Hall	Minister Resident	July 25, 1882	August 10, 1882	Chester A. Arthur
Henry C. Hall	Envoy Extraordinary and Minister Plenipotentiary	August 10, 1882	May 15, 1889	Chester A. Arthur
Lansing B. Mizner	Envoy Extraordinary and Minister Plenipotentiary	June 4, 1889	December 31, 1890	Benjamin Harrison
Romualdo Pacheco	Envoy Extraordinary and Minister Plenipotentiary	February 28, 1891	June 12, 1893	Benjamin Harrison
Pierce M. B. Young	Envoy Extraordinary and Minister Plenipotentiary	June 12, 1893	May 23, 1896	Grover Cleveland
Macgrane Coxe	Envoy Extraordinary and Minister Plenipotentiary	September 29, 1896	June 30, 1897	Grover Cleveland
W. Godfrey Hunter	Envoy Extraordinary and Minister Plenipotentiary	January 25, 1898	February 2, 1903	William McKinley
Leslie Combs	Envoy Extraordinary and Minister Plenipotentiary	February 2, 1903	February 25, 1907	Theodore Roosevelt
Joseph W. J. Lee	Envoy Extraordinary and Minister Plenipotentiary	March 19, 1907	October 13, 1907	Theodore Roosevelt
William Heimke	Envoy Extraordinary and Minister Plenipotentiary	May 2, 1908	September 30, 1909	Theodore Roosevelt
William Franklin Sands	Envoy Extraordinary and Minister Plenipotentiary	October 9, 1909	October 14, 1910	William H. Taft
R. S. Reynolds Hitt	Envoy Extraordinary and Minister Plenipotentiary	October 14, 1910	March 4, 1913	William H. Taft
William Hayne Leavell	Envoy Extraordinary and Minister Plenipotentiary	November 29, 1913	October 24, 1918	Woodrow Wilson
Benton McMillin	Envoy Extraordinary and Minister Plenipotentiary	January 15, 1920	December 6, 1921	Woodrow Wilson
Arthur H. Geissler	Envoy Extraordinary and Minister Plenipotentiary	July 31, 1922	January 23, 1930	Warren G. Harding
Sheldon Whitehouse	Envoy Extraordinary and Minister Plenipotentiary	March 21, 1930	July 23, 1933	Herbert Hoover
Matthew E. Hanna	Envoy Extraordinary and Minister Plenipotentiary	October 28, 1933	February 9, 1936	Franklin D. Roosevelt
Fay A. Des Portes	Envoy Extraordinary and Minister Plenipotentiary	May 22, 1936	May 14, 1943	Franklin D. Roosevelt
Boaz Long	Ambassador Extraordinary and Plenipotentiary	May 19, 1943	April 11, 1945	Franklin D. Roosevelt
Edwin Jackson Kyle	Ambassador Extraordinary and Plenipotentiary	May 8, 1945	August 22, 1948	Franklin D. Roosevelt
Richard C. Patterson, Jr.	Ambassador Extraordinary and Plenipotentiary	November 24, 1948	April 24, 1951	Harry S. Truman
Rudolf E. Schoenfeld	Ambassador Extraordinary and Plenipotentiary	April 24, 1951	October 19, 1953	Harry S. Truman
John Peurifoy	Ambassador Extraordinary and Plenipotentiary	November 4, 1953	October 2, 1954	Dwight D. Eisenhower
Norman Armour	Ambassador Extraordinary and Plenipotentiary	October 18, 1954	May 9, 1955	Dwight D. Eisenhower
Edward J. Sparks	Ambassador Extraordinary and Plenipotentiary	July 29, 1955	February 15, 1958	Dwight D. Eisenhower
Lester D. Mallory	Ambassador Extraordinary and Plenipotentiary	February 27, 1958	November 11, 1959	Dwight D. Eisenhower
John J. Muccio	Ambassador Extraordinary and Plenipotentiary	February 1, 1960	November 10, 1961	Dwight D. Eisenhower
John O. Bell	Ambassador Extraordinary and Plenipotentiary	January 30, 1962	August 26, 1965	John F. Kennedy
John Gordon Mein	Ambassador Extraordinary and Plenipotentiary	September 22, 1965	August 28, 1968	Lyndon B. Johnson
Nathaniel Davis	Ambassador Extraordinary and Plenipotentiary	November 21, 1968	August 21, 1971	Lyndon B. Johnson
William G. Bowdler	Ambassador Extraordinary and Plenipotentiary	October 19, 1971	August 26, 1973	Richard Nixon
Francis E. Meloy, Jr.	Ambassador Extraordinary and Plenipotentiary	February 7, 1974	April 19, 1976	Richard Nixon
Davis E. Boster	Ambassador Extraordinary and Plenipotentiary	October 13, 1976	January 17, 1979	Gerald Ford
Frank V. Ortiz, Jr.	Ambassador Extraordinary and Plenipotentiary	July 17, 1979	August 6, 1980	Jimmy Carter
Frederic L. Chapin	Ambassador Extraordinary and Plenipotentiary	September 3, 1981	February 28, 1984	Ronald Reagan
Alberto Martinez Piedra	Ambassador Extraordinary and Plenipotentiary	August 17, 1984	August 22, 1987	Ronald Reagan
James H. Michel	Ambassador Extraordinary and Plenipotentiary	October 28, 1987	September 1, 1989	Ronald Reagan
Thomas F. Stroock	Ambassador Extraordinary and Plenipotentiary	October 31, 1989	November 10, 1992	George H. W. Bush
Marilyn McAfee	Ambassador Extraordinary and Plenipotentiary	June 16, 1993	June 20, 1996	Bill Clinton
Donald J. Planty	Ambassador Extraordinary and Plenipotentiary	August 22, 1996	August 14, 1999	Bill Clinton
Prudence Bushnell	Ambassador Extraordinary and Plenipotentiary	October 14, 1999	June 15, 2002	Bill Clinton
John Randle Hamilton	Ambassador Extraordinary and Plenipotentiary	January 3, 2003	July 15, 2005	George W. Bush
James M. Derham	Ambassador Extraordinary and Plenipotentiary	September 1, 2005	July 15, 2008	George W. Bush
Stephen G. McFarland	Ambassador Extraordinary and Plenipotentiary	August 5, 2008	August 25, 2011	George W. Bush
Arnold A. Chacón	Ambassador Extraordinary and Plenipotentiary	August 29, 2011	March 5, 2014	Barack Obama
Todd D. Robinson	Ambassador Extraordinary and Plenipotentiary	September 16, 2014	September 20, 2017	Barack Obama
David Hodge	Chargé d'Affaires	September 20, 2017	October 3, 2017	Donald Trump
Luis E. Arreaga	Ambassador Extraordinary and Plenipotentiary	October 3, 2017	October 2, 2020	Donald Trump
William W. Popp	Ambassador Extraordinary and Plenipotentiary	October 19, 2020	August 24, 2023	Donald Trump
Patrick Ventrell	Chargé d'Affaires	August 24, 2023	February 2, 2024	Joe Biden
Tobin John Bradley	Ambassador Extraordinary and Plenipotentiary	February 12, 2024	January 17, 2026	Joe Biden
John M. Barrett	Chargé d'Affaires	January 23, 2026	April 20, 2026	Donald Trump
Jorgan K. Andrews	Chargé d'Affaires	April 20, 2026	Present	Donald Trump

== See also ==
- Foreign relations of Guatemala
- Ambassadors of the United States
