= Donald J. Planty =

American diplomat

Donald James Planty (born 1945) is an American diplomat. He served as United States Ambassador to Guatemala from 1996 to 1999. He is currently a Senior Advisor at Albright Stonebridge Group.

== Biography ==
=== Early life ===
Donald Planty was born in Lowville, New York in 1945. He graduated from Fordham University in 1966 and received an M.A. in Political Science from the University of New Mexico in 1970. In 1964, while at Fordham, he attended the Pontifical Catholic University of Chile in Santiago, Chile on a Fulbright-Hays grant. At UNM, he was a teaching assistant in the Peace Corps Training Center for Latin America.

=== Career ===
In 1967, he started his career as a caseworker for the New York City Department of Social Services. He was Ambassador-in-residence at the National War College in Washington, D.C. from 1984 to 1985. He served as U.S. Ambassador to Guatemala from 1996 to 1999, facilitating the 1996 Peace Accords.

=== Personal life ===
He has three sons: Reverend Donald J. Planty, Jr. (Rev. St Charles Catholic Church, Arlington, VA), Matthew, and Mark.

== Bibliography ==
- Donald J. Planty, Security Sector Transformation in the Arab Awakening, (United States Institute of Peace, 2012).

Diplomatic posts
Preceded by Marilyn McAfee	United States Ambassador to Guatemala; 1996-1999	Succeeded by Prudence Bushnell
