= John Gordon Mein =

American diplomat (1913–1968)

United States Ambassador to Guatemala
- In office September 22, 1965 – August 28, 1968
- President: Lyndon B. Johnson
- Preceded by: John O. Bell
- Succeeded by: Nathaniel Davis

Personal details
- Born: September 10, 1913 Cadiz, Kentucky, U.S.
- Died: August 28, 1968 (aged 54) Guatemala City, Guatemala
- Resting place: Rock Creek Cemetery; Washington, D.C., U.S.
- Profession: Diplomat

John Gordon Mein (September 10, 1913 – August 28, 1968) was an American diplomat who served as the United States ambassador to Guatemala. He was the first United States ambassador to be assassinated while serving in office.

== Early career ==
John Gordon Mein was born on September 10, 1913, in Cadiz, Kentucky. He graduated from Georgetown College in Kentucky, and later went on to earn his LL.B. from George Washington University and some graduate work at American University. Mein joined the Foreign Service in 1942. He worked in Rio de Janeiro, Rome, Oslo, Jakarta, and Manila. In Manila, Mein was a counselor at the US Embassy, with the personal rank of Minister. He was also the one-time director of the Office of Southwest Pacific Affairs. From 1953 to 1954, Mein attended the National War College. On January 20, 1963, Mein was assigned as Deputy Chief of Mission in Rio de Janeiro.

In 1959, Mein was presented with the Meritorious Honor Award.

== Ambassadorship and assassination ==
Mein served as the United States Ambassador to Guatemala during the Guatemalan Civil War. It was during his tenure that alleged U.S.-backed state terrorism which started after the 1954 Guatemalan coup d'état greatly accelerated with forced disappearances and massacres. He was shot by rebels belonging to the Rebel Armed Forces (FAR) one block from the U.S. consulate on Avenida Reforma in Guatemala City on August 28, 1968. U.S. officials believed that FAR intended to kidnap him in order to negotiate an exchange, but instead they shot him when he attempted to escape. The rebels had killed two U.S. military aides prior to the assassination of Mein.

Emilio Arenales Catalán, Guatemala's Foreign Minister, eulogized Mein as having "extraordinary qualities as a diplomat who always respected the rights of others, for being a sincere friend of Guatemala and for the interest that he always demonstrated in the democracy, stability and progress of Guatemala and its people."

Mein is buried at Rock Creek Cemetery, in Washington, D.C. The cover of the September 1968 edition of the State Department Newsletter is dedicated to commemorating him. Mein was also memorialized in the Department's Diplomatic Lobby along with other Foreign Service personnel that have died in the line of duty.

== See also ==
- Ambassadors of the United States killed in office

Diplomatic posts
Preceded by John O. Bell	United States Ambassador to Guatemala; September 22, 1965 – August 28, 1968	Succeeded by Nathaniel Davis
