= Thomas F. Stroock =

American politician

Thomas F. Strook

United States Ambassador to Guatemala
- In office 1989–1992
- President: George H. W. Bush
- Preceded by: James H. Michel
- Succeeded by: Marilyn McAfee

State Senator from Natrona County, Wyoming
- In office 1967–1967
- In office 1971–1974
- In office 1979–1989

Personal details
- Born: October 10, 1925 New York City, U.S.
- Died: December 13, 2009 (aged 84) Casper, Wyoming, U.S.
- Party: Republican
- Spouse: Marta Stroock
- Children: 4
- Education: Yale University
- Occupation: Oil executive

Military service
- Branch/service: United States Marine Corps
- Battles/wars: World War II

Thomas F. Stroock (October 10, 1925 – December 13, 2009) was an American businessman, ambassador, and a Republican politician from Casper, Wyoming.

== Biography ==
=== Early life ===
Born in New York City, Stroock attended Yale University in New Haven, Connecticut, alongside future U.S. President George Herbert Walker Bush. He was a member of Chi Phi fraternity. After graduation, he served in the United States Marine Corps during World War II and then relocated to Wyoming, where he devoted his remaining years. He was brought to Casper, Wyoming in 1949 by his current employer, the Stanolind Oil and Gas Company.

=== Career ===
Upon settling in Casper, he founded several petroleum companies.

He served as a member of the Wyoming State Senate from Natrona County in 1967, from 1971 to 1974, and finally from 1979 to 1989. He was the Senate vice president in 1989. In 1974, he left the state Senate to run unsuccessfully on the GOP ticket for Wyoming's at-large seat in the United States House of Representatives, having been defeated by the incumbent Democrat Teno Roncalio.

In 1989, he was named United States Ambassador to Guatemala by his former Yale classmate President Bush. He held that post until 1992.

In 1989, he was named United States Ambassador to Guatemala by his former Yale classmate President Bush. He held that post until 1992. During his time as ambassador, he fought against drug trafficking. He also had to handle the case of the American nun Dianna Ortiz, who had been abducted, raped, and tortured by the Guatemalan military, with possible complicity of the United States, and whose account he was unwilling to accept.

=== Personal life ===
He and his wife, Marta, had four daughters. He died on December 13, 2009, at the age of eighty-four.

Diplomatic posts
Preceded by James H. Michel	United States Ambassador to Guatemala; October 31, 1989 – November 10, 1992	Succeeded by Marilyn McAfee
