= Marilyn McAfee =

American diplomat and U.S. ambassador in Guatemala

United States Ambassador to Guatemala
- In office June 16, 1993 – June 20, 1996
- President: Bill Clinton
- Preceded by: Thomas F. Stroock
- Succeeded by: Donald J. Planty

Personal details
- Born: 1940 (age 85–86)
- Education: University of Pennsylvania; Johns Hopkins University
- Occupation: Diplomat

Marilyn McAfee (born 1940) is a retired American diplomat who served as the United States Ambassador to Guatemala.

== Early life ==
McAfee was a history major at the University of Pennsylvania. After graduation, she attended Johns Hopkins University where she earned a master's degree.

== Career ==
After Johns Hopkins, she began her eventual 31-year career as a foreign service officer. During her career, she spent four and a half years in Iran followed by three years in Washington, D.C. on the "Iran Desk" during the Iranian Revolution of 1979 and hostage crisis. She was also responsible for Afghanistan and Pakistan, both of which she visited multiple times. During her tenure, she spent ten weeks in Israel on official travel and also served as Assistant Secretary General for Inspections in the Office of the Inspector General of the Department of State, which necessitated her travel for extended inspection visits to Russia, South Africa and China.

Besides the Middle East, much of her time was spent in Latin America, primarily Nicaragua, Costa Rica, Venezuela, Chile, and Bolivia where she was Deputy Chief of Mission with special responsibilities as Coordinator, Counter Narcotics Operations. On May 28, 1993, she was appointed United States Ambassador to Guatemala by U.S. President Bill Clinton. She presented her credentials on June 16, 1993, and served until she left her post on June 20, 1996. McAffee had begun her career in Guatemala. While in Guatemala, McAfee focused on "supporting the institutionalization of democracy" and is also remembered for her focus on human rights.

=== Murphy Memo ===
While in Guatemala, the Central Intelligence Agency produced the "Murphy Memo" in 1994 based on audio recordings made by bugs planted in McAfee's bedroom that were placed by Guatemalan intelligence. In the recording, McAfee verbally entreated "Murphy". The CIA circulated a memo in the highest Washington circles accusing her of having an extramarital lesbian affair with her secretary, Carol Murphy. However, there was no affair as the truth was McAfee was calling to Murphy, her two-year-old black standard poodle. Reportedly, the Guatemalan military resented McAfee's "emphasis on human rights had a plan to embarrass the Ambassador publicly, besmirch her reputation and damage the United States Embassy by spreading false rumors about her personal life." The incident was revealed in 1997 during George Tenet's Senate confirmation hearings to become head of the CIA.

=== Later career ===
After her retirement from the diplomatic service, she served six years as President of the World Affairs Council of Jacksonville (and served on the National Board of the World Affairs Councils of America). She also participated in the World Affairs Councils of America special delegation visits to Morocco, Egypt, Jordan and Baghdad in January 2009 at the invitation of Ambassador Ryan Crocker.

She has lectured for National Geographic and World Affairs Councils of America.

== Personal life ==
Ambassador McAfee, who was married, makes her home in Ponte Vedra Beach, Florida and is a member of the University of North Florida Foundation Board, the Board of Baptist Medical Center Beaches, and the Rotary International Foundation Board in Downtown Jacksonville.

=== Awards and honors ===
McAfee was awarded the Presidential Meritorious Award, the Superior Honor Award and the Distinguished Honor Award. She was promoted to the rank of Career Minister in 1997. She has been listed in Who's Who in America, Who's Who of American Women, Who's Who in American Politics. In 2005, McAfee was awarded The Florida Times-Union's Eve Award for Outstanding Volunteer Service.

Diplomatic posts
Preceded by Thomas F. Stroock	United States Ambassador to Guatemala; June 16, 1993–June 20, 1996	Succeeded by Donald J. Planty
