= Hans V. Tofte =

Danish-American intelligence officer

- Born: April 4, 1911; Copenhagen, Denmark
- Died: August 24, 1987 (aged 76)
- Military career
- Allegiance: Denmark; United Kingdom; United States
- Branch: British Army; Special Operations Executive; United States Army; Office of Strategic Services; Central Intelligence Agency
- Service years: 1943–1966
- Rank: Major(United_States) (OSS)
- Conflicts: World War II: China Burma India theater; Yugoslav theater; Korean War: Chief of Korea CIA Mission; Joint Advisory Commission, Korea (JACK)
- Awards: Legion of Merit; Order of Yugoslavia; Dannebrogordenen (Ridderkors)

Hans Vilhelm Tofte (April 4, 1911 – August 24, 1987) was a Danish-American intelligence officer from Frederiksberg, Denmark who had a long career with the CIA.

== Biography ==
Hans V. Tofte began his career in the Danish East Asiatic Company, where he developed business connections that would help him later in life. In 1940, he joined the Danish resistance during World War II. In 1941, he had to flee Denmark after coming to the attention of the German Gestapo. He subsequently joined the British army and carried out operations in the far east, including Burma (Myanmar) and China. Once again, he was forced to flee. He then went to the United States and joined the U.S. Army. In 1943, he was assigned as an Office of Strategic Services (OSS) instructor and commissioned as a captain. He later volunteered to go to Europe to conduct operations there. His OSS service was mainly in Yugoslavia and Italy, helping Yugoslavian partisans. He was later recognized with a Legion of Merit award for his OSS service in Yugoslavia during WWII. After WWII, Tofte moved back to the United States in 1948 and ran a business in Mason City, Iowa. He thought he had found his career and settled down until the outbreak of the Korean War. He was called back into intelligence service but now joined the newly formed Central Intelligence Agency. He was made head of the CIA in Korea during the Korean War. He helped to train South Korea guerrillas who would infiltrate North Korea and fight them behind the lines. Perhaps his most audacious operation was known as TP-Stole. TP-Stole was an operation conducted in 1951 to prevent the communist Chinese forces receiving medical supplies. A shipment of supplies destined to resupply Chinese troops was hijacked by the Chinese Nationalist Navy disguised as pirates. This was a very important operation and delayed the Chinese spring offensive by three months, potentially saving thousands of lives.

Tofte continued his career as a CIA officer, later operating in various countries in the Americas. He was involved in the 1954 Guatemalan coup d'état (also known as PBSuccess) in Guatemala, which ousted president Jacobo Arbenz. He was later active in Colombia, before returning to the US to work at CIA headquarters in Langley. Tofte's CIA career ended ignominiously when classified documents were discovered in his house in 1966. He had put his Washington DC house up for sale and a fellow CIA officer, who had come to see the house, noticed classified papers he had brought there. Tofte always claimed that he had brought them home because he was writing a training manual. He eventually settled with the CIA, leaving the agency and keeping his pension in 1967. Tofte, eventually retired to Gilbertsville, New York.

He died August 24, 1987.

== Bibliography ==
- CIA In Korea: 1946-1965 (Report). CIA. 1973.
- Gulden, Joseph (1982). Korea: The Untold Story of the War. New York: Times Books.
- Krüger, Hendrik (2005). Hans V. Tofte: Den Danske krigshelt, der kom til tops I CIA. Egmont: Linghardt og Ringhof.
