= Monnett =

Monnett may refer to:

== People ==
- Mary Monnett Bain (born Mary Monnett) (1833–1885), American Methodist
- Monnett Bain Davis (1893–1953), American Ambassador
- Bob Monnett (1910–1978), professional American football player
- Charles Monnett Arctic Wildlife biologist with U.S. Bureau of Ocean Energy Management, Regulation and Enforcement

== Aircraft ==
- Sonex Aircraft, American aircraft kit manufacturer located in Oshkosh, Wisconsin founded by John Monnett
- Monnett Sonerai, small, VW powered homebuilt aircraft designed by John Monnett
- Monnett Experimental Aircraft, United States aircraft manufacturer
- Monnett Mini, also called the Mini Messashidt, was an early John Monnett modification of the Parker Jeanies Teenie
- Monnett Monerai, sailplane that was developed in the United States in the late 1970s for homebuilding
- Monnett Monex, single seat, all-aluminium, Volkswagen powered, homebuilt racer
- Monnett Moni, sport aircraft developed in the United States in the early 1980s and marketed for homebuilding

== Other uses ==
- Monnett, Ohio, unincorporated community in Dallas Township, Crawford County, Ohio, United States
- Monnett (social network), social network developed in Luxembourg

== See also ==
- Monnett Memorial M. E. Chapel (Monnett Chapel) is a historic church at 999 OH 98 in Bucyrus, Ohio
- Monnett Hall or Ohio Women's Methodist Seminary, seminary located in Delaware, Ohio
- Monnet (disambiguation)
