= JetBeetle Tarantula H90 =

Tarantula H90
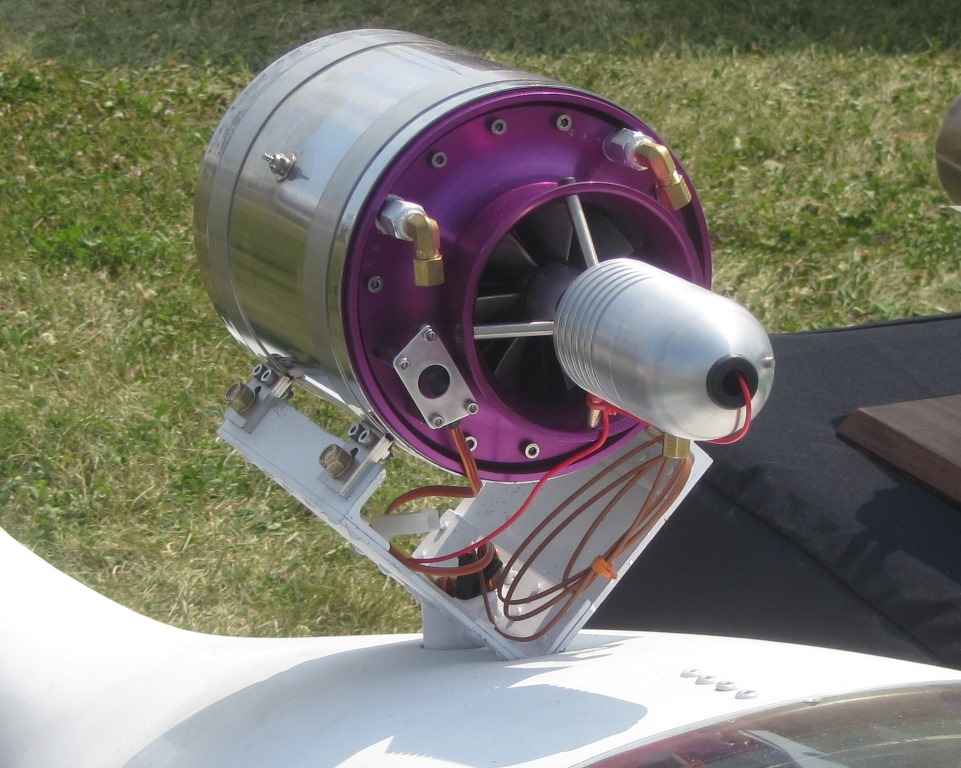
- JetBeetle Tarantula H90 engine on a Monnett Monerai

General information
- Type: Small gas turbine
- National origin: United States
- Manufacturer: JetBeetle

The JetBeetle Tarantula H90 is an American gas-turbine engine for use on Homebuilt aircraft

It is capable of producing 90 lbf (0.40 kN) thrust at 88,900rpm.

== Variants ==
Tarantula H90
90 lbf (0.40 kN)
Tarantula H100 (Updated H90 released summer 2016)
105 lbf (0.47 kN)

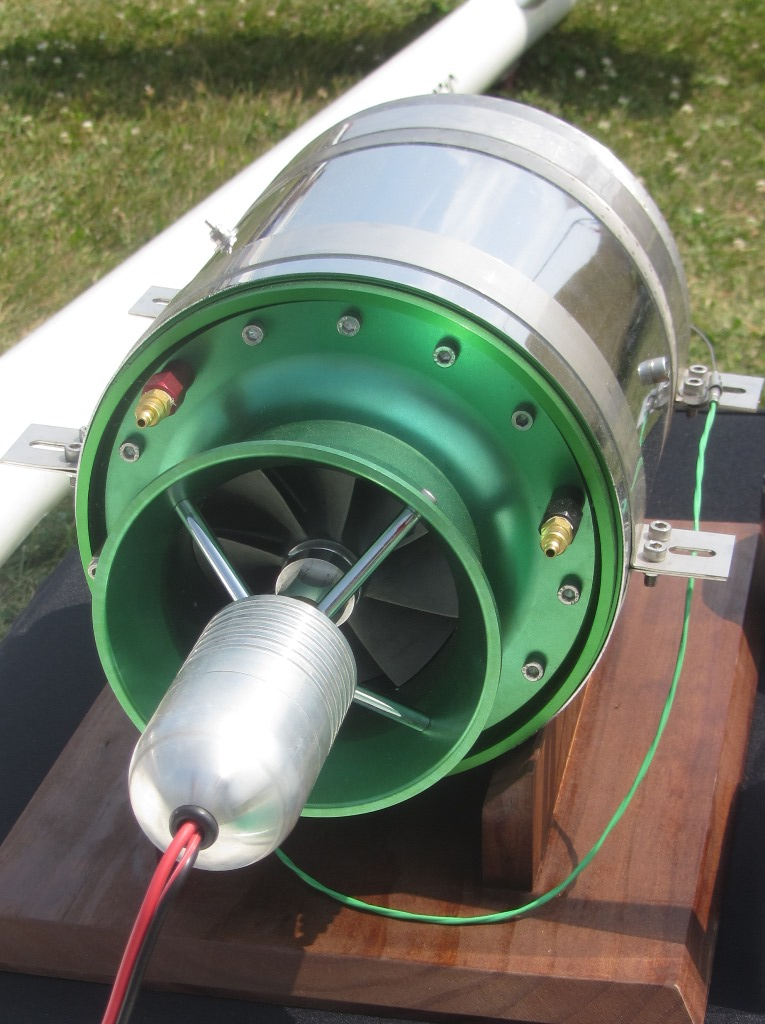
JetBeetle Locust H150R

Locust H150R
170 lbf (0.76 kN)

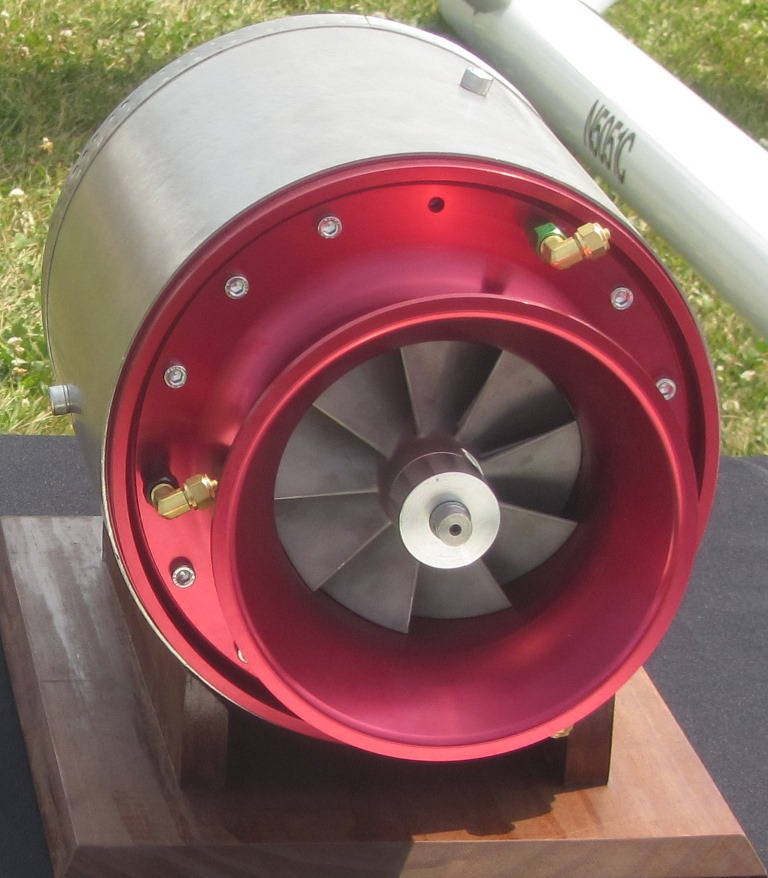
JetBeetle Mantis H250

Mantis H250
250 lbf (1.11 kN)

== Applications ==
- Monnett Monerai

== Specifications (Tarantula H90) ==
Data from JetBeetle

==== General characteristics ====
- Type: Turbofan
- Length: 475 mm (18.7 in) with starter
- Diameter: 165 mm (6.5 in)
- Dry weight: 16.5 lb (7.5 kg) with starter

==== Components ====
- Compressor: single stage centrifugal
- Combustors: Annular combustion chamber
- Turbine: single stage axial
- Fuel type: Kerosene

==== Performance ====
- Maximum thrust: 105 lbf (0.47 kN) max continuous
- Thrust-to-weight ratio: 6.3
