= Ohio Women's Methodist Seminary =

Seminary in ohio

The Ohio Women's Methodist Seminary was a seminary located in Delaware, Ohio.

The seminary provided general educational opportunities to women in an era when co-educational institutions of higher learning were not yet fully open to students of both sexes. The Women's Seminary was governed by a board of directors chosen by the Methodist Episcopal Church, which oversaw the operation, and ensured that the curriculum was in keeping with church teachings.

== History ==
In 1850 following the success of the Oberlin College, a seminary was started by the Rev. William Grissell and his wife. It was only there for two years in the old Delaware Academy building before the idea was take up by a group of Methodists from William Street Church. They were led by the Reverend John Quigley and they had been meeting in the Grissell's building and therefore the continuation of a college would also allow them a place to continue having Methodist meetings. They bought the Grissell's building and its small grounds and it was renamed the Delaware Female College and the number of students grew. In 1853 they obtained the larger former hilltop home of William Little for $7,000 and it was again renamed this time as the Ohio Wesleyan Female College. The first President of the college was Oran Faville and his wife, Mary, was the preceptress. They were paid $1000 a year. In 1855 they began to construct Monnett Hall as a hall of residence for the female college replacing two earlier structures. It was named Monnett Hall after a former pupil. Mary Monnett gave the college $10,000 and this allowed the building work to be completed. The Monnet Hall name remained but Mary Monnett married and she became Mrs John W Bain.

In 1866 a group of ex-students and others set themselves the task of creating a library. They were eventually helped by the husband of Mary B James who had been a teacher at the college before she died. He made a gift of $1,000. The executive decided to construct a library within the existing building to house the £1,000 worth of books using $2,000 which they borrowed from the group of ex-students.

Following a fire in 1870 substantial repairs had to be made to the South Wing of the hall although the results were seen as improvements.

In 1877 the college merged with the Ohio Wesleyan University and became its West Campus. In 1977 it celebrated the centenary of this event.

== See also ==
- List of current and historical women's universities and colleges
