= List of coordinate colleges =

Women's colleges linked with men's schools, US

Prior to, and for some time after the Revolutionary War, America's colleges and universities catered almost exclusively to males, following the British and European model. These colleges and universities only gradually opened to co-ed participation at a time when, generally, women seeking to extend their educations would either attend finishing schools, equating to the final years of high school, or a type of women's vocational school: teachers, nursing or (women's) business schools that were designed for female students and task-oriented in outcome. For these, typically, curricula would be designed as two-year courses, providing teachers, nurses, typists, and secretaries for an expanding country where, still, occupational sex roles were culturally enforced, if not as a matter of legislation.

== The rise of four-year women's schools ==
Countering this and to meet growing demand, several academically vigorous women's colleges in the United States were established. While a few were fully independent, more commonly these were set up as "coordinate colleges", enjoying various levels of support or integration with established and nearby men's colleges in the years leading up to World War II. "Coordination" here refers to an array of linkages, including direct administrative connections and even a parent/subordinate school relationship, cross-registration, the award of diplomas from the parent school, and at the student level, desirable social connections. After World War II, the establishment of new coordinated colleges appears to have been curtailed, as these gave way to widespread mergers with men's colleges or the move to make most pre-war single-sex institutions coeducational. Out of this turbulent period some of the coordinated colleges emerged as independent women's or co-educational colleges, while others merged with their male counterparts, or closed.

=== Coordinate colleges versus other types ===
As a class, coordinate colleges were funded and structured quite differently from the finishing schools and business schools for women that had formed in the decades before WWII. Many of the latter were privately owned, for-profit institutions; today, most of these have vanished with only a few, perhaps one or two in each state, evolving into junior colleges themselves or merging into state college systems. Conversely, coordinate colleges can point to an affluent founder (or their partnering male-only school) as their initial and primary supporters; these were structured at the start with the expectation of continuation as long-term foundation- or endowment-supported entities, though none could anticipate the rush to merge or become co-educational in the post-war period. None of the coordinate colleges were investor-owned.

Some, but not all, of the Seven Sisters can be classified as coordinate colleges with a specific originally male-only partner school. However, as a group, they have maintained an equivalent association with the Ivy League schools, conference-to-conference.

Where coordination continues it is most apparent in consortium school relationships (Ivy League and others) to provide cross-registration and mutually accepted financial aid applications.

== Coordinate colleges ==
These colleges include:

School name	Associated institution	Established and range	City	State	Co-ed status	Status	Notes
Bard College (Note: Named St. Stephens College until 1934)	Columbia University	March 1860	Annandale-on-Hudson	New York	Co-ed	Independent, merged, then independent again	(Note: Bard's founders held strong ties with Columbia. Merging with that school in 1928, it would later emerge as an independent, co-ed school in 1944 due to financial pressures and low enrollment as a women-only unit of Columbia.)
Barnard College	Columbia University	1889	Manhattan	New York	Women's	Affiliated	(Note: Barnard maintains a separate board and separate financial structures while cooperating on inter-registration, student life, and other aspects. Its affiliation structure is renegotiated every 15 years in a complex relationship. See Barnard College#Academic affiliations.)
Bethlehem Female Seminary	Moravian University	1742	Germantown, then Bethlehem	Pennsylvania	NA	Merged	
College of Saint Benedict	Saint John's University	1913	St. Joseph	Minnesota	Women's	Semi-merged	
Bryn Mawr College	Haverford College	1885	Bryn Mawr	Pennsylvania	Women's	Bi-College Consortium	
Evelyn College for Women	Princeton University	1887–1897	Princeton	New Jersey	NA	Closed	
H. Sophie Newcomb Memorial College	Tulane University	1886	New Orleans	Louisiana	NA	Merged	
Jackson College for Women	Tufts University	1910	Medford/Somerville	Massachusetts	NA	Merged	
Mills College	Northeastern University	1852	Oakland	California	NA	Merged	(Note: Note that the parent school is in Boston, while Mills is on the West Coast.) (Note: The college briefly opted to become coeducational in 1990, a move that was rescinded that same year due to widespread student protests. After the merger with Northeastern University a plan to once again become all-gender was announced in 2022; several lawsuits were filed in opposition. The merger was finalized in June 2022.)
Mount Holyoke College	Andover Theological Seminary (Note: Andover Theological Seminary was the sister school to Mount Holyoke, providing some coordination at a time when both schools developed missionaries. This gave way over the years reflecting divergent objectives, with Mount Holyoke establishing numerous conference ties. In 1908, the male Andover school moved to the Harvard University campus, and then to Newton Theological Institution in 1931. In 1965 it formally merged with Newton to become Andover Newton Theological School. The school continues as Andover Newton Seminary at Yale Divinity School, a name it adopted in 2017. Thus there is a tenuous connection between Mount Holyoke and Yale.)	1837	South Hadley	Massachusetts	Women's	Independent	
Ohio Wesleyan Female College	Ohio Wesleyan University	1853-1877	Delaware	Ohio	NA	Merged	
Pembroke College	Brown University	1891	Providence	Rhode Island	NA	Merged	
Radcliffe College	Harvard University	1879	Cambridge	Massachusetts	NA	Merged	
Scripps College	Claremont Colleges	1926	Claremont	California	Women's	Consortium member	(Note: Founded a year after the establishment of the Claremont Colleges, an affiliated group of seven adjacent colleges, as an equal partner.)
Spelman College	Morehouse College (Atlanta University Center)	1881	Atlanta	Georgia	Women's	Consortium member	
Tift College	Mercer University	1849-1986	Forsyth, now Macon	Georgia	NA	Merged	
Vassar College	Yale University	1894	Poughkeepsie	New York	Co-ed	Formerly affiliated	
Wellesley College	Massachusetts Institute of Technology	1870	Wellesley	Massachusetts	Women's	Separate	
Westhampton College	Richmond College (University of Richmond)	1914	Richmond	Virginia	Co-ed	Merged (1990)	
William Smith College	Hobart College	1908	Geneva	New York	Women's/NA	Semi-merged	

== See also ==
- Seven Sisters (colleges)
- Timeline of women's colleges in the United States
