= Mary Monnett Bain =

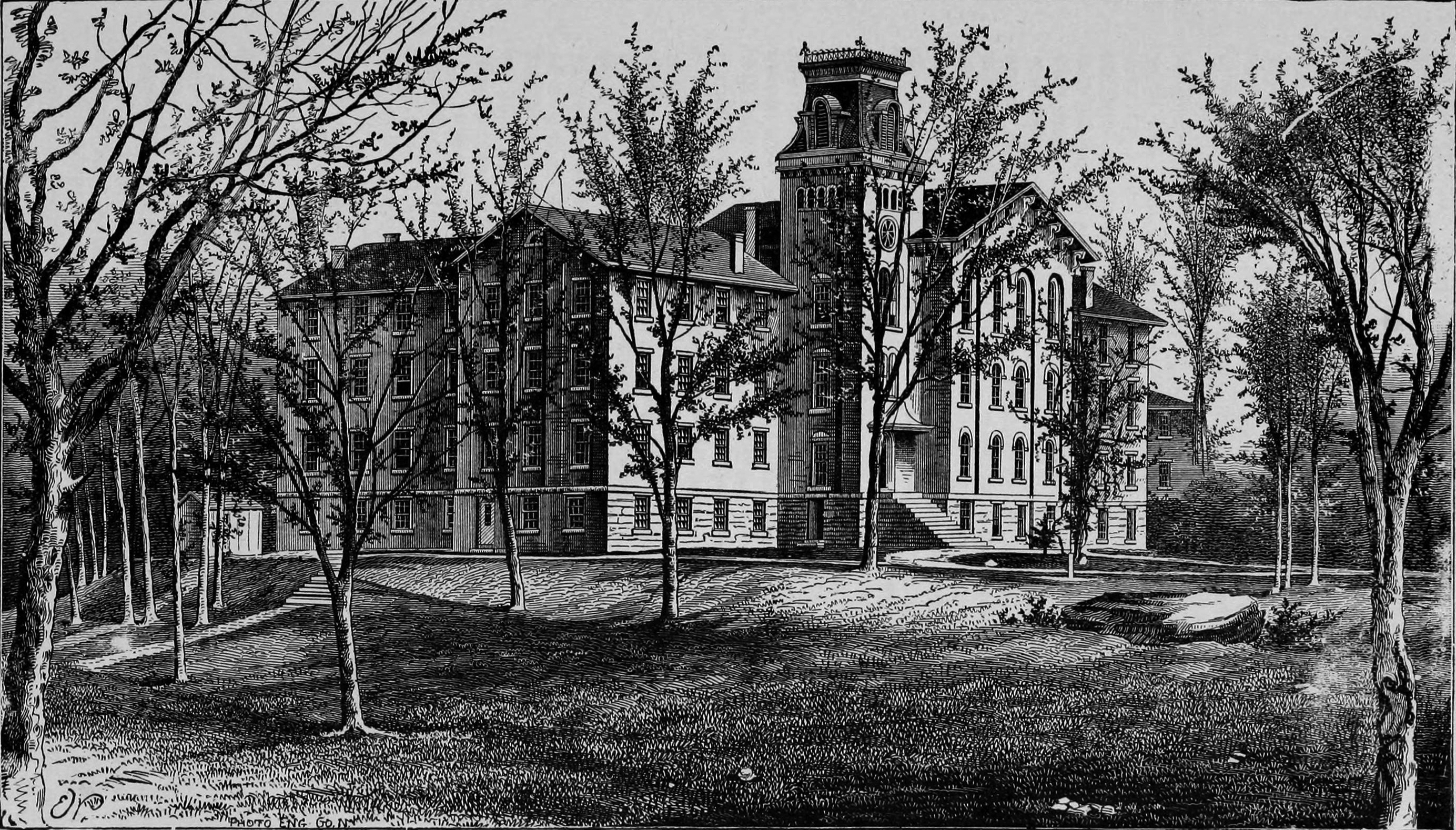
Monnett Hall, Original Section, Delaware Ohio. Monnett Hall was torn down in the late 1970s.

Mary Monnett Bain (Mary Monnett; September 21, 1833, in Marion County, Ohio – July 30, 1885, in Osawatomie, Miami County, Kansas), following her mother's death, came into a very large sum of money. She is known for the construction of Monnett Hall in 1856, a cutting edge, Midwestern 19th-century female college, built at a time when many Ohioans still lived in log cabins and most colleges did not accept women or did not provide boarding for them if they wanted to study away from home. The college (and Mary's building - a grand Second Empire styled Victorian building) was absorbed into Ohio Wesleyan University (OWU) after a few decades, but addition upon addition made the building grow to mammoth size. Monnett Hall provided the female dormitory space for all of OWUs women students for decades, until it was abandoned in the 1960s and torn down in the 1970s. Mary Monnett's donation of initial funding for the building provided generations of women with a kind of freedom she herself never enjoyed.

== Life ==
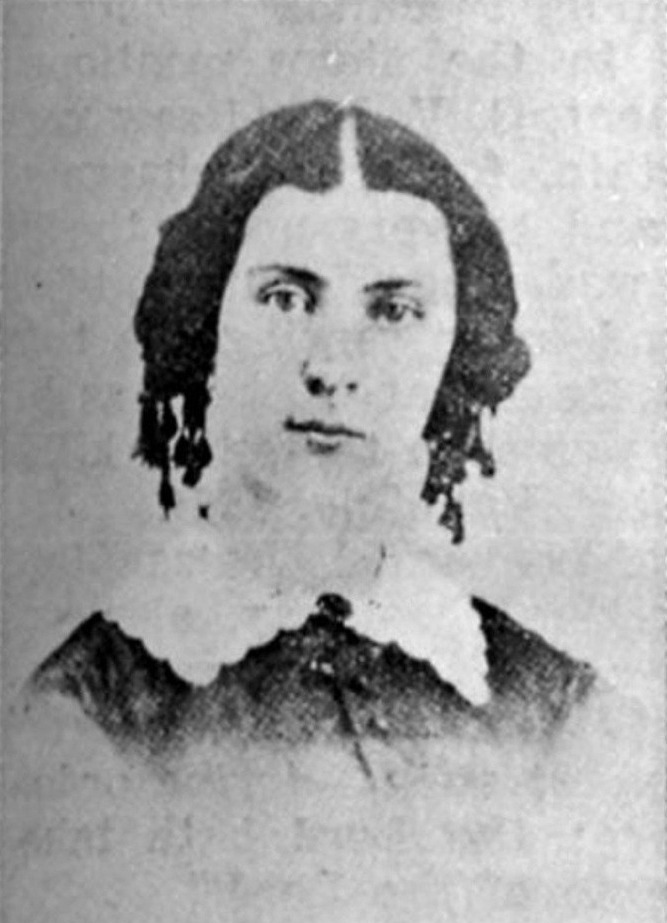
Portrait or Mary Monnett Bain

Monnett inherited a heart ailment which had made her family over-protect and shelter her. She was also the youngest daughter. As a result, she was not a good candidate for the kind of independence thrust upon her by her father's wealth after the death of her mother, just two years after the deaths of her other family members due to typhoid fever.

Mary and a young man named Charles Caldwell McCabe, a male seminarian attending Ohio Wesleyan University (also in Delaware, Ohio), had been courting since before the death of Mary's mother. He along with her mother's minister linked Mary to the life she had lived before the deaths of her father, two brothers, and sister, from typhoid fever, and then later, her mother. Mary's mother had loved Charlie and spoken of him on her deathbed.

Upon the death of her mother, since Mary could not live alone (19th century proper single females did not do this), she was taken into the home of her mother's minister, Bishop Leonard B. Gurley and his wife. Gurley was deeply involved with the Ohio Wesleyan Female College in Delaware, Ohio and the Methodist Church network in Ohio. Mary had already begun attending classes at the female school where her elder sister had attended. She continued her studies and continued her romance with Charlie McCabe.

But Rev. Gurley (it is believed that Gurley was the culprit) persuaded Mary that, with all her money, if she married the wildly talented Charlie McCabe, it would ruin McCabe's career, making him look like a gold digger. So without explanation, Mary ended her relationship with McCabe, who went on to become a nationally known figure much like Billy Graham. McCabe's highly acclaimed singing popularized the Battle Hymn of the Republic, which he was asked to sing at President Lincoln's funeral.

Meanwhile, Rev. Gurley then had total control of Mary, who probably viewed him as a father figure. Published religious poetry of Gurley's suggests that he believed strongly that when bad things happen to people, the people must be bad, and should repent. By this time Mary's life was a string of tragedies—the loss of her father-brother-sister-brother in one summer and finally the loss of her mother two years later. After Gurley persuaded her to sever ties with McCabe (who stopped eating, left school and moved to the other end of the state, probably because he was so distraught), Mary was emotionally flattened. But she had inherited $100,000.

The amount of $10,000 (ten percent, which might have been viewed as a tithe) was what Gurley induced her to donate to the Methodist effort toward creating its own female college. Her signature was forged (see book below, by Cynthia Rush, comparing signatures) on a key document related to the donation, but she honored her commitment to the school for as long as she controlled her own finances.

Gurley engineered a marriage between Monnett and a wealthy young man who sat on the board with him at the college, John William ("J.W.") Bain, a widower with two children, probably assuming that this marriage would give Gurley entrance to additional funds in the future. Instead, Bain took his wife and their budding family to New York where, on his money and hers, they enjoyed very high living for several years, only to return to Ohio to learn that the ministers who had promised to wisely invest Mary's wealth had lost nearly all of it. Bain had already shown his true attitude toward Gurley and the college when he complained bitterly to the college's board about the construction payments they expected from Mary. Now, he and Mary felt they had to leave Ohio so they would not have to be around Mary's quite wealthy relatives. Bain found work in Philadelphia selling typewriters while living near a mental institution, and Mary's mental health began to deteriorate.

Bain, a traveling salesman, died at a private residence. By this time Mary's mental health had deteriorated to the point that she could not manage her household or raise her children. Assisted by a cousin (who later wrote about it), Mary and the children moved west to Kansas, first living with her stepson. The children continued to live with their half-brother—Bain's child by his earlier marriage, and Mary was institutionalized in a state facility for the insane, where she died shortly after being discovered by the Reverend Charles McCabe who was attending to the residents of the asylum as a minister.

With the merger of the Ohio Wesleyan Female College into Ohio Wesleyan University, control of Monnett Hall was transferred to OWU where it remained active as a dormitory for women until 1968; Monnett Hall was razed in 1978. OWU continues to honor Mary Monnett Bain through the "Monnett Club" and "Monnett Weekend" held each spring on the campus in Delaware, Ohio. A plaque commemorates the space where Monnett Hall once stood, and a group of volunteers maintains a garden on the former building site.

Mary Monnett Bain's grandson, Monnett Bain Davis (1893-1953) served as the United States Ambassador to Panama 1948-51 and to Israel 1951-1953.

As a tribute for her generosity towards the Female Seminary and Ohio Wesleyan University, Mary Monnett Bain's formal portrait hangs in the main level of OWU's Frances E. Mowry Memorial Alumni Center.

== Sources ==
- Rush, Cynthia. Money Madness & Methodism: The Story of Mary Monnett, Innovations Resource Ltd. 2002.
- Monnette, Orra E. The Monnet Family Genealogy 1911. Reprinted through Higgenson Books, Salem Massachusetts.
- Monnett Bain Davis, Arlington Cemetery
