= James Grover McDonald =

American educator and diplomat

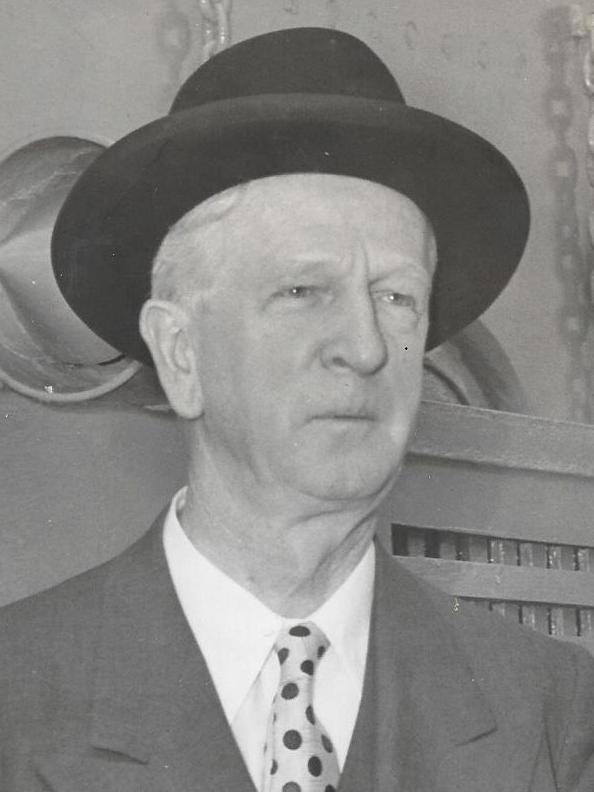
- McDonald in 1951

United States Ambassador to Israel
- In office March 28, 1949 – December 13, 1950
- President: Harry S. Truman
- Preceded by: Position established
- Succeeded by: Monnett Bain Davis

Personal details
- Born: November 29, 1886 Coldwater, Ohio, U.S.
- Died: September 25, 1964 (aged 77) White Plains, New York, U.S.
- Spouse: Ruth Stafford (m. 1915)
- Children: 2
- Education: Indiana University Bloomington; Harvard University; Tufts University

James Grover McDonald (November 29, 1886 – September 25, 1964) was an American diplomat who served as the first U.S. Ambassador to Israel from 1949 until 1950.

== Early life ==
McDonald was born in Coldwater, Ohio, on November 29, 1886. His parents operated a hotel, and later relocated to Albany, Indiana, to operate a second one.

McDonald received his bachelor's degree from Indiana University Bloomington (IU) in 1909, and completed a master's degree in history, Political Science and International Relations at IU in 1910. He was selected for a teaching fellowship in history at Harvard University, and remained there until his returning to Indiana University as an assistant professor in 1914.

While living in Albany McDonald met Ruth Stafford, and they married in 1915. They had two children, daughters Barbara Ann and Janet. McDonald's nephew was University of Connecticut library director John P. McDonald.

McDonald taught at IU until 1918, including a break in 1915 and 1916 to study in Spain as a Harvard University traveling fellow. He also taught summer sessions at the University of Georgia in 1916 and 1917.

In 1919 McDonald moved to New York City to work for the Civil Service Reform Association.

== Later career ==
- Chairman of the Board, Foreign Policy Association (1919–1933)
- League of Nations High Commissioner for Refugees Coming from Germany (1933–1935)
- Member, Editorial Staff, The New York Times (1936–1938)
- President of the "President Roosevelt Consultative Committee for Political Refugees"
- Member, U.S. Delegation at the Evian Conference (1938)
- President, Brooklyn Institute of Arts and Sciences (1938–1942)
- Chairman, President's Advisory Committee on Political Refugees (1938–1945)
- News Analyst, National Broadcasting Company, Blue Network (1942–1944)
- Member, Anglo-American Committee of Inquiry 1946
- United States Special Representative to Israel (1948–1949)
- United States Ambassador to Israel (1949–1951)
- Chairman, Advisory Council, Development Corporation for Israel (1951–1961)

== High Commissioner for Refugees Coming from Germany ==
In 1933 McDonald was assigned to chair the High Commission for Refugees (Jewish and Others) Coming from Germany. This body was proposed in October 1933. According to the proposal the High Commission would be an entirely autonomous organization in charge of finding its own funding as it would receive no financial support from the League of Nations, with which it was affiliated. The commission did not report to the League of Nations but rather only to the commission's Governing Body. The resolution for this commission was passed on October 12, 1933.

During his time as High Commissioner McDonald sought out numerous avenues for support in his efforts to rescue the suffering German Jews. He made many appeals to organizations, such as the United States government and the Vatican, for support - but ultimately found himself isolated. Promises of financial aid were made, as was the case with a ten-thousand-dollar donation from the U.S. Congress promised by President Roosevelt, but only few of them were kept. During his tenure, McDonald became a Zionist, partially as a result of his close ties with Chaim Weizmann and his deputy director Norman Bentwich. McDonald met with the Central British Fund for German Jewry (now World Jewish Relief) frequently to discuss emigration proposals for German Jews.

Ultimately, McDonald became frustrated with the lack of support and compassion he encountered during his time as High Commissioner for Refugees (Jewish and Others). After being unable to find new homes for numerous displaced Jewish refugees, McDonald resigned his post on December 27, 1935.

== Ambassador to Israel ==
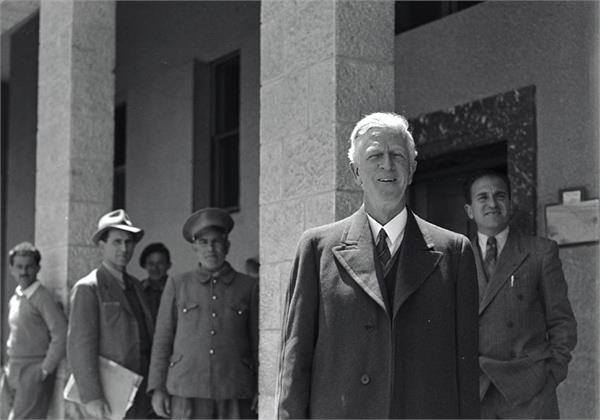
McDonald in Jerusalem, 1947

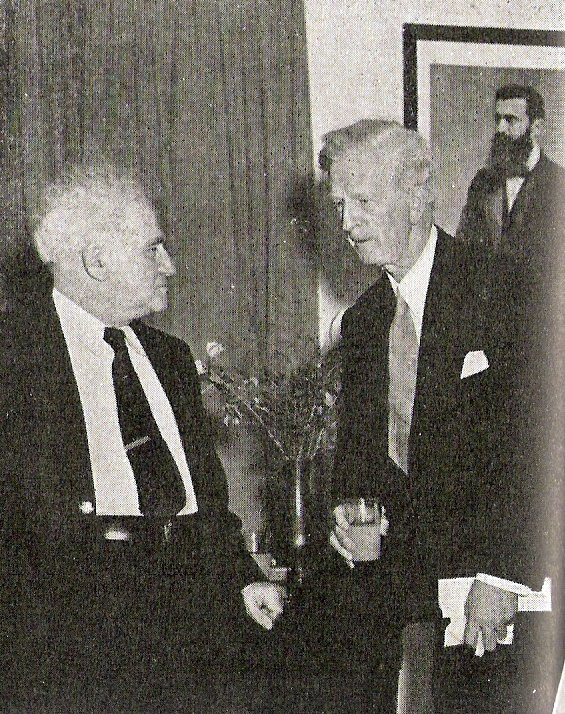
McDonald (right), as the Special Representative of the United States to Israel, meets with Israeli Prime Minister David Ben-Gurion, 1948

McDonald was a member of the Anglo-American Committee of Inquiry on Palestine set up 10 December 1945 to examine the possibilities for mass settlement of European Jews in Palestine. Its final report 30 April 1946, called for the immediate admission into Palestine of 100,000 Jewish Displaced Persons.

On 23 July 1948, he was appointed the Special Representative of the United States to Israel. His appointment was a personal choice by President Truman. It was opposed by Secretary of Defense James Forrestal and resented by Secretary of State George Marshall. He was not a professional diplomat and had a difficult relationship with the State Department staff whom he referred to as "technicians".

On his way to take up his appointment, he had a meeting in London with Foreign Secretary Bevin—"I had to tell myself that this was not Hitler seated before me" — at which he provoked Bevin into losing his temper by suggesting that Britain should send a diplomatic representative to Tel Aviv. He arrived in Haifa 12 August 1948. During his first months in the country there were serious concerns for his security. Three months previously Thomas C. Wasson, the U.S. Consul in Jerusalem, had been assassinated in West Jerusalem. On 22 August the Chief Code Clerk at the U.S. Consulate in Jerusalem was kidnapped by the Stern Gang and held for almost 24 hours. Fears were increased following the killing of Folke Bernadotte in September.

He was critical of the Provisional Government's refusal to allow any Arab refugees to return to their homes. He argued that this would cause lasting bitterness, but he persistently lobbied the State Department, as well as President Truman personally, for diplomatic recognition. On 24 August 1948, he telegrammed Truman: "I have reached the conclusion that the Jewish emphasis on peace negotiations is sounder than the present U.S. and UN emphasis on truce and demilitarization [of Jerusalem] and refugees." In September he argued that delay in the recognition "only encourages Jews in their aggressive attitude." During the election campaign for the first Knesset, December 1948, he repeatedly warned his superiors of the threat of the Soviet Union trying to influence the result. On 25 January 1949, just before election day, he succeeded in getting a U.S.–Israel Export-Import Bank Loan approved.

At the start of the Armistice negotiations, January 1949, McDonald sent the State Department a four-page assessment of Israel's military capacity in which he stated that current Israeli strength was "... 30,000 at present, with an additional 30,000 over-age auxiliaries (including women) who are called up intermittently.... The rumored figure of an 'Israeli Defense Army' of 80,000 fighting men is, in the opinion of the Counselor [himself] an exaggeration." This compares with an assessment made three months later by his own Military Attache for Army Intelligence that, after a 10% demobilization, Israel had a standing army of between 95,000 and 100,000 with some 20,000 to 30,000 reserves.

In early February 1949, his position was upgraded to full Ambassador.

He strongly opposed the U.S. Government's refusal to recognise Israel's occupation of Jerusalem. His request to the State Department for permission to attend the opening session of the first Knesset in Jerusalem was turned down. He used his position to avoid any highlighting of this policy. On 29 July 1950, he broke the ban on conducting official business in the city when he held a meeting with David Ben-Gurion to discuss the outbreak of the Korean War.

He protested to the State Department when, in June 1949, President Truman criticised Israel and threatened sanctions following announcements that Israel might annex the Gaza Strip. In November 1948 he lobbied the State Department in favour of Israel's membership of the United Nations. He was also active in getting Menachem Begin a visitor's visa to enter the U.S. reversing the ban on members of terror organisations entering the country.

He campaigned for a U.S. loan for the upgrading of Haifa harbour and was involved in the first formal commercial agreement between the two countries — the 1950 Israel–US air treaty.

He held two meetings with Pope Pius XII at which he argued for Papal recognition of Israel which was being withheld.

Following the publication of his book, My Mission in Israel 1948–1951, a complimentary copy was sent to every Rabbi in the United States.

Back in the U.S., he added his name to the list of Zionist groups, 23 October 1953, which issued a statement condemning the threat to cut off aid during the crisis over diverting water from the Jordan River.

== Diary ==
James Grover McDonald was the first U.S. ambassador to Israel, but he was much more than that. He kept a diary which recorded his meetings with some of the history-making personalities of the 1930s, and his activities on behalf of the Jews back in the 1930s when no one would listen.

His diary, which was never intended for publication, was dictated to his secretary at the end of each day, as he considered himself a better speaker than a writer. In a number of key diplomatic posts, he had access to the highest levels of government in Europe and the United States. His diaries, which began in 1922, record events up to 1936. In his capacity as the League of Nations high commissioner for refugees from 1933 to 1935, he saw firsthand what the Nazis were plotting, and believed - long before many German Jews had internalized the threat - that Hitler would destroy European Jewry.

He was born in Coldwater, Ohio, in 1886, and as his mother was German he spoke the language fluently. He studied at Harvard and became friendly with visiting German students, who later became prominent Nazis. In his work as chairman of the Foreign Policy Association, a job he held from 1919 to 1933, he regularly visited Germany. The Nazi officials, charmed by his fluent German and aquiline features, spoke openly about their plans for the Jews. On April 4, 1933, he records his meeting with two Nazi officials: "I looked forward to an informing analysis of the Nazi economic program. Instead, after we discussed it for 10 or 15 minutes, both Daitz and Ludecke drifted back to the subject of the Jews, which seems to be an obsession with so many of the Nazis.... The casual expressions used by both men in speaking of the Jews were such as to make one cringe, because one would not speak so of even a most degenerate people.

"When I indicated my disbelief in their racial theories, they said what other Nazis had said: 'But surely you, a perfect type of Aryan, could not be unsympathetic to our views'.... I had the impression that they really do set unbelievable store by such physical characteristics as long heads and light hair."

So convinced was he that the Jews were marked for destruction in Germany that he appealed to the international community to help settle them outside the Reich - but had very little success. As Deborah Lipstadt wrote in her review of the diaries, now published as a book, Advocate for the Doomed, "McDonald, unlike many of his contemporaries, tried to make a difference in what would become a unique story of doom and destruction." In December 1935, he resigned in protest at the lack of support for his work. Later, he played a role in the creation of Israel acting as an intermediary between the Truman administration and its founding fathers.

Today, all his private diaries are in the United States Holocaust Memorial Museum. In May 2003, the museum's library director received a letter from the daughter of the man who was going to write McDonald's biography, saying her father had died prematurely and she possessed about 500 pages of the diaries. She delivered the writings to the museum and the archivist realized immediately that not only was the collection of huge historical importance but that they represented only a fraction of his total writings.

Carrying out painstaking investigations, he discovered that the rest of the material was held by McDonald's daughter, Barbara McDonald Stewart, also a historian. She agreed to donate the 10,000 typed pages of diary entries to the museum and agreed to co-edit them for publication. The first volume, covering the years 1932–1935, Advocate for the Doomed appeared in 2007. The second volume, encompassing 1935–1945, Refugees and Rescue was published in 2009. The third volume, covering 1945–1947, To the Gates of Jerusalem appeared in 2014. The final volume of his diary entries, addressing 1948–1951, Envoy to the Promised Land, was published in June, 2017.

After he retired as ambassador to Israel, McDonald — who had been on conversational terms with Hitler, Roosevelt, Cardinal Pacelli (the future Pius XII) and Chaim Weizmann — continued as a passionate Zionist and helped to sell Israel Bonds until his death in 1964.

In honor and respect for McDonald, a street in Netanya, Israel was named for him, Rehov McDonald.

== McDonald's Credo ==
1951–52, James McDonald wrote "A Credo," a succinct explanation of his motivation for doing what he did. He reflects his motivations as being fundamentally rooted in Christian and American values.

He stated that the threat of Jewish extermination in Germany represented a broader threat to religious freedom and democratic principles. He viewed the persecution of Jews as a significant global issue affecting universal rights to freedom and equality regardless of race, religion, or nationality. Consequently, despite his self-described Scottish-Canadian and American background and his background as a teacher, he chose to advocate for Jewish rights and equal human rights.

...It was an irresistible call.”

== Death and burial ==
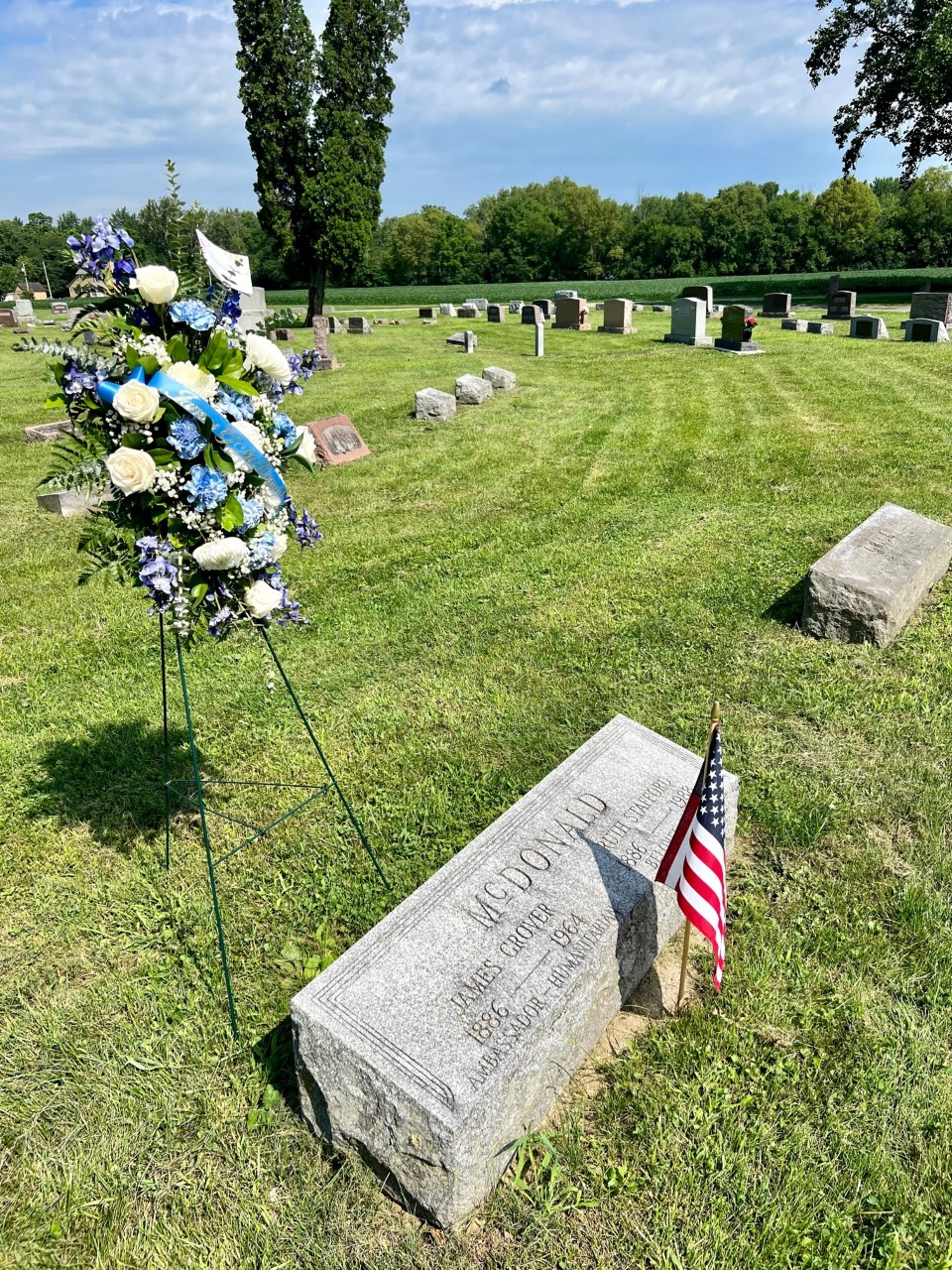
Gravesite of James G. McDonald and his wife

In retirement McDonald resided in Bronxville, New York. He died at the hospital in White Plains, New York on September 25, 1964. His funeral was held in the Reformed Church and he was buried at Strong Cemetery in Albany, Indiana.

== Historical marker ==
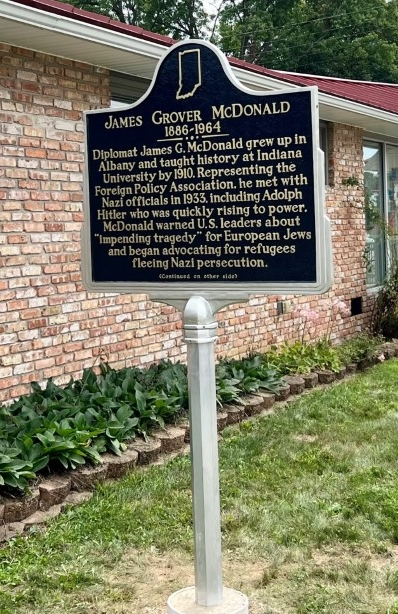
James Grover McDonald historical marker side 1

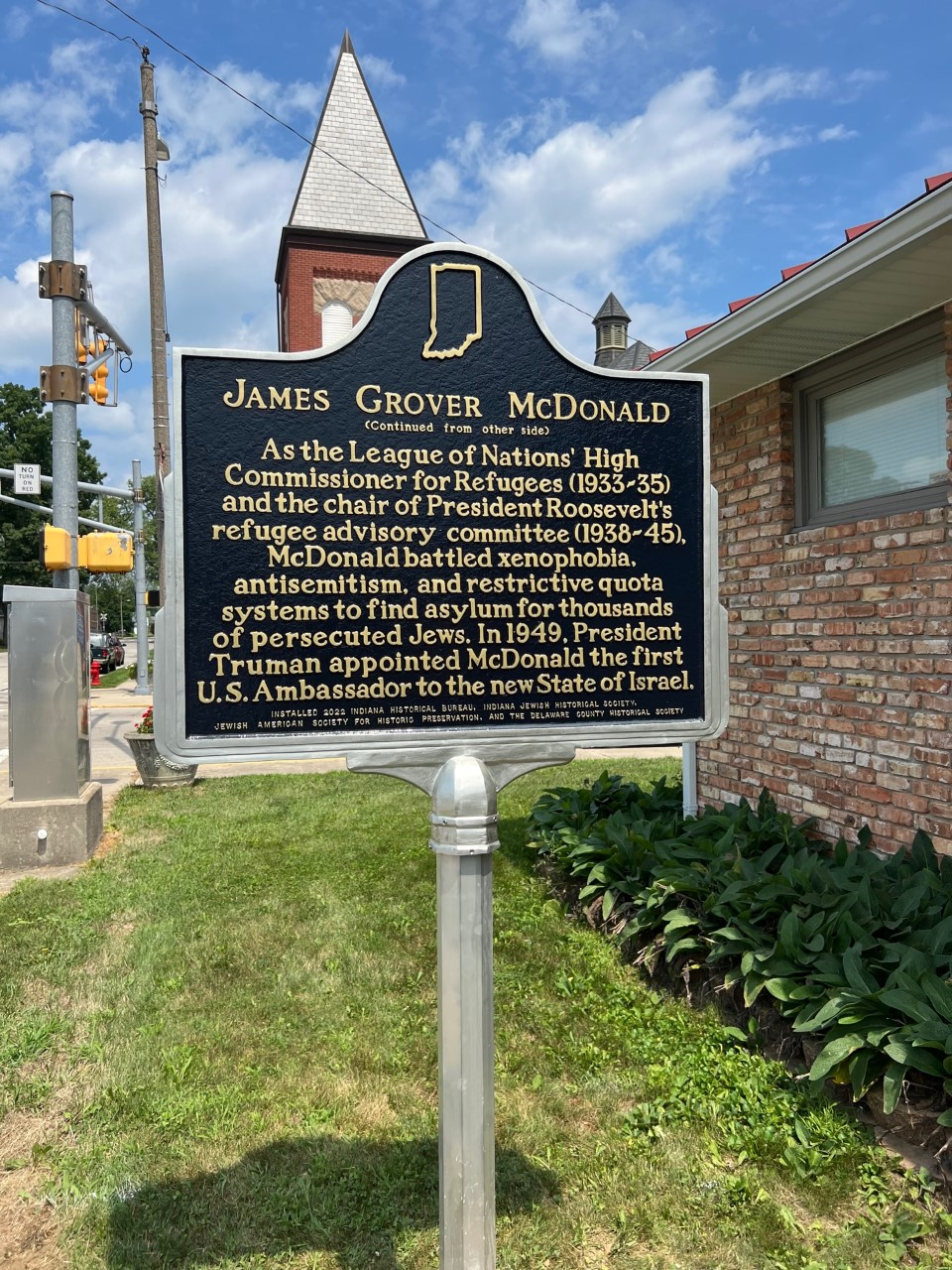
James Grover McDonald marker side 2

On August 11, 2022, a historical interpretive double-sided marker was placed at 105 Broadway, Albany, Indiana, honoring the life and legacy of James G. McDonald. The historical marker was funded by the Jewish American Society for Historic Preservation. The marker was a joint collaborative effort by the citizens of Albany, the Indiana Jewish Historical Society, the Indiana Historical Bureau, and the Delaware County Historical Society.

Text

James Grover McDonald 1886-1964

Diplomat James G. McDonald grew up in Albany and taught history at Indiana University by 1910. Representing the Foreign Policy Association, he met with Nazi officials in 1933, including Adolf Hitler who was quickly rising to power. McDonald warned U.S. leaders about “Impending tragedy” for European Jews and began advocating for refugees fleeing Nazi persecution.

(Side 2)

James Grover McDonald (Continued from other side)

As the League of Nations’ High Commissioner for Refugees (1933-35) and the chair of President Roosevelt’s refugee advisory committee (1938-45), McDonald battled xenophobia, antisemitism, and restrictive quota systems to find asylum for thousands of persecuted Jews. In 1949, President Truman appointed McDonald the first U.S. Ambassador to the new State of Israel.

Installed 2022 Indiana Historical Bureau, Indiana Jewish Historical Society, Jewish American Society for Historic Preservation and the Delaware County Historical Society

Diplomatic posts
Preceded by -	U.S. Ambassador to Israel; 1949–1950	Succeeded by Monnett Bain Davis
