= Sara Jane Crafts =

American social reformer, author, lecturer and teacher

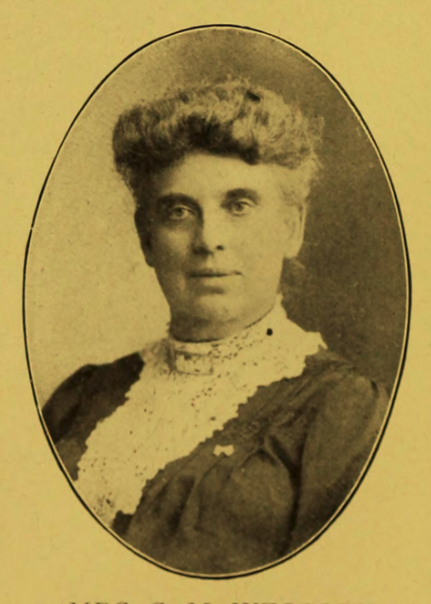
- Born: Sara Jane Timanus; August 15, 1845; Cincinnati, Ohio, U.S.
- Died: May 2, 1930 (aged 84); Washington, D.C.
- Resting place: Westerly, Rhode Island, U.S.
- Education: Ohio Wesleyan Female College; Iowa University, Grinnell
- Occupations: social reformer; author; lecturer; teacher
- Spouse: Wilbur Fisk Crafts (m. 1874–1922)
- Writing career
- Pen name: Mrs. Wilbur F. Crafts
- Genres: early childhood education; temperance; Esperanto

Signature
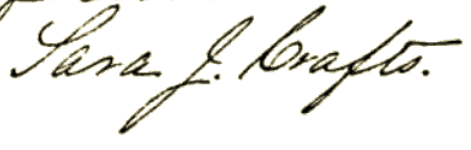

Sara Jane Crafts (née, Timanus; pen name, Mrs. Wilbur F. Crafts; August 15, 1845 – May 2, 1930) was an American social reformer, author, lecturer, and teacher. She lectured and taught at Chautauquas, as well as a lecturer at State and International Sunday school conventions. Crafts was an editor and contributor to various periodicals, and published several books between 1876 and 1911. Craft was a social reformer who traveled the world advocating on behalf of Sunday schools, temperance, and anti-opium. She was also "one of the first women to conduct convention sessions" in the U.S.

== Early life and education ==
Sara Jane Timanus was born in Cincinnati, Ohio, August 15, 1845. Sara had two younger siblings, John and Fannie. Her parents were Jesse and Jane (Means) Timanus.

She was educated in the public schools of Cincinnati, at Ohio Wesleyan Female College, and at Iowa University, Grinnell.

== Career ==
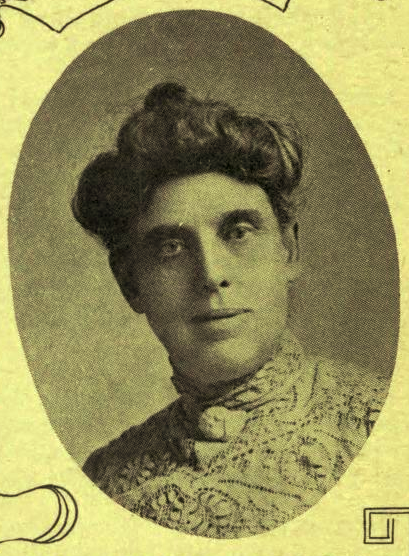
(1907)

Intoxicants & opium

Intoxicating drinks

World book of temperance

Around 1865 till 1870, taught in public schools. From 1870 through 1874, she was a teacher in the Minnesota State Normal School.

On May 1, 1874, in Plainfield, New Jersey, she married Rev. Wilbur Fisk Crafts (1850–1922).

After marriage, she worked with her husband on Sunday school Union work and the production of social reform literature. She was an instructor in various Sunday school normal institutes, State conventions, and Chautauqua assemblies. In 1895, she was made superintendent of the Sunday school Department of the World’s Woman's Christian Temperance Union (WCTU). She was an organizer and honorary president of the International Primary Union of Sunday school teachers.

Between 1880 and 1913, she traveled extensively in Europe and the Orient in the interest of temperance, anti-opium, and reform movements. In 1904, she was in the Orient and Palestine. Three years later, she was in Australia, China, Japan, and Korea. In 1910, she was in Norway and Sweden. She organized Sunday schools in Iceland in 1913. Her travels also included Holland, Switzerland, and Italy.

In 1895, Crafts founded and served as superintendent of the International Reform Bureau. Beginning in 1896, she was the editor-in-chief of the 20th-Century Quarterly. From 1901 till 1903, she was also the editor-in-chief of the Christian Statesman, the official organ of the National Reform Association, which was a monthly journal devoted to the maintenance of Christian principles of civil government. For a number of years, she wrote the temperance lessons for the National Temperance Society and Publishing House, the Christian Herald, and other religious and temperance papers. She also served as editor of the Christian Herald Esperanto Column.

Craft was the author of: Childhood, The Text Book of the Age; Open Letters for Primary Teachers; Primary Normal Outlines; The Infant Class (with Edward Eggleston); Songs for Little Folks and Little Pilgrim Songs (with Jenny B. Merrill); Plain Uses of the Blackboard (with W. F. Crafts), 1881; Course in Esperanto; Intoxicants and Opium (with W. F. Crafts); and World Book of Temperance (with W. F. Crafts), 1908.

Crafts served as vice-president of the Woman's Esperanto League of North America. She was also a member of the National Geographic Society, British Esperanto Association, and the Archaeological Institute of America.

== Personal life ==
Crafts favored women's suffrage. In religion, she was Presbyterian.

The Crafts removed to Washington, D.C. in 1896. She died there at Garfield Memorial Hospital, May 2, 1930. Burial was in Westerly, Rhode Island.

== Selected works ==
- Open Letters to Primary Teachers: With Hints for Intermediate Class Teachers, 1876 (Text)
- Primary Normal Outlines
- Course in Esperanto

=== With W. F. Crafts ===
- Childhood, The Text Book of the Age, 1874 (Text)
- Plain Uses of the Blackboard, 1881
- Intoxicants and Opium, 1900 (Text)
- Intoxicants & opium in all lands and times, a twentieth century survey of intemperance, based on a symposium of testimony from one hundred missionaries and travelers, 1904
- World Book of Temperance, 1908 (Text)
- Intoxicating drinks and, drugs in all lands and times, a twentieth century survey of temperance, based on a symposium of testimony from one hundred missionaries and travelers, 1911

=== With Edward Eggleston ===
- The Infant Class: Hints on Primary Religious Instruction., 1870

=== With Jenny B. Merrill ===
- Songs for Little Folks and Little Pilgrim Songs
