= Jenny B. Merrill =

American early childhood educator and author

- Born: Jane Beggs Merrill; September 4, 1854; New York City, New York, U.S.
- Died: February 19, 1934 (aged 79); New York City
- Education: New York University
- Occupations: educator; author
- Writing career
- Subject: early childhood education

Jenny B. Merrill (September 4, 1854 – February 19, 1934) was an American early childhood educator and author from New York (state). She graduated from Normal College in 1871 and later earned a Doctorate in Pedagogy from New York University (NYU). Merrill held several leadership positions in early childhood education, including Supervisor of Public Kindergartens of New York City, President of the Kindergarten Department of the National Education Association (NEA), and Honorary President of the Public School Kindergarten Association of New York City. She was also the author of the first articles published in the United States about Montessori education. Merrill wrote extensively on religious instruction and early childhood education, publishing numerous works between the 1870s and 1890s.

== Biography ==
Jane Beggs Merrill was born in New York City, September 4, 1854. Her parents were Benjamin B. and Jane Anne McBride Merrill.

In 1871, she graduated from Normal College (now Hunter College), and in 1892, she received a Doctorate in Pedagogy from NYU.

Merrill served as the Supervisor of Public Kindergartens of New York City; President of the Kindergarten Department of the NEA; and Honorary President of the Public School Kindergarten Association of New York City.

Jenny B. Merrill died of pneumonia in New York City, February 19, 1934.

== Selected works ==
- Songs for Little Folks: A Collection Adapted for the Home Circle and the Primary Classes in Sunday and Day Schools (1875; with Mrs. Wilbur F. Crafts)
- Pictures and Stories for Our Darlings (1879)
- Little Folks Bible Gallery (1880)
- Bible Pictures and Stories for Little Folks (1881)
- Shield and Buckler (1886)
- The Children's Bible Hour (1888)
- Bible Talks about Bible Pictures (1889)
- A Psychological Study: From a Letter Written in Reply to a Friend's Questions Regarding the Development of a Child's Early Idea of Number (1891)
- Outline Course for Vacation Kindergartens (1899)
