= List of ambassadors of the United States to Israel =

Ambassador of the United States to the State of Israel שַׁגְרִיר אַרְצוֹת הַבְּרִית לְיִשְׂרָאֵל سفير الولايات المتحدة لدى إسرائيل
- Seal of the United States Department of State

- Flag of a United States ambassador

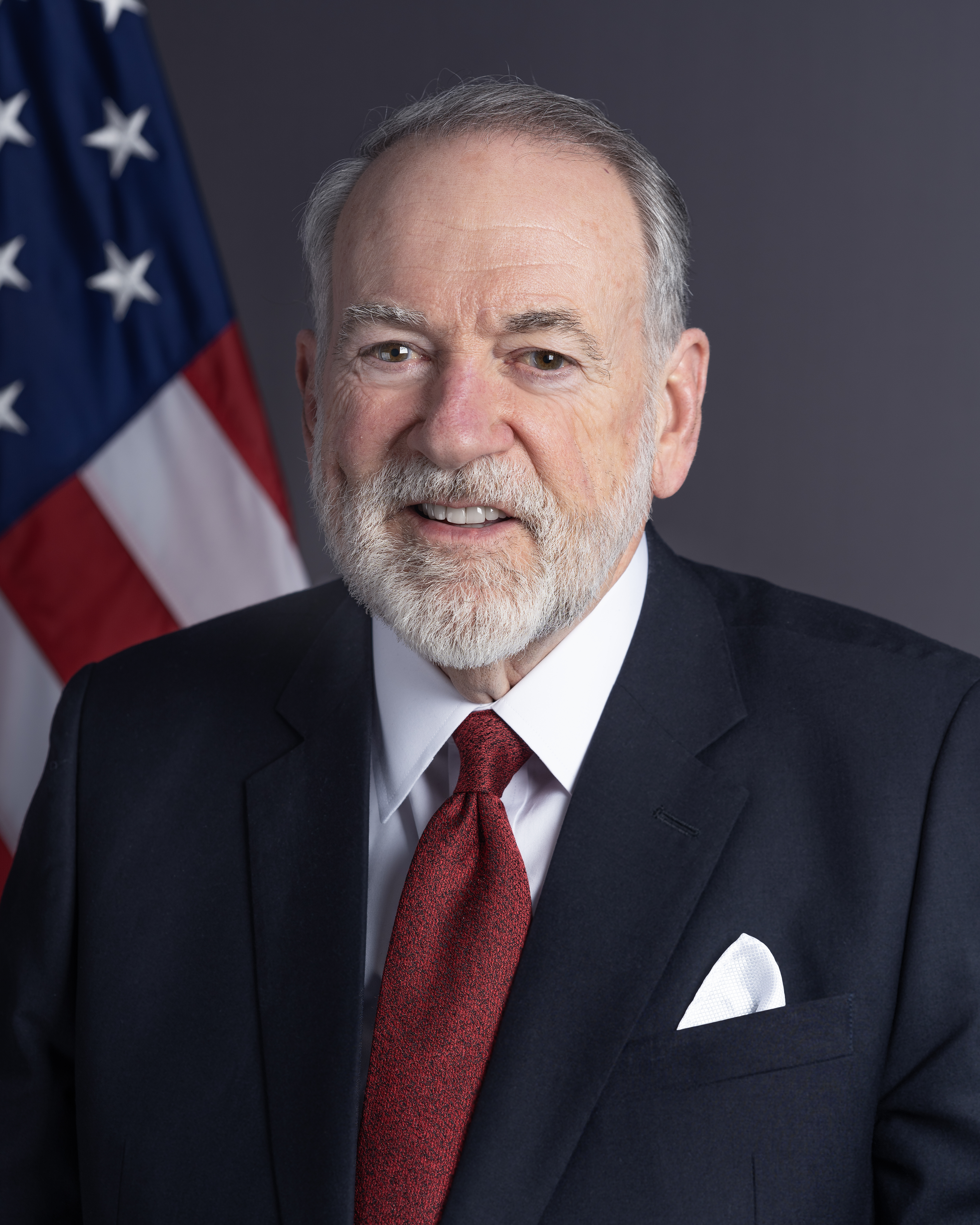
- Incumbent; Mike Huckabee since April 21, 2025
- Style: His or Her Excellency (formal); Mr. or Madam Ambassador (informal)
- Reports to: United States Secretary of State
- Seat: Embassy of the United States, Jerusalem, Israel
- Appointer: President of the United States; with the advice and consent of the Senate
- Term length: At the pleasure of the president
- Inaugural holder: James Grover McDonald as Ambassador
- Formation: March 28, 1949
- Website: U.S. Embassy - Jerusalem

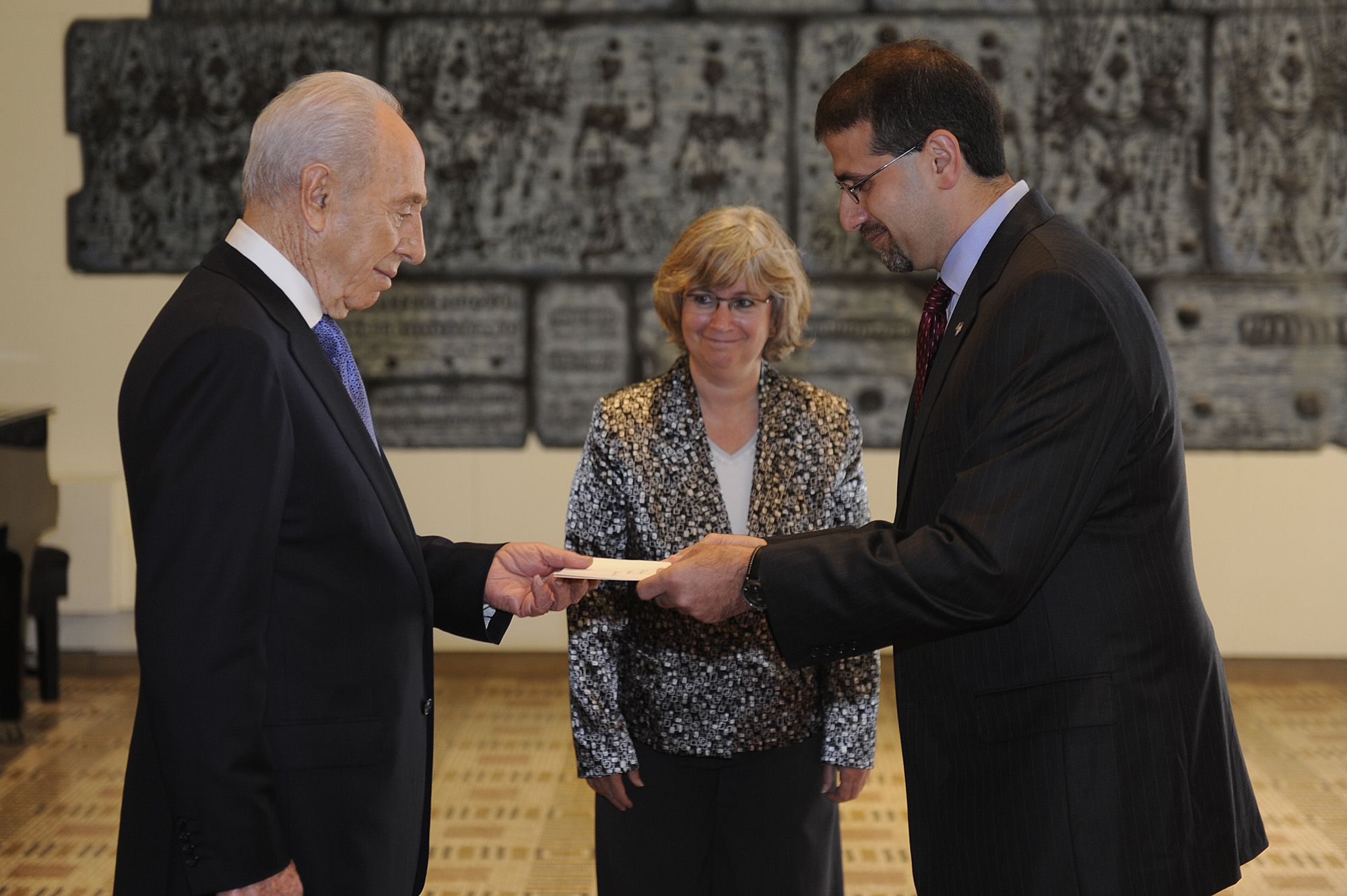
Ambassador Daniel B. Shapiro presents his credentials to President Shimon Peres, August 3, 2011. In the background, Israeli volcanic ash art.

The United States ambassador to Israel is the official representative of the president of the United States to the head of state of Israel.

Until 1948, the area that is now the state of Israel had been under British administration as part of the League of Nations/United Nations' Mandate for Palestine. On May 14, 1948, the British government unilaterally terminated the mandate. On the same day, the Jewish Agency, under future Prime Minister David Ben-Gurion, declared independence and named the country Israel. The United States immediately recognized the nation and moved to establish diplomatic relations. The first U.S. ambassador commissioned to Israel was James Grover McDonald, who presented his credentials to the government of Israel on March 28, 1949. The ambassador holds the title Ambassador Extraordinary and Plenipotentiary.

The embassy of the United States in Israel is located at 14 David Flusser Street in Jerusalem.

== Ambassadors and chiefs of mission ==
Image	Name	Appointed	Presented credentials	Terminated mission
	James Grover McDonald – Political appointee	March 18, 1949	March 28, 1949	December 13, 1950
	Monnett Bain Davis – Career FSO	February 1, 1951	February 26, 1951	Died at post December 26, 1953
	Edward B. Lawson – Career FSO	April 9, 1954	November 12, 1954	February 17, 1959
	Ogden Rogers Reid – Political Appointee	June 5, 1959	July 2, 1959	Left Israel January 19, 1961
	Walworth Barbour – Career FSO	May 11, 1961	June 12, 1961	January 19, 1973
	Kenneth B. Keating – Political appointee	June 22, 1973	August 28, 1973	Died in New York May 5, 1975
	Malcolm Toon – Career FSO	June 9, 1975	July 10, 1975	December 27, 1976
	Samuel W. Lewis – Career FSO	April 26, 1977	May 25, 1977	May 31, 1985
	Thomas R. Pickering – Career FSO	July 12, 1985	August 6, 1985	December 28, 1988
	William Andreas Brown – Career FSO	November 22, 1988	December 29, 1988	January 7, 1992
	William Caldwell Harrop – Career FSO	November 21, 1991	January 21, 1992	May 7, 1993
	Edward Djerejian – Career FSO	November 22, 1993	January 13, 1994	August 9, 1994
	Martin Indyk – Political appointee	March 4, 1995	April 10, 1995	September 27, 1997
	Edward S. Walker, Jr. – Career FSO	November 10, 1997	December 24, 1997	January 23, 2000
	Martin Indyk – Political appointee	November 16, 1999	January 25, 2000	July 13, 2001
	Daniel C. Kurtzer – Career FSO	July 12, 2001	July 18, 2001	July 17, 2005
	Richard Henry Jones – Career FSO	August 2, 2005	September 26, 2005	April 27, 2008
	James B. Cunningham – Career FSO	June 30, 2008	September 17, 2008	May 21, 2011
	Daniel B. Shapiro – Political appointee	July 8, 2011	August 3, 2011	January 20, 2017
	David M. Friedman – Political appointee	March 23, 2017	May 15, 2017	January 20, 2021
	Thomas R. Nides – Political appointee	November 3, 2021	December 5, 2021	July 21, 2023
	Jack Lew – Political appointee	October 31, 2023	November 5, 2023	January 20, 2025
	Mike Huckabee – Political appointee	April 9, 2025	April 21, 2025	

List source:

== See also ==
- List of ambassadors of Israel to the United States
- Embassy of the United States, Jerusalem
- Israel - United States relations
- Foreign relations of Israel
- Ambassadors of the United States
