= Edward B. Lawson =

American diplomat

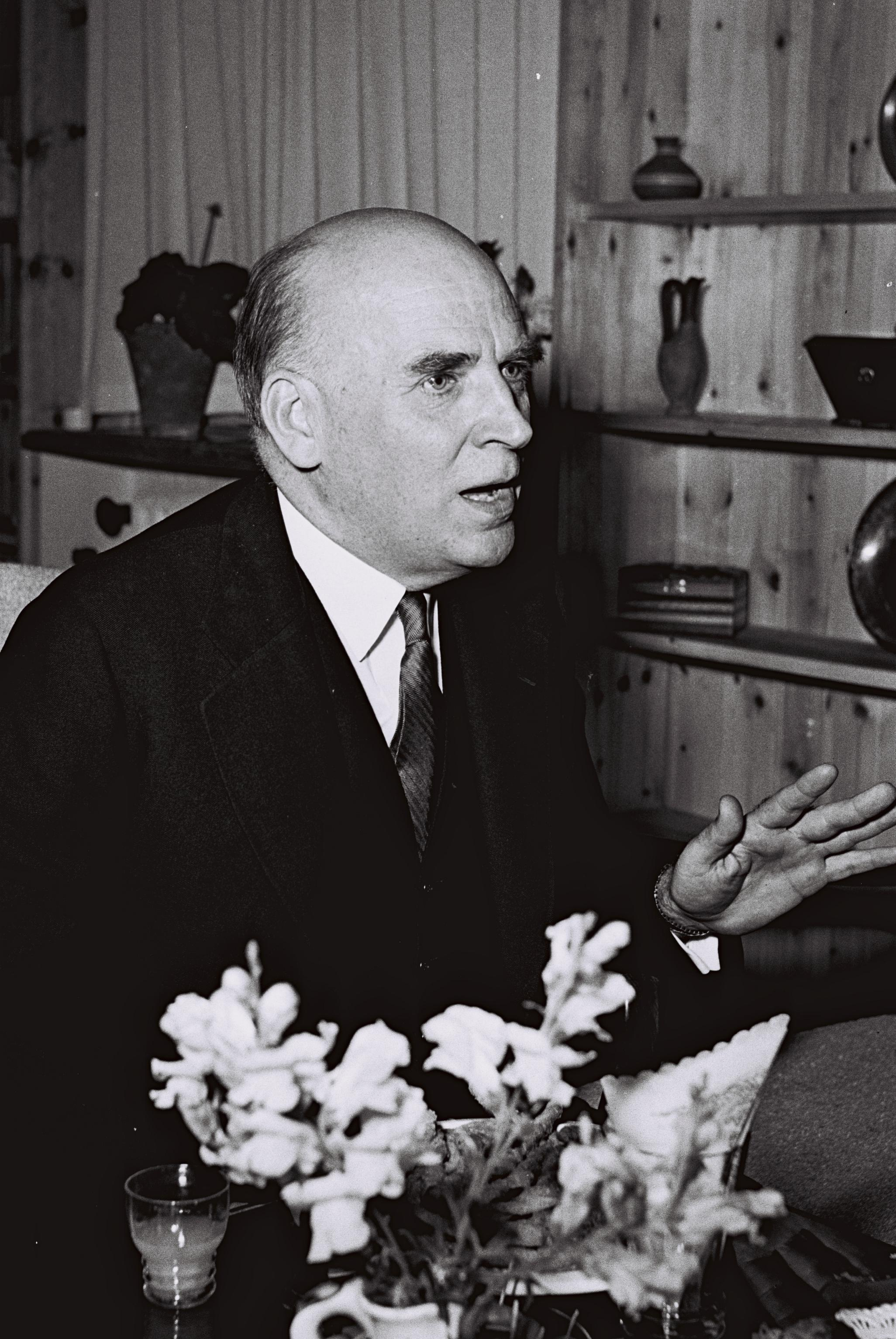

United States Ambassador to Iceland
- In office September 22, 1949 – May 29, 1954
- Preceded by: Richard P. Butrick
- Succeeded by: John J. Muccio

United States Ambassador to Israel
- In office November 12, 1954 – February 17, 1959
- Preceded by: Monnett Bain Davis
- Succeeded by: Ogden Rogers Reid

Personal details
- Born: Edward Burnett Lawson; September 26, 1895 Newport, Tennessee, U.S.
- Died: November 19, 1962 (aged 67) Washington, D.C., U.S.
- Spouse: Jean McDonald Lawson
- Relatives: Hamilton S. Burnett
- Education: Georgetown University (BS; MS)

Military service
- Branch/service: United States Army
- Years of service: 1918–19

Edward Burnett Lawson (September 26, 1895 – November 19, 1962) was an American diplomat who served as the United States ambassador to Iceland from 1949 to 1954, and Israel from 1954 to 1959.

== Early life ==
Edward Burnett Lawson was born in Newport, Tennessee, on September 26, 1895, to David Farnsworth Lawson and Laura Burnett. His family moved to Washington, D.C. in 1910.

Lawson attended Georgetown University from 1914 to 1917, but he left to fight in World War I. He returned and graduated with Bachelor of Science and Master of Science degrees in 1924 and 1925.

== Career ==
Lawson worked at the United States Department of Commerce as a business specialist from 1926 to 1927. He joined the United States Foreign Service and was assigned to Johannesburg, in 1930. From 1944 to 1948, Lawson was a counselor for economic affairs at the American embassy in Turkey.

Lawson was appointed as ambassador to Iceland on July 22, 1949, and presented his credentials on September 22. He left the position on May 29, 1954.

Lawson was appointed as ambassador to Israel on April 9, 1954, and on November 12 he presented his credentials to Prime Minister David Ben-Gurion in Jerusalem. Arab League representatives protested Lawson presenting his credentials in Jerusalem, but Secretary of State John Foster Dulles stated that diplomats only presented their credentials where the chief of state was and that the American embassy was still located in Tel Aviv. Lawson left the position on February 17, 1959.

== Personal life ==
Lawson married Jean. He was related to Hamilton S. Burnett, an associate justice of the Tennessee Supreme Court, through his mother.

Lawson died from a heart attack at his home in Washington, D.C. on November 19, 1962.

== Works cited ==
=== Journals ===
- Dawidowicz, Lucy (1956). "The United States and The State of Israel". American Jewish Year Book. 57. American Jewish Committee: 276–289. doi:10.2307/23604939. JSTOR 23604939.

=== News ===
- "Edward B. Lawson Dies at 67; Ambassador to Israel, 1954-59". The New York Times. November 20, 1962. Archived from the original on July 23, 2018.
- "Edward B. Lawson, Diplomat, Worked on Truce in Israel". The Washington Star. November 19, 1962. p. B5 – via Newspapers.com.
- Sweeten, Tom (April 5, 1954). "Lawson's Road To Israel Began In Cocke County 44 Years Ago". The Knoxville Journal. p. 16 – via Newspapers.com.

=== Web ===
- "Edward Burnett Lawson (1895–1962)". United States Department of State. Archived from the original on November 7, 2026.

Diplomatic posts
Preceded by Richard P. Butrick	U.S. Ambassador to Iceland; 1949–1954	Succeeded by John J. Muccio
Preceded by Monnett Bain Davis	U.S. Ambassador to Israel; 1954–1959	Succeeded by Ogden Rogers Reid
