= John J. Muccio =

Italian-born American diplomat

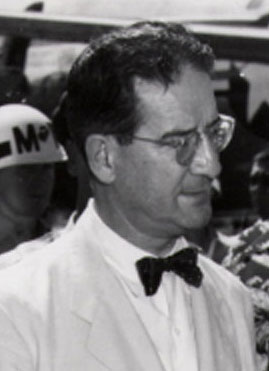
- Muccio in 1950

United States Ambassador to Guatemala
- In office February 1, 1960 – November 10, 1961
- President: Dwight D. Eisenhower; John F. Kennedy
- Preceded by: Lester D. Mallory
- Succeeded by: John O. Bell

1st United States Ambassador to Iceland
- In office November 3, 1955 – December 16, 1959
- President: Dwight D. Eisenhower
- Preceded by: Himself (as Minister)
- Succeeded by: Tyler Thompson

United States Minister to Iceland
- In office October 12, 1954 – November 3, 1955
- President: Dwight D. Eisenhower
- Preceded by: Edward B. Lawson
- Succeeded by: Himself (as Ambassador)

United States Ambassador to South Korea
- In office April 20, 1949 – September 8, 1952
- President: Harry S. Truman; Dwight D. Eisenhower
- Preceded by: Diplomatic relations established
- Succeeded by: Ellis O. Briggs

United States Consul in Hong Kong
- In office 1927–1929

Personal details
- Born: March 19, 1900 Valle Agricola, Italy
- Died: May 19, 1989 (aged 89) Washington, D.C., U.S.
- Resting place: Rock Creek Cemetery
- Children: 4
- Education: George Washington University

John Joseph Muccio (March 19, 1900 – May 19, 1989) was an Italian-born American diplomat who served as the first United States Ambassador to Korea following the establishment of the Republic of Korea in 1948. His title was "Special Representative of the President" (Harry Truman) in 1948–49 and Ambassador from 1949 through 1952. During his tenure, the Korean War began. In 1950, before the war broke out, he negotiated the first agreement on American military aid to Korea, worth $10 million at that time. Later that year, in testimony to Congress, Muccio called for increased assistance to Seoul and warned that Communist forces were a growing threat north of the 38th parallel.

After the North Korean invasion in June 1950, and the dispatch of U.S. army divisions to defend South Korea, Muccio informed the State Department that U.S. commanders had decided to fire on refugees approaching U.S. lines, for fear of enemy infiltrators. His letter, dated July 26, 1950, warned of “repercussions in the United States from the effectuation of these decisions.” On that same day U.S. troops began a three-day slaughter of South Korean refugees in what is known as the No Gun Ri massacre. An estimated 250-300 were killed, mostly women and children.

Through the first two years of the war, before he returned to State Department duty in Washington, Muccio was a crucial liaison in exerting U.S. influence over the South Korean president, Syngman Rhee, helping set the stage for armistice negotiations.

Under President Dwight Eisenhower, Muccio served as United States Ambassador to Iceland, where he previously served as Envoy Extraordinary and Minister Plenipotentiary.

Finally, Muccio served as United States Ambassador to Guatemala before he retired from the United States Foreign Service in 1961.

Diplomatic posts
Preceded by None	Ambassador of United States to South Korea; 1949–1952	Succeeded by Ellis O. Briggs
Preceded by Edward B. Lawson	Ambassador of United States to Iceland; 1954–1959	Succeeded by Tyler Thompson
Preceded by Lester D. Mallory	Ambassador of United States to Guatemala; 1960–1961	Succeeded by John O. Bell
