= Monnett Experimental Aircraft =

- Company type: Experimental Aircraft Kits and Plans
- Industry: Experimental Aircraft Manufacturer
- Fate: Sold to INAV Ltd. 1986
- Successor: Great Plains Aircraft Supply Company
- Headquarters: Elgin, Il
- Key people: John Monnett
- Products: Experimental Aircraft Kits and Plans

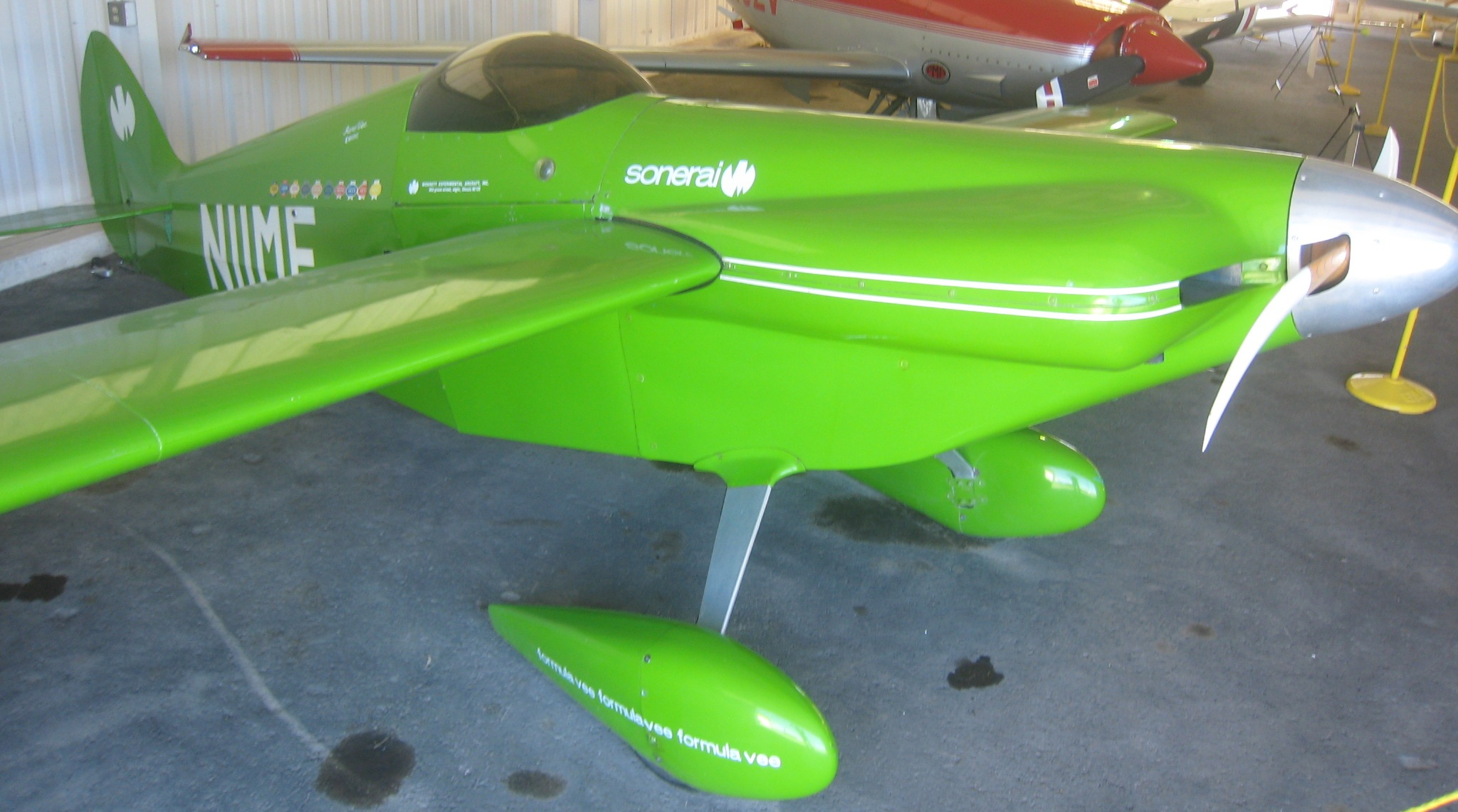
Sonerai I

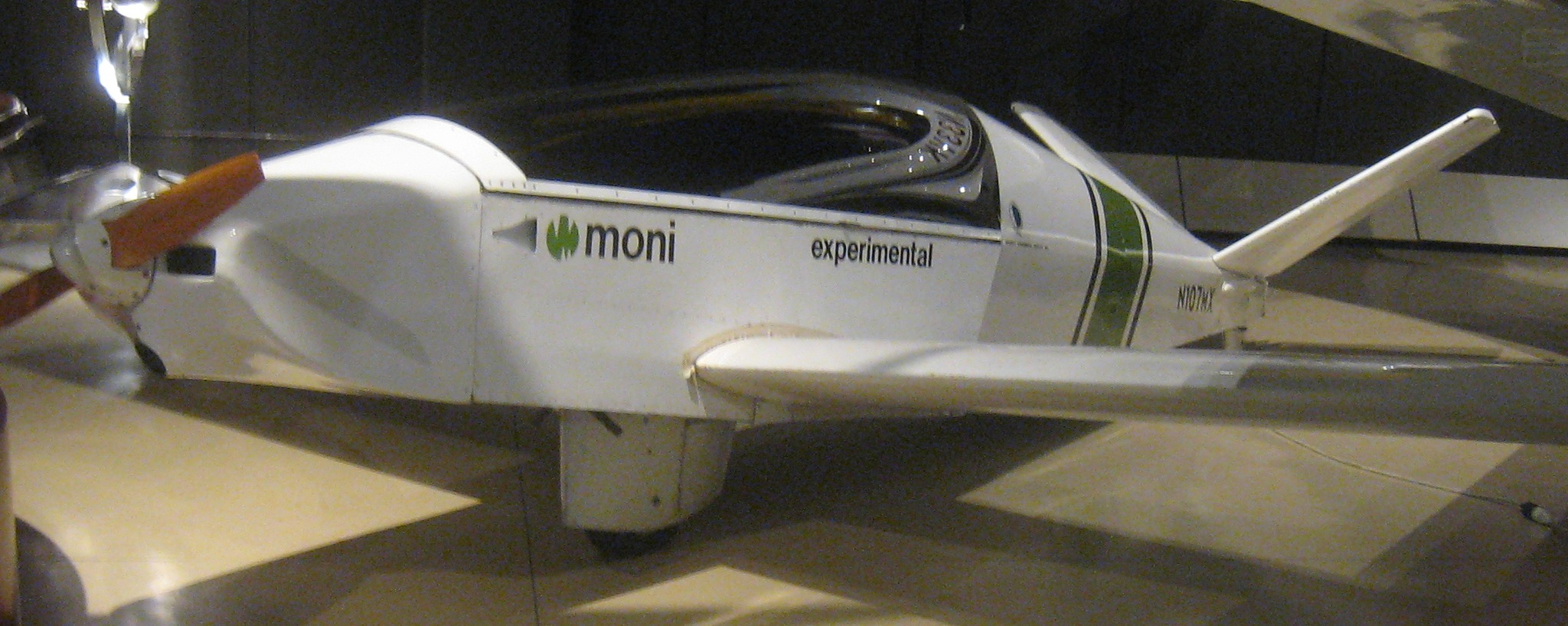
Moni

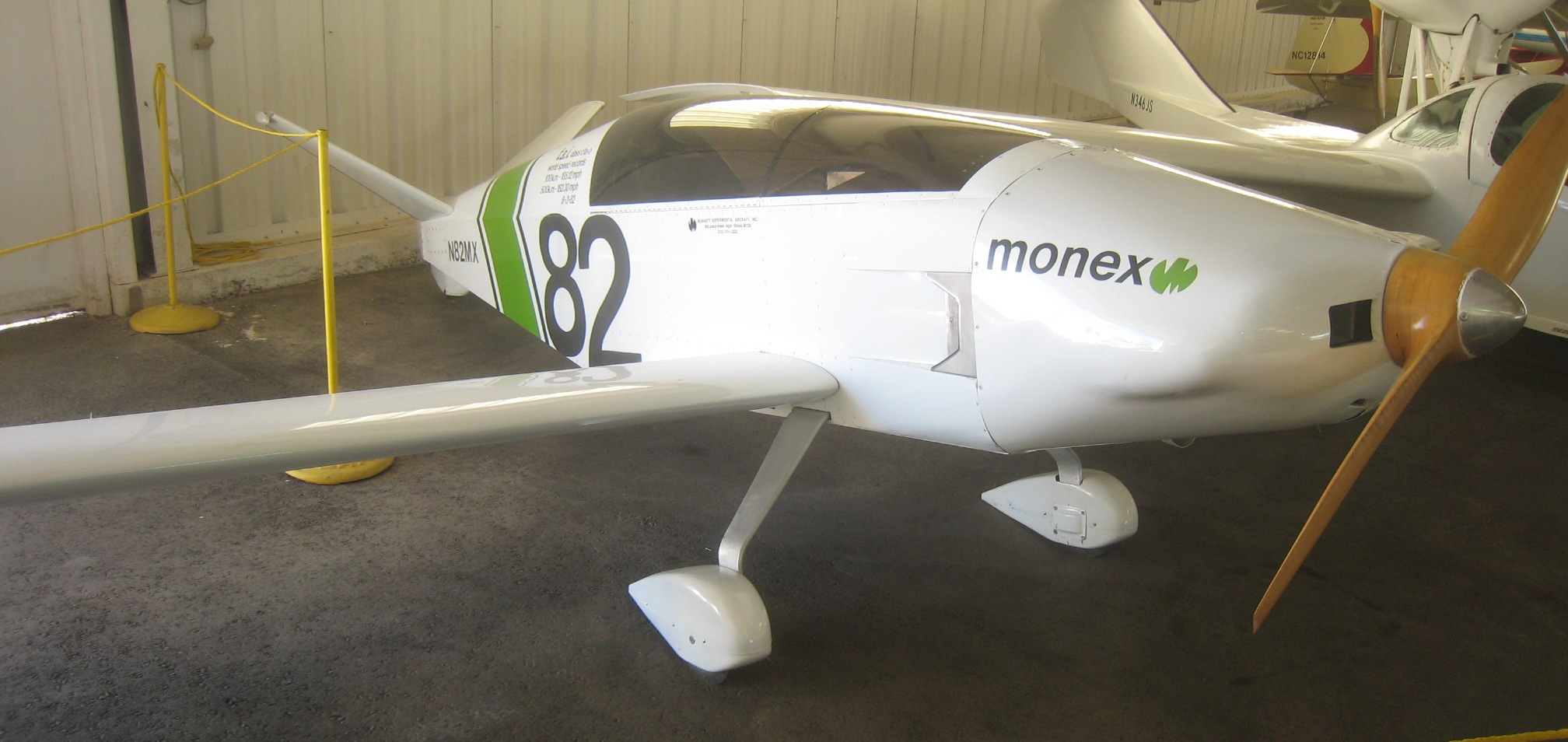
Monex

Monnett Experimental Aircraft was a United States aircraft manufacturer. Founded by John Monnett, a schoolteacher from Illinois who transitioned from a pilot of J3 Cubs and Aeronca Champs to building and designing tube-and-fabric racing aircraft built around the Volkswagen air-cooled engine. The company was founded to produce plans and kits for the Sonerai I aircraft. The Sonerai I was specially built to be used as a Formula V Air Racing racer. The follow-on aircraft, the Sonerai II was a two-seat modification that made the aircraft more marketable for sport piloting. In 1982, the company marketed its Moni motor glider. It was built of aluminum and featured bonded wing skins.

== Ownership history ==
In 1986 Monnett Experimental Aircraft was sold to INAV Ltd. INAV remained viable for only one year. The rights to the Sonerai series of aircraft were sold to HAPI, and were then again purchased by Great Plains Aircraft Supply Company, who still sells plans for the Sonerai aircraft. John Monnett went on to found a new company, Sonex Aircraft. Sonex and its follow-on aircraft have a common lineage to the VW engines of the Sonerai and simple aluminum construction of the Moni and Monex.

== Aircraft ==
Summary of aircraft built by Monnett Experimental Aircraft
Model name	First flight	Number built	Type
Sonerai I	1971	400+	Single Seat Formula V Racer
Sonerai II	1974	50+	Two Seat mid-wing
Monerai	1978	25+	Glider
Sonerai IIL	1981	25+	Two Seat low-wing
Monex	1981	1	Single seat V-tail racer
Moni	1982	1+	Single Seat Motor Glider
