= Monnett Bain Davis =

American diplomat (1893–1953)

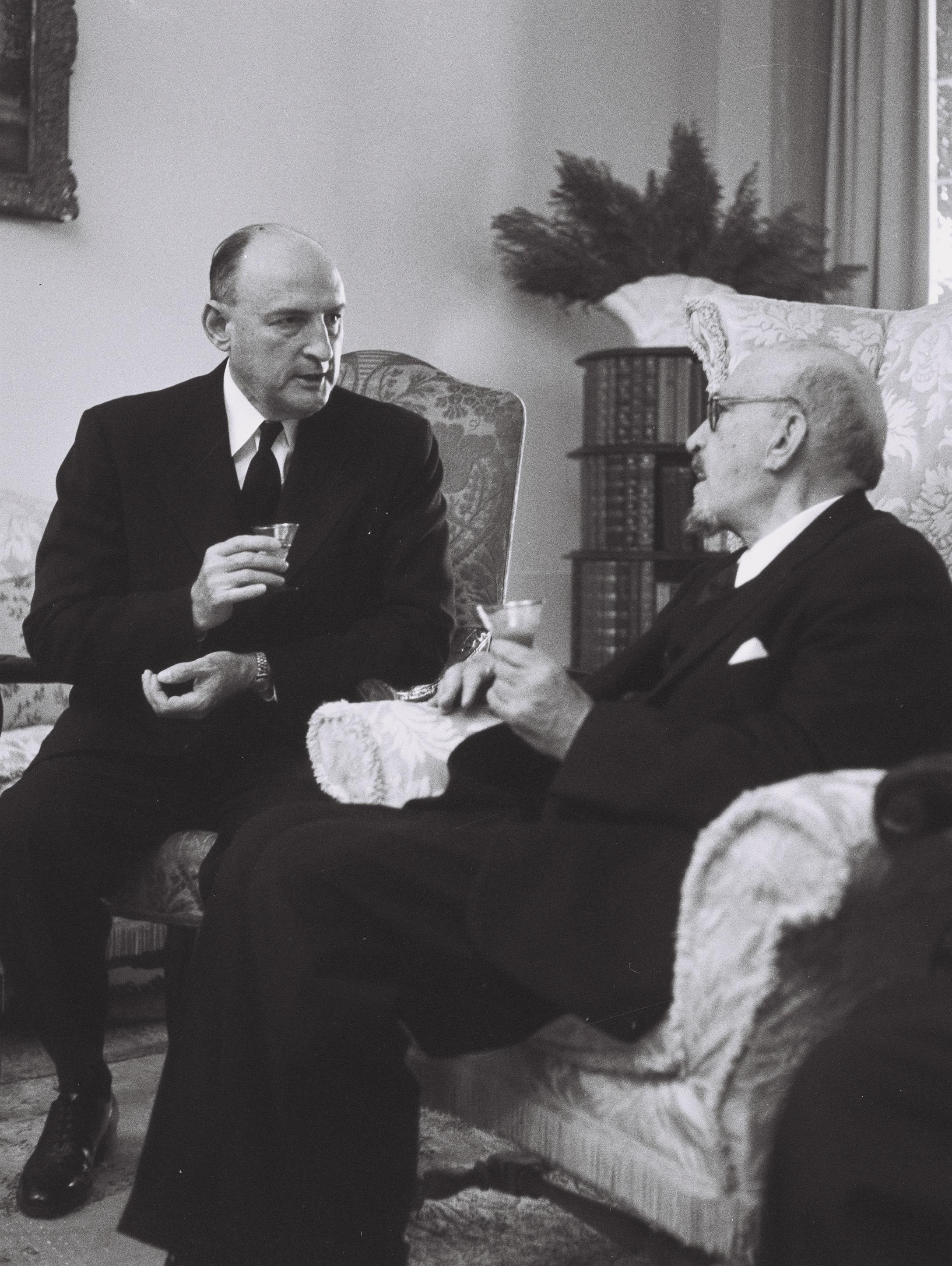
Monnett Bain Davis, United States Ambassador to Israel with Chaim Weizmann, President of Israel. 1951

Monnett Bain Davis (August 13, 1893 – December 26, 1953) was an American diplomat in the early and mid-20th century.

== Early life ==
Davis was born in Greencastle, Indiana on August 13, 1893. He was named for his maternal grandmother, Mary Monnett Bain, a benefactress of the Ohio Wesleyan University in Delaware, Ohio. He was educated at the University of Colorado, A.B.

During World War I, he served in the American Expeditionary Force (AEF) in the United States Army.

== Diplomatic career ==
Following WWI, Davis entered into the United States Foreign Service and served tours of duty representing American interests abroad as US Consul in Port Elizabeth (1921–23) and Saltillo (1924) and then as US Consul General in Stockholm (1933–1934), Shanghai (1935–36), Singapore (1936–37) and Buenos Aires (1938–41).

During WWII, he served as the Deputy Director of the Office of the Foreign Service and then as Director General of the Foreign Service.

Post World War II, Davis served as United States Minister in Denmark from June 1945 to January 1946. He was then appointed once again as United States Consul-General in Shanghai from 1946 to 1947. In 1948, we was given his assignment as United States Ambassador to Panama serving until 1951 before being transferred to the post of U.S. Ambassador to Israel in 1951.

== Death ==
Ambassador Davis died in his sleep in the United States Embassy in Tel Aviv on December 26, 1953. His body was returned to the United States and interred at Arlington National Cemetery (Section 2, Grave 4876).

== See also ==
- Mary Monnett Bain
- Orra E. Monnette

Diplomatic posts
Preceded by Ray Atherton	U.S. Ambassador to Denmark; 1945–1946	Succeeded by Josiah Marvel, Jr.
Preceded by Frank T. Hines	U.S. Ambassador to Panama; 1948–1951	Succeeded by John C. Wiley
Preceded by James McDonald	U.S. Ambassador to Israel; 1951–1953	Succeeded by Edward B. Lawson
