= Monnett Monex =

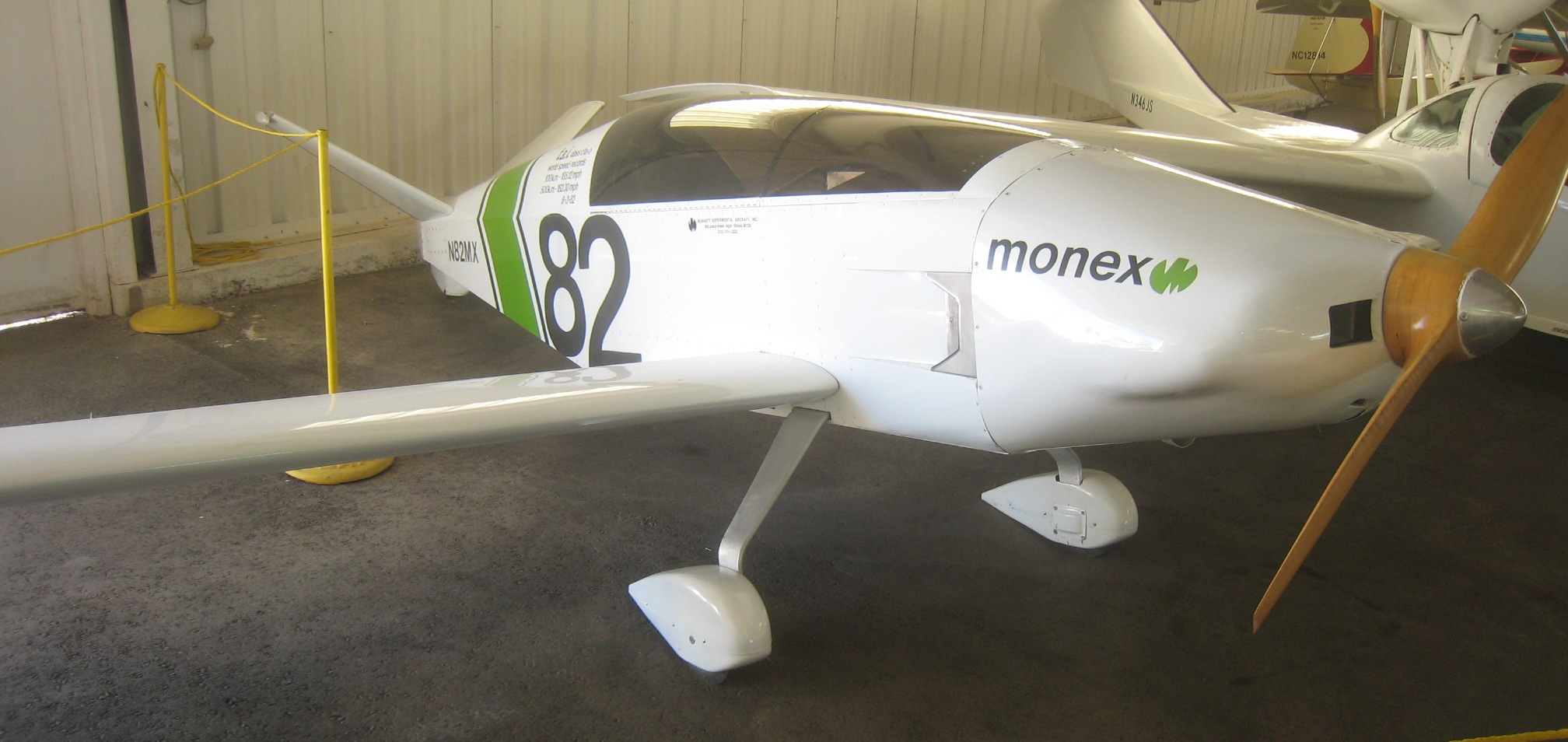
- The EAA Museum's Monnet Monex

General information
- Type: Homebuilt Aircraft
- National origin: United States of America
- Manufacturer: Monnett Experimental Aircraft
- Designer: John Monnett
- Status: On display
- Number built: 1

History
- First flight: September 30, 1980
- Retired: 1985
- Variant: Sonex Aircraft Sonex

The Monnett Monex is a single seat, all-aluminium, Volkswagen powered, homebuilt racer.

== Design and development ==
The Monex shares the same aluminium construction and basic fuselage shape as the Monnett Moni and the later Sonex Aircraft Sonex series of aircraft.

== Operational history ==
- 1982 - Lowers-Baker-Falk 500 Race - 3rd place (efficiency), 5th place (speed)
- 1982 - World Speed Record FAI's Class C-1a/0 185.12 mph (297,86 km/h) over 100 km
- 1982 - World Speed Record FAI's Class C-1a/0 182.308 mph (298,16 km/h) over 500 km

== Specifications (Monnett Monex) ==
Data from EAA

General characteristics

- Capacity: 1
- Length: 15 ft 2 in (4.62 m)
- Wingspan: 16 ft 8 in (5.08 m)
- Wing area: 46 sq ft (4.3 m^{2})
- Empty weight: 380 lb (172 kg)
- Gross weight: 650 lb (295 kg)
- Fuel capacity: 10 U.S. gallons (38 L; 8.3 imp gal)
- Powerplant: 1 × Volkswagen 2180cc four cylinder air-cooled engine, 60 hp (45 kW)

Performance

- Maximum speed: 190 kn (220 mph, 350 km/h)
- Range: 350 nmi (400 mi, 640 km)
- g limits: +6 -4
- Rate of climb: 2,000 ft/min (10 m/s)
