= Charles Monnett =

American Arctic wildlife biologist

Charles Monnett is an American Arctic wildlife biologist. He is the author of studies on the Arctic ecosystem, including several done for the United States Fish and Wildlife Service in the wake of the Exxon Valdez oil spill in 1989. He came to public attention for his work on behalf of the United States Department of the Interior (DOI).

The DOI managed natural gas, oil and other mineral resources on the United States Outer Continental Shelf via an agency, the Minerals Management Service, which was briefly known as the U.S. Bureau of Ocean Energy Management, Regulation and Enforcement (BOEMRE) before being dissolved in 2011. (The Bureau of Ocean Energy Management was in turn an agency of BOEMRE and survived its dissolution). Monnett was Contracting Officer's Representative (COR) for BOEMRE, Monnett coordinated much of the agency's research on Arctic wildlife and ecology and had duties that included managing about $50 million worth of studies on the impact of oil/gas drilling in the Arctic Ocean.

In July 2011, Monnett was suspended for 6 weeks, and lost his COR status, pending the outcome of an ongoing investigation by the Inspector General of the DOI. His defenders claimed he was subjected to a smear campaign.

Unrelated to the Inspector General investigation, in December 2013, the DOI settled a whistleblower suit initiated by Monnett. They cleared his record of any reference to wrongdoing and awarded him $100,000.

== Research ==
Some of Monnett's most noted work deals with polar bears and the effects of climate change on the species. Monnett was on a research flight tracking bowhead whales in 2004 when he and a colleague, Jeff Gleason, spotted four dead polar bears floating in the water after a storm. After additional research, Monnett found that this was "the first time dead bears [had] been spotted among more than 350 sightings of swimming bears recorded over 16 years of surveying the area." Monnett conjectured that this was due to "bears having to swim up to 60 miles across open sea to find food. They [were] being forced into the long voyages because the ice floes from which they feed [were] melting, becoming smaller and drifting farther apart."

Monnett published his findings in 2006 in an article in the peer-reviewed journal Polar Biology. Al Gore referenced Monnett's study in his 2006 documentary An Inconvenient Truth, which made the polar bears into an important symbol of climate change. The paper was cited by the U.S. Fish and Wildlife Service in its 2008 decision to list the polar bear as threatened under the Endangered Species Act.

== Investigation and suspension ==
On July 18, 2011, Monnett was suspended and put on administrative leave by BOEMRE, pending results of an investigation into "integrity issues" by the DOI Office of Inspector General. During his paid leave, he was forbidden from speaking to colleagues or entering any Interior offices.

BOEMRE director Michael Bromwich stated that Monnett's dismissal was not politically motivated, and did not involve questions about his scientific integrity. However, there was comment on the case from climate "sceptics" that did raise questions about the integrity of scientists. British politician and columnist Ann Widdecombe used the suspension of Monnett to support her view that "climate change money should go to armed services".

Monnett's legal representative, the non-profit watchdog group Public Employees for Environmental Responsibility (PEER), stated that Monnett was subjected to a "witch hunt" regarding his 2006 scientific paper on drowned polar bears and released a transcript of a February 2011 interview of Monnett conducted by criminal investigator of the DOI Office of Inspector General. Although Monnett was questioned in the interview about the polar bear paper, it is not clear what relation, if any, it had to the integrity issues which bureau officials have cited. The investigations did impact on Monnett's oversight of a Canadian research study: BOEMRE briefly issued a stop-work order on the study, which was providing data on the movements of radio-collared polar bears being monitored by Canadian scientists.

Monnett returned to work on August 25, although BOEMRE declared that Monnett would have no role in developing or managing contracts and would instead be in the environmental assessment division, and that future administrative actions are not ruled out.

The investigation of a scientist by criminal investigators of the Inspector General triggered an outcry of protests from scientists and environmental and legal watchdog groups alike. "There's no way this can have anything but a chilling effect on the ability of other scientists to carry out their work," says Kassie Siegel, director of the Climate Law Institute with the Center for Biological Diversity. and group of Australian scientists sent a letter to President Obama, stating "This seems like the type of anti-science action that would have occurred under your predecessor and is similar to actions more expected in the pre-1989 Soviet Union".

The Union of Concerned Scientists (UCS) so far takes a neutral stand on the issue. "We won't know, until the inspector general is done, exactly what the charges are and exactly what they are finding," says Francesca Grifo, director of the scientific integrity program at the Union of Concerned Scientists. Last year, UCS declared that the new DOI scientific integrity policy, as instated by Secretary of the Interior Ken Salazar on September 29, 2010, was "not an agency-wide scientific integrity policy as it states, but rather a scientist misconduct policy".

PEER filed an official complaint with the DOI to protest the treatment of Monnett under this suspension and inquiry, asked that Monnett be reinstated and that the investigation be dropped or pursued by specifying charges against Monnett, along with a public apology from BOEMRE and the Inspector General.

== Outcome ==
While Monnett was cleared of scientific misconduct over his polar bear surveys (this was reported for example by Andrew Revkin in The New York Times), disputes over the case continued into 2012, and Monnett was reprimanded for the improper release of government documents. The documents in question, issued from 2007 to early 2008, had been cited by the Court of Appeals for the Ninth Circuit in making decisions to vacate the Bureau of Ocean Energy Management´s approval of the Shell oil exploration plans in the Beaufort Sea. BOEM argued that the documents were exempt from the Freedom of Information Act, and thus should not have been disclosed.

Monnett and PEER then filed a suit arguing that the e-mails he disclosed showed that the agency was breaking laws to push through Arctic offshore drilling permits, and the reprimand thus represented retaliation against a whistleblower. In 2013 there was a settlement. The DOI claimed that there was no admission of liability on its part and that it settled "to avoid the costs of litigation". Under the settlement, Monnett retired from his federal job with the Bureau of Ocean Energy Management, whereupon the DOI removed all reprimand from Monnett's record and awarded him a cash settlement of $100,000. In addition to the other agreements in the settlement, a certificate was issued for a conservation award from the secretary of the interior which Monnett won in 2010, but had been deprived of.
