= Ohio Wesleyan Female College =

Coordinates: 40°18′03″N 83°04′37″W

Ohio Wesleyan Female College was a women's college, operating for two-and-a-half decades, until it merged into Ohio Wesleyan University in 1877. After starting as a Delaware, Ohio, academy for women in 1850, equivalent to a high school, it expanded its program in 1853 to begin service as a college. In 1877, the Ohio Wesleyan Female College merged with Ohio Wesleyan University. It had been a Coordinate College in relationship with that nearby men's school since 1853.

== History ==
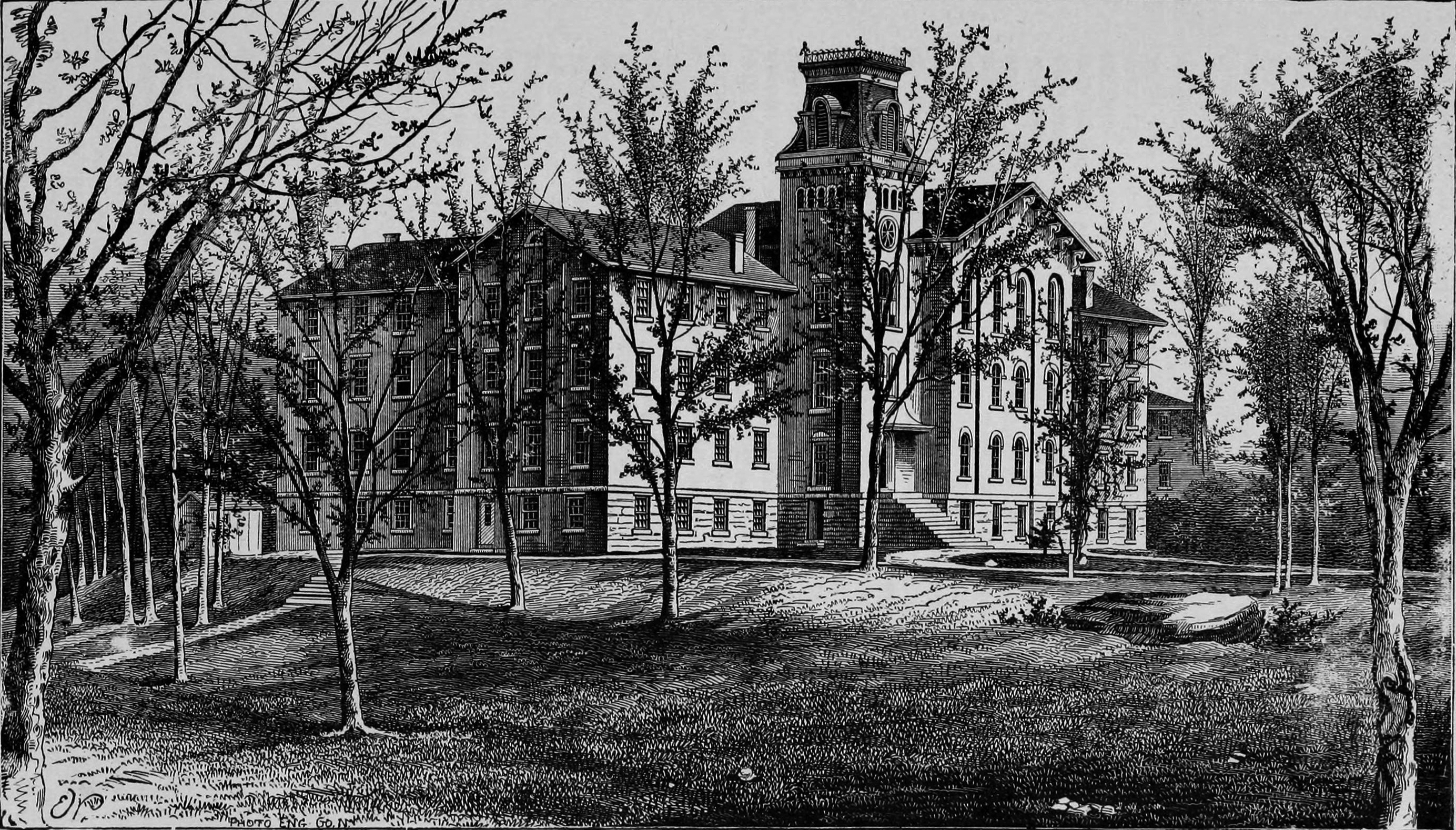
Monnett Hall, Original Section, Delaware Ohio. Monnett Hall was the primary building of the Wesleyan Female College.

It is one of the oldest institutions of higher education for women in the United States, which provided general educational opportunities to women in an era when co-educational institutions of higher learning were only sporadically open to students of both sexes. In 1855, funds for the school's first and only institutional building were obtained from Mary Monnett, a student who attended the school. The trustees named the main building Monnett Hall in her honor.

The main Wesleyan Female College Hall in Delaware, Ohio, was razed in the late 1970s and the site is now occupied by Monnett Gardens. Wesleyan's annual celebration of spring, Monnett Weekend, is held each April.

== Alumnae ==
- Melissa Elizabeth Riddle Banta, poet
- Sara Jane Crafts, educator, author, social reformer
- Cornelia Cole Fairbanks, class 1872, Second Lady of the United States during the vice-presidency of her husband Charles W. Fairbanks
- Lucy Webb Hayes, First Lady of the United States from 1877–1881
- Flora Wambaugh Patterson, 1847–1928, mycologist at the USDA who worked on numerous important fungal diseases

== See also ==
- List of current and historical women's universities and colleges
- List of Ohio Wesleyan University presidents
- List of coordinate colleges
