= Monnett Monerai =

Monerai
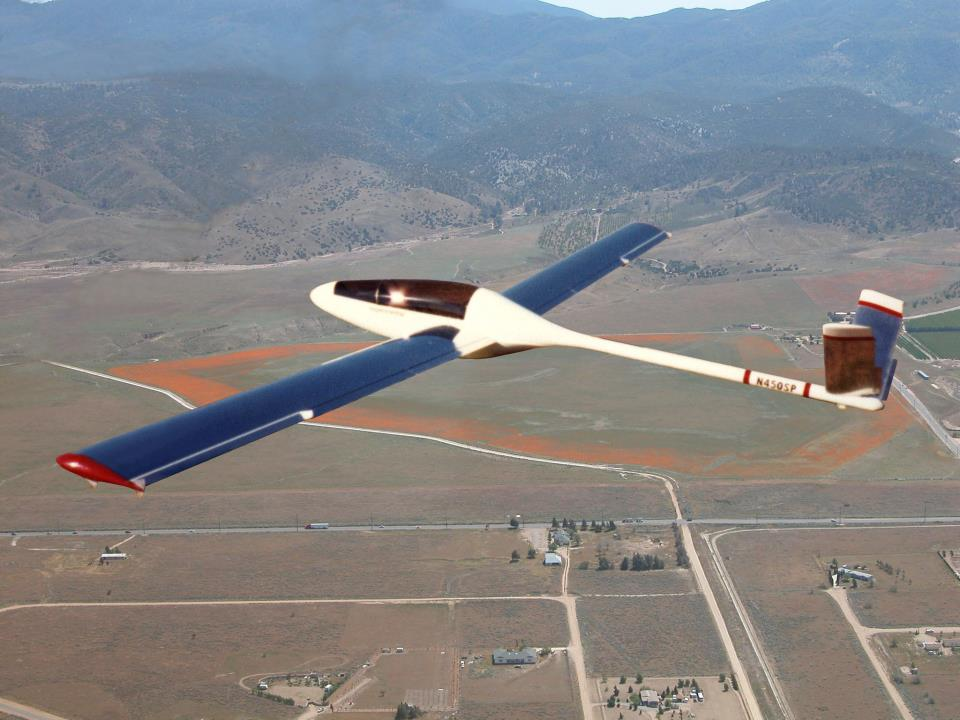
- Monerai S

General information
- Type: Sailplane
- National origin: United States
- Manufacturer: Monnett Experimental Aircraft
- Designer: John Monnett
- Number built: 100 by January 1984 from 375 kits sold

History
- Introduction date: 1978
- First flight: 1978

The Monnett Monerai is a sailplane that was developed in the United States in the late 1970s for homebuilding. It is a conventional pod-and-boom design with a V-tail and a mid-mounted cantilever wing of constant chord.

The kit assembles in approximately 600 hours. It has bonded wing skins and incorporates 90° flaps for glide path control. The pod-and-boom fuselage consists of a welded steel tube truss encased in a fiberglass shell, with an aluminum tube for the tailboom. A spar fitting modification was released in 1983.

A powered version was designed as the Monerai P with an engine mounted on a pylon above the wings. A Sachs Rotary Engine was chosen for the prototype. A version with extended wing tips is also available (Monerai Max) which increases the span to 12 m (39 ft) and raises the glide ratio from 28:1 to more than 30:1.

The powered Monerai P and the unpowered Monerai S versions are identical structurally.

== Variants ==
Monerai S
unpowered glider
Monerai P
powered glider equipped with the 22 hp (16 kW) Zenoah G-25 or the 25 hp (19 kW) KFM 107 engine.
Monerai Max
Monerai P version with extended wing tips

== Aircraft on display ==
- US Southwest Soaring Museum
- Serial Number 22 on display at the New England Air Museum, Bradley International Airport, Windsor Locks, CT
- S/N 323, Museum of Flying, Santa Monica Airport, CA
- Unregistered Monerai Glider on display at Shannon Aviation Museum, Co. Clare, Ireland.
- The first Monerai known to be built in the UK by Loudon Blair and Mervyn Farrell is now on display at the Ulster Aviation Society

== Specifications (Monerai S) ==
General characteristics

- Crew: One pilot
- Length: 19 ft 7 in (5.97 m)
- Wingspan: 36 ft 0 in (10.97 m)
- Height: 4 ft 4 in (1.32 m)
- Wing area: 78 sq ft (7.25 m^{2})
- Aspect ratio: 16.6:1
- Empty weight: 220 lb (100 kg)
- Gross weight: 450 lb (204 kg)

Performance

- Maximum speed: 120 mph (193 km/h, 100 kn)
- Maximum glide ratio: 28:1 at 60mph
- Rate of sink: 167 ft/min (0.85 m/s) at 55 mph: 167
