= List of ambassadors of the United States to Cyprus =

Ambassador of the United States to Cyprus
- Seal of the United States Department of State

- Flag of a United States ambassador

- Incumbent; John Breslow since September 9, 2026
- Nominator: The president of the United States
- Appointer: The president; with Senate advice and consent
- Inaugural holder: Fraser Wilkins as Ambassador Extraordinary and Plenipotentiary
- Formation: August 27, 1960
- Website: U.S. Embassy - Nicosia

This is a list of ambassadors of the United States to Cyprus.

Until 1960 Cyprus had been a colony of the British Empire. On August 16, 1960, Cyprus gained its independence from the United Kingdom. The United States recognized the new nation and established an embassy in Nicosia on August 16, 1960, with L. Douglas Heck as Chargé d'Affaires ad interim. Diplomatic relations between the United States and Cyprus have been continuous since that time.

One ambassador, Rodger P. Davies, was assassinated by a sniper while at his post in 1974.

The United States does not recognize the Turkish Republic of Northern Cyprus, proclaimed November 15, 1983, by Turkey.

The U.S. Embassy in Cyprus is located in Nicosia.

== Ambassadors ==
Name	Title	Appointed	Presented credentials	Terminated mission	Notes
Fraser Wilkins – Career FSO	Ambassador Extraordinary and Plenipotentiary	August 27, 1960	September 19, 1960	April 6, 1964	
Taylor G. Belcher – Career FSO	Ambassador Extraordinary and Plenipotentiary	May 1, 1964	May 11, 1964	June 23, 1969	
David H. Popper – Career FSO	Ambassador Extraordinary and Plenipotentiary	May 27, 1969	July 18, 1969	May 31, 1973	
Robert J. McCloskey – Career FSO	Ambassador Extraordinary and Plenipotentiary	May 24, 1973	June 20, 1973	January 14, 1974	
Rodger P. Davies – Career FSO	Ambassador Extraordinary and Plenipotentiary	May 2, 1974	July 10, 1974	August 19, 1974	Assassinated. Davies and three others were killed by sniper fire, believed to be perpetrated (Though unproven), by gunmen from EOKA B, a Greek Cypriot nationalist paramilitary organization.
William R. Crawford, Jr. – Career FSO	Ambassador Extraordinary and Plenipotentiary	August 23, 1974	August 31, 1974	March 27, 1978	
Galen L. Stone – Career FSO	Ambassador Extraordinary and Plenipotentiary	March 2, 1978	April 6, 1978	September 30, 1981	
Raymond Charles Ewing – Career FSO	Ambassador Extraordinary and Plenipotentiary	September 28, 1981	October 30, 1981	August 11, 1984	
Richard Wood Boehm – Career FSO	Ambassador Extraordinary and Plenipotentiary	August 13, 1984	August 28, 1984	August 15, 1987	
Bill K. Perrin – Political appointee	Ambassador Extraordinary and Plenipotentiary	April 1, 1988	May 3, 1988	July 21, 1989	The following officers served as chargés d’affaires ad interim: John U. Nix (July 1989–July 1990) and Carolyn Huggins (July 1990–November 1990).
Robert E. Lamb – Career FSO	Ambassador Extraordinary and Plenipotentiary	October 30, 1990	November 30, 1990	October 24, 1993	
Richard A. Boucher – Career FSO	Ambassador Extraordinary and Plenipotentiary	October 8, 1993	November 22, 1993	June 12, 1996	
Kenneth C. Brill – Career FSO	Ambassador Extraordinary and Plenipotentiary	June 11, 1996	July 11, 1996	July 25, 1999	
Donald Keith Bandler – Career FSO	Ambassador Extraordinary and Plenipotentiary	July 7, 1999	August 23, 1999	July 18, 2002	
Michael Klosson – Career FSO	Ambassador Extraordinary and Plenipotentiary	August 8, 2002	August 29, 2002	July 3, 2005	
Ronald L. Schlicher – Career FSO	Ambassador Extraordinary and Plenipotentiary	November 22, 2005	December 20, 2005	January 5, 2008	
Frank C. Urbancic Jr. – Career FSO	Ambassador Extraordinary and Plenipotentiary	August 14, 2008	September 9, 2008	July 24, 2011	
John M. Koenig – Career FSO	Ambassador Extraordinary and Plenipotentiary	August 2, 2012	September 12, 2012	July 26, 2015	
Kathleen A. Doherty - Career FSO	Ambassador Extraordinary and Plenipotentiary	March 24, 2015	October 7, 2015	January 31, 2019	
Judith G. Garber – Career FSO	Ambassador Extraordinary and Plenipotentiary	January 10, 2019	March 18, 2019	December 22, 2022	
Julie D. Fisher – Career FSO	Ambassador Extraordinary and Plenipotentiary	December 13, 2022	February 21, 2023	May 14, 2026	
Daniel E. Mangis – Career FSO	Chargé d'affaires ad interim	May 14, 2026		September 5, 2026	
John Breslow – Political appointee	Ambassador Extraordinary and Plenipotentiary	August 7, 2026	September 9, 2026	Present	

== See also ==
- Cyprus – United States relations
- Foreign relations of Cyprus
- Ambassadors of the United States
