= List of ambassadors of the United States to Oman =

Ambassador of the United States to Oman
- سفارة الولايات المتحدة الأميركية في سلطنة عمان
- Seal of the United States Department of State

- Flag of a United States ambassador

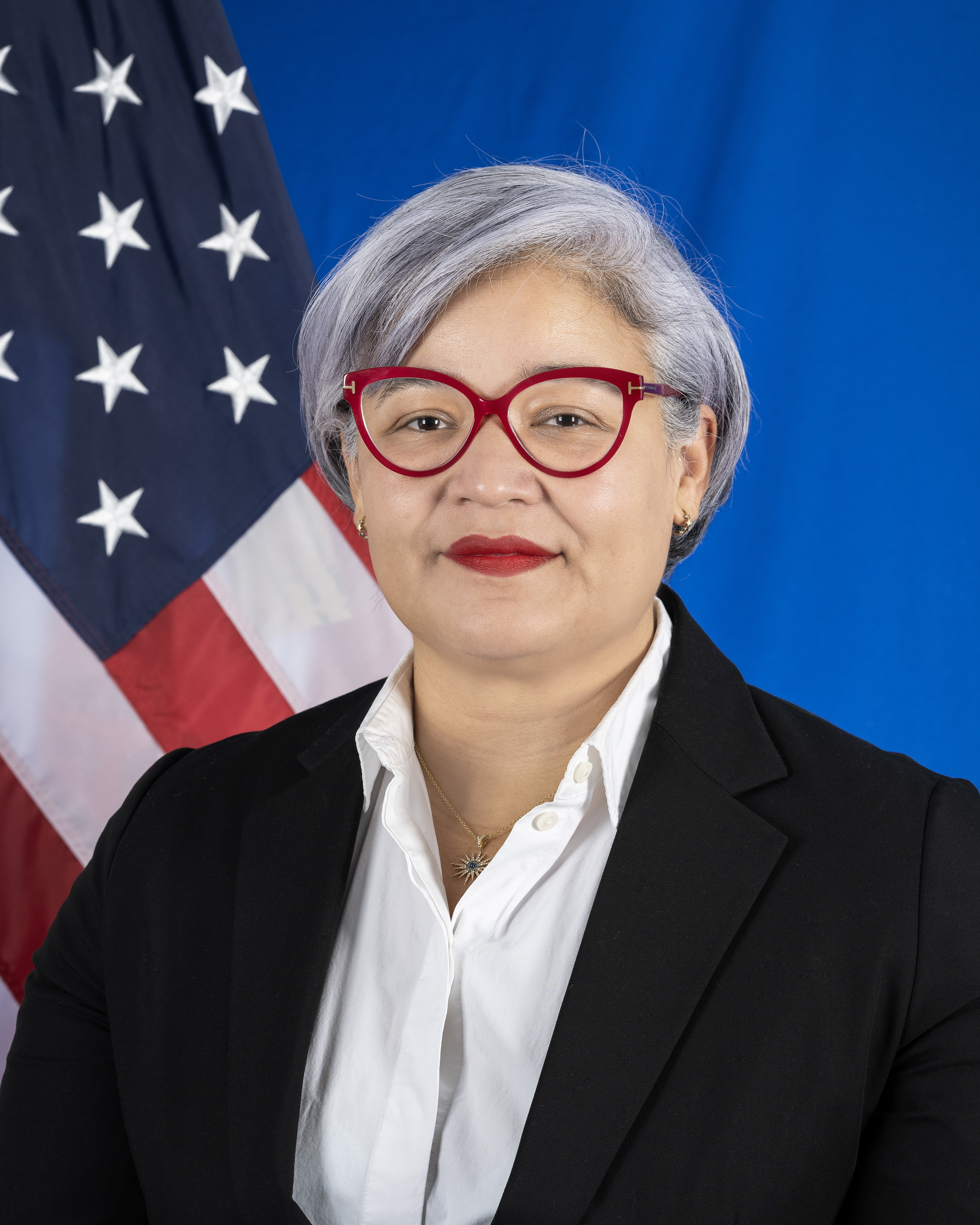
- Incumbent; Ana A. Escrogima since December 4, 2023
- Nominator: The president of the United States
- Appointer: The president with Senate advice and consent
- Inaugural holder: William A. Stoltzfus, Jr. as Envoy Extraordinary and Minister Plenipotentiary
- Formation: July 17, 1974
- Website: U.S. Embassy - Muscat

Diplomatic presence of the United States of America in Oman started in 1880 when the U.S. set up its consulate in Muscat. The consulate operated in Oman through 1915. U.S. interests in Oman, thereafter, were handled by U.S. diplomats resident in neighboring countries. In 1972, the U.S. ambassador to Kuwait, William Stoltzfus was accredited as the first U.S. ambassador to Oman, and the U.S. embassy, headed by a resident chargé d'affaires, was opened on July 4, 1972.

The first resident U.S. ambassador, William D. Wolle, took up his post in July 1974. U.S. Ambassador Wiley has played important roles in the development of Oman – United States relations, the staging of the Iran Hostage Rescue Attempt from Oman, and making it one of the most reliable Middle Eastern allies of the United States.

The United States Embassy in the Sultanate of Oman is located in the Shatti al-Qurum district in Muscat.

== Ambassadors ==
- William A. Stoltzfus, Jr. – Career FSO
  - Title: Envoy Extraordinary and Minister Plenipotentiary. Resident in Kuwait
  - Appointed: April 17, 1972
  - Terminated mission: Left post, July 16, 1974
- William D. Wolle – Career FSO
  - Title: Envoy Extraordinary and Minister Plenipotentiary.
  - Appointed: July 17, 1974
  - Terminated mission: Left post, April 25, 1978
- Marshall W. Wiley – Career FSO
  - Title: Envoy Extraordinary and Minister Plenipotentiary.
  - Appointed: November 7, 1978
  - Terminated mission: Left post, May 19, 1981
- John R. Countryman – Career FSO
  - Title: Envoy Extraordinary and Minister Plenipotentiary.
  - Appointed: October 14, 1981
  - Terminated mission: Left post, July 29, 1985
- George Cranwell Montgomery – Political appointee
  - Title: Envoy Extraordinary and Minister Plenipotentiary.
  - Appointed: September 11, 1985
  - Terminated mission: Left post, January 18, 1989
- Richard Wood Boehm – Career FSO
  - Title: Envoy Extraordinary and Minister Plenipotentiary.
  - Appointed: November 12, 1989
  - Terminated mission: Left post, October 12, 1992
- David J. Dunford – Career FSO
  - Title: Envoy Extraordinary and Minister Plenipotentiary.
  - Appointed: November 1, 1992
  - Terminated mission: Left post, June 21, 1995
- Frances D. Cook – Career FSO
  - Title: Envoy Extraordinary and Minister Plenipotentiary.
  - Appointed: January 2, 1996
  - Terminated mission: Left post, January 10, 1999
- John B. Craig – Career FSO
  - Title: Envoy Extraordinary and Minister Plenipotentiary.
  - Appointed: February 15, 1999
  - Terminated mission: Left post, September 22, 2001
- Robert W. Dry – Career FSO
  - Title: Envoy Extraordinary and Minister Plenipotentiary. Ad Interim
  - Appointed: September 22, 2001
  - Terminated mission: Left post, October 16, 2002
- Richard L. Baltimore III – Career FSO
  - Title: Envoy Extraordinary and Minister Plenipotentiary.
  - Appointed: November 5, 2002
  - Terminated mission: Left post, March 5, 2006
- Gary A. Grappo – Career FSO
  - Title: Envoy Extraordinary and Minister Plenipotentiary.
  - Appointed: September 17, 2006
  - Terminated mission: Left post, June 1, 2009
- Richard J. Schmierer – Career FSO
  - Title: Envoy Extraordinary and Minister Plenipotentiary
  - Appointed: August 20, 2009
  - Terminated mission: Left post, August 3, 2012
- Greta C. Holtz - Career FSO
  - Title: Envoy Extraordinary and Minister Plenipotentiary
  - Appointed: October 9, 2012
  - Terminated mission: Left post, December 7, 2015
- Marc J. Sievers - Career FSO
  - Title: Envoy Extraordinary and Minister Plenipotentiary
  - Appointed: January 7, 2016
  - Terminated mission: November 30, 2019
- Leslie Tsou - Career FSO
  - Title: Ambassador Extraordinary and Minister Plenipotentiary
  - Appointed: December 31, 2019
  - Presented credentials: January 10, 2020
  - Terminated mission: March 30, 2023
- Ana A. Escrogima - Career FSO
  - Title: Ambassador Extraordinary and Minister Plenipotentiary
  - Appointed: October 17, 2023
  - Presented credentials: December 4, 2023
  - Terminated mission: Incumbent

== See also ==
- Oman – United States relations
- Foreign relations of Oman
- Ambassadors of the United States
