= Galen L. Stone (diplomat) =

American diplomat

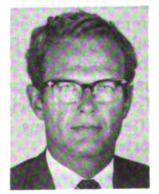

US Ambassador to Cyprus
- In office March 2, 1978 – September 30, 1981
- President: Jimmy Carter
- Preceded by: William R. Crawford, Jr.
- Succeeded by: Raymond Charles Ewing

Personal details
- Born: July 4, 1921
- Died: January 23, 2018 (aged 96)
- Education: Harvard University

Military service
- Allegiance: United States
- Branch/service: United States Army
- Rank: Captain

Galen Luther Stone (July 4, 1921 – January 23, 2018) was an American diplomat for the United States Department of State. He served as United States ambassador to Cyprus from 1978 to 1981.

== Biography ==
Stone was born on July 4, 1921, in Brookline, Massachusetts. He graduated from Harvard University in 1946 with a bachelor's degree. He served in the United States Army during World War II.

In 1947, he joined the United States Foreign Service. He started in Munich as an economic officer in the US embassy. He then served a tour in Kiel in the same position from 1950 to 1954. From 1954 to 1958, Stone was a political officer in Paris at the Supreme Headquarters of Allied Powers in Europe. Stone was the designated officer in charge of Swiss–Benelux affairs in 1961. Then in 1963, he was made deputy director of the Office of West European Affairs and studied at the Imperial Defence College in London. He also held a position in Saigon as chief of the US embassy's political section. In 1966, Stone was presented the Department's Meritorious Honor Award.

From 1969 to 1973, Stone was the Deputy Chief of Mission in New Delhi. In 1975, Stone was appointed as the ambassador to Laos, but he didn't serve in this position. In 1978, he was selected to be the United States Ambassador to Cyprus. At the time of his appointment, Stone was the deputy US representative to the International Atomic Energy Agency.

His grandfather, also Galen Luther Stone (1862–1926) was a financier and philanthropist, and a major benefactor of Wellesley College. Stone died in January 2018 at the age of 96.

Diplomatic posts
| Preceded by William R. Crawford Jr. | United States Ambassador to Cyprus; 1974 | Succeeded by Raymond C. Ewing |
