= Taylor G. Belcher =

American diplomat (1920–1990)

Taylor Garrison Belcher
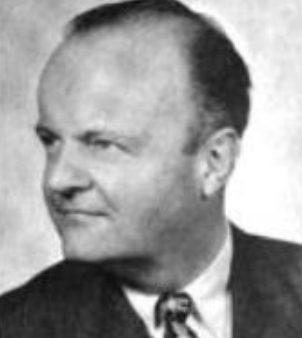
- Martin F. Herz, from a 1962 publication of the U.S. State Department

United States Ambassador to Cyprus
- In office May 11, 1964 – June 23, 1969
- Preceded by: Fraser Wilkins
- Succeeded by: David H. Popper

United States Ambassador to Peru
- In office 1969–1974
- Preceded by: J. Wesley Jones
- Succeeded by: Robert W. Dean

Personal details
- Born: July 1, 1920 Staten Island, New York, U.S.
- Died: August 6, 1990 (aged 70) New York, U.S.
- Spouse: Edith Anthony
- Children: 2
- Education: Brown University
- Profession: Naval officer, Politician

Taylor Garrison Belcher (July 1, 1920 – August 6, 1990) was a United States Ambassador to Cyprus and Peru who helped mediate conflicts in both countries.

== Early life ==
Taylor Garrison Belcher was born in Staten Island. His parents were Taylor Belcher and Miriam (Frazee) Belcher. He graduated from Brown University with a degree in international trade and finance in 1941.

== Family ==
Belcher married Edith Anthony on October 22, 1942. They had two sons, Anthony and Taylor III.

== Career ==
=== Early career ===
During World War II, Belcher served in the Navy as an officer of the battleship, Alabama. After the war, he joined the State Department. During his tenure with the State Department, he was stationed at Mexico City, Glasgow and Washington.

=== Political career ===
Belcher was appointed ambassador to Cyprus by President Lyndon B. Johnson in 1964. He served in that position until 1969. Belcher was awarded the State Department's Secretary's Distinguished Service Award as a result of his peace-keeping abilities during the eruption of violence between Greek and Turkish Cypriots. In 1969, he was appointed ambassador to Peru by President Richard Nixon. He served as ambassador to Peru until his retirement in 1974.

== Other activities ==
Belcher served in various organizations. At the time of his death, he was a director of the Putnam County Historical Society, a trustee and chairman of the Alice and Hamilton Fish Library, a trustee of the Malcolm Gordon School, and president of the Garrison Station Plaza and the Garrison's Landing Association. He was also a former chairman of the Heritage Task Force for the Hudson Valley.

== Later life ==
After his retirement from public service, Belcher lived in Garrison's Landing in Garrison, New York.

=== Death ===
Belcher died at Peekskill Community Hospital in New York on August 6, 1990, at the age of 70. According to a family spokesman, he died of cancer.

Diplomatic posts
| Preceded by Fraser Wilkins | United States Ambassador to Cyprus; 1964–1969 | Succeeded by David H. Popper |
| Preceded by J. Wesley Jones | United States Ambassador to Peru; 1969–1974 | Succeeded by Robert W. Dean |
