= William R. Crawford Jr. =

American diplomat

William Rex Crawford Jr.

United States Ambassador to Cyprus
- In office August 23, 1974 – March 27, 1978
- President: Gerald R. Ford; Jimmy Carter
- Preceded by: Rodger P. Davies
- Succeeded by: Galen L. Stone

United States Ambassador to Yemen
- In office October 12, 1972 – July 6, 1974
- President: Richard Nixon
- Preceded by: Robert A. Stein
- Succeeded by: Thomas J. Scotes

Personal details
- Born: 1928 Philadelphia, Pennsylvania, US
- Died: August 4, 2002 (aged 74) Greensboro, Vermont, US
- Spouse(s): Virginia Vollrath Lowry (m. 1950; died 1987) Celia Faulkner Crawford
- Children: 1
- Education: Harvard University; University of Pennsylvania

William Rex Crawford Jr. (1928 – August 4, 2002) was a United States ambassador to Yemen and Cyprus who served in the United States Foreign Service for 30 years. He was born in Philadelphia and lived abroad for some years during his childhood due to his father's job. After graduating from Harvard University and the University of Pennsylvania, he entered the Foreign Service, where he served in various senior positions, including as an ambassador between 1972 and 1978, until his retirement.

== Early life ==
William Rex Crawford Jr. was born in Philadelphia, Pennsylvania, to William Rex Crawford and Dorothy (Buckley) Crawford. In the 1930s and 1940s, he accompanied his father, a sociology professor at the University of Pennsylvania, on his work stints abroad. They spent time in France where his father had a Guggenheim Fellowship, in Chile where his father worked as an exchange professor, and in Brazil where his father was the cultural attaché at the US embassy in Rio de Janeiro.

Crawford obtained a bachelor's degree from Harvard University in 1949 and a master's degree from the University of Pennsylvania in 1950. He also served in the United States Navy and studied abroad at the Institut des Langues Orientales Vivantes in Paris.

== Career ==
Crawford entered the United States Foreign Service in 1950, and between 1950 and 1972, he was stationed in Jeddah, Saudi Arabia; Venice, Italy; Beirut, Lebanon; and Aden, Yemen. Some of the positions he served in during these years included director of Israeli and Arab-Israeli affairs at the Department of State, officer-in-charge of Arab-Israeli affairs at the Department of State, counselor at the US embassy in Morocco, and deputy ambassador to Cyprus. In 1963, he was awarded the William A. Jump Award for his service to the US government.

In 1972, Crawford was appointed the US ambassador to Yemen. He served in this position until 1974. In 1974, the US ambassador to Cyprus, Rodger Davies, was assassinated in Nicosia, and Crawford was appointed his replacement. He served in this position until 1978.

Following his resignation as the ambassador to Cyprus, Crawford became the deputy assistant secretary of state for the Bureau of Near Eastern and South Asian Affairs in the Department of State. He retired from the Foreign Service in 1980.

After his retirement from the Foreign Service, Crawford remained active in various activities. He served as the executive director of the National Committee to Honor the 14th Centenary of Islam, as well as the president of Eisenhower Fellowships.

== Personal life ==
Crawford married Virginia Lowry Crawford in 1950, and they had one daughter, Sarah Crawford-Najafi. Virginia died in 1987, and he remarried, to Celia Faulkner Crawford.

Crawford died of cancer at his home in Greensboro, Vermont, on August 4, 2002, at the age of 74.

Diplomatic posts
Preceded by Robert A. Stein	United States Ambassador to Yemen; 1972–1974	Succeeded by Thomas J. Scotes
Preceded by Rodger P. Davies	United States Ambassador to Cyprus; 1974–1978	Succeeded by Galen L. Stone
