= Frances D. Cook =

American diplomat (born 1945)

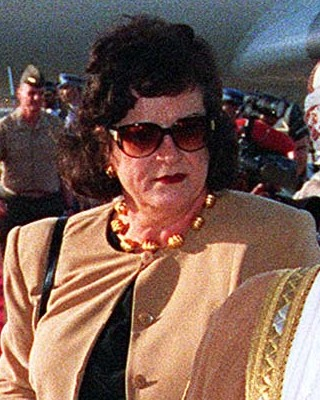
- Cook in 1997

7th Ambassador of the United States to Burundi
- In office September 25, 1980 – March 15, 1983
- President: Jimmy Carter; Ronald Reagan
- Preceded by: Thomas J. Corcoran
- Succeeded by: James R. Bullington

10th Ambassador of the United States to Cameroon
- In office December 21, 1989 – January 1, 1993
- President: George H. W. Bush
- Preceded by: Mark L. Edelman
- Succeeded by: Harriet W. Isom

8th Ambassador of the United States to Oman
- In office January 2, 1996 – January 10, 1999
- President: Bill Clinton
- Preceded by: David J. Dunford
- Succeeded by: John B. Craig

Personal details
- Born: Frances Dee Cook; September 7, 1945 (age 80) Charleston, West Virginia, United States of America
- Education: Mary Washington College (1967, B.A.); John F. Kennedy School of Government (1978, M.P.A.)

Frances Dee Cook (born September 7, 1945) served as a career foreign service officer who was the US ambassador to the Republic of Burundi from 1980–1983, US ambassador to the Republic of Cameroon, 1989–1993 and she was sworn in as the US ambassador to the Sultanate of Oman on December 28, 1995.

As ambassador to Oman and Consul General in Alexandria, Egypt, she was the first female chief of mission in the Persian Gulf, and the first female head of post in the Middle East for the United States.

Cook heads her own international business consulting firm, The Ballard Group, and is managing director of the Quincy Group, a strategic advisory firm and merchant bank.

== Early life and education ==
Cook was born in Charleston, West Virginia to Nash and Vivian Cook but grew up in Homestead, Florida. She earned a BA from Mary Washington College of the University of Virginia in 1967. In 1978, she received a M.P.A. from the John F. Kennedy School of Government at Harvard University.

== Career ==
After joining the Foreign Service in 1967 and completing language school, Cook’s first assignment was to be Special Assistant to Sargent Shriver, Ambassador to France from 1968–1969. Her future posts included being a member of the U.S. Delegation to Paris Peace Talks on Vietnam, 1970–1971; U.S. Consulate General, Sydney, Australia, 1971–1973; U.S. Embassy, Dakar, Senegal, 1973–1975; Personnel Officer for Africa, USIA, 1975–1977; Director of the Press Office, Bureau of African Affairs, Department of State, 1978–1980; Consul General, Alexandria, Egypt, 1983–1986; Deputy Assistant Secretary of State for International Assistance, Bureau of Refugee Programs, 1986–1987; Director, Office of West Africa Affairs, Department of State, 1987–1989; and Deputy Assistant Secretary of State for Regional Security Affairs, Bureau of Political-Military Affairs, 1993–1995. From 2010–2020, Cook served as a member of the board of trustees at The American College of the Mediterranean (ACM), an American-style degree-granting institution in Aix-en-Provence, France, which includes IAU College, a study abroad institute for undergraduates.
