= Urbancic =

Urbancic is a surname. Notable people with the surname include:

- Frank C. Urbancic Jr. (1951–2016), American diplomat
- Ivo Urbančič (1930–2016), Slovenian philosopher
- Jošt Urbančič (born 2001), Slovenian footballer
- Nataša Urbančič (1945–2011), Slovenian javelin thrower
- Victor Urbancic (1903–1958), Austrian composer and conductor
