= AMIDEAST =

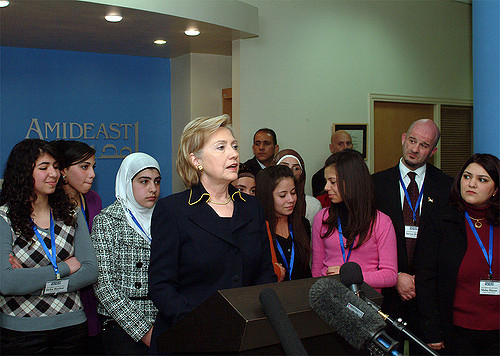
Secretary of state Hillary Clinton at an Amideast event.

Amideast (the America-Mideast Educational and Training Services) is a U.S. non-profit organization that works to strengthen mutual understanding and cooperation between Americans and the peoples of the Middle East and North Africa, and to offer opportunities for learning and training. Established in 1951 and based in Washington, DC, the organization since 2023 has been headed by CEO Ambassador (ret) Greta C. Holtz. By 2016, Amideast had provided English language and professional training to 58,000 students, gave lectures on education in USA to 87,000 attendants, administered 200,000 tests, and offered scholarships to 1,700 applicants. As of 2018, Amideast had provided its services to 500,000 people.

== Programs ==
Amideast provides English language and professional skills training, educational advising, and testing services to hundreds of thousands of students and professionals in the Middle East and North Africa; supports numerous institutional development projects in the region; and administers educational exchange programs. They have an annual portfolio of US$66 million and a staff of 1,200 amongst their 20+ offices.

Amideast is headquartered in Washington, D.C., and maintains a network of field offices in Egypt, Iraq, Jordan, Kuwait, Lebanon, Libya, Morocco, Saudi Arabia, Tunisia, United Arab Emirates, West Bank and Yemen as well as conducting activities in other countries in the Middle East and North Africa.

== History ==
Amideast was founded in 1951 as American Friends of the Middle East, and over the years has expanded its offerings to include English-language instruction, professional development courses for companies whose employees work in the Middle East, test administration, U.S. study advising, institutional development projects, and study-abroad and exchange programs for both Americans and Middle Easterners.

As the American Friends of the Middle East, the organization sponsored the exchange of scholars, artists, and lecturers between the Middle East and the United States.
