= Princes and Thieves =

- Author: Matthew Cole
- Language: English
- Subject: United States foreign policy and relations with the Middle East
- Genre: Investigative journalism
- Publisher: Atria / One Signal Publishers
- Publication date: October 2026
- Pages: 320 (US edition)
- ISBN: 9781668095324

Princes and Thieves is a 2026 work of political investigative journalism by American journalist Matthew Cole. The American edition is subtitled Jared Kushner and Mohamed bin Zayed's Secret Plot to Remake the Middle East. The book examines relationships between Jared Kushner, Mohamed bin Zayed Al Nahyan and Mohammed bin Salman, presenting the author's allegations that money and personal connections were used to influence United States policy toward the Middle East during Donald Trump's first presidency. The American edition was published by Atria / One Signal Publishers, an imprint of Simon & Schuster, and runs to 320 pages.

Excerpts prompted media discussion about conflicts of interest and transparency in American diplomacy. Kushner and his lawyers denied the allegations concerning the bank accounts and financial arrangements described by Cole.

== Author and background ==
Cole is an investigative journalist specializing in national security who has spent more than two decades covering American covert wars and intelligence programs. He previously worked as an investigative producer for ABC News and NBC News, and as a national security reporter for The Intercept. His earlier book is Code Over Country: The Tragedy and Corruption of SEAL Team Six. His reporting has also appeared in publications including The New York Times and GQ.

== Subject and contents ==
The book focuses on the intersection of political influence, finance and intelligence relationships in shaping regional arrangements. According to the publisher's description, Cole examines connections between Emirati and Saudi leaders and Kushner, alongside other figures including Erik Prince, the founder of Blackwater. Cole links this network to efforts to develop closer relations with Israel, confront Iran and shape policy toward the Palestinians.

An excerpt published by Vanity Fair on October 22, 2026, describes Cole's investigation into alleged secret banking arrangements following information about intelligence surveillance of Kushner's phone. Cole alleges that Emirati and Saudi officials provided Kushner access to approximately $2 billion for political objectives outside normal channels. The allegations, which raise questions about financial disclosure and political influence, were denied by those concerned.

== Publication and editions ==
The American edition was published as Princes and Thieves: Jared Kushner and Mohamed bin Zayed's Secret Plot to Remake the Middle East. Google Books lists a British edition published by Ithaka Press with the shorter subtitle The Secret Plot to Remake the Middle East, dated October 6, 2026, and comprising 288 pages. It has a different ISBN from the American edition.

Edition	Publisher	Pages	ISBN
American	Atria / One Signal Publishers	320	9781668095324
British	Ithaka Press	288	9781806177059

== Coverage and responses ==
In a review for Reason, Matthew Petti described the book as combining documented connections with secondhand accounts from anonymous sources. He noted Cole's use of a draft autobiography by Erik Prince, messages from one of Prince's colleagues and emails from Emirati adviser George Nader, while observing that the most consequential allegations about Kushner relied on unnamed sources. Petti also reported Cole's statement that he remained confident in his reporting after considering the responses from Kushner's lawyers.

Polskie Radio's English-language service reported that Kushner rejected the allegations and argued that the author had provided no verifiable banking records to substantiate them. His lawyers denied that the accounts existed or that he knew of the entity described, maintained that he had complied with applicable laws, and indicated possible legal action against the author and publisher. Former United States ambassador to Israel David M. Friedman also denied the allegations concerning his involvement.

On October 30, 2026, Representative Jamie Raskin, the ranking Democrat on the House Judiciary Committee, cited the Vanity Fair excerpts in calling for Kushner to recuse himself from negotiations concerning the Middle East and Ukraine. Raskin requested a comprehensive account of the bank accounts and other financial instruments Kushner could access while in government, and disclosure of foreign payments and financial interests to assess potential conflicts with his diplomatic role.
