= John M. Koenig =

American diplomat (born 1958)

John Koenig
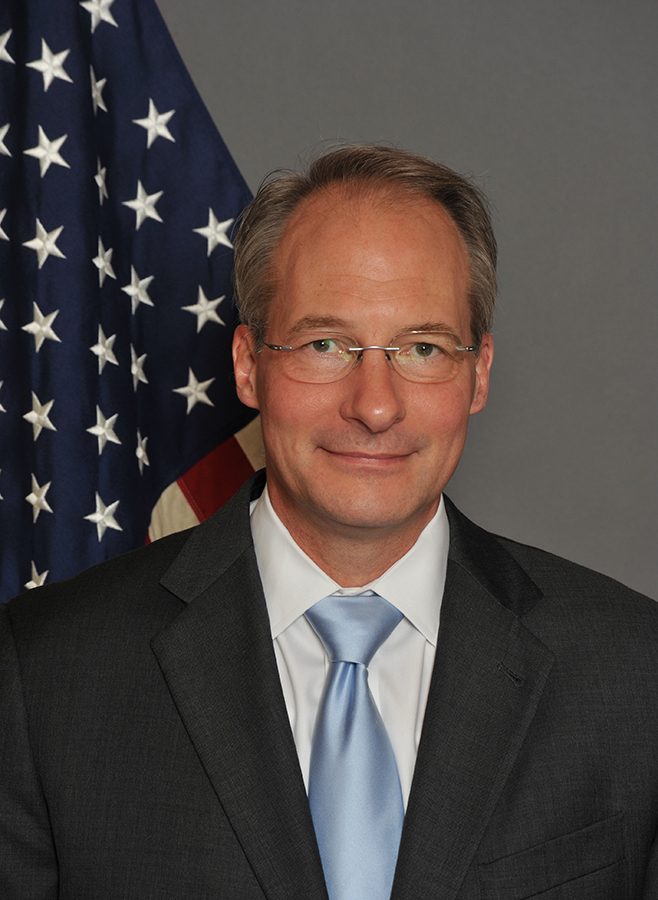

United States Ambassador to Cyprus
- In office September 12, 2012 – July 26, 2015
- President: Barack Obama
- Preceded by: Frank Urbancic
- Succeeded by: Kathleen Doherty

Personal details
- Born: September 24, 1958 (age 68) Tacoma, Washington, U.S.
- Spouse: Natalie Koenig
- Education: University of Washington, Seattle; Johns Hopkins University

John M. Koenig (born September 24, 1958) is an American diplomat who served as the United States Ambassador to Cyprus from 2012 to 2015.

== Early life and education ==
Koenig was born in Tacoma, Washington. As a teenager, he visited Pakistan with a family friend and was later an exchange student. He earned a B.A. in anthropology from the University of Washington and a master's degree in foreign relations from Johns Hopkins University.

== Career ==
A career foreign service officer, he has held assignments in Belgium, Greece, Indonesia, Italy and the Philippines. He served as Deputy Chief of Mission at the U.S. embassy in Berlin. He was confirmed as Ambassador to Cyprus by the U.S. Senate on August 2, 2012. Sworn in on August 17, 2012, Koenig presented his credentials to Cypriot president Demetris Christofias on September 12, 2012. The assignment ended when he was replaced by Kathleen A. Doherty on October 7, 2015.

Diplomatic posts
Preceded by Frank Urbancic	United States Ambassador to Cyprus; 2012–2015	Succeeded by Kathleen Doherty
