= James R. Bullington =

American diplomat and ambassador to Burundi (born 1940)

United States Ambassador to Burundi
- In office March 13, 1983 – July 11, 1986
- President: Ronald Reagan
- Preceded by: Frances D. Cook
- Succeeded by: James Daniel Phillips

Personal details
- Born: James R. Bullington; October 27, 1940 (age 86) Chattanooga, Tennessee, U.S.
- Spouse: Tuy Cam
- Education: Auburn University; Harvard University

James Richard Bullington (born October 27, 1940) is an American retired diplomat who served as the U.S. Ambassador to Burundi.

== Early life ==
Bullington was born on October 27, 1940, and is a native of Tennessee. He received his bachelor's degree from Auburn University in 1962 where he was a member of Sigma Pi fraternity and editor of the student newspaper, The Plainsman.

As editor of The Plainsman, Bullington wrote an editorial in 1961 condemning attacks in Alabama on the "Freedom Riders" and calling for desegregation at Auburn University. The editorial provoked a Ku Klux Klan cross-burning at his fraternity house as well as criticism from the Governor of Alabama, John Patterson, who threatened to cut Auburn's appropriations if Bullington were not removed as editor. The editorial and cross-burning were widely covered in the regional and national press. The American Association of University Professors stepped in to intervene on Bullington's behalf, and he continued as editor for his full one-year term.

== Vietnam ==
Bullington's early career focused on the war in Vietnam. From 1965 to 1966 he was the Vice Consul at the consulate in Huế. In May 1966 the consulate was attacked and burned by a mob. His actions during the event earned him the State Department's Superior Honor Award.

After the events in Hue he became the aide to U.S. Ambassador to Vietnam, Henry Cabot Lodge Jr, at the U.S. Embassy in Saigon.

From 1967 to 1968 he was assigned to Quảng Trị Province to work with CORDS, the joint civil-military counterinsurgency program.

During the 1968 Tet Offensive Bullington was trapped behind enemy lines in Hue and disguised himself as a French priest to escape. His experience has been chronicled in several books and articles, most notably in Mark Bowden's Hue 1968: A Turning Point of the American War in Vietnam.

Bullington earned his Masters in Public Administration degree from Harvard University in 1969.

From 1969 to 1970 he was assigned to Washington D.C. as a Political Analyst for Vietnam for the Bureau of Intelligence and Research at the Department of State and detailed to the National Security Council Staff as a member of the Vietnam Special Studies Group. In 1971-73 he was Deputy Principal Officer at the U.S. Consulate in Chiangmai, Thailand. From 1973 to 1975 he was the Chief Political Officer for the State Department's Vietnam Working Group, service for which he was awarded his second Superior Honor Award.

== Mid career ==
Bullington was assigned as Consul in Mandalay, Burma, in 1975–76, and then to Rangoon, Burma from 1976 to 1978 as the Counselor for Political and Economic Affairs for the U.S. Embassy. In 1978–79, he was a student at the U.S. Army War College. From 1979 to 1980 he was the deputy chief of mission at the U.S. Embassy in N’Djamena, Chad. He was awarded his third Superior Honor Award in 1980 when he led the evacuation of Americans (while under fire) from Chad during the civil war. Later that year he was moved to Cotonou, Benin where he was permanent charge d'affaires and chief of mission. In 1982 he became Senior Advisor on African Affairs to the U.S. delegation at the United Nations.

== Ambassador ==
Bullington was appointed Ambassador to Burundi in 1983 by President Ronald Reagan. He held the post until 1986. From 1986 until his retirement in 1989 he was the State Department's Senior Seminar Dean.

== Retirement ==
After retiring from 27 years in the U.S. Foreign Service, in 1989 Bullington became Director of International Affairs for Dallas, TX, and in 1993 he became Director for the Center for Global Business and a professor at Old Dominion University. He next served as country director for Peace Corps in Niger, 2000–2006. He came out of retirement in 2012–2014 to lead a State Department "expeditionary diplomacy" effort to help resolve the long-running Casamance conflict in Senegal. He published an autobiographical memoir in 2017: Global Adventures on Less-Traveled Roads: A Foreign Service Memoir. His other books are: Adventures in Service with Peace Corps in Niger, 2007, and Expeditionary Diplomacy in Action: Supporting the Casamance Peace Initiative, 2015. Ambassador Bullington received a Lifetime Achievement Award from his alma mater, Auburn University, in February 2022.

Diplomatic posts
Preceded by Frances D. Cook	United States Ambassador to Burundi; 1983–1986	Succeeded by James Daniel Phillips
