= Kathleen A. Doherty =

American diplomat (born 1963)

Kathleen Doherty
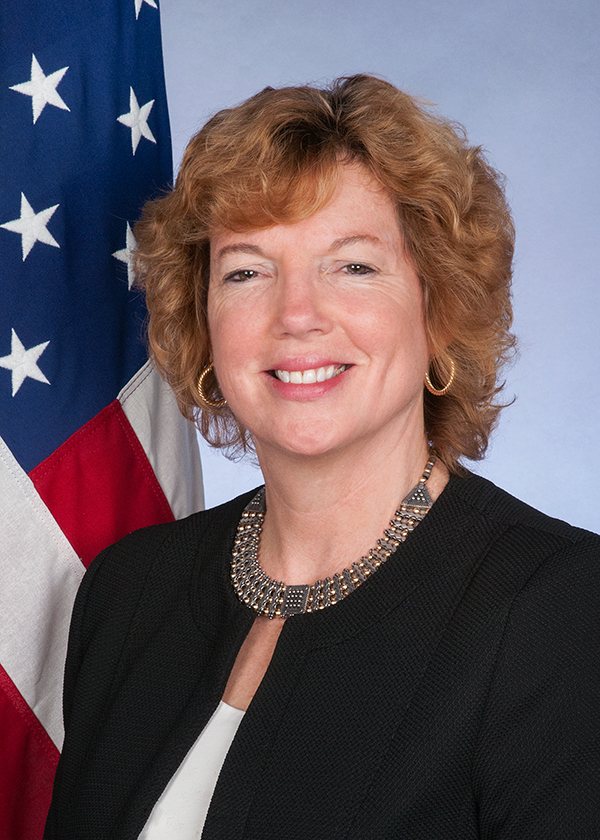

United States Ambassador to Cyprus
- In office October 7, 2015 – January 31, 2019
- President: Barack Obama; Donald Trump
- Preceded by: John Koenig
- Succeeded by: Judith G. Garber

Personal details
- Born: 1963 (age 62–63)
- Education: Colgate University; London School of Economics

Kathleen Ann Doherty (born 1963) is an American diplomat and former Ambassador of the United States of America to Cyprus.

== Early life and education ==
Doherty is the daughter of an immigrant from Ireland, and in her childhood her family often travelled back to Ireland. When she was growing up in New York City, her family regularly read the New York Times and argued various positions, which sparked her interest in politics. Doherty earned a Bachelor of Arts in political science from Colgate University in Hamilton, New York in 1985. During her junior year of college, Doherty participated in the Washington, D.C., Study Group and moved there after college graduation. She later moved to London, where she received a Master of Science in Comparative Political Systems from the London School of Economics in 1990. As part of her masters program, she studied Eastern Europe and communism, particularly Hungary and East Germany, including the fall of the Berlin Wall. The experience motivated her to pursue a career in the Foreign Service.

== Career ==
Doherty was a journalist from 1985 to 1989, writing for American Banker, The Potomac News, The Washington Post, Business and Health Magazine and The Naisbitt Group. As a career member of the U.S. Foreign Service, she held a variety of positions before being nominated to become the U.S. Ambassador to Cyprus. She served as Consular Officer at the U.S. Embassy in the Dominican Republic from 1990 to 1992, and Economic Officer at the Consulate in São Paulo, Brazil from 1992 to 1994. She was Economic Officer at the Office of International Finance and Development from 1996 to 1998. She served in the Bureau of European and Eurasian Affairs and held assignments in London, Rome, and Moscow. From September 2013 to September 2015 Ms. Doherty was the Deputy Chief of Mission (DCM) to the U.S. Mission to Italy.

Doherty was nominated by US President Barack Obama on March 25, 2015, for the position of U.S. Ambassador to Cyprus to replace John Koenig. Her nomination was approved and she presented her credentials on Oct. 7, 2015 to President Nicos Anastasiades.

== Personal ==
In addition to English, Doherty speaks Italian, Russian, Spanish and Portuguese.

Diplomatic posts
Preceded by John Koenig	United States Ambassador to Cyprus; 2015–2019	Succeeded by Judith G. Garber
