= Fraser Wilkins =

American diplomat

4th Inspector General of the Department of State
- In office July 23, 1964 – August 8, 1971
- President: Lyndon B. Johnson; Richard Nixon
- Preceded by: Norris Haselton
- Succeeded by: Thomas McElhiney

United States Ambassador to Cyprus
- In office September 19, 1960 – April 6, 1964
- President: Dwight D. Eisenhower; John F. Kennedy; Lyndon B. Johnson
- Preceded by: Position established
- Succeeded by: Taylor G. Belcher

Personal details
- Born: August 30, 1908 Omaha, Nebraska, U.S.
- Died: January 21, 1989 (aged 80) Washington, D.C., U.S.
- Spouse: Anne Bryan
- Children: 1
- Education: Yale University (BA)

Fraser Wilkins (August 30, 1908 – January 21, 1989) was appointed the first United States ambassador to Cyprus after the country gained independence from the UK.

== Personal life ==
Fraser Wilkins was born in Omaha, Nebraska, to Harry F. Wilkins and his wife. He graduated from Yale University. He married Anne Bryan, and they had one son, Fraser Bryan Wilkins.

== Career ==
Wilkins entered the Foreign Service in 1940. He served in various positions as a US Foreign Service Officer. He was director of the Bureau of Near Eastern Affairs in the Department of State from 1955–1957, and during these years, he was stationed in Iraq, Morocco, India, and Iran. He then served as a minister-counselor in the US embassy in Tehran, Iran, from 1957–1960.

Wilkins was appointed the first ambassador to Cyprus in 1960. He served in this position until 1964. During his time as the US ambassador to Cyprus, there were tensions in the country between the Greek and Turkish Cypriots. The US embassy in Nicosia was bombed in February 1964. Following the two-bomb explosions, Wilkins went to the Presidential Palace to protest what happened, and he also oversaw the evacuation of American civilians from the country. He told the President of Cyprus, Archbishop Makarios III, that he was not confident Cypriot police could adequately protect the American civilians.

After he resigned as the US ambassador to Cyprus in 1964, the White House announced that Wilkins would be returning to Washington, D.C., to await appointment to another position. That same year, Wilkins was named inspector-general of the United States Foreign Service, and he served in this position until 1971.

== Death ==
Wilkins died of a stroke in Sibley Memorial Hospital in Washington, D.C., on January 21, 1989, at the age of 80.

Diplomatic posts
New office	United States Ambassador to Cyprus; 1960–1964	Succeeded by Taylor G. Belcher
