= Gary A. Grappo =

American diplomat

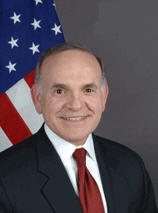

United States Ambassador to Oman
- In office September 17, 2006 – June 1, 2009
- President: George W. Bush
- Preceded by: Richard L. Baltimore
- Succeeded by: Richard J. Schmierer

Personal details
- Born: Gary Anthony Grappo; 1950 (age 75–76)
- Education: United States Air Force Academy; Purdue University; Stanford University Graduate School of Business

Gary Anthony Grappo (born 1950) was the United States Ambassador to Oman from September 17, 2006, to June 1, 2009. Prior to becoming ambassador, Grappo was Deputy Chief of Mission and Minister Counselor of the United States Mission in Riyadh, Saudi Arabia. He is currently a Distinguished Fellow at the Korbel School for International Studies at the University of Denver.

Grappo holds a BS in Mathematics from the United States Air Force Academy (1972), an MS in Geodesy and Survey Engineering from Purdue University, and an MBA from the Stanford University Graduate School of Business.

Diplomatic posts
| Preceded by Richard L. Baltimore | United States Ambassador to Oman; September 17, 2006 – June 1, 2009 | Succeeded by Richard J. Schmierer |
