= Rodger Davies =

American diplomat (1921–1974)

Rodger Paul Davies
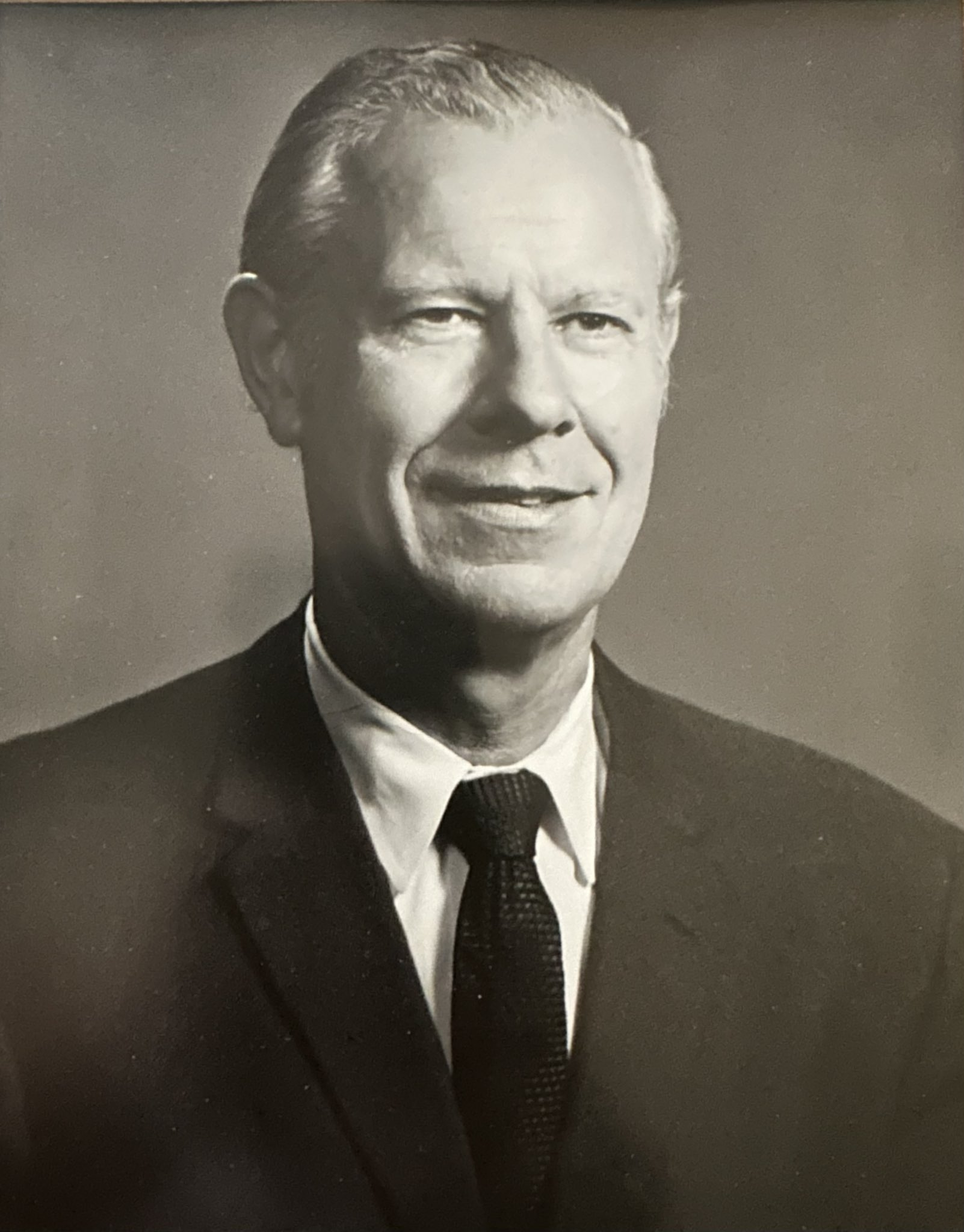

United States Ambassador to Cyprus
- In office July 10, 1974 – August 19, 1974
- President: Richard Nixon; Gerald Ford
- Preceded by: Robert J. McCloskey
- Succeeded by: William R. Crawford Jr.

Personal details
- Born: May 7, 1921 Berkeley, California, U.S.
- Died: August 19, 1974 (aged 53) Nicosia, Cyprus
- Education: University of California, Berkeley; Princeton University
- Profession: Diplomat, soldier

Rodger Paul Davies (May 7, 1921 – August 19, 1974) was an American diplomat who served as the ambassador to Cyprus. He was killed by a sniper during an anti-American riot outside the U.S. Embassy in Nicosia, allegedly by Greek Cypriot gunmen.

He studied Economics at the University of California, Berkeley, before joining the U.S. Army in World War II. He undertook intensive language training in Arabic under Philip Khuri Hitti at Princeton University as part of the Army Specialized Training Program, was promoted to the rank of Lieutenant, and then was deployed to the Middle East. He joined the state department after WWII.

== Career ==
Davies was an American diplomat whose roles included director of the United States Department of State's Bureau of Near Eastern Affairs until October 1965. Then until 1970 he was Deputy Assistant Secretary of State for Near Eastern and South Asian Affairs. After Davies's death, President Ford appointed William R. Crawford Jr., as his successor.

Davies had been serving as the United States Ambassador to Cyprus since May 1973. It is alleged he was killed by Greek Cypriot gunmen during an anti-American demonstration outside the U.S. Embassy in Nicosia, where an estimated 300–600 Greek Cypriots were "demonstrating against the U.S.’s failure" to stop the Turkish invasion of Cyprus, which they perceived as the United States siding with Turkey.

== Death ==
Davies and Antoinette Varnavas, an embassy secretary and a Greek Cypriot national, were killed by sniper fire from a nearby building, believed to be gunmen from EOKA-B, a Greek Cypriot nationalist paramilitary organization, although this was never proven. Afterwards, the U.S. government "immediately" sent his replacement, Ambassador to Yemen William R. Crawford Jr., in order to demonstrate that "it was not blaming Greek-Cypriot authorities for the murder".

== Personal life ==
Davies was born in Berkeley, California, on May 7, 1921 to John Leslie Davies and Catherine Paul Davies. He had an older brother, John Arthur Davies, and a younger sister, Catherine Davies Frakes. He studied Economics at the University of California, Berkeley, before joining the U.S. Army in World War II. He was married to Sarah Burgess. She died in 1973, the year before he was killed. They had a daughter, Dana, and a son, John, who were 20 and 15 years old, respectively at the time of Davies's death.

== See also ==
- Cleo A. Noel Jr., the previous U.S. ambassador to die in the line of duty
- Francis E. Meloy Jr., the next U.S. ambassador to die in the line of duty
- List of U.S. ambassadors killed in office

Diplomatic posts
Preceded by Robert J. McCloskey	United States Ambassador to Cyprus; 1974	Succeeded by William R. Crawford Jr.
