= Ana A. Escrogima =

American diplomat

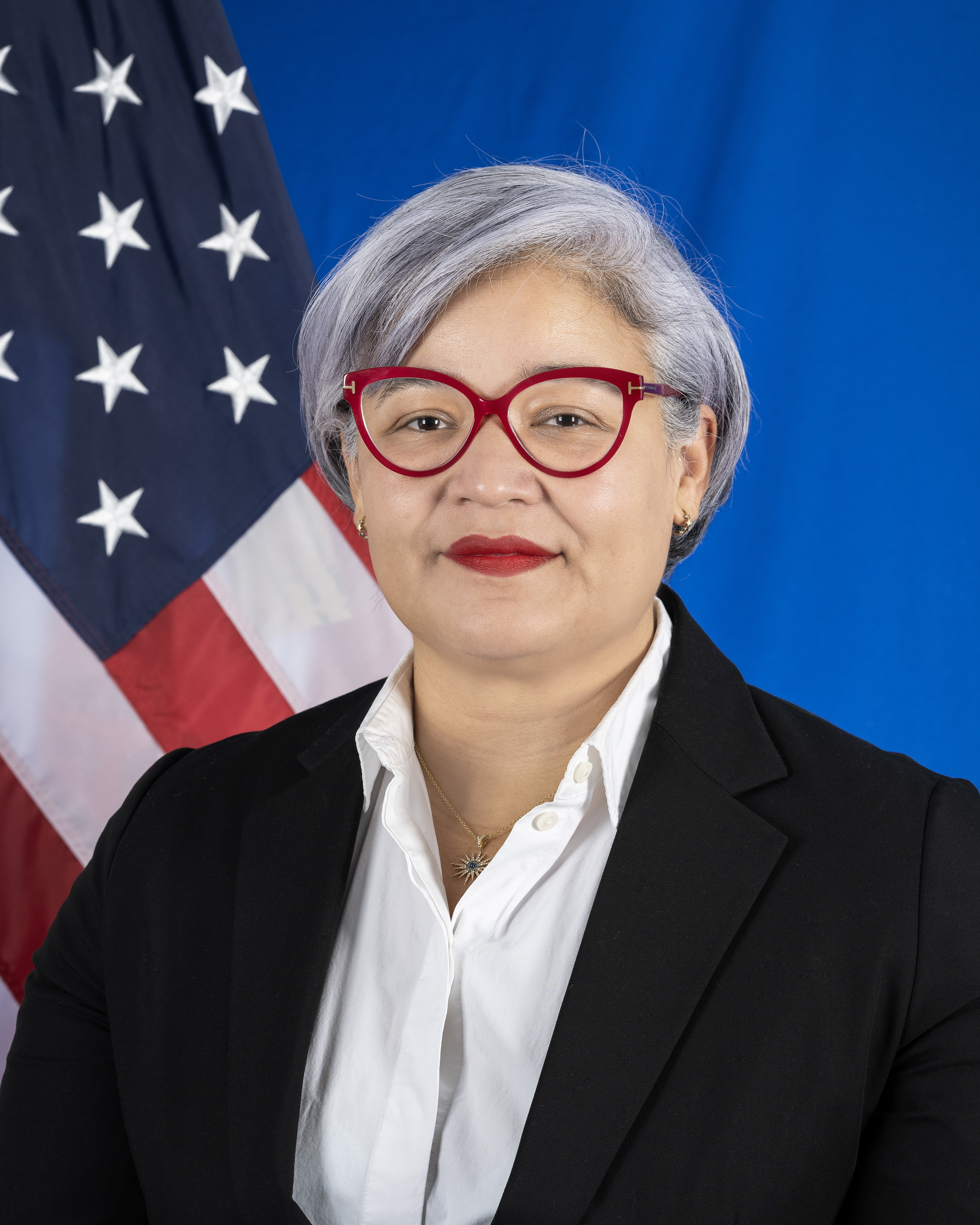

United States Ambassador to Oman
- Incumbent
- Assumed office December 4, 2023
- President: Joe Biden; Donald Trump
- Preceded by: Leslie Tsou

Personal details
- Education: Brown University (BA); Columbia University (MA)

Ana A. Escrogima is an American diplomat who has served as the US ambassador to Oman since 2023.

== Early life and education ==
Escrogima earned a Bachelor of Arts in international relations from Brown University, graduating in 2001. At her graduation, Escrogima served as one of two senior orators, delivering a speech entitled "The Enriquillo Dilemma as an Approach to Leadership."

Escrogima was a 1999 Thomas R. Pickering Foreign Affairs Fellow. She earned a Master of Arts degree from Columbia University's School of International and Public Affairs. She also received an International Studies Certificate from l'Institut d’Études Politiques in Paris, France.

== Career ==
Escrogima is a career member of the Senior Foreign Service, with the rank of Counselor. She currently serves as Consul General of the U.S. Consulate General in Montreal, Canada. Escrogima was previously the Director of the Regional and Multilateral Affairs Office in the Bureau of Near Eastern Affairs within the United States Department of State. She also served as Deputy Chief of Mission of the Yemen Affairs Unit in Riyadh, Saudi Arabia, as well as the Public Affairs Officer at the U.S. Embassy in Algiers, Algeria, and as the Deputy Director for Syria, in the Near Eastern Affairs Bureau. Escrogima has also served at the State Department as Special Assistant to the Under Secretary for Political Affairs, as Deputy Director of the Near Eastern Affairs Bureau in the Office of Press and Public Diplomacy, and as the Arabic Language Spokesperson at the Arabic Regional Media Hub in Dubai, UAE.

=== United States ambassador to Oman ===
On January 3, 2023, President Joe Biden nominated Escrogima to serve as the next ambassador to Oman. Hearings on her nomination were held before the Senate Foreign Relations Committee on May 16, 2023. The committee favorably reported the nomination on June 1, 2023. Her nomination was confirmed the full United States Senate via voice vote on October 17, 2023. She was sworn into office on 13 November 2023. She arrived in Oman on 29 November 2023. She presented her credentials to Foreign Minister Badr bin Hamad Al Busaidi on 4 December 2023.

== Personal life ==
Escrogima speaks Arabic, Spanish and French. She is of Dominican heritage.
