= David M. Friedman =

American attorney & diplomat (born 1958)

David Friedman
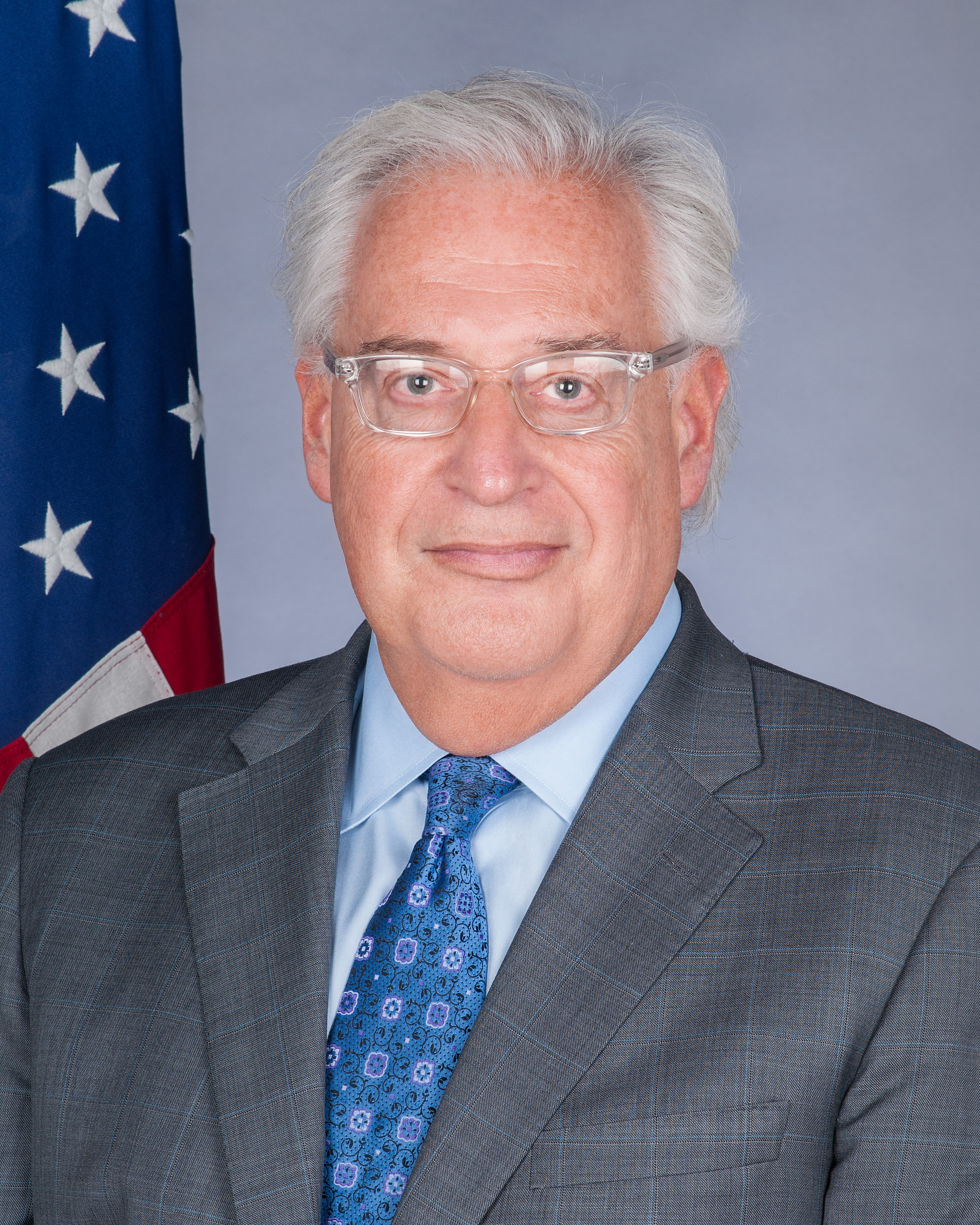

United States Ambassador to Israel
- In office May 15, 2017 – January 20, 2021
- President: Donald Trump
- Preceded by: Dan Shapiro
- Succeeded by: Thomas R. Nides

Personal details
- Born: David Melech Friedman; August 8, 1958 (age 68)
- Party: Republican
- Spouse: Tammy Sand (m. 1981)
- Children: 5
- Education: Columbia University (BA); New York University (JD)

David Melech Friedman (born August 8, 1958) is an American lawyer and diplomat who served as United States Ambassador to Israel from 2017 to 2021. He joined the law firm Kasowitz, Benson, Torres & Friedman (then known as Kasowitz, Hoff, Benson & Torres) in 1994, where he met and represented Donald Trump, then chairman and president of The Trump Organization.

He was an advisor to Trump during his successful presidential campaign. In December 2016, President-elect Trump's transition team announced that Friedman was Trump's nominee for ambassador. He was narrowly confirmed by the Senate, officially sworn in by Vice President Mike Pence on March 29 and presented his credentials on May 15.

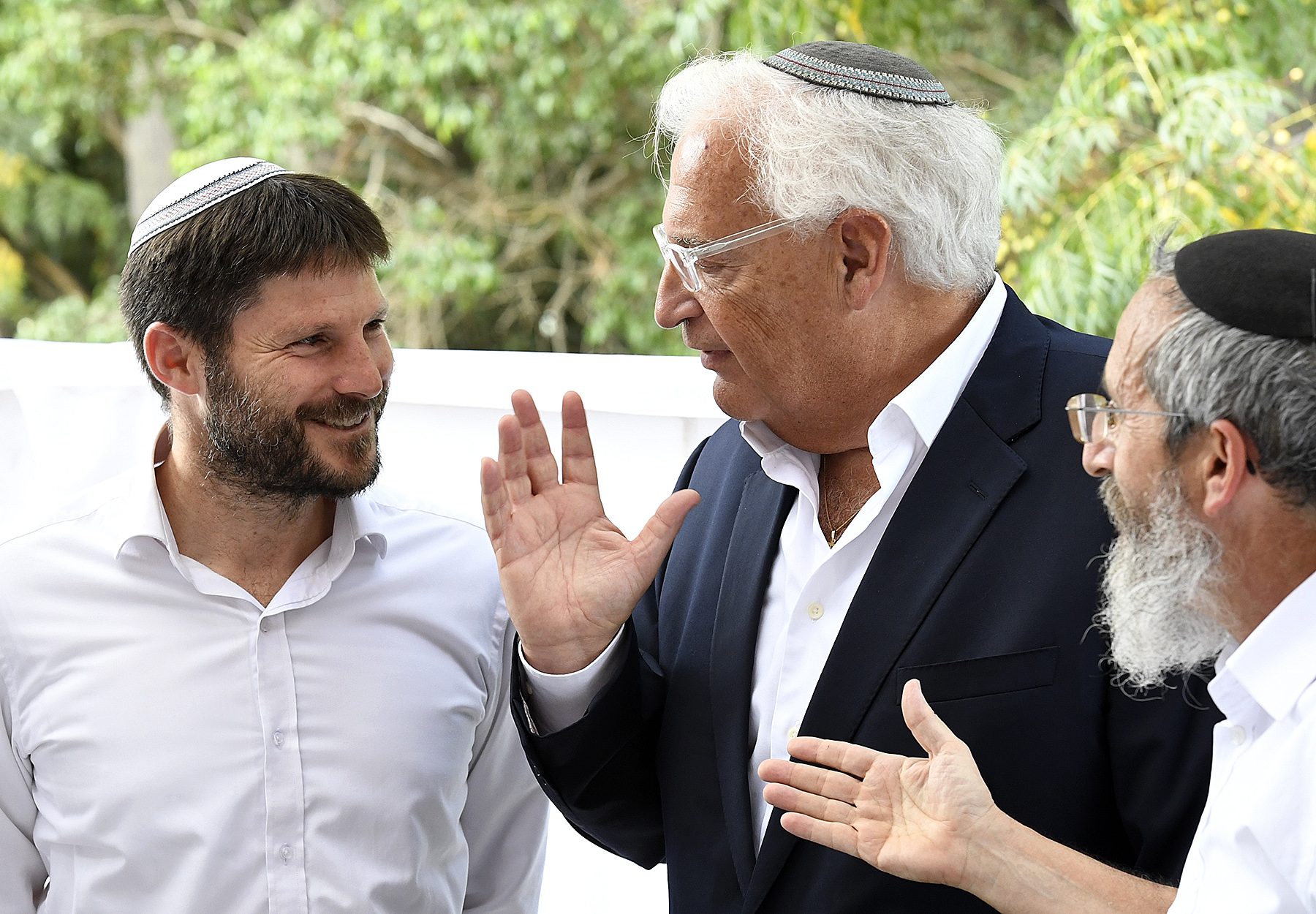
Friedman with Israeli politician Bezalel Smotrich

== Early life and education ==
Friedman was one of three children born to Morris S. Friedman (d. 2005), a rabbi, and Addi Friedman, a high school English teacher. He grew up in North Woodmere, New York. His father was the rabbi of Temple Hillel, a Conservative synagogue in North Woodmere, and served as the head of the New York Board of Rabbis.

He graduated from the Hebrew Academy of Nassau County (HANC) high school in 1974, and earned his B.A. degree in anthropology from Columbia University, graduating in 1978, and his J.D. degree from New York University School of Law, graduating in 1981. He has been a member of the New York State Bar Association since 1982.

== Legal and philanthropic career ==
In 1994, he left the now-defunct law firm Mudge Rose Guthrie Alexander & Ferdon to form the bankruptcy practice at Kasowitz, Hoff, Benson & Torres. Friedman was promoted to name partner in 1995, and the firm was renamed Kasowitz, Benson, Torres & Friedman. As the head of the creditors' rights and bankruptcy practice group, Friedman advised and represented Donald Trump and The Trump Organization in bankruptcies involving his Atlantic City casinos.

Friedman volunteered to head American Friends of Bet El Institutions, an organization that advocates against a two-state solution to the Israeli–Palestinian conflict and provides around $2 million (~$3.63 million in 2025) per year to the Israeli settlement Bet El. The organization also received donations from the family foundation of Jared Kushner, Trump's son-in-law. In 1999, Friedman dedicated the Friedman Faculty House. The settlement runs the Israeli news website Arutz Sheva, where Friedman was a columnist. In his writings and statements, Friedman repeatedly argued in support of Israeli settlements, declaring them legal. He has also contributed to United Hatzalah ("united rescue"), an Israeli organization that provides emergency medical services, and Aleh Negev, a village for disabled Bedouin and Jewish people in southern Israel.

== Donald Trump's 2016 presidential campaign ==
Friedman advised Trump on Israel- and Jewish-related issues during his presidential campaign, co-chairing Trump's Israel Advisory Committee along with Jason D. Greenblatt, an executive vice president for The Trump Organization. During the presidential election, he donated a total of $50,000 to the Trump campaign and the Republican National Committee. Four days prior to the election, Friedman and Greenblatt released a joint statement promising to move the U.S. embassy in Tel Aviv to Jerusalem, one of Trump's campaign promises. Other presidential candidates, including Bill Clinton, George W. Bush, and Hillary Clinton, had also promised to move the embassy to Jerusalem during their campaigns. Moving the embassy would be a significant departure from U.S. policy. Since the end of the Six-Day War in 1967, the U.S. officially maintained that Jerusalem's final status should be decided by direct negotiations between the Israelis and the Palestinians; it did not recognize Jerusalem as Israeli territory. Relocation would be in accordance with the Jerusalem Embassy Act, passed by Congress in 1995, which required moving the embassy from Tel Aviv to Jerusalem by May 31, 1999. The executive branch has consistently waived implementation of the act, arguing it would have a negative impact on national security. On June 1, 2017, in accordance with his predecessors, President Trump signed an executive order keeping the embassy in Tel Aviv instead of relocating it to Jerusalem. However, on December 6, 2017, President Trump reversed course and issued a "Presidential Proclamation Recognizing Jerusalem as the Capital of the State of Israel and Relocating the United States Embassy to Israel to Jerusalem."

== Nomination for U.S. Ambassador to Israel ==
=== Reactions ===
On December 15, 2016, the transition team of President-elect Donald Trump announced that Friedman had been selected to be the nominee as the United States Ambassador to Israel. Friedman's nomination was controversial; some American Jewish, Israeli, and Palestinian individuals and advocacy groups argued against his nomination. Saeb Erekat, chief negotiator for the Palestinian Authority, said that moving the U.S. embassy to Jerusalem and annexing West Bank settlements would lead to the "destruction of the peace process" and send the region down a path of "chaos, lawlessness, and extremism". Friedman had said in an interview for Haaretz during the campaign that Trump would be open to Israel annexing parts of the West Bank. The U.S. has opposed Israeli settlements in the West Bank since 1967.

The liberal advocacy organization J Street "vehemently opposed" Friedman's nomination. During the presidential campaign, Friedman had attacked J Street supporters, writing in Arutz Sheva in May 2016:

Are J Street supporters really as bad as kapos? The answer, actually, is no. They are far worse than kapos—Jews who turned in their fellow Jews in the Nazi death camps. The kapos faced extraordinary cruelty and who knows what any of us would have done under those circumstances to save a loved one? But J Street? They are just smug advocates of Israel's destruction delivered from the comfort of their secure American sofas—it's hard to imagine anyone worse.

When asked about his comments on J Street at the Saban Forum in early December, Friedman had stood by his statements, saying that J Street supporters were "not Jewish, and they're not pro-Israel". The advocacy organizations Americans for Peace Now, Ameinu, the Israel Policy Forum, and the New Israel Fund also opposed the nomination. Six Democratic members of the House of Representatives, including Jewish representatives Jan Schakowsky, Jerrold Nadler, John Yarmuth, and Steve Cohen, urged their colleagues in the Senate to vote against Friedman.

Five former United States Ambassadors to Israel – Thomas Pickering, William Harrop, Edward Walker Jr., Daniel Kurtzer, and James Cunningham – signed a letter declaring Friedman unqualified.

Other Jewish and Israeli groups and individuals supported Friedman's nomination. Nathan Diament, executive director for public policy at the Orthodox Union, commended Trump for the nomination as a change in the relationship between Israel and the United States from the relationship under the Obama administration. Morton Klein, president of the Zionist Organization of America, said Friedman "has the potential to be the greatest US Ambassador to Israel ever". The Republican Jewish Coalition and Rabbi Yechiel Eckstein, founder and president of the International Fellowship of Christians and Jews, both supported the nomination. Israeli politicians Tzipi Hotovely, the Deputy Minister of Foreign Affairs, Dani Dayan, the Consul General of Israel in New York, and Minister of Education Naftali Bennett all praised Friedman and welcomed his nomination. The Yesha Council, the umbrella organization governing West Bank settlements, also supported the nomination, saying Friedman had a "deep love for all of the land and people of Israel, including those in Judea and Samaria," referring to the Israeli-occupied West Bank as "Judea and Samaria".

=== Senate confirmation ===
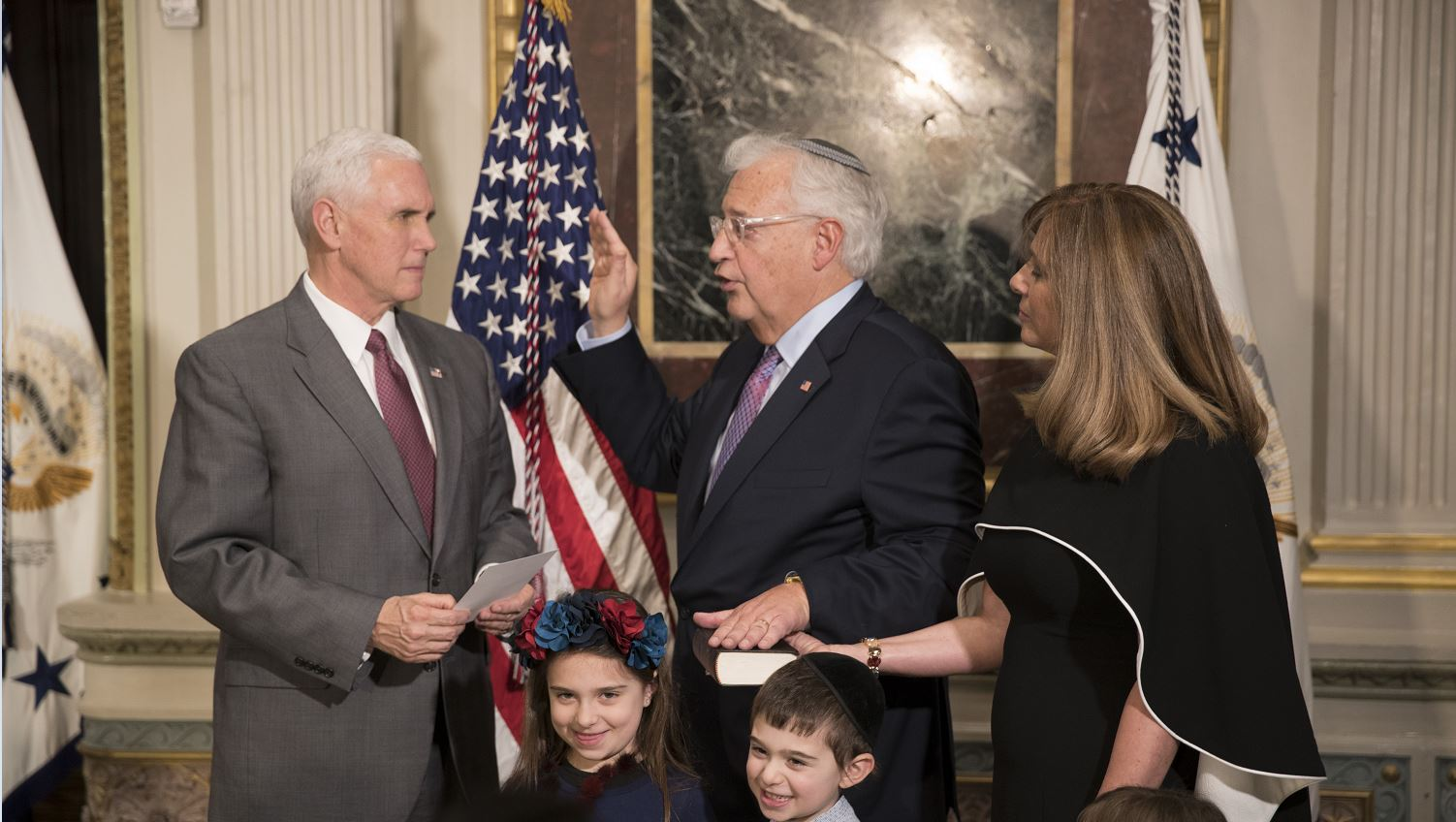
David Friedman is sworn in by Vice President Mike Pence.

Friedman's confirmation hearing was held on February 16, 2017. The hearing was contentious; protesters from Americans Muslims for Palestine and the Jewish group IfNotNow were arrested after interrupting the proceedings several times. Friedman said he believed a two-state solution is the best way to resolve the conflict. He had previously questioned the need for it, stating as a representative for the Trump campaign, "a two-state solution is not a priority ... A two-state solution is a way, but it's not the only way." He had also called it a "scam" and a "damaging anachronism" in a February 2016 column for Arutz Sheva. He also agreed to sell off his business interests in the region and end his support for the expansion of Israeli settlements. He apologized for his past language towards J Street, maintaining his differences of opinion with the organization. Yael Patir, the Israel director of J Street, did not accept the apology.

Several Democratic members of the Senate Foreign Relations Committee criticized Friedman's fitness for the position, while the Republican members generally expressed their support. On March 9, 2017, the Senate Foreign Relations Committee approved his nomination in a 12–9 vote. All Republicans voted in favor, along with Democrat Bob Menendez from New Jersey. Friedman was officially confirmed on March 23. All Democratic and independent senators except Bob Menendez and Joe Manchin, from West Virginia, voted against him. 50 out of 52 Republican senators voted for him; two Republicans did not vote. The Washington Post reported that this "sharply partisan vote was a notable departure from past votes to confirm ambassadors to Israel."

On March 29, Vice President Mike Pence officially administered the oath of office, swearing in Friedman. He succeeded Leslie Tsou, who served as the interim chargé d'affaires after Daniel Shapiro left the position on January 20.

== Ambassadorship ==
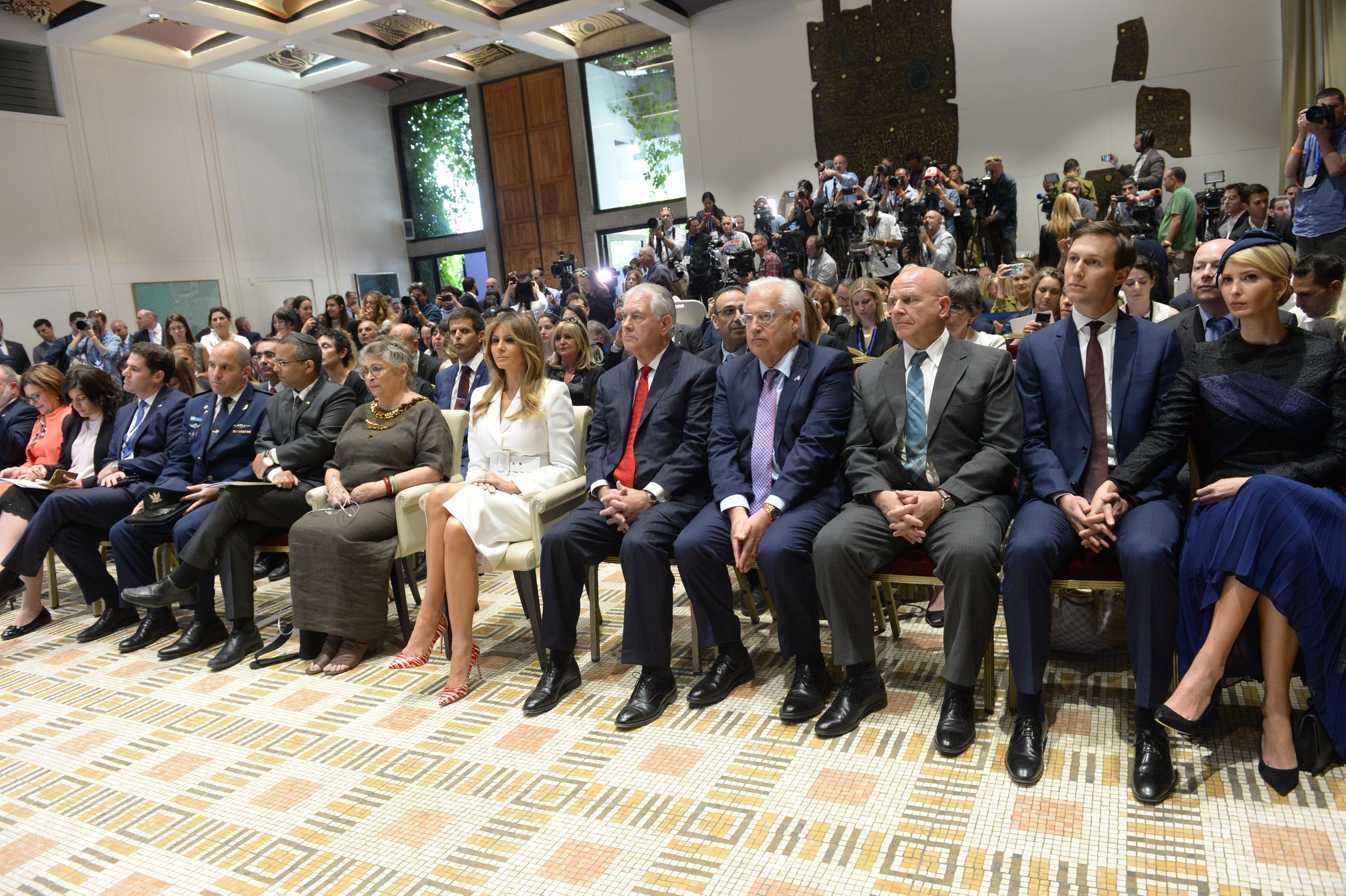
David Friedman, fourth from right in the front row of an assembly at the Beit HaNassi (the President's Residence of Israel), during Donald Trump's visit to Israel, May 2017

Friedman became the U.S. ambassador to Israel on May 15, 2017, when he presented his credentials to Israeli President Reuven Rivlin. In 2019, The Jerusalem Post listed him as one of the world's 50 most influential Jews.

The New York Times in January 2021 described Friedman "as one of America’s most influential envoys" and as someone "who drove the radical overhaul of White House policy toward the Israeli-Palestinian conflict."

In 2019, at a time when Israel's Prime Minister Netanyahu had made campaign promises to annex the West Bank, Friedman said "I think Israel has the right to retain some, but unlikely all, of the West Bank". He also declined to say how the US might respond if Israel unilaterally took such an action.

For his work negotiating the Abraham Accords, Friedman was nominated alongside Jared Kushner for the 2020 Nobel Peace Prize. The nomination, submitted by Alan Dershowitz, also names Kushner's aide Avi Berkowitz, and Friedman's counterpart Israeli Ambassador Ron Dermer.

== Post-Ambassador career ==
After his term of ambassadorship was completed, Friedman launched the Friedman Center for Peace through Strength which seeks to continue the inroads made by the Abraham Accords. An opening event was held in 2021 at the Museum of Tolerance in Jerusalem where the center is located.

In 2022 Friedman released the memoir Sledgehammer: How Breaking with the Past Brought Peace to the Middle East. In it he describes his journey to becoming ambassador and how the Abraham Accords came about. Bookscan sales indicated it sold more in its first week of release then any other Israel-related book in the past ten years according to vice president of the publisher Broadside books Eric Nelson.

When Trump received Kanye West and white supremacist Nick Fuentes at Mar-a-Lago in November 2022, Friedman tweeted: “Even a social visit from an antisemite like Kanye West and human scum like Nick Fuentes is unacceptable. I urge you to throw those bums out, disavow them and relegate them to the dustbin of history where they belong.”

On June 13, 2023, Friedman endorsed Trump for President.

Alongside Mike Pompeo, Friedman featured in the 2023 documentary Route 60: The Biblical Highway, directed by Matt Crouch.

In June 2024, Friedman published One Jewish State: The Last, Best Hope to Resolve the Israeli-Palestinian Conflict, with a foreword by Mike Pompeo. The book outlines his response to the two-state solution and proposes a variant of the one-state solution as a more viable alternative for resolving the conflict. The book presented a more detailed plan for annexing Palestinian territories, which he said would improve the lives of Palestinians living under Israeli control.

On October 13, 2025, Friedman and current US Ambassador to Israel Mike Huckabee performed a rendition of Lynyrd Skynyrd's hit song Sweet Home Alabama in Jerusalem but with changed lyrics that promote Zionism and the city itself. Friedman played guitar while Huckabee played bass.

In November 2025, Friedman was named executive chairman of Israeli cyber-intelligence firm NSO Group, well-known for developing the spyware tool Pegasus.

== Personal life ==
Friedman is an Orthodox Jew and is fluent in Hebrew. He has been married to his wife, Tammy Deborah Sand, since 1981. They have five children and seven grandchildren. Friedman's daughter, Talia Friedman, immigrated to Israel and officially became an Israeli citizen on August 15, 2017. In 1984, Friedman met President Ronald Reagan when Reagan visited Temple Hillel and became the first sitting president since George Washington to visit a synagogue. Friedman became friends with Donald Trump in 2005, after Trump paid him a condolence call during shiva for his father.

Diplomatic posts
Preceded by Dan Shapiro	United States Ambassador to Israel; 2017–2021	Succeeded by Jonathan Shrier; Chargé d'Affaires
