= Richard Schmierer =

American diplomat (born 1950)

Richard J. Schmierer
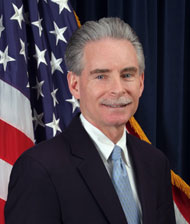

United States Ambassador to Oman
- In office August 20, 2009 – August 3, 2012
- President: Barack Obama
- Preceded by: Gary A. Grappo
- Succeeded by: Greta C. Holtz

Personal details
- Born: 1950 (age 75–76) New Jersey, U.S.
- Spouse: Sandra Schmierer
- Education: Lehigh University (BA); University of Massachusetts Amherst (Master’s and Doctoral degrees in Linguistics)

Richard J. Schmierer (born 1950) is a United States diplomat. He served as the United States Ambassador to Oman through August 2012.

== Early life ==
Schmierer was born in the state of New Jersey and graduated from Notre Dame High School in 1968; the school inducted him into its hall of fame in 2015. He graduated from Lehigh University in 1974 and got his Master's and PhD from the University of Massachusetts Amherst in 1975 and 1977, respectively. Schmierer is a career Foreign Service Officer and a member of Senior Foreign Service of the State Department.

== Political career ==
Schmierer started his diplomatic career in 1980 working in the diplomatic mission in Bonn, Frankfurt and Hamburg from 1980 through 1984. He was then enrolled in an Arabic and Middle Eastern Studies program which lasted a year. Following its completion, he served as Public Affairs Officer at the U.S. Consulate in Dhahran, Saudi Arabia. In 1988-1992, Schmierer worked at the headquarters of United States Information Agency, first as the head of the Middle East office of the International Visitor Program, then at the Office of European Affairs. In 1992-1996, he served as the Press Attaché at the U.S. Embassy in Bonn (relocated to Berlin after reunification of Germany), capital of West Germany. In 1996-1997, Schmierer took additional courses on Arabic and Middle Eastern Studies. In 1997, he was assigned to the U.S. Embassy in Riyadh, Saudi Arabia where he served a Counselor for Public Affairs until June 2000. From June 2000 to June 2004, he worked as the Minister-Counselor for Public Affairs at the U.S. Embassy in Berlin. From June 2004 through June 2005, he was the Embassy Counselor for Public Affairs in Baghdad, Iraq. In July 2005, he started teaching at the Institute for the Study of Diplomacy of Edmund A. Walsh School of Foreign Service of Georgetown University in Washington, D.C. His lectures were on politics of Iraq. While at the university, he published a book titled Iraq: Policy and Perceptions. In July 2007, Schmierer was appointed Director of the Office of Iraq Affairs in the Bureau of Near Eastern Affairs at the State Department. In 2008, he was appointed Deputy Assistant Secretary of State for Near Eastern Affairs.

On June 11, 2009, he was appointed United States Ambassador to Oman by President Barack Obama. The Senate confirmed the appointment on July 10, 2009. He was sworn in on August 20, 2009 replacing Gary A. Grappo who had served as Ambassador to Oman since March 6, 2006.

== Personal life ==
Richard Schmierer is married to Sandra (Stanchick) Schmierer, a State Department employee. The couple has one daughter and two sons.

Diplomatic posts
Preceded by Gary A. Grappo	United States Ambassador to Oman; 2009–2012	Succeeded by Greta C. Holtz
