= 1974 anti-American riots in Cyprus =

- Part of the aftermath of the Turkish invasion of Cyprus
- Location: Nicosia, Cyprus
- Date: August 19, 1974
- Attack type: Rioting and shootings
- Deaths: 2
- Injuries: Unknown

The 1974 anti-American riots in Cyprus were violent anti-American rioting that took place in front of the United States embassy in Nicosia, Cyprus on August 19, 1974. The events took place days after the second phase of the Turkish invasion of Cyprus which resulted in Turkey controlling 36.5% of the island. The gunmen murdered the US ambassador in the American embassy in Cyprus.

Hundreds of Greek-Cypriots who were frustrated at the failure of the United States to quell the Turkish forces and its alleged support for Turkey started to protest and riot.

During the riots US Marines from the Marine Security Guard fired teargas and allegedly warning shots at the protestors, the Cypriot National Guard General Staff tried to get a platoon from 35th Raider Squadron to assist, however, the commander, Giorgos Papameletiou refused, stating that it was not the special forces job to protect the embassy rather the military police.

The American ambassador to Cyprus, Rodger Davies, who was seeking shelter inside the embassy, was shot and killed by sharpshooters belonging to EOKA-B, a Greek-Cypriot nationalist paramilitary. from about 91 metres (100 yd) away. An embassy employee, Antoinette Varnava, who rushed to his aid, was also killed by a sniper bullet.

In February 1977, the Cypriot government decided to arrest six EOKA-B members and try them for the assassination of ambassador Davies however never being convicted.
