= Greta C. Holtz =

American diplomat

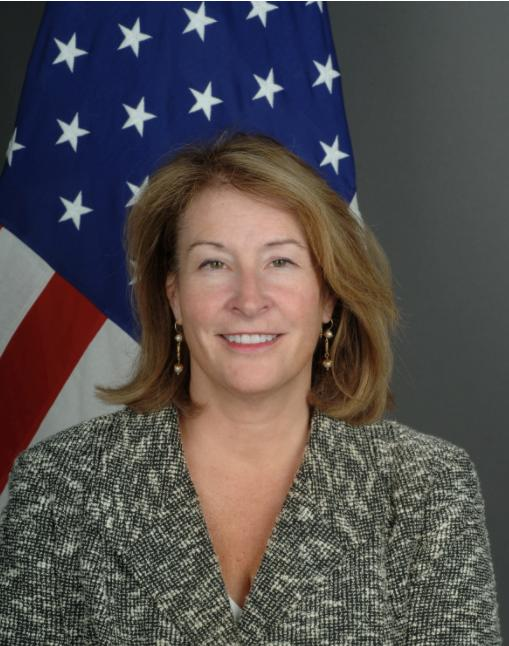

United States Ambassador to Oman
- In office October 9, 2012 – December 7, 2015
- President: Barack Obama
- Preceded by: Richard Schmierer
- Succeeded by: Marc Jonathan Sievers

Personal details
- Education: Vanderbilt University (BS); University of Kentucky (MA); National War College (MS)

Greta C. Holtz is an American career diplomat. She was the U.S. ambassador to Oman (2012–2015). She served as chargé d'affaires of the U.S. Embassy in Doha, Qatar, between June 14, 2020, and June 16, 2022.

== Career ==
Ambassador (ret) Holtz earned a Bachelor of Science in political science from Vanderbilt University, a Master of Arts in international relations from the University of Kentucky’s Patterson School of Diplomacy and International Commerce, and a Master of Science in national security studies from the National War College.

Ambassador (ret) Holtz was the State Department coordinator for the Organization for Security and Cooperation in Europe (2004–2006) and director of the Middle East Partnership Initiative at the State Department from 2006 to 2007.

Holtz was the minister-counselor for provincial affairs at the U.S. Embassy in Baghdad from 2009 to 2010 and was the deputy assistant secretary of state for public diplomacy and strategic communication in the Bureau of Near Eastern Affairs from 2010 to 2012, and served as ambassador to Oman from September 2012 to December 2015.

Ambassador (ret) Holtz was the vice chancellor and chancellor of National Defense University's College of International Security Affairs from 2016 to 2017 and from 2021 to 2023. Ambassador Holtz was the principal deputy assistant secretary for South and Central Asian affairs, from 2019 to 2020 and served as the senior foreign policy advisor to the commander of U.S. Special Operations Command (SOCOM), from 2017 to 2018.

Amb (ret) Holtz was the senior USG coordinator for operation allies refuge in Qatar from August 2021-December 2021.

Ambassador (ret) Holtz is the president and CEO of Amideast, a non-profit that provides education, training, and exchanges in the MENA region.

Holtz speaks Arabic, French and Turkish.
