= IAU College =

Private college in Aix-en-Provence, France

IAU
- Former name: Institute for American Universities
- Motto: "Bevés a la font de la Sapienci"
- Motto in English: "Drink From the Fountain of Knowledge"
- Type: Private, independent, not for profit liberal arts college
- Established: 1957; 69 years ago
- Affiliations: Aix-Marseille University
- President: Carl Jubran, Ph.D.
- Provost: Garett Heysel, Ph.D.
- Students: 1,050
- Location: Aix-en-Provence, France
- Website: www.iau.edu

IAU (IAU, French: Institut Américain Universitaire) is an American institution for higher learning situated in southern France. Its main campus is located in Aix-en-Provence, France, and it operates satellite programs in Spain, Morocco, and Italy. Established in 1957, IAU was known to be among the earliest American-style, English language, liberal arts educational institutions in Western Europe. The institute holds a charter from the Regents of the State University of New York and is recognized by both the Rectorat of Aix-Marseille University and the French Ministry of Education as a private higher education institution. IAU is known for a large presence of study abroad programs in Europe and for an option to offer study abroad options beyond French language studies. In 2015, IAU introduced master's and bachelor's degree programs through its sister institution, the American College of the Mediterranean (ACM).

== History ==
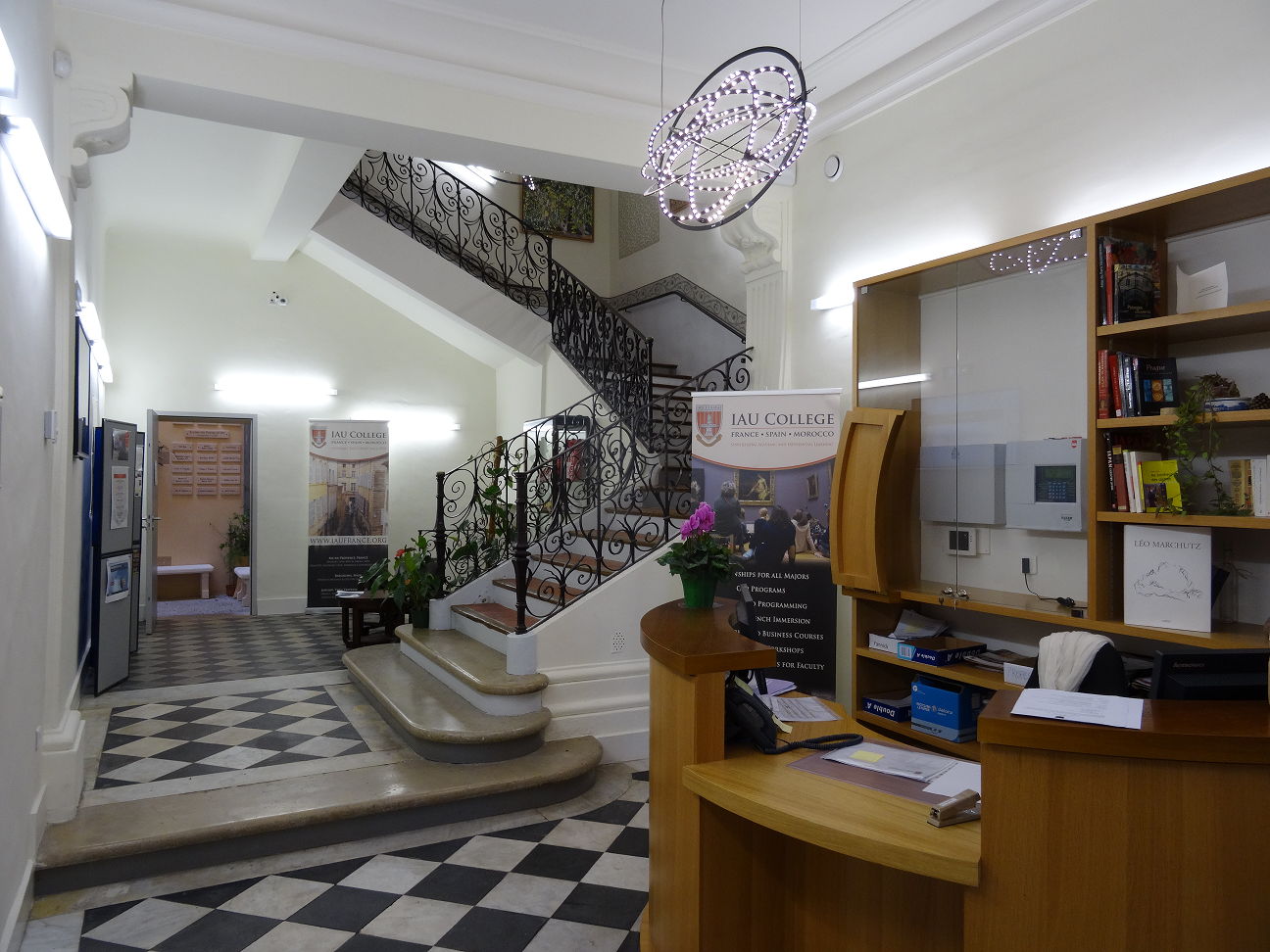
Manning Hall houses IAU's School of Humanities and Social Sciences.

IAU was founded in 1957 by academics and former diplomats, including Herbert Maza who served as its initial President, Evron Kirkpatrick, and Jeane Kirkpatrick. The institution aimed to provide a platform for Americans interested in diplomatic relations and careers in foreign service and the State Department. It was established under the authority of Aix-Marseille University and offered a study abroad program, allowing students to earn transfer credits by living and studying in France for a year. IAU was the pioneering institution offering study abroad programs for students pursuing majors beyond language studies.

By 1966, the Institute had an enrollment of around 150 students, and in 1984 it established a partnership with the Leo Marchutz School of Painting & Drawing (founded by Leo Marchutz in 1972), although the school is no longer affiliated with IAU. Over the years, IAU's program expanded, serving more than 700 colleges and universities as of 2015, with over 25,000 undergraduates having participated, and an annual enrollment exceeding 2,700. In 2026, The Institute for American Universities-American College of the Mediterranean achieved U.S. Accreditation under the New England Commission of Higher Education (NECHE).

== Programs and locations ==
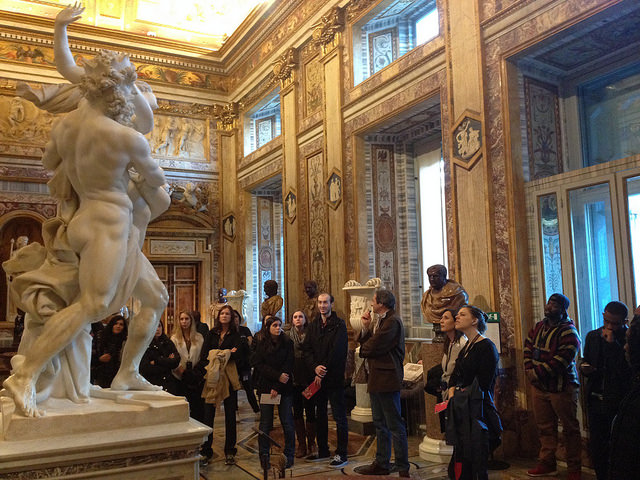
IAU College Dean, Leigh Smith, leads students through the Borghese Gallery in Rome as part of IAU's January Term/Intersession programs.

IAU operates its main campus in Aix-en-Provence, situated in the southern region of France. The programs of study at this campus are offered in both French and English. This campus hosts the School of Humanities and Social Sciences, the ACM School of Art, the Donna Dillon Manning School of Global Affairs, and the Centre d'Etudes Françaises. Additionally, IAU offers French language studies at its Paris campus, which is located at the Université de Paris-Sorbonne. The institution also facilitates semester and summer programs in Barcelona, Spain, catering to students seeking Spanish language and cultural courses.

IAU conducts traveling seminar programs that allow students to explore multiple countries during their studies, including France, Morocco, Spain, Italy, Greece, Czechia, England, and the Netherlands.

IAU's ownership encompasses all of its properties in Aix-en-Provence.

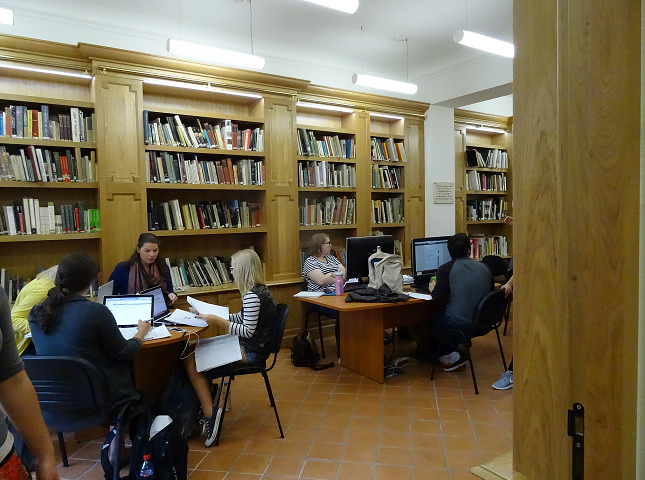
Students working in the library at IAU's main campus in Aix-en-Provence, France.

=== Accreditation and affiliations ===
The Institute for American Universities-American College of the Mediterranean is accredited under the New England Commission of Higher Education (NECHE). Established in 1957, IAU holds a charter from the Regents of the State University of New York and is recognized by the Rectorat of Aix-Marseille University and the French Ministry of Education as a private higher education institution. IAU's status as a 501(c)(3) not-for-profit organization in the United States is registered. The institution is a founding member of the Association of American International Colleges and Universities (AAICU), a national charter member of the Forum on Education Abroad, and a member of the National Association of Foreign Student Admission (NAFSA), the College Consortium for International Studies (CCIS), and the Association of International Education Administrators (AIEA).

== Faculty and governance ==
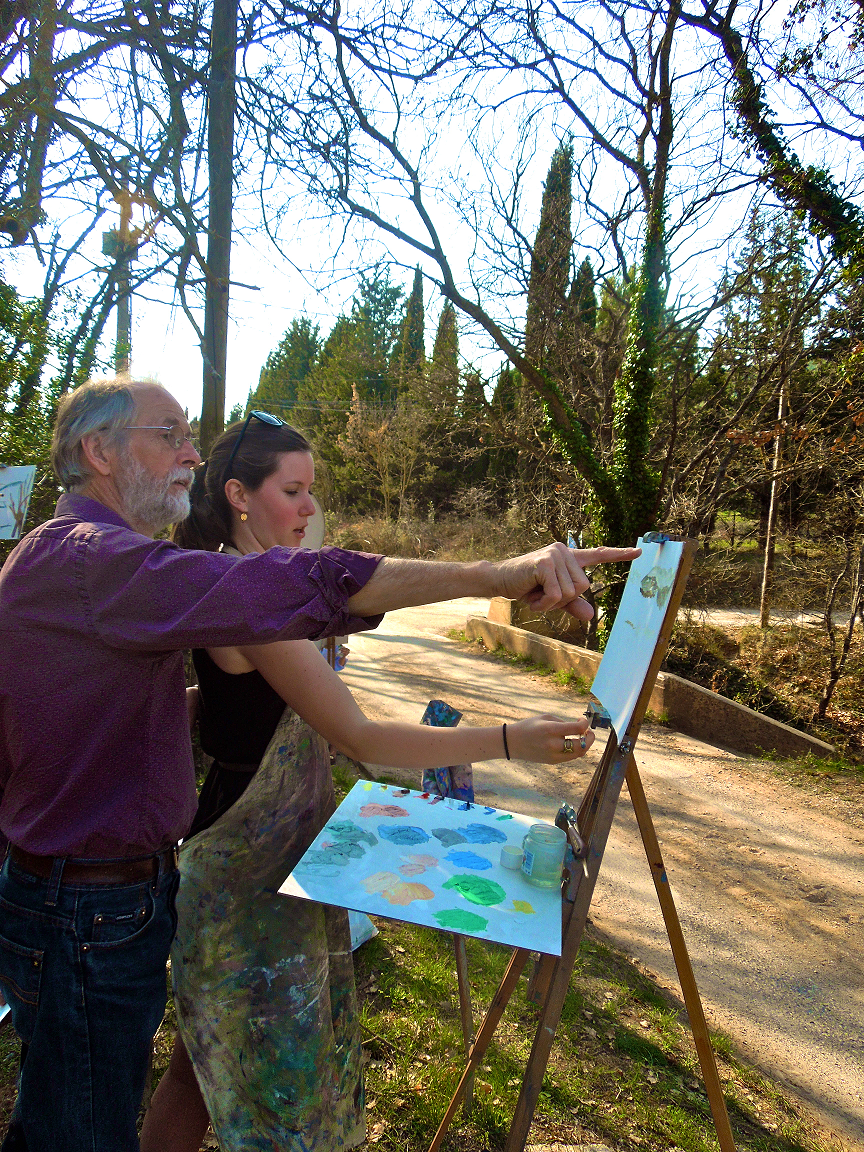
Former Professor and Assistant Dean John Gasparach assisting a student with her landscape painting.

IAU is governed by a private, autonomous Board of Trustees and offers programs leading to bachelor's and master's degrees. It also provides study abroad experiences for students from over 250 partner universities from around the United States, including private institutions such as Harvard University, Cornell University, Tufts University, Rice University,Boston College, and state universities such as University of Texas at Austin, Penn State University, University of Arizona, and University of Illinois Urbana-Champaign.

== Student body ==
Students are primarily enrolled at American institutions, coming to IAU to study abroad.

The student body take internships at local businesses and have lecture series, social events and classroom excursions in collaboration with the neighboring Institut d’Etudes Politiques (Sciences Po- Aix) and the Institut Universitaire Technologique (IUT) of Aix-en-Provence.

== Notable people ==
- Philip Breeden, Diplomat and professor of international relations at IAU
- Frances D. Cook, IAU alumna, former IAU Trustee, and former U.S. Ambassador to Burundi, Cameroon, and Oman
- William Granara, Author and visiting scholar.
- Aboubakr Jamaï, Moroccan journalist and professor of international relations at IAU
- Max Kampelman, diplomat and former IAU Trustee.
- Jeane Kirkpatrick, former IAU Trustee and first woman to serve as the United States Ambassador to the United Nations
- Kurt Volker, IAU Trustee, former United States Ambassador to NATO, and former U.S. Special Representative for Ukraine Negotiations
- Greg Wyatt, IAU Trustee and artist
