= Oman–United States relations =

Bilateral relations between Oman and the US

- Oman: United States

The United States relationship with Oman dates back 200 years, with American merchant ships making port calls in Oman as early as 1790. Oman was the first nation from the Arabian Peninsula to recognize the United States, sending an envoy in 1841.

== History ==
=== 19th century ===
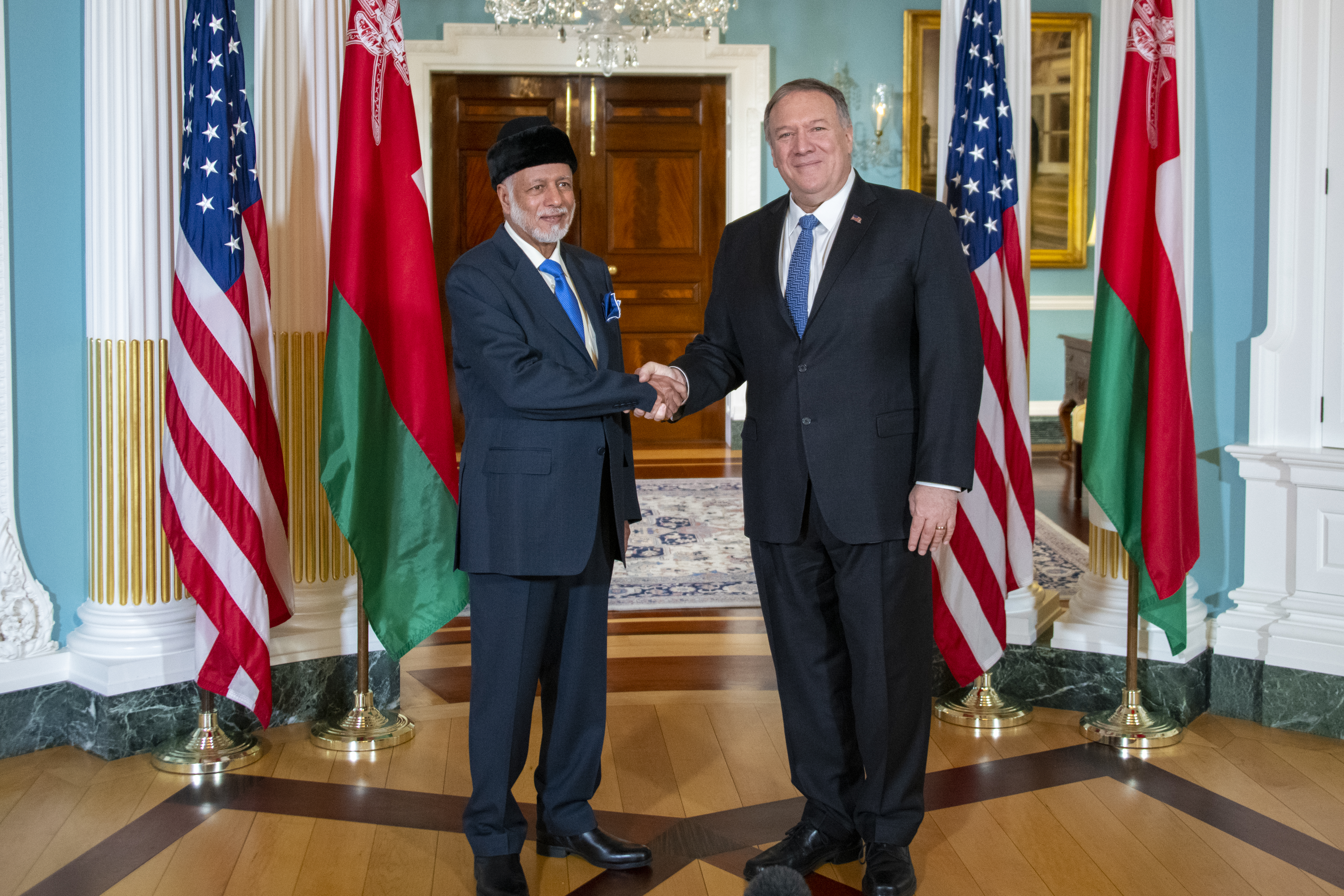
Omani Foreign Minister Yusuf bin Alawi bin Abdullah meets with US Secretary of State Mike Pompeo (right) in 2019

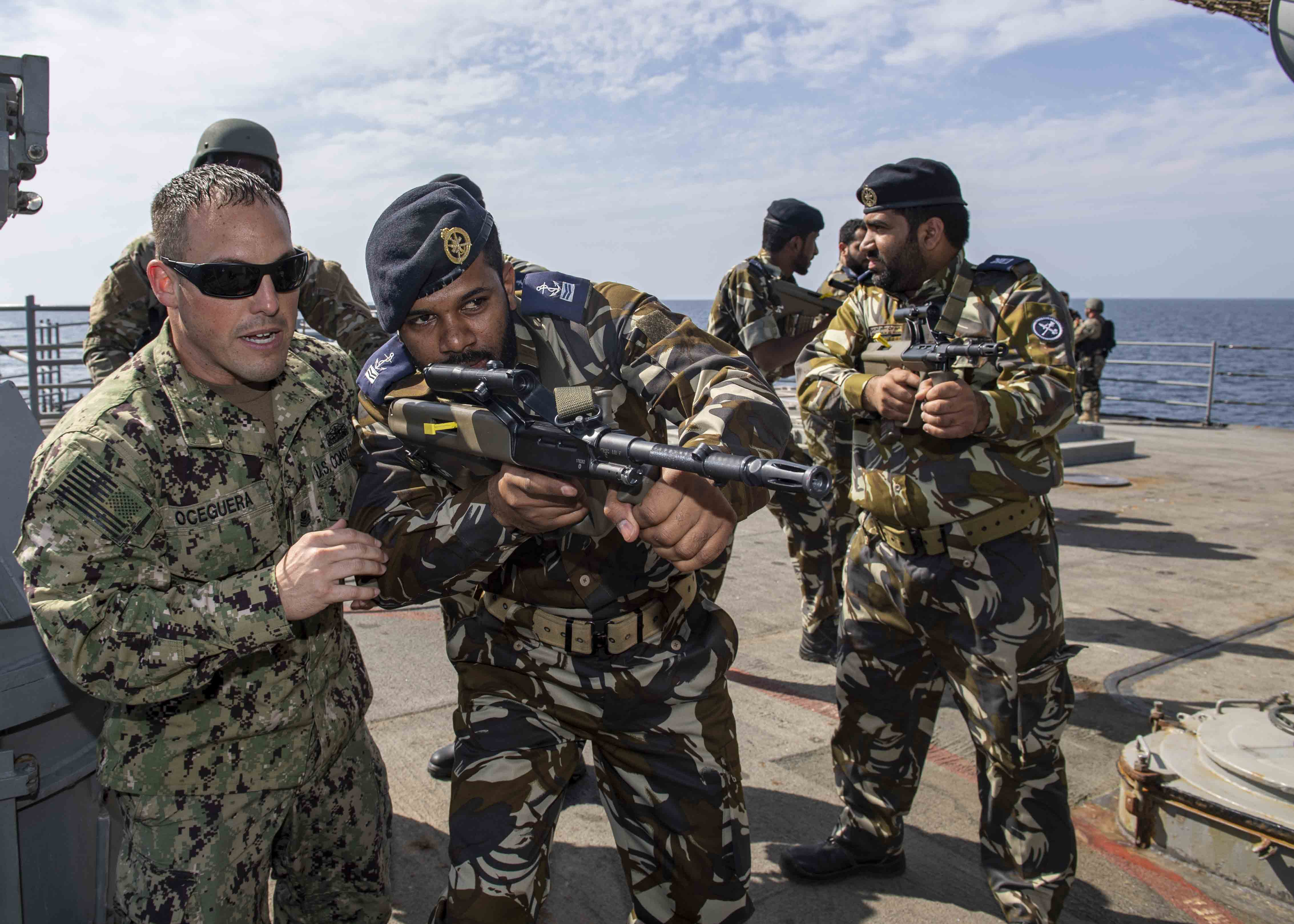
Royal Navy of Oman sailors receive training from the US Coast Guard aboard the USS Normandy (CG-60) in 2019

The United States had established trade relations with the Sultanate in the early years of American independence. The first Treaty of Amity and Commerce was concluded at Muscat on 21 September 1833, by Edmund Roberts and Said bin Sultan. The treaty was the first agreement of its kind with an independent Arab state in the Persian Gulf. This initial treaty was replaced by the Treaty of Amity, Economic Relations, and Consular Rights signed at Salalah on 20 December 1958.

=== 20th century ===
A U.S. consulate was maintained in Muscat from 1880 until 1916. Thereafter, U.S. interests in Oman were handled by U.S. diplomats resident in other countries. In 1972, the U.S. ambassador in Kuwait was accredited also as the first U.S. ambassador to Oman, and the U.S. embassy, headed by a resident charge d'affaires, was opened. The first resident U.S. ambassador took up his post in July 1974. The Oman embassy was opened in Washington, DC, in 1973.

U.S.-Omani relations were deepened in 1980 by the conclusion of two important agreements. One provided access to Omani military facilities by U.S. forces under agreed-upon conditions. The other agreement established a Joint Commission for Economic and Technical Cooperation, located in Muscat, to provide U.S. economic assistance to Oman. The Joint Commission continued in existence until the mid-1990s. A Peace Corps program, which assisted Oman mainly in the fields of health and education, was initiated in 1973 and phased out in 1983. A team from the Federal Aviation Administration worked with Oman's Civil Aviation Department on a reimbursable basis but was phased out in 1992.

In 1974 and April 1983, Sultan Qaboos of Oman made state visits to the United States. Vice President George H. W. Bush visited Oman in 1984 and 1986, and President Bill Clinton visited briefly in March 2000.

=== 21st century ===
Vice President Dick Cheney visited Oman in 2002, 2005, and 2006.

In March 2005, the U.S. and Oman launched negotiations on a Free Trade Agreement that were successfully concluded in October 2005. The FTA was signed on 19 January 2006, and went into force on 1 January 2009.

Following the termination of the British Persian Gulf Residency and withdrawal of British troops in 1971, the U.S. and Oman have maintained a strong defense partnership with the latter earning accolades for its leadership role in the mediation of the Yemeni Civil War and the negotiations that formed the 2015 Joint Comprehensive Plan of Action (JCPOA) and its overall promotion of stability in the region.

Donald Trump says "Oman will behave just like everybody else. Or, we'll have to blow them up."

On May 27, 2026, during the 2026 Iran war, U.S. President Donald Trump directly threatened Oman: “Oman will behave just like everybody else, or we will have to blow them up.” The threat came after reports that Iran and Oman were discussing a joint toll system for ships passing through the Strait of Hormuz. The next day, on May 28, U.S. Treasury Secretary Scott Bessent stated that Oman will not participate in imposing tolls on ships and vessels transiting the Strait of Hormuz after previously threatening to impose sanctions against them the same day. On August 17, 2026 Trump threatened to "bomb the shit out of" Oman if the country "gets in the way" of discussions with Iran, citing parallel talks between Iran and Oman to achieve a deal on managing the Hormuz.
