= Leslie Tsou =

American diplomat

Leslie M. Tsou
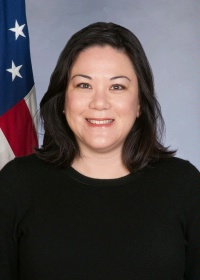

United States Ambassador to Oman
- In office January 10, 2020 – March 30, 2023
- President: Donald Trump; Joe Biden
- Preceded by: Marc Jonathan Sievers
- Succeeded by: Ana A. Escrogima

Personal details
- Education: Georgetown University (BSFS)

Leslie Meredith Tsou is an American diplomat who served as the US Ambassador to Oman from January 10, 2020, to March 30, 2023.

Immediately prior to this assignment, Tsou served as the first Deputy Chief of Mission of the U.S. Embassy in Jerusalem following its opening in May 2018. Before that, she served as the Deputy Chief of Mission at the U.S. Embassy in Tel Aviv from 2016 to 2017.

Tsou earned a Bachelor of Science in Foreign Service from Georgetown University.

She is currently a Senior Fellow at Yale University in the Jackson School of Global Affairs.

== Tenure ==
On April 18, 2022, Oman and the United States signed an agreement on the employment of official employees' spouses. Tsou and Omani diplomat Mohammed Nasser Al Wahaibi were responsible in signing this agreement.

== Personal life ==
Tsou speaks English, broken Arabic, and Polish.

== See also ==
- List of ambassadors appointed by Donald Trump
