= Richard L. Baltimore =

American diplomat

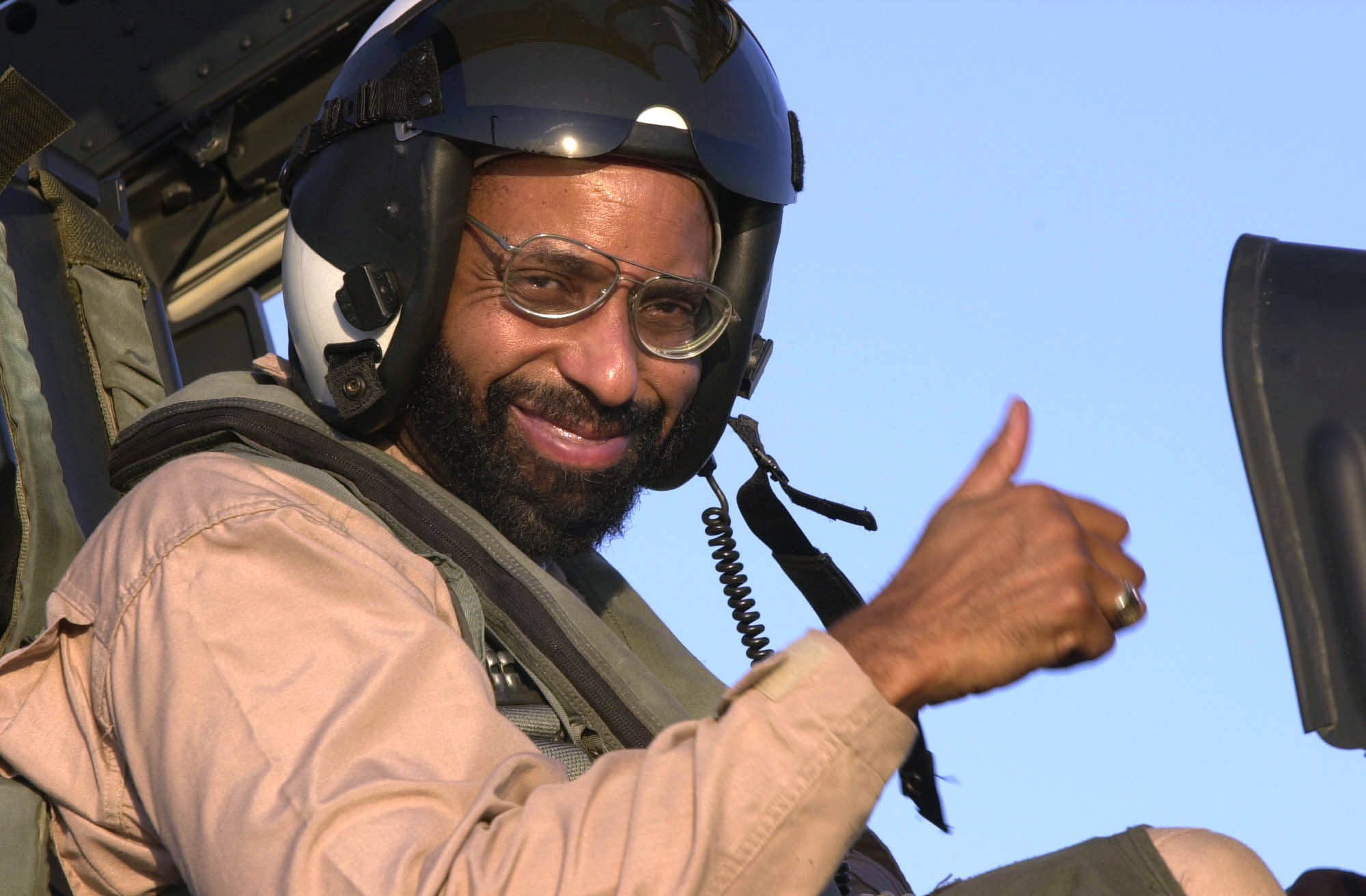
- Richard L. Baltimore
- Born: January 1, 1947 (age 79); New York
- Education: Harvard Law School (M.D.); George Washington University (BS)
- Occupations: Ambassador to Oman،U.S. Consul General in Jeddah, Saudi Arabia.
- Years active: Ambassador to Oman from October 16, 2002 to March 5, 2006.
- Employer(s): Advisor to the board of directors of Omran, Muscat.

Richard Lewis Baltimore III (born 1947) was United States ambassador to Oman from October 16, 2002, to March 5, 2006. Prior to becoming ambassador, Baltimore was the U.S. consul general in Jeddah, Saudi Arabia.

== Professional career ==
Baltimore is a native of New York with a degree in international affairs from George Washington University and a Juris Doctor from Harvard Law School. He speaks French, Hungarian, Spanish, and Portuguese. Baltimore was the U.S. consul general in Jeddah, Saudi Arabia, and was ambassador to Oman. Other overseas assignments include serving as the deputy chief of mission at the U.S. Embassy in San Jose, Costa Rica from 1996 to 1999 and holding the same position in Budapest, Hungary from 1990 to 1994. His prior tours as a political officer include Hungary, Egypt, South Africa, Portugal plus a special assignment to Zambia during the civil war in Rhodesia. From 1994 to 1995 he was a senior policy advisor to Assistant Secretary of State for European and Canadian Affairs Richard C. Holbrooke. At the Department of State he was also the director of the Regional Affairs Office in the Near Eastern and South Asian Bureau. He was also a special assistant to Cyrus Vance, Edmund Muskie and Al Haig.

He is now the advisor to the board of directors of Omran, Muscat.

Diplomatic posts
Preceded by John B. Craig	U.S. Ambassador to Oman; October 16, 2002 – March 5, 2006	Succeeded by Gary A. Grappo
