= Robert William Dean =

American diplomat

Robert William Dean (May 25, 1920 – September 10, 2014) was an American diplomat.

Born in Hinsdale, Illinois, Dean went to Morton High School. During World War II, Dean served in the United States Navy. He received a master's degree in international relations from University of Chicago. He served in the United States Foreign Service and lived in Brazil, Chile, and Mexico. He served as United States Ambassador to Peru from 1974 to 1977. In 1978, Dean retired from the United States Foreign Service and lived in Dallas, Texas. He worked for the Dallas Chamber of Commerce and owned an international consulting business. Dean died in Dallas, Texas.
