= Robert A. Stein (diplomat) =

American diplomat (1919–1998)

Robert Andrew Stein (March 12, 1919 – September 20, 1998) was an American diplomat who served as Principal Officer in Yemen, February–July 1972; Chargé d'Affaires ad interim beginning service when the Embassy in San'a was reestablished on July 1, 1972 (On April 10, 1970, the United States established an Interests Section in the Italian Embassy); Chargé d'Affaires ad interim to Libya (December 1973-December 1974) and Chargé d'Affaires ad interim to Mauritania beginning March 4, 1970. Stein was born in New Jersey on March 12, 1919. He died on September 20, 1998, at the age of 79.
