= John B. Craig =

American diplomat

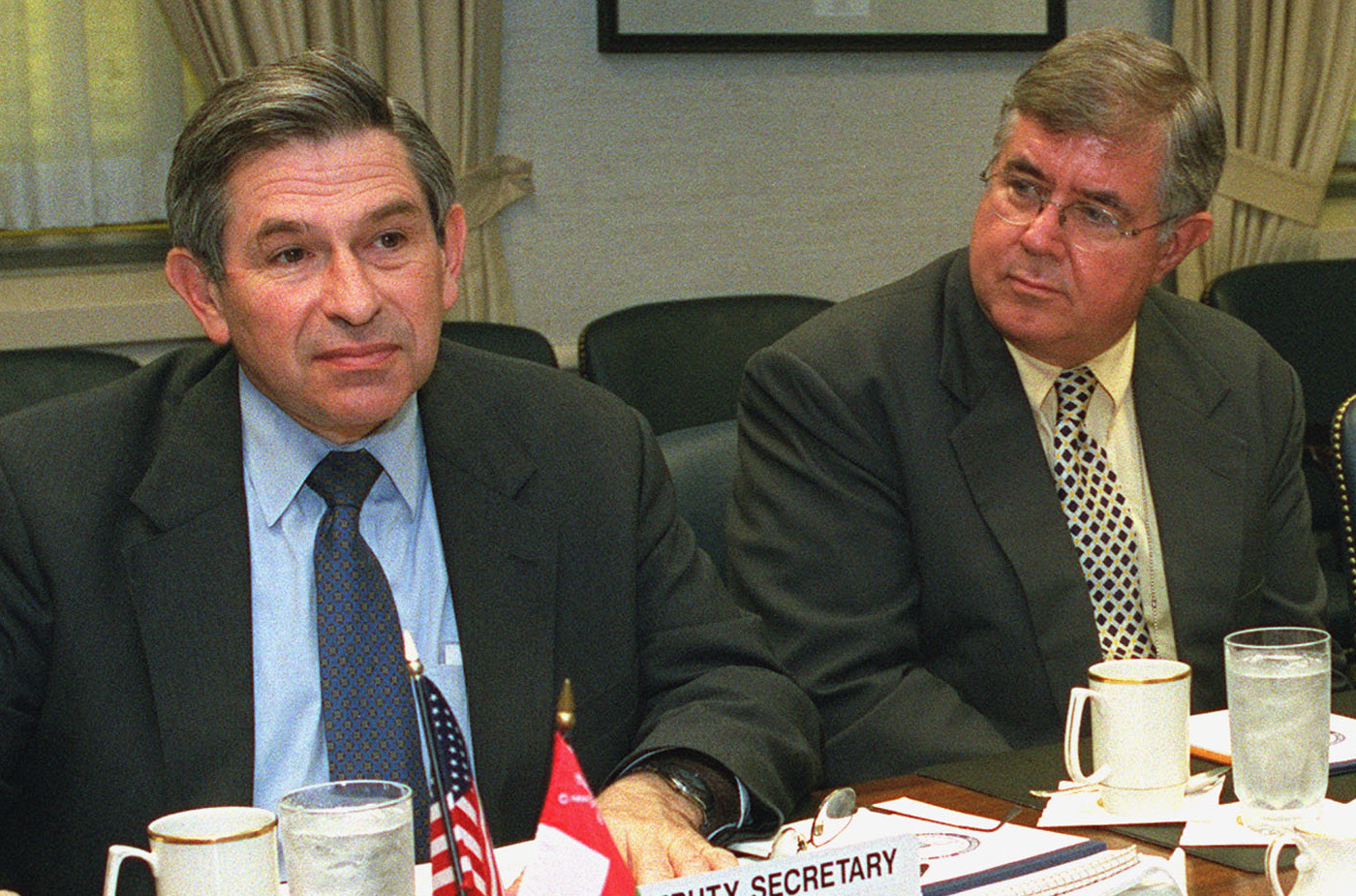
John Craig (right) with Defense Secretary Paul Wolfowitz in 2001

John Bruce Craig (born 1945) is a native of Pennsylvania. He served the United States of America as Special Assistant to the President and Senior Director for Combating Terrorism under President George W. Bush. The Boeing Company appointed Craig to the position of Regional Vice President in the Middle East, based in the United Arab Emirates, with a concentration on Arab states of the Persian Gulf. He is currently a full partner and chairman of the board for The Jadwin Consulting Group, a prominent business consulting firm based in Abu Dhabi, founded by Thomas G. Finck in 2007 and focusing on business ventures and private equity opportunities in the Persian Gulf region.

Previously, he was Ambassador to Oman from July 31, 1998, to 2001. Craig has also served as Director of Arabian Peninsula Affairs, Bureau of Near Eastern Affairs in the Department of State, Deputy Chief of Mission in Damascus, Syria and Bogota, Colombia.

Craig holds a B.S. degree from American University's School of International Service. He earned a master's degree in international relations from the National War College at the National Defense University.

He has served as scholar-in-residence at Elizabethtown College in Lancaster County, Pennsylvania since October 2002. On May 20, 2006, he received on honorary degree of Doctor of Public Service from Elizabethtown College.

He was married to Gerre Lee Johnson Craig; they have one son, Jason. His wife died suddenly in 2016. Craig speaks French, Arabic, and Spanish.

Diplomatic posts
| Preceded by Francis D. Cook | U.S. Ambassador to Oman; 1998–2001 | Succeeded by Richard L. Baltimore |
