= Richard Wood Boehm =

American diplomat

Richard Wood Boehm (1926 Queens, New York City - November 28, 2011 Bethesda, Maryland) was a Career Foreign Service Officer who served as the American ambassador to Cyprus (1984 to 1987) and Oman (1989-1992). When he was nominated to be Ambassador to Oman, Boehm was a diplomat-in-residence and visiting professor at Howard University.

Boehm graduated from Jamaica High School and Adelphi University (Class of 1950, English Major). Married while a senior in college, Boehm and his wife settled in Levittown, New York and he went to work at Prentice Hall as a proofreader. He was promoted to editor but needed to leave the job to make more money. He entered the management training program at the Mutual Insurance Co. of New York. In 1953, he took the Foreign Service exam. His first job was in the News Division in Washington, DC.
