= Raymond C. Ewing =

American diplomat (born 1936)

Raymond Charles Ewing (born September 7, 1936 Cleveland, Ohio) was an American Career Foreign Service Officer who served as the Ambassador Extraordinary and Plenipotentiary to Cyprus (1981-1984) and Ghana (1989-1992).

When Ewing was seven, he and his family moved first to Berkeley, California, and then Santa Cruz, California. He went on to graduate from Occidental College, class of 1957, as a history major. He entered the Foreign Service shortly after his 21st birthday. He would later earn a MPA from Harvard University.
