= Marc Jonathan Sievers =

American diplomat

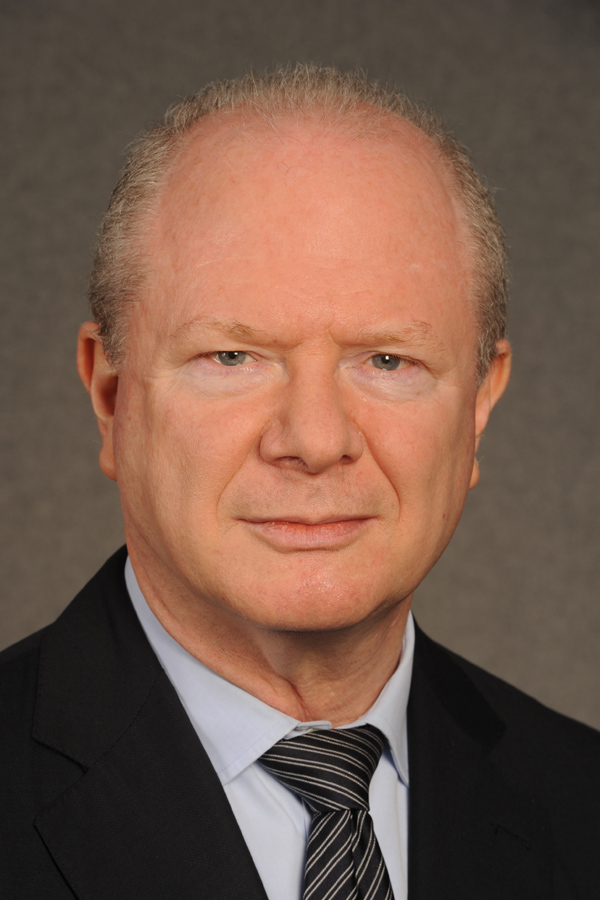
Former United States Ambassador Marc J Sievers

Marc Jonathan Sievers is an Abu Dhabi-based business consultant and Middle East policy analyst. He is the former U.S. Ambassador to the Sultanate of Oman, where he served from January 7, 2016 to November 30, 2019. A career member of the Senior Foreign Service with the rank of Minister-Counselor, Sievers has over three decades of experience as an American diplomat, with expertise in U.S. relations with the Middle East and North Africa, including Gulf Arab states, Egypt, Iraq, and Israel.

In 2021, Sievers became the inaugural director of AJC Abu Dhabi, the Sidney Lerner Center for Arab-Jewish Understanding, a position he held until 2026, focusing on Arab-Israeli normalization efforts and the Abraham Accords framework. He subsequently established himself as a business consultant and policy commentator based in Abu Dhabi.

== Education ==
- BA, history, University of Utah, 1978
- Master of International Affairs Columbia University 1980

== Career ==
Sievers entered the Foreign Service in 1981. He was the first person to serve as Diplomat-in-Residence at the Washington Institute for Near East Policy (2014–15). Within the State Department, he's served as U.S. deputy chief of mission and chargé d'affaires in Cairo and various posts all over the Middle East including Baghdad, Tel Aviv and Algiers. He was a senior adviser to Iraq's Ministry of Foreign Affairs as part of the Coalition Provisional Authority (CPA) - a position for which he volunteered.
