= Frank C. Urbancic Jr. =

American Career Foreign Service Officer

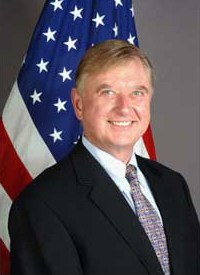
Frank C. Urbancic Jr.

Frank C. Urbancic Jr. (1951 – May 17, 2016) was an American Career Foreign Service Officer who served as Ambassador to Cyprus and Chargé d'Affaires ad interim, and Deputy Chief of Mission at the U.S. Embassy in Kuwait from 2002–2004. He was Consul General in Istanbul, Turkey and was responsible for administering a multimillion dollar assistance package after a devastating earthquake in 1999.

== Education ==
Urbancic earned a B.A. in French Literature from New York University (1974), an M.A. in Byzantine History from City College of New York (1978), and an M.S. in National Security Strategy from the National Defense University in Washington, D.C. (1993).

== Career ==
He served as Principal Deputy Assistant Secretary and Deputy to the Coordinator in the Office of the Coordinator for Counterterrorism. While in Kuwait, "Urbancic coordinated U.S. priorities with the host government and managed the bilateral relationship to ensure access for U.S. and coalition forces into Iraq in 2003."
