= Contents of the United States diplomatic cables leak (Israel) =

Material about Israel in the leak of US diplomatic cables on 28 November 2010

Contents of the United States diplomatic cables leak refers to material about Israel in the leak of United States diplomatic cables on 28 November 2010. WikiLeaks, a website that publishes documents from anonymous news sources and news leaks began publishing classified documents and diplomatic cables sent from the United States Department of State to diplomatic missions around the world. After the initial release date, other documents were released daily.

== Israeli–Palestinian conflict ==
In a conversation with US Congressman Gary Ackerman in 2007, Israeli Opposition Leader Benjamin Netanyahu said Israeli President Shimon Peres had admitted to him that the Oslo peace process Peres helped initiate was based on a mistaken premise. Netanyahu said Peres had told him the European and U.S. assistance to the Palestinian Authority (PA) had established a "bloated bureaucracy, with PA employees looking to the international community to meet their payroll."

In one document from April 2007, Netanyahu, who was opposition leader at the time, describes the Palestinian Authority President Mahmoud Abbas as a "nice man who means well" and urges Washington to focus on toppling Hamas through an "economic squeeze" saying it would be "easier to weaken Hamas than to strengthen Abbas."

In 2008, U.S. diplomats in the Middle East were instructed to secretly collect personal information on Palestinian leaders, and to monitor closely Israeli military and telecommunication capabilities. One U.S. State Department directive orders U.S. diplomats to report on Israeli Military tactics, techniques, and procedures dealing with conventional and unconventional counterinsurgency operations.

In 2007, then Israeli Minister of Foreign Affairs Tzipi Livni said she "doubted that a final status agreement could be reached with Abbas, and therefore the emphasis should be on reforming Fatah so that it could beat Hamas at the polls." Mossad chief Meir Dagan told U.S. diplomat Frances Fragos Townsend that "nothing will be achieved" in the peace process according to a secret cable the U.S. Embassy in Tel Aviv sent to the State Department. During a two-hour meeting, Dagan told Townsend that Palestinian Authority President Mahmoud Abbas would "likely move to Qatar and join his mysteriously wealthy son there" in the event Hamas took over the West Bank. In the same cable, Dagan was recorded accusing Saudi Foreign Minister Saud bin Faisal of playing a "very negative role" and characterized Qatar as "a real problem", accusing its leader Sheikh Hamid bin Khalifa al-Thani of "annoying everyone." He also suggested the U.S. should move its bases out of Qatar.

According to a cable from the U.S. embassy in Tel Aviv, Netanyahu supports the concept of land-swaps with the Palestinian Authority and does not want to govern the West Bank and Gaza but rather to stop attacks from being launched from there.

Netanyahu was described by Luis G. Moreno in one cable: 'Netanyahu warned that when Israel left Lebanon it created a first Iranian base, that when it left Gaza it created a second Iranian base, and if Israel "promised" a third retreat from the West Bank it would see the same results. There were three options, according to Netanyahu, including withdrawing to the 1967 borders (which would "get terror, not peace"), doing nothing (which he considered "just as bad"), or "rapidly building a pyramid from the ground up." Netanyahu suggested a rapid move to develop the West Bank economically, including "unclogging" bureaucratic "bottlenecks."

In April 2007 Benjamin Netanyahu said that the Palestinian right of return would have to be abandoned in return for peace. Ackerman summarised his discussion with Netanyahu on this point, saying, 'Netanyahu stated that a return to the 1967 borders and dividing Jerusalem was not a solution since further withdrawals would only whet the appetite of radical Islam. Ackerman asked if the Palestinians would accept peace based on the 1967 lines. Netanyahu said he would not agree to such a withdrawal since the 1967 lines were indefensible, but he added that the "right of return" was the real acid test of Arab intentions.'

=== Gaza ===
In 2008, Israel told U.S. officials that Israel would keep Gaza's economy "on the brink of collapse", at a level just above that of a humanitarian crisis, according to U.S. diplomatic cables published by Norway's Aftenposten. "As part of their overall embargo plan against Gaza, Israeli officials have confirmed to (U.S. embassy economic officers) on multiple occasions that they intend to keep the Gazan economy on the brink of collapse without quite pushing it over the edge," a November 3, 2008 U.S. cable stated. Israel wanted to maintain Gaza "functioning at the lowest level possible consistent with avoiding a humanitarian crisis," according to the cable.

This Israeli policy of avoiding a humanitarian crisis was not consistent with a January 2008 speech by Prime Minister Ehud Olmert in which he said that "We will not harm the supply of food for children, medicine for those who need it and fuel for institutions that save lives." In fact, on the ground in Gaza, International aid agencies warned that ordinary life was becoming intolerable. "It is causing ongoing deterioration in the social, economic and environmental determinants of health... [I]t is hampering the provision of medical supplies and the training of health staff. While the “indiscriminate” sanctions are affecting the entire population of Gaza, women, children and the elderly are the first victims.

People in Gaza are rapidly running out of food, fuel and medicine because of the Israeli military’s restrictions on emergency supplies, aid agencies warned. Save the Children called the situation a “catastrophe.”

[I]t is preventing patients with serious medical conditions from getting timely specialized treatment." The agencies highlighted the case of a student, Fidaa Hijji, who died of cancer while waiting for Israeli permission to go to hospital for a bone marrow operation.

According to a 2011 UNRWA report, Gaza unemployment rate is at 45% of the total working age population, and real wages have fallen more than 30% in 2010 since 2006, the year Israel imposed the embargo. "These are disturbing trends," said UNRWA spokesman Chris Gunness, "and the refugees, who make up two-thirds of Gaza's 1.5 million population, were the worst hit." He said: "It is hard to understand the logic of a man-made policy which deliberately impoverishes so many and condemns hundreds of thousands of potentially productive people to a life of destitution."

Israeli Defense Minister Ehud Barak consulted with Fatah of the Palestinian Authority and asked if Fatah could take over control of Gaza Strip after expected Israeli victory during Operation Cast Lead, but met with refusal.

In June 2007, after violent clashes between Fatah and Hamas broke out in Gaza, Director of Israel Military Intelligence Major General Amos Yadlin told U.S. Ambassador Richard Jones that he would "be happy" if Hamas took control of the Gaza Strip. Yadlin stated that a Hamas takeover would be a positive step, because Israel would then be able to declare Gaza as a hostile entity. Jones stated that if Fatah loses control of the Strip, Abbas would be urged to form a separate government in the West Bank. Yadlin replied that such developments would please Israel, because the IDF would not have to deal with Hamas as a stateless body. He also added that Israel would be able to cooperate with a Fatah-controlled West Bank. The relevant cable cautioned that this did not necessarily represent a consensus view within the Israeli government.

A cable written in 2006 asserted that some multinational companies — Coca-Cola, Procter & Gamble, Motorola, Dell, etc. — complained to U.S. diplomats of being forced to pay bribes to Israeli authorities charged of overseeing the Karni Crossing to have their products distributed into the Gaza Strip. The bribes allegedly occurred one year before Hamas won the 2006 Palestinian legislative elections and Israel imposed the economic embargo over Gaza.

In February 2010 IDF Advocate-General Major General Avichai Mandelblit revealed to James Cunningham, US ambassador to Israel, that the Israeli army had used drones in its fight against Gaza militants. The two men met to give the ambassador more information on the investigation of civilian deaths caused during Operation Cast Lead in Gaza in 2008–2009. According to the General Mandelblit, 16 civilians were killed in Gaza when a drone fired against militants in front of a mosque. Most of them were praying inside the mosque.

== Second Lebanon War ==
Netanyahu allegedly described Kadima as a "fake party" and referred to the Second Lebanon War as "stupid" and criticized the approach of Ehud Olmert's policies towards the conflict.

== Iran–Israel relations ==
In August 2007, Mossad chief Meir Dagan suggested to the U.S. to use Iranian student unions and ethnic minority groups to try to overthrow the government of Iran. WikiLeaks documents also suggest that Dagan denied plans to attack a Syrian nuclear facility, just two months before an attack actually happened.

In June 2009 Ehud Barak, Israel's defence minister, told U.S. congressman that Israel "saw 2010 as a pivotal year" in stopping Iran from acquiring nuclear weapons, inferring it would attack Iran if the weapons program was not stopped by then. This is the Israeli military's preferred option. Other revelations included that Israeli Mossad chief Meir Dagan, senior military men and diplomats repeatedly explained to various U.S. visitors Israel's concerns. The United States did not want it to be known that it was supplying bunker-buster munitions that could be used for this purpose.

== See also ==
- Palestine Papers
