= Jeffrey D. Feltman =

American diplomat

Jeffrey Feltman
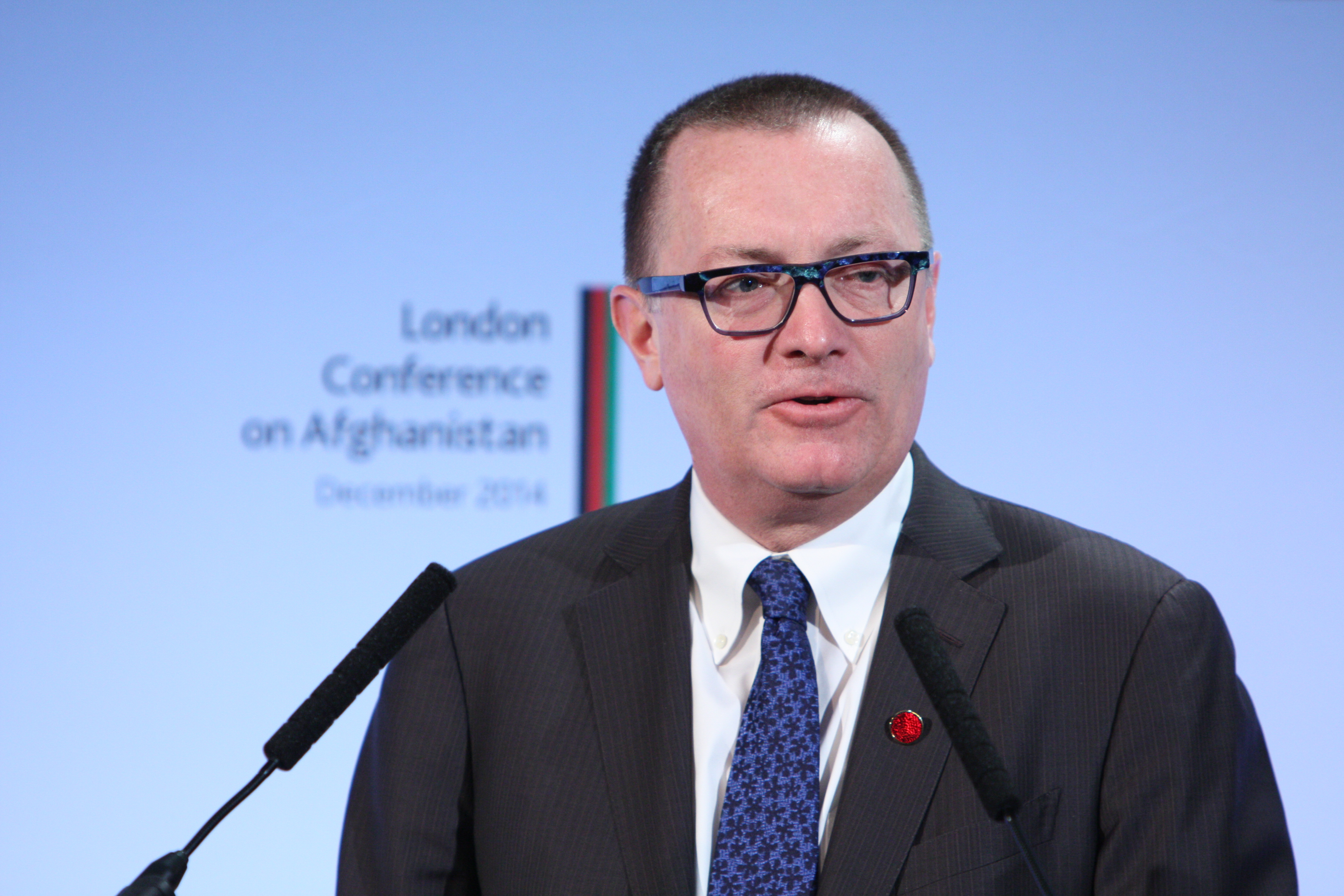
- Feltman in 2014

United States Special Envoy for the Horn of Africa
- In office April 23, 2021 – January 10, 2022
- President: Joe Biden
- Succeeded by: David M. Satterfield

22nd Assistant Secretary of State for Near Eastern Affairs
- In office August 18, 2009 – May 31, 2012
- President: Barack Obama
- Preceded by: David Welch
- Succeeded by: Anne W. Patterson

United States Ambassador to Lebanon
- In office August 25, 2004 – January 25, 2008
- President: George W. Bush
- Preceded by: Vincent M. Battle
- Succeeded by: Michele J. Sison

United States Consul General in Jerusalem
- In office November 2002 – September 2003
- President: George W. Bush
- Preceded by: Ronald L. Schlicher
- Succeeded by: David D. Pearce

Personal details
- Born: Jeffrey David Feltman; 1959 (age 66–67) Greenville, Ohio, U.S.
- Education: Ball State University (BA); Tufts University (MA)

Jeffrey David Feltman (born 1959) is an American diplomat and former U.S. Special Envoy for Horn of Africa, serving from April 23, 2021 to January 10, 2022. He previously served as United Nations Under-Secretary-General for Political Affairs. As head of the United Nations Department of Political Affairs Feltman oversaw the UN's diplomatic efforts to prevent and mitigate conflict worldwide.

== Early life and education ==
Feltman was born to parents David and Roberta Feltman in Greenville, Ohio in 1959. He earned a Bachelor of Arts degree in history and fine arts from Ball State University in 1981 and a Master of Arts in law and diplomacy from the Fletcher School of Law and Diplomacy at Tufts University in 1983. He speaks Hebrew, English, French, Arabic and Hungarian.

== Career ==
Feltman joined the United States Foreign Service in 1986, serving his first tour as consular officer in Port-au-Prince, Haiti. He served as an economic officer at the U.S. Embassy in Hungary from 1988 to 1991. From 1991 to 1993, Feltman served in the office of the Deputy Secretary of State, Lawrence Eagleburger as a special assistant concentrating on the coordination of U.S. assistance to Eastern and Central Europe.

After a year of Arabic studies at the University of Jordan in Amman, Feltman served in the U.S. Embassy in Tel Aviv from 1995 to 1998, covering economic issues in the Gaza Strip. From 1998 to 2000, Feltman served as chief of the political and economic section at the U.S. Embassy in Tunisia. He served in Embassy Tel Aviv as Ambassador Martin Indyk's special assistant on peace process issues from 2000 to 2001. He then moved to the U.S. Consulate General in Jerusalem, where he served first as deputy from August 2001 to November 2002) and then as acting principal officer from November 2002 to December 2003.

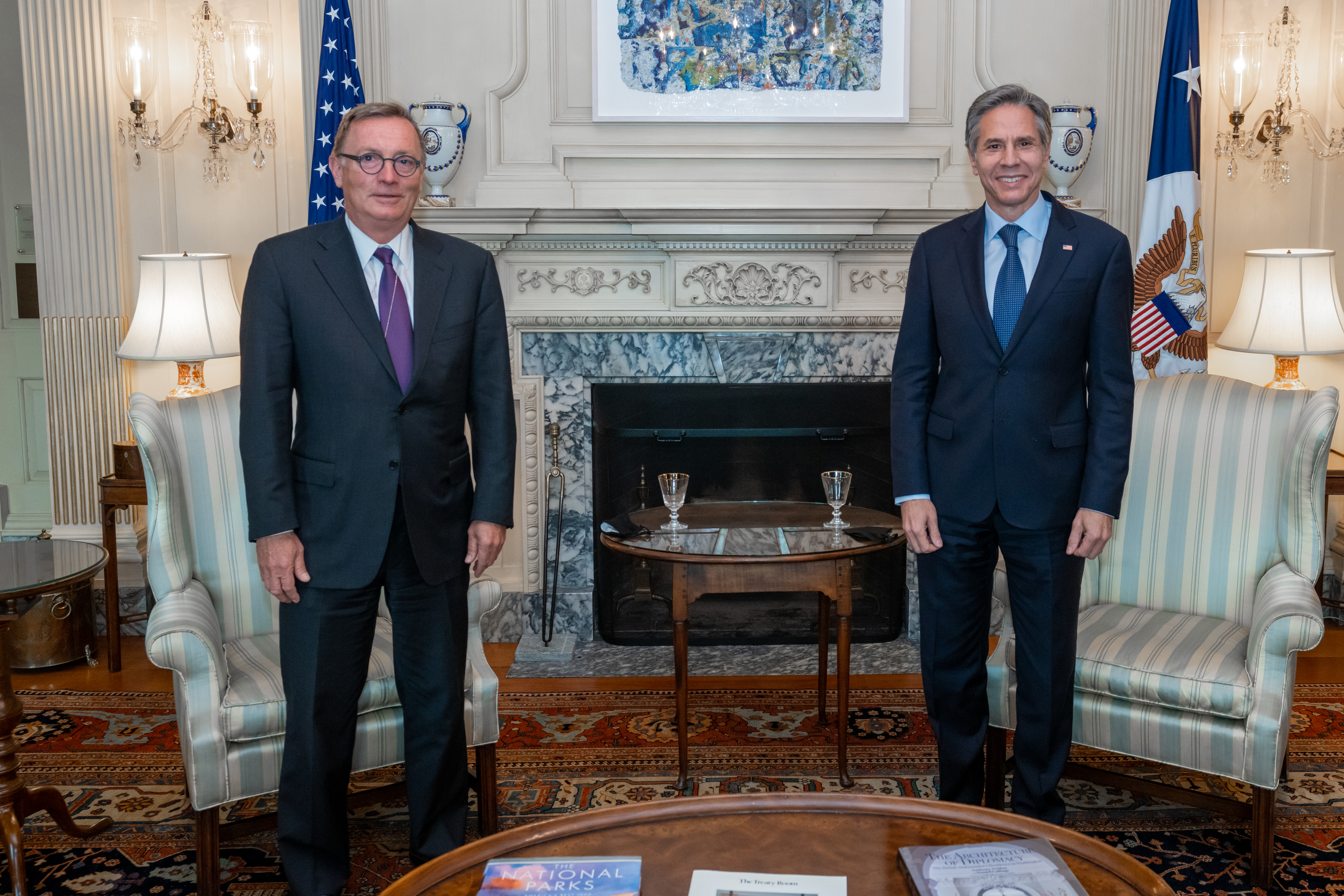
Feltman meets with Secretary of State Antony J. Blinken at the U.S. Department of State in Washington, D.C., on April 23, 2021.

Feltman volunteered to serve at the Coalition Provisional Authority office in Irbil, Iraq, from January to April 2004. from which he moved on to become the United States ambassador to Lebanon from July 2004 to January 2008.

Feltman served as the assistant secretary of state for Near Eastern affairs from August 2009 to June 2012 with the rank of career minister, before taking his post at the United Nations. In June 2012 he was appointed under-secretary-general for political affairs, a position he held until April 2018.

In September 2017, Feltman announced his support for Palestinian statehood, stating "Economic development, critical as it is, is no substitute for sovereignty and statehood."

Diplomatic posts
Preceded by Vincent M. Battle	United States Ambassador to Lebanon; 2004–2008	Succeeded by Michele J. Sison
Government offices
Preceded by David Welch	Assistant Secretary of State for Near Eastern Affairs; August 2009 – June 2012	Succeeded by A. Elizabeth Jones (acting)
Diplomatic posts
Preceded by B. Lynn Pascoe	Under-Secretary-General of the United Nations, United Nations Department of Political Affairs; July 2012 – April 2018	Succeeded by Rosemary DiCarlo
