= Carwile =

Carwile is a surname. Notable people with the surname include:

- Howard Carwile (1911–1987), American lawyer and politician
- John Carwile (fl. 2019), American diplomat
