= Ronald L. Schlicher =

American diplomat (1956–2019)

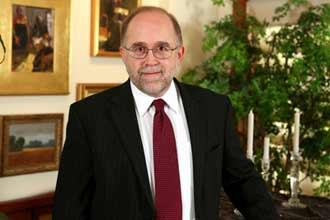

United States Ambassador to Cyprus
- In office December 20, 2005 – January 5, 2008
- President: George W. Bush
- Preceded by: Michael Klosson
- Succeeded by: Frank C. Urbancic Jr.

United States Consul General in Jerusalem
- In office 2000–2002
- President: Bill Clinton; George W. Bush
- Preceded by: John E. Herbst
- Succeeded by: Jeffrey D. Feltman

United States ambassador to Lebanon Acting
- In office October 1994 – February 1996
- President: Bill Clinton
- Preceded by: Vincent M. Battle (acting)
- Succeeded by: Richard Henry Jones

Personal details
- Born: September 16, 1956; Sylacauga, Alabama, U.S.
- Died: September 26, 2019 (aged 63); Brentwood, Tennessee, U.S.
- Profession: Diplomat

Ronald Lewis Schlicher (September 16, 1956 – September 26, 2019) was a US diplomat. He joined the State Department in 1982 as a diplomat and career foreign service officer with the rank of minister-counselor in the Department of State. He served as the deputy chief of mission in Lebanon (chargé d'affaires) 1994–96 and United States consul-general in Jerusalem from 2000 to November 2002. He also served as ambassador to Cyprus from 2005 to 2008. On September 2, 2008, he assumed the position of principal deputy assistant coordinator for counterterrorism.

== Personal ==
Schlicher was born in Sylacauga, Alabama, and grew up in Chattanooga. He was an alumnus of Red Bank High School and attended the University of Tennessee and graduated with a bachelor's degree in 1978 and JD from the University of Tennessee College of Law in 1981.

Schlicher was fluent in French and Arabic.

After his diplomatic career ended (sometime after 2011) he settled down in Brentwood, Tennessee, where he died in 2019.

== Notes ==
Diplomatic posts
Preceded by Vincent M. Battle; Acting	United States ambassador to Lebanon; Acting; 1994–1996	Succeeded by Richard Henry Jones
Preceded by Michael Klosson	United States ambassador to Cyprus; 2005–2008	Succeeded by Frank C. Urbancic Jr.
