= Earl L. Packer =

American diplomat (1894–1993)

Earl Le Noir Packer (November 19, 1894 – December 26, 1993) served as the first United States Chargé d'Affaires ad interim to Burma from September 19, 1947, when Embassy Rangoon was established, to October 17, 1947.

Diplomatic posts
Preceded by John C. Wiley	Chargé d'Affaires ad interim to Latvia; 1940	Succeeded by Soviet occupation of Latvia (1940–1991); Ints M. Siliņš
Preceded by first incumbent	Chargé d'Affaires ad interim to Burma; 1947	Succeeded by J. Klahr Huddle
