= List of ambassadors of the United States to Kazakhstan =

Ambassador of the United States to Kazakhstan
- Seal of the United States Department of State

- Flag of a United States ambassador

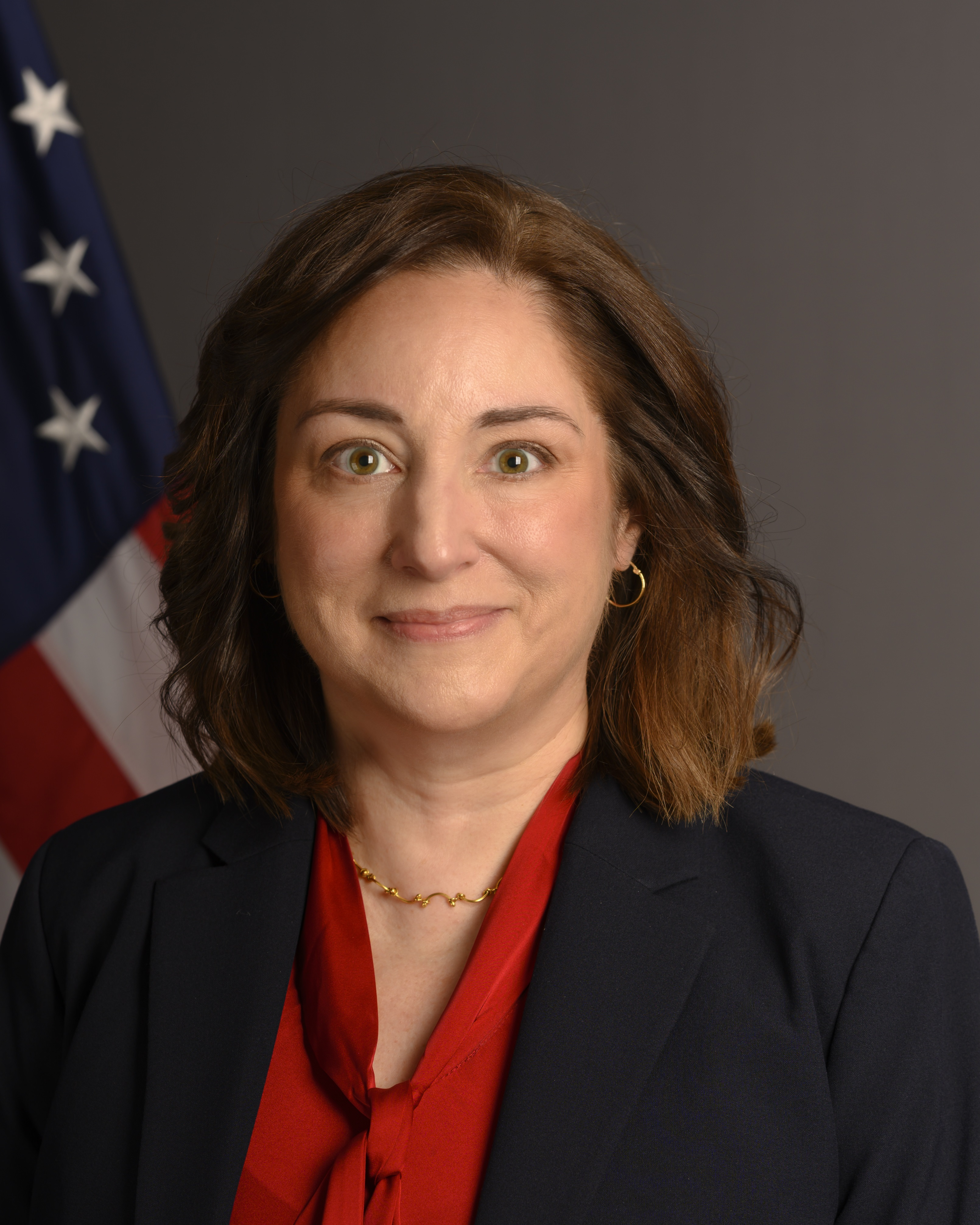
- Incumbent; Julie Stufft since January 9, 2026
- Nominator: The president of the United States
- Appointer: The president with Senate advice and consent
- Website: U.S. Embassy - Astana

This is a list of ambassadors of the United States to Kazakhstan.

Kazakhstan had been a constituent Soviet Socialist Republic (SSR) of the Soviet Union. Upon dissolution of the Soviet Union, Kazakhstan declared independence on December 16, 1991. It was the last of the Soviet republics to declare independence.

The United States recognized Kazakhstan ten days later on December 26, 1991. The U.S. embassy was established in Almaty (then named Alma-Ata) on February 3, 1992, with William Harrison Courtney as chargé d'affaires ad interim. He was subsequently appointed as the first U.S. ambassador to Kazakhstan.

In 1997 the nation's capital was moved to Astana, where the U.S. embassy is now located.

== Ambassadors ==
Name	Title	Appointed	Presented credentials	Terminated mission	Notes
William Harrison Courtney – Career FSO	Ambassador Extraordinary and Plenipotentiary	August 11, 1992	September 15, 1992	July 1, 1995	
A. Elizabeth Jones – Career FSO	Ambassador Extraordinary and Plenipotentiary	October 3, 1995	October 18, 1995	October 12, 1998	
Richard Henry Jones – Career FSO	Ambassador Extraordinary and Plenipotentiary	October 22, 1998	January 23, 1999	June 10, 2001	
Larry C. Napper – Career FSO	Ambassador Extraordinary and Plenipotentiary	August 3, 2001	September 19, 2001	July 7, 2004	
John M. Ordway – Career FSO	Ambassador Extraordinary and Plenipotentiary	May 12, 2004	September 17, 2004	September 15, 2008	
Richard E. Hoagland – Career FSO	Ambassador Extraordinary and Plenipotentiary	September 10, 2008	October 7, 2008	January 13, 2011	
John Ordway – Career FSO	Chargé d'Affaires ad interim	Assumption of duties: January 15, 2011	-	September 21, 2011	
Kenneth J. Fairfax – Career FSO	Ambassador Extraordinary and Plenipotentiary	July 5, 2011	October 25, 2011	September 16, 2013	
John M. Ordway – Career FSO	Chargé d'Affaires ad interim	Assumption of duties: October 16, 2013	-	December 19, 2014	
George A. Krol – Career FSO	Ambassador Extraordinary and Plenipotentiary	January 8, 2015	March 18, 2015	September 17, 2018	
William H. Moser – Career FSO	Ambassador Extraordinary and Plenipotentiary	January 7, 2019	February 18, 2019	October 25, 2021	
Judy Kuo	Chargé d'Affaires ad interim	Assumption of duties: October 25, 2021	-	November 14, 2022	
Daniel N. Rosenblum – Political appointee	Ambassador Extraordinary and Plenipotentiary	August 4, 2022	November 14, 2022	January 20, 2025	
Deborah Robinson – Career FSO	Chargé d'Affaires ad interim	January 20, 2025		January 6, 2026	
Julie Stufft – Career FSO	Ambassador Extraordinary and Plenipotentiary	October 7, 2025	January 9, 2026	Present	

== See also ==
- Kazakhstan – United States relations
- Foreign relations of Kazakhstan
- Ambassadors of the United States
- List of ambassadors of Kazakhstan to the United States
