= Brian E. Carlson =

U.S. civil servant

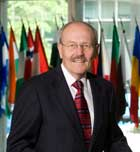

United States Ambassador to Latvia
- In office 5 November 2001 – 6 December 2004
- President: George W. Bush
- Preceded by: James Howard Holmes
- Succeeded by: Catherine Todd Bailey

Personal details
- Born: 1947 (age 78–79) Alexandria, Virginia
- Education: Vanderbilt University

Brian E. Carlson (born 1947 in Alexandria, Virginia) is a public diplomacy specialist. He served as American ambassador to Latvia in the George W. Bush administration and he currently advises international media and audience analysis firm InterMedia Research Institute on strategic communication matters.

Carlson frequently speaks before public and civic groups across the country on public diplomacy and foreign affairs. He is a contributing author to the forthcoming Georgetown University Press book Mission Creep: The Militarization of U.S. Foreign Policy and co-author with Dr. Robert Banks of a 2014 study on the evaluation of diplomacy for the U.S. Department of State. He lectures on strategic communication at the National Defense University, the Naval, Air and Army War Colleges, and the National Foreign Affairs Training Center. He is a board member of the Public Diplomacy Council, the U.S. Baltic Foundation, and the Association of Crows Information Operations Committee.

Having first taken up flying in 2006, Carlson is now an FAA-certified commercial pilot with an instrument rating. Carlson is a partner in the Reston-based Decathlon LLC company which operates aerobatic aircraft at Leesburg Executive Airport. He flies a Cirrus SR-22 out of Leesburg, Virginia as well as tailwheel aircraft and gliders. Since joining Reston Runners in 1998, Carlson has completed nine marathons in cities such as New York, San Diego, Riga, Daugavpils, and Washington, DC.

From 2006 to 2010, Ambassador Carlson was the State Department's only liaison with the Department of Defense on strategic communication and public diplomacy matters. His work on inter-agency collaboration projects under the direction of three Under Secretaries of State for Public Diplomacy and Public Affairs – Karen Hughes, James K. Glassman and Judith McHale led to the award of the Joint Meritorious Civilian Service Award by the Chairman of the Joint Chiefs of Staff in May, 2010.

A 1969 graduate of Vanderbilt University, Brian Carlson served 36 years in the U.S. Foreign Service, rising to the rank of Career Minister. His foreign postings included stints in Latvia (as U.S. ambassador), Spain, England, Norway, Bulgaria, Yugoslavia and Venezuela. After retiring from the Foreign Service, Carlson led several inspection teams in the Middle East and Washington for the Inspector General of the U.S. Department of State and the Broadcasting Board of Governors.

Diplomatic posts
Preceded by James Howard Holmes	United States Ambassador to Latvia; 2001–2004	Succeeded by Catherine Todd Bailey
