= List of ambassadors of the United States to Latvia =

Ambassador of the United States to Latvia
- Seal of the United States Department of State

- Flag of a United States ambassador

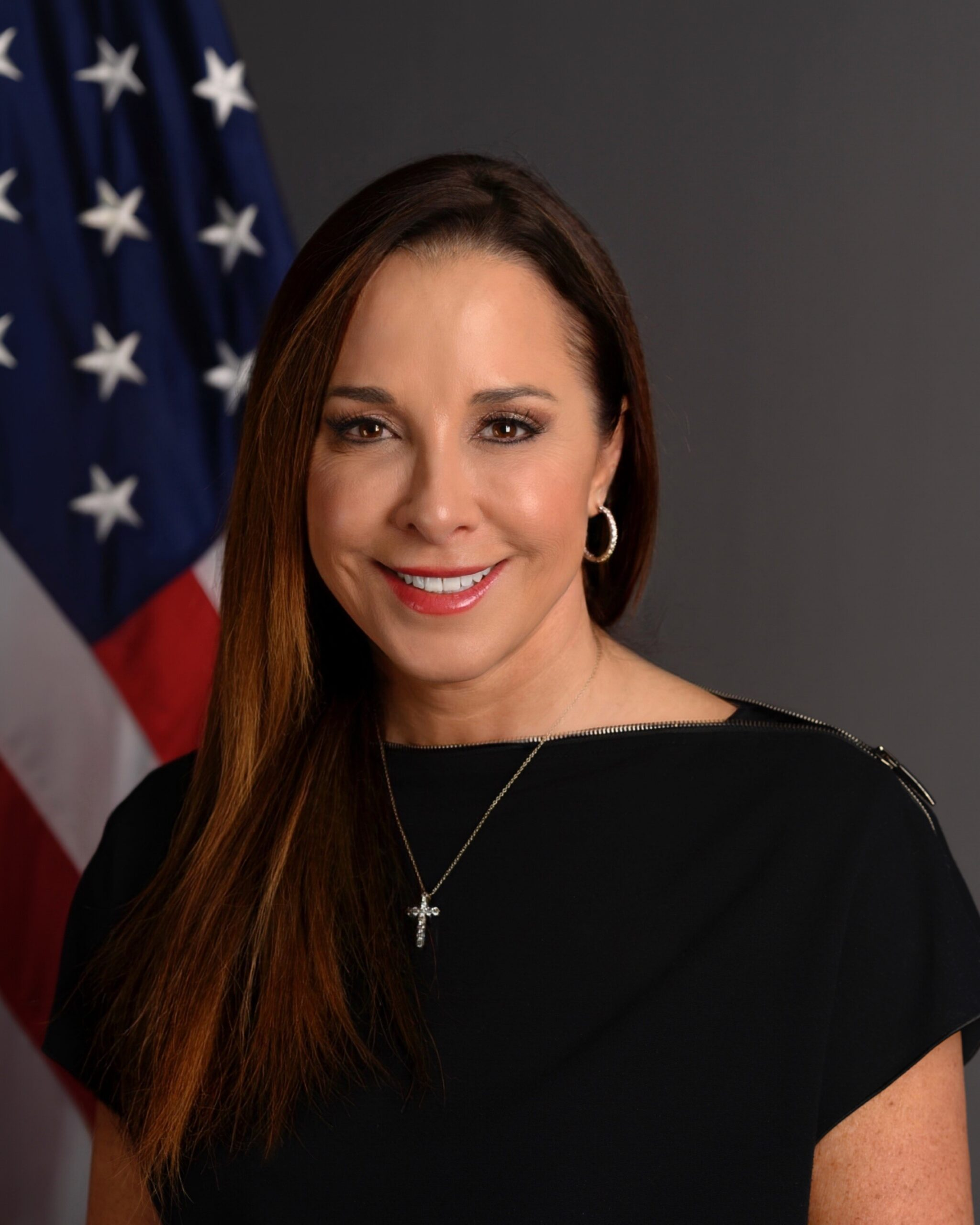
- Incumbent; Melissa Argyros since February 20, 2026
- Nominator: The president of the United States
- Appointer: The president with Senate advice and consent
- Inaugural holder: Frederick W.B. Coleman as Envoy Extraordinary and Minister Plenipotentiary
- Formation: September 20, 1922
- Website: U.S. Embassy - Riga

The United States first established diplomatic relations with the Baltic states (Latvia, Lithuania, Estonia) in 1922. One ambassador, resident in Riga, Latvia, was appointed to all three nations. Relations with the three nations were broken after the Soviet invasion of the republics in 1940 at the beginning of World War II. The United States never recognized the legitimacy of the Soviet occupation of the Baltic states, nor the legitimacy of the governments of those states under Soviet occupation. Hence, full diplomatic relations were not resumed until 1992 after the collapse of the Soviet Union.

The U.S. Embassy in Latvia is located in Riga.

== Ambassadors ==
Name	Title	Appointed	Presented credentials	Terminated mission	Notes
Frederick W. B. Coleman – Political appointee	Envoy Extraordinary and Minister Plenipotentiary	September 20, 1922	November 13, 1922	October 20, 1931	
Robert Peet Skinner – Career FSO	Envoy Extraordinary and Minister Plenipotentiary	September 23, 1931	January 28, 1932	April 29, 1933	
John Van Antwerp MacMurray – Career FSO	Envoy Extraordinary and Minister Plenipotentiary	August 28, 1933	December 13, 1933	February 12, 1936	
Arthur Bliss Lane – Career FSO	Envoy Extraordinary and Minister Plenipotentiary	January 24, 1936	July 2, 1936	September 16, 1937	
John C. Wiley – Career FSO	Envoy Extraordinary and Minister Plenipotentiary	July 18, 1938	October 6, 1938	June 17, 1940	
Soviet forces occupied Riga on June 17, 1940, which effectively ended the U.S. diplomatic presence in those nations. Ambassador Wiley departed Riga on July 25, 1940. Earl L. Packer was serving as Chargé d'Affaires ad interim when all U.S. diplomatic officials were withdrawn and the legation in Riga was officially closed on September 5, 1940. Semi-official diplomatic relations continue until 1992 through the Latvian Diplomatic Service.
The United States announced its readiness to reestablish full relations with Latvia on September 2, 1991. Embassy Riga was reestablished October 2, 1991 with Ints M. Siliņš as Chargé d'Affaires ad interim pending his appointment as ambassador.
Ints Siliņš – Career FSO	Ambassador Extraordinary and Plenipotentiary	March 23, 1992	April 10, 1992	July 14, 1995	
Larry C. Napper – Career FSO	Ambassador Extraordinary and Plenipotentiary	June 27, 1995	August 1, 1995	October 1, 1998	
James Howard Holmes – Career FSO	Ambassador Extraordinary and Plenipotentiary	August 4, 1998	August 27, 1998	September 15, 2001	
Brian E. Carlson – Career FSO	Ambassador Extraordinary and Plenipotentiary	November 5, 2001	December 4, 2001	December 6, 2004	
Catherine Todd Bailey – Political appointee	Ambassador Extraordinary and Plenipotentiary	November 29, 2004	February 4, 2005	February 4, 2008	
Charles W. Larson, Jr. – Political appointee	Ambassador Extraordinary and Plenipotentiary	January 7, 2008	February 12, 2008	January 20, 2009	
Judith G. Garber – Career FSO	Ambassador Extraordinary and Plenipotentiary	August 14, 2009	August 25, 2009	July 9, 2012	
Mark Pekala – Career FSO	Ambassador Extraordinary and Plenipotentiary	July 10, 2012	September 4, 2012	August 7, 2014	
Nancy Pettit – Career FSO	Ambassador Extraordinary and Plenipotentiary	July 29, 2015	September 8, 2015	July 14, 2019	
John Carwile – Career FSO	Ambassador Extraordinary and Plenipotentiary	September 30, 2019	November 5, 2019	January 27, 2023	
Christopher T. Robinson - Career FSO	Ambassador Extraordinary and Plenipotentiary	December 13, 2022	February 21, 2023	December 29, 2025	
Julia Jacoby - Career FSO	Chargé d'affaires ad interim	December 29, 2025		February 20, 2026	
Melissa Argyros - Political appointee	Ambassador Extraordinary and Plenipotentiary	December 18, 2025	February 20, 2026	Present	

== See also ==
- Latvia – United States relations
- Foreign relations of Latvia
- Ambassadors of the United States
