= Jonathan Henick =

American diplomat

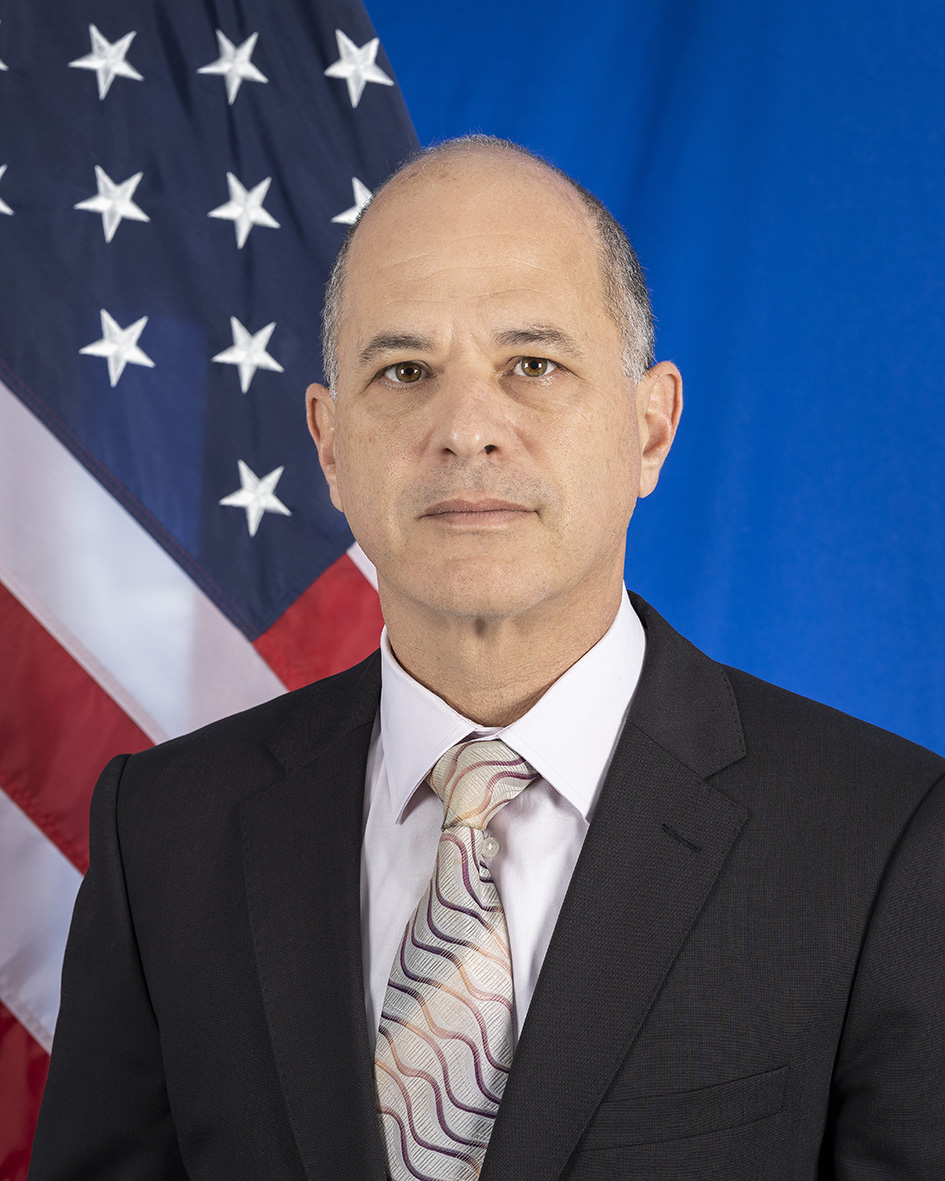

United States Ambassador to Uzbekistan
- Incumbent
- Assumed office November 24, 2022
- President: Joe Biden; Donald Trump
- Preceded by: Daniel N. Rosenblum

Personal details
- Education: Columbia University (BA, MA); University of Hawaii (PhD)

Jonathan Henick is an American diplomat who has served as the United States ambassador to Uzbekistan since 2022.

== Early life and education ==
Henick has a bachelor's degree from Columbia College, a Master of Arts in international affairs from Columbia University and a Doctor of Philosophy in political science from the University of Hawaii.

== Career ==
Henick is a career member of the Senior Foreign Service with the rank of minister-counselor. He served as the deputy assistant secretary in the Bureau of South and Central Asian Affairs, where he was responsible for the countries of Central Asia, as well as public diplomacy and press for all of South and Central Asia. He served as acting deputy coordinator of the Global Engagement Center where he helped to lead and coordinate U.S. efforts to counter disinformation from Russia, China, and Iran. Henick served as the principal deputy coordinator and acting coordinator for the Bureau of International Information Programs. His other assignments include serving as the minister counselor for public affairs in Turkey, the deputy chief of mission in Timor-Leste, as well as in other positions in Azerbaijan, Turkey, Portugal, and Uzbekistan. Henick has worked as a fellow and visiting professor at the George Washington University and as a Diplomat-in-Residence at the East-West Center in Honolulu, Hawaii. He was a visiting professor at the College of Information and Cyberspace of the National Defense University.

On May 20, 2022, President Joe Biden announced his intent to nominate Henick to serve as the United States ambassador to Uzbekistan. On May 24, 2022, his nomination was sent to the Senate. On July 27, 2022, a hearing on his nomination was held before the Senate Foreign Relations Committee. On August 3, 2022, his nomination was reported out of committee. On August 4, 2022, his nomination was confirmed in the United States Senate by voice vote. He was sworn into office on October 14. On November 24, 2022, he presented his credentials to President Shavkat Mirziyoyev.

=== Awards and honors ===
Henick has received the Public Diplomacy Alumni Association Achievement Award, as well as multiple State Department performance awards, including three Senior Foreign Service Performance Awards.

== Personal life ==
Henick is a native of New York. He speaks Russian, Portuguese, Turkish, and Azerbaijani.

== See also ==
- Ambassadors of the United States

Diplomatic posts
Preceded by Daniel N. Rosenblum	United States Ambassador to Uzbekistan; 2022–present	Incumbent
