= David M. Satterfield =

American diplomat (born 1954)

Ambassador David Satterfield
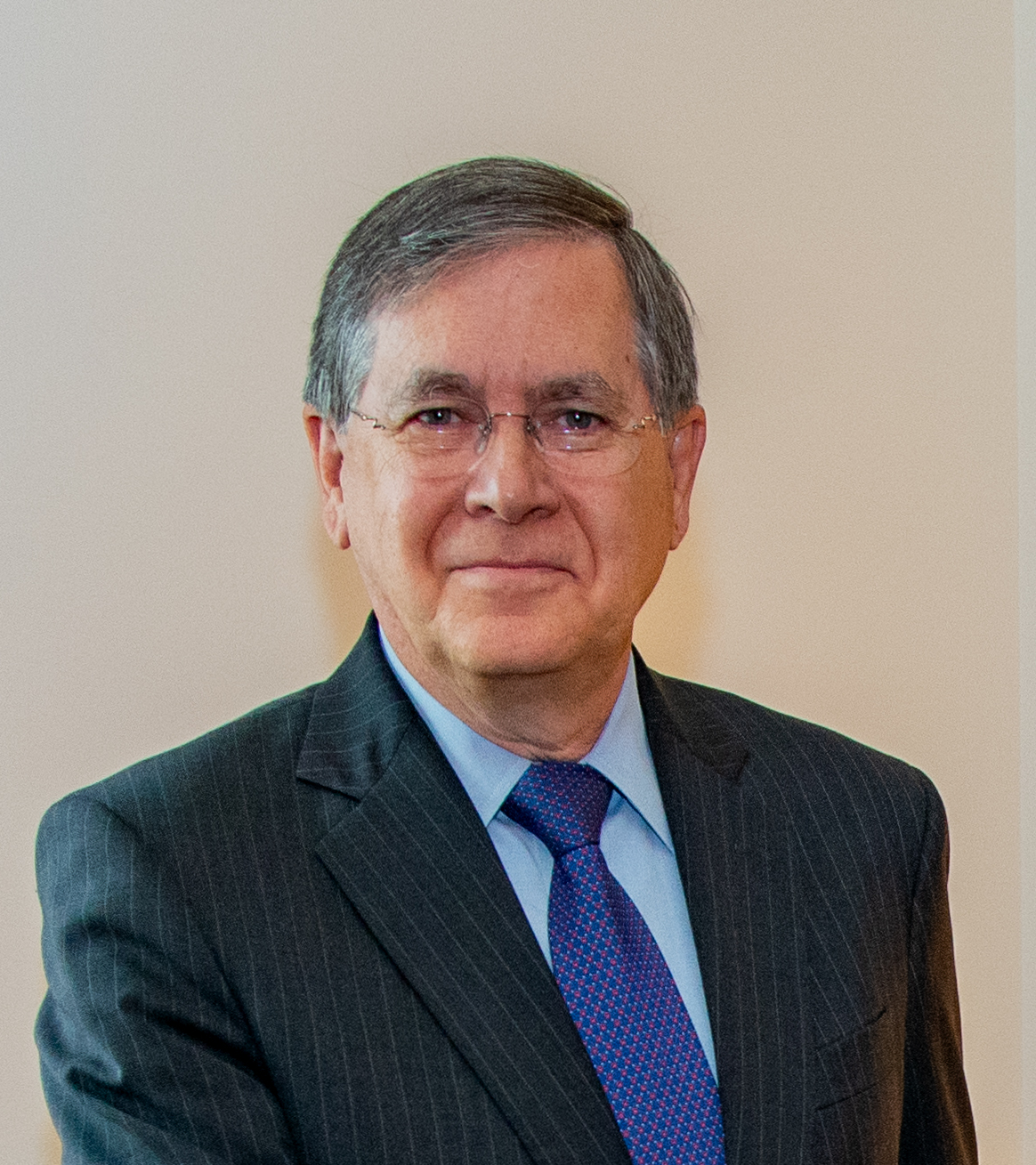
- Satterfield in 2019

Special Envoy for Middle East Humanitarian Issues
- In office October 15, 2023 – April 25, 2024
- President: Joe Biden
- Preceded by: Position created
- Succeeded by: Lise Grande

United States Ambassador to Turkey
- In office August 28, 2019 – January 7, 2022
- President: Donald Trump; Joe Biden
- Deputy: Scott M. Oudkirk
- Preceded by: John R. Bass
- Succeeded by: Jeff Flake

Acting Assistant Secretary of State for Near Eastern Affairs
- In office September 2017 – June 2019
- President: Donald Trump
- Preceded by: Anne W. Patterson
- Succeeded by: David Schenker

United States Ambassador to Lebanon
- In office September 23, 1998 – June 10, 2001
- President: Bill Clinton; George W. Bush
- Preceded by: Richard Henry Jones
- Succeeded by: Vincent M. Battle

Personal details
- Born: December 18, 1954 (age 71) Baltimore, Maryland, U.S.
- Spouse: Elizabeth Fritschle
- Education: University of Maryland, College Park (BA)

David Michael Satterfield (born December 18, 1954) is an American diplomat and ambassador, who has served extensively in the Middle East, including the Persian Gulf area, Lebanon, and Iraq. He later served as a senior advisor on Iraq for Secretary of State Condoleezza Rice and was director general of the Multinational Force and Observers, the peacekeeping force for the Sinai Peninsula from June 2009 until August 2017. He was chargé d'affaires to Egypt from August 2013 to January 2014 and was subsequently Special Advisor to the Secretary of State for Libya. From September 2017 to June 2019 he served as the acting assistant secretary of state for Near Eastern affairs, and was confirmed as U.S. ambassador to Turkey on June 27, 2019.

On February 15, 2019, President Donald Trump announced his intention to appoint Satterfield as the next United States Ambassador to Turkey, succeeding John Bass. On May 17, 2019, U.S. Senator Chuck Grassley placed a hold on Satterfield over a dispute with the State Department regarding a new terrorism bill. On June 27, 2019, Satterfield was confirmed by the Senate.

In January 2022, David Satterfield became the new U.S. envoy for the Horn of Africa, a position he held until June 2022. On May 31, Rice University announced that Satterfield would become the new director of Rice University's James A. Baker III Institute for Public Policy, succeeding Edward Djerejian.

During the Gaza war, Satterfield served as the inaugural Special Envoy for Middle East Humanitarian Issues from October 2023 to April 2024.

== Biography ==
Born in Baltimore, Maryland, Satterfield graduated from the University of Maryland, College Park, with a bachelor of arts in 1976.

He entered the Foreign Service in 1980, and has served overseas in Jeddah, Tunis, Beirut, Algiers, Damascus, and Baghdad. Director of the Department of State executive secretariat staff from 1990 to 1993, Satterfield served on the National Security Council staff from 1993 to 1996 as director for Near Eastern and South Asian Affairs. He held the position of director of the Department of State’s Office of Israel and Arab-Israeli Affairs from 1996 to 1998, and was the ambassador to Lebanon from September 1998 to June 2001.

The United States Senate confirmed Satterfield to succeed Edward William Gnehm Jr. as ambassador to Jordan, but shortly thereafter (on June 1, 2004) the secretary of state designated him principal deputy assistant secretary for Near Eastern Affairs (having served for the previous three years as NEA deputy assistant secretary), and in May 2005 he was sent to Iraq as deputy chief of mission with rank of ambassador. As a result, he never assumed his post in Jordan. On May 19, 2006, the Department of State announced Satterfield’s appointment as coordinator for Iraq and senior adviser to Secretary of State Condoleezza Rice.

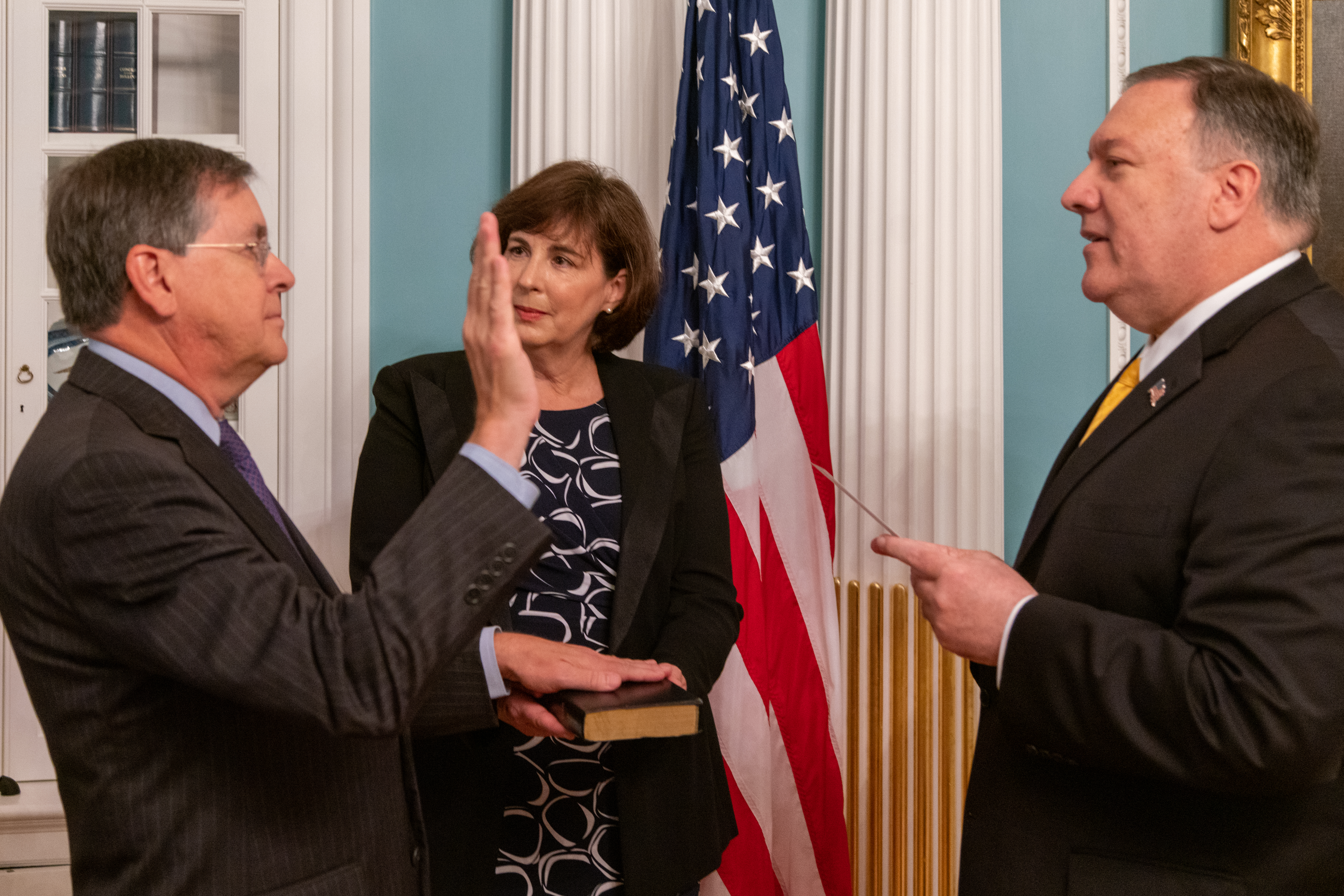
Satterfield sworn in by Mike Pompeo as US ambassador to Turkey in August 2019

In May 2009, Satterfield retired with the rank of career minister from his nearly thirty-year career in the Foreign Service. Upon nomination by the U.S. government, he was then appointed director general of the Multinational Force and Observers (MFO), an independent international organization, by the Arab Republic of Egypt and State of Israel, and assumed office on July 1, 2009. The MFO, whose mission is the implementation of the security provisions of the Egyptian-Israeli Treaty of Peace, is headquartered in Rome, with peacekeeping responsibilities in the Sinai. The director general is responsible for exercising his authority through his staff at the headquarters in Rome, the force commander and his staff in the Sinai, and the director general’s representatives and their staffs in Cairo and Tel Aviv. Satterfield returned to the Foreign Service and served as chief of mission in Cairo from August 2013 to January 2014 and was special advisor to the secretary of state for Libya from May to September 2014. On September 5, 2017, he returned to active duty as a senior foreign service officer and was appointed to serve as assistant secretary of state (acting) for Near Eastern Affairs.

On 10 January 2022, Satterfield was appointed U.S. special envoy for the Horn of Africa, replacing Jeffrey Feltman. Satterfield was replaced by Mike Hammer in June 2022; Satterfield left U.S. Government service on June 30, 2022.

Since July 1, 2022 Satterfield has been Director of Rice University's Baker Institute for Public Affairs, located on the Rice University campus in Houston.

In the aftermath of the October 7 attacks in Israel, Satterfield was appointed by President Biden on 15 October 2023 to the newly created position of Special Envoy for Middle East Humanitarian Issues to address the humanitarian crisis in Gaza. On 25 April 2024, Satterfield was replaced by Lise Grande.

After he left office, Satterfield said that Israel had the means and ability to distribute food, medicine, and aid to people in Gaza but that "the will" to do so had "never been present".

== Personal life ==
Satterfield speaks Arabic, French, and Italian.

== Awards ==
Ambassador Satterfield is the recipient of the:

- Presidential Distinguished Executive Rank Award;
- Presidential Meritorious Executive Rank Award;
- The Secretary of State's Distinguished Service Award (for Iraq service);
- Department of State Distinguished Honor Award;
- Four Department of State Superior Honor Awards, notably for his work on the Middle East peace process;
- Secretary of Defense Meritorious Civilian Service Award (for service as Ambassador to Turkey)
- Department of the Army Outstanding Civilian Service Award (for Iraq service)
- Department of the Army Civilian Award for Humanitarian Service
- Multinational Force and Observers (MFO) Distinguished Service for Peace Award

== See also ==
- List of current ambassadors of the United States

Diplomatic posts
Preceded by Richard Jones	United States Ambassador to Lebanon; August 1998 – September, 2001	Succeeded by Vincent M. Battle
Preceded by John R. Bass	United States Ambassador to Turkey; 2019–2022	Succeeded by Jeff Flake
