= Latvia–United States relations =

- Latvia: United States

Diplomatic mission
- Embassy of Latvia, Washington, D.C.: Embassy of the United States, Riga

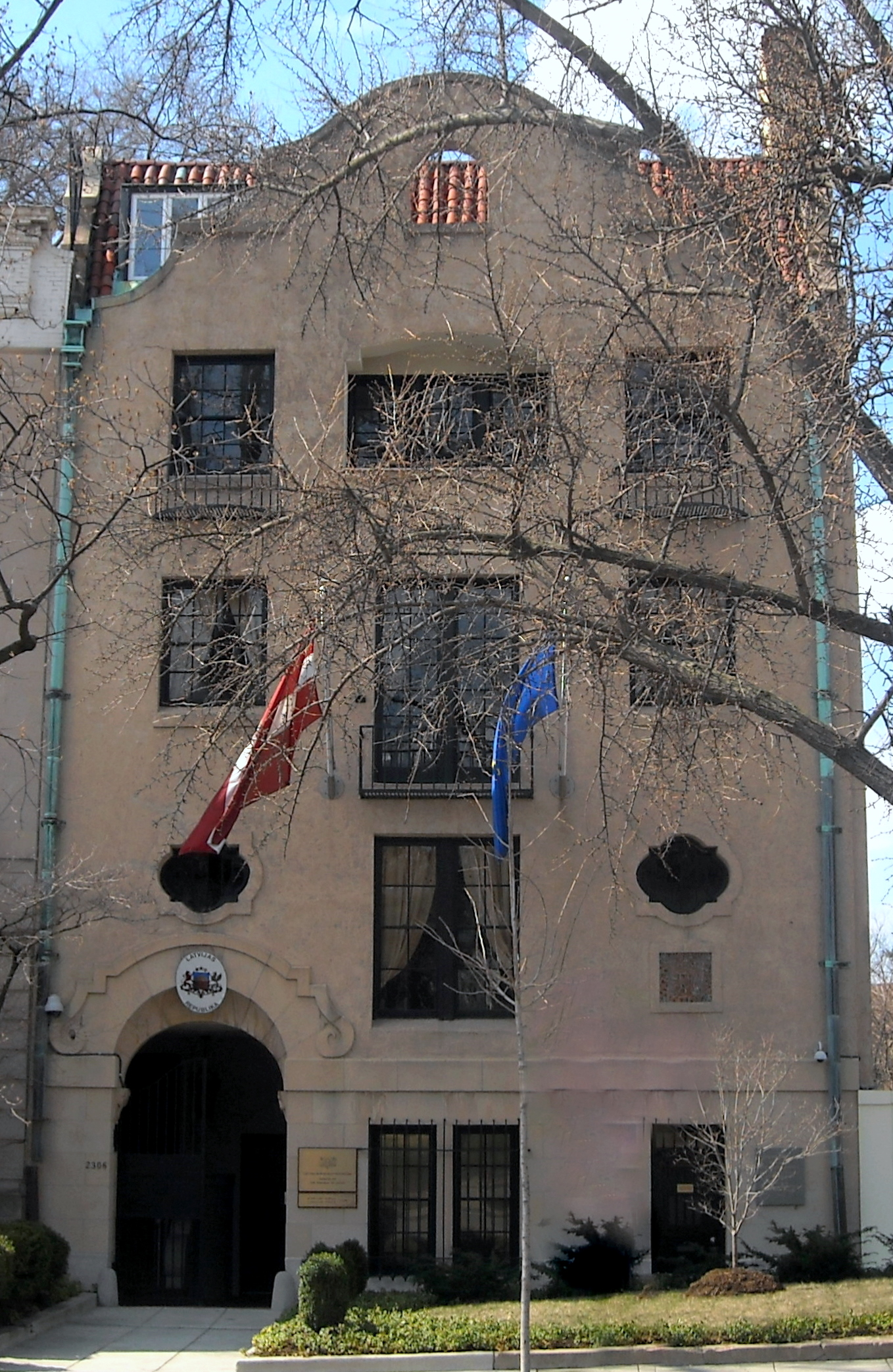
Embassy of Latvia in Washington, D.C.

The United States established diplomatic relations with Latvia on July 28, 1922. The U.S. Legation in Riga was officially established on November 13, 1922, and served as the headquarters for U.S. representation in the Baltics during the interwar era. The Soviet invasion forced the closure of the legation on September 5, 1940, but Latvian representation in the United States has continued uninterrupted for 85 years. The United States never recognized the forcible incorporation of Latvia into the USSR and views the present government of Latvia as a legal continuation of the interwar republic. Following the Dissolution of the USSR, Latvia and the United States re-established diplomatic relations on September 5, 1991.

Latvia and the United States have signed treaties on investment, trade, intellectual property protection, extradition, mutual legal assistance, and avoidance of double taxation. Latvia has enjoyed most-favored-nation treatment with the United States since December 1991.

According to the 2012 U.S. Global Leadership Report, 30% of Latvians approve of U.S. leadership, with 30% disapproving and 39% uncertain.

Principal U.S. Embassy Officials include:

- Ambassador— Nancy Bikoff Pettit
- Deputy Chief of Mission— Sharon Hudson-Dean

The U.S. Embassy in Latvia is located in Riga.

== Resident diplomatic missions ==
- Latvia has an embassy in Washington, D.C.
- the United States has an embassy in Riga.

== See also ==
- Latvian Americans
- Foreign relations of the United States
- Foreign relations of Latvia
- United States Ambassador to Latvia
