= Judith G. Garber =

American diplomat (1961–2024)

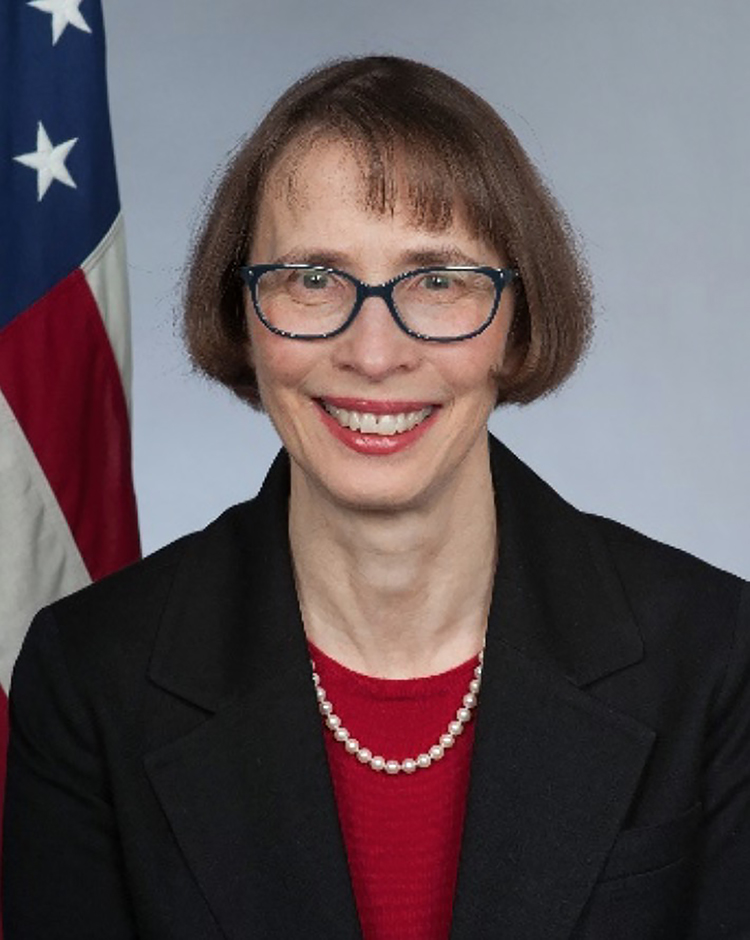

United States Ambassador to Cyprus
- In office March 18, 2019 – December 22, 2022
- President: Donald Trump; Joe Biden
- Preceded by: Kathleen A. Doherty
- Succeeded by: Julie D. Fisher

United States Ambassador to Latvia
- In office August 14, 2009 – July 9, 2012
- President: Barack Obama
- Preceded by: Charles W. Larson Jr.
- Succeeded by: Mark Pekala

Personal details
- Born: September 27, 1961
- Died: May 4, 2024 (aged 62)
- Spouse: Paul Wisgerhof
- Education: Georgetown University

Judith Gail Garber (September 27, 1961 – May 4, 2024) was an American diplomat who served as the United States ambassador to Cyprus from 2019 to 2022. She previously served as the United States ambassador to Latvia and as the acting assistant secretary for Oceans, Environment and Science at the State Department.

== Career ==
Garber was a career Foreign Service Officer since 1984. She was the ambassador to Latvia from 2009 to 2012, and prior to that served in a variety of foreign and domestic posts, including economic counselor in Madrid and director of North Central Europe in the Bureau of European and Eurasian Affairs. In August 2018, Garber was nominated by President Donald Trump to serve as the United States ambassador to Cyprus. Prior to becoming Ambassador to Cyprus, she served as acting Assistant Secretary for Oceans, Environment and Science at the Department of State.

== Personal life ==
Garber obtained her bachelor's degree in international economics from the Georgetown University Edmund A. Walsh School of Foreign Service. She was married with two children. Garber spoke Spanish, Hebrew, Czech and Latvian.

Garber died on May 4, 2024, at the age of 62.

Diplomatic posts
| Preceded by Charles W. Larson Jr. | United States Ambassador to Latvia; 2009–2012 | Succeeded by Mark Pekala |
| Preceded by Kathleen A. Doherty | United States Ambassador to Cyprus; 2019–2022 | Succeeded by Julie D. Fisher |
