= Larry C. Napper =

American diplomat

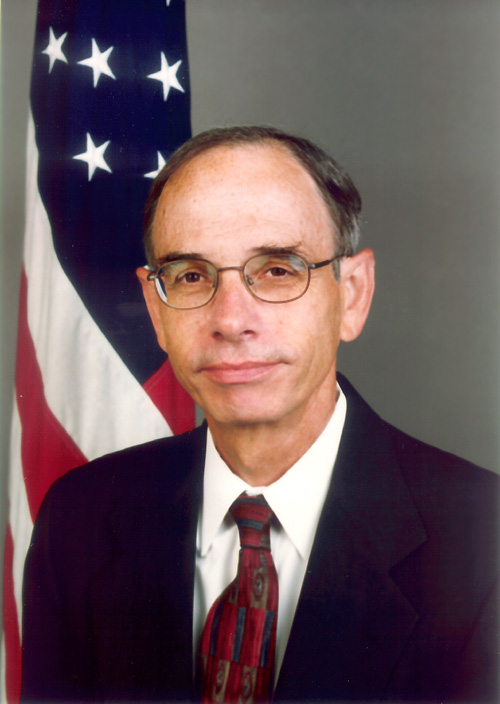

United States Ambassador to Kazakhstan
- In office August 20, 2001 – July 7, 2004
- President: George W. Bush
- Preceded by: Richard H. Jones
- Succeeded by: John Ordway

United States Ambassador to Latvia
- In office August 1, 1995 – October 1, 1998
- President: Bill Clinton
- Preceded by: Ints Siliņš
- Succeeded by: James Howard Holmes

Personal details
- Born: November 27, 1947 (age 78) San Antonio, Texas

Larry C. Napper (born November 27, 1947) served as the United States ambassador to Latvia from 1995 to 1998 and as the U.S. ambassador to Kazakhstan from 2001 to 2004.

Napper was born in San Antonio, Texas. After graduating from Texas A&M University in 1969 with a bachelor's degree in history, he served in the United States Army from 1969 to 1972. Following his honorable discharge from the Army at the rank of captain, Napper attended the University of Virginia from 1972 to 1974, earning a master's degree in government and foreign affairs. Napper entered the United States Foreign Service in August 1974.

After a year of Russian language training, Napper was assigned to the United States Embassy in Moscow, where he served as Vice Consul from 1975 to 1977. He then served as a Political Officer at the U.S. embassy in Gaborone, Botswana, from 1977 to 1979. Following a year of advanced training in Soviet and East European Affairs at Stanford University, Napper joined the Department's Office of Soviet Union Affairs where he served until 1983. In 1983–84, Napper received an American Political Science Association Congressional Fellowship in the office of Representative Lee H. Hamilton.

In 1984, Napper returned to Embassy Moscow for a two-year assignment as Chief of the Foreign Affairs Unit of the Political Section. From 1986 to 1988 he served as deputy director of the Department's Office of southern African Affairs. After six months of Romanian language training, Napper became Chargé d'affaires and later Deputy Chief of Mission of the U.S. Embassy in Bucharest, Romania from 1989 to 1991. He received the department's Distinguished Honor Award for leadership of the embassy during the December 1989 overthrow of the Ceausescu dictatorship.

From August 1991 to July 1994, Napper served as Director of the Department's Office of Soviet Union Affairs, reorganizing it as the Office of Independent States and Commonwealth Affairs following the collapse of the Soviet Union. During his tenure, the United States established diplomatic relations with each of the fifteen independent states that emerged from the Soviet Union, opening embassies in each of their capitals. Napper received the Presidential Meritorious Service Award in 1994, as well as other State Department individual and group awards.

Napper served as the U.S. ambassador to Latvia from July 1995 until July 1998. From July 1998 to June 2001, Napper was Coordinator for United States Assistance to Central and Eastern Europe, administering an assistance budget of more than $600 million.

Following his retirement from the foreign service, Napper took a position as senior lecturer at the George Bush School of Government and Public Service at Texas A&M University where he teaches courses on American diplomacy, foreign policy, and Russia. From 2009 to 2013, he served as the director of the Scowcroft Institute of International Affairs.

== See also ==
- Ambassadors of the United States

Diplomatic posts
Preceded by Ints M. Siliņš	United States Ambassador to Latvia; 1995–1998	Succeeded by James Howard Holmes
Preceded by Richard H. Jones	United States Ambassador to Kazakhstan; 2001–2004	Succeeded by John Ordway
