= List of ambassadors of the United States to Lebanon =

United States ambassador list

Ambassador of the United States to Lebanon
- السفارة الأمريكية في لبنان
- Seal of the United States Department of State

- Flag of a United States ambassador

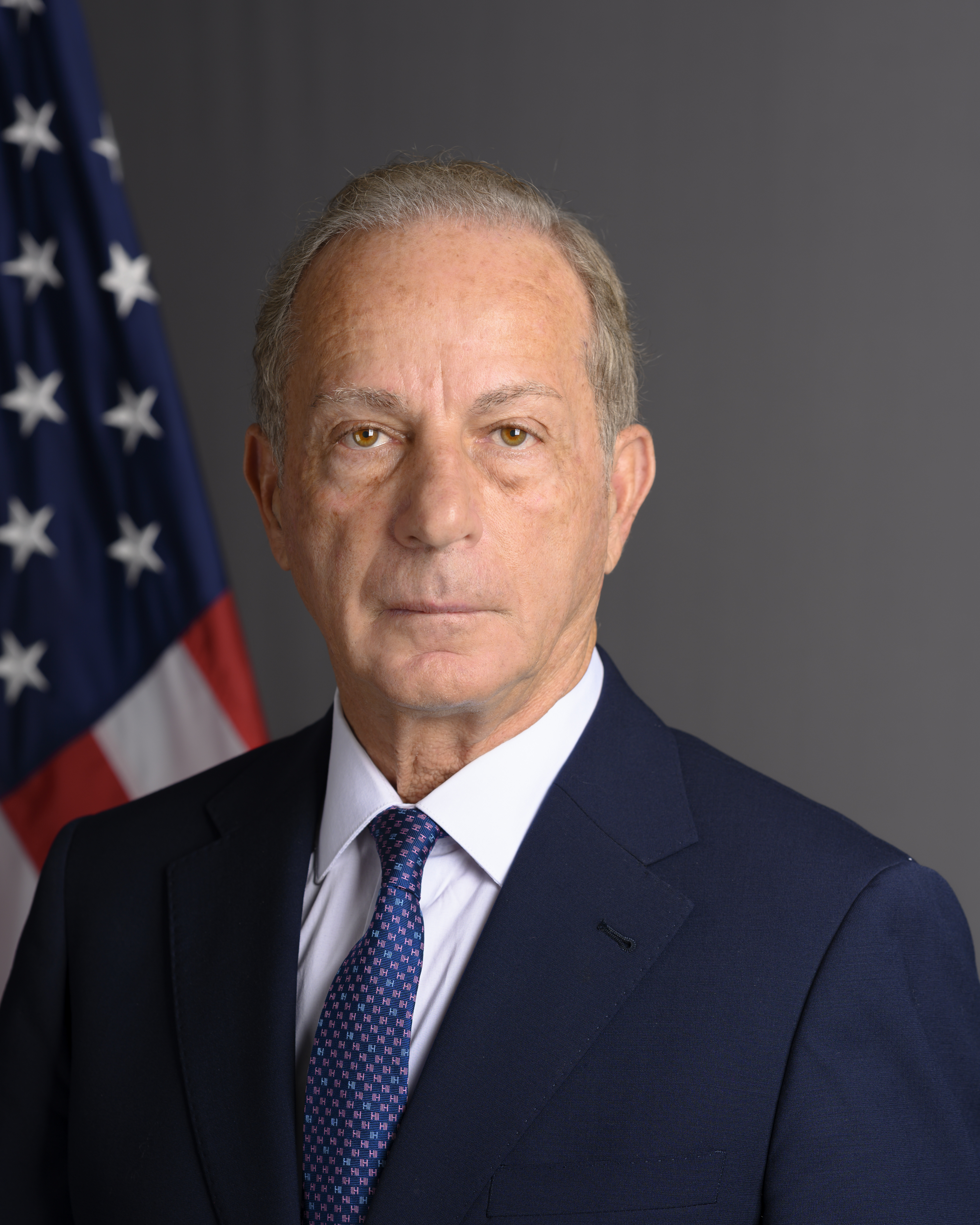
- Incumbent; Michel Issa since November 17, 2025
- Nominator: The president of the United States
- Appointer: The president with Senate advice and consent
- Inaugural holder: George Wadsworth as Consul General
- Formation: 1942
- Website: U.S. Embassy - Beirut

This is a list of ambassadors of the United States and other Heads of Mission to Lebanon.

- George Wadsworth (1942–1947) – Consul General, later promoted to Envoy. Also was head of mission to Syria but resident in Beirut.
- Lowell C. Pinkerton (1946–1951) – Envoy
- Harold B. Minor (1951–1953) – Envoy, promoted to first ambassador.
- Raymond A. Hare (1953–1954)
- Donald R. Heath (1955–1958)
- Robert McClintock (1958–1961)
- Armin H. Meyer (1961–1965)
- Dwight J. Porter (1965–1970)
- William B. Buffum (1970–1974)
- G. McMurtrie Godley (1974–1976)
- Francis E. Meloy, Jr. (1976) – Assassinated prior to presenting credentials.
- Richard B. Parker (1977–1978)
- John Gunther Dean (1978–1981)
- Robert Sherwood Dillon (1981–1983)
- Reginald Bartholomew (1983–1986)
- John Hubert Kelly (1986–1988)

On September 6, 1989, all United States personnel were withdrawn from Beirut during unrest resulting from there being no clear successor to President Amin Gemayel. Ambassador Ryan C. Crocker did not formally present his credentials until 1990 to René Moawad.

- John Thomas McCarthy (1988–1990)
- Ryan Clark Crocker (1990–1993)
- Mark Gregory Hambley (1993–1994)
- Vincent M. Battle (1994) – Charges d'Affaires ad interim.
- Ronald L. Schlicher (1994–1996) – Charges d'Affaires ad interim.
- Richard Henry Jones (1996–1998)
- David Michael Satterfield (1998–2001)
- Vincent M. Battle (2001–2004)
- Jeffrey D. Feltman (2004–2008)
- Michele J. Sison (2008–2010)
- Maura Connelly (2010–2013)
- David Hale (2013–2015)
- Richard Henry Jones (2015–2016) – Charges d'Affaires ad interim.
- Elizabeth Holzhall Richard (2016–2020)
- Dorothy Shea (2020–2023)
- Lisa A. Johnson (2024–2025)
- Keith Hanigan (2025) – Charges d'Affaires ad interim.
- Michel Issa (2025-)

== See also ==
- Embassy of the United States, Beirut
- Lebanon – United States relations
- Foreign relations of Lebanon
- Ambassadors of the United States
