= Melissa Argyros =

American ambassador to Latvia

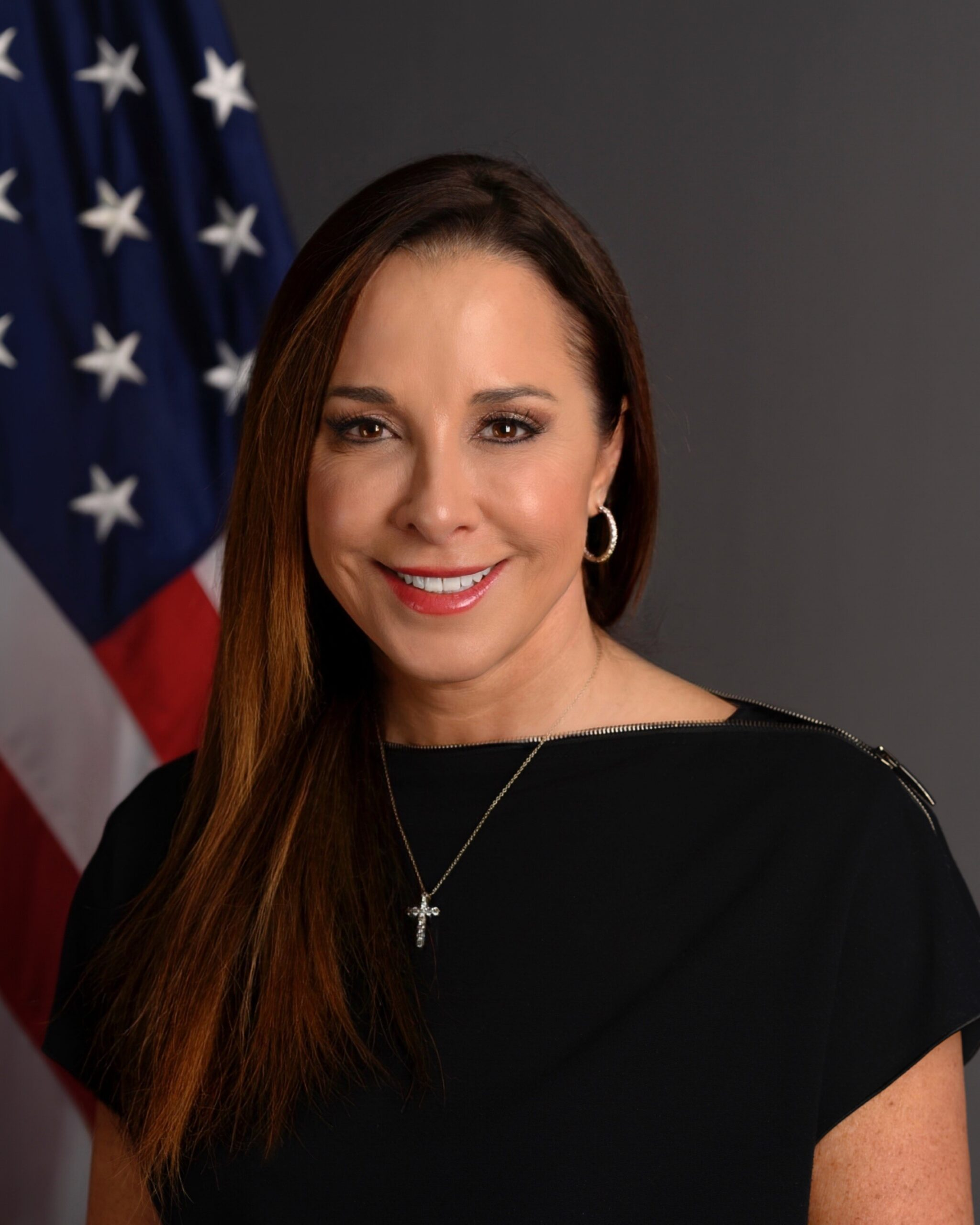

United States Ambassador to Latvia
- Incumbent
- Assumed office February 20, 2026
- President: Donald Trump
- Preceded by: Christopher T. Robinson

Personal details
- Party: Republican
- Parents: George Argyros (father); Julia Argyros (mother)
- Education: Chapman University (BA)

Melissa Argyros is an American real estate investor and diplomat who has served as United States ambassador to Latvia since 2026.

== Early life and education ==
Argyros is the daughter of billionaire George Argyros, who served as U.S. Ambassador to Spain under George W. Bush from 2001 to 2004. In 2007, she received a bachelor's degree from Chapman University, where her family later gifted $10,000,000 to open the Argyros College of Business and Economics in honor of her father.

== Philanthropic and political activity ==
Between 2024 and 2025, Argyros contributed more than $2,000,000 to the Trump Vance Inaugural Committee.

Argyros serves as co-CEO of the Argyros Family Foundation. She has been on the board of trustees for several political groups and nonprofits including the Richard Nixon Foundation, New Majority, Boy Scouts of America, Chapman University, and Orange County School of the Arts.

== Ambassadorship ==
In April 2025, President Donald Trump nominated Argyros to be United States ambassador to Latvia.

She was confirmed by the United States Senate on December 18, 2025, as part of an en bloc confirmation.

Argyros was sworn in as U.S. ambassador on January 12, 2026, and presented her credentials to President Edgars Rinkēvičs on February 20, 2026.

Diplomatic posts
Preceded by Christopher T. Robinson	United States Ambassador to Latvia; 2026–present	Incumbent
