= William Harrison Courtney =

American diplomat

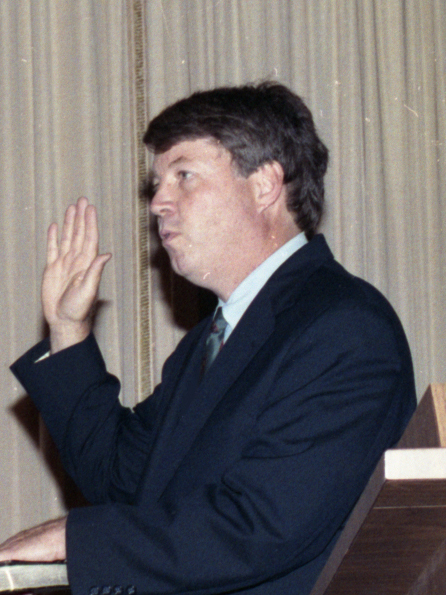
Swearing-in ceremony for William H. Courtney, Ambassador of the United States to Kazakhstan on August 20, 1992

William Harrison Courtney (born July 18, 1944) is a professor and a retired American diplomat and ambassador, having served in Kazakhstan, Georgia, among others.

== Education and personal life ==
Courtney graduated from West Virginia University in 1966 with a B.A in economics, and Brown University in 1980 with a Ph.D, also in economics.

Courtney was born in Baltimore. He grew up in Barboursville, West Virginia. He is married to Laryssa Courtney and has two adult children, Will and Alison. They live in Washington D.C.

== Career ==
William Courtney is an adjunct senior fellow at RAND and professor of policy analysis at the RAND School of Public Policy. From 2021 to 2025, he co-chaired the International Advisory Council of America250, the executive arm of the U.S. Semiquincentennial Commission. It inspires and facilitates commemorations of the 250th anniversary of the founding of the United States in 1776. In 2014, Ambassador Courtney joined RAND from Computer Sciences Corporation, where he was senior principal for federal policy strategy.

From 1972 through 1999 he was a foreign service officer in the U.S. Department of State. On August 11, 1992, President George H.W Bush appointed him to the position of Ambassador to Kazakhstan. He remained in that capacity until July 1, 1995. On August 14, 1995, the president, now Bill Clinton, appointed him to be Ambassador to Georgia. He stayed in that position until August 3, 1997. In addition, he was special assistant to the president for Russia, Ukraine, and Eurasia; deputy negotiator in U.S.-Soviet Defense and Space Talks; deputy executive secretary of the NSC staff; and special assistant to the Under Secretary of State for Political Affairs. He served abroad in Brasilia, Moscow, Geneva, Almaty, and Tbilisi.

Ambassador Courtney is chair-emeritus of the board of trustees of Eurasia Foundation. He is a member of the American Academy of Diplomacy and the Council on Foreign Relations, where in 1977–78 he was an international affairs fellow.

Diplomatic posts
Preceded by None (Position Created)	United States Ambassador to the U.S.-Soviet Bilateral Consultative Commission to implement the Threshold Test Ban Treaty	Succeeded by Robert G. Joseph
Preceded by None (Position Created)	United States Ambassador to Kazakhstan; 1992 – 1995	Succeeded by A. Elizabeth Jones
Preceded by Kent N. Brown	United States Ambassador to Georgia; 1995 – 1997	Succeeded by Kenneth Spencer Yalowitz
