= James Howard Holmes =

American diplomat

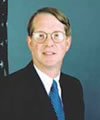

United States Ambassador to Latvia
- In office August 4, 1998 – September 15, 2001
- President: Bill Clinton; George W. Bush
- Preceded by: Larry C. Napper
- Succeeded by: Brian E. Carlson

Personal details
- Born: 1943 (age 82–83) Springfield, Virginia
- Education: Colgate University

James Howard Holmes (born April 1, 1943, Springfield, Virginia) is an American diplomat. He is the second son of the Rev. Robert Usher and Bertha Jeannette Cook Holmes. He is a 1965 graduate of Colgate University, as well as, a graduate of Johns Hopkins University School of Advanced International Studies, and the National War College. He joined the Foreign Service in 1967 and has served overseas in Pakistan, New Zealand, Norway, and Latvia. He is married and has two daughters and five grandchildren.

== Foreign Service Career ==
- 1984-1988 Director of the Office of Strategic Nuclear Policy in the Bureau of Political-Military Affairs.
- 1988-1992 Deputy Director of the Department of State's Policy Planning Staff with responsibilities for European policy.
- 1992-1995 Deputy Chief of Mission in the U.S. Embassy in Ankara, Turkey.
- 1995-1998 President's Coordinator for Assistance to Central and Eastern Europe responsible for assistance programs to fourteen Central European states, including start-up of the economic and reconstruction programs in Bosnia and Croatia.
- 1998-2001 U.S. Ambassador to Latvia.
- 2002–present Special Advisor for Southeast Europe in the Bureau of European and Eurasian Affairs at the Department of State.
- 2004-2014 President of the American-Turkish Council.

Diplomatic posts
Preceded by Larry C. Napper	United States Ambassador to Latvia; 1998–2001	Succeeded by Brian E. Carlson
