= Julie Stufft =

American diplomat

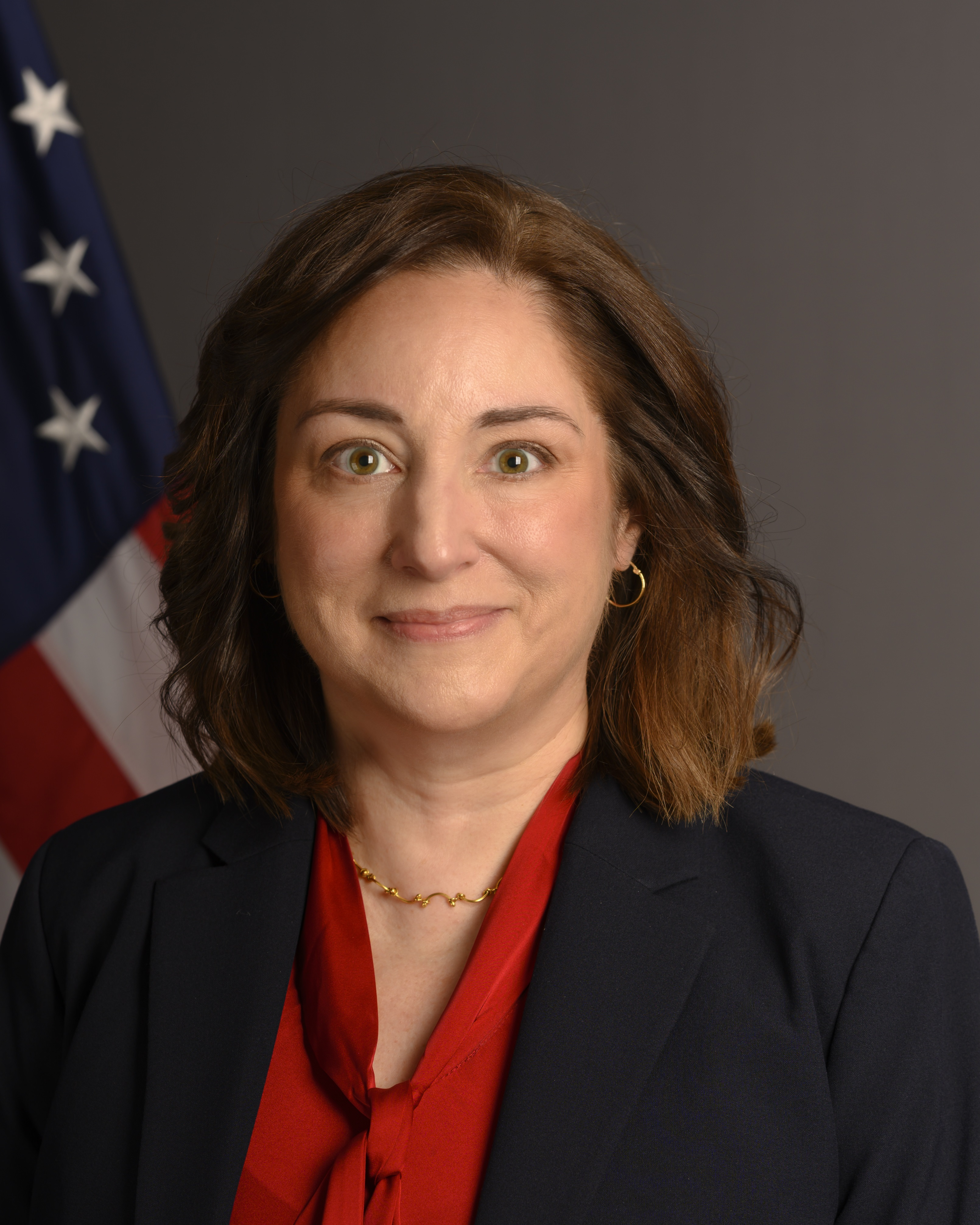
- Official portrait, 2025

United States Ambassador to Kazakhstan
- Incumbent
- Assumed office January 9, 2026
- President: Donald Trump
- Preceded by: Daniel N. Rosenblum

Personal details
- Born: Wayne County, Ohio, U.S.
- Education: Case Western Reserve University (BA); Duke University (BS)

Julie Stufft is an American public servant and diplomat who has served as the United States ambassador to Kazakhstan since 2026. She previously held the position of senior bureau official at the Bureau of Consular Affairs.

== Early life and education ==
Stufft is from Wayne County, Ohio. Stufft holds B.A. and B.S. degrees from Case Western Reserve University and a master’s degree from Duke University.

== Career ==
Stufft served as senior bureau official for Bureau of Consular Affairs until February 2025. On July 9, 2025, she was nominated to serve as U.S. ambassador to Kazakhstan. The Senate Committee on Foreign Relations held a hearing on her nomination in July 2025.

Stufft speaks English, Russian, Romanian, French, and Polish.
