= Nancy B. Pettit =

American diplomat (born 1953)

Nancy Bikoff Pettit
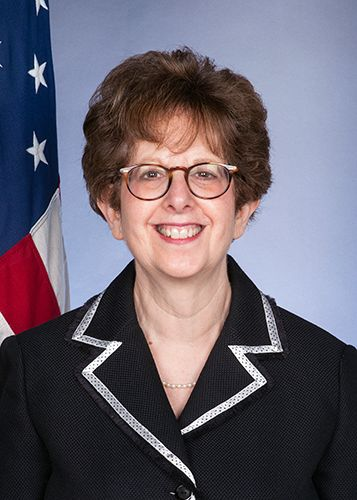

United States Ambassador to Latvia
- In office September 8, 2015 – July 14, 2019
- President: Barack Obama; Donald Trump
- Preceded by: Mark Pekala
- Succeeded by: John Carwile

Personal details
- Born: 1953 (age 72–73) New York, U.S.
- Spouse: James Pettit
- Education: Vassar College; University of Michigan

Nancy Bikoff Pettit (born 1953) is an American diplomat and served as Ambassador of the United States of America to Latvia from 2015 until July 14, 2019.

== Early life and education ==
Pettit was born Nancy Lois Bikoff to Florence Muriel Aaron Bikoff and David M. Bikoff. Her father was a physician and clinical assistant professor of family practice at the State University of New York at Stony Brook, L.I. She grew up in Patchogue, New York and graduated from Patchogue-Medford High School in 1971. In 2016 her hometown honored her with induction to the Patchogue-Medford Hall of Fame. Pettit earned her A.B. degree at Vassar in 1975, and then attended the University of Michigan, alma mater of her mother and father where she earned an M.A. in 1977.

== Career ==
Following her graduate studies, Pettit worked for as a research assistant at the Library of Congress and at the U.S. Board for International Broadcasting.

She then embarked on a career in the Foreign Service. Her first post was as an assistant in the Office of Cultural Affairs at the U.S. Embassy in Moscow in 1983. In 1986, she was posted to the American Institute in Taiwan (AIT) as a consular officer. In 1988 Pettit returned to Washington to work on the Soviet desk in the European Bureau of the State Department. After two years she became an analyst in the Office of Soviet Union Affairs in the Bureau of Intelligence and Research.

In 1992, Pettit was named a political officer in Moscow embassy. She returned to Washington in 1994 as a desk officer in the Office of Regional Affairs' Near East Bureau. After two years there, Pettit joined the department's Board of Examiners. In 1998 she became an international relations officer in the Office of Newly Independent States.

In 1999, she was assigned as a political officer in the U.S. Embassy in Vienna, Austria. She returned to Moscow from 2003 to 2007. In 2008, Pettit was made information officer in the Embassy in Kyiv, Ukraine. She returned to Washington in 2010 as director of the Office of Policy Planning and Coordination in the Bureau of International Narcotics and Law Enforcement.

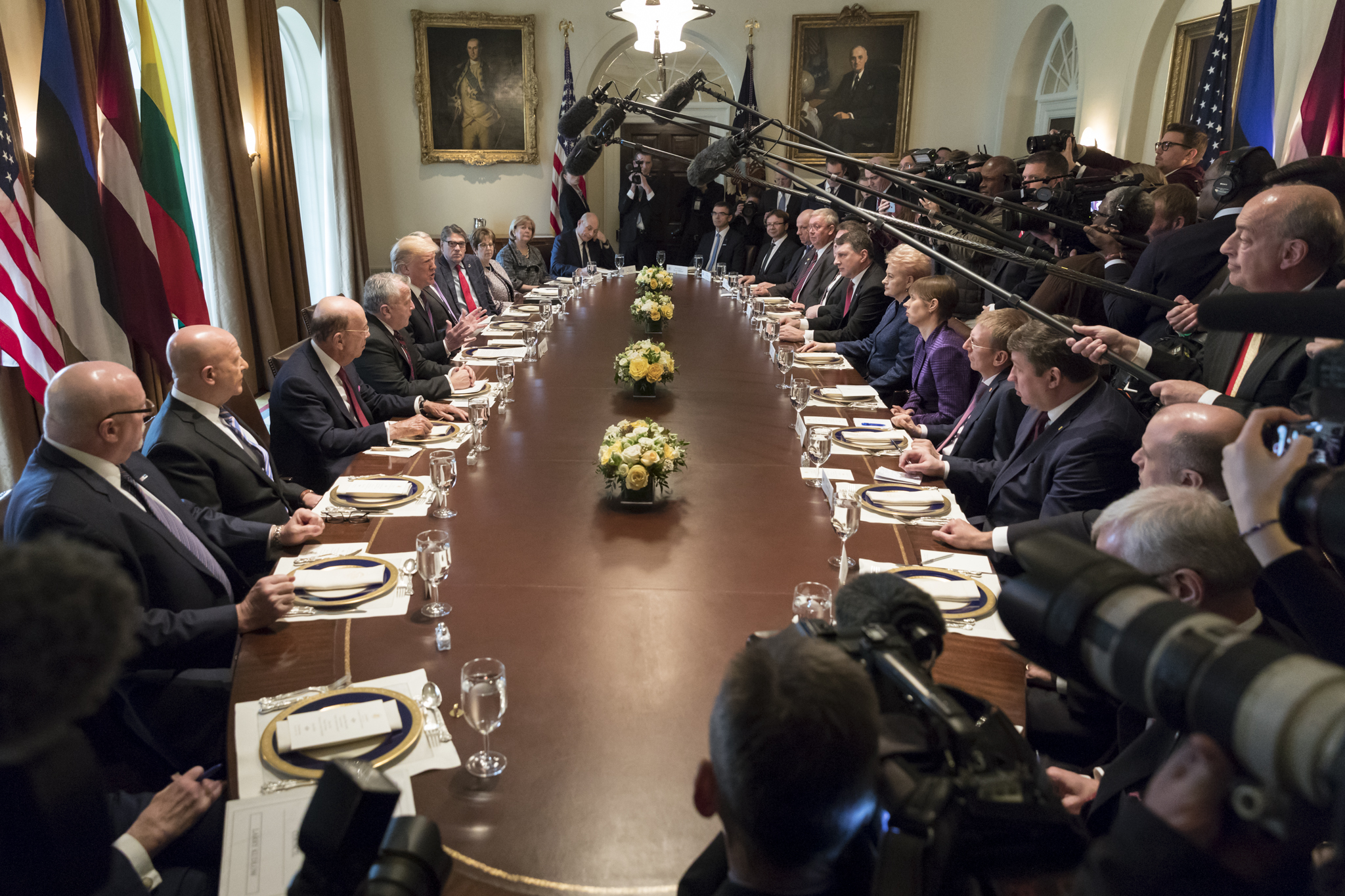
Pettit with President of the United States Donald Trump, President of Latvia Raimonds Vejonis, President of Estonia Kersti Kaljulaid & President of Lithuania Dalia Grybauskaite in Tuesday, April 3, 2018, in Washington, D.C. (26364837337)

Following her nomination by President Barack Obama, Pettit was confirmed by the Senate on June 24, 2015, as the Ambassador to the Republic of Latvia. She presented her credentials to the president of Latvia on September 8, 2015. In her role as ambassador she has voiced assurances that the United States will stand by its NATO commitments, and welcomed U.S. General Philip Breedlove as he completed a tour through the Baltics and Poland, and joined her in thanking U.S. and Latvian troops for their service.

Pettit completed her service as U.S. Ambassador to Latvia on July 14, 2019.

== Personal life ==
In addition to English, Pettit speaks Russian, Ukrainian, German, and Spanish. In 1981 she married James D. Pettit, previously U.S. Ambassador to the Republic of Moldova. The couple have two grown children.

Diplomatic posts
Preceded by Mark Pekala	United States Ambassador to Latvia; 2015–2019	Succeeded by John Carwile
