= Vincent M. Battle =

American diplomat (1940–2026)

Vincent Martin Battle (1940 – October 2026) was an American diplomat who was the United States ambassador to Lebanon from August 13, 2001 to August 16, 2004.

== Life and career ==
The Teaneck, New Jersey, native received his bachelor's degree from Georgetown University and his master's degree (1967) and Ph.D. from Columbia University (1974).

Battle joined the Foreign Service in 1977. Prior to entering the Foreign Service, Battle worked in Uganda for 10 years, as well as in Pakistan and Libya. After completing entry training, he began his career as a consular officer in Manama, Bahrain, serving there from 1977 to 1979. He continued with the Bureau of Near Eastern Affairs, serving as a consular officer in Damascus, Syria from 1980 to 1983 and as a political officer in Muscat, Oman from 1983 to 1985. He spoke Arabic.

From 1985 to 1988, Battle was head of the Immigrant Visa section in Port-au-Prince, Haiti. From 1987 to 1989, he had his first stint as a career development assignments (CDA) officer for consular officers.

In 1989, he returned to the Middle East as head of the Consular Section in Cairo from 1989 to 1991 and as deputy chief of mission in Beirut, from 1991 to 1994. Returning to Washington, D.C., in 1994, he became the chief of the Senior Level Division in CDA.

Well-versed in Middle Eastern Affairs, he was asked to rejoin the embassy in Cairo as deputy chief of mission, where he served from 1996 to 1999. In September 1999, he became the director of the Office for Career Development and Assignments, in the newly named Bureau of Human Resources. He later spent his retirement in Beirut, where died in October 2026.

Diplomatic posts
Preceded by Mark Gregory Hambley	United States Ambassador to Lebanon; Acting; September 1994 – October 1994	Succeeded by Ronald L. Schlicher; Acting
Preceded by David Michael Satterfield	United States Ambassador to Lebanon; 2001–2004	Succeeded by Jeffrey D. Feltman
