= Mark A. Pekala =

American diplomat (born 1959)

Mark Andrew Pekala
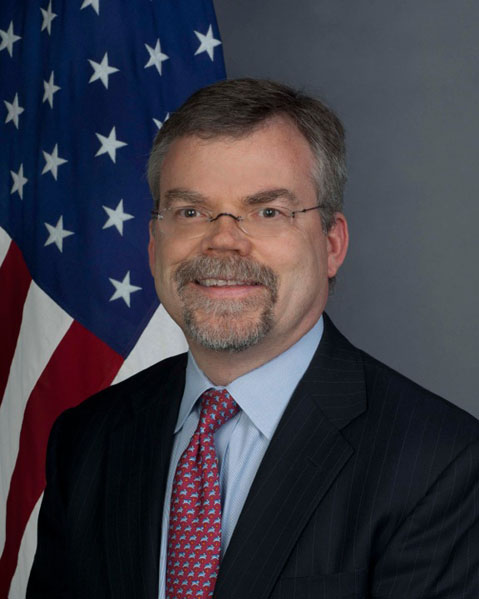

United States Ambassador to Latvia
- In office July 10, 2012 – July 29, 2015
- President: Barack Obama
- Preceded by: Judith G. Garber
- Succeeded by: Nancy Pettit

Personal details
- Born: August 21, 1959 (age 67) Michigan, U.S.
- Spouse: Maria Rosaria Pekala
- Education: University of Michigan; Columbia University (master's degree in international affairs and Master of Philosophy degree in political science)

Mark Andrew Pekala (born August 21, 1959) is a career foreign service officer who served as United States Ambassador to Latvia from 2012 to 2014, succeeding Judith G. Garber and being succeeded by Nancy Pettit.

He's been married to fellow career diplomat Maria Rosaria Pekala (born Alongi) since 2000. He speaks French, Estonian, Polish and Russian.

Diplomatic posts
Preceded by Judith G. Garber	United States Ambassador to Latvia; 2012–2015	Succeeded by Nancy Pettit
