= Christopher T. Robinson =

American diplomat

Christopher Todd Robinson
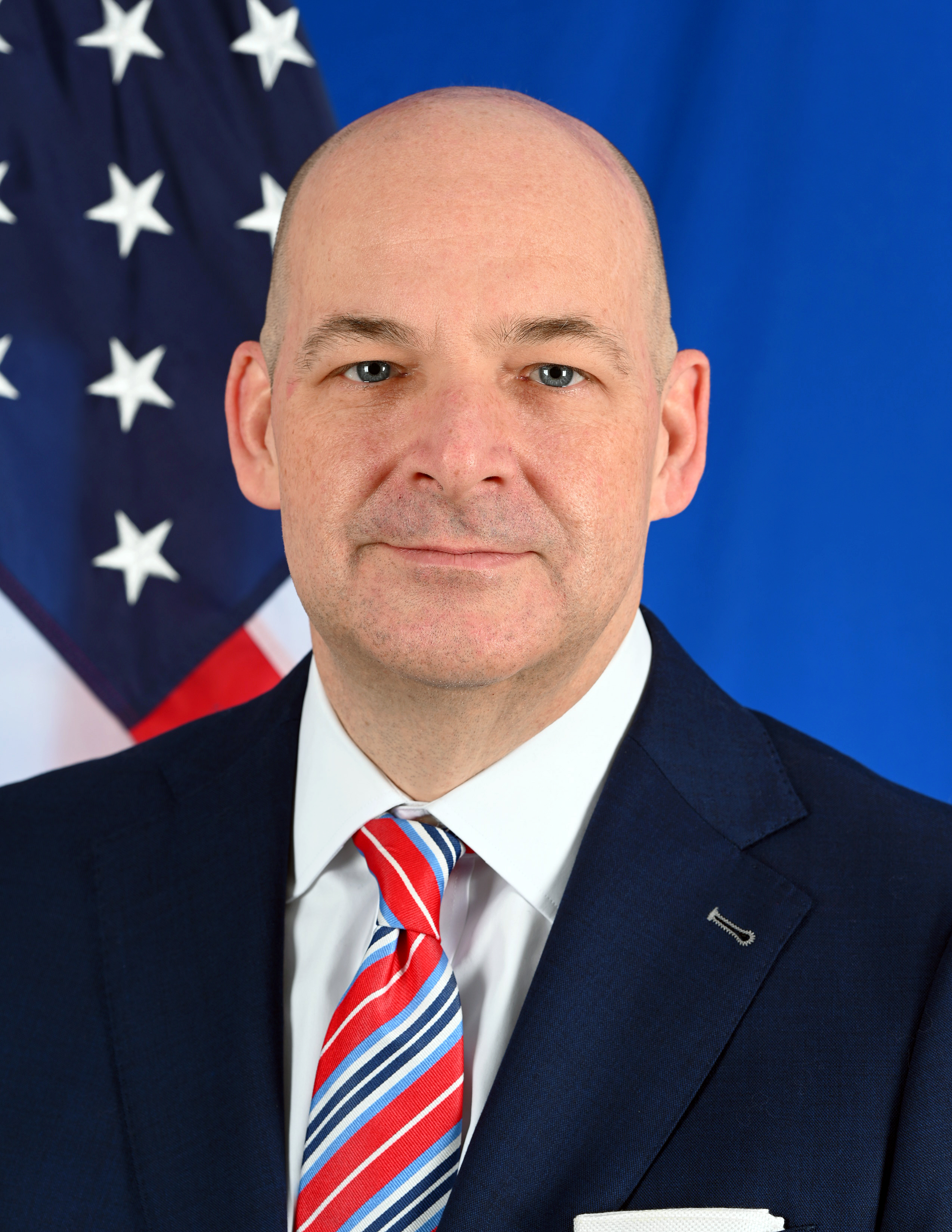

United States Ambassador to Latvia
- In office February 21, 2023 – December 29, 2025
- President: Joe Biden; Donald Trump
- Preceded by: John Carwile
- Succeeded by: Melissa Argyros

Personal details
- Education: National War College (MS); George Washington University (BA)

Christopher Todd Robinson is an American diplomat who had served as the United States ambassador to Latvia.

== Early life and education ==
Robinson received a Master of Science in strategic studies from the National War College and a Bachelor of Arts in international affairs from George Washington University.

== Career ==
Robinson is a career member of the Senior Foreign Service with the rank of Minister-Counselor. He has served as Deputy Assistant Secretary in the Bureau of European and Eurasian Affairs since 2018. Robinson previously was Minister Counselor for Political Affairs at U.S. Embassy in Moscow, Russia. He also served as deputy director for Russian Affairs at the State Department, as Political Counselor at the U.S. Mission to the Organization for Security and Cooperation in Europe (OSCE) in Vienna, Austria, and as Political Counselor in Managua, Nicaragua. His overseas assignments include Iraq, Belarus, Canada, and Russia; he has also had assignments in the Bureau of Western Hemisphere Affairs and the Bureau of European Affairs.

=== U.S. ambassador to Latvia ===
On June 15, 2022, President Joe Biden nominated Robinson to be the next ambassador to Latvia. On November 29, 2022, Hearings on his nomination were held before the Senate Foreign Relations Committee. On December 7, 2022, the committee favorably reported his nomination to the Senate. On December 13, 2022, his nomination was confirmed in the Senate by voice vote. He was sworn in on January 26, 2023, and presented his credentials to President Egils Levits on February 21, 2023.

Robinson's successor, Melissa Argyros, was confirmed as the next ambassador to Lativia by the United States Senate on December 18, 2025 as part of an en bloc confirmation.

== Awards and recognitions ==
Robinson is the recipient of multiple State Department performance awards, including a Distinguished Honor Award and Meritorious Honor Award.

== Personal life ==
Robinson speaks Russian and Spanish.

Diplomatic posts
| Preceded by John Carwile | United States Ambassador to Latvia; 2023–2025 | Succeeded by Melissa Argyros |
