= Daniel N. Rosenblum =

American diplomat

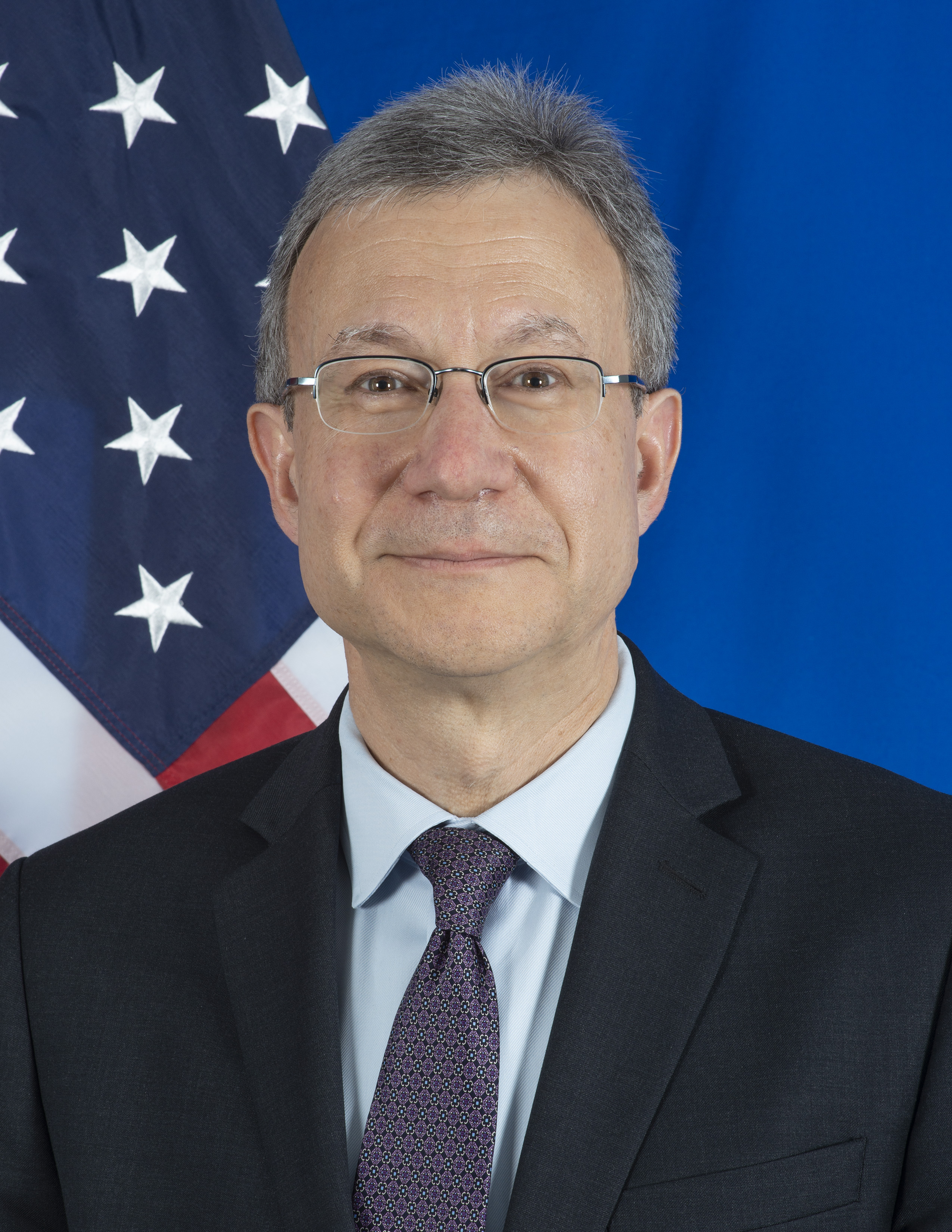

United States Ambassador to Kazakhstan
- In office November 14, 2022 – January 20, 2025
- President: Joe Biden
- Preceded by: William H. Moser
- Succeeded by: Julie Stufft

United States Ambassador to Uzbekistan
- In office May 24, 2019 – August 30, 2022
- President: Donald Trump; Joe Biden
- Preceded by: Pamela L. Spratlen
- Succeeded by: Jonathan Henick

Personal details
- Education: Yale University (BA); Paul H. Nitze School of Advanced International Studies (MA)

Daniel Nathan Rosenblum is an American diplomat who had served as the United States ambassador to Kazakhstan. He formerly served as the United States ambassador to Uzbekistan from 2019 to 2022.

== Early life and education ==
Rosenblum earned a Bachelor of Arts in history, summa cum laude, from Yale University and a Master of Arts in Soviet Studies and International Economics from the Paul H. Nitze School of Advanced International Studies.

== Career ==
For more than two decades, Rosenblum has served in senior United States Government positions managing people and resources, leading negotiations, building consensus, and communicating publicly about United States Government policy toward the countries of Central and Eastern Europe, Eurasia, and Central Asia. Rosenblum has put together billion-dollar aid packages to stabilize and rebuild countries in crisis, organized and led inter-agency teams in support of counter-terrorism goals, and forged strong diplomatic ties with key United States partners in Central Asia. Previously, he served as a senior program coordinator for the Free Trade Union Institute, a legislative assistant to United States Senator Carl Levin, and a research assistant in the House of Lords in London. From 2014 to 2019, he served as deputy assistant secretary of state in the Bureau of South and Central Asian Affairs.

=== United States ambassador to Uzbekistan ===
On June 18, 2018, President Donald Trump announced his intent to nominate Rosenblum to be the next United States Ambassador to Uzbekistan. Hearings on his nomination were held before the Senate Foreign Relations Committee on August 23, 2018. The committee favorably reported his nomination to the Senate floor on September 18, 2018. The Senate did not act on his nomination for the rest of the year and was returned to President Trump on January 3, 2019.

Rosenblum's nomination was resent on January 16, 2019. The committee favorably reported his nomination to the Senate floor on April 3, 2019. His nomination was confirmed in the United States Senate by voice vote on April 11, 2019. He was sworn into office on May 9, 2019. He presented copies of his credentials to Minister of Foreign Affairs Abdulaziz Kamilov on May 24, 2019. His tenure as ambassador ended around August 2022.

=== United States ambassador to Kazakhstan ===
On June 3, 2022, President Joe Biden announced his intent to nominate Rosenblum to be the next United States ambassador to Kazakhstan. On July 27, 2022, hearings on his nomination were held before the Senate Foreign Relations Committee. His nomination was favorably reported by the committee on August 4, 2022. Rosenblum was confirmed by the Senate the following day, August 5, 2022 by voice vote. Rosenblum presented his credentials to President Kassym-Jomart Tokayev on November 14, 2022.

== Personal life ==
His parents were Louis and Evelyn Rosenblum. His father worked for NASA for 30 years. Rosenblum speaks Russian.

== See also ==
- Ambassadors of the United States

Diplomatic posts
Preceded by Pamela L. Spratlen	United States Ambassador to Uzbekistan; 2019–2022	Succeeded by Jonathan Henick
Preceded by William H. Moser	United States Ambassador to Kazakhstan; 2022–2025	Succeeded by Julie Stufft
