= A. Elizabeth Jones =

American diplomat (born 1948)

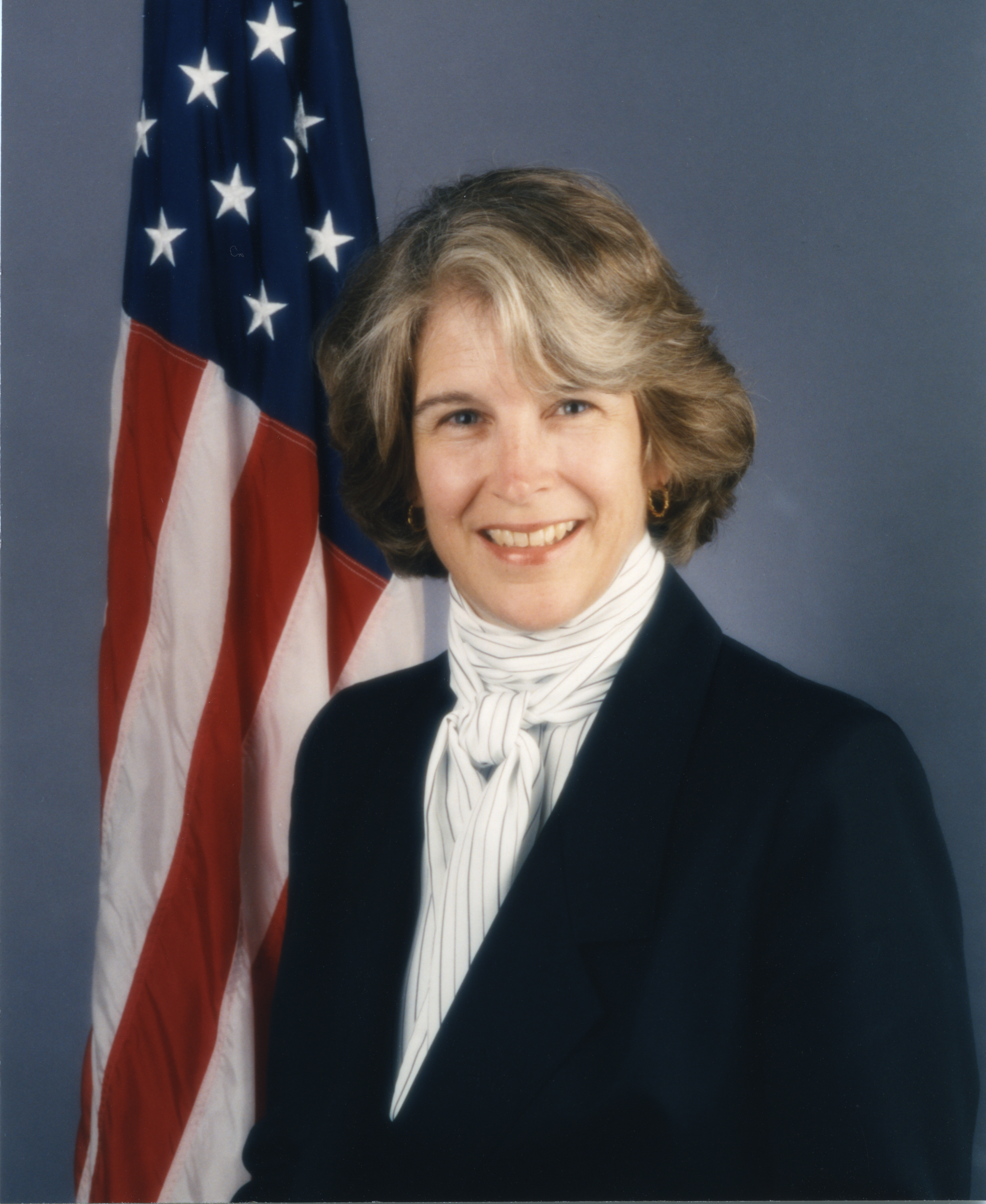
- Official portrait, 1995

U.S. Chargée d'affaires to India
- In office October 24, 2022 – April 11, 2023
- President: Joe Biden
- Preceded by: Patricia A. Lacina
- Succeeded by: Eric Garcetti

22nd Assistant Secretary of State for European and Eurasian Affairs (Note: Assistant Secretary of State for European Affairs until August 8, 2001.)
- In office June 1, 2001 – February 28, 2005
- President: George W. Bush
- Preceded by: James Dobbins
- Succeeded by: Daniel Fried

United States Ambassador to Kazakhstan
- In office October 18, 1995 – October 12, 1998
- President: Bill Clinton
- Preceded by: William H. Courtney
- Succeeded by: Richard H. Jones

Personal details
- Born: 1948 (age 77–78) Munich, West Germany (current-day Germany)
- Education: Swarthmore College; Boston University

A. Elizabeth Jones (born 1948) is an American diplomat and government official who served as the United States Ambassador to Kazakhstan from 1995 to 1998 and Assistant Secretary of State for European and Eurasian Affairs from 2001 to 2005. She was promoted to the rank of Career Ambassador in 2004. Jones served as Chargé d'Affaires to India from 2022 to 2023. She had served Chargé d'Affaires to Egypt from October 9, 2023, to November 15, 2023.

== Early life and education ==
Jones was born in Munich to parents in the U.S. Foreign Service. She grew up in Moscow and Berlin, where she attended local schools. She is a graduate of Swarthmore College and Boston University.

== Terrorism in Central Asia ==
Jones testified as Assistant Secretary of State on the threat of terrorism in Central Asia before the United States House of Representatives' subcommittee on the Middle East and Central Asia on 29 October 2003. Jones said the greatest threats to the Central Asian states are the Islamic Movement of Uzbekistan, which she described as an Islamic terrorist organization, as well as Hizb ut-Tahrir, which praises attacks on U.S. troops in Iraq. She said that despite the death of IMU leader Juma Namangani, the "IMU is still active in the region – particularly in Kyrgyzstan, Tajikistan, Uzbekistan, and Kazakhstan – and it represents a serious threat to the region and therefore to our interests."

== Post-retirement career ==
In 2022, Jones was appointed Chargé d'affaires ad interim at the U.S. Embassy in New Delhi until her succession by Eric Garcetti in March 2023.

== Notes ==
Diplomatic posts
Preceded by William H. Courtney	United States Ambassador to Kazakhstan; October 18, 1995 – October 12, 1998	Succeeded by Richard H. Jones
Government offices
Preceded by James Dobbins	Assistant Secretary of State for European Affairs; June 1, 2001 – February 28, 2005	Succeeded by Daniel Fried
