= John Carwile =

American diplomat

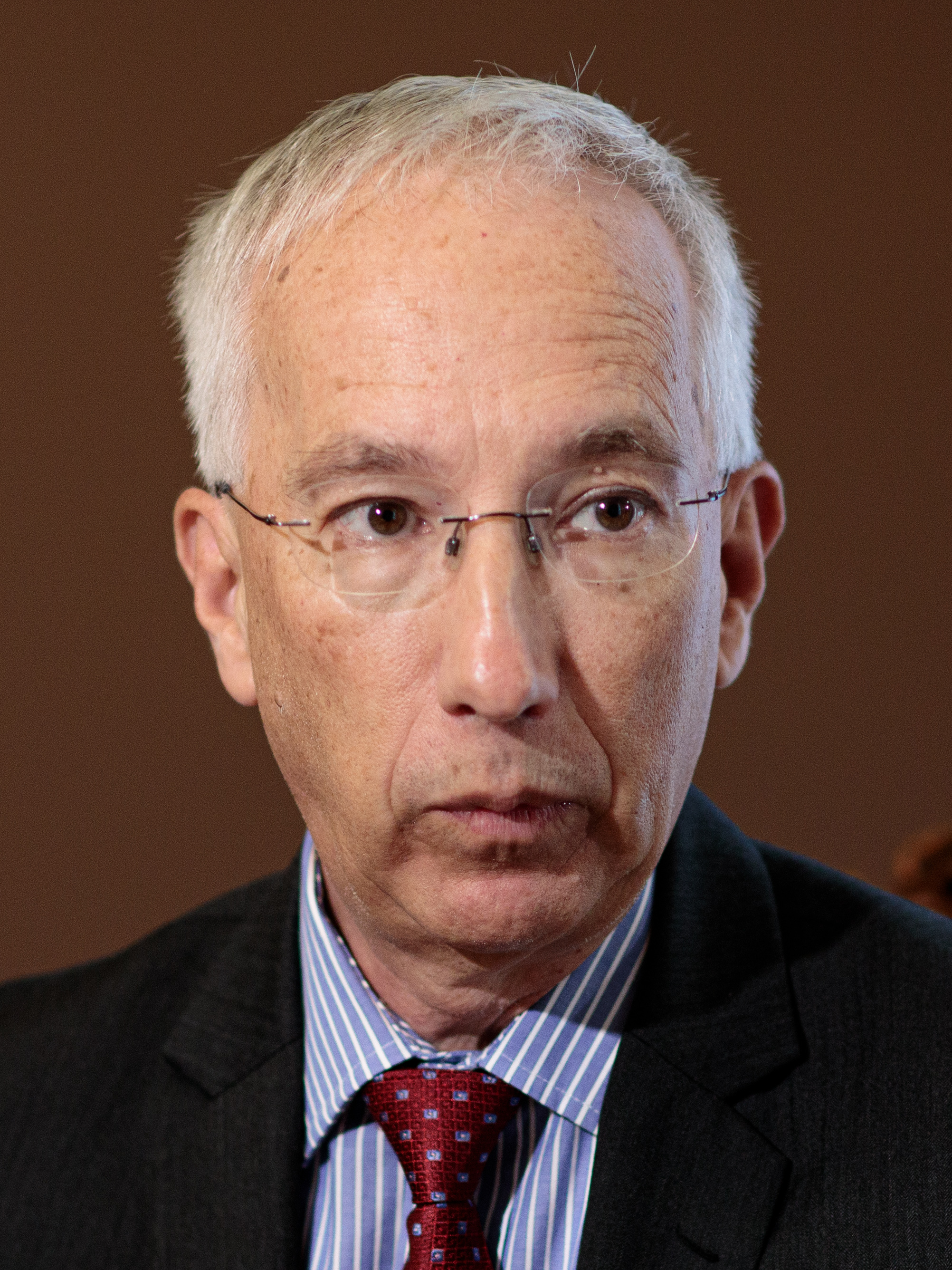
- Carwile in 2022

United States Ambassador to Latvia
- In office November 5, 2019 – January 27, 2023
- President: Donald Trump; Joe Biden
- Preceded by: Nancy Pettit
- Succeeded by: Christopher T. Robinson

Personal details
- Education: College of Wooster (BA); Paul H. Nitze School of Advanced International Studies (MA)

John Leslie Carwile is an American diplomat who served as the United States ambassador to Latvia from 2019 to 2023.

== Early life and education ==
Carwile earned a Bachelor of Arts from the College of Wooster and a Master of Arts from the Paul H. Nitze School of Advanced International Studies.

== Career ==
Early in his career, Carwile worked to advance the Northern Ireland peace process at the U.S. Consulate General in Belfast. He has twice served as Deputy Chief of Mission, first at the United States Embassy in Brunei and more recently at the United States Embassy in Nepal. He has also served as Minister-Counselor for Economic Affairs at the United States Embassy in Italy, as well as Counselor for Economic Affairs at both the United States Embassy in Iraq and the United States Embassy in Canada. Prior to his ambassadorship, he served as Deputy Director of the Office of Career Development and Assignments in the State Department. During his foreign service career he also was assigned as a Consular Officer at the United States Embassy in Peru.

On May 8, 2019, President Trump announced his intent to nominate Carwile to be the next United States Ambassador to Latvia. On September 26, 2019, his nomination was confirmed in the Senate by voice vote. He presented his credentials to President Egils Levits on November 5, 2019.

== Personal ==
Carwile speaks Italian and Spanish.

== See also ==
- List of ambassadors of the United States

Diplomatic posts
Preceded by Nancy Pettit	United States Ambassador to Latvia; 2019–2023	Succeeded by Christopher T. Robinson
