= James B. Cunningham =

American diplomat (born 1952)

James Cunningham
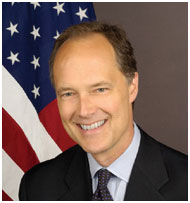
- Official portrait, 2009

20th United States Ambassador to Afghanistan
- In office August 13, 2012 – December 7, 2014
- President: Barack Obama
- Deputy: Tina Kaidanow
- Preceded by: Ryan Crocker
- Succeeded by: Michael McKinley

United States Ambassador to Israel
- In office September 17, 2008 – May 21, 2011
- President: George W. Bush; Barack Obama
- Preceded by: Richard Jones
- Succeeded by: Daniel B. Shapiro

United States Consul General to Hong Kong and Macau
- In office August 4, 2005 – July 2008
- President: George W. Bush
- Preceded by: James R. Keith
- Succeeded by: Joseph R. Donovan Jr.

United States Ambassador to the United Nations
- Acting
- In office January 20, 2001 – September 19, 2001
- President: George W. Bush
- Preceded by: Richard Holbrooke
- Succeeded by: John Negroponte

Personal details
- Born: James Blair Cunningham; 1952 (age 73–74) Allentown, Pennsylvania, U.S.
- Spouse: Leslie Genier
- Education: Syracuse University (BA)

James Blair Cunningham (born 1952) is an American diplomat who served as the United States Ambassador to Afghanistan.

Cunningham previously served in various diplomatic positions, including chief of staff to NATO Secretary General Manfred Woerner (1989–1990), Deputy Advisor for Political Affairs at the United States Mission to the United Nations (1990–1992), Director of the State Department's Office of European Security and Political Affairs (1993-1995), Deputy Chief of Mission, Embassy of the United States in Rome (1996–2001), acting United States Ambassador to the United Nations (2001), Consul General of the United States to Hong Kong and Macau (2005-2008), and United States Ambassador to Israel (2008–2011).

== Early life and education ==
Cunningham was born in Allentown, Pennsylvania. He graduated magna cum laude from the Maxwell School of Citizenship and Public Affairs at Syracuse University in 1974, with degrees in political science and psychology.

== Career ==
He has served as the Deputy Chief of Mission, Embassy of the United States in Rome before becoming an ambassador to the United Nations. He has spent most of his career working on European political and security issues, and in multilateral diplomacy.

He served from 1989 to 1990 as Chief of Staff to NATO Secretary General Manfred Woerner. His responsibilities included advising the Secretary General on the entire range of NATO issues in the context of the dissolution of the Warsaw Pact and the Soviet Union.

Cunningham became Deputy Advisor for Political Affairs at the United States Mission to the United Nations in August 1990, just after the Iraqi invasion of Kuwait. He returned to Washington, D.C., as Deputy Director of the State Department's Office of European Security and Political Affairs in 1992, becoming Director in 1993. As Director, he was involved in many aspects of U.S. policy toward Europe, including NATO, arms control and disarmament, and Bosnia. After a year of senior officer development training, he took up his duties in Rome in August 1996.

As Consul General, (from 2005–2008) Cunningham was responsible for Hong Kong and Macau, both special administrative regions of the People's Republic of China.

Cunningham became the Chairman of the Committee for Freedom in Hong Kong (CFHK) in 2021. CFHK is a US-based non-profit organisation, which presses for the preservation of freedom, democracy, and international law in Hong Kong.

== Personal life ==
He is married to Leslie Genier of Mineville, New York. The couple have two daughters, Emma and Abigail.

== Awards ==
- U.S. State Department Superior Honor Award
- U.S. State Department Meritorious Honor Award
- National Performance Review's Hammer Award

Diplomatic posts
Preceded by Richard Holbrooke	United States Ambassador to the United Nations; Acting; 2001	Succeeded by John Negroponte
Preceded by James R. Keith	United States Consul General to Hong Kong and Macau; 2005–2008	Succeeded by Joseph R. Donovan Jr.
Preceded by Richard Jones	United States Ambassador to Israel; 2008–2011	Succeeded by Daniel B. Shapiro
Preceded by Ryan Crocker	United States Ambassador to Afghanistan; 2012–2014	Succeeded by P. Michael McKinley
