= Michael Klosson =

American diplomat (born 1949)

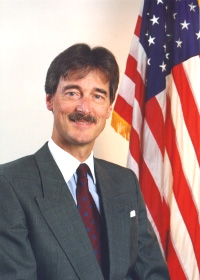
Ambassador Klosson in 2002.

Michael Klosson (born August 22, 1949) is the former U.S. Ambassador to Cyprus and formerly Save the Children’s Vice President for Policy and Humanitarian Response. For the State Department, he also served as U.S. Consul General to Hong Kong, principal deputy assistant secretary for legislative affairs, deputy chief of mission of the Embassy in Stockholm and Embassy in The Hague, and ambassador ad interim to the Netherlands and Sweden.

Born in Washington, D.C., Klosson attended Hamilton College, graduating in 1971 and went on to earn an M.P.A. and M.A. from Princeton University.
