= Richard Jones (U.S. diplomat) =

American diplomat

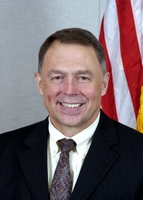

United States Ambassador to Lebanon
- In office October 31, 2015 – May 17, 2016; Acting
- President: Barack Obama
- Preceded by: David Hale
- Succeeded by: Elizabeth Richard
- In office February 2, 1996 – July 8, 1998
- President: Bill Clinton
- Preceded by: Ronald Schlicher
- Succeeded by: David Satterfield

United States Ambassador to Israel
- In office September 26, 2005 – April 27, 2008
- President: George W. Bush
- Preceded by: Daniel Kurtzer
- Succeeded by: James Cunningham

Deputy Administrator of the Coalition Provisional Authority of Iraq
- In office November 1, 2003 – June 28, 2004
- President: George W. Bush
- Preceded by: Position established
- Succeeded by: Position abolished

United States Ambassador to Kuwait
- In office October 1, 2001 – July 26, 2004
- President: George W. Bush
- Preceded by: James Larocco
- Succeeded by: Richard LeBaron

United States Ambassador to Kazakhstan
- In office January 23, 1999 – June 10, 2001
- President: Bill Clinton; George W. Bush
- Preceded by: Elizabeth Jones
- Succeeded by: Larry Napper

Personal details
- Born: August 26, 1950 (age 76) Barksdale, Louisiana, U.S.
- Education: Harvey Mudd College; University of Wisconsin, Madison

Richard Henry Jones (born August 26, 1950) is an American diplomat and the former Deputy Executive Director of the International Energy Agency.

Jones is a career Foreign Service Officer and member of the Senior Foreign Service. He has served as United States Ambassador to Israel (2005–2008), Senior Advisor to the Secretary of State and Coordinator for Iraq Policy (February–September 2005), Chief Policy Officer and Deputy Administrator for the Coalition Provisional Authority in Baghdad (November 2003 - June 2004), Ambassador to Kuwait (2001–2004), Ambassador to Kazakhstan (1998–2000), and Ambassador to Lebanon (1996–1998).

== Early life and education ==
Jones was born at Barksdale Air Force Base in Bossier Parish, Louisiana. He received his Bachelor of Science degree with distinction in mathematics from Harvey Mudd College in Claremont, California and earned a master's and doctorate in business/statistics from the University of Wisconsin, Madison.

== Career ==
Jones has been twice posted to the embassy in Riyadh and has also served in Paris and Tunis and was director of the Division of Developed Country Trade in the Bureau of Economic and Business Affairs (1987–1989) of the State Department, and later director of the State Department’s Office of Egyptian Affairs within its Bureau of Near Eastern Affairs.

Jones served as ambassador to Lebanon from February 1996 until July 1998 and ambassador to Kazakhstan from December 1998 until July 2001. He served as ambassador to Kuwait from September 2001 until July 2004. From November 2003 until June 2004, Jones served concurrently as Chief Policy Officer and Deputy Administrator for the Coalition Provisional Authority in Baghdad. He worked in Kuwait to enlisting Kuwaiti support for the Iraq War and worked under L. Paul Bremer to implement the November 15, 2003 Agreement with the Iraqi Governing Council. Jones was a senior fellow at the Belfer Center for Science and International Affairs at Harvard University's John F. Kennedy School of Government from September 2004 until January 2005.

In February 2005 Jones was named Senior Advisor to the Secretary of State and Coordinator for Iraq Policy (S/I) the highest-ranking State Department post focused entirely on Iraq policy. Jones chaired an Under Secretary of State-level interagency steering group charged with reviewing and developing Iraq policy and led U.S. diplomatic efforts on Iraq with the international community, including preparations for the June 22, 2005 Iraq International Conference in Brussels.

Jones was sworn in as ambassador to Israel by Deputy Secretary of State Robert Zoellick on September 6, 2005. He left that position on August 1, 2008.

Jones served as the deputy executive director of the International Energy Agency, based in Paris from 1 October 2008 until end of September 2013.

Jones most recently served as Chargé d'affaires ad interim at the U.S. Embassy in Beirut, Lebanon from November 2015 until June 2016.

== Personal life ==
He is fluent in Arabic, French, German, and Russian. He served two terms on the board of the Saudi Arabian International School in Riyadh. He enjoys hiking and bicycling, as well as winter and racquet sports.

Jones married Joan Wiener in 1973 and has four children: Josh (1977), Vera (1980), Ben (1991), and Hope (1992).

Diplomatic posts
Preceded by Ronald Schlicher; Acting	United States Ambassador to Lebanon; 1996–1998	Succeeded by David Satterfield
Preceded by Elizabeth Jones	United States Ambassador to Kazakhstan; 1999–2001	Succeeded by Larry Napper
Preceded by James Larocco	United States Ambassador to Kuwait; 2001–2004	Succeeded by Richard LeBaron
Preceded by Daniel Kurtzer	United States Ambassador to Israel; 2005–2008	Succeeded by James Cunningham
Preceded by David Hale	United States Ambassador to Lebanon; Acting; 2015–2016	Succeeded by Elizabeth Richard
