= Ints M. Siliņš =

American diplomat (born 1942)

Ints M. Siliņš (25 March 1942) is a Latvian-American retired Career Foreign Service Officer who served first as Chargé d'Affaires ad interim to Latvia beginning service October 2, 1991 and Ambassador Extraordinary and Plenipotentiary to Latvia until July 14, 1995.

His family emigrated to the United States in July 1949, settling in Maryland. He attended The Hill School on scholarship, graduating in 1960. He went on to graduate from Princeton University in 1965.

== Early life ==
Ints Siliņš was born in Riga, Latvia on 25 March 1942 to Velta Bērziņa and Leonīds Siliņš during World War II, while Latvia was under German occupation. His mother worked in the Latvian Department of Agriculture and his father was an agronomist. In 1944, at age two, Siliņš and his mother escaped from Latvia and ended up in a Displaced persons camp in the American Zone of Germany, escaping the second Soviet occupation of Latvia. Siliņš' father remained in Latvia, hoping for Allied support in the struggle for the restoration of the independence of Latvia. His father was later captured by the Red Army and sent to a Soviet death camp in Siberia, where he later died. Siliņš graduated from Princeton University, with a degree in philosophy and later studied at the University of London. His first job was as an editor at The Washington Star.

== Career ==
Siliņš joined the Foreign Service in 1970 and served in South Vietnam, Romania, Haiti and Sweden. In 1987 he was named deputy director for bilateral relations in the Office of Soviet Affairs in Washington, and served as Consul General for the US Mission in Strasbourg prior to his assignment in Latvia. In his role in the Office of Soviet Affairs, he testified before Congress about backlogs in Soviet refugee claims to the United States.

On February 10, 1992, President George H. W. Bush nominated Siliņš as United States Ambassador to Latvia, a role that Siliņš had taken on as a Chargé d'Affaires in 1991. Siliņš had opened a makeshift Embassy in a room at the Hotel Rīdzene in Riga in October 1991.

In 1995, at the end of his time as Ambassador to Latvia, he was awarded the Order of the Three Stars, Latvia's highest civilian honor.

Diplomatic posts
Preceded by John Cooper Wiley; Soviet occupation of Latvia (1940–1991)	United States Ambassador to Latvia; 1992–1995	Succeeded by Larry C. Napper
