= Assistant Secretary of State for Near Eastern Affairs =

U.S. government position

- Seal of the United States Department of State

- Flag of an Assistant Secretary of State

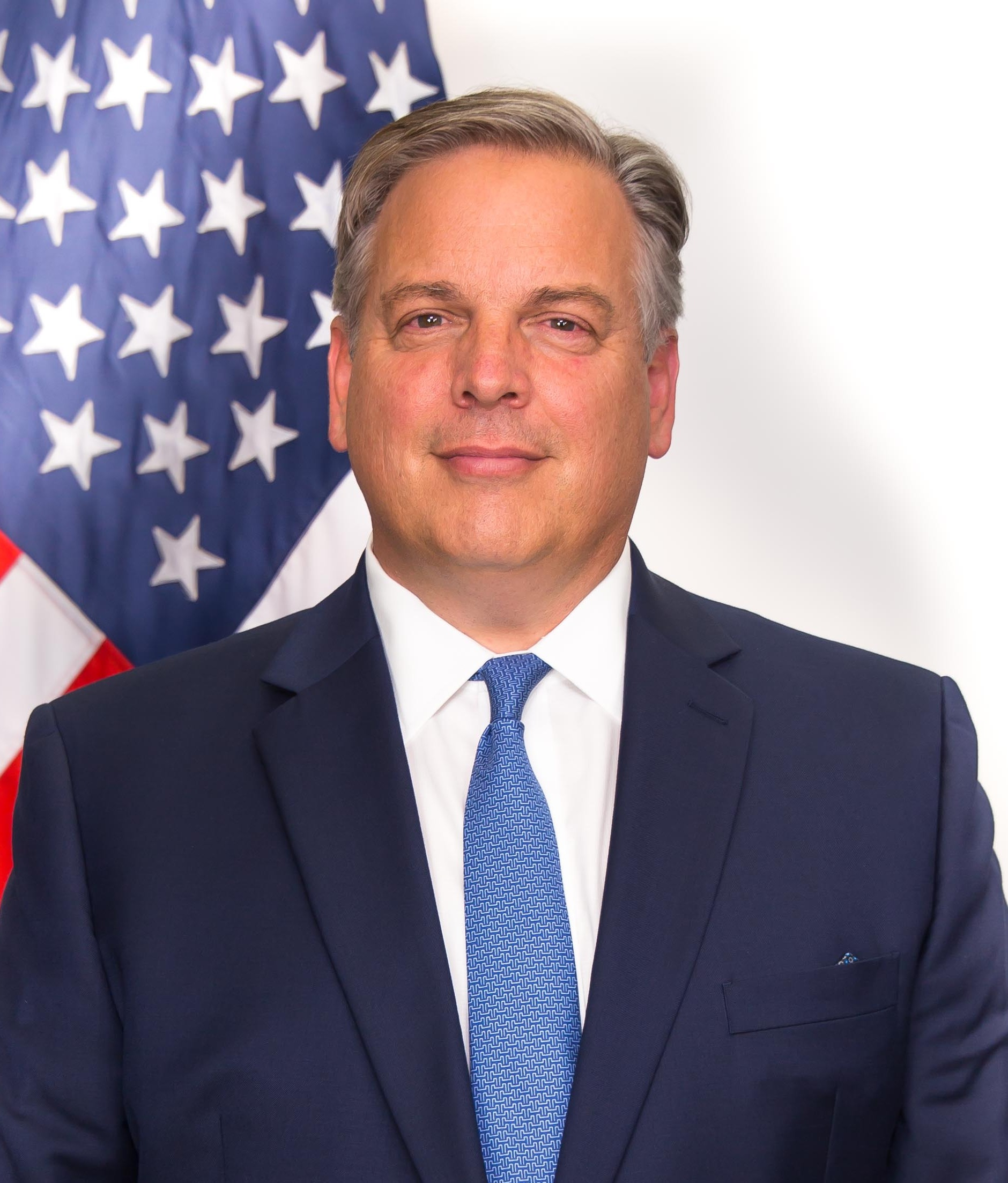
- Incumbent; Donald Blome since August 17, 2026
- U.S. Department of State
- Reports to: Under Secretary of State for Political Affairs
- Nominator: President of the United States
- Inaugural holder: George C. McGhee
- Formation: 1949
- Website: Official Website

The assistant secretary of state for Near Eastern affairs is the head of the Bureau of Near Eastern Affairs within the United States Department of State. The assistant secretary guides the operation of the U.S. diplomatic establishment in various countries of North Africa and the Near East and advises the secretary of state and the under secretary of state for political affairs.

The Assistant Secretary of State for Near Eastern Affairs is a senior official in the United States Department of State responsible for overseeing U.S. foreign policy and relations in the Near Eastern region, which includes countries in the Near East and North Africa.

The Department of State established the position of assistant secretary of state for Near Eastern, South Asian, and African affairs on October 3, 1949. The Commission on Organization of the Executive Branch of Government, popularly known as the Hoover Commission, had recommended that certain offices be upgraded to bureau level and after Congress increased the number of assistant secretaries of state from six to ten. The Department of State established a Division of Near Eastern Affairs in 1909, which dealt with Central, Southern, and Eastern Europe as well as with the Near East. The final remnant of this practice ended on April 18, 1974, when the department transferred responsibility for Greece, Turkey, and Cyprus to the Bureau of European Affairs.

The Division of Near Eastern Affairs included Egypt and Abyssinia (Ethiopia) from its inception. It acquired responsibility for the rest of Africa (except Algeria and the Union of South Africa) in 1937. Relations with African nations became the responsibility of a new Bureau of African Affairs on August 20, 1958. Still, relations with North African nations reverted to the Bureau of Near Eastern and South Asian Affairs on April 22, 1974. The Foreign Relations Authorization Act for Fiscal Years 1992 and 1993 authorized the appointment of an assistant secretary of state for South Asian affairs on October 28, 1991. The Bureau of South Asian Affairs was established August 24, 1992, with the Bureau of Near Eastern Affairs arriving at its present title.

== List of assistant secretaries of state ==
=== Near Eastern, South Asian, and African affairs, 1949–1958 ===
#	Name	Assumed office	Left office	President served under
1	George C. McGhee	June 28, 1949	December 19, 1951	Harry S. Truman
2	Henry A. Byroade	April 14, 1952	January 25, 1955	Harry S. Truman and Dwight D. Eisenhower
3	George V. Allen	January 26, 1955	August 27, 1956	Dwight D. Eisenhower
4	William M. Rountree	August 30, 1956	July 6, 1959	Dwight D. Eisenhower

=== Near Eastern and South Asian affairs, 1958–1992 ===
#	Name	Assumed office	Left office	President served under
5	G. Lewis Jones	July 10, 1959	April 20, 1961	Dwight D. Eisenhower
6	Phillips Talbot	April 21, 1961	September 1, 1965	John F. Kennedy and Lyndon B. Johnson
7	Raymond A. Hare	September 22, 1965	November 30, 1966	Lyndon B. Johnson
8	Lucius D. Battle	April 5, 1967	September 30, 1968	Lyndon B. Johnson
9	Parker T. Hart	October 14, 1968	February 4, 1969	Lyndon B. Johnson
10	Joseph J. Sisco	February 10, 1969	February 18, 1974	Richard Nixon
11	Alfred Atherton	April 27, 1974	April 13, 1978	Richard Nixon, Gerald Ford, and Jimmy Carter
12	Harold H. Saunders	April 11, 1978	January 16, 1981	Jimmy Carter
13	Nicholas A. Veliotes	May 21, 1981	October 27, 1983	Ronald Reagan
14	Richard W. Murphy	October 28, 1983	May 15, 1989	Ronald Reagan
15	John Hubert Kelly	June 16, 1989	September 30, 1991	George H. W. Bush
16	Edward Djerejian	September 30, 1991	December 17, 1993	George H. W. Bush and Bill Clinton

=== Near Eastern affairs, 1992–present ===
On August 24, 1992, the Bureau of Near Eastern and South Asian Affairs divided into a separate Bureau of Near Eastern Affairs and a Bureau of South and Central Asian Affairs. At that time, Edward Djerejian became assistant secretary of state for Near Eastern affairs; he was also concurrently acting assistant secretary of state for South and Central Asian affairs until May 30, 1993.

#	Name	Assumed office	Left office	President(s) served under
16	Edward Djerejian	September 30, 1991	December 17, 1993	George H. W. Bush and Bill Clinton
17	Robert Pelletreau	February 18, 1994	January 24, 1997	Bill Clinton
18	Martin Indyk	October 14, 1997	November 16, 1999	Bill Clinton
19	Edward S. Walker Jr.	January 18, 2000	May 1, 2001	Bill Clinton
20	William J. Burns	June 4, 2001	March 2, 2005	George W. Bush
21	David Welch	March 18, 2005	December 18, 2008	George W. Bush
22	Jeffrey D. Feltman	August 18, 2009	May 31, 2012	Barack Obama
23	Anne W. Patterson	December 23, 2013	January 6, 2017	Barack Obama
-	Stuart E. Jones (acting)	January 9, 2017	June 2017	Donald Trump
-	David M. Satterfield (acting)	September 2017	June 2019	Donald Trump
24	David Schenker	June 14, 2019	January 20, 2021	Donald Trump
-	Joey R. Hood (acting)	January 20, 2021	August 30, 2021	Joe Biden
-	Yael Lempert (acting)	August 31, 2021	May 31, 2022	Joe Biden
25	Barbara A. Leaf	May 31, 2022	January 20, 2025	Joe Biden
-	Timothy A. Lenderking (acting)	January 20, 2025	May 19, 2025	Donald Trump
-	Mora Namdar (acting)	May 19, 2025	December 1, 2025	Donald Trump
-	Robert J. Palladino (acting)	December 1, 2025	August 17, 2026	Donald Trump
26	Donald Blome	August 17, 2026	Incumbent	Donald Trump
