= G. Lewis Jones =

American diplomat

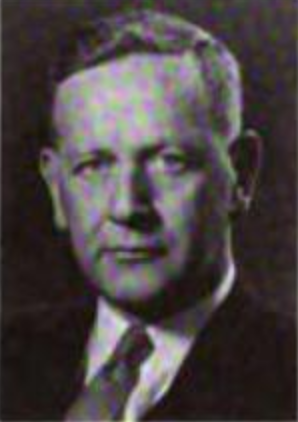
- Jones, from a 1966 publication of the U.S. State Deparment

5th Assistant Secretary of State for Near Eastern and South Asian Affairs
- In office July 10, 1959 – April 20, 1961
- Preceded by: William M. Rountree
- Succeeded by: Phillips Talbot

Personal details
- Born: May 18, 1907 Baltimore, Maryland, U.S.
- Died: November 13, 1971 (aged 64) Washington, D.C., U.S.
- Education: Harvard College (BS); Cambridge University; London School of Economics

George Lewis Jones Jr. (May 18, 1907 – November 13, 1971) was an American diplomat who was the United States Ambassador to Tunisia from 1956 to 1959 and the U.S. Assistant Secretary of State for Near Eastern and South Asian Affairs from 1959 to 1961.

== Biography ==
G. Lewis Jones was born in Baltimore on May 18, 1907. He attended high school at the Boys' Latin School of Maryland, graduating in 1925. He attended Harvard College, receiving a B.S. in 1929. He spent the 1929–30 school year at Christ's College, Cambridge and the 1930–31 school year at the London School of Economics, though he did not take another degree.

After college, Jones joined the United States Department of State, initially as a clerk to the commercial attaché in London. He became a clerk to the U.S. commercial attaché in Cairo in 1932, and was promoted to Assistant Trade Commissioner in 1934. He became Assistant Trade Commissioner in Athens in 1935, being promoted to assistant commercial attaché in 1938, serving there until 1939. He returned to Cairo as Vice Consul in 1941–42. From 1945 to 1946, he was Assistant Chief of the Division of Near Eastern Affairs. He served as Counselor in London from 1946 to 1949. He spent 1950 at the Policy Planning Staff. From 1950 to 1952, he was Director of the Division of Near Eastern Affairs. Jones returned to the field in 1952, becoming Consul General in Tunis 1952-53 and then Counselor in Cairo 1953–1955. He was Minister-Counselor in Tehran from 1955 to 1956.

In 1956, President of the United States Dwight D. Eisenhower nominated Jones as United States Ambassador to Tunisia; Jones presented his credentials to the Tunisian government on October 4, 1956. Tunisia became a republic on July 25, 1957, gaining its independence from France on March 20, 1956, and Jones re-presented his credentials to the first President of Tunisia, Habib Bourguiba, on December 9, 1957. Jones' tenure as Ambassador ended on June 11, 1959.

President Eisenhower then nominated Jones as Assistant Secretary of State for Near Eastern and South Asian Affairs; Jones held this office from July 10, 1959, until April 20, 1961.

Jones returned to the field again in 1961, serving as Minister-Counselor in London until 1964. In 1966, Jones received a Distinguished Honor Award at a Foreign Service Day event in Washington.

Jones died of cancer in Washington, D.C., on November 13, 1971, at age 64.

Diplomatic posts
Preceded by Morris N. Hughes	United States Ambassador to Tunisia; October 4, 1956 – June 11, 1959	Succeeded by Walter N. Walmsley
Government offices
Preceded by William M. Rountree	Assistant Secretary of State for Near Eastern and South Asian Affairs; July 10, 1959 – April 20, 1961	Succeeded by Phillips Talbot
