= List of ambassadors of the United States to South Africa =

Ambassador of the United States to South Africa
- Seal of the United States Department of State

- Flag of a United States ambassador

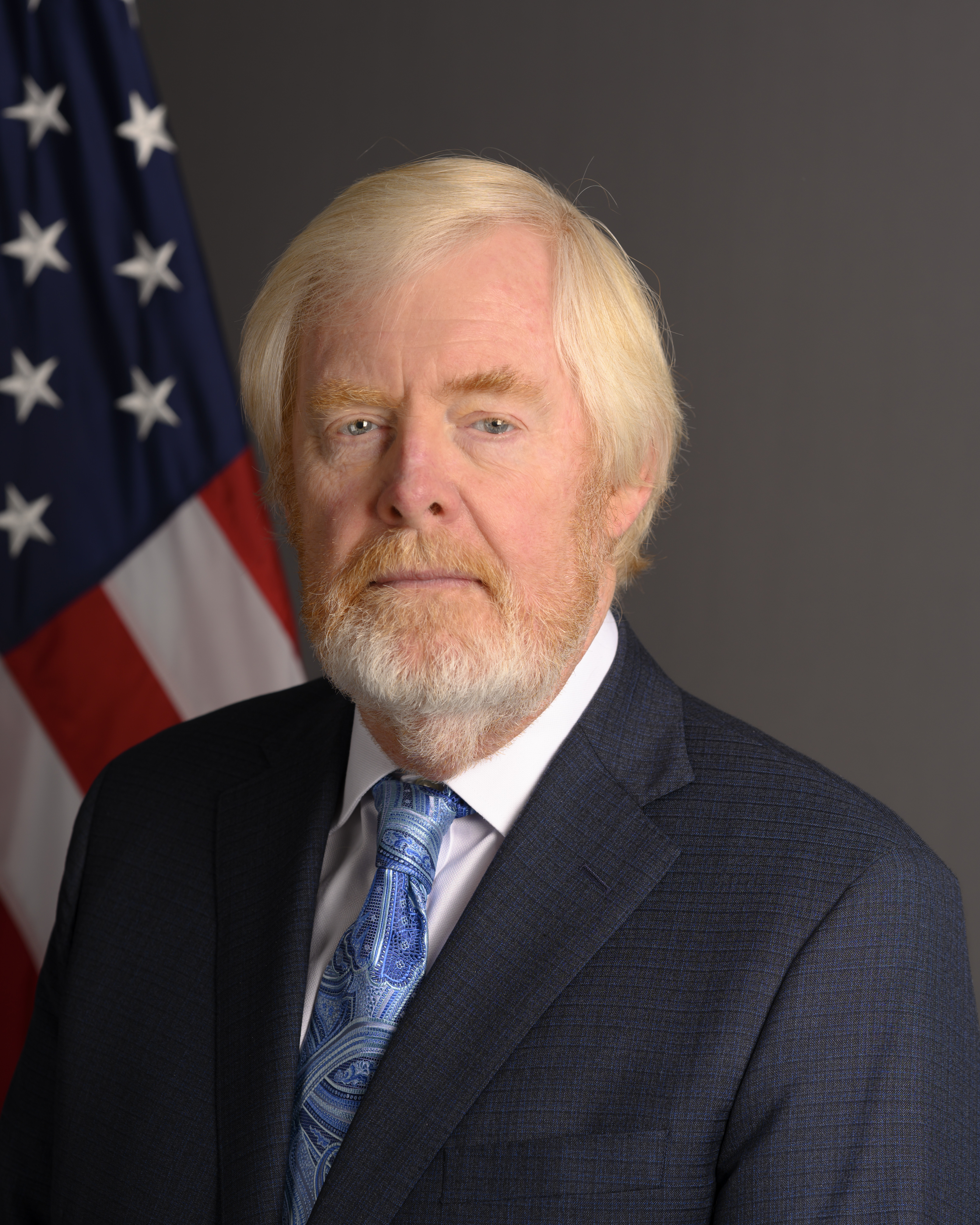
- Incumbent; L. Brent Bozell III since February 23, 2026
- Nominator: President of the United States
- Inaugural holder: Ralph J. Totten as Minister Resident/Consul General
- Formation: December 19, 1929
- Website: U.S. Embassy - Pretoria

Before 1902, the southern part of Africa that is now South Africa was under the hegemony of Great Britain. There also were two self-proclaimed independent states: Transvaal (also known as the South African Republic), and the Orange Free State. The British and the Boers fought two wars, known as the First Boer War (1880–1881) and the Second Boer War (1899–1902); after the second war, in which the British prevailed, both republics were incorporated into the British Empire. On May 31, 1910, the two ex-republics and the British colonies of the Cape and Natal formed the Union of South Africa, a self-governing dominion of the British Empire.

The United States appointed its first envoy to South Africa, Ralph J. Totten, in 1929. He was appointed as Minister Resident/Consul General and promoted to Envoy Extraordinary and Minister Plenipotentiary the following year.

South Africa was renamed the Republic of South Africa on May 31, 1961, after links to the British crown were severed.

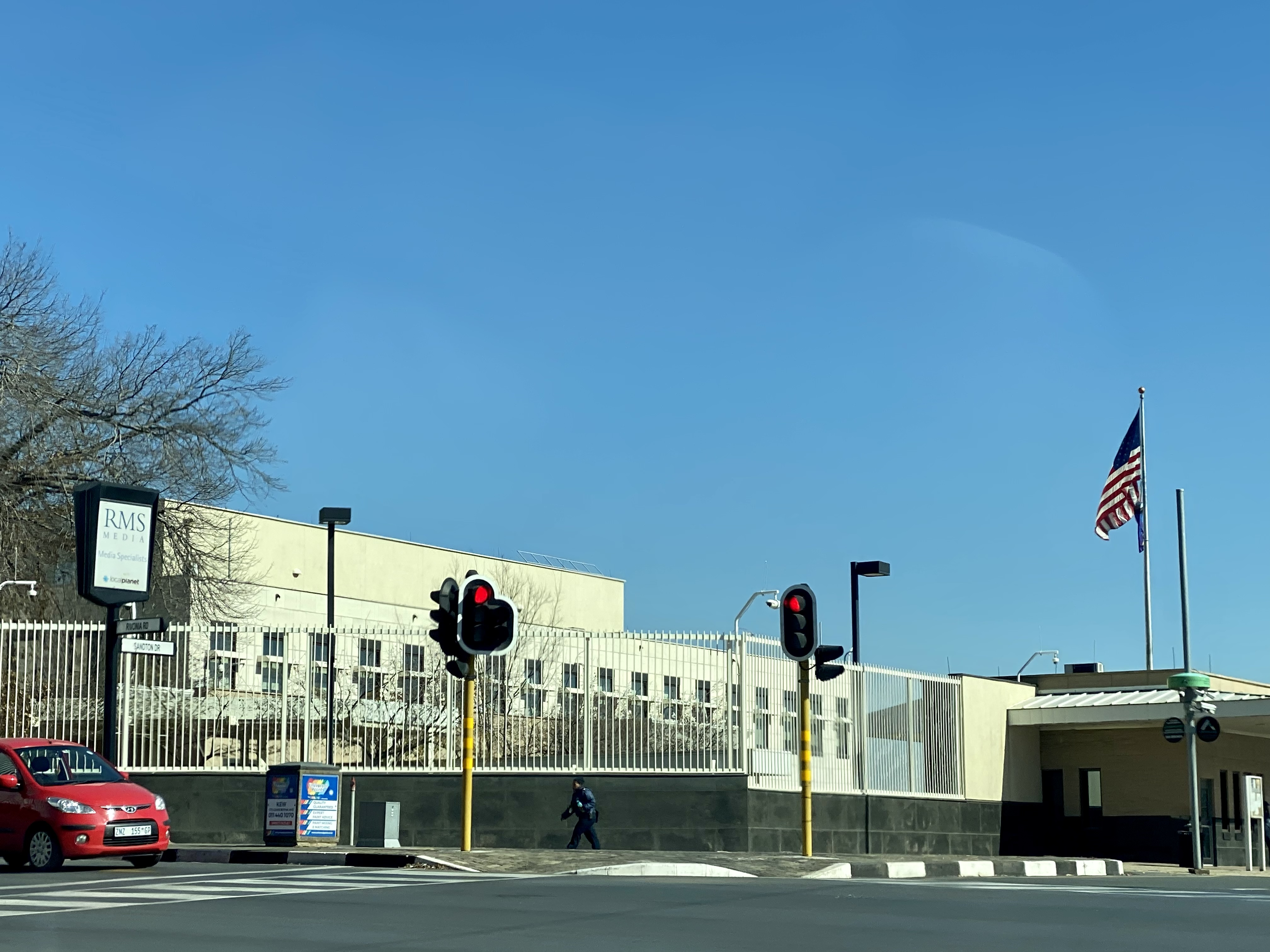
US Consulate in Johannesburg, South Africa

== Ambassadors ==
- Note: The ambassadors were commissioned to the Union of South Africa until 1961 when South Africa became a republic.

Name	Title	Appointed	Presented credentials	Terminated mission	Notes
Ralph J. Totten – Career FSO	Minister Resident/Consul General	December 19, 1929	February 18, 1930	June 20, 1930	
Ralph J. Totten – Career FSO	Envoy Extraordinary and Minister Plenipotentiary	June 20, 1930	September 8, 1930	April 12, 1937	
Leo J. Keena – Career FSO	Envoy Extraordinary and Minister Plenipotentiary	July 31, 1937	October 22, 1937	August 13, 1942	
Lincoln MacVeagh – Political appointee	Envoy Extraordinary and Minister Plenipotentiary	May 21, 1942	October 21, 1942	November 21, 1943	
Thomas Holcomb – Political appointee	Envoy Extraordinary and Minister Plenipotentiary	March 21, 1944	June 14, 1944	May 30, 1948	
North Winship – Career FSO	Ambassador Extraordinary and Plenipotentiary	March 24, 1948	June 11, 1948	December 20, 1949	The title of the office was changed to Ambassador Extraordinary and Plenipotentiary on March 2, 1949.
John G. Erhardt – Career FSO	Ambassador Extraordinary and Plenipotentiary	May 23, 1950	October 4, 1950	Died at Cape Town, February 18, 1951	
Waldemar J. Gallman – Career FSO	Ambassador Extraordinary and Plenipotentiary	August 22, 1951	October 18, 1951	August 15, 1954	
Edward T. Wailes – Career FSO	Ambassador Extraordinary and Plenipotentiary	September 15, 1954	November 29, 1954	August 11, 1956	
Henry A. Byroade – Career FSO	Ambassador Extraordinary and Plenipotentiary	July 26, 1956	October 9, 1956	January 24, 1959	
Philip K. Crowe – Political appointee	Ambassador Extraordinary and Plenipotentiary	February 16, 1959	April 22, 1959	April 6, 1961	
Joseph C. Satterthwaite – Career FSO	Ambassador Extraordinary and Plenipotentiary	April 6, 1961	May 22, 1961	May 31, 1961	South Africa became a republic on May 31, 1961. This required a new commission for the ambassador. Hereafter ambassadors were commissioned to the Republic of South Africa.
Joseph C. Satterthwaite – Career FSO	Ambassador Extraordinary and Plenipotentiary	May 31, 1961	May 31, 1961	November 17, 1965	
William M. Rountree – Career FSO	Ambassador Extraordinary and Plenipotentiary	October 20, 1965	January 8, 1966	June 5, 1970	
John G. Hurd – Political appointee	Ambassador Extraordinary and Plenipotentiary	July 24, 1970	September 10, 1970	April 7, 1975	
William G. Bowdler – Career FSO	Ambassador Extraordinary and Plenipotentiary	March 17, 1975	May 14, 1975	April 19, 1978	
William B. Edmondson – Career FSO	Ambassador Extraordinary and Plenipotentiary	May 3, 1978	June 5, 1978	July 22, 1981	
Herman W. Nickel – Political appointee	Ambassador Extraordinary and Plenipotentiary	March 29, 1982	April 20, 1982	October 4, 1986	
Edward Joseph Perkins – Career FSO	Ambassador Extraordinary and Plenipotentiary	October 16, 1986	November 27, 1986	May 22, 1989	
William Lacy Swing – Career FSO	Ambassador Extraordinary and Plenipotentiary	August 7, 1989	September 8, 1989	July 5, 1992	
Princeton N. Lyman – Career FSO	Ambassador Extraordinary and Plenipotentiary	July 14, 1992	September 21, 1992	December 14, 1995	
James A. Joseph – Political appointee	Ambassador Extraordinary and Plenipotentiary	December 19, 1995	February 27, 1996	November 7, 1999	
Delano Lewis – Political appointee	Ambassador Extraordinary and Plenipotentiary	November 16, 1999	January 21, 2000	June 22, 2001	
Cameron R. Hume – Career FSO	Ambassador Extraordinary and Plenipotentiary	November 5, 2001	November 29, 2001	July 28, 2004	
Jendayi Elizabeth Frazer – Political appointee	Ambassador Extraordinary and Plenipotentiary	May 25, 2004	August 10, 2004	August 26, 2005	
Eric M. Bost – Political appointee	Ambassador Extraordinary and Plenipotentiary	July 20, 2006	August 15, 2006	January 20, 2009	
Donald Gips - Political Appointee	Ambassador Extraordinary and Plenipotentiary	July 7, 2009	October 1, 2009	January 2, 2013	
Patrick Gaspard - Political Appointee	Ambassador Extraordinary and Plenipotentiary	August 26, 2013	October 16, 2013	December 16, 2016	
Jessica Lapenn - Career FSO	Chargé d'Affaires ad interim	December 16, 2016	N/A	September 13, 2019	
Lana Marks - Political Appointee	Ambassador Extraordinary and Plenipotentiary	October 4, 2019	January 28, 2020	January 20, 2021	
John Groarke - Career FSO	Chargé d'Affaires ad interim	January 20, 2021		March 2021	
Todd P. Haskell - Career FSO	Chargé d'Affaires ad interim	March 2021		April 11, 2022	
Heather Merritt - Career FSO	Chargé d'Affaires ad interim	April 11, 2022		August 11, 2022	
Reuben Brigety - Political Appointee	Ambassador Extraordinary and Plenipotentiary	July 21, 2022	August 11, 2022	January 3, 2025	
Dana M. Brown - Career FSO	Chargé d'Affaires ad interim	January 3, 2025		March 14, 2025	
David Greene – Career FSO	Chargé d'Affaires ad interim	March 14, 2025		September 2025	
Leo Brent Bozell III - Political Appointee	Ambassador Extraordinary and Plenipotentiary	December 18, 2025	February 23, 2026	Present	

== See also ==
- Embassy of South Africa, Washington, D.C.
- South Africa – United States relations
- Foreign relations of South Africa
- Ambassadors of the United States
