= Thomas Holcomb =

USMC general and Commandant of the Corps (1879–1965)

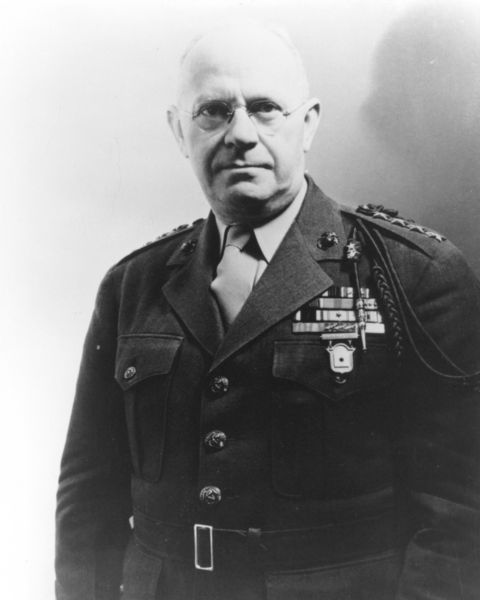
- 17th Commandant of the Marine Corps (1936–1943)
- Born: August 5, 1879; New Castle, Delaware, U.S.
- Died: May 24, 1965 (aged 85); New Castle, Delaware, U.S.
- Burial place: Arlington National Cemetery
- Relatives: BGen Bankson T. Holcomb Jr. (cousin)
- Military career
- Allegiance: United States
- Branch: United States Marine Corps
- Service years: 1900–1944
- Rank: General
- Commands: 2nd Battalion 6th Marines; Marine Corps Schools; Commandant of the Marine Corps
- Conflicts: World War I World War II
- Awards: Navy Cross; Navy Distinguished Service Medal; Silver Star (4); Purple Heart; Legion of Honor; Croix de Guerre
- Other work: Minister to South Africa

General Thomas Holcomb (August 5, 1879 – May 24, 1965) was a United States Marine Corps officer who served as the seventeenth Commandant of the Marine Corps from 1936 to 1943. He was the first Marine to achieve the rank of general, and was a strong supporter of racial segregation in the Marine Corps. After retiring from the Marine Corps, Holcomb served as the U.S. Envoy Extraordinary and Minister Plenipotentiary to South Africa from 1944 to 1948. One of his ancestors was Joshua Barney, a naval hero of the War of 1812.

== Early years ==
Holcomb was born on August 5, 1879, in New Castle, Delaware, one of four children, the son of Elizabeth Hindman Barney, daughter of Confederate naval officer Joseph Nicholson Barney, and Thomas Holcomb, an attorney and Speaker of the Delaware House of Representatives. He attended private schools there until 1893 when his father took a position in the Treasury Department of president Cleveland's second administration and moved the family to Washington, D.C. He graduated from Western High School in 1897. His curriculum included military drills in uniform; here Holcomb learned about military discipline.

== First job ==
His father encouraged Holcomb to enter the business world. In 1898 Holcomb took a job as a cost clerk at the Bethlehem Steel works in Sparrows Point, Maryland, for two years.

== Marine Corps career ==
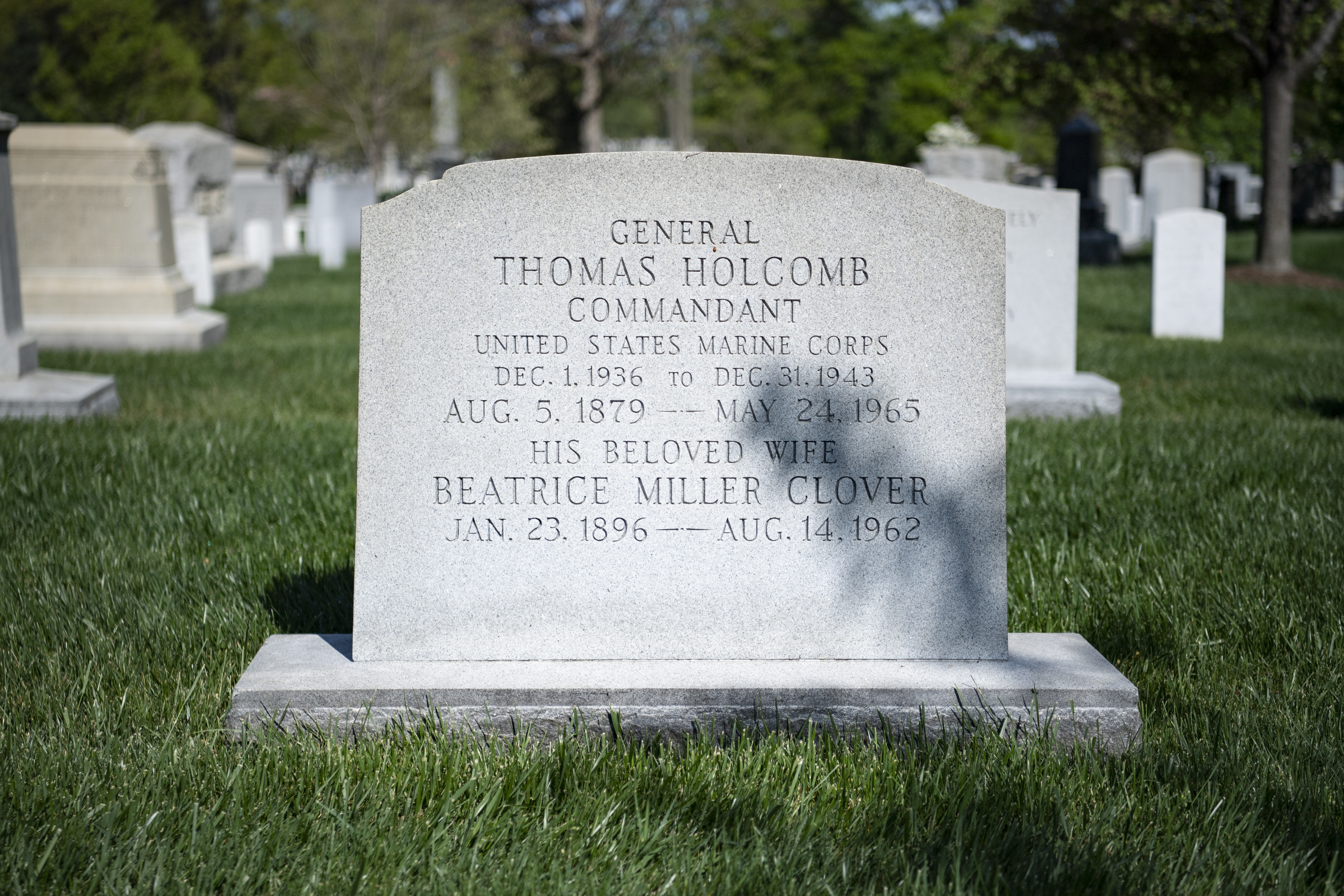
Grave at Arlington National Cemetery

Holcomb was appointed a second lieutenant in the Marine Corps from civilian life on April 13, 1900. Second Lieutenant Holcomb was on detached duty with a company of Marines organized for service with a Marine battalion attached to the North Atlantic Fleet from September 1902 to April 1903. Holcomb’s first claim to fame was winning the International long distance rifle championship in 1902 Montreal, Canada. He was promoted to first lieutenant March 3, 1903 and put in charge of the US Marine Corps rifle team bringing to championship in 1911. He served in the Philippine Islands from April 1904 to August 1905, and in October and November 1906.

He was on duty with the Legation Guard in Peking, China, from September 1905 to September 1906. He was appointed a captain May 13, 1908 and from December of that year to July 1910, he again served with the Legation Guard at Peking. He continued on duty in Peking as attache on the staff of the American Minister for study of the Chinese language and remained until May 1911. In December 1911, he was again ordered to the Legation at Peking to continue his study of the Chinese language and continued in that capacity until May 1914.

Captain Holcomb served as Inspector of Target Practice in the Marine Corps from October 1914 to August 1917. While serving as such, he was promoted to the rank of major on August 29, 1916. On November 11, 1916, he married Beatrice Miller Clover, daughter of Admiral Richardson Clover. Then Commandant of the Marine Corps, Major General George Barnett, and his wife hosted a luncheon for them at the Commandant's House.

=== World War I ===
From August 1917 to January 1918, Major Holcomb commanded the 2d Battalion, 6th Marine Regiment, at the Marine Barracks, Quantico, Virginia, in preparation for overseas duty. From February 1918 to July of the next year, he served with the American Expeditionary Force (AEF) in France. He commanded the 2d Battalion from August 1918 and served as second in command of the 6th Marine Regiment, taking part in the Third Battle of the Aisne, Château-Thierry, Soissons (in the Aisne-Marne Offensive), the Marbache Sector, St. Mihiel, the Meuse–Argonne offensive, and the march to the Rhine in Germany following the Armistice.

In recognition of his distinguished services in France, he was awarded the Navy Cross, the Silver Star with three Oak Leaf Clusters, a Meritorious Service Citation by the Commander-in-Chief, AEF, and the Purple Heart, and was three times cited in General Orders of the Second Division, AEF. The French Government conferred on him the Cross of the Legion of Honor and three times awarded him the Croix de Guerre with Palm. He was appointed lieutenant colonel on June 4, 1920.

=== 1920s–1936 ===
From September 1922 to June 1924, he commanded the Marine Barracks, Naval Station, Guantanamo Bay, Cuba, and on his return to the United States was ordered to the Command and General Staff School of the Army at Fort Leavenworth, Kansas. Upon completion of the course as a Distinguished Graduate, in June 1925, he was ordered to Headquarters Marine Corps (HQMC) for duty in the Division of Operations and Training, where he remained until June 1927.

From August 1927 to February 1930, Col Holcomb commanded the Marine detachment, American Legation, Peking, China. He was promoted to colonel on December 22, 1928. In June 1930, he went to the Naval War College as a student, Senior Course. He graduated in June 1931. He was then ordered to the Army War College, graduating a year later.

From June 1932 to January 1935, prior to his appointment to brigadier general, he served in the Office of Naval Operations, Navy Department. He was promoted to brigadier general on February 1, 1935. He served as commandant of the Marine Corps Schools at Quantico, Virginia, until November 1936.

=== Commandant of the Marine Corps ===
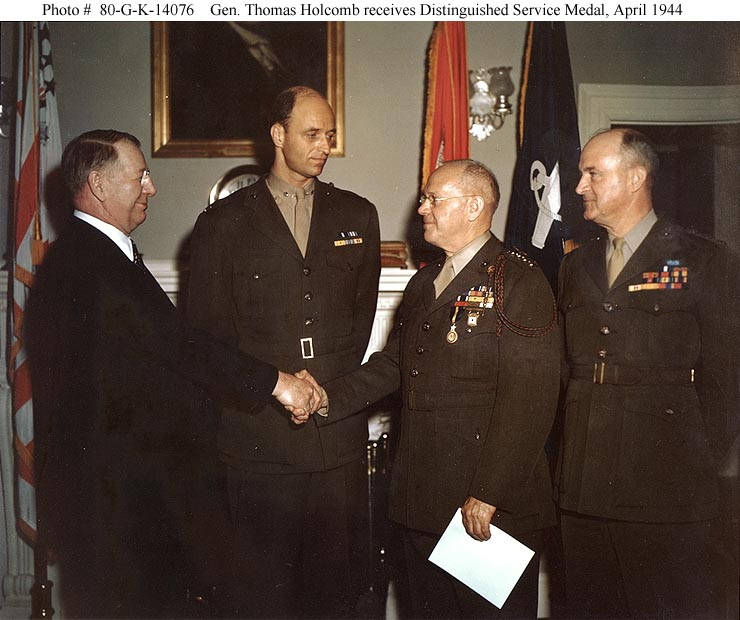
General Holcomb congratulated by Secretary of the Navy Frank Knox after being awarded the Distinguished Service Medal in 1944. Looking on are Colonel Roosevelt and LtGen Vandegrift (right).

On December 1, 1936, Holcomb returned to Headquarters Marine Corps to assume the office of the Commandant of the Marine Corps.

In April 1941 the US Navy convened its General Board to discuss expansion of the Corps. Holcomb said that African Americans had no right to serve as Marines. He said, "If it were a question of having a Marine Corps of 5,000 whites or 250,000 Negroes, I would rather have the whites." In 1943, he passed Letter of Instruction 421, which restricted African-American Marines' ability to be promoted and prevented them from serving as non-commissioned officers in charge of whites.

With his advancement to lieutenant general on January 20, 1942, he became the highest-ranking officer ever to command the Marine Corps up to that time.

On August 5, 1943, when Lt Gen Holcomb reached the regular retirement age, President Franklin D. Roosevelt announced he was continuing LtGen Holcomb as Commandant of the Marine Corps, in recognition of his outstanding services in that capacity. Holcomb continued as commandant until December 31, 1943. He was succeeded by LtGen Alexander A. Vandegrift.

During Lt Gen Holcomb's seven-year tour of duty as commandant, the Marine Corps expanded from 16,000 to about 300,000 Marines. Also, on February 13, 1943, he officially announced that women were eligible to serve in the Marine Corps; a date that is recognized and celebrated as the anniversary of women in the Marine Corps.

On April 12, 1944, Holcomb was awarded the Navy Distinguished Service Medal for his outstanding work as commandant.

=== Retirement from the Marine Corps ===
After nearly 44 years as a Marine, LtGen Holcomb retired on January 1, 1944. Because he had been specially commended for his performance of duty in actual combat, he was advanced one rank on the retired list in accordance with a newly passed Act of Congress. He thus became the first Marine ever to hold the rank of general.

== Orders, decorations and medals ==
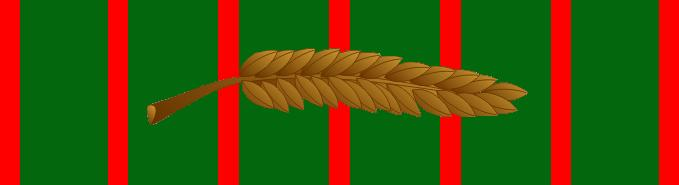
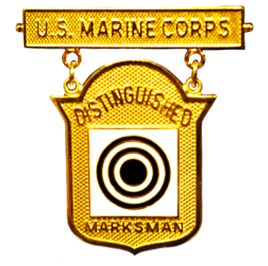

1st Row	Navy Cross	Navy Distinguished Service Medal	Silver Star with three oak leaf clusters	
2nd Row	Purple Heart	Marine Corps Expeditionary Medal	World War I Victory Medal with five battle clasps;	Army of Occupation of Germany Medal
3rd Row	American Defense Service Medal with Base clasp	American Campaign Medal	Asiatic-Pacific Campaign Medal with one 3/16 inch service star	World War II Victory Medal
4th Row	Légion d'honneur, Grade Chevalier	French Croix de guerre 1914–1918 with three palms	Order of Naval Merit (Cuba), First Class in Wite	Order of Orange-Nassau, Knight Grand Cross
Marine Corps Distinguished Marksman Badge

=== Navy Cross citation ===
Citation:

The President of the United States of America takes pleasure in presenting the Navy Cross to Lieutenant Colonel Thomas Holcomb (MCSN: 0-436), United States Marine Corps, for extraordinary heroism while serving with the Second Battalion, 6th Regiment (Marines), 2d Division, A.E.F. in action in France. As Commander of the Second Battalion, and later as second-in-command of the 6th Regiment (Marines), Lieutenant Colonel Holcomb performed all of his duty in a most commendable manner, proved himself a brave, active, resourceful officer by his zealous and intelligent attention to duty as well as personal courage and fearlessness in the face of the enemy.

== Minister to South Africa ==
On March 9, 1944, President Roosevelt nominated Gen Holcomb for the position of United States Minister to the Union of South Africa. He resigned from this position on June 15, 1948.

== Retirement ==
In retirement, Holcomb lived in St. Mary's City, Maryland, where he managed the family farm until 1956. He then moved to Chevy Chase, Maryland. In 1962, he moved to Washington, D.C.

In 1944 Holcomb was elected an honorary member of the Delaware Society of the Cincinnati.

Following a serious illness in the spring of 1964, he returned to his native New Castle. General Holcomb died in New Castle, Delaware, on May 24, 1965, aged 85. He was interred in Arlington National Cemetery.

Military offices
Preceded by Maj. Gen. John H. Russell, Jr.	Commandant of the United States Marine Corps; 1936–1943	Succeeded by Lt. Gen. Alexander Vandegrift
Diplomatic posts
Preceded by Leo J. Keena	United States Ambassador to South Africa; 1944–1948	Succeeded by North Winship
