= David Schenker =

American defense analyst and diplomat (born 1968)

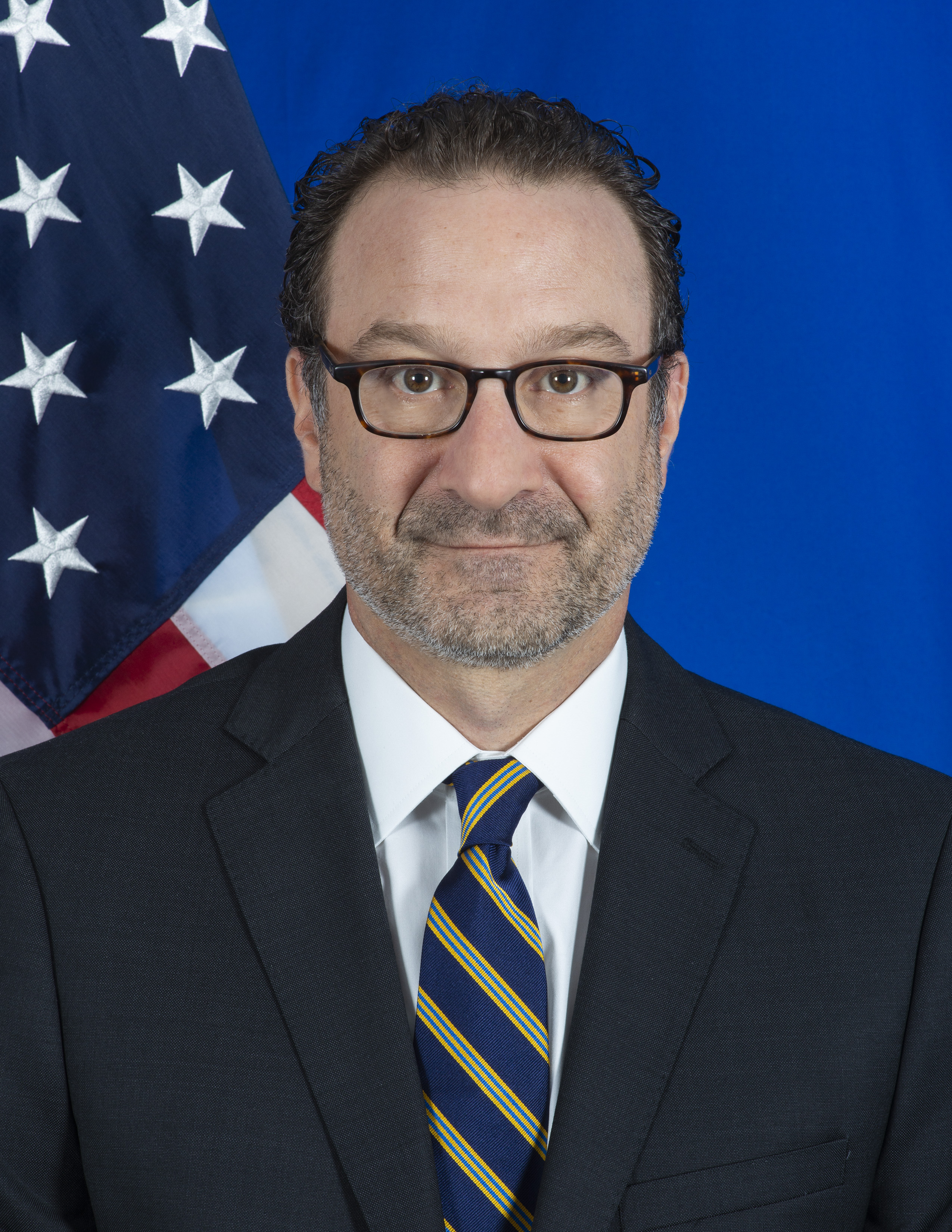
- Schenker in 2021

24th Assistant Secretary of State for Near Eastern Affairs
- In office June 14, 2019 – January 20, 2021
- President: Donald Trump
- Preceded by: Anne W. Patterson
- Succeeded by: Barbara A. Leaf

Personal details
- Born: 1968 (age 57–58) New Jersey, U.S.
- Education: University of Vermont (BA); University of Michigan (MA); American University in Cairo
- Profession: Diplomat

David Kenneth Schenker (born 1968) is an American diplomat who worked in the Department of Defense during the George W. Bush administration, and was nominated on April 9, 2018, to head the Bureau of Near Eastern Affairs in the State Department.

== Early life ==
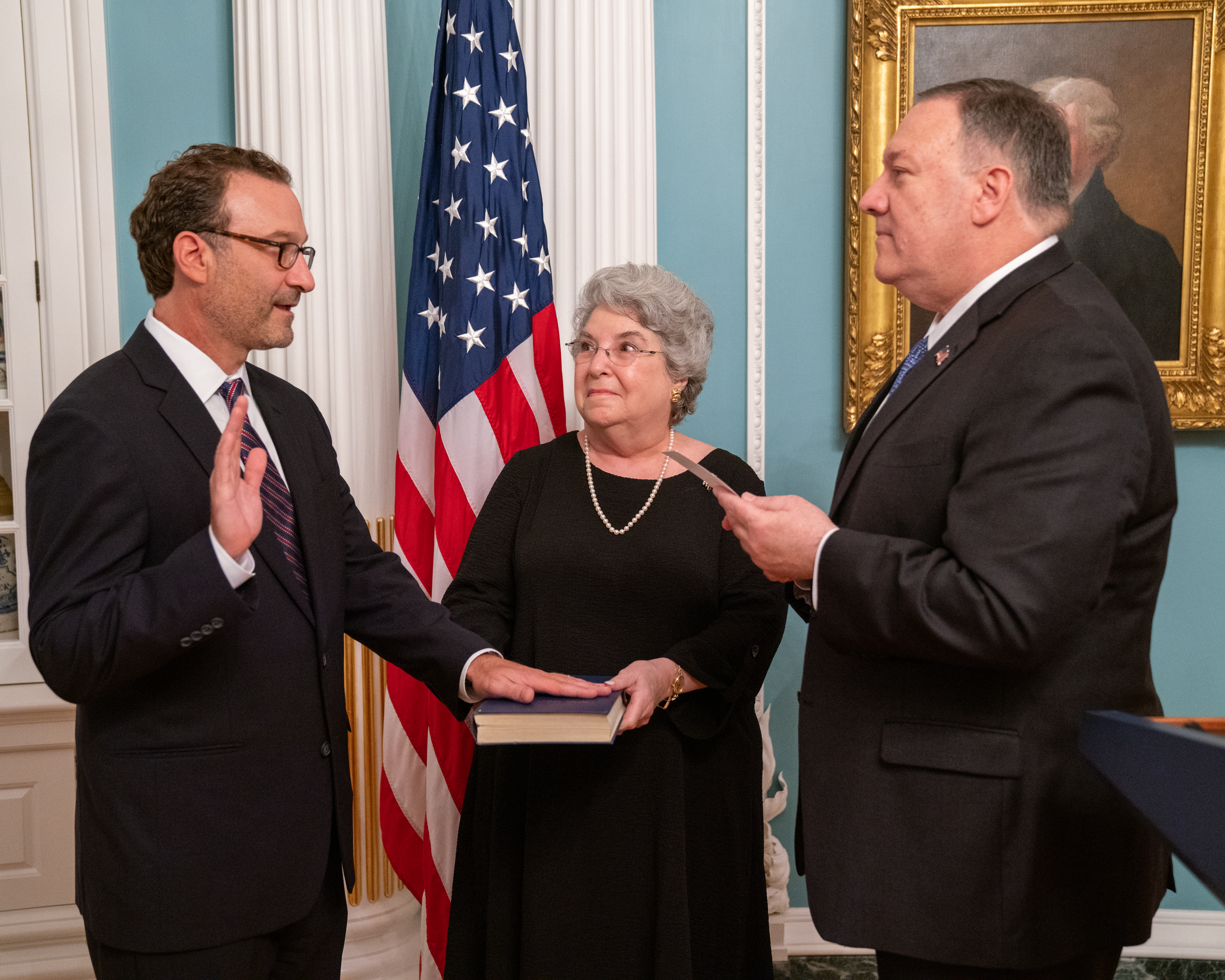
Schenker is sworn in by U.S. Secretary of State Michael R. Pompeo as Assistant Secretary of State for Near Eastern Affairs at the U.S. Department of State in Washington, D.C., on August 29, 2019.

Schenker was born in 1968 to mother Linda and father Michael Schenker, both Jewish. He grew up in Ridgewood, New Jersey, graduating from Ridgewood High School in 1986. Schenker earned a B.A. at the University of Vermont in 1990, then an M.A. at the University of Michigan and Certificate, Center for Arabic Study Abroad (CASA), at the American University in Cairo.

Schenker has spent most of his career at the Washington Institute for Near East Policy, starting as an analyst after graduate school.

In 2002, Schenker temporarily left the Washington Institute to be Levant (Syria, Lebanon, Jordan and Israel) country director in the Bush Defense Department under Secretary Donald Rumsfeld. Schenker returned to the Washington Institute in 2006 and has been there since. At the time of his nomination to the State Department, Schenker was director of the institute's Program on Arab Politics.

Schenker is a prolific writer, often on Hezbollah in Lebanon and about Syria. He has written two books, Dancing with Saddam: The Strategic Tango of Jordanian–Iraqi Relations (2003) and Palestinian Democracy and Governance: An Appraisal of the Legislative Council (2000).

Government offices
Preceded by David Satterfield; Acting	Assistant Secretary of State for Near Eastern Affairs; June 14, 2019 – January 20, 2021	Succeeded by Joey Hood; Acting
