= Tim Lenderking =

American diplomat

Timothy A. Lenderking
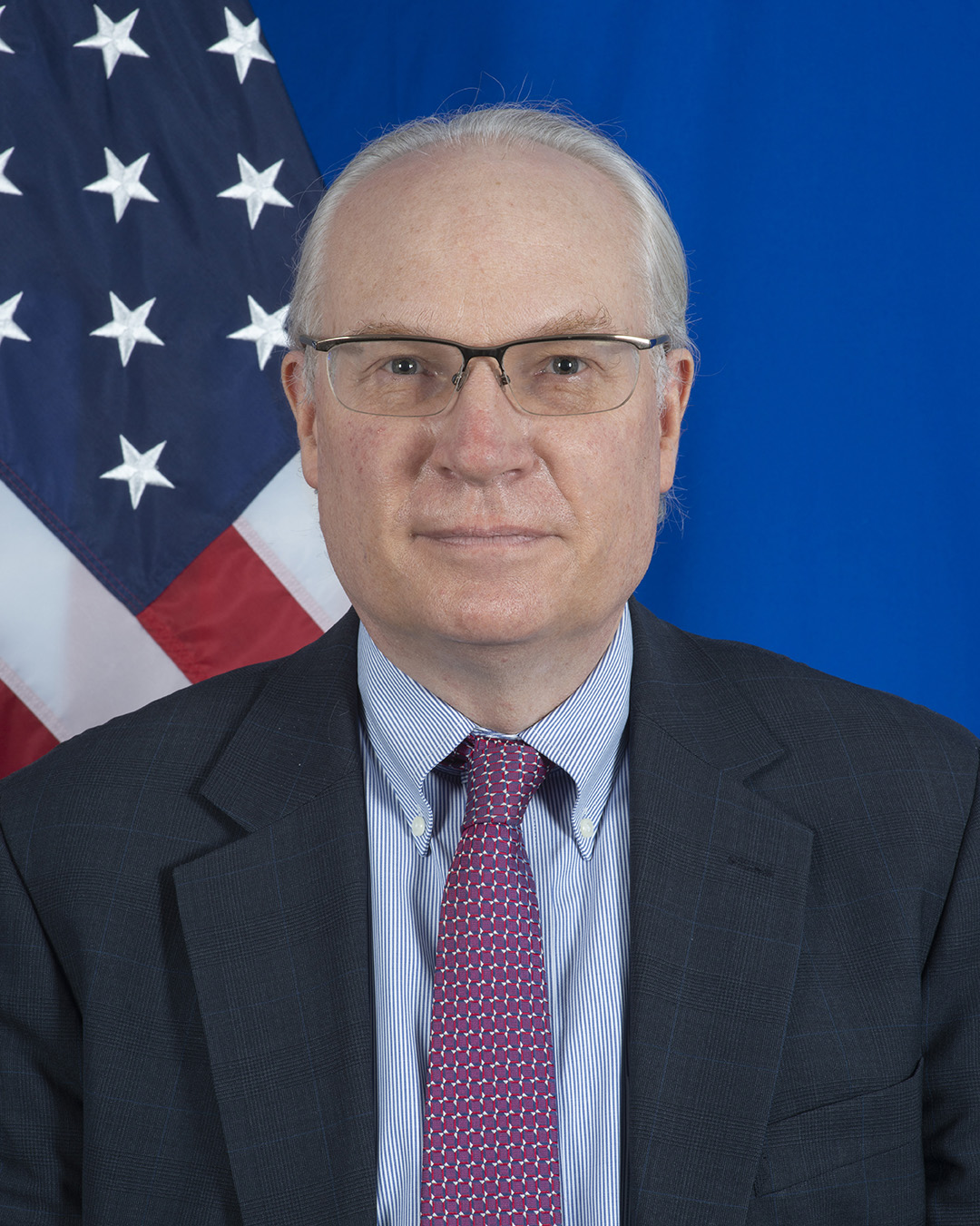

U.S. Special Envoy for Yemen
- In office February 4, 2021 – January 20, 2025
- President: Joe Biden
- Preceded by: Position established
- Succeeded by: TBD

Deputy Assistant Secretary for Iraq, Iran, and Regional Multilateral Affairs; Bureau of Near Eastern Affairs
- In office January 25, 2021 – January 20, 2025

Personal details
- Education: Wesleyan University (Bachelors), University of Washington (Masters in History and International Relations)

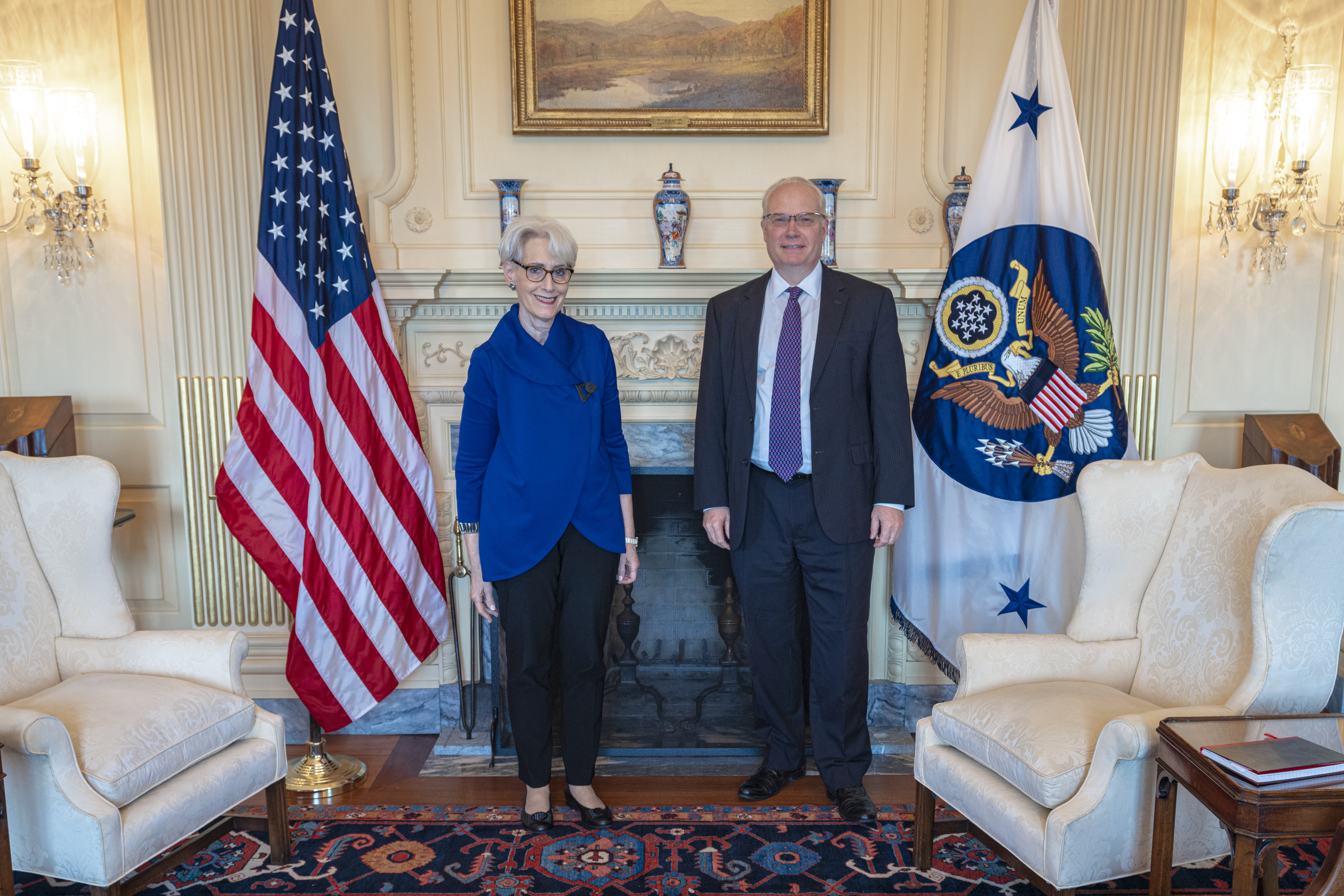
Lenderking and Deputy Secretary of State Wendy Sherman at the U.S. Department of State in Washington, D.C., on June 14, 2021.

Timothy A. Lenderking is an American diplomat who served as the first United States special envoy for Yemen from 2021 to 2025.

He is deputy assistant secretary of state for Iran, Iraq, and regional multilateral affairs in the Bureau of Near Eastern Affairs at the United States State Department.
