= John Hurd =

American oil producer

Personal information
- Born: July 2, 1914 Sacramento, California, United States
- Died: September 6, 2001 (aged 87) San Antonio, Texas, United States

Sport
- Sport: Fencing

John Gavin Hurd (July 2, 1914 – September 6, 2001) was an independent oil and gas producer and cattle rancher who was tapped by Richard Nixon to be the U.S. ambassador to South Africa (1970-1975) under President Nixon. He also competed as a fencer in the 1936 Olympics.

== Early life ==
While a student at Harvard College, where he studied Italian renaissance history, Hurd was captain of the fencing team and competed in the men’s team foil event at the 1936 Summer Olympics. Hurd graduated in 1934 and graduated from Harvard Law School in 1937.

Hurd took up fencing because he failed to make the boxing and football teams.

During World War II, he served in the United States Navy as a surface warfare officer on destroyer escorts in the North Atlantic and was awarded a Bronze Star. As a result of his ROTC scholarship, he was commissioned as an ensign in 1934. He went on active duty in 1941 retired from the Navy with the rank of commander in 1946.

== Career ==
Prior to his naval service, Hurd practiced law in San Francisco with Pillsbury, Madison & Sutro and, subsequently, as an in-house attorney with Standard Oil of California. Following the war he started Killam & Hurd with his brother-in-law Radcliffe Killam. It was a Laredo, Texas based independent oil and gas exploration and production company. In 1982, he founded Hurd Enterprises, Ltd. in San Antonio, which was also an oil and gas exploration and production company.

.

Hurd became active in the Republican Party in Texas in the 1950s and was a delegate to the Republican Presidential Conventions of 1964 and 1968. Hurd was Deputy State Chairman of the Republican Party in Texas in 1967-68, and chairman of the Texas Nixon for President Committee in 1968. He was originally nominated for ambassadorship to Venezuela, but it was later withdrawn.

== Death ==
Hurd died in his home, aged 87, of heart failure.

Diplomatic posts
Preceded by William M. Rountree	United States Ambassador to South Africa; July 24, 1970– April 7, 1975	Succeeded by William G. Bowdler
