= Constance Berry Newman =

American attorney and diplomat

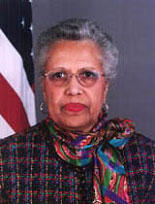

14th United States Assistant Secretary of State for African Affairs
- In office July 24, 2004 – April 21, 2005
- President: George W. Bush
- Preceded by: Walter H. Kansteiner III
- Succeeded by: Jendayi Frazer

Director of the United States Office of Personnel Management
- In office 1989–1992
- President: George H. W. Bush
- Preceded by: Constance Horner
- Succeeded by: Kay Coles James

Personal details
- Born: Constance Ernestine Berry; July 8, 1935 (age 91) Chicago, Illinois, U.S.
- Party: Republican
- Education: Bates College (BA); University of Minnesota (JD)

Constance Ernestine Berry Newman (born July 8, 1935, in Chicago, Illinois) is an American attorney and diplomat who served as the United States assistant secretary of state for African affairs from July 2004 to April 2005.

== Early life and education ==
Constance Berry Newman is the daughter of a social worker and nurse. Her father was a physician. She received her high school diploma from Tuskegee Institute High School, located on the campus of the Tuskegee University, where she was an honor roll student and active in the Government Club, in 1951. She earned a B.S. in Political Science from Bates College and a Juris Doctor from the University of Minnesota Law School in 1959.

== Career ==
Newman worked as a clerk typist, personnel assistant, and personnel manager with the United States Department of the Interior from 1962 to 1967. She worked with migrant farmers in the Office of Economic Development from 1967 to 1969. From 1969 to 1971 she served as Special Assistant to Elliot Richardson, who headed what is now known as the Department of Health and Human Services. In 1971, Richard Nixon appointed Newman to serve as director of AmeriCorps VISTA, the domestic arm of the Peace Corps. She served as the Commissioner and Vice Chair of the U.S. Consumer Product Safety Commission from 1973 to 1976. Newman oversaw the consumer unit focused on Indian and elderly affairs as the Assistant Director of the United States Department of Housing and Urban Development from 1976 to 1977. She co-founded Newman and Hermanson Company, a consulting firm specializing in the government regulatory procedures from 1977.

She worked as President of the Institute of American Business from 1982 to 1984, and as a Private Consultant from 1984 to 1987 on issues related to Africa, working on a World Bank project in which she lived and worked in the Southern African country of Lesotho. Newman received the "Secretary of Defense Medal for Outstanding Public Service" in 1985. She worked as the Cooperative Housing Foundation consultant on a World Bank project in Lesotho to merge existing housing corporations into one that was structured to receive World Bank funding from 1987 to 1988. She then served as the Director of the United States Office of Personnel Management from 1989 to 1992. Newman received the "Central State University" award in 1991. She began a serious undertaking of re-inventing of the OPM, involving unions, the personnel community, managers' associations in strategic planning for federal human resources management. Also, she focused on civil servants' role in delivering critical public services. As Under Secretary of the Smithsonian Institution from 1992 to 2000, she received the Joseph Henry Medal in 2000, the Smithsonian's highest award for recognition of her distinguished service, achievements and contributions to the prestige and growth of the Smithsonian Institution. At around the same time, from 1995 to 2001, she was a Board Member and Vice Chair of the District of Columbia Financial Responsibility and Management Assistance Authority, and from 1998 to 2001 as a Board Member of the International Republican Institute. She won the "Washingtonian of the Year" award in 1998.

Newman served as the Assistant Administrator for Africa of the United States Agency for International Development from November 2001 to June 2004. USAID is the government agency that administers economic and humanitarian assistance worldwide. On June 24, 2004, President George W. Bush appointed her Assistant Secretary of State for African Affairs. She had a central role in several aspects of U.S. Africa policy. She helped determine that "genocide has been committed" in Sudan's Darfur region for Colin Powell's speech in September 2004.

She resigned in April 2005 and was succeeded by Jendayi Frazer. She is a member of the board of directors of the International Republican Institute.

In 2019, she was announced as one of the members of the inaugural class of the Government Hall of Fame, a project created by the business publication Government Executive.

Political offices
Preceded by Walter H. Kansteiner III	United States Assistant Secretary of State for African Affairs; 2004–2005	Succeeded by Jendayi Frazer
