= William G. Bowdler =

American diplomat (1924–2016)

7th Director of the Bureau of Intelligence and Research
- In office April 24, 1978 – December 17, 1979
- Preceded by: Harold H. Saunders
- Succeeded by: Ronald I. Spiers

20th Assistant Secretary of State for Inter-American Affairs
- In office January 4, 1980 – January 16, 1981
- Preceded by: Viron P. Vaky
- Succeeded by: Thomas O. Enders

Personal details
- Born: March 27, 1924 Buenos Aires, Argentina
- Died: January 19, 2016 (aged 91)
- Education: University of Richmond (BA); Tufts University (MA)

William Garton Bowdler (March 27, 1924 – January 19, 2016) was an American diplomat.

== Biography ==
William G. Bowdler was born in Buenos Aires, Argentina on March 27, 1924. He later immigrated to Florida, and served in the U.S. Army from 1944 to 1946. He became a U.S. citizen in 1945. He was educated at the University of Richmond, receiving a B.A. in history in 1948. He then attended The Fletcher School of Law and Diplomacy, receiving an M.A. in 1949.

In 1950, Bowdler joined the United States Department of State as a research assistant. In 1951, he became an international administration officer, and from 1952 to 1956, he was an international relations officer in the Bureau of Inter-American Affairs. He spent 1956 through 1961 as a political and consular officer in Havana.

Bowdler then served as an international relations officer from 1961 to 1963. He spent 1963-64 as the State Department's Deputy Coordinator of Cuban Affairs, and then served as executive liaison officer for Latin American affairs with the White House from 1964 through 1968.

In 1968, President of the United States Lyndon B. Johnson chose Bowdler as United States Ambassador to El Salvador, and Bowdler held this post from November 15, 1968, until September 2, 1971. In 1971, President Richard Nixon appointed him United States Ambassador to Guatemala, and he filled this post from October 19, 1971, through August 26, 1973.

Bowdler returned to the United States in 1973, becoming Deputy Assistant Secretary of State for Inter-American Affairs; he served as Acting Assistant Secretary of State for Inter-American Affairs in 1974.

President Gerald Ford appointed Bowdler as United States Ambassador to South Africa in 1975, with Bowdler filling this post from May 14, 1975, until April 19, 1978.

In 1978, President Jimmy Carter nominated Bowdler as Director of the Bureau of Intelligence and Research and Bowdler held this office from April 24, 1978, to December 17, 1979. Carter then named Bowdler Assistant Secretary of State for Inter-American Affairs, and Bowdler held that office from January 4, 1980, until January 16, 1981.

Diplomatic posts
Preceded by Raul Hector Castro	United States Ambassador to El Salvador; November 15, 1968 – September 2, 1971	Succeeded by Henry E. Catto Jr.
Preceded by Nathaniel Davis	United States Ambassador to Guatemala; October 19, 1971 – August 26, 1973	Succeeded by Francis E. Meloy Jr.
Preceded by John G. Hurd	United States Ambassador to South Africa; May 14, 1975 – April 19, 1978	Succeeded by William B. Edmondson
Government offices
Preceded by Harold H. Saunders	Director of the Bureau of Intelligence and Research; April 24, 1978 – September 19, 1979	Succeeded by Ronald I. Spiers
Preceded by Viron P. Vaky	Assistant Secretary of State for Inter-American Affairs; January 4, 1980 – January 16, 1981	Succeeded by Thomas O. Enders
