= Walter H. Kansteiner III =

American politician (born 1955)

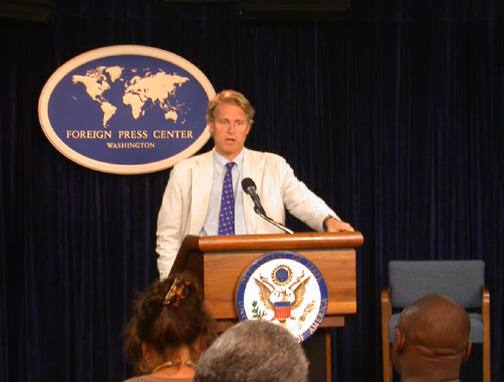

13th United States Assistant Secretary of State for African Affairs
- In office 4 June 2001 – 1 November 2003
- President: George W. Bush
- Preceded by: Susan Rice
- Succeeded by: Constance Berry Newman

Personal details
- Born: November 11, 1955 (age 70) Evanston, Illinois
- Party: Democratic
- Spouse: Frances "Franny" Kansteiner
- Children: 2
- Education: Washington and Lee University (B.A., 1977); American University (M.A., 1981); Virginia Theological Seminary (M.T.S., 1985)

Walter H. Kansteiner III (born November 14, 1955) is an American businessman and politician who served as the United States Assistant Secretary of State for African Affairs from June 2001 until November 2003.

== Career ==
In the late 1980s, Kansteiner was appointed Director of Economic Studies at the Institute on Religion and Democracy. In May 1989, Kansteiner joined the State Department's policy planning staff as Africa director. He served in this position until June 1991, when he moved to the National Security Council as director for African affairs. In April 1992, he was appointed as the National Security Council Deputy Press Secretary.

As a founding principal of The Scowcroft Group, Kansteiner has advised corporations on mergers, acquisitions and privatizations throughout Africa in the telecommunications, forestry, mining, financial services, health care, and aviation industries. Kansteiner advised the buy side on the $1.3 billion privatization of Telkom South Africa, to date the largest privatization in Africa. He also was executive vice president of W. H. Kansteiner, Inc. in Chicago, an agricultural commodity trading and manufacturing company specializing in tropical commodities in the developing world.

In June 2001 he was appointed as Assistant Secretary of State for African Affairs. In 2003, he left the post, citing family reasons. He was appointed in April 2004 as independent non-executive director to the board of Spescom Limited.

Kansteiner is on the board of directors of the Corporate Council on Africa, African Development Foundation, and Sierra Rutile.

=== Family ===
Kansteiner is married; has two children, Beverly and Chalker; and resides in Middleburg, Virginia. His wife, Frances Kansteiner, is from Alabama. Her father, William Houston Blount, ran Vulcan Materials for many years, and his brother, Winton M. "Red" Blount, was Postmaster General in Richard Nixon's cabinet. Red and his brother, Houston, founded Blount Brothers Construction, a large construction and manufacturing firm formerly headquartered in Montgomery. It was later renamed Blount International and moved to Portland, Oregon.

Frances Kansteiner was an officer, director, and advisor to the WILD Foundation. She also on the board of Stratford Hall.

=== Memberships and affiliations ===
- United States Department of Defense, Strategic Minerals Task Force
- Senior Associate of The Forum for International Policy
- Member of Council on Foreign Relations
- Senior Associate of the Center for Strategic and International Studies
- Steering Committee and International Advisory Board Member of New Global Economy Project
- Board member of WildlifeDirect

Political offices
Preceded by Susan E. Rice	United States Assistant Secretary of State for African Affairs; 2001–2003	Succeeded by Constance Berry Newman
