= William B. Edmondson =

American diplomat (1927–2013)

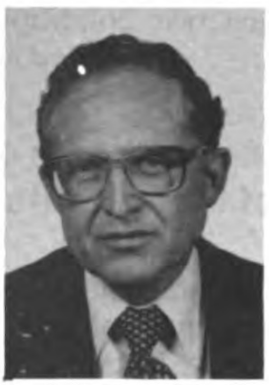

US Ambassador to South Africa
- In office May 3, 1978 – July 22, 1981
- President: Jimmy Carter
- Preceded by: William G. Bowdler
- Succeeded by: Herman W. Nickel

William Brockway Edmondson (February 6, 1927 – December 5, 2013) was an American diplomat in the United States Foreign Service, who served as the United States Ambassador to South Africa from 1978-1981.

== Biography ==
Edmondson was born in St. Joseph, Missouri, but spent his formative years in Nebraska. After graduating from high school in Peru, Nebraska, he joined the U.S. Army, serving from 1944 to 1948 and reaching the rank of First Lieutenant. He received an A.B. from the University of Nebraska in 1950 and an M.A. from the Fletcher School of Law and Diplomacy at Tufts University in 1951.

Edmondson joined the United States Department of State as an intern in 1951. Later that same year he married the former Donna Elizabeth Kiechel, whom he had met at the University of Nebraska. In 1952 he was appointed as Vice Consul and deputy principal officer in Dar es Salaam, Tanganyika, where he served from 1953 to 1955. From 1955 to 1957, he was economic officer in Bern, Switzerland. In 1957-58, he pursued African area studies at Northwestern University.

From 1958 to 1960 Edmondson was an intelligence research specialist at the State Department. In 1960 and 1961 he was acting chief of the West Africa Division of the Bureau of Intelligence and Research. He was political officer in Accra, Ghana from 1961 to 1964, and officer in charge of Ghana affairs at the State Department from 1964 to 1965.

Edmondson was deputy chief of mission in Lusaka, Zambia, from 1965 to 1969. He attended the National War College in 1969-70 and served as educational and cultural affairs officer at the State Department in 1970 and 1971. From 1971 to 1974, he was Director of the Office of African Programs in the Bureau of Educational and Cultural Affairs. From 1974 to 1976, Edmondson was Deputy Chief of Mission in South Africa. From 1976 to 1978 he served as Deputy Assistant Secretary for African Affairs at the State Department.

In 1978, Edmondson was appointed by President Jimmy Carter as the U.S. Ambassador to the Republic of South Africa. His appointment came at a time of major political and social upheaval in that country, following the Soweto uprising and the murder of student activist Steve Biko. It also came at a time of high tension between the white minority South African government and the Carter Administration. As U.S. envoy, Edmondson was the public face of what many conservative South African whites considered to be a hostile American government, given the U.S. government's condemnation of apartheid in South Africa and its vocal support for civil and political rights and democratic reform leading to majority rule. His service in South Africa effectively voiced those policies. His departure, six months into Ronald Reagan's Administration, was heralded by the Afrikaans press and the white National Party, both of which hoped for better relations with the new administration. (In fact, the Reagan Administration's subsequent adoption of the policy of constructive engagement in many ways rewarded those hopes, until that policy was ended by the enactment of economic sanctions by the U.S. Congress in 1986, overriding President Reagan's veto.)

Following the completion of his service as the American Ambassador to South Africa in 1981, Edmondson served in the Inspector General’s Office at the U.S. Department of State, eventually as Deputy Inspector General. He retired from the State Department in 1986.

Edmondson was married to Donna Kiechel Edmondson of Prescott, Arizona. They had two children.

Diplomatic posts
Preceded by William G. Bowdler	United States Ambassador to South Africa; 1978–1981	Succeeded by Herman W. Nickel
