= Eric M. Bost =

American diplomat

Eric Michael Bost
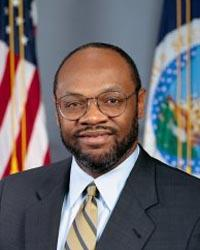

United States Ambassador to South Africa
- In office 20 July 2006 – 20 January 2009
- President: George W. Bush
- Preceded by: Jendayi Elizabeth Frazer
- Succeeded by: Donald Gips

Personal details
- Born: Concord, North Carolina
- Party: Republican

Eric Michael Bost is the former United States Ambassador to South Africa. He was sworn in as U.S. Ambassador to the Republic of South Africa by President George W. Bush on July 20, 2006, after being confirmed by the U.S. Senate on June 29. Bost presented his credentials to South African President Thabo Mbeki on August 15, 2006. He completed his tour as ambassador on January 20, 2009.

Bost previously served as Under Secretary for Food, Nutrition, and Consumer Services (FNCS) at the U.S. Department of Agriculture from 2001 to 2006 under Ann Veneman. Before his appointment to that position, Bost served as Commissioner and chief executive officer of the Texas Department of Human Services (DHS) for four years.

As FNCS Under Secretary, Bost was responsible for the administration of the fifteen USDA nutrition assistance programs with a combined budget of over $58 billion, including the Food Stamp Program, the Special Supplemental Nutrition Program for Women, Infants and Children (WIC), the National School Lunch and School Breakfast Programs, and the Commodity Distribution Programs.

During his tenure at the Department of Agriculture, Bost led an expanded U.S. initiative to promote improved nutrition and food security in South Africa, Sierra Leone, Ethiopia, Hong Kong, Brazil, Tanzania, Swaziland, Mozambique, Uganda, Madagascar, Chile, United Kingdom, Argentina, Mexico, Israel, Italy, China and Japan.

A native of Concord, North Carolina, Bost holds a B.A. degree in psychology from the University of North Carolina at Chapel Hill and an M.A. degree in Special Education from the University of South Florida.

Diplomatic posts
Preceded by Jendayi Frazer	United States Ambassador to South Africa; 2006–2009	Succeeded by Donald Gips
