= Phillips Talbot =

American diplomat

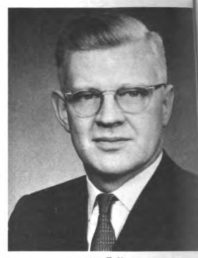

United States Ambassador to Greece
- In office 1965–1969
- President: Lyndon B. Johnson
- Preceded by: Henry Labouisse
- Succeeded by: Henry J. Tasca

6th Assistant Secretary of State for Near Eastern and South Asian Affairs
- In office 1961–1964
- President: John F. Kennedy; Lyndon B. Johnson
- Preceded by: G. Lewis Jones
- Succeeded by: Raymond A. Hare

Personal details
- Born: June 7, 1915 Pittsburgh, Pennsylvania, U.S.
- Died: October 1, 2010 (aged 95) Washington, D.C., U.S.
- Education: University of Illinois, Urbana-Champaign

William Phillips Talbot (June 7, 1915 – October 1, 2010) was a United States Ambassador to Greece (1965–69) and, at his death, member of the American Academy of Diplomacy, the Council of American Ambassadors and the Council on Foreign Relations.

== Early life ==
Talbot was born in Pittsburgh, Pennsylvania and served in the United States Navy during World War II.

== Career ==
=== Journalism ===
After graduating from the University of Illinois in 1936, Talbot started as a reporter for the Chicago Daily News, where he remained from 1936 to 1938. In 1939, having been turned down for a foreign correspondent position, he left the Chicago Daily News to take a position with the Institute of Current World Affairs in India where he reported on the Indian independence movement. The Phillips Talbot Fellowship was named in his honor and is awarded yearly by the Institute to promising young journalists.

=== Politics ===
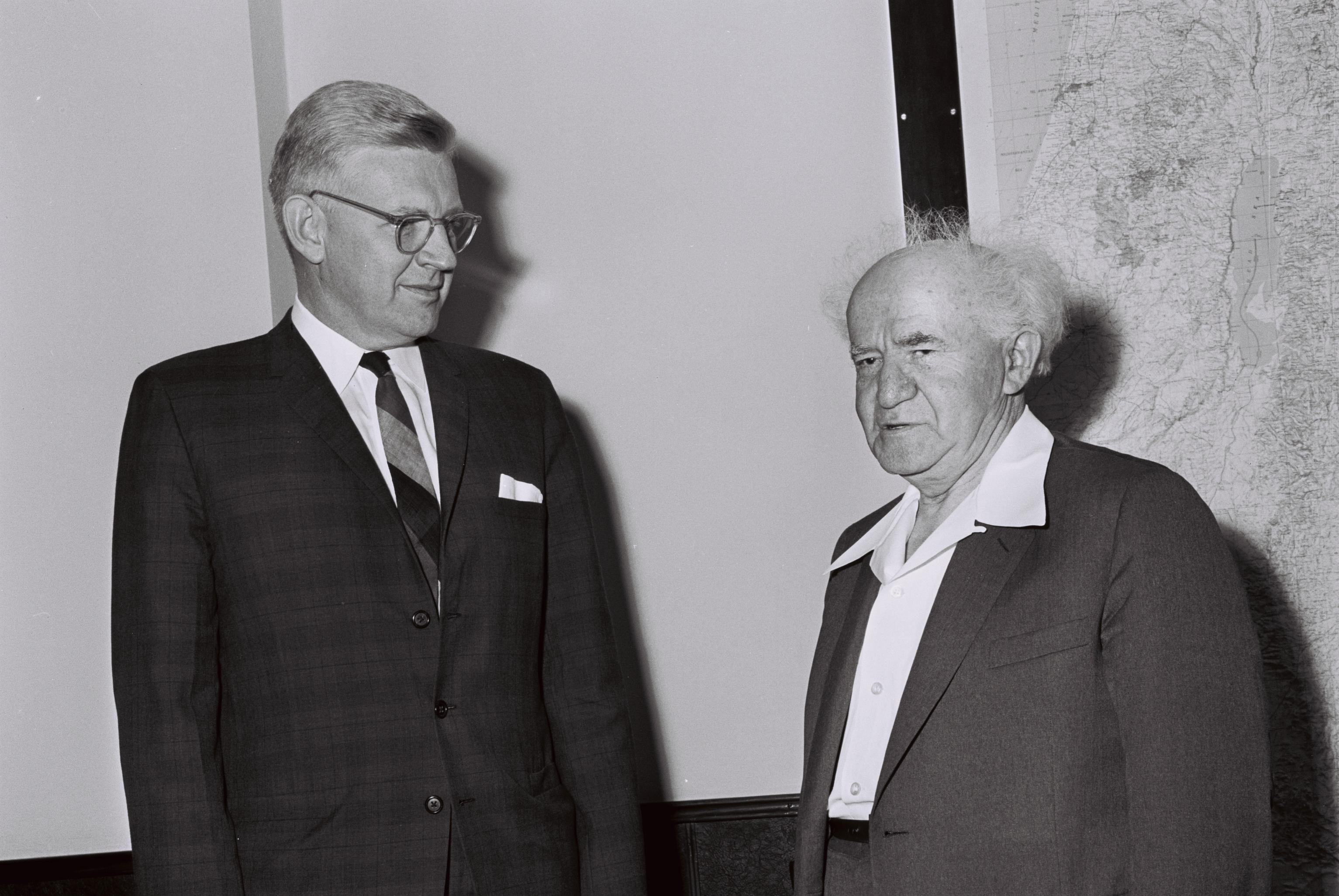
Phillips Talbot, United States Assistant Secretary of State for Near Eastern and South Asian affairs, meeting Israel's PM David Ben-Gurion in Jerusalem

Talbot was the United States Assistant Secretary of State for Near Eastern and South Asian affairs from 1961-65 during the Kennedy and Johnson administrations.

Talbot served as President of Asia Society from 1970-1982 and was awarded the Padma Shri in March 2002 for his efforts in fomenting peace between India and America during his tenure as President.

Government offices
| Preceded by G. Lewis Jones | Assistant Secretary of State for Near Eastern and South Asian Affairs; April 21, 1961 – September 1, 1965 | Succeeded by Raymond A. Hare |
Diplomatic posts
| Preceded by Henry Richardson Labouisse, Jr. | United States Ambassador to Greece; 1965–1969 | Succeeded by Henry J. Tasca |
