= William M. Rountree =

American diplomat

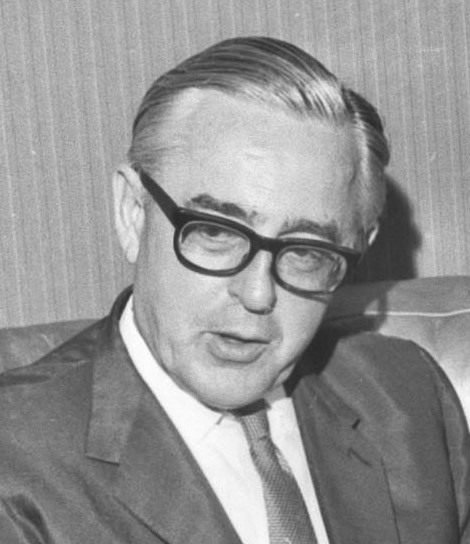
- Rountree in 1971

4th Assistant Secretary of State for Near Eastern, South Asian, and African Affairs
- In office August 30, 1956 – July 6, 1959
- Preceded by: George V. Allen
- Succeeded by: G. Lewis Jones

Personal details
- Born: March 28, 1917 Swainsboro, Georgia, U.S.
- Died: November 3, 1995 (aged 78) Gainesville, Florida, U.S.
- Parent(s): William Manning Rountree Sr. Clyde Branan Rountree

William "Bill" Manning Rountree, Jr. (March 28, 1917 – November 3, 1995) was an American diplomat who most notably served as U.S. Ambassador to Pakistan (1959–1962), Sudan (1962–1965), South Africa (1965–1970) and to Brazil from 1970 to 1973 (his retirement).

== Early life and education ==
Rountree was born March 28, 1917 in Swainsboro, Georgia, the youngest of seven children, to William Manning Rountree, Sr. (1877–1918), a farmer and a clerk of the county court, and Clyde Branan Rountree (1878–1970). His father died when he was only 18 months old.

The family moved to Atlanta when William Jr. was six, where he attended high school and graduated in 1935. He studied law and graduated from Catholic University Law School (presently Columbus School of Law) in 1941.

== Career ==
After graduating from high school in 1935, Rountree got a job with the United States Department of the Treasury where he held various clerical and accounting positions. He later became involved with the lend-lease program.

In 1942 he transferred to the United States Department of State and was assigned to Cairo, Egypt where he helped organize World War II aid programs. This led to a long diplomatic career in which Rountree specialized in the Middle East and South Asia. During 1948 and 1949 he was assigned to the U.S. Embassy in Athens, Greece, where he helped administer U.S. aid programs to the Greek army which was fighting Communist insurgents. He later held positions in Turkey and Iran. In 1956 he became Assistant Secretary of State for Near Eastern, South Asian and African Affairs. In this position he helped develop U.S. policy involving the Suez Crisis in November 1956 and the U.S. intervention in Lebanon in 1958. Rountree served as Ambassador to Pakistan (1959–1962), Sudan (1962–1965), South Africa (1965–1970), and Brazil (1970–1973).

== Personal life ==
In 1946, Rountree married Suzanne McDowall (later Phillips; 1923–2020), a daughter of John McDowall and Susie W. McDowall (née Skinner), of Fort Douglas, Utah. They had one daughter;

- Susan Hanes Leonard

He retired in May 1973 and settled in Gainesville, Florida, where he died of cancer on November 3, 1995 aged 78.

Government offices
Preceded by George V. Allen	Assistant Secretary of State for Near Eastern, South Asian, and African Affairs; August 30, 1956 – July 6, 1959	Succeeded by G. Lewis Jones
Diplomatic posts
Preceded by James M. Langley	United States Ambassador to Pakistan; 1959–1962	Succeeded by Walter P. McConaughy
Preceded by James S. Moose, Jr.	United States Ambassador to Sudan; 1962–1965	Succeeded by William H. Weathersby
Preceded by Joseph C. Satterthwaite	United States Ambassador to South Africa; 1966–1970	Succeeded by John G. Hurd
Preceded by Charles Burke Elbrick	United States Ambassador to Brazil; 1970–1973	Succeeded by John Hugh Crimmins
