= Jendayi Frazer =

American diplomat (born 1961)

Dr. Jendayi Frazer
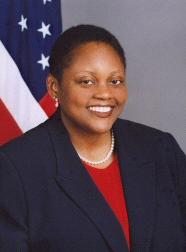

15th Assistant Secretary of State for African Affairs
- In office August 29, 2005 – January 20, 2009
- President: George W. Bush
- Preceded by: Constance Berry Newman
- Succeeded by: Johnnie Carson

United States Ambassador to South Africa
- In office May 25, 2004 – August 26, 2005
- President: George W. Bush
- Preceded by: Cameron R. Hume
- Succeeded by: Eric M. Bost

Personal details
- Born: 1961 (age 64–65) Virginia
- Party: Republican

Jendayi Elizabeth Frazer (born 1961) is the former U.S. Assistant Secretary of State for African Affairs, heading the Bureau of African Affairs. She was a Distinguished Service Professor at Carnegie Mellon University's Heinz College and Department of Social and Decision Sciences.

== Background ==
Before taking on her position in the Bush Administration, Frazer was special assistant to the president and senior director for African affairs on the National Security Council and the first woman to serve as United States Ambassador to South Africa. Prior to entering government in 2001, Frazer was an assistant professor for public policy at Harvard Kennedy School at Harvard University from 1995 to 2001. She was assistant professor at the Josef Korbel School of International Studies at the University of Denver and editor of the journal Africa Today from 1993 to 1995. She graduated from Stanford University with a B.A. in political science with honors and African-American Studies with distinction; obtained two M.A. degrees in international policy studies and international development education; and a Ph.D. in political science. During her time at Stanford, former Secretary of State Condoleezza Rice served as a faculty member in the Political Science department.

Frazer is a specialist in African affairs and international security affairs. During her tenure at the National Security Council, she was instrumental in the decisions that led to establishing the $15 billion President's Emergency Plan for HIV/AID Relief (PEPFAR) as well as the Millennium Challenge Account that has contributed to raising U.S. assistance to Africa to a historic high of $4.1 billion in 2006. Frazer is also given credit for designing the administration's policy for ending the wars in the Democratic Republic of the Congo, Sierra Leone, Liberia, and Burundi. She is known for statements condemning armed movements in Africa and in favor of peaceful opposition movements to bring about democratic political and social change throughout the continent.

Frazer's tenure as Assistant Secretary of State was a controversial one: She was considered one of the most powerful and outspoken Assistant Secretaries in the Bush Administration. Yet, an August 2009 report by the State Department's Office of the Inspector General reviewed 50 years of Africa policy and criticized the Africa Bureau describing it as low resourced and being hobbled by low morale, and a lack of qualified personnel and a "failed" public diplomacy program. The report focused on 50 years of the bureau's history and not specifically Frazer's tenure. The Inspector General's office criticized the Africa Bureau while Africa policy under the Bush Administration was widely heralded as one of the Administration's most successful foreign policy achievements. John Bolton, the Bush Administration's Ambassador to the United Nations, accused Frazer of setting back his plans to end the U.N. Mission in Eritrea-Ethiopia that monitored and acted as an interposition force along the disputed border between Ethiopia and Eritrea by unilaterally deciding that the 2002 decision of the Ethiopian-Eritrean Boundary Commission should be cast aside to favor Ethiopia's position. Frazer disputed Bolton's claim since U.S. policy continued to recognize the EEBC decision.

Frazer has also been accused of quietly encouraging Ethiopia's decision to militarily intervene in Somalia in late 2006, a contradiction of the administration's official position. Administration officials denied these claims.

== Recent events ==
On January 7, 2007, Frazer met with Somali political leaders in Nairobi, Kenya, to discuss United States support for the interim Somali government. Later that day she cancelled a planned trip to Mogadishu, Somalia, due to the media revealing the details of her itinerary and riots in the city the day before over a faulty disarmament plan. The U.S. envoy, the highest ranking in 14 years, made a surprise visit to Somalia on April 7, 2007. She visited Ali Mohammed Ghedi and Abdullahi Yusuf Ahmed to help with the national reconciliation of Somalia.

On January 4, 2008, Frazer was sent by President George W. Bush to Kenya to help seek a resolution of that country's political dispute following the December 2007 presidential election, and she met with President Mwai Kibaki and opposition leader Raila Odinga.

On April 24, 2008, Frazer noted that Zimbabwe opposition leader Morgan Tsvangirai of the Movement for Democratic Change won the disputed Zimbabwean presidential election, 2008, and stated that President Robert Mugabe should step down.

On May 25, 2008, Mugabe delivered a speech that mentioned Frazer in negative terms: "You saw the joy that the British had, that the Americans had, and saw them here through their representatives celebrating and acting as if we [Zimbabwe] are either an extension of Britain or ... America. You saw that little American girl [Frazer] trotting around the globe like a prostitute ..."

As of late October 2008, she has been put in charge of issues concerning the Conflict in North Kivu.

In late August 2009, Frazer criticized the Obama Administration's senior officials' statements that they must practice "tough love" with Africans. She asserts that Obama should reorient his administration's policy away from patronizing notions of "tough love" to better emphasize the U.S.'s strategic interests in Africa.

Frazer has been critical of the International Criminal Court, accusing it in 2015 of unfairly targeting African leaders accused of fomenting violence.

On August 8, 2016, Frazer became one of fifty senior national security and government experts to sign a letter highly critical of the Republican candidate for the 2016 US presidential election, Donald Trump. The letter stated their belief that Trump was unsuited to assume office, denouncing him as dangerous.

Frazer currently sits on several boards of non-profits and other organizations, including, the Atlantic Council, The Mastercard Foundation, KBFUS, The Africa Center, Seedo, CoDa. As of January 2023, Frazer is the Duignan Distinguished Visiting Fellow at the Hoover Institute, Stanford University and a member of the Aspen Institute.

== Quotes ==
This issue of insurgency is one that continues to trouble me and Africa as a whole. The way forward is development and legitimate opposition, not through picking up arms and insurgency, and it's a message the A.U. needs to make much more loudly to its member states. – Frazer in a press conference discussing instability in the horn of Africa.

Diplomatic posts
Preceded by Cameron R. Hume	United States Ambassador to South Africa; 2004–2005	Succeeded by Eric M. Bost
Political offices
Preceded by Constance Berry Newman	United States Assistant Secretary of State for African Affairs; 2005–2009	Succeeded by Johnnie Carson
