= Edward J. Perkins =

American diplomat (1928–2020)

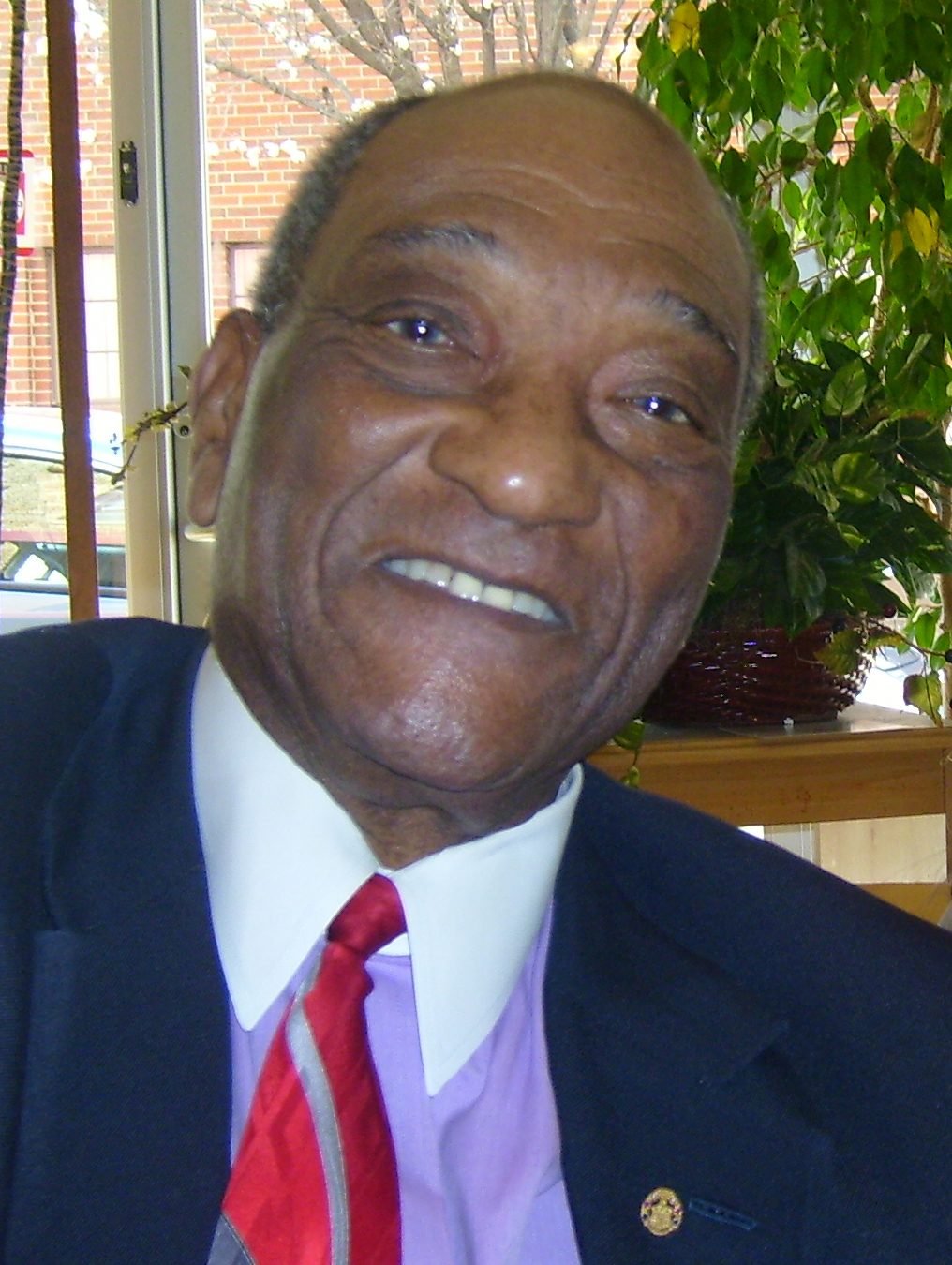
- Perkins in 2007

19th United States Ambassador to Australia
- In office November 24, 1993 – July 19, 1996
- President: Bill Clinton
- Preceded by: Mel Sembler
- Succeeded by: Genta H. Holmes

19th United States Ambassador to the United Nations
- In office May 12, 1992 – January 27, 1993
- President: George H. W. Bush; Bill Clinton
- Preceded by: Thomas R. Pickering
- Succeeded by: Madeleine Albright

19th Director General of the Foreign Service
- In office September 22, 1989 – May 7, 1992
- President: George H. W. Bush
- Preceded by: George S. Vest
- Succeeded by: Genta H. Holmes

United States Ambassador to South Africa
- In office November 27, 1986 – May 22, 1989
- President: Ronald Reagan; George H. W. Bush
- Preceded by: Herman W. Nickel
- Succeeded by: William L. Swing

United States Ambassador to Liberia
- In office August 28, 1985 – October 22, 1986
- President: Ronald Reagan
- Preceded by: William L. Swing
- Succeeded by: James Bishop

Personal details
- Born: Edward Joseph Perkins; June 8, 1928 Sterlington, Louisiana, U.S.
- Died: November 7, 2020 (aged 92) Washington, D.C., U.S.
- Party: Republican
- Spouse: Lucy Chen-mei Liu
- Children: 2
- Education: University of Maryland, University College (BA); University of Southern California (MPA, DPA)

Edward Joseph Perkins (June 8, 1928 – November 7, 2020) was an American career diplomat who served as U.S. Ambassador to Liberia, South Africa, the United Nations, and Australia. He also served as the Director General of the U.S. Department of State's Diplomatic Corps.

== Early life and education ==
Perkins was born in Sterlington, Louisiana. He grew up in Haynesville, Louisiana, on a farm belonging to his grandparents, Nathan and Sarah Stovall Noble. His grandmother regarded learning and academic success as the key to her grandson’s future, and pushed him away from succeeding his grandfather on the farm and towards higher education and study. As a result, Perkins eventually moved - first to Pine Bluff, Arkansas, and then to Portland, Oregon, and graduated there in 1947 from Jefferson High School. It was during this period that he began to consider his dream of becoming a diplomat, after attending a local international relations club meeting at which several consuls general spoke. He earned his B.A. from the University of Maryland, University College in 1967, and his M.A. and Doctor of Public Administration from the University of Southern California. He was an active member of Kappa Alpha Psi fraternity.

== Career ==
Enthusiastic about seeing the wider world beyond the United States, Perkins enlisted in the United States Army, serving for three years. A return to civilian life would prove temporary; he again enlisted, this time in the United States Marine Corps, and served for four years in Japan, Hawaii, and South Korea. This period saw Perkins become interested in the study of Eastern philosophy.

=== Foreign Service ===
Perkins passed the Foreign Service exam in 1971. Through a satellite campus of the University of Southern California, he would later earn his master’s degree in 1972 and a doctorate in 1978, both of which were in public administration.

Concerned with the lack of support for fellow black members of the Foreign Service, Perkins became a founding member of the Thursday Luncheon Group with John W.H. Gravely, a weekly support and advocacy group for black officers. The organization has since grown to a membership of over 300. Perkins also organized members to visit the Congressional Black Caucus and advocate for recruitment programs aimed at minorities, a move which resulted in the creation of Thomas R. Pickering Foreign Affairs Fellowship.

=== Ambassador appointments ===
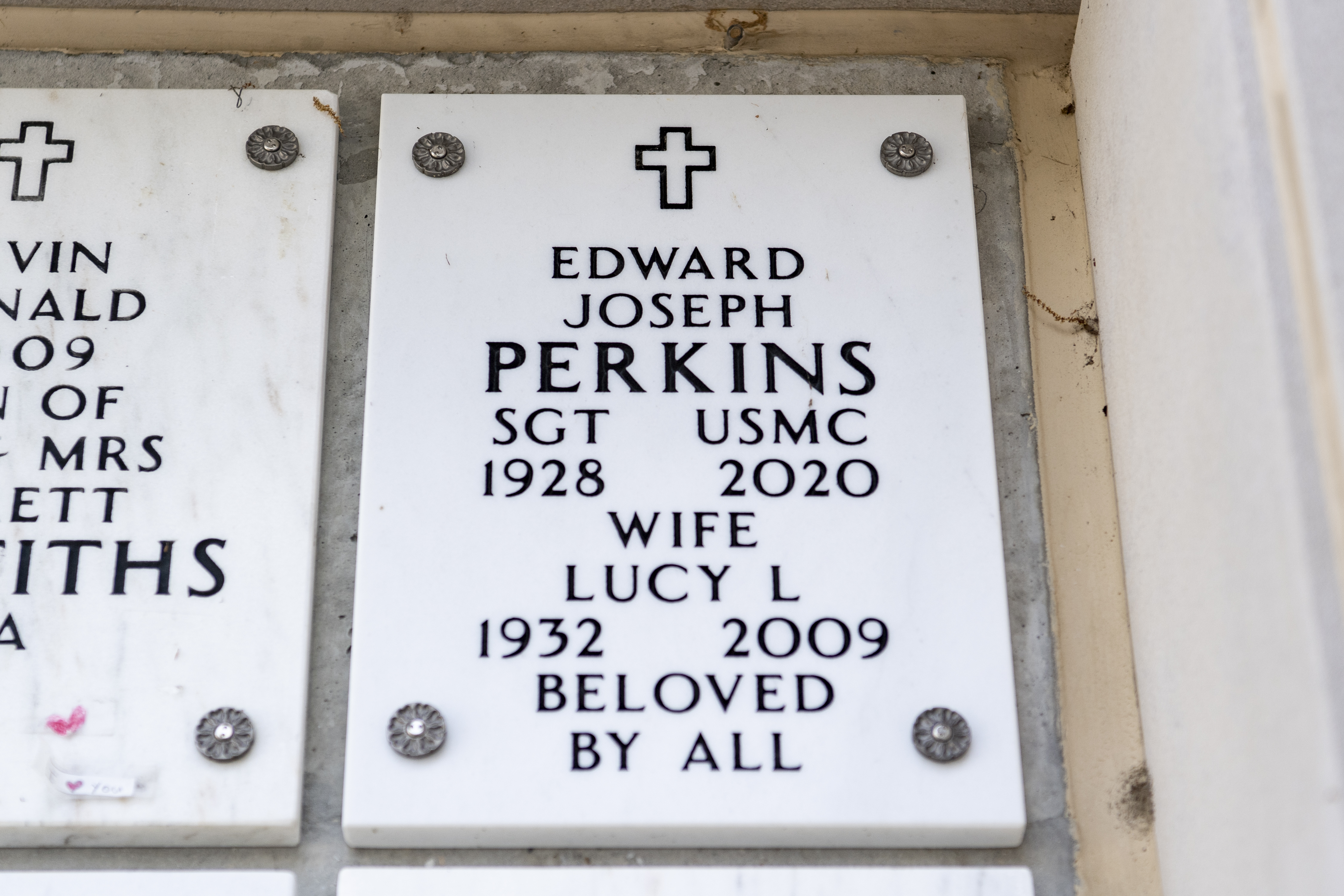
Grave at Arlington National Cemetery

Perkins was appointed ambassador to Liberia in 1985, less than a year after Samuel Doe took control of the country. He described his role as "[insuring] the safety of the numerous Americans in Liberia..." and to "help restore the country to order and rebuild the infrastructure."

Perkins was then appointed ambassador to South Africa in 1986 by President Ronald Reagan. From the beginning, this position would prove to be a challenge – the naming of the black ambassador to the post was seen as a concession by Reagan to ward off sanctions by the United States Congress. Several Black civil rights leaders approached Perkins, advising against accepting the appointment, including the Rev. Jesse Jackson. Perkins, however, decided to accept the appointment regardless, citing his oath of office to 'go where needed', and believing he "might be able to do something in South Africa." During his appointment tenure, Perkins focused on improving communication between blacks, whites, and other ethnic groups in the country, holding integrated receptions, attending church services, and visiting South African towns and villages. He overcame South African black activists’ initial hostility towards him through “carefully chosen shots” at the South African regime that demonstrated solidarity with the country’s victims of apartheid, including attendance at the Delmas Treason Trial.

=== Director General of the Foreign Service ===
Perkins left the post in 1989, to accept the position of Director General of the Foreign Service. During his tenure as the first African-American director general, Perkins instituted policies of recruitment aimed at diversifying the ranks of its officers. Perkins described the ranks of the organization at the time of his hiring as “an exclusive club: overwhelmingly white, male and Ivy-League-educated…”. Efforts at hiring people of color, women, and people from Appalachia were intensified, and it was during this time that the organization recruited its first blind officer, Avraham Rabby.

=== Subsequent appointments ===
He continued to serve in the State Department until 1992, when he was appointed United States Ambassador to the United Nations and U.S. Representative to the United Nations Security Council. In 1993, he was appointed representative to the Commonwealth of Australia, where he served until 1996 before retiring at the rank of Career Minister in the United States Foreign Service.

He taught at the University of Oklahoma where he served as Senior Vice Provost Emeritus of International Programs at the International Program Center, and Professor Emeritus of the School of International and Area Studies. He was a member of the American Academy of Diplomacy.

In 2006, Perkins’ memoir, Mr. Ambassador, Warrior for Peace, was published by the University of Oklahoma Press.

In 2007, Perkins moved to Washington, D.C. On September 3, 2009, his wife, Lucy Cheng-Mei Liu, died.

Perkins died on November 7, 2020, after a stroke.

== Personal life ==
After he was discharged from the Marine Corps, Perkins took a civilian job with the Army and Air Forces Exchange Services in Taiwan. It was during this time that he met his future wife, Lucy Ching-mei Liu. Liu’s traditional Taiwanese family did not want her to marry a black American, necessitating an elopement between the two in Taipei in 1962. They had two children, Katherine and Sarah Perkins, and four grandchildren.

== Writings ==
- Mr. Ambassador, Warrior for Peace (memoirs,) published by The University of Oklahoma Press in 2006.
- The Palestinian Refugees: Old Problems - New Solutions (Studies in peace politics in the Middle East) - co-editor with Joseph Ginat, Sussex Academic Press, 2002.
- The Middle East Peace Process: Vision Versus Reality (Studies in peace politics in the Middle East) - co-editor with Joseph Ginat, Sussex Academic Press, 2002.
- Palestinian Refugees: Traditional Positions and New Solutions = co-editor with Joseph Ginat, University of Oklahoma Press, 2001.
- The seedlings of hope: U.S. policy in Africa, U.S. Department of State, 1989.

Diplomatic posts
Preceded by William L. Swing	United States Ambassador to Liberia; 1985–1986	Succeeded by James Bishop
Preceded by Herman W. Nickel	United States Ambassador to South Africa; 1986–1989	Succeeded by William L. Swing
Preceded by George S. Vest	Director General of the Foreign Service; 1989–1992	Succeeded by Genta H. Holmes
Preceded by Thomas R. Pickering	United States Ambassador to the United Nations; 1992–1993	Succeeded by Madeleine Albright
Preceded by Mel Sembler	United States Ambassador to Australia; 1993–1996	Succeeded by Genta H. Holmes
