= Herman W. Nickel =

American diplomat (born 1928)

- Herman W. Nickel in 1985

United States Ambassador to South Africa
- In office April 20, 1982 – October 4, 1986
- President: Ronald Reagan
- Preceded by: William B. Edmondson
- Succeeded by: Edward J. Perkins

Personal details
- Born: October 23, 1928 Berlin, Weimar Republic
- Party: Democrat
- Education: Union College; Syracuse University College of Law

Herman William Nickel (born October 23, 1928) is an American retired diplomat who served as United States Ambassador to South Africa from 1982 to 1986. He was born in Berlin, Germany and graduated from Union College in Schenectady, New York in the United States in 1951. Nickel married Phyllis Fritchey, daughter of Clayton Fritchey, and had one son, Clayton A. Nickel. He then received a Bachelor of Laws from the Syracuse University College of Law.

== Career ==
President Ronald Reagan announced his intention to nominate Nickel for the post on 24 February 1982. Nickel presented his credentials on April 20, succeeding William B. Edmondson in the post. He was succeeded by Edward Perkins in 1986.

Nickel was a correspondent for Time, Inc. in South Africa, Tokyo, London, and Bonn prior to his appointment.

Diplomatic posts
Preceded by William B. Edmondson	United States Ambassador to South Africa; 1982-1986	Succeeded by Edward J. Perkins
