= Donald Gips =

American diplomat

Don Gips
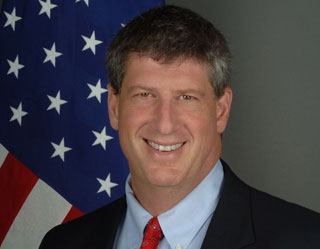
- Official photo of Gips c.2009

United States Ambassador to South Africa
- In office October 1, 2009 – January 2, 2013
- President: Barack Obama
- Preceded by: Eric M. Bost
- Succeeded by: Patrick Gaspard

Director of the White House Presidential Personnel Office
- In office January 20, 2009 – July 2009
- President: Barack Obama
- Preceded by: Joie Gregor
- Succeeded by: Nancy Hogan

Personal details
- Born: Donald Henry Gips; February 1, 1960 (age 66)
- Party: Democratic
- Spouse: Elizabeth Berry
- Children: 3
- Education: Harvard University (BA); Yale University (MBA)

Donald Henry Gips (born February 1, 1960) is a Senior Advisor and the former CEO of the Skoll Foundation. He is a former U.S. Ambassador to the Republic of South Africa from 2009 to 2013. Ambassador Gips was appointed by President Barack Obama on June 4 and confirmed by the Senate on July 7, 2009. He presented his credentials to South African President Jacob Zuma on October 1, 2009. He served until January 2, 2013.

In February 2019, Gips was announced as the incoming CEO of the Skoll Foundation, taking over for the retired Sally Osberg. He began as CEO on April 9, 2019, at the annual Skoll World Forum on Social Entrepreneurship. He was succeeded as CEO by Marla Blow on June 1, 2025.

Previously he was a principal at Albright Stonebridge Group, a global strategic advisory firm. He also leads the firm's Africa practice.

Previously he was the Divisional Vice President of Corporate Strategy and Development for Level 3 Communications and Director of Mindspeed Technologies. He was also on the advisory board for President Barack Obama's presidential transition team.

In the late 1990s Gips served as Vice President Al Gore's Chief Domestic Policy Advisor. Previously, he was the chief of the Federal Communications Commission's international bureau.

He is married to Elizabeth Berry and has three children: Sam, Peter and Ben.

Gips is a graduate of Princeton Day School, Harvard College, and the Yale School of Management.

Diplomatic posts
Preceded by Eric M. Bost	United States Ambassador to South Africa; 2009–2013	Succeeded by Patrick Gaspard
