= North Winship =

Career Foreign Service Officer

North Winship (1885–1968) was a career Foreign Service Officer who served first as Envoy Extraordinary and Minister Plenipotentiary to South Africa, starting in 1948 before being promoted to Ambassador Extraordinary and Plenipotentiary on March 23, 1949 (commissioned to the Union of South Africa).

Winship also served as a Consul General in Montreal and Copenhagen.

As a result of an accord reached in 1987, the “Soviet Government has returned to the National Archives a potpourri of 73-year-old records from the American consulate in Petrograd. The files have 6,250 thin crackling sheets bound with red-white-and-blue twine, containing items like inventories of vodka shipments and coded telegrams about ships carrying military supplies to Murmansk.” The archives cover the time when “Petrograd, which was then the capital, between the February Revolution, which ousted the imperial family, and the November Revolution, which brought the Bolsheviks to power. The most interesting dispatches, [are] Consul North Winship's accounts of the upheavals in Petrograd.”
