= Bureau of Near Eastern Affairs =

U.S. State Department division

- Seal of the United States Department of State

Bureau overview
- Formed: August 24, 1992; 34 years ago
- Preceding bureau: Bureau of Near Eastern and South Asian Affairs
- Jurisdiction: Executive branch of the United States
- Headquarters: Harry S. Truman Building, Washington, D.C., United States
- Employees: 2,125 (as of FY 2016)
- Annual budget: $1.52 billion (FY 2016)
- Bureau executive: Donald Blome, Assistant Secretary of State for Near Eastern Affairs
- Parent department: U.S. Department of State
- Website: state.gov/nea

The Bureau of Near Eastern Affairs (NEA), also known as the Bureau of Near East Asian Affairs, is an agency of the Department of State within the United States government that deals with U.S. foreign policy and diplomatic relations with the nations of the Near East. It is headed by the Assistant Secretary of State for Near Eastern Affairs, who reports to the Under Secretary of State for Political Affairs.

== Organization ==
The offices of the Bureau of Near Eastern Affairs direct, coordinate, and supervise U.S. government activities within the region, including political, economic, consular, public diplomacy, and administrative management issues.

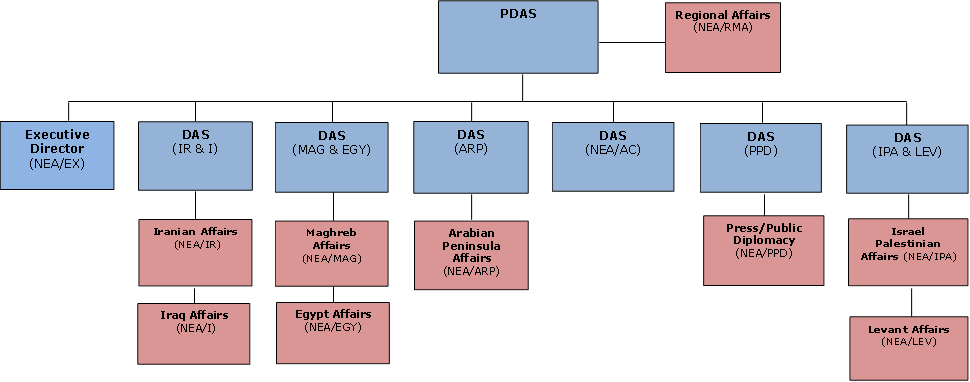
Organizational chart of the Bureau of Near Eastern Affairs

- Office of Levant Affairs – Responsible for U.S. relations with Jordan, Lebanon, and Syria
- Office of North African Affairs – Responsible for U.S. relations with Algeria, Egypt, Libya, Morocco, and Tunisia
- Office of Arabian Peninsula Affairs – Responsible for shaping, coordinating and implementing foreign policy in Bahrain, Kuwait, Oman, Qatar, Saudi Arabia, the United Arab Emirates, and Yemen
- Office of Israel and Palestinian Affairs – Responsible for diplomatic issues associated with the Israeli–Palestinian conflict
- Office of Iraqi Affairs – Oversees Iraq–United States relations
- Office of Iranian Affairs – Develops, coordinates, recommends, and executes U.S. policy on Iran
- Office of Regional and Multilateral Affairs – Responsible for regional political and economic issues, including political-military affairs, multilateral organizations, labor and social affairs, counternarcotics, environment, refugees, counterterrorism, and human rights
- Office of Press and Public Diplomacy – Responsible for the coordination of public diplomacy activities in the NEA region, and preparing press guidance for the Department Spokesperson in the Bureau of Public Affairs
- Office of Middle East Partnership Initiative – Responsible for programming in support of reform throughout the region, with special emphasis on empowering women and youth, education, strengthening economies, and broadening political participation

== See also ==
Assistant Secretary of State for Near Eastern Affairs
