= Henry A. Crumpton =

American diplomat (born 1957)

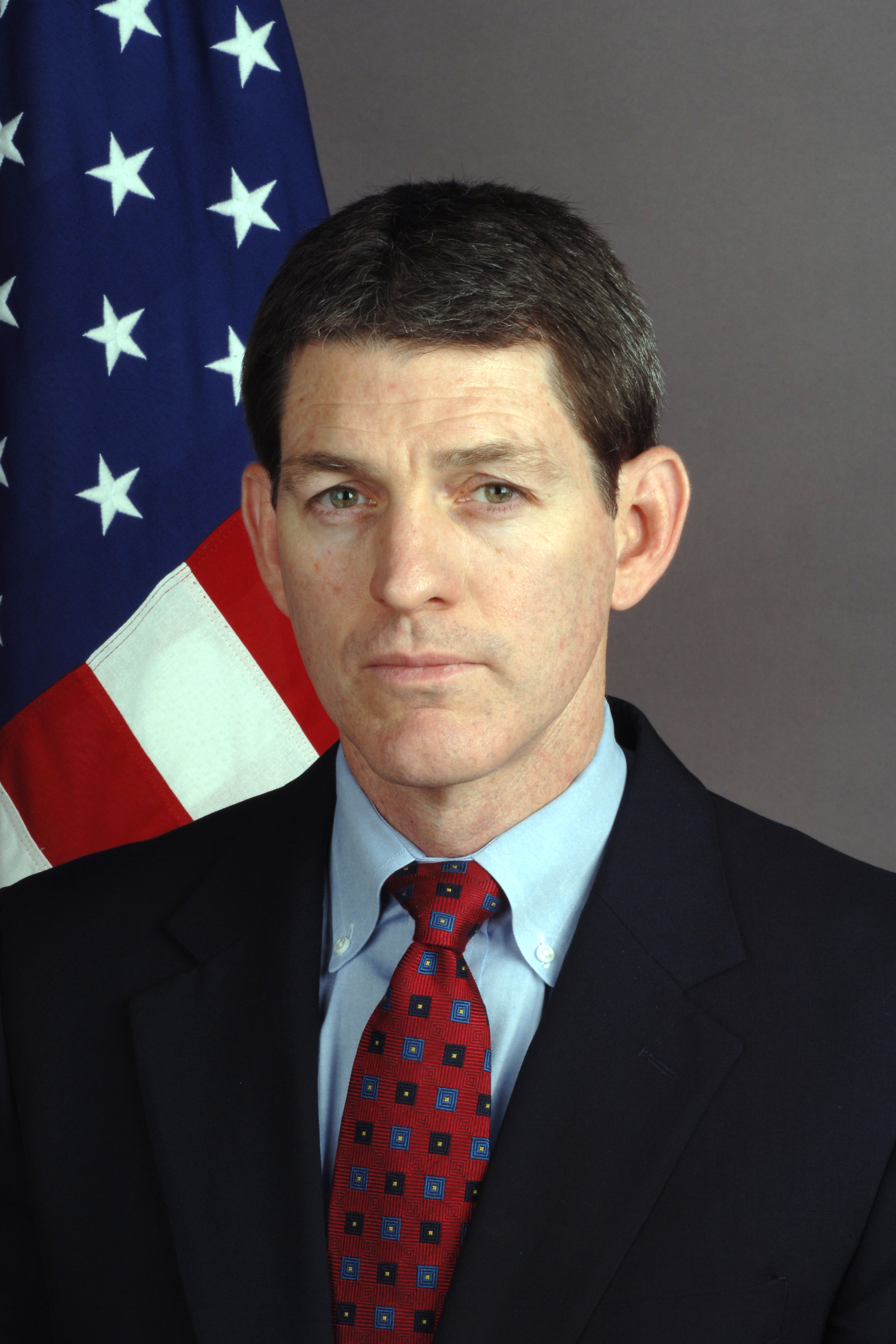
- Hank Crumpton in 2005

14th Coordinator for Counterterrorism
- In office August 2, 2005 – February 2, 2007
- President: George W. Bush
- Preceded by: Cofer Black
- Succeeded by: Dell L. Dailey

Personal details
- Born: Henry Alva Crumpton; 1957 (age 68–69) Athens, Georgia, U.S.
- Education: University of New Mexico (BA); Johns Hopkins SAIS (MA)

Henry "Hank" Alva Crumpton (born 1957) is an American retired Central Intelligence Agency operations officer, who served as deputy director of the Counterterrorism Center and as head of the CIA's National Resources Division, which focuses on operations in the United States. In the early days of the invasion of Afghanistan, Crumpton led CTC Special Operations paramilitary forces in pursuit of the Taliban and al-Qaeda following the September 11 attacks. Crumpton also planned a larger incursion alongside others like Greg Vogle and Chris Wood. He was later appointed by President George W. Bush as Coordinator for Counterterrorism at the Department of State with the rank of Ambassador-at-large on August 2, 2005. He is an author and co-founder, chairman, and CEO of the business intelligence and political risk firm Crumpton Global LLC.

== Early life and education ==
Crumpton grew up in rural Georgia. At age 16 he left home for Alabama, where he worked nights in a carpet factory while studying for his high school diploma during the day. He attended St. John's in Santa Fe, New Mexico, then transferred to the University of New Mexico where he earned a BA in political science in 1978. After graduating he traveled in Asia, the Soviet Union and Western Europe. He has a master's in international public policy from Johns Hopkins University’s School of Advanced International Studies, where he graduated with honors in 2003.

== Counterterrorism career ==
In 1981, at the age of 23, Crumpton became the youngest trainee in his class at the CIA. He began his career at the CIA in the Africa division in Liberia in the 1980s. In 1998-99 he served as deputy chief in the FBI’s International Terrorism Operations Section, while on loan from CIA. In 1998 he investigated the al Qaeda bombings of the US embassies in Kenya and Tanzania and the 2000 attack of the USS Cole off the coast of Yemen. On the day of the 9/11 terrorist attacks, Crumpton had just taken over as CIA station chief in Canberra. He was recalled to become chief of Counterterrorism Center/Special Operations (CTC/SO) in the CIA, in charge of day-to-day running of the war in Afghanistan. Involved with Afghanistan until 2002 when he moved on to calmer assignments. He was the deputy director of the Counter-Terrorism Center from 1999 to 2001, and head of the CIA's National Resources Division, from 2003 to 2005. As head of the National Resources Division he hired future CIA Director Gina Haspel as his deputy. He also was the head of the US covert response in Afghanistan to the September 11, 2001 attack, masterminding the 90-day overthrow of the Taliban. He worked for the CIA for a total of 24 years, served as State Department Coordinator for Counterterrorism with the rank of ambassador-at-large, and retired from government service in 2007.

== Post-government career ==
In 2008 Crumpton founded and is the CEO of the international advisory and business development firm Crumpton Group LLC. He is also the CEO of Crumpton Ventures, an investment group specializing in telecommunications, cyber-security, unmanned aerial systems, and more. In 2020, he and former Hill+Knowlton Strategies Chairman Jack Martin formed Martin+Crumpton Group LLC, an intelligence and public strategy consultancy, serving as co-Chairmen and co-CEOs. In 2022, he renamed the company Crumpton Global LLC.

Crumpton is also involved in TV and film production, creating and leading film company Aardwolf Creative LLC. Together with his business partner, former CIA analyst Rodney Faraon, he was an executive producer for NBC's State of Affairs starring Katherine Heigl.

== Author ==
In 2012, Crumpton published a memoir about his 24 years working for the CIA entitled, The Art of Intelligence: Lessons from a Life in the CIA's Clandestine Service. The book is currently being developed as a movie titled Aperture.

He contributed two chapters to the book Transforming US Intelligence, edited by Jennifer E. Sims and former CIA operations officer Burton Gerber, published in 2005.

== Books featuring Crumpton ==
He is the “Hank” featured in Gary C. Schroen’s book: First In: An Insider’s Account of How the CIA Spearheaded the War on Terror in Afghanistan and Bush at War by Bob Woodward. Crumpton has also been identified as the “Henry” in the September 11 Commission Report.

== Awards and honors ==
- The Intelligence Commendation Medal
- The George HW Bush Award for excellence in counter-terrorism
- The Sherman Kent Award
- The Donovan Award
- The Distinguished Intelligence Medal, the CIA's highest achievement award
