= Bureau of Counterterrorism =

Bureau of the US Department of State

- Seal of the United States Department of State

Bureau overview
- Preceding bureau: Office for Combating Terrorism
- Jurisdiction: Executive branch of the United States
- Employees: Approx. 120 (As of 2012)
- Annual budget: $288.5 million (FY 2011)
- Bureau executive: Gregory LoGerfo, Coordinator for Counterterrorism
- Parent department: U.S. Department of State
- Website: state.gov/ct

The Bureau of Counterterrorism (CT) is a bureau of the United States Department of State. It coordinates all U.S. government efforts to improve counterterrorism cooperation with foreign governments and participates in the development, coordination, and implementation of American counterterrorism policy.

In June 2007, Ambassador-at-Large Dell Dailey was appointed to be the coordinator for Counterterrorism. Under Secretary Hillary Clinton, the coordinator for counterterrorism from 2009 to 2012 was Ambassador-at-Large Daniel Benjamin. He was followed by Tina S. Kaidanow, from 2014 to 2016. The coordinator and special envoy for the Global Coalition to Counter the Islamic State of Iraq and the Levant between 2020 and 2021 was Nathan Sales.

Originally the Office for Combating Terrorism and later the Bureau of Counterterrorism, the bureau's name was expanded in 2016 to include countering violent extremism in its mandate.

== Aims ==
The United States counterterrorism policy has four main aims:

- to make no concessions to terrorists and strike no deals;
- to bring terrorists to justice for their crimes;
- to isolate and apply pressure on states that sponsor terrorism to force them to change their behavior; and
- to bolster the counter-terrorism capabilities of those countries that work with the U.S. and require assistance.

Regarding international terrorism, the U.S. government will make no concessions to individuals or groups holding official or private U.S. citizens hostage. The United States will use every appropriate resource to gain the safe return of American citizens held hostage. At the same time, it is U.S. government policy to deny hostage takers the benefits of ransom, prisoner releases, policy changes, or other acts of concession.

== History ==
An Office for Combatting Terrorism was created in the State Department in 1972 after the Munich Olympics terrorist attack. Its name and legal authorization has changed a few times, and it was renamed the Bureau of Counterterrorism in 2012.

In reaction to the State Department's 2004 proposal to omit terrorism figures from its report to Congress, Larry C. Johnson stated that the State Department was put in charge of coordinating counterterrorism functions across government agencies by a presidential directive in 1986. Johnson wrote:

I believe that part of the reason the statistics became an issue again this year is because of the failure to keep the position of the Coordinator for Counter Terrorism filled with a competent Presidential appointee. That slot has been vacant now for almost six months.

While the conventional wisdom is that State Department’s role in combating terrorism consists of sending stern diplomatic notes to terrorists, it is an unfair and inaccurate perception. State Department’s role as the lead for coordinating international terrorism emerged in the mid-1980s in the wake of devastating attacks in Lebanon.

A National Security Decision Directive signed by President Ronald Reagan in early 1986 gave State the responsibility of coordinating international terrorism policy. This was in response to an interagency fight that broke out during an effort to apprehend the terrorists responsible for the hijacking of the Achille Lauro cruise ship. While flying over Italy in late 1985 in pursuit of Abu Abbas, a State Department official and a CIA officer argued heatedly over who was in charge of the mission.

Recognizing the need for a clear chain of command the Department of State was put in charge of coordinating the efforts of CIA, DOD, and FBI to track and deal with terrorism. The first man put in charge of this effort was L. Paul (Jerry) Bremer.

The Department of State reorganized again in January 2012, elevating the former Office for the Coordinator for Counterterrorism to a bureau after the Quadrennial Diplomacy and Development Review

In early 2016, the Obama administration announced an overhaul in the bureau's programs in response to the growing threat of the Islamic State of Iraq and the Levant. Among the changes planned was the reorganization of the bureau into the Bureau of Counterterrorism and Countering Violent Extremism. As of September 2025, the bureau moved under the purview of the under secretary of state for arms control and international security.

== See also ==
- Coordinator for Counterterrorism
