= Gregory LoGerfo =

American diplomat

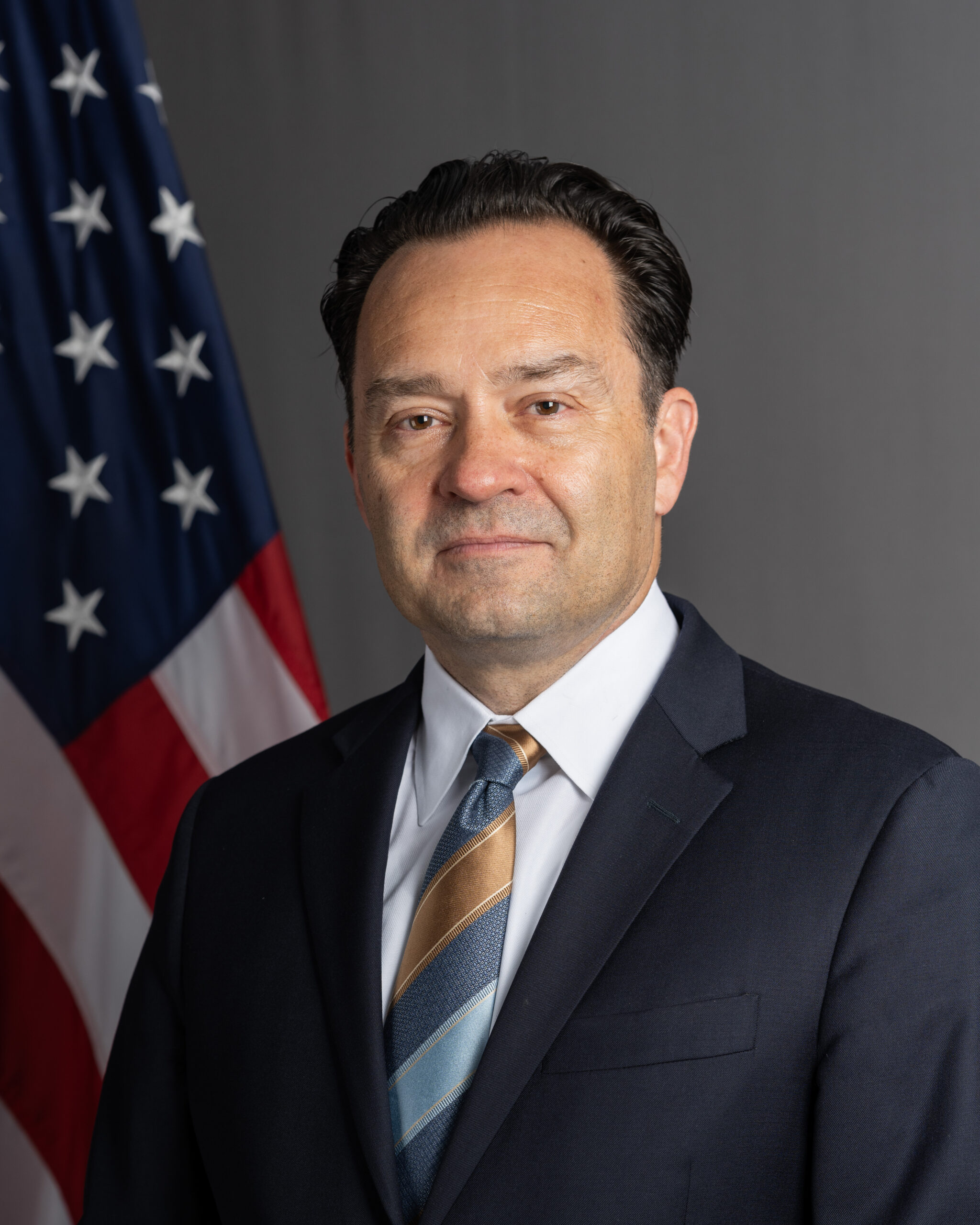
- Official portrait, 2026

Coordinator for Counterterrorism
- Incumbent
- Assumed office May 21, 2026
- President: Donald Trump
- Preceded by: Elizabeth H. Richard
- Acting; January 20, 2025 – October 29, 2025
- President: Donald Trump
- Preceded by: Elizabeth H. Richard
- Succeeded by: Monica Ager Jacobsen (acting)

Principal Deputy Assistant Secretary of the Bureau of Near Eastern Affairs
- Acting; December 2025 – May 2026
- Preceded by: Henry T. Wooster
- Succeeded by: Vacant

Principal Deputy Coordinator of the Bureau of Counterterrorism
- In office June 2024 – January 2025
- Preceded by: Unknown
- Succeeded by: Monica Ager Jacobsen (acting)

Personal details
- Children: 2
- Education: University of Miami (B); College of William & Mary (JD)
- Awards: Distinguished Honor Award; James A. Baker Award for Outstanding Deputy Chief of Mission; Presidential Rank Meritorious Service Award

Gregory LoGerfo is an American diplomat who has served as the coordinator for counterterrorism since 2026. LoGerfo previously served as principal deputy coordinator of the Bureau of Counterterrorism from June 2024 to January 2025, acting coordinator for counterterrorism from January to October 2025, and acting principal deputy coordinator of the Bureau of Near Eastern Affairs from December 2025 to May 2026. LoGerfo was the deputy chief of mission at the United States embassy in Tunis from 2019 to 2021, and later, at the United States embassy in Baghdad from 2021 to 2022.

== Early life and education ==
Gregory LoGerfo was raised in Belmont, Massachusetts, the son of Frank LoGerfo and Judith Molnar LoGerfo. He attended Boston College High School before attaining a bachelor's degree from the University of Miami and a law degree from the College of William & Mary.

== Career ==
LoGerfo was a political officer in Amman, Jordan, from 2001 to 2002. The following year, LoGerfo served in the Department of State's Office of Israel and Palestinian Affairs as senior economic officer, a position he held until 2005. In 2006, LoGerfo worked for the National Security Council, and from 2007 to 2010, he was a political officer in Cairo, Egypt. He served as deputy political counselor at the United States embassy in Baghdad from 2010 to 2011.

From 2012 to 2015, LoGerfo served as counselor for political and economic affairs at the United States embassy in The Hague. LoGerfo was then the director for Maghreb Affairs at the Bureau of Near Eastern Affairs from 2015 to 2017.

LoGerfo later served as chief of staff to deputy secretary of state John Sullivan until 2019, when he became the deputy chief of mission at the United States embassy in Tunis, a position he held for two years. From 2021 to 2022, LoGerfo was the deputy chief of mission at the United States embassy in Baghdad.

From June 2024 to January 2025, LoGerfo served as the principal deputy coordinator of the Bureau of Counterterrorism; he was then the acting coordinator for counterterrorism from January to October 2025. From December 2025 to May 2026, LoGerfo was the principal deputy coordinator of the Bureau of Near Eastern Affairs.

On October 21, 2025, the United States Senate received a nomination for LoGerfo to serve as the coordinator for counterterrorism. On May 18, 2026, his nomination was confirmed by the Senate in a 46–43 vote. He assumed office three days later.

== Personal life ==
LoGerfo is married and has two sons. He is multilingual, speaking English as well as Arabic and Dutch.

== Awards ==
- Distinguished Honor Award (2019)
- James A. Baker Award for Outstanding Deputy Chief of Mission (2021)
- Presidential Rank Meritorious Service Award (2023)

Government offices
Preceded by Elizabeth H. Richard	Coordinator for Counterterrorism; 2026–present	Incumbent
