= Dorothy Shea =

American diplomat

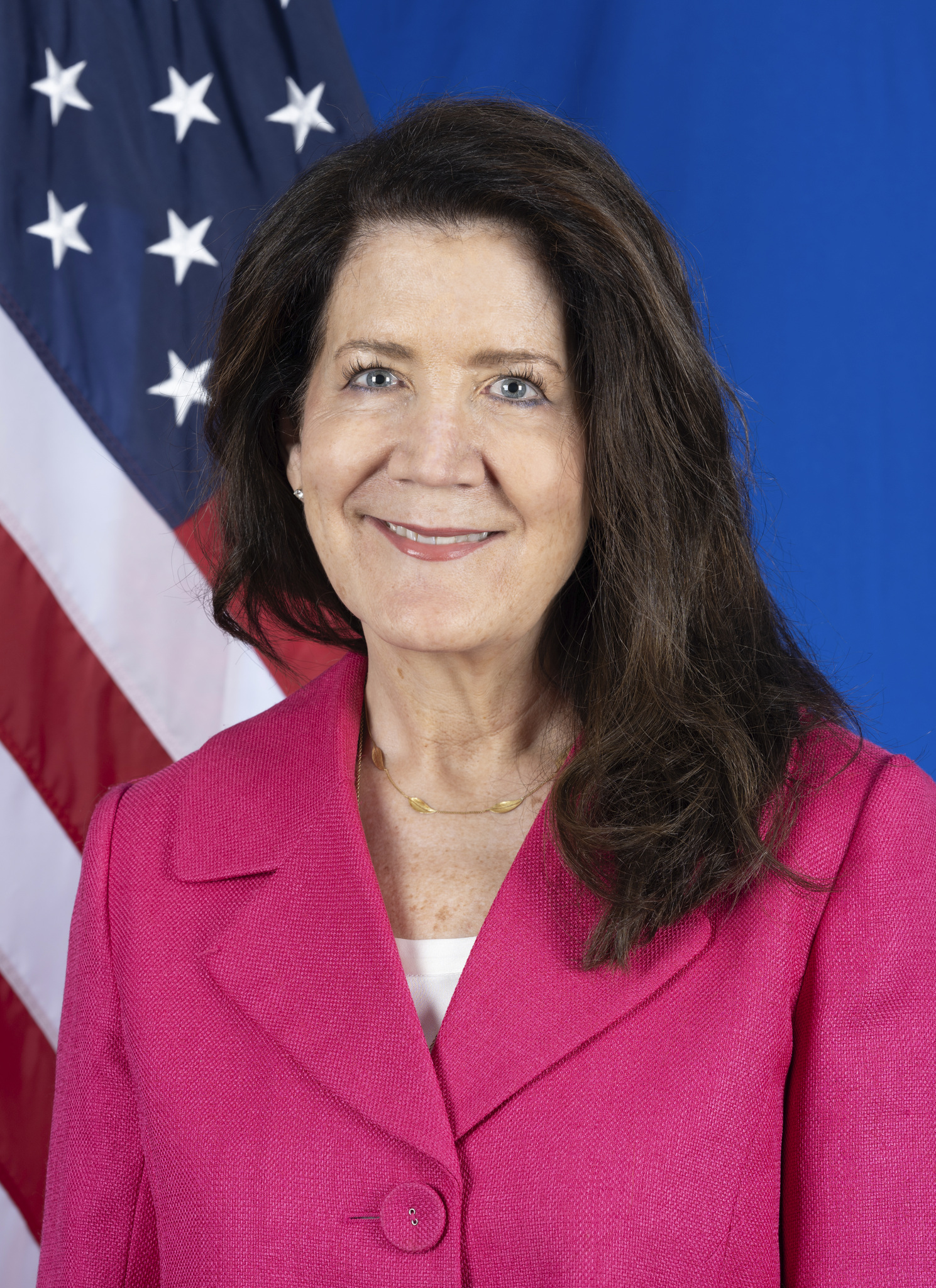
- Official portrait, 2024

United States Chargé d'Affaires to the United Nations
- In office January 20, 2025 – September 21, 2025
- President: Donald Trump
- Preceded by: Linda Thomas-Greenfield
- Succeeded by: Mike Waltz

United States Deputy Ambassador to the United Nations
- In office August 16, 2024 – November 22, 2025
- President: Joe Biden; Donald Trump
- Preceded by: Richard M. Mills Jr.
- Succeeded by: Tammy Bruce

United States Ambassador to Lebanon
- In office March 11, 2020 – December 28, 2023
- President: Donald Trump; Joe Biden
- Preceded by: Elizabeth H. Richard
- Succeeded by: Lisa A. Johnson

Personal details
- Born: Dorothy Camille Shea
- Education: University of Virginia (BA); Georgetown University (MS); National War College (MS)

Dorothy Camille Shea is an American retired career diplomat. In January 2025, she was appointed United States Chargé d'Affaires to the United Nations after serving as the deputy ambassador in 2024. Shea was the United States ambassador to Lebanon from 2020 to 2023. On December 7, 2022, she received the Distinguished Presidential Rank Award for sustained extraordinary accomplishment. On January 3, 2023, U.S. President Joe Biden announced his intention to nominate her as deputy representative of the United States of America to the United Nations, with the rank and status of ambassador extraordinary and plenipotentiary, and deputy representative of the United States of America in the Security Council of the United Nations as well as representative of the United States of America to the sessions of the General Assembly of the United Nations.

On January 20, 2025, Shea assumed the office of United States Chargé d'Affaires to the United Nations after being named to the office by President Donald Trump.

== Education ==
Shea earned a bachelor of arts from the University of Virginia, a master of science from Georgetown University, and a master of science from the National War College.

== Career ==
She is a career member of the Senior Foreign Service, class of Minister-Counselor. She had served as deputy principal officer at the United States Consulate General in Jerusalem, as director of the Office of Assistance for Asia and the Near East in the Bureau of Population, Refugees, and Migration, and as a Pearson fellow with the Senate Foreign Relations Committee. She was also the political/economic counselor at the United States Embassy in Tunis, Tunisia, a political officer at the United States Embassy in Tel Aviv, Israel, a director for democracy and human rights at the National Security Council, and a special assistant to the special envoy for war crimes Issues in the United States Department of State. Prior to her appointment as ambassador, she served as deputy chief of mission of the U.S. Embassy in Cairo, Egypt, from 2017 to 2020.

=== United States ambassador to Lebanon ===
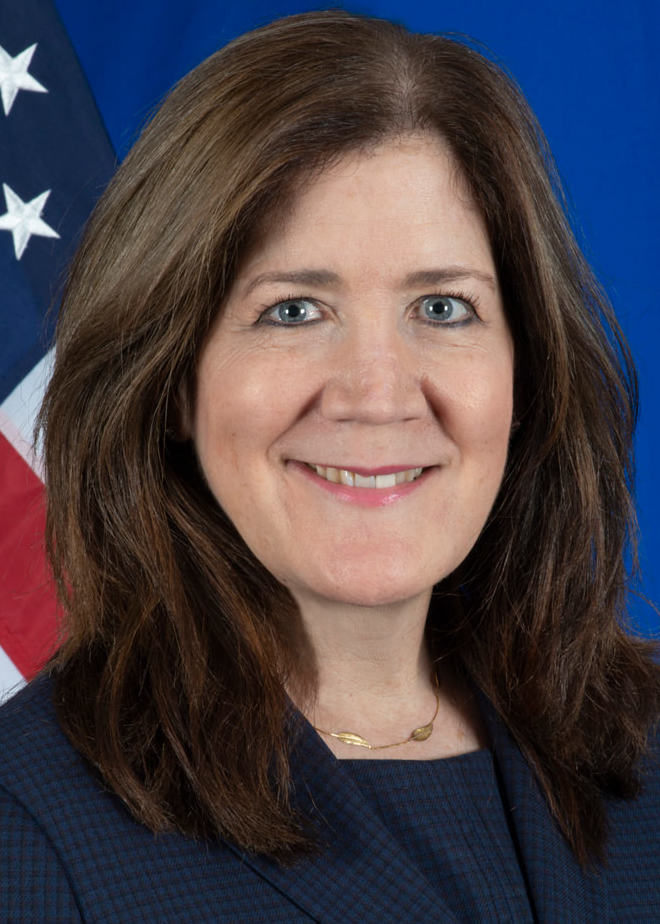
Official portrait as Ambassador to Lebanon, 2020

On October 11, 2019, President Donald Trump announced his intent to nominate Shea to be the next United States ambassador to Lebanon. On October 17, 2019, her nomination was sent to the United States Senate. On December 17, 2019, a hearing was held on her nomination before the Senate Foreign Relations Committee. On January 15, 2020, her nomination was reported out of committee. On February 11, 2020, her nomination was unanimously confirmed by voice vote. She presented her credentials to President Michel Aoun on March 11, 2020.

==== Media ban ====
Within a few months after assuming her ambassadorship in Lebanon, Shea vocally criticized Hezbollah, a militant group and political organization in Lebanon which is labelled a terrorist organization by the United States and several other countries. Shea accused Hezbollah of interfering in attempts to improve Lebanon's devastated economy and of draining billions of dollars in funds from the Lebanese government. She also criticized a speech by Hezbollah's leader Hassan Nasrallah blaming the United States for the economic crisis. In June 2020, following her remarks, Lebanese jurist Mohammad Mazeh accused her of violating the Vienna Convention on Diplomatic Relations. He said that her comments interfered in Lebanon's internal affairs, "offended many Lebanese," and increased sectarian tensions. Mazeh passed an order preventing her from making any public statement, as well as forbidding any local or foreign media outlet working in Lebanon from conducting interviews with her or on pain of a $200,000 fine. However, the decision was not implemented, and Mazeh was called to appear before the Judicial Inspection Board. He refused and submitted his resignation. Justice Minister Marie-Claude Najm accepted it on 14 July.

=== Deputy UN Representative ===
On January 3, 2023, President Joe Biden nominated Shea to be deputy representative of the United States of America to the United Nations, with the rank and status of ambassador extraordinary and plenipotentiary, and deputy representative of the United States of America in the Security Council of the United Nations as well as representative of the United States of America to the sessions of the General Assembly of the United Nations. Hearings on her nomination were held before the Senate Foreign Relations Committee on June 21, 2023. Her nomination was favorably reported by the committee on July 13, 2023.

On August 1, 2024, the Senate voted 59–34 to confirm Shea's nomination.

In February 2025, at the direction of the Trump administration, she urged the United Nations Security Council to support a resolution concerning the war in Ukraine, which did not call Russia the aggressor in the Russian invasion of Ukraine or acknowledge Ukraine’s territorial integrity. It was the first resolution passed in three years on the subject.

== Personal life ==
Shea speaks French and Arabic.

== See also ==
- List of ambassadors of the United States

Diplomatic posts
Preceded by Elizabeth H. Richard	United States Ambassador to Lebanon; 2020–2023	Succeeded by Lisa A. Johnson
Preceded by Richard M. Mills Jr.	United States Deputy Ambassador to the United Nations; 2024–2025	Succeeded by Tammy Bruce
Preceded by Linda Thomas-Greenfield	United States Chargé d'affaires to the United Nations; 2025	Succeeded by Mike Waltz
