= Cofer Black =

US intelligence officer and diplomat (born 1950)

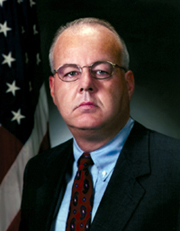

13th Coordinator for Counterterrorism
- In office November 26, 2002 – November 15, 2004
- President: George W. Bush
- Preceded by: Frank Taylor
- Succeeded by: Henry A. Crumpton

Personal details
- Born: Joseph Cofer Black; 1950 (age 75–76) Stamford, Connecticut, U.S.
- Party: Independent
- Education: University of Southern California (BA, MA)
- Awards: National Intelligence Distinguished Service Medal

Joseph Cofer Black (born 1950) is an American former CIA officer who served as director of the Counterterrorism Center in the years surrounding the September 11th attacks, and was later appointed Ambassador-at-Large and Coordinator for Counterterrorism at the State Department by President George W. Bush, serving until his resignation in 2004. Prior to his roles combatting terrorism, Black served across the globe in a variety of roles with the Directorate of Operations at the CIA.

== Early life ==
A native of Ridgefield, Connecticut, Black completed his B.A. at the University of Southern California in 1973. Black’s father had been a pilot for Pan Am, and as a young man he was able to travel extensively by boarding his father’s flights. A year after finishing his undergraduate degree, he earned a master's degree in international relations, also at USC. He then was accepted to a doctoral program at USC, but left in 1975 to join the CIA.

== CIA career up to 1999 ==
At the CIA, Black trained for the clandestine service and volunteered for Africa based on his knowledge of the region from childhood travels with his father across the continent. Initially, he worked as a case officer in Lusaka, Zambia, during the Rhodesian Bush War. He then transferred to Somalia, where he served for two years during the conflict between Ethiopians and Somalis. He worked in South Africa during the National Party government's war against guerrilla movements opposing the apartheid system. While assigned to Kinshasa, Zaire, Black was involved in the Reagan Administration's covert action program to arm anti-communist guerrillas in neighboring Angola.

In 1993, Black transferred from London to Khartoum, Sudan, where he served as CIA station chief until 1995. This was at a low point in U.S.-Sudanese relations, due to the latter's sponsorship of terrorism and the harboring of Carlos the Jackal and al-Qaeda founder Osama bin Laden. Black oversaw the collection of human intelligence (HUMINT) on terrorist cells and support structures; toward the end of his tenure, he was targeted by Al Qaeda for assassination (see Woodward, Bush at War, p. 9).

In 1995, Black was named the Task Force Chief in the Near East and South Asia Division. From June 1998 through June 1999, he served as the Deputy Chief of the Latin America Division.

== Director of CTC (1999–2002) ==
In June 1999 Director of Central Intelligence George Tenet named Black director of the CIA's Counterterrorist Center (CTC). In this capacity, Black served as the CIA Director's Special Assistant for Counterterrorism as well as the National Intelligence Officer for Counterterrorism. Black's promotion was a part of Tenet's "grand plan" for dealing with Al Qaeda. Black was the operational chief in charge of this effort. Tenet also put "Richard," one of his own assistants, in charge of the CTC's bin Laden tracking unit. Black still headed the CTC at the time of the September 11, 2001 attacks on the World Trade Center.

=== Al-Qaeda strategy, 1999–2001 ===
In December 1998, CIA chief Tenet "declared war" on Osama bin Laden. Early in 1999 Tenet "ordered the CTC to begin a 'baseline' review of the CIA's operational strategy against bin Laden." In the spring, he "demanded 'a new, comprehensive plan of attack' against bin Laden and his allies."

The CTC had produced a "comprehensive plan of attack" against bin Laden and previewed the new strategy to senior CIA management by the end of July 1999. By mid-September, it had been briefed to CIA operational level personnel, the NSA, the FBI, and other partners. The strategy was referred to as "the Plan."

... [Cofer] Black and his new bin Laden unit wanted to "project" into Afghanistan, to "penetrate" bin Laden's sanctuaries. They described their plan as military officers might. They sought to surround Afghanistan with secure covert bases for CIA operations—as many bases as they could arrange. Then they would mount operations from each of the platforms, trying to move inside Afghanistan and as close to bin Laden as they could to recruit agents and to attempt capture operations. Black wanted recruitments and he wanted to develop commando or paramilitary strike teams made up of officers and men who could "blend" into the region's Muslim populations.

Parallel with these developments, in November–December 1999, Mohamed Atta, Marwan al-Shehhi, Ziad Jarrah, and Nawaf al-Hazmi visited Afghanistan, where they were selected for the "planes operation" that was to become known as 9/11. Working with a Malaysian security unit, the CIA watched al-Hazmi and his companion Khalid al-Mihdhar as they attended a January 2000 Al Qaeda conference in Kuala Lumpur, later determined to be where decisions about the "planes operation" were made.

According to an internal CIA report on the performance of the agency prior to the 9/11 attacks, Black was criticized for not informing the FBI that al-Hazmi and al-Mihdhar had subsequently entered the United States. In addition, the 9/11 Commission found that while Black testified before Congress's Joint Inquiry into 9/11 that the FBI had access to information on the two hijackers, the 9/11 Commission found no such evidence of this.

The CIA increasingly concentrated its resources on counter-terrorism, so that resources for this particular activity increased sharply. Some of the Plan's more modest aspirations were translated into action. Intelligence collection efforts on bin Laden and Al Qaeda increased significantly from 1999. "By 9/11," said Tenet, "a map would show that these collection programs and human [reporting] networks were in place in such numbers as to nearly cover Afghanistan."

During the summer of 2001, Tenet, Black, and one of Black's top assistants—"Rich B" (i.e. "Richard")—were active in conveying the dangers of Al Qaeda to the new Bush administration. At a meeting with National Security Adviser Condoleezza Rice and others on July 10, 2001, "Rich" predicted a "spectacular" terrorist attack against US interests "in the coming weeks or months" ... "Multiple and simultaneous attacks are possible." After the meeting, "Rich and Cofer congratulated each other," feeling that at last the CIA had gotten the full attention of the administration. At an internal CIA update in late July, "Rich" dramatically predicted, "They're coming here!" (i.e. the United States).

One of the ways by which CIA/CTC surveilled Osama bin Laden in his Afghan base was the Predator reconnaissance drone. A joint CIA-Air Force program of flights in autumn 2000 (dubbed "Afghan Eyes") produced probable sightings of the Al Qaeda leader. Black became a "vocal advocate" of arming the aircraft with missiles to target bin Laden and other Al Qaeda leaders. Throughout 2001, Black and "Richard" continued to press for Predators armed with adapted Hellfire anti-tank missiles. Legal and technical issues delayed the program. Black urged Tenet to promote the matter at the long-awaited Cabinet-level Principals Committee meeting on terrorism of September 4, 2001. The CIA chief did so. The CIA was authorized to "deploy the system with weapons-capable aircraft."

=== September 11, 2001 ===
After the attacks on the World Trade Center and the Pentagon, some CTC staff refused an order to evacuate the CIA headquarters at Langley. This included the shift of the Global Response Center on the exposed sixth floor, which Black would eventually argue had "a key function in a crisis like this." CIA director Tenet finally accepted that Black wouldn't leave, and that their lives would be put at risk.

The CTC obtained passenger lists from the planes that had been turned into weapons that morning, noting the presence of Khalid al-Mihdhar and Nawaf al-Hazmi. This was the first "absolute proof" that the attacks were an Al Qaeda plot. The CTC had first come across the names in connection with potential terrorist activity in the winter of 1999–2000 (see above).

Despite his well-known statement "after 9/11 the gloves come off", Black was cautious about legal authorizations. He compared vague hints dropped by the president, of a nature that might not carry immunity, to Henry II's indirect order: "Who will rid me of this meddlesome priest?".

=== Post 9/11: Global War on Terror ===
On September 13, 2001, Black briefed President George W. Bush in the White House Situation Room and outlined a CIA-led campaign in Afghanistan in which small teams of CIA officers and Green Berets would work with the Northern Alliance to topple the Taliban government and expel Al Qaeda. Black told Bush: "When we're through with them, they will have flies walking across their eyeballs." Black told Bush that the CIA's planning efforts had put them in a better position to respond after the attacks. Tenet later said,

How could [an intelligence] community without a strategic plan tell the president of the United States just four days after 9/11 how to attack the Afghan sanctuary and operate against al-Qa'ida in ninety-two countries around the world?

A "war council" (i.e. a restricted group of the National Security Council) chaired by President Bush at Camp David was convened on September 15, 2001. Black was present. Tenet proposed first to send CIA teams into Afghanistan to collect intelligence and mount covert operations. The teams would act jointly with military Special Operations units. President Bush later praised this proposal, saying it had been "a turning point in his thinking."

Black and Armitage then flew to Moscow to seek help from Russian diplomatic and intelligence officers, as Afghanistan was in their sphere of influence. The Russians indicated their willingness to help and would not obstruct CIA activities. They warned Black about guerilla fighters being a major problem for the Russian army in Afghanistan, and provided a team to the CIA to assist with extensive on-the-ground intelligence, especially about topography and caves.

The CIA geared up to take the lead in the attack on Al Qaeda and the Taliban in Afghanistan. The Northern Afghanistan Liaison Team, led by Gary Schroen, entered the country on September 26, 2001. A new branch was added to the CTC—CTC Special Operations, or CTC/SO. Hank Crumpton, the former head of CTC operations, was recalled to head it. Black told him, "Your mission is to find al-Qa'ida, engage it, and destroy it."

Testifying at the Congressional Joint Inquiry into the September 11 attacks in 2002, Black declined the offer of anonymity because "I want to look the American people in the eye."

During the "war on terror" Black is said to have played a "leading role in many of the [CIA]'s more controversial programs, including the rendition/kidnapping and torture /interrogation of al-Qaeda suspects and the detention of some of them in secret prisons [outside the USA]." A small group of officials within the CIA's Counter-terrorism Center was put in charge of supporting the prisons and managing the interrogations. By some accounts, Abu Zubaydah was taken into custody in March 2002 in Pakistan, and after initial U.S. interrogation and treatment for gunshot wounds, sent to a secret CIA torture center in Thailand, where he was waterboarded in April or May 2002.

== Coordinator for Counter-terrorism (2002–2004) ==
Black was appointed as the US Department of State's Ambassador-at-Large for counter-terrorism in late 2002. He held this position until November 2004.

== Private sector work (2005–present) ==
=== Blackwater ===
From 2005 to 2008, Black was Vice Chairman of Blackwater USA (later renamed Blackwater Worldwide, then Xe, then Academi, and finally Constellis Holdings after a 2014 merger with Triple Canopy), a US-based private military contractor which was "the biggest of the State Department's three private security contractors".

In March 2006, Black allegedly suggested at an international conference in Amman, Jordan, that Blackwater USA was ready to move towards providing security professionals up to brigade size for humanitarian efforts and low intensity conflicts. Black denies the allegation. Critics have suggested this may be going too far in putting political decisions in the hands of privately owned corporations. The company denies this was ever said.

Black resigned in 2008 reportedly after learning of illegal payments to Iraqi officials.

=== Blackbird Technologies & Total Intelligence Solutions ===
From 2009 to 2014, Black joined Blackbird Technologies as Vice President for Global Operations. Blackbird was a technology contractor to intelligence, defense and corporate clients, before being acquired by Raytheon in 2014. Black later served as chairman of Total Intelligence Solutions (Total Intel), a private intelligence gathering group. This company was created in February 2007 by the Prince Group, the holding company that owns Blackwater. Total Intel was formed by the merger of The Black Group LLC (also led by Black), Terrorism Research Center, Inc., and Technical Defense. As of 2021, Total Intel has been absorbed by OODA group, a business intelligence and crisis response consulting group. Black appears on the firm's list of consultants.

=== Mitt Romney presidential campaigns ===
On April 26, 2007, Black was chosen by Mitt Romney to head a campaign counter-terrorism policy advisory group during the Republican's 2008 U.S. presidential campaign.

In October 2011, Black was chosen by Romney to serve as "Special Adviser" on all foreign policy issues during his 2012 presidential campaign.

=== Burisma ===
In February 2017, the Ukrainian oil and gas corporation Burisma announced the addition of Black to the company's board of directors, leading the company's security and strategic development efforts.

In the wake of the Hunter Biden email controversy, a report from The Wall Street Journal associated Black's role at the firm with a group of "well-connected operatives in Washington to help persuade Ukrainian prosecutors to drop criminal cases against it."

During the 2020 presidential election, the Trump campaign shared an article from a conservative opinion outlet advancing a conspiracy theory connecting Black's work with Burisma and his connection to Mitt Romney's presidential campaigns. The campaign used the article to attempt to tie Romney to the growing Hunter Biden email controversy and discredit his vote to convict Trump during his first impeachment trial as a product of corrupt collusion with the Bidens. Romney associates contradicted the claims.

=== Mueller investigation ===
Black's name appears in volume five of the 2020 Senate Intelligence Committee report on Russian interference in the 2016 presidential elections produced following the investigation by special prosecutor Robert Mueller. Joel Zamel, executive at Psy-Group, an Israeli private intelligence agency specializing in honey traps and perception manipulation campaigns, testified that apart from their pitch to the Trump campaign, the firm had proposed projects to three other clients: Russian oligarchs Oleg Deripaska and Dmitri Rybolovlev, and Blackwater founder Erik Prince, whom Black had introduced to Zamel in 2016.

=== Other roles ===
In January 2016 Black became an independent director of publicly traded biotechnology company Northwest Biotherapeutics (NWBO), a Maryland-based development-stage biopharmaceutical company developing cancer immunotherapies.

== Awards ==
In addition to numerous performance awards and citations, Ambassador Black received the Distinguished Intelligence Medal; the CIAs highest achievement award, the Distinguished Career Intelligence Medal, the George HW Bush Award for Excellence in Counterterrorism, the Donavan award, and the Exceptional Collector Award.

== See also ==
- Bin Laden Issue Station

Diplomatic posts
Preceded by Frank Taylor	Coordinator for Counterterrorism; 2002–2004	Succeeded by Henry Crumpton
