= Embassy of Tunisia, Washington, D.C. =

Diplomatic mission to the United States

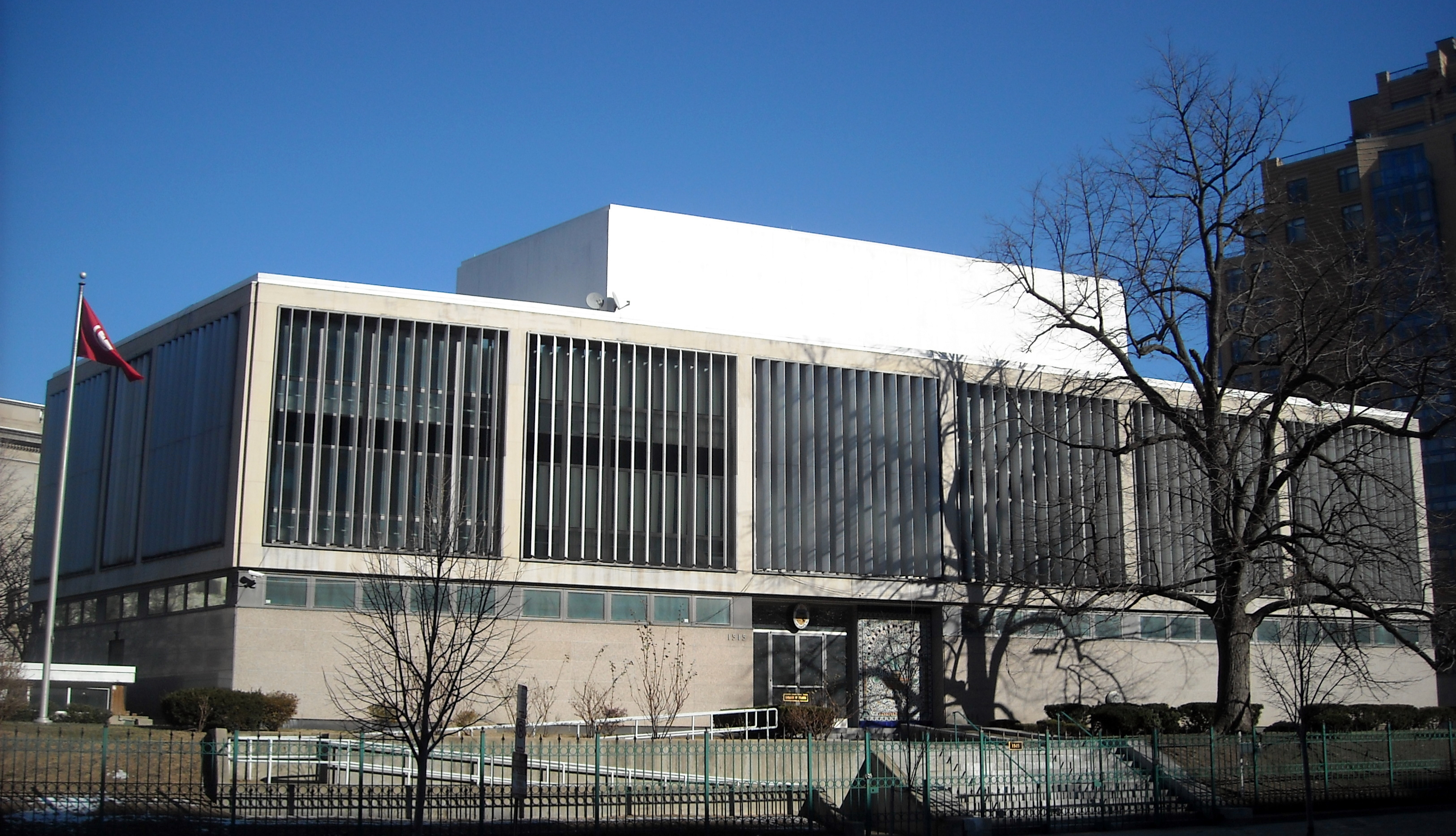
- Location: Washington, D.C.
- Address: 1515 Massachusetts Avenue N.W.
- Coordinates: 38°54′24.35″N 77°2′6.52″W
- Ambassador: Hanene Tajouri Bessassi
- Website: tunisianembassy.org

The Embassy of Tunisia in Washington, D.C. is the diplomatic mission of the Tunisian Republic to the United States. It is located at 1515 Massachusetts Avenue NW in Washington, D.C., on the east side of Scott Circle and on the eastern edge of Embassy Row. The Ambassador is Hanene Tajouri Bessassi.

In 2009, U.S. Secretary of State Hillary Clinton participated in an iftar with the Ambassador of Tunisia. It occurred at the U.S. Department of State in Washington, D.C. on September 15, 2009 during the iftar celebration held annually by the department at the time of Ramadan. Speaking in her address, Clinton stressed the commitment of the Obama administration towards religious liberty and building up relations between the U.S. and Muslim communities. She also underlined the significance of dialogue and cooperation between people of different religions.

== See also ==
- Tunisia–United States relations
- Embassy of the United States, Tunis
