= Mohammad Mazeh =

Lebanese jurist and judge

- محمد مازح

Urgent Matters Judge of Tyre
- In office 2017 – 14 July 2020

Mohammad Mazeh (Arabic: محمد مازح) is a Lebanese jurist who served as the urgent matters judge of Tyre until 2020. He issued an order preventing media outlets from conducting interviews with American ambassador Dorothy Shea, accusing her of interference in Lebanon's internal affairs. Following this act, he was accused of acting under Hezbollah control. On 30 June 2020, he resigned from office in protest after he was called to appear before the Judicial Inspection Board. Justice Minister Marie-Claude Najm accepted his resignation on 14 July 2020.
