= Elizabeth H. Richard =

American diplomat

Elizabeth Richard
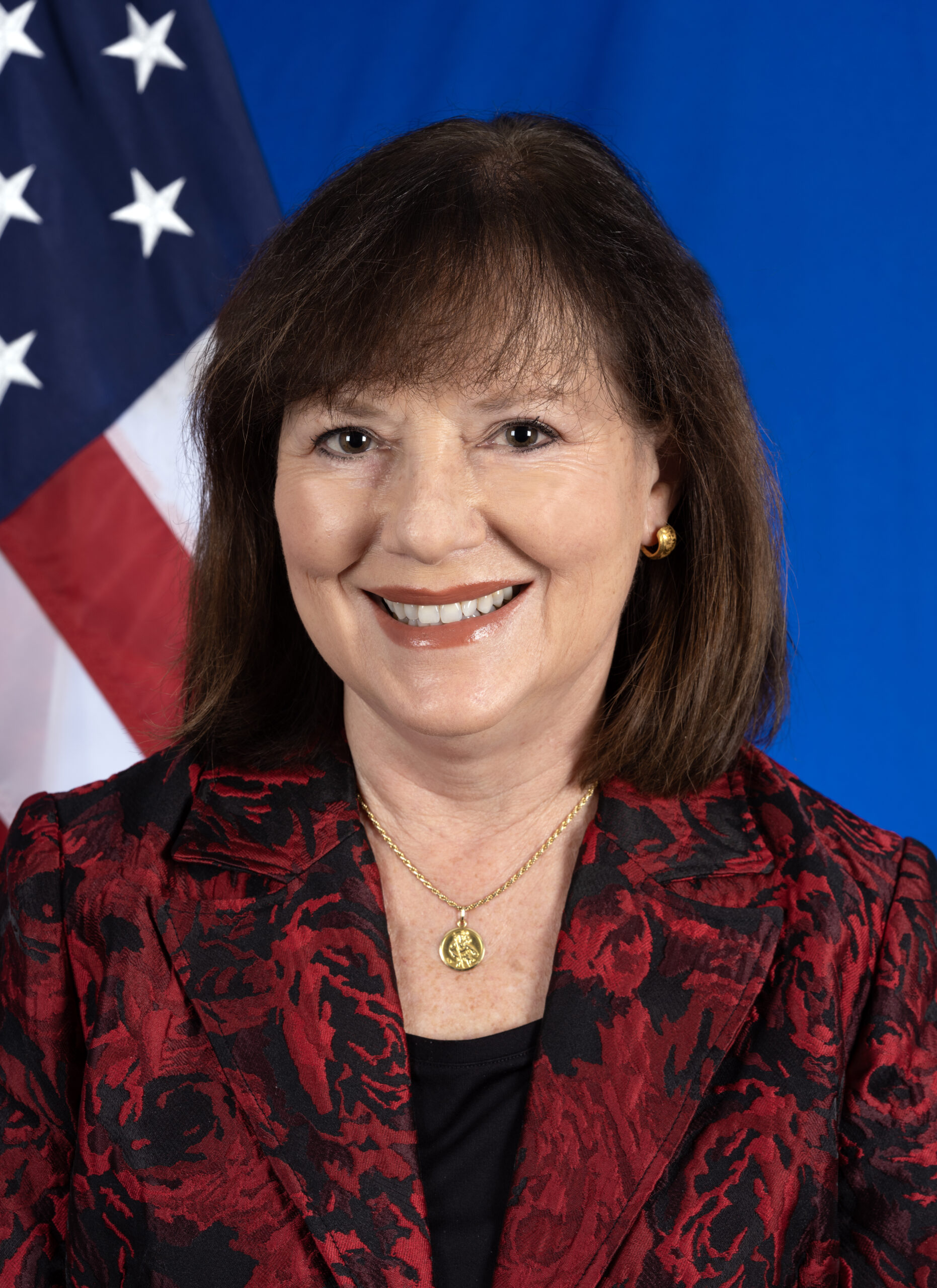

19th Coordinator for Counterterrorism
- In office December 29, 2023 – January 20, 2025
- President: Joe Biden
- Preceded by: Nathan A. Sales
- Succeeded by: Gregory LoGerfo

United States Ambassador to Lebanon
- In office May 17, 2016 – February 14, 2020
- President: Barack Obama; Donald Trump
- Preceded by: David Hale
- Succeeded by: Dorothy Shea

Personal details
- Education: Southern Methodist University (BA, JD); National War College (MS)

Elizabeth Holzhall Richard is an American diplomat who had served as United States ambassador to Lebanon from 2016 to 2020. She had served as coordinator for counterterrorism.

== Early life and education ==
Richard is the daughter of Vern F. Holzhall and Mary V. Holzhall. She earned a Bachelor of Arts degree from Southern Methodist University, a Juris Doctor from the Dedman School of Law, and a Master of Science from the National War College.

== Career ==
Richard joined the Foreign Service in 1986. Her early career included assignments in Ecuador, Italy, Singapore, and Thailand. From 2002 to 2003 she was special assistant to the under secretary of state for political affairs. She then served two years as deputy to the U.S. ambassador at-large for war crimes issues. In 2005 she became deputy director of the Office of Asia, Africa, and Europe in the Bureau of International Narcotics and Law Enforcement and a year later became director for Counter-Narcotics, Law Enforcement, and Rule of Law Programs in Kabul, Afghanistan. From 2008 to 2010 she served in Islamabad, Pakistan and from 2010 to 2013 she was deputy chief of mission in Yemen.

When selected by President Barack Obama for an ambassador role, Richard was deputy assistant secretary in the Bureau of Near Eastern Affairs, a role she had held since 2013. She was confirmed by the Senate on May 17, 2016.

=== Coordinator for Counterterrorism ===
Richard was nominated to serve as coordinator for counterterrorism in the Biden administration. Hearings on her nomination were held before the Senate Foreign Relations Committee on May 10, 2022. The committee favorably reported her nomination to the Senate floor on June 9, 2022. On January 3, 2023, her nomination was returned to the president under Rule XXXI, Paragraph 6 of the United States Senate. She was renominated the same day. On April 27, 2023, her nomination was reported out of committee. On December 19, 2023, the Senate confirmed her nomination by a 49–15 vote. She was sworn in December 29, 2023.

== Personal life ==
Richard is the widow of Christopher John Richard. She speaks Italian, Spanish, and French.

Diplomatic posts
Preceded by Richard Jones; Charge d'affaires	United States Ambassador to Lebanon; 2016–2020	Succeeded by Dorothy Shea
Government offices
Preceded by Nathan A. Sales	Coordinator for Counterterrorism; 2023–2025	Succeeded by Gregory LoGerfo
