= Rodney Faraon =

Former CIA intelligence officer

Rodney Faraon is a former CIA senior intelligence officer.

== Biography ==
Faraon is also a partner and Chief Creative Officer at Crumpton Global LLC, a business intelligence, political risk, and public strategy firm, founded by Hank Crumpton. He was a briefer and speechwriter for the Director of Central Intelligence, George J. Tenet during both the President Bill Clinton and President George W. Bush administrations and was awarded the Director's Medal for his work. He is also the President of Aardwolf Creative, a company that produces CIA-themed shows and movies. He was the executive producer of and inspiration for State of Affairs, a 13-episode NBC series about a CIA analyst starring Katherine Heigl and Alfre Woodard. As of 2019, Faraon became a partner with private equity firm Crumpton Ventures.

In July 2021, Faraon appeared as a contestant on the inaugural season of BravoTV show "Top Chef Amateurs."

== Early life and education ==
Faraon was born in Kansas City, KS, then later relocated to Iowa for his teen years. After graduating from Valley High School (West Des Moines, Iowa) in 1988 he moved to Washington, DC to attend Georgetown University's Walsh School of Foreign Service.
