= Coordinator for Counterterrorism =

United States Department of State official

United States Coordinator for Counterterrorism
- Seal of the United States Department of State

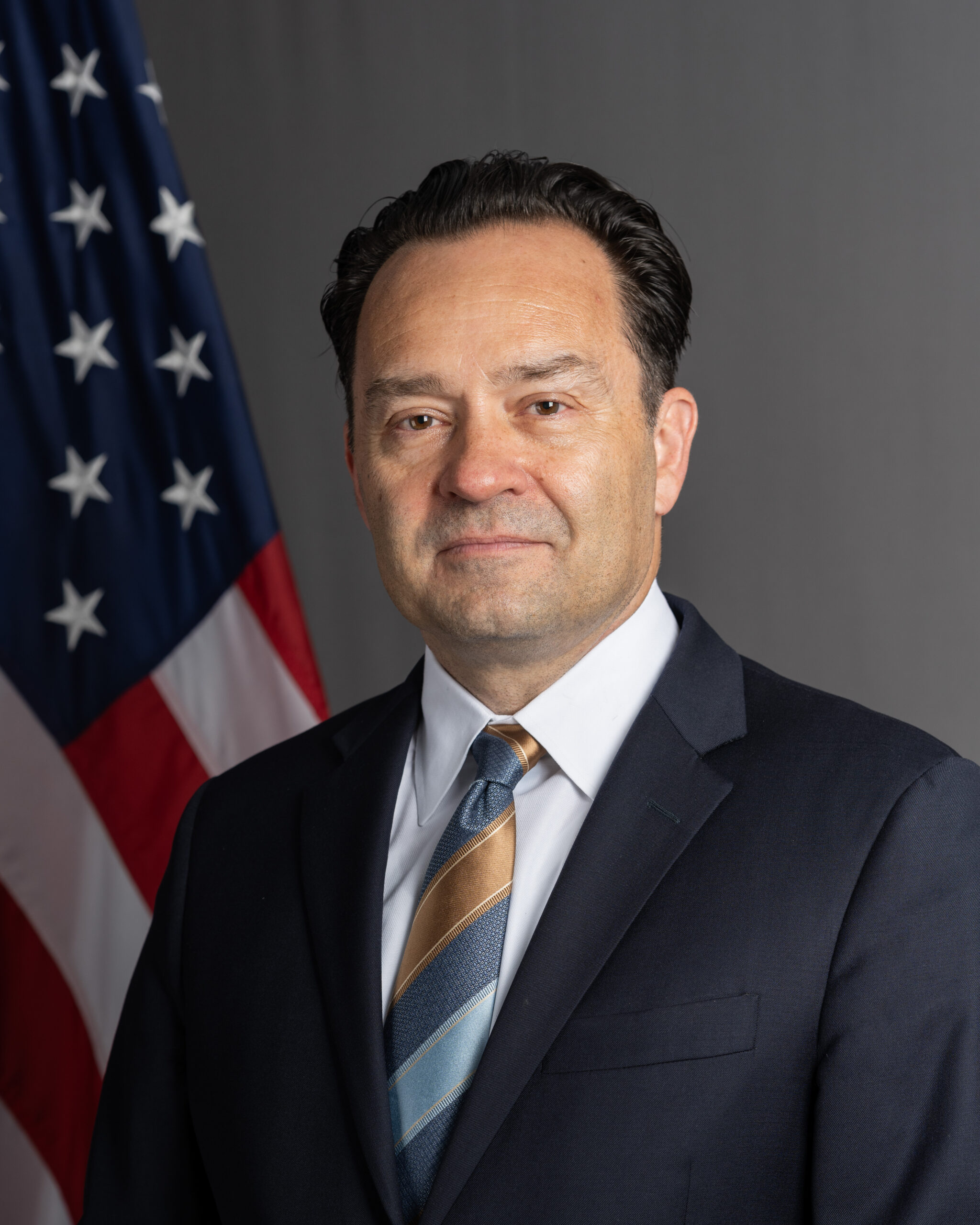
- Incumbent; Gregory LoGerfo since May 21, 2026
- Nominator: President of the United States
- Inaugural holder: L. Douglas Heck
- Formation: 1976
- Website: Official website

The coordinator for counterterrorism heads the Bureau of Counterterrorism and Countering Violent Extremism, which coordinates U.S. government efforts to fight terrorism. As the head of the counterterrorism bureau, the coordinator for counterterrorism has the rank of both ambassador-at-large and assistant secretary.

== List of coordinators ==
The role of coordinator for combating terrorism has often rotated throughout a presidential administration; only presidents Gerald Ford and Donald Trump have maintained a single coordinator throughout their term of office.

#	Image	Name	Assumed office	Left office	President served under
1		L. Douglas Heck	August 29, 1976	June 6, 1977	Gerald Ford
2		Heyward Isham	October 26, 1977	August 1, 1978	Jimmy Carter
3		Anthony C. E. Quainton	August 16, 1978	August 1, 1981	Jimmy Carter
4		Robert M. Sayre	May 11, 1982	September 10, 1984	Ronald Reagan
5		Robert B. Oakley	September 10, 1984	October 12, 1986	Ronald Reagan
6		L. Paul Bremer	October 16, 1986	May 25, 1989	Ronald Reagan
7		Morris D. Busby	May 1, 1989	July 24, 1991	George H. W. Bush
8		Peter Burleigh	November 22, 1991	November 23, 1992	George H. W. Bush
-		Thomas E. McNamara (acting)	November 23, 1992	January 20, 1993	George H. W. Bush
9		Philip C. Wilcox Jr.	March 24, 1995	June 27, 1997	Bill Clinton
10		Christopher W.S. Ross	March 30, 1998	December 13, 1998	Bill Clinton
-		Michael A. Sheehan	December 14, 1998	August 9, 1999 (acting)	Bill Clinton
11		Michael A. Sheehan	August 9, 1999	December 20, 2000	Bill Clinton
12		Francis X. Taylor	July 13, 2001	November 15, 2002	George W. Bush
13		Cofer Black	November 26, 2002	November 15, 2004	George W. Bush
14		Henry A. Crumpton	August 2, 2005	February 2, 2007	George W. Bush
15		Dell L. Dailey	June 22, 2007	April 3, 2009	George W. Bush
16		Daniel Benjamin	May 28, 2009	December 10, 2012	Barack Obama
-		Jerry P. Lanier (acting)	December 10, 2012	February 18, 2014	Barack Obama
17		Tina Kaidanow	February 18, 2014	February 22, 2016	Barack Obama
-		Justin Siberell (acting)	February 22, 2016	January 20, 2017	Barack Obama
18		Nathan A. Sales	August 10, 2017	January 20, 2021	Donald Trump
-		John Godfrey (acting)	January 20, 2021	March 21, 2022	Joe Biden
-		Timothy Alan Betts (acting)	March 21, 2022	January 13, 2023	Joe Biden
-		Christopher A. Landberg (acting)	January 13, 2023	December 29, 2023	Joe Biden
19		Elizabeth H. Richard	December 29, 2023	January 20, 2025	Joe Biden
-		Gregory LoGerfo (acting)	January 20, 2025	October 29, 2025	Donald Trump
-		Monica Ager Jacobsen (acting)	October 30, 2025	May 21, 2026	Donald Trump
20		Gregory LoGerfo	May 21, 2026	Present	Donald Trump
