= Dell L. Dailey =

American general and counterterrorism official

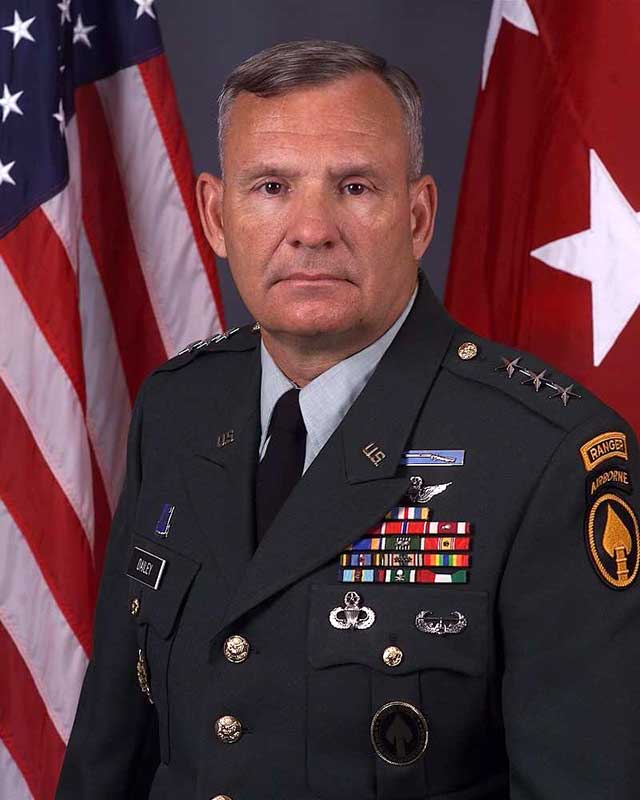

15th Coordinator for Counterterrorism
- In office June 22, 2007 – April 3, 2009
- President: George W. Bush; Barack Obama
- Preceded by: Henry A. Crumpton
- Succeeded by: Daniel Benjamin

Personal details
- Born: 1949 (age 76–77) Flandreau, South Dakota, U.S.
- Education: Shippensburg University (MPA); United States Military Academy (BSc)

Military service
- Allegiance: United States
- Branch/service: United States Army
- Years of service: 1971–2007
- Rank: Lieutenant General
- Commands: Center for Special Operations; Joint Special Operations Command; 160th Special Operations Aviation Regiment (Airborne); 1st Battalion, 160th Special Operations Aviation Regiment (Airborne); 3rd Battalion, 160th Special Operations Aviation Regiment (Airborne)
- Battles/wars: Gulf War; War in Afghanistan; Iraq War
- Awards: Defense Superior Service Medal; Legion of Merit; Bronze Star Medal; Meritorious Service Medal (6); Air Medal

Dell Lee Dailey (born 1949) is a retired United States Army lieutenant general and former head of the State Department's counterterrorism office, serving from July 2007 to April 2009.

== Childhood and education ==
Dailey was born into an Army family in Flandreau, South Dakota. He received a Bachelor of Science degree from the United States Military Academy at West Point in 1971 and earned a master's degree in Public Administration from Shippensburg University in 1994.

== Military career ==
Dailey served over 36 years on active duty in the United States Army, reaching the rank of lieutenant general. He participated in major military operations such as Desert Shield, Desert Storm, Uphold Democracy, Joint Guardian, Enduring Freedom and Iraqi Freedom.

After the September 11, 2001, attacks, Dailey directed the new Center for Special Operations, the military hub for all counterterrorism – United States Special Operations Command, at MacDill Air Force Base, Florida as well as running special operations in Afghanistan and Iraq. From 2001 to 2003, he headed the Joint Special Operations Command, a United States Special Operations Command sub-unit.

== State Department ==
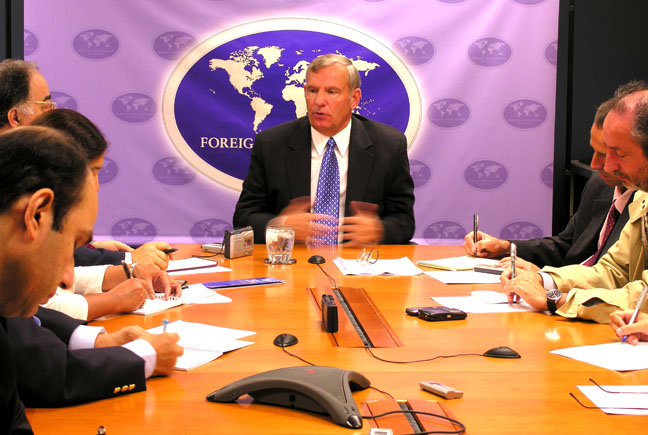
Ambassador at Large Dell L. Dailey in September 2008

Dailey was appointed the Department of State's Coordinator for Counterterrorism on June 22, 2007. In this role he had the title of Ambassador at Large and was charged with coordinating and supporting the development and implementation of U.S. Government policies and programs aimed at countering terrorism overseas. As the principal advisor to the Secretary of State on international counterterrorism matters, he was responsible for taking a leading role in developing coordinated strategies to defeat terrorists abroad and in securing the cooperation of international partners to that end.

== Awards and honors ==
Dailey was inducted into the U.S. Army Ranger Hall of Fame in 2014.

Dailey was inducted into the U.S. Army Aviation Hall of Fame in 2010.

== Commendations ==

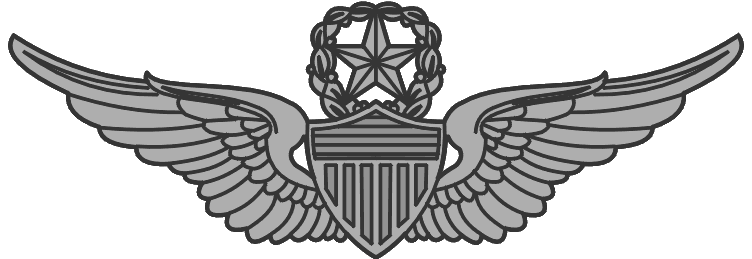

Badge	Expert Infantryman Badge		
Badge	U.S. Army Master Aviator Badge		
1st row	Defense Superior Service Medal		Legion of Merit
2nd row	Bronze Star	Meritorious Service Medal with 1 silver Oak leaf cluster (6 awards)	Air Medal
3rd row	Army Commendation Medal with 2 silver Oak leaf clusters (11 awards)	National Defense Service Medal with 1 Service star	Armed Forces Expeditionary Medal with 1 bronze Campaign star
4th row	Southwest Asia Service Medal with 4 bronze Campaign stars	Afghanistan Campaign Medal with 1 bronze Campaign star	Iraq Campaign Medal with 2 bronze Campaign stars
5th row	Global War on Terrorism Expeditionary Medal	Global War on Terrorism Service Medal	Army Service Ribbon
6th row	Army Overseas Service Ribbon with award numeral 3	Kuwait Liberation Medal (Saudi Arabia)	Kuwait Liberation Medal (Kuwait)
Badges	Ranger Tab	Master Parachutist Badge	Air Assault Badge

Other accoutrements
Combat Action Badge
160th SOAR (A); Distinctive unit insignia
USASOAC; Combat Service Identification Badge
USSOCOM; Shoulder sleeve insignia
USSOCOM; Emblem Badge
United States Army Staff Identification Badge
