= Tunisia–United States relations =

- Tunisia: United States

Diplomatic mission
- Embassy of Tunisia in Washington, D.C.: Embassy of the United States in Tunis

Envoy
- Ambassador Hanene Tajouri Bessassi: Ambassador Bill Bazzi

Tunisia–United States relations are bilateral relations between Tunisia and the United States.

According to a 2012 global opinion poll carried out by the Pew Research Center, 45% of Tunisians view the U.S. favorably, with the percentage going up to 53% for 18-to-29-year-olds.

== History ==
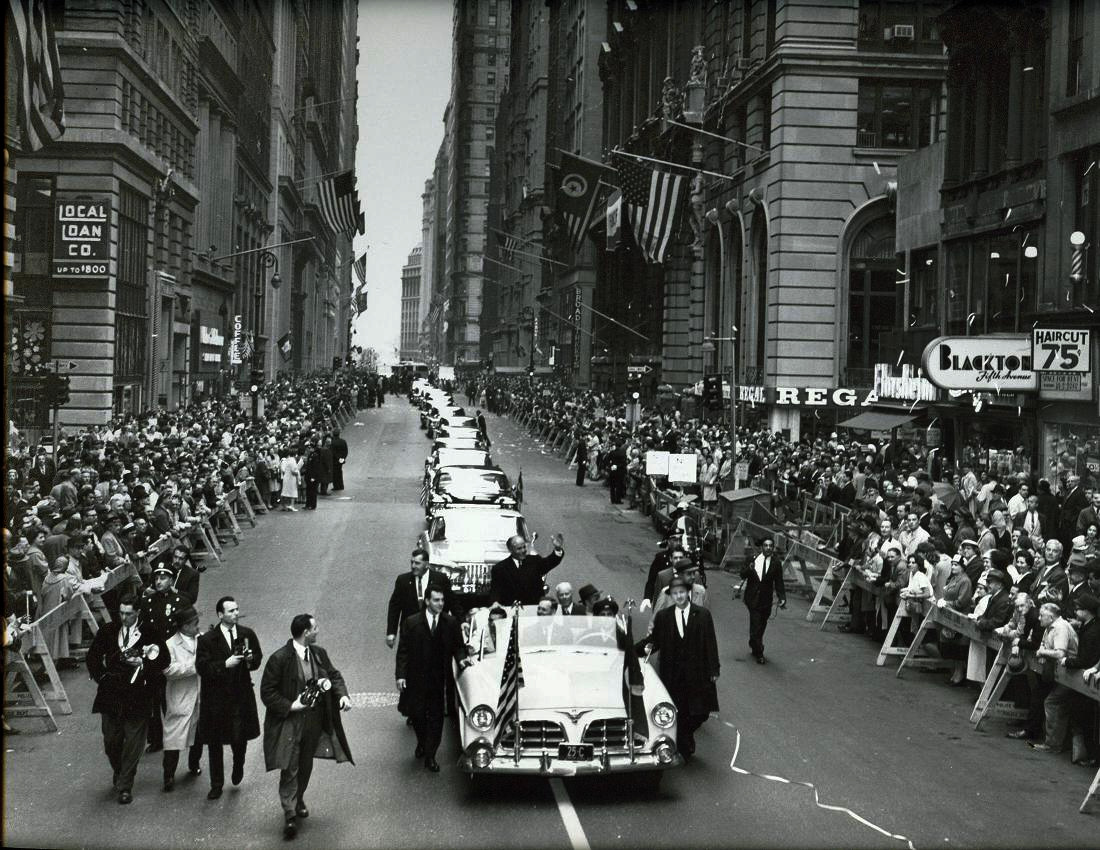
Reception of President Habib Bourguiba in the streets of New York in 1961.

The United States has very good relations with Tunisia, which date back to more than 200 years. The United States has maintained official representation in Tunis almost continuously since 1795, and the American Friendship Treaty with Tunisia was signed in 1797. The two governments are not linked by security treaties, but relations have been close since Tunisia's independence. U.S.-Tunisian relations suffered in 1985, after Israel bombed the PLO headquarters in Tunis. Believing the U.S. knew about the attack, and was possibly involved, Tunisia considered suspending diplomatic ties with the U.S. but did not do so, after the U.S. explicitly dissociated itself from the actions of Israel. Relations also suffered as a result of the 1988 Tunis assassination of PLO nationalist Abu Jihad, and the Gulf War in 1990. A 2024 Pew Research poll showed that 93 percent of Tunisians are dissatisfied with the way U.S. President Joe Biden was handling Israel's war in Gaza.

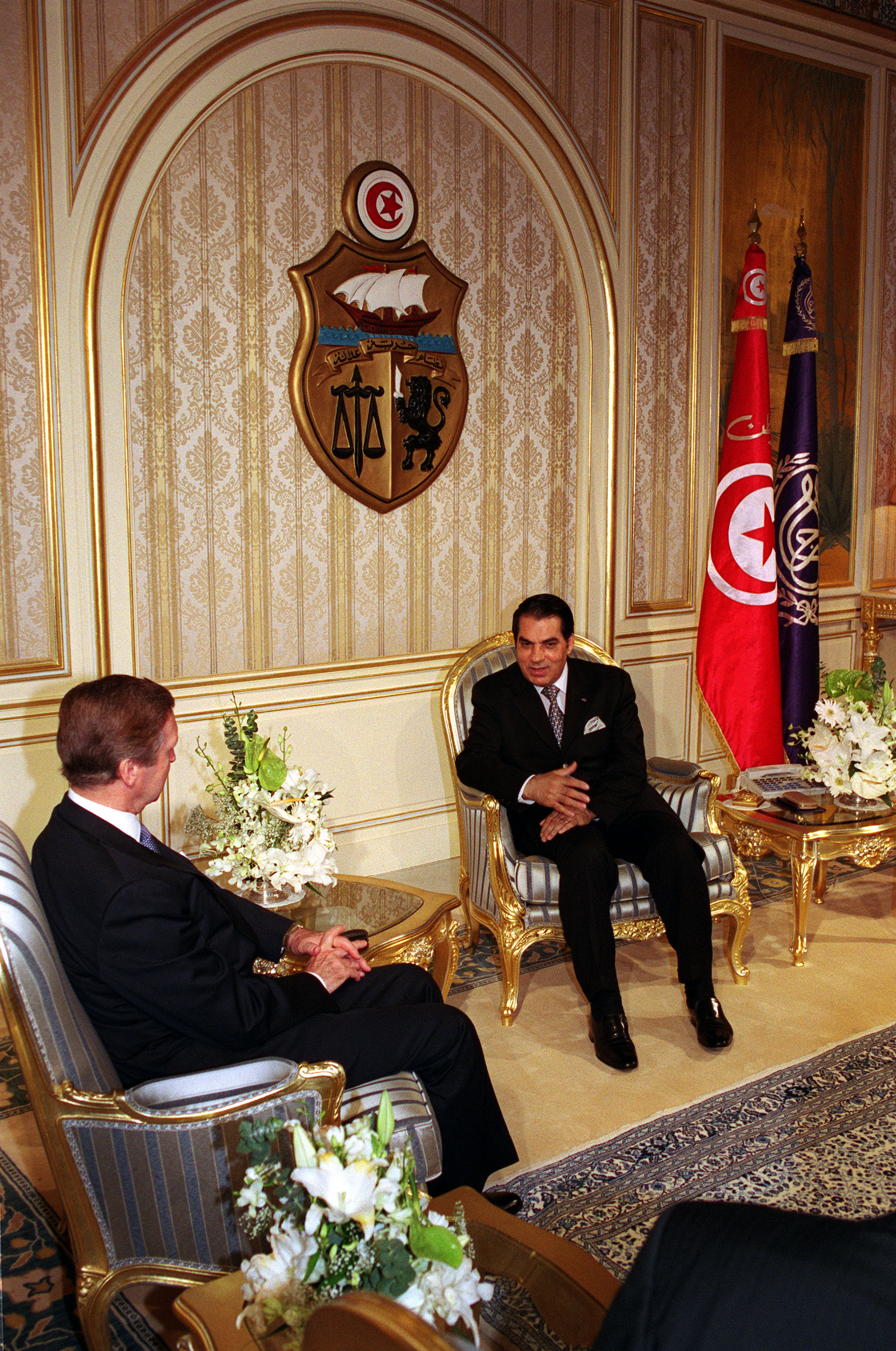
William Cohen meets with Zine El Abidine Ben Ali at the Presidential Palace in Tunis, on Oct. 7, 2000.

Relations later warmed, reflecting strong bilateral ties. The United States and Tunisia have an active schedule of joint military exercises. U.S. security assistance historically has played an important role in cementing relations. The U.S.-Tunisian Joint Military Commission meets annually to discuss military cooperation, Tunisia's defense modernization program, and other security matters.

The United States first provided economic and technical assistance to Tunisia under a bilateral agreement signed March 26, 1957. The United States Agency for International Development (USAID) managed a program until its departure in 1994, when Tunisia's economic advances led to the country's "graduation" from USAID funding. Tunisia enthusiastically supported the U.S.-North African Economic Partnership (USNAEP), designed to promote U.S. investment in, and economic integration of, the Maghreb region. The program provided over $4 million in assistance to Tunisia between 2001 and 2003. The Middle East Partnership Initiative (MEPI) was launched in 2002 and incorporated the former USNAEP economic reform projects while adding bilateral and regional projects for education reform, civil society development and women's empowerment. In 2004, the MEPI Regional Office opened in Embassy Tunis. The Regional Office is staffed by American diplomats and regional specialists. It is responsible for coordinating MEPI activities in Algeria, Egypt, Lebanon, Morocco and Tunisia in close coordination with the American Embassies in those countries.

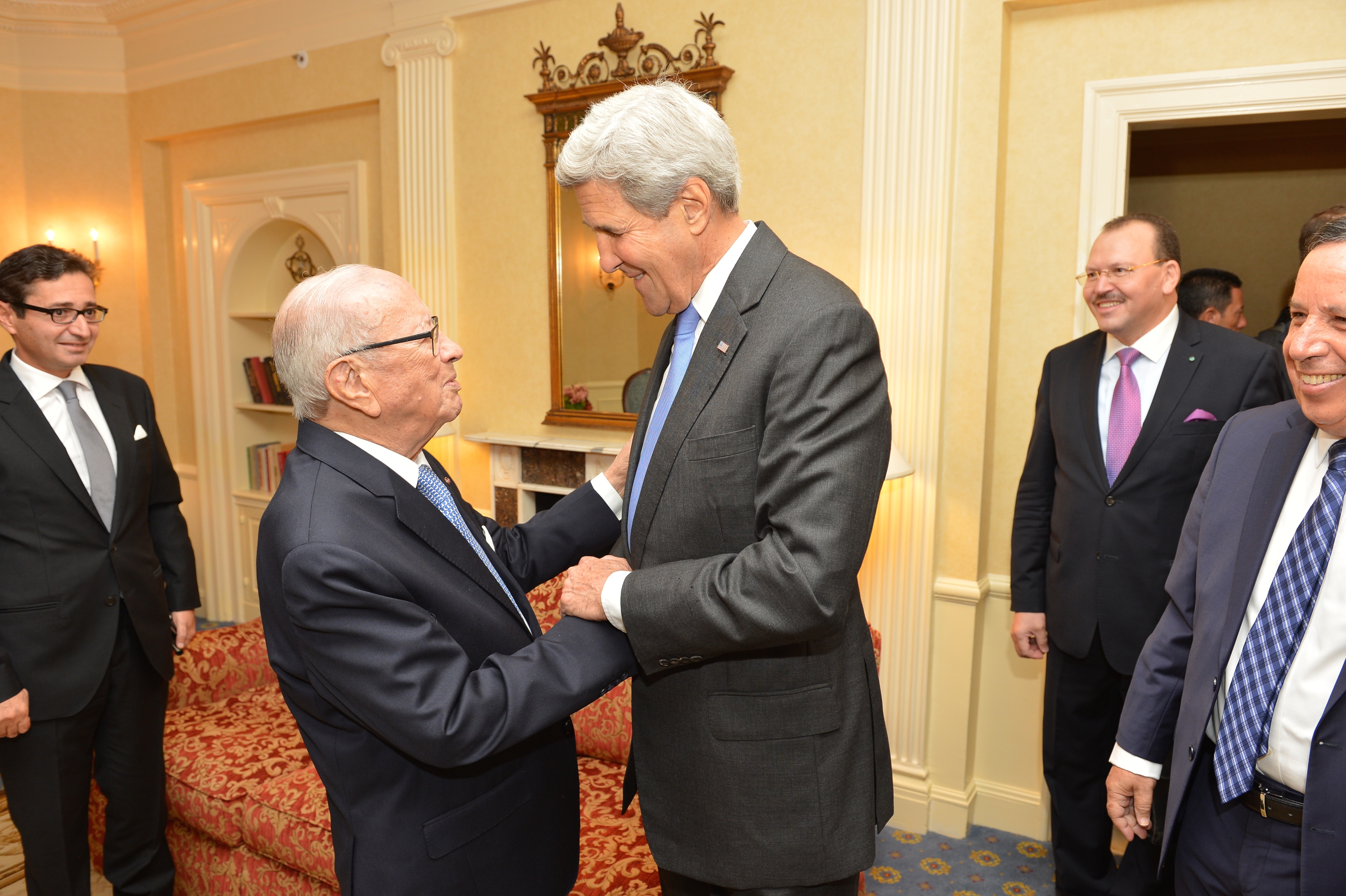
Beji Caid Essebsi with U.S. Secretary of State John Kerry (19 September 2016 in New York City)

American private assistance has been provided since independence by foundations, religious groups, universities, and philanthropic organizations. The U.S. Government has supported Tunisia's efforts to attract foreign investment. The United States and Tunisia concluded a bilateral investment treaty in 1990 and an agreement to avoid double taxation in 1989. In October 2002, the U.S. and Tunisia signed a Trade and Investment Framework Agreement (TIFA), and in October 2003 held the first TIFA Council Meeting in Washington, DC.

American firms seeking to invest in Tunisia and export to Tunisia can receive insurance and financing for their business through U.S. Government agencies, including the Overseas Private Investment Corporation and the Export-Import Bank. The best prospects for foreigners interested in the Tunisian market are in high technology, energy, agribusiness, food processing, medical care and equipment, and the environmental and tourism sectors.

== Resident diplomatic missions ==
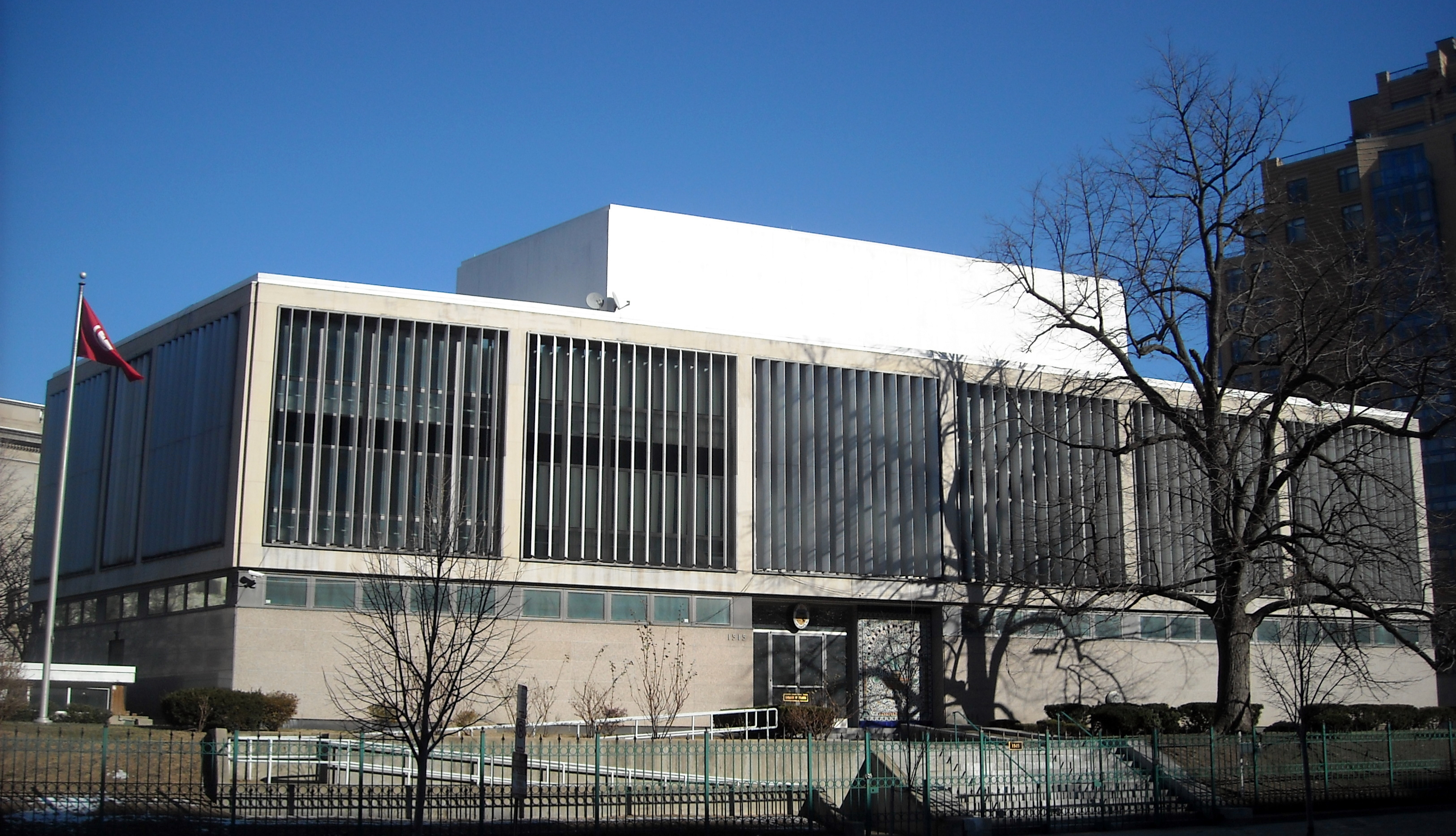
Embassy of Tunisia, Washington, D.C.

Tunisia maintains an embassy in Washington, D.C.

The U.S. maintains an embassy in Tunis. As of January 2026, the principal U.S. Officials included: the Ambassador Bill Bazzi, Deputy Chief of Mission Emily Katkar, and Consular Section Chief David Smith.

== See also ==
- Foreign relations of Tunisia
- Foreign relations of the United States
- Treaty with Tunis (1797)
- Embassy of Tunisia, Washington, D.C.
- Embassy of the United States, Tunis
