= Tammy Bruce =

American broadcaster and political activist (born 1962)

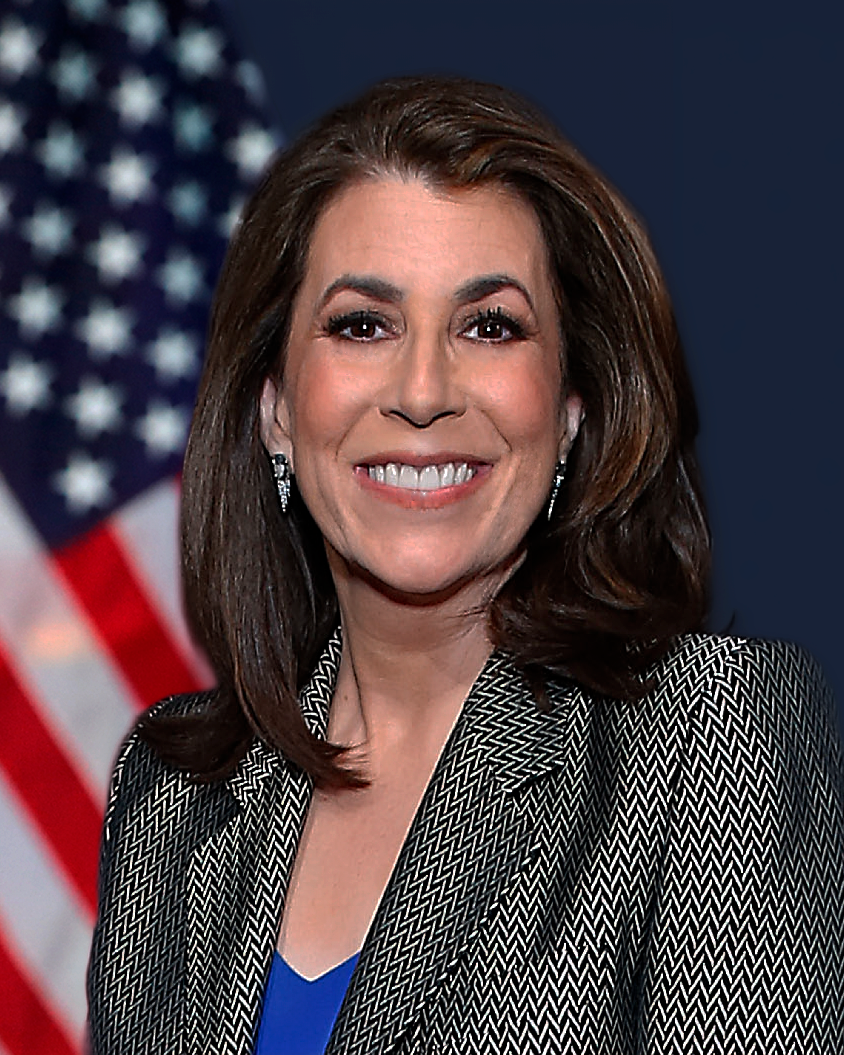
- Official portrait, 2026

United States Deputy Ambassador to the United Nations
- Incumbent
- Assumed office December 29, 2025
- President: Donald Trump
- Preceded by: Dorothy Shea

31st Spokeswoman for the United States Department of State
- In office January 20, 2025 – August 12, 2025
- President: Donald Trump
- Deputy: Tommy Pigott
- Preceded by: Matthew Miller
- Succeeded by: Tommy Pigott

Personal details
- Born: Tammy K. Bruce; August 20, 1962 (age 64) Los Angeles, California, U.S.
- Party: Republican
- Domestic partner: Brenda Benet (1980–1982)
- Education: University of Southern California (BA)
- Website: tammybruce.com

Tammy K. Bruce (born August 20, 1962) is an American conservative radio host, author, and political commentator. She has served as United States Deputy Ambassador to the United Nations since December 2025. She previously served as spokeswoman for the United States Department of State from January to August 2025 in the second Trump administration. Bruce has been an on-air contributor to Fox News and has also hosted Get Tammy Bruce on Fox Nation.

== Early life and education ==
Tammy Bruce was born on August 20, 1962, in Northridge, California. Her mother was a retail store clerk. Bruce has never met her biological father, saying that he "disappeared a few months before I was born".

Bruce went to Ventura High School, where she lasted only two weeks. She subsequently took the California Proficiency Exam and passed. Bruce returned to school in her late 30s and obtained a bachelor's degree in political science from the University of Southern California in 2002.

== Career ==
=== Early work (late 1970s–1980s) ===
After leaving her formal education at 15, Bruce moved to Illinois and began a series of minor jobs. She moved back to Los Angeles and worked as a personal secretary for Brenda Benet until 1982. She later worked for Gloria Loring and her then-husband, Alan Thicke.

Bruce also worked in electronic publicity, creating video news releases and press kits to distribute to news organizations.

=== Feminism (1990–2000s) ===
For seven years, Bruce served as president of the Los Angeles chapter of the National Organization for Women (NOW) (1990–1996). She was the youngest woman at the time to lead a major chapter of NOW.

In 1995, responding to the verdict in the O. J. Simpson murder trial, Bruce said "What we need to teach our children is...not about racism, but is about violence against women″ and that her message to Simpson was "You are not welcome here, you are not welcome in this country, you are not welcome on our airwaves, you are not welcome in our culture." She also refused to discuss the issue on a talk show, reportedly saying "I don’t have time to argue with a bunch of black women; we’ve moved beyond that." The NOW Executive Board voted to censure her for what it called "racially insensitive comments". Bruce claimed that the censure was due to her focus on domestic violence, as opposed to defense attorney Johnnie Cochran's "racial issues" trial argument. She resigned from NOW five months later, in May 1996. Since then, Bruce has written about what she sees as the failings of NOW and the political left in general. She has said that the feminist establishment in the U.S. has abandoned authentic feminism. She launched a new organization, the Women’s Progress Alliance with Denise Brown, the sister of Nicole Brown Simpson, saying “We both have been controversial, and we both will remain controversial."

In 1997, Bruce hosted an overnight weekend talk show on KFI, in Los Angeles. She also hosted a national radio program on Talk Radio Network throughout much of the 2000s.

In 2003, Bruce was appointed to serve on California Governor-elect Arnold Schwarzenegger's transition team following his successful recall election against Governor Gray Davis.

=== Political commentator (2010–2024) ===
Bruce had been a Democrat and a liberal activist, but later became a conservative. In a 2010 op-ed, she wrote the following: "The real story of bigotry and intolerance is the fact that it lives and thrives on the left. As a gay woman who spent most of her adult life pushing the cart for liberal causes with liberal friends in a liberal city, I found that sexism, racism and homophobia are staples in the liberal world. The huge irony is liberals spend every ounce of energy promoting the notion that they are the banner carriers of individualism and personal freedom, yet the hammer comes down on anyone who dares not to conform to, or who dissents even in part from, the liberal agenda".

Bruce returned to Talk Radio Network in November 2012 as a guest host during the move of The Laura Ingraham Show from TRN to Courtside Entertainment Group.. In 2014, Bruce created a short video for the conservative YouTube channel Prager University in which she summarized her criticisms of the contemporary feminist movement.

Bruce was the subject of controversy in May 2017, when appearing as a guest on Fox News show Tucker Carlson Tonight. She criticized an autistic child for asking Vice President Mike Pence for an apology when he accidentally brushed the young boy in the face. She later apologized on air.

In December 2018, Bruce appeared on Fox News to criticize the decision of one Scottish coffee shop to call "gingerbread men" "gingerbread people". Bruce said, "obviously, they're men". She characterized the decision by the coffee shop as "the tipping point" in policing free speech.

Bruce was a Fox News contributor. In 2019, she became the host of Get Tammy Bruce, which airs on the Fox Nation streaming service.

=== Second Trump administration (2025–present) ===
In January 2025, Donald Trump announced that Bruce would be named as spokeswoman for the United States Department of State in his second administration. In August 2025, he nominated her to be Deputy Ambassador to the United Nations. She was sworn in on December 29, 2025. During an emergency session of the UN Security Council, called by Somalia in regard to Israel’s recognition of Somaliland, Bruce was quoted saying "Earlier this year, several countries, including members of this Council, made the unilateral decision to recognize a nonexistent Palestinian state. And yet, no emergency meeting was called to express this Council's outrage,".

==== Spokeswoman the United States Department of State ====
Tammy Bruce served as Spokesperson for the United States Department of State in 2025 during the second administration of Donald Trump. She acted as the department’s main public voice, holding regular press briefings and issuing official statements on U.S. foreign policy.

In August 2025, she was nominated to become U.S. Deputy Representative to the United Nations, after which her spokesperson duties were gradually taken over by Principal Deputy Spokesperson Tommy Pigott.

==== Deputy Ambassador to the United Nations ====
Tammy Bruce assumed office as Deputy Permanent Representative of the United States to the United Nations on 29 December 2025. She was previously the Spokesperson for the United States Department of State earlier in 2025.

As Deputy Permanent Representative, she serves as the second-ranking official in the U.S. Mission to the United Nations in New York, supporting the Permanent Representative in representing the United States at meetings of the UN Security Council, General Assembly, and other UN bodies, and helping coordinate U.S. diplomatic policy at the United Nations.

== Personal life ==
At the age of 17, Bruce commenced a romantic partnership with 34-year-old actress Brenda Benet. At the time, Bruce was employed as Benet's personal secretary. Later, Bruce and Benet lived together for nearly a year before Bruce moved out of their shared residence. After her son’s death, Benet became severely depressed. On April 7, 1982, Benet died of a self-inflicted gunshot at her home before she was scheduled to have lunch with Bruce.

In a 2005 interview with C-SPAN, Bruce identified herself as a pro-choice lesbian.

== Books ==
- — (28 January 2003). The New Thought Police: Inside the Left's Assault on Free Speech and Free Minds. Crown Forum. ISBN 978-0761563730. LCCN 2002153782. OCLC 46640997. OL 8018751M – via Internet Archive.
- — (22 April 2003). The Death of Right and Wrong: Exposing the Left's Assault on Our Culture and Values. Random House. ISBN 978-0761516637. OCLC 51293804. OL 8017248M – via Internet Archive.
- — (1 November 2005). The New American Revolution: Using the Power of the Individual to Save Our Nation from Extremists. William Morrow and Company. ISBN 978-0060726201. LCCN 2005044390. OCLC 61123134. OL 3422638M – via Internet Archive.
- — (2024). Fear Itself: Exposing the Left's Mind-Killing Agenda. Broadside Books. ISBN 9780063228528. LCCN 2024001365.

== Films ==
Bruce made her film debut in the 2009 short feature film 2081, based on the Kurt Vonnegut short story, Harrison Bergeron. She also appeared in the 2011 documentary The Undefeated.
