= Embassy of the United States, Tunis =

- Location: Tunis, Tunisia
- Address: 1053 Les Berges Du Lac Walkway, Tunis, Tunisia
- Coordinates: 36°51′0″N 10°16′8″E
- Website: https://tn.usembassy.gov

The Embassy of the United States in Tunis is the diplomatic mission of the United States of America in Tunisia.

== History ==
On March 22, 1956, the United States recognized Tunisia's independence from France in a congratulatory message by U.S. Consul General Morris N. Hughes to Sidi Mohammed Lamine Pasha, Bey of Tunis. The status of the Consulate General in Tunis was raised to an embassy on June 5, 1956, with official recognition the next day. Throughout the 20th century USAID's provided over $1.4 billion in assistance for various developmental projects. In 1961, Tunisia was the first Arab country to request and receive Peace Corps volunteers, marking over three decades of American participation in Tunisia's social and economic development.

In November 2002, a new embassy was established in Berges du Lac. In September 2012, following the Benghazi attack, two people were killed as a crowd breached the embassy border and set fire to trees and an American school. In March 2020, two suicide bombers killed a policeman and injured six other people.

== See also ==
- Embassy of Tunisia, Washington, D.C.
- List of ambassadors of the United States to Tunisia
- Tunisia–United States relations
