= Daniel Benjamin =

American diplomat and journalist

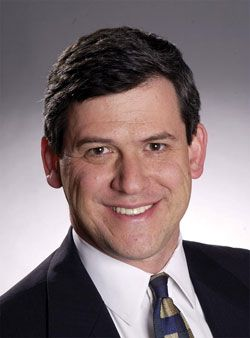

16th Coordinator for Counterterrorism
- In office May 28, 2009 – December 10, 2012
- President: Barack Obama
- Preceded by: Dell Dailey
- Succeeded by: Tina S. Kaidanow

Personal details
- Born: October 16, 1961 (age 64)
- Education: Harvard University; New College, Oxford
- Occupation: Diplomat, journalist

Daniel Benjamin (born October 16, 1961) is an American diplomat and journalist and was the Coordinator for Counterterrorism at the United States Department of State from 2009 to 2012, appointed by Secretary Hillary Clinton. Benjamin was the director of the John Sloan Dickey Center for International Understanding at Dartmouth College. In July 2020, he became president of the American Academy in Berlin, a nonprofit, nonpartisan, independent transatlantic institution in the German capital.

== Early life ==
Benjamin grew up in Stamford, Conn., one of three sons (William Benjamin and Jonathan Benjamin) born to Burton and Susan Benjamin. His father is an internist; his late mother was a teacher, an administrator at the University of Connecticut and the head of marketing for a Manhattan law firm. They were a moderately observant Jewish family. Benjamin graduated from Harvard University magna cum laude, and then was a 1983 Marshall Scholar at New College, Oxford. After college, he worked as a journalist for Time and The Wall Street Journal.

== Government service ==
From 1994 to 1999, as a member of President Clinton's staff, Benjamin served as a foreign policy speech writer and special assistant. During that period, he also served on the National Security Council.

From 2009 to 2012, Benjamin was the US State Department's Coordinator for counter-terrorism, with the rank of Ambassador-at-Large.

== Academic work ==
Benjamin was a Senior Fellow in the International Security Program at the Center for Strategic and International Studies. He was also named a 2004 Berlin prize fellow by the American Academy in Berlin.

From December 2006 to May 2009, Benjamin served as the Director for the Center on the United States and Europe, and Senior Fellow of Foreign Policy Studies at The Brookings Institution.

In 2012, he was appointed the Norman E. McCulloch Jr. Director of the John Sloan Dickey Center for International Understanding at Dartmouth College.

== Writing ==
Together with Steven Simon, Benjamin wrote The Age of Sacred Terror (Random House, 2002), which documents the rise of al Qaeda and religiously motivated terrorism, as well as America's efforts to combat that threat. They review the history of Islamist political thought from ibn Taymiyya in the 13th century, to al-Wahhab (the 18th century founder of Wahabbism) down to bin Laden. The danger, as they see it, is that "al Qaeda's belief system cannot be separated neatly from Islamic teachings, because it has -- selectively and perniciously -- built on fundamental Islamic ideas and principles." The second half of the book outlines the West's response. Ellen Laipson, in her review of the book, praises the authors for their study and methodology.

Benjamin and Simon would follow up The Age of Sacred Terror in 2005 with The Next Attack: The Globalization of Jihad (Hodder & Soughton (in Britain), 2005), a book which received high-praise from Bill Clinton.

In the April 30, 2006 edition of Time, Benjamin wrote a favorable profile of Pervez Musharraf, with the headline, "Why Pakistan's Leader May Be The West's Best Bet for Peace."
