= Gary Schroen =

American intelligence officer (1941–2022)

- Schroen c. 2005
- Born: Gary Charles Schroen; November 6, 1941; East St. Louis, Illinois, U.S.
- Died: August 1, 2022 (aged 80); Alexandria, Virginia, U.S.
- Burial place: Grace Episcopal Church; Alexandria, Virginia, U.S.
- Education: Southern Illinois University Edwardsville
- Spouses: Patricia Healey; Bette Neil; Anne McFadden (m. 2009)
- Children: 3 (1 deceased)
- Espionage activity
- Allegiance: United States
- Agency: CIA
- Service years: 1969–2001
- Operations: Operation Cyclone; United States invasion of Afghanistan

Gary Charles Schroen (November 6, 1941 – August 1, 2022) was an American intelligence officer who spent 32 years with the Central Intelligence Agency, most notably as a field officer in charge of the initial CIA incursion into Afghanistan in September 2001 to topple the Taliban and destroy Al-Qaeda. He retired as the most decorated CIA officer in history.

== Early life ==
Schroen was born November 6, 1941, in East St. Louis, Illinois, to Emil and Fern (née Finch) Schroen. His father was a union electrician, and his mother a homemaker. He joined the Army after graduating from high school in 1959, serving in the Army Security Agency in West Germany for three years. In an incident Schroen called "a bad start" in an unpublished short story, a beer bottle he had left on top of his barracks mailbox spilled on outgoing Christmas correspondence, enraging his commanding officer who threatened to court-martial him for tampering with the U.S. mail. He was reduced in rank to a private instead.

After receiving an honorable discharge in 1962, Schroen attended Southern Illinois University Edwardsville, working as a janitor and unloading trucks for UPS during college, and graduating with a degree in English in 1968. After graduation he began teaching 5th grade in the Detroit Public Schools.

In June 1969, Schroen joined the CIA.

== Career ==
Schroen worked in the Directorate of Operations for 32 years, rising from a case officer to deputy chief of the Near East Division in 1999, a post he held through 2001. He spoke fluent Persian and its Afghan Dialect of Dari and became the agency's top expert on Afghanistan.

Schroen spent much of the 1970s in Iran. As Schroen walked home from the U.S. Embassy in Tehran one night in September 1975, "two Iranian men in suits" attempted to assassinate him in the street, an incident he escaped by pulling a gun on the would-be killers and sprinting away.

On November 21, 1979, Pakistani student protesters who were erroneously led to believe that the U.S. was responsible for the Grand Mosque seizure in Mecca, stormed and set fire to the U.S. Embassy in Islamabad, trapping Schroen and others inside. They ultimately found refuge in a code room vault and escaped the compound unharmed before protesters burnt it to the ground. Following his death, widow Anne McFadden would recount to The Washington Post that Schroen often said "If there aren't 3,000 students coming over the fence, then it's not an emergency."

Later in his career, Schroen served in numerous posts, including chief of station in Kabul, Afghanistan (but based out of Pakistan) in the late 1980s. From 1992 to 1994, he worked at CIA headquarters in Langley, Virginia, controlling counter-Iran operations. He later served as chief of station in Islamabad, Pakistan from 1996 until mid-1999. During this period, he directed CIA operations to find and capture Osama bin Laden, and began renewing relationships with the Mujahideen commanders who fought the Soviets in the Soviet–Afghan War, including Northern Alliance commander General Ahmad Shah Massoud. He also helped lead a 1997 operation in conjunction with the FBI that captured Mir Aimal Kansi, an FBI Ten Most Wanted Fugitive responsible for the 1993 CIA headquarters shooting.

Although he planned to retire, Schroen was recalled after the September 11 attacks to lead a CIA team into Afghanistan. He was asked by Coordinator for Counterterrorism, Cofer Black, to lead a team into the country to kill Bin Laden and top al-Qaeda leaders. Black had told him that he wanted to see "photos of their heads on pikes." The seven-officer Northern Alliance Liaison Team (NALT), code named Jawbreaker, landed in Panjshir Valley on September 26 as the first Americans on the ground and began securing support among the Northern Alliance, days before the arrival of ODA 555 and ODA 595, each a 12-man A-team from the 5th Special Forces Group as well as a small number of men from Delta Force. He later wrote the book First In: How Seven CIA Officers Opened the War on Terror in Afghanistan (2005) recounting his Afghan experiences. The CIA's review of the book in Studies in Intelligence called it a "mostly straightforward account" of his role which "does a good job getting much of the story out to the American public."

Schroen retired in November 2001 as the most decorated CIA officer in history to date. Following his retirement, he returned to the agency as a contractor. By 2007, he was teaching tradecraft to new officers.

== Personal life and death ==
After two prior marriages to Patricia Ann Healey and Bette Jean Neil ended in divorce, Schroen married Anne McFadden, a fellow CIA officer who spent 35 years with the agency working on Iran, counterproliferation, and counterintelligence, in November 2009. He had three children, two daughters, and a son, Christopher, a Navy linguist and Gulf War veteran who died of cancer in 2017. He also had four stepdaughters, and two granddaughters.

While Al-Shabaab once claimed via Twitter to have killed Schroen in a July 2013 attack, Schroen died at his home in Alexandria, Virginia, on August 1, 2022, at the age of 80, following either a stroke or complications from a fall. Schroen was interred at the columbarium of Grace Episcopal Church in Alexandria, Virginia on September 24, 2022. At the time of his death, CIA director William J. Burns hailed him as a "legend and inspiration to every Agency officer." His death occurred the day after a U.S. drone strike killed Osama bin Laden's successor, Ayman al-Zawahiri, who as Bin Laden's deputy had been one of Schroen's targets.

Schroen was a noted fan of the Comic Sans font.

== In popular culture ==
Schroen's experiences in Afghanistan prior to September 11 were chronicled in Steve Coll's 2004 Pulitzer Prize-winning book, Ghost Wars.

Schroen was also one of several inspirations for the 2006 two-part miniseries The Path to 9/11 character CIA Operative "Kirk", who writers said was a compilation based on several actual people.

== See also ==
- Gary Berntsen
- Cofer Black
- Operation Cyclone
- Charlie Wilson's War: The Extraordinary Story of the Largest Covert Operation in History
- Charlie Wilson's War (2007 film)
