= National Resources Division =

Domestic division of the American Central Intelligence Agency (CIA)

The Seal of the Central Intelligence Agency

The National Resources Division (NR) is the domestic division of the United States Central Intelligence Agency. Its main function is to conduct voluntary debriefings of U.S. citizens who travel overseas for work or to visit relatives, and to recruit foreign students, diplomats, and business people to become CIA assets when they return to their countries.

== History ==
The division was formed in 1991 by the merger of the CIA's Foreign Resources Division and the National Collection Division.

The Domestic Resources Division was created in 1963 as the Domestic Operations Division and given the responsibility for clandestine operational activities of the Clandestine Services conducted within the United States against foreign targets. Its eventual function was to locate foreign nationals of special interest who resided in the United States and recruit them to serve as CIA assets when they returned home (or to some other foreign location).

The National Collection Division collected intelligence from U.S. residents who had traveled abroad, including scientists, technologists, economists, and energy experts returning from foreign locations.
