= Nathan Sales =

American attorney & diplomat

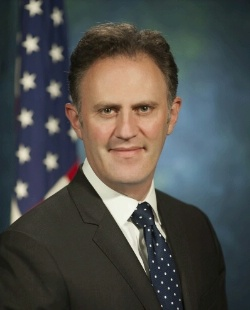

Special Presidential Envoy for the Global Coalition to Counter the Islamic State of Iraq and the Levant
- In office November 9, 2020 – January 20, 2021
- President: Donald Trump
- Preceded by: Jim Jeffrey
- Succeeded by: vacant

18th Coordinator for Counterterrorism
- In office August 10, 2017 – January 20, 2021
- President: Donald Trump
- Preceded by: Tina Kaidanow
- Succeeded by: Elizabeth H. Richard

Acting Under Secretary of State for Civilian Security, Democracy, and Human Rights
- In office September 29, 2017 – December 21, 2020
- President: Donald Trump
- Preceded by: Sarah Sewall
- Succeeded by: Eric Ueland (Acting)

Personal details
- Born: Nathan Alexander Sales Canton, Ohio, U.S.
- Spouse: Margaret Tretter
- Children: 2
- Education: Miami University (BA); Duke University (JD)
- Awards: Attorney General's Award for Exceptional Service; Attorney General's Distinguished Service Award

Nathan Alexander Sales is an American lawyer, academic, and government official who served as the coordinator for counterterrorism and special envoy to the Global Coalition to Defeat ISIS within the U.S. Department of State from 2017 to 2021. Prior to public service he was an associate professor at Syracuse University College of Law, where his fields of research included national security law, counterterrorism law, administrative law, and constitutional law. Sales was also of counsel at the law firm Kirkland & Ellis.

Sales was also delegated the duties of under secretary of state for civilian security, democracy, and human rights between September 2017 and December 2020.

== Early life and education ==
Sales was born in Canton, Ohio. He earned a Bachelor of Arts degree, summa cum laude, from Miami University and his Juris Doctor, magna cum laude, from the Duke University School of Law. In law school, he was research editor of the Duke Law Journal. Sales was a member of Phi Beta Kappa and the Order of the Coif. He clerked for Judge David B. Sentelle of the United States Court of Appeals for the District of Columbia Circuit.

== Career ==
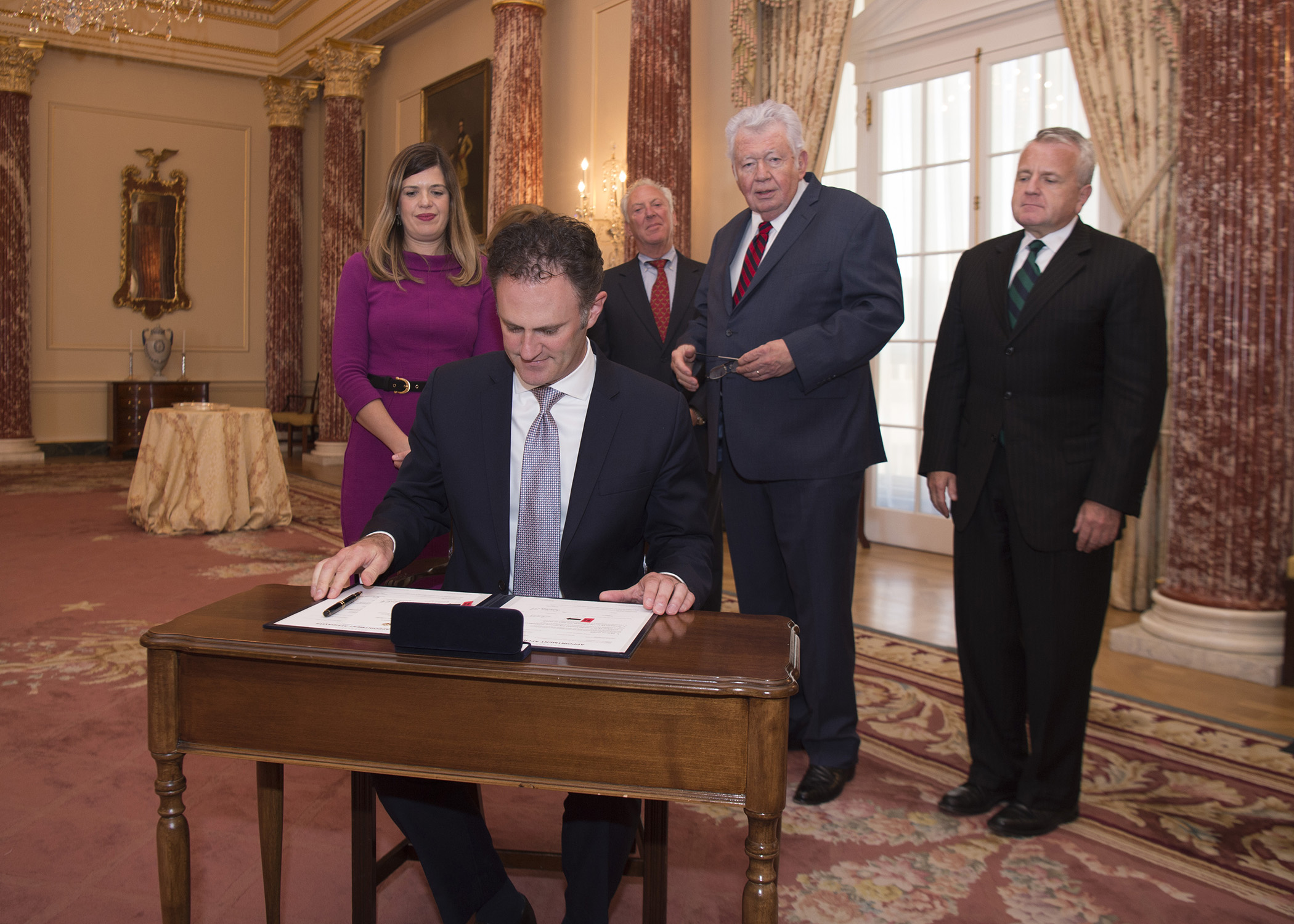
Sales prepares to sign his appointment papers to assume office on September 29, 2017.

Sales previously served as deputy assistant secretary for policy at the United States Department of Homeland Security and senior counsel in the Office of Legal Policy. In June 2017, President Donald Trump nominated Sales to serve as Coordinator for Counterterrorism. He was confirmed to this position by the United States Senate on August 3, 2017. In September 2017, he was further delegated the duties of under secretary of state for civilian security, democracy, and human rights by Secretary of State Mike Pompeo. He held this position until December 2020. Additionally, he was appointed special envoy to the Global Coalition to Defeat ISIS in November 2020.

Sales is a nonresident senior fellow at the Atlantic Council involved with its Scowcroft Middle East Security Initiative and Middle East Programs, as well as a senior fellow at The Soufan Center involved with global security issues and geopolitical dynamics including matters concerning terrorism, China, Russia, and Ukraine.

== Personal life ==
Sales is married to Margaret Tretter and has two children.

Government offices
Preceded by Tina Kaidanow	Coordinator for Counterterrorism; 2017–2021	Succeeded by John T. Godfrey; Acting
